= Adam Faith discography =

- Studio albums: 7
- EPs: 16
- Soundtrack albums: 1
- Live albums: 1
- Compilation albums: 20
- Singles: 42
- Cast recording albums: 2

The discography of English singer Adam Faith consists of seven studio albums, one live album, 20 compilation albums, 16 extended plays, and 42 singles. Faith also performed songs on the soundtrack for the film Beat Girl, and the cast recordings for the musical Fings Ain't Wot They Used T'Be and the television series Budgie, all in which Faith also starred. Faith achieved notable success in the UK, starting in 1959 with his first number-one single "What Do You Want?", before having a further ten top-singles during the 1960s. After the mid-1960s, his success waned, though he achieved his final charting single in 1994 with a cover of Stealers Wheel's "Stuck in the Middle with You".

== Albums ==
=== Studio albums ===
Title	Details	Peak chart positions
Title	Details	UK
Adam	Released: 4 November 1960; Label: Parlophone	5
Adam Faith	Released: November 1961; Label: Parlophone	20
From Adam with Love	Released: November 1962; Label: Parlophone	—
For You	Released: November 1963; Label: Parlophone	—
On the Move	Released: September 1964; Label: Parlophone; With the Roulettes	—
I Survive	Released: 2 September 1974; Label: Warner Bros.	—
Midnight Postcards	Released: 27 November 1993; Label: PolyGram TV	43
"—" denotes releases that did not chart.

=== Live albums ===
Title	Details	Peak chart positions
Title	Details	UK
Faith Alive!	Released: September 1965; Label: Parlophone; With the Roulettes and Chris Andrews	19

=== Soundtrack and cast recording albums ===
Title	Details	Peak chart positions
Title	Details	UK
Music from the film "Beat Girl"	Released: 1960; Label: Columbia (LP version 33 SX 1225 -18 tracks—EP version SEG 8138- 4 tracks ); Soundtrack to the film Beat Girl, in which Faith also stars; Faith sings on 3 tracks (LP) and 2 tracks (EP)	11
Fings Ain't Wot They Used T'Be	Released: 1960; Label: His Master's Voice; London studio cast recording of the musical of the same name; Faith sings on several tracks	—
Budgie – The Musical	Released: 1988; Label: MCA; London original cast recording of the musical of the same name	—
"—" denotes releases that did not chart.

=== Compilation albums ===
Title	Details	Peak chart positions
Title	Details	UK
It's Alright	Released: 1 March 1965; Label: Capitol; Canada-only release	—
Adam Faith	Released: March 1965; Label: Amy; US-only release	—
The Best of Adam Faith	Released: 1971; Label: Music for Pleasure	—
The Two Best Sides of Adam Faith	Released: 1978; Label: EMI	—
24 Golden Greats	Released: October 1981; Label: Warwick	61
Not Just a Memory	Released: June 1983; Label: See for Miles	—
The Adam Faith Singles Collection – His Greatest Hits	Released: January 1990; Label: EMI	—
The E.P. Collection	Released: 1991; Label: See for Miles	—
The Best of the EMI Years	Released: 1994; Label: EMI	—
The Very Best of Adam Faith	Released: 13 October 1997; Label: Music for Pleasure	—
Greatest Hits	Released: 27 July 1998; Label: EMI	—
The Adam Faith Collection	Released: 2001; Label: HMV EASY	—
A's B's & EP's	Released: 6 June 2003; Label: EMI Gold	—
The Very Best of Adam Faith	Released: 2 May 2005; Label: EMI	—
All the Hits	Released: 5 January 2009; Label: EMI Gold/Parlophone	—
Hits!	Released: 21 March 2011; Label: EMI	47
Complete Faith	Released: 4 April 2011; Label: EMI; 6xCD box set	—
What Do You Want? The Singles Collection 1958–1962	Released: 8 January 2016; Label: Jasmine	—
Extended Play...	Released: 27 May 2016; Label: Great Voices of the Century	—
Three Classic Albums Plus Singles	Released: 15 June 2018; Label: Reel to Reel Music	—
"—" denotes releases that did not chart or were not released in that territory.

== EPs ==
Title (Note: This is a list of EPs released in the UK. Various other EPs were released elsewhere.)	Details	Peak chart positions
Title	Details	UK
Adam's Hit Parade	Released: 15 September 1960; Label: Parlophone	1
Adam (No. 1)	Released: March 1961; Label: Parlophone	4
Adam (No. 2)	Released: March 1961; Label: Parlophone	—
Adam (No. 3)	Released: April 1961; Label: Parlophone	—
Adam's Hit Parade (Vol. 2)	Released: August 1961; Label: Parlophone	—
Adam Faith	Released: February 1962; Label: Parlophone	12
Music from the Film 'Beat Girl'	Released: February 1962; Label: Columbia	—
Adam Faith (No. 2)	Released: March 1962; Label: Parlophone	—
Adam Faith (No. 3)	Released: April 1962; Label: Parlophone	—
Adam's Hit Parade (Vol. 3)	Released: August 1962; Label: Parlophone	—
Adam's Latest Hits	Released: 1 March 1963; Label: Parlophone	—
Top of the Pops	Released: February 1964; Label: Parlophone; With the Roulettes	—
For You – Adam	Released: November 1964; Label: Parlophone	—
A Message to Martha from Adam	Released: 5 February 1965; Label: Parlophone	17
Songs and Things	Released: 4 June 1965; Label: Parlophone	—
Adam Faith	Released: October 1977; Label: EMI; Four of Faith's hits	—
"—" denotes releases that did not chart.

== Singles ==
Title (Note: Unless stated otherwise, the B-side is by the same artist as the A-side.)	Year	Peak chart positions						Label
Title	Year	UK	AUS	CAN	IRE	NZ	US	Label
"(Got A) Heartsick Feeling" b/w "Brother Heartache and Sister Tears"	1958	—	—	—	—	—	—	His Master's Voice
"Country Music Holiday" b/w "High School Confidential"	1958	—	—	—	—	—	—	His Master's Voice
"Ah, Poor Little Baby!" b/w "Runk Bunk"	1959	—	—	—	—	—	—	Top Rank
"What Do You Want?" b/w "From Now Until Forever"	1959	1	22	—	1	—	—	Parlophone
"Poor Me" b/w "The Reason"	1960	1	—	—	3	—	—	Parlophone
"Someone Else's Baby" b/w "Big Time"	1960	2	84	—	—	4	—	Parlophone
"When Johnny Comes Marching Home" b/w "Made You"	1960	5	81	—	—	— 7	—	Parlophone
"I Did What You Told Me" (US-only release) b/w "Johnny Comes Marching Home"	1960	—	—	—	—	—	—	Cub
"How About That!" b/w "With Open Arms"	1960	4	—	—	—	2	—	Parlophone
"Lonely Pup (In a Christmas Shop)" b/w "Greenfinger"	1960	4	—	—	9	—	—	Parlophone
"Who Am I?" b/w "This Is It"	1961	5	—	—	9	—	—	Parlophone
"Easy Going Me" b/w "Wonderin'"	1961	12	—	—	—	—	—	Parlophone
"Don't You Know It?" b/w "My Last Wish"	1961	12	—	—	2	—	—	Parlophone
"The Time Has Come" b/w "A Help-Each-Other Romance"	1961	4	—	—	5	—	—	Parlophone
"Lonesome" b/w "Watch Your Step"	1962	12	—	—	9	—	—	Parlophone
"As You Like It" b/w "Face to Face"	1962	5	—	—	4	8	—	Parlophone
"Don't That Beat All" b/w "Mix Me a Person"	1962	8	—	—	—	8	—	Parlophone
"Baby Take a Bow" b/w "Knocking on Wood"	1962	22	—	—	6	—	—	Parlophone
"What Now" b/w "What Have I Got"	1963	31	82	—	—	—	—	Parlophone
"Walkin' Tall" b/w "Just Mention My Name"	1963	23	—	—	—	—	—	Parlophone
"The First Time" (with the Roulettes) b/w "So Long Baby"	1963	5	66	—	—	7	—	Parlophone
"We Are in Love" (with the Roulettes) b/w "Made for Me" (UK); "What Now" (US)	1963	11	—	—	—	—	—	Parlophone
"If He Tells You" (with the Roulettes) b/w "Talk to Me"	1964	25	—	—	—	—	—	Parlophone
"I Love Being In Love with You" (with the Roulettes) b/w "It's Alright"	1964	33	—	—	—	—	—	Parlophone
"Only One Such as You" (with the Roulettes) b/w "I Just Don't Know"	1964	—	—	—	—	—	—	Parlophone
"It's Alright" (with the Roulettes; US and Canada-only release) b/w "I Just Don't Know" (US); "I Love Being in Love with You" (Canada); "Kentucky Bluebird (A Message to Martha)" (Australia)	1964	—	15	2	—	—	31	Amy / Capitol
"A Message to Martha (Kentucky Bluebird)" b/w "It Sounds Good to Me"	1964	12	—	—	—	—	—	Parlophone
"Stop Feeling Sorry for Yourself" b/w "I've Gotta See My Baby" (with the Roulettes)	1965	23	—	—	—	—	—	Parlophone
"Hand Me Down Things" b/w "Talk About Love"	1965	—	—	—	—	—	—	Parlophone
"Talk About Love" (US and Canada-only release) b/w "Stop Feeling Sorry for Yourself" (US); "If He Tells You" (Canada)	1965	—	—	2	—	—	97	Amy / Capitol
"Someone's Taken Maria Away" (with the Roulettes and Chris Andrews) b/w "I Can't Think of Anyone Else" (with the Roulettes)	1965	34	—	—	—	—	—	Parlophone
"I Don't Need That Kind of Lovin'" (with the Roulettes) b/w "I'm Used to Losing You"	1965	—	—	—	—	—	—	Parlophone
"Idle Gossip" b/w "If You Ever Need Me"	1966	—	—	—	—	—	—	Parlophone
"To Make a Big Man Cry" b/w "Here's Another Day"	1966	—	—	—	—	—	—	Parlophone
"Cheryl's Goin' Home" b/w "A Funny Kind of Love"	1966	46	—	—	—	—	—	Parlophone
"What More Can Anyone Do" b/w "You've Got a Way with Me"	1967	—	—	—	—	—	—	Parlophone
"Cowman, Milk Your Cow" b/w "Daddy, What'll Happen to Me"	1967	—	—	—	—	—	—	Parlophone
"To Hell with Love" b/w "Close the Door"	1967	—	—	—	—	—	—	Parlophone
"You Make My Life Worthwhile" b/w "Hey Little Lovin' Girl"	1968	—	—	—	—	—	—	Parlophone
"I Survived" b/w "In Your Life"	1974	53 (Note: "I Survived" peaked at number 3 on the UK Breakers, an extension of the UK Singles Chart.)	—	—	—	—	—	Warner Bros.
"Star Song" b/w "Maybe"	1974	—	—	—	—	—	—	Warner Bros.
"Stuck in the Middle" (with Roger Daltrey) b/w "The Promise"/"Not Without You" (Only by Faith)	1994	87	—	—	—	—	—	PolyGram TV
"—" denotes releases that did not chart or were not released in that territory.
