= List of UK top-ten singles in 1960 =

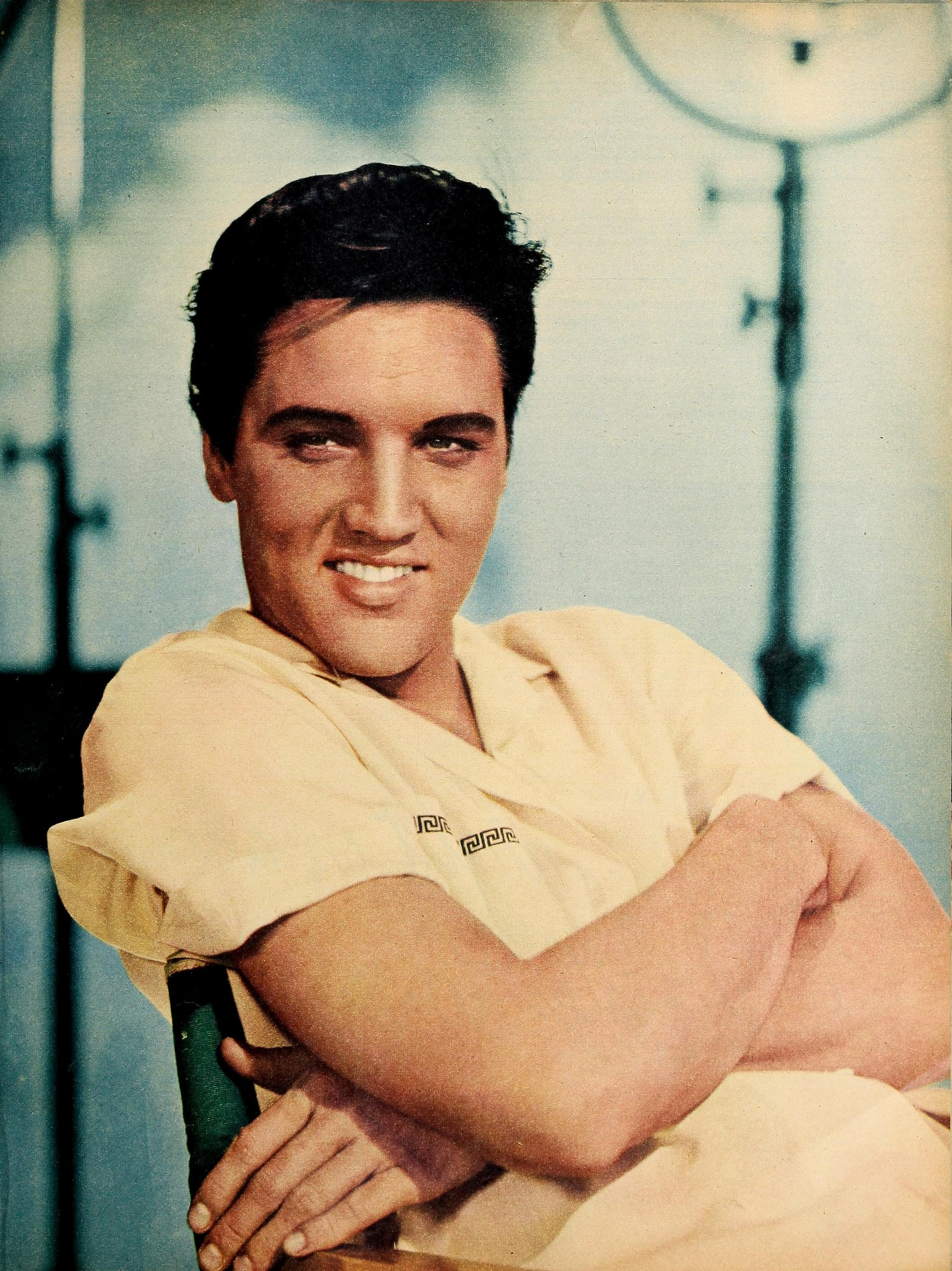
Elvis Presley achieved three top 10 entries in 1960, including the year's best-selling single, "It's Now or Never", which topped the chart for eight consecutive weeks, becoming his longest-running UK number-one hit.

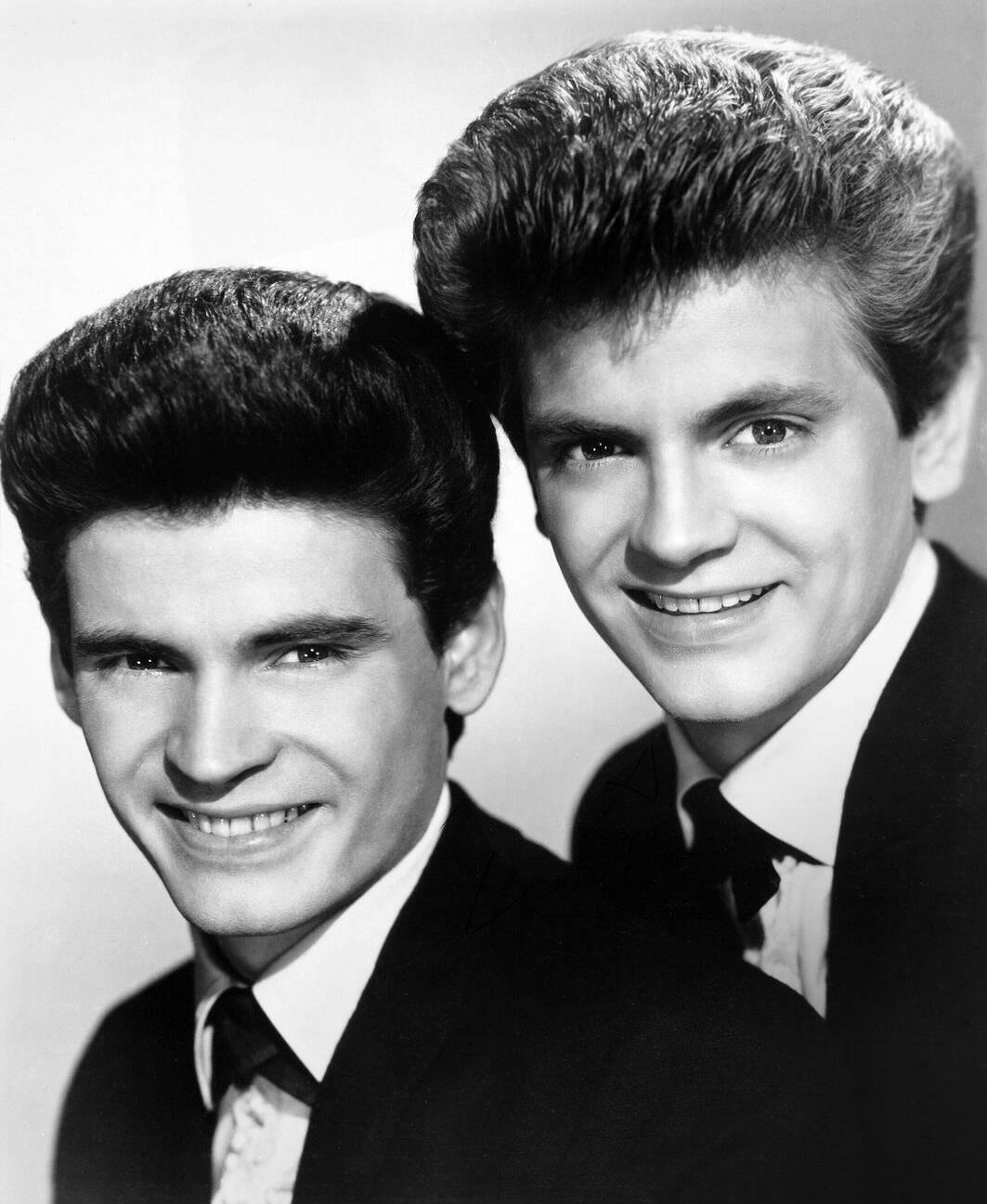
The Everly Brothers also enjoyed considerable success this year, securing three top 10 entries, including "Cathy's Clown", which spent seven weeks at number-one.

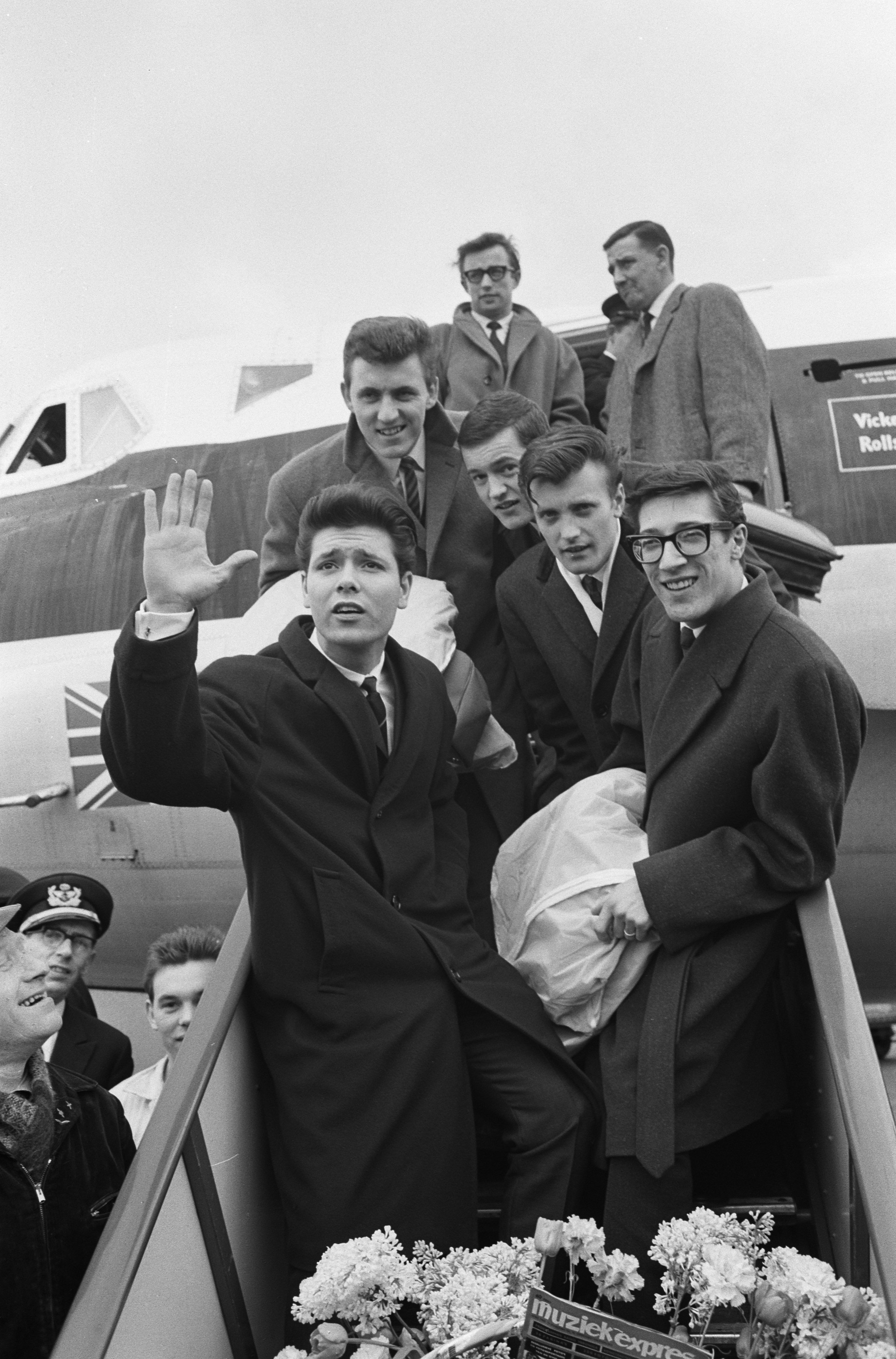
All of Cliff Richard's six top 10 entries in 1960 gave credit to The Shadows, while the group had two top 10 hits in their own right during the year, including the number-one single "Apache". In total, The Shadows had eight entries in the top 10 this year, more than any other artist.

The UK Singles Chart is one of many music charts compiled by the Official Charts Company that calculates the best-selling singles of the week in the United Kingdom. Before 2004, the chart was only based on the sales of physical singles. This list shows singles that peaked in the Top 10 of the UK Singles Chart during 1960, as well as singles which peaked in 1959 and 1961 but were in the top 10 in 1960. The entry date is when the single appeared in the top 10 for the first time (week ending, as published by the Official Charts Company, which is six days after the chart is announced).

Ninety-five singles were in the top ten in 1960. Ten singles from 1959 remained in the top 10 for several weeks at the beginning of the year, while "Poetry in Motion" by Johnny Tillotson was both released in 1960 but did not reach its peak until 1961. "Little White Bull" by Tommy Steele, "Rawhide" by Frankie Laine, "Seven Little Girls Sitting in the Backseat" by The Avons and "Staccato's Theme" by Elmer Bernstein, were the singles from 1959 to reach their peak in 1960. Twenty artists scored multiple entries in the top 10 in 1960. Acker Bilk, Billy Fury, The Drifters, Ken Dodd, Rolf Harris, Roy Orbison and Sam Cooke were among the many artists who achieved their first UK charting top 10 single in 1960.

The 1959 Christmas number-one, "What Do You Want to Make Those Eyes at Me For?" by Emile Ford & The Checkmates, remained at number-one for the first four weeks of 1960. The first new number-one single of the year was "Starry Eyed" by Michael Holliday. Overall, seventeen different singles peaked at number-one in 1960, with The Shadows (3, including two entries with Cliff Richard) having the most singles hit that position.

== Background ==
=== Multiple entries ===
Ninety-five singles charted in the top 10 in 1960, with eighty-seven singles reaching their peak this year.

Twenty artists scored multiple entries in the top 10 in 1960. The Shadows secured the record for most top 10 hits in 1960 with eight hit singles.

Jimmy Jones was one of a number of artists with two top-ten entries, including the number-one single "Good Timin'". Bobby Darin, Duane Eddy, Max Bygraves, Neil Sedaka and Tommy Steele were among the other artists who had multiple top 10 entries in 1960.

=== Chart debuts ===
Thirty artists achieved their first top 10 single in 1960, either as a lead or featured artist. Jimmy Jones and Johnny Preston both had one other entry in their breakthrough year.

The following table (collapsed on desktop site) does not include acts who had previously charted as part of a group and secured their first top 10 solo single.

Artist	Number of top 10s	First entry	Chart position	Other entries
Freddy Cannon	1	"Way Down Yonder in New Orleans"	3	—
Johnny Preston	2	"Running Bear"	1	"Cradle of Love" (2)
Mr. Acker Bilk & His Paramount Jazz Band	1	"Summer Set"	5	—
Marv Johnson	1	"You Got What It Takes"	7	—
Lance Fortune	1	"Be Mine (Alle Mädchen wollen küssen)"	4	—
Percy Faith	1	"Theme from A Summer Place"	2	—
Bobby Rydell	1	"Wild One"	7	—
Billy Fury	1	"Colette"	9	—
Jimmy Jones	2	"Handy Man"	3	"Good Timin'" (1)
The John Barry Seven	1	"Hit and Miss"	10	—
Brenda Lee	1	"Sweet Nothin's"	4	—
Steve Lawrence	1	"Footsteps"	4	—
Tommy Bruce and the Bruisers	1	"Ain't Misbehavin'"	3	—
Michael Cox	1	"Angela Jones"	7	—
Johnny Kidd & the Pirates	1	"Shakin' All Over"	1	—
Connie Stevens	1	"Sixteen Reasons"	9	—
Gary Mills	1	"Look for a Star"	7	—
Brian Hyland	1	"Itsy Bitsy Teenie Weenie Yellow Polkadot Bikini"	8	—
Rolf Harris	1	"Tie Me Kangaroo Down, Sport"	9	—
Ken Dodd	1	"Love is Like a Violin"	8	—
Ricky Valance	1	"Tell Laura I Love Her"	1	—
Roy Orbison	1	"Only the Lonely"	1	—
The Ventures	1	"Walk, Don't Run"	8	—
Sam Cooke	1	"Chain Gang"	9	—
Hank Locklin	1	"Please Help Me, I'm Falling"	9	—
Bob Luman	1	"Let's Think About Living"	6	—
Johnny Burnette	1	"Dreamin'"	5	—
The Drifters	1	"Save the Last Dance for Me"	2	—
Sophia Loren	1	"Goodness Gracious Me"	1	—
Peter Sellers	1	"Goodness Gracious Me"	1	—
Nina & Frederik	1	"Little Donkey"	3	—
Johnny Tillotson	1	"Poetry in Motion" ^{[A]}	1	—

Notes

The Shadows scored two singles independent of Cliff Richard for the first time in 1960, starting with "Apache" reaching number one in August. They followed it up with the double single "Man of Mystery"/"The Stranger" peaking at number 5 in December. Peter Sellers had previously achieved two top 10 singles as a member of The Goons.

=== Songs from films ===
Original songs from various films entered the top 10 throughout the year. These included "A Voice in the Wilderness" (from Expresso Bongo ), "Theme from "A Summer Place"" (A Summer Place), Do You Mind (Let's Get Married), "Because They're Young" (Because They're Young), "Itsy Bitsy Teenie Weenie Yellow Polkadot Bikini" (One, Two, Three) and "As Long as He Needs Me" (Oliver!).

Additionally, earlier versions of "Way Down Yonder in New Orleans" had appeared in several films prior to 1960, namely Is Everybody Happy? (1943), Somebody Loves Me (1952), The Benny Goodman Story (1955) and The Gene Krupa Story (1959). "Clementine" featured as background music in The Grapes of Wrath (under the title "Oh My Darling, Clementine") before it was recorded by Bobby Darin. Fats Waller produced an instrumental version of "Ain't Misbehavin'" in 1929 and this was re-recorded with vocals for the 1943 film Stormy Weather. "Apache" was inspired by the film of the same name, originally recorded in instrumental version by composer Jerry Lordan before famously being released by The Shadows. The comedy song "Goodness Gracious Me" was due to be included on the soundtrack of The Millionairess but it was rejected by the producers. The stand-alone single was eventually used to promote the film.

=== Best-selling singles ===
Until 1970 there was no universally recognised year-end best-sellers list. However, in 2011 the Official Charts Company released a list of the best-selling song of each year in chart history from 1952 to date. According to the list, "It's Now or Never" by Elvis Presley is officially recorded as the biggest-selling single of 1960. "It's Now or Never" (9) also ranked in the top 10 best-selling singles of the decade.

== Top-ten singles ==
Key

Symbol	Meaning
‡	Single peaked in 1959 but still in chart in 1960.
♦	Single released in 1960 but peaked in 1961.
(#)	Year-end best-selling single.
Entered	The date that the single first appeared in the chart.
Peak	Highest position that the single reached in the UK Singles Chart.

Entered (week ending)	Weeks in top 10	Single	Artist	Peak	Peak reached (week ending)	Weeks at peak
Singles in 1959
16 October 1959	13	"Travellin' Light" ‡	Cliff Richard & The Shadows	1	30 October 1959	5
30 October 1959	10	"Red River Rock" ‡ ^{[B]}	Johnny and the Hurricanes	3	13 November 1959	1
6 November 1959	15	"What Do You Want to Make Those Eyes at Me For?" ‡	Emile Ford & The Checkmates	1	18 December 1959	6
20 November 1959	12	"Oh! Carol" ‡	Neil Sedaka	3	18 December 1959	4
27 November 1959	11	"What Do You Want?" ‡	Adam Faith	1	4 December 1959	3
4 December 1959	8	"Seven Little Girls Sitting in the Backseat" ^{[C]}	The Avons	3	1 January 1960	1
11 December 1959	4	"Snow Coach" ‡	Russ Conway	7	25 December 1959	1
18 December 1959	4	"Rawhide" ^{[D]}	Frankie Laine	6	1 January 1960	1
25 December 1959	7	"Staccato's Theme"	Elmer Bernstein	4	15 January 1960	1
25 December 1959	6	"Little White Bull" ^{[E]}	Tommy Steele	6	8 January 1960	1
Singles in 1960
1 January 1960	1	"Jingle Bell Rock"	Max Bygraves	7	1 January 1960	1
8 January 1960	2	"Bad Boy"	Marty Wilde	7	8 January 1960	1
15 January 1960	7	"Starry Eyed"	Michael Holliday	1	29 January 1960	1
15 January 1960	8	"Way Down Yonder in New Orleans"	Freddy Cannon	3	12 February 1960	2
22 January 1960	11	"Why"	Anthony Newley	1	5 February 1960	4
22 January 1960	5	"Heartaches by the Number"	Guy Mitchell	5	5 February 1960	1
22 January 1960	9	"A Voice in the Wilderness"	Cliff Richard & The Shadows	2	5 February 1960	3
5 February 1960	9	"Poor Me"	Adam Faith	1	4 March 1960	2
12 February 1960	6	"Pretty Blue Eyes"	Craig Douglas	4	26 February 1960	1
12 February 1960	6	"On a Slow Boat to China" ^{[F]}	Emile Ford & The Checkmates	3	10 March 1960	1
12 February 1960	5	"Beyond the Sea"	Bobby Darin	8	12 February 1960	2
19 February 1960	10	"Running Bear"	Johnny Preston	1	17 March 1960	2
26 February 1960	4	"Summer Set"	Mr. Acker Bilk & His Paramount Jazz Band	5	10 March 1960	1
4 March 1960	6	"Delaware"	Perry Como	3	17 March 1960	2
10 March 1960	5	"You Got What It Takes" ^{[G]}	Marv Johnson	7	10 March 1960	1
17 March 1960	1	"Be Mine"	Lance Fortune	4	17 March 1960	1
17 March 1960	7	"Theme from A Summer Place"	Percy Faith	2	24 March 1960	1
24 March 1960	9	"My Old Man's a Dustman"	Lonnie Donegan	1	31 March 1960	4
24 March 1960	10	"Fall in Love with You"	Cliff Richard & The Shadows	2	14 April 1960	1
24 March 1960	2	"Wild One" ^{[H]}	Bobby Rydell	7	24 March 1960	1
24 March 1960	6	"Fings Ain't Wot They Used T'Be"	Max Bygraves	5	14 April 1960	2
24 March 1960	1	"Colette"	Billy Fury	9	24 March 1960	1
7 April 1960	10	"Do You Mind"	Anthony Newley	1	28 April 1960	1
7 April 1960	6	"Stuck on You"	Elvis Presley	3	21 April 1960	1
14 April 1960	13	"Handy Man"	Jimmy Jones	3	14 April 1960	5
14 April 1960	1	"Beatnik Fly"	Johnny and the Hurricanes	8	14 April 1960	1
21 April 1960	1	"Clementine"	Bobby Darin	8	21 April 1960	1
21 April 1960	1	"Hit and Miss"	The John Barry Seven	10	21 April 1960	1
28 April 1960	6	"Someone Else's Baby"	Adam Faith	2	19 May 1960	1
28 April 1960	11	"Cathy's Clown" ^{[I]}	The Everly Brothers	1	5 May 1960	7
28 April 1960	8	"Sweet Nothin's" ^{[J]}	Brenda Lee	4	2 June 1960	1
5 May 1960	1	"Standing on the Corner"	The King Brothers	4	5 May 1960	1
5 May 1960	7	"Footsteps"	Steve Lawrence	4	26 May 1960	1
12 May 1960	7	"Shazam!"	Duane Eddy	4	9 June 1960	1
19 May 1960	7	"Cradle of Love"	Johnny Preston	2	26 May 1960	3
26 May 1960	2	"The Heart of a Teenage Girl"	Craig Douglas	10	26 May 1960	2
2 June 1960	8	"Three Steps to Heaven"	Eddie Cochran	1	23 June 1960	2
9 June 1960	6	"I Wanna Go Home" ^{[K]}	Lonnie Donegan	5	23 June 1960	1
9 June 1960	8	"Mama"/"Robot Man" ^{[L]}	Connie Francis	2	23 June 1960	1
9 June 1960	2	"Stairway to Heaven"	Neil Sedaka	8	16 June 1960	1
23 June 1960	8	"Ain't Misbehavin'"	Tommy Bruce & the Bruisers	3	21 July 1960	1
23 June 1960	1	"That's You"	Nat King Cole	10	23 June 1960	1
30 June 1960	9	"Good Timin'"	Jimmy Jones	1	7 July 1960	3
30 June 1960	5	"When Johnny Comes Marching Home"/"Made You" ^{[M]}	Adam Faith	5	21 July 1960	1
30 June 1960	3	"Angela Jones" ^{[N]}	Michael Cox	7	14 July 1960	1
7 July 1960	4	"What a Mouth (What a North and South)"	Tommy Steele	5	7 July 1960	1
7 July 1960	13	"Please Don't Tease"	Cliff Richard & The Shadows	1	28 July 1960	3
7 July 1960	1	"Down Yonder"	Johnny and the Hurricanes	8	7 July 1960	1
7 July 1960	10	"Shakin' All Over"	Johnny Kidd & the Pirates	1	4 August 1960	1
14 July 1960	1	"Sixteen Reasons"	Connie Stevens	9	14 July 1960	1
28 July 1960	4	"If She Should Come to You" ^{[O]}	Anthony Newley	4	28 July 1960	1
28 July 1960	9	"When Will I Be Loved"	The Everly Brothers	4	25 August 1960	1
28 July 1960	2	"Look for a Star" ^{[P]}	Gary Mills	7	28 July 1960	1
4 August 1960	12	"Because They're Young"	Duane Eddy	2	8 September 1960	1
4 August 1960	13	"A Mess of Blues"	Elvis Presley	2	15 September 1960	2
4 August 1960	3	"Itsy Bitsy Teenie Weenie Yellow Polkadot Bikini"	Brian Hyland	8	11 August 1960	2
11 August 1960	11	"Apache"	The Shadows	1	25 August 1960	5
18 August 1960	3	"Tie Me Kangaroo Down, Sport"	Rolf Harris	9	18 August 1960	1
25 August 1960	3	"Love Is Like a Violin" ^{[Q]}	Ken Dodd	8	25 August 1960	3
1 September 1960	14	"As Long as He Needs Me" ^{[R]}	Shirley Bassey	2	27 October 1960	5
8 September 1960	3	"Paper Roses"	The Kaye Sisters	7	8 September 1960	1
8 September 1960	4	"Everybody's Somebody's Fool"	Connie Francis	5	15 September 1960	1
8 September 1960	1	"Lorelei"	Lonnie Donegan	10	8 September 1960	1
15 September 1960	8	"Tell Laura I Love Her"	Ricky Valance	1	29 September 1960	3
22 September 1960	10	"Only the Lonely"	Roy Orbison	1	20 October 1960	2
29 September 1960	6	"Nine Times Out of Ten"	Cliff Richard & The Shadows	3	6 October 1960	2
29 September 1960	7	"How About That!"	Adam Faith	4	13 October 1960	2
6 October 1960	8	"Lucille"/"So Sad (To Watch Good Love Go Bad)"	The Everly Brothers	4	20 October 1960	1
6 October 1960	1	"Walk, Don't Run"	The Ventures	8	6 October 1960	1
6 October 1960	2	"Chain Gang" ^{[S]}	Sam Cooke	9	27 October 1960	1
13 October 1960	2	"Please Help Me, I'm Falling" ^{[T]}	Hank Locklin	9	13 October 1960	1
20 October 1960	6	"Let's Think About Living" ^{[U]}	Bob Luman	6	27 October 1960	2
3 November 1960	12	"It's Now or Never" (#1) ^{[I]}	Elvis Presley	1	3 November 1960	8
3 November 1960	11	"Rocking Goose"	Johnny and the Hurricanes	3	17 November 1960	2
3 November 1960	5	"Dreamin'"	Johnny Burnette	5	10 November 1960	3
10 November 1960	3	"My Love for You"	Johnny Mathis	9	10 November 1960	1
17 November 1960	5	"My Heart Has a Mind of Its Own"	Connie Francis	3	24 November 1960	1
17 November 1960	9	"Man of Mystery"/"The Stranger" ^{[V]}	The Shadows	5	1 December 1960	2
17 November 1960	11	"Save the Last Dance for Me"	The Drifters	2	1 December 1960	4
24 November 1960	8	"Goodness Gracious Me" ^{[W]}	Peter Sellers & Sophia Loren	4	1 December 1960	1
1 December 1960	6	"Little Donkey"	Nina & Frederik	3	8 December 1960	1
8 December 1960	9	"I Love You"	Cliff Richard & The Shadows	1	29 December 1960	2
8 December 1960	6	"Strawberry Fair"	Anthony Newley	3	15 December 1960	2
15 December 1960	10	"Poetry in Motion" ♦	Johnny Tillotson	1	12 January 1961	2
15 December 1960	4	"Lonely Pup (In a Christmas Shop)"	Adam Faith	4	22 December 1960	2

== Entries by artist ==
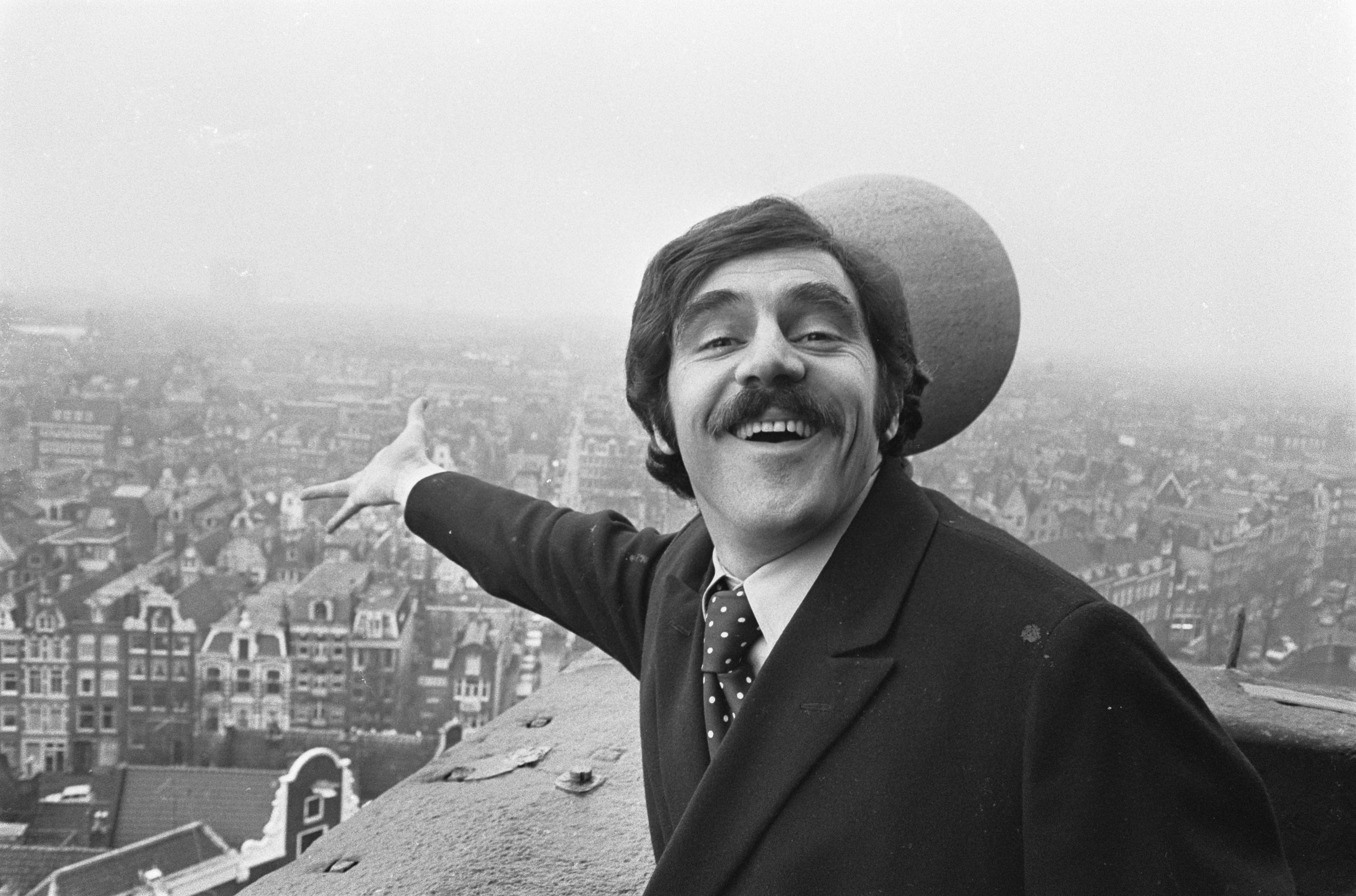
Anthony Newley secured four UK top 10 singles this year, including the number-one hits "Why" and "Do You Mind".

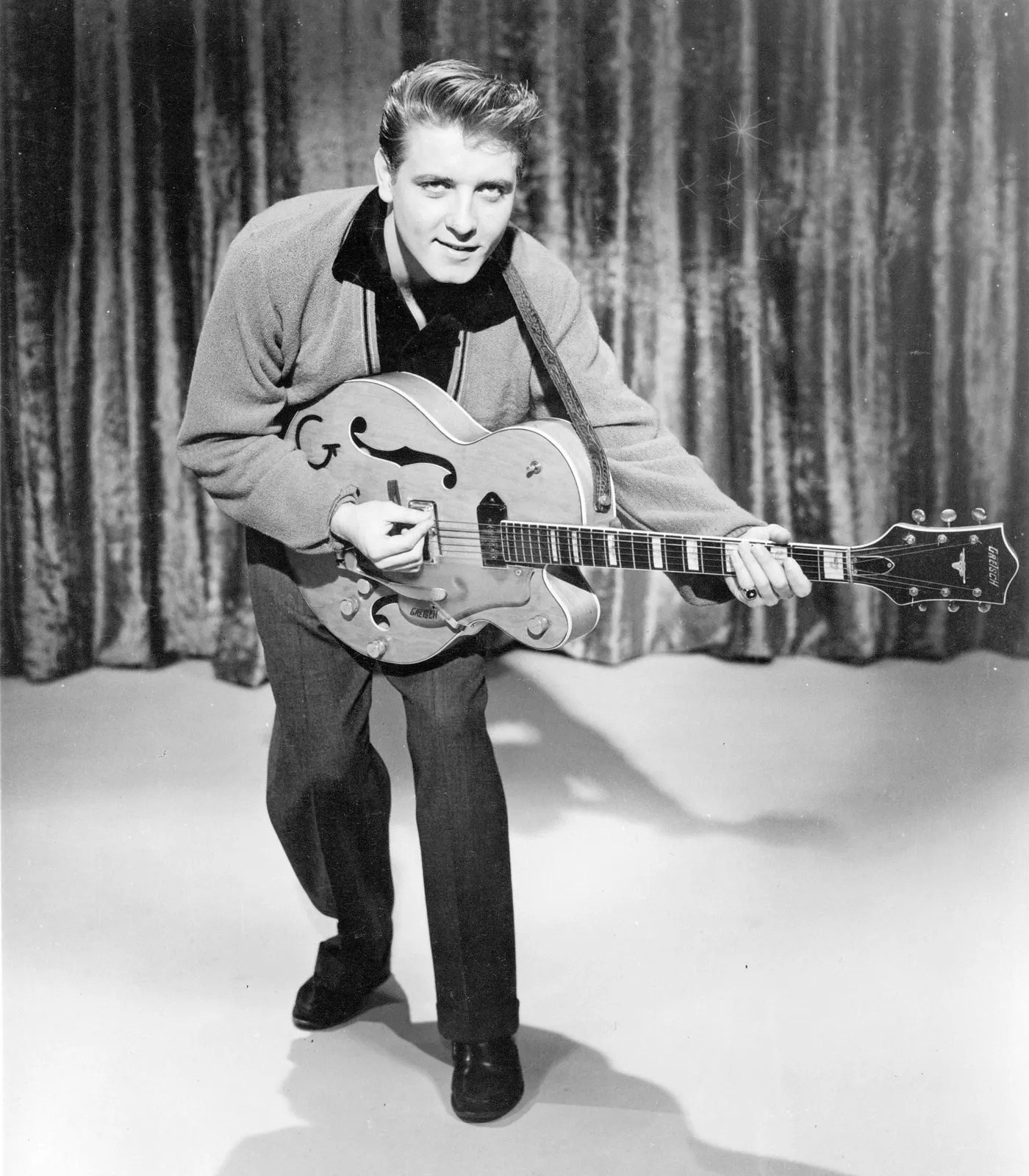
In June 1960, two months after his death in a car accident while on tour in the UK, Eddie Cochran achieved a posthumous number-one hit with "Three Steps to Heaven", which spent two weeks at the top spot.

The following table shows artists who achieved two or more top 10 entries in 1960, including singles that reached their peak in 1959 or 1961. The figures include both main artists and featured artists. The total number of weeks an artist spent in the top ten in 1960 is also shown.

Entries	Artist	Weeks	Singles
8	The Shadows ^{[X]}^{[Y]}	65	"Apache", "A Voice in the Wilderness", "Fall in Love with You", "I Love You", "Man of Mystery"/"The Stranger", "Nine Times Out of Ten", "Please Don't Tease", "Travellin' Light"
6	Adam Faith ^{[X]}	35	"How About That!", "Lonely Pup (In a Christmas Shop)", "Poor Me", "Someone Else's Baby", "What Do You Want?", "When Johnny Comes Marching Home"/"Made You"
6	Cliff Richard ^{[X]}^{[Y]}	48	"A Voice in the Wilderness", "Fall in Love with You", "I Love You", "Nine Times Out of Ten", "Please Don't Tease", "Travellin' Light"
4	Anthony Newley	28	"Do You Mind", "If She Should Come to You", "Strawberry Fair", "Why"
4	Johnny and the Hurricanes ^{[X]}	11	"Beatnik Fly", "Down Yonder", "Red River Rock", "Rocking Goose"
3	Connie Francis	16	"Everybody's Somebody's Fool", "Mama"/"Robot Man", "My Heart Has a Mind of Its Own"
3	Elvis Presley	27	"A Mess of Blues", "It's Now or Never", "Stuck on You"
3	The Everly Brothers	26	"Cathy's Clown", "Lucille"/"So Sad (To Watch Good Love Go Bad)", "When Will I Be Loved"
3	Lonnie Donegan	16	"I Wanna Go Home", "Lorelei", "My Old Man's a Dustman"
2	Bobby Darin	6	"Clementine", "Beyond the Sea"
2	Craig Douglas	8	"Pretty Blue Eyes", "The Heart of a Teenage Girl"
2	Duane Eddy	19	"Because They're Young", "Shazam!"
2	Emile Ford & The Checkmates ^{[X]}	13	"On a Slow Boat to China", "What Do You Want to Make Those Eyes at Me For?"
2	Jimmy Jones	22	"Good Timin'", "Handy Man"
2	Johnny Preston	17	"Cradle of Love", "Running Bear"
2	Max Bygraves	7	"Fings Ain't Wot They Used T'Be", "Jingle Bell Rock"
2	Neil Sedaka ^{[X]}	8	"Oh! Carol", "Stairway to Heaven"
2	Tommy Steele ^{[Z]}	9	"Little White Bull", "What a Mouth (What a North and South)"

== Notes ==
- ^{a} "Poetry in Motion" reached its peak of number one on 18 January 1961 (week ending).
- ^{b} "Red River Rock" re-entered the top 10 at number 10 on 14 January 1960 (week ending).
- ^{c} "Seven Little Girls Sitting in the Backseat" re-entered the top 10 at number 10 on 4 February 1960 (week ending).
- ^{d} "Rawhide" re-entered the top 10 at number 6 on 7 January 1960 (week ending) for 3 weeks.
- ^{e} "Little White Bull" re-entered the top 10 at number 10 on 11 February 1960 (week ending).
- ^{f} "On a Slow Boat to China" re-entered the top 10 at number 10 on 6 April 1960 (week ending).
- ^{g} "You Got What It Takes" re-entered the top 10 at number 9 on 6 April 1960 (week ending) for 3 weeks.
- ^{h} "Wild One" re-entered the top 10 at number 9 on 13 April 1960 (week ending).
- ^{i} "Cathy's Clown" is recorded as the best-selling single of the year by some sources but the Official Charts Company lists "It's Now or Never" as its best-seller.
- ^{j} "Sweet Nothin's" re-entered the top 10 at number 9 on 22 June 1960 (week ending) for 2 weeks.
- ^{k} "I Wanna Go Home" re-entered the top 10 at number 9 on 27 July 1960 (week ending) for 2 weeks.
- ^{l} "Mama"/"Robot Man" re-entered the top 10 at number 7 on 10 August 1960 (week ending).
- ^{m} "When Johnny Comes Marching Home"/"Made You" re-entered the top 10 at number 6 on 20 July 1960 (week ending) for 4 weeks.
- ^{n} "Angela Jones" re-entered the top 10 at number 7 on 20 July 1960 (week ending) for 2 weeks.
- ^{o} "If She Should Come to You" re-entered the top 10 at number 6 on 24 August 1960 (week ending) for 3 weeks.
- ^{p} "Look for a Star" re-entered the top 10 at number 9 on 17 August 1960 (week ending).
- ^{q} "Love is Like a Violin" re-entered the top 10 at number 8 on 21 September 1960 (week ending).
- ^{r} "As Long as He Needs Me" re-entered the top 10 at number 5 on 19 October 1960 (week ending) for 9 weeks.
- ^{s} "Chain Gang" re-entered the top 10 at number 9 on 2 November 1960 (week ending).
- ^{t} "Please Help Me, I'm Falling" re-entered the top 10 at number 10 on 2 November 1960 (week ending).
- ^{u} "Let's Think About Living" re-entered the top 10 at number 10 on 7 December 1960 (week ending).
- ^{v} "Man of Mystery"/"The Stranger" re-entered the top 10 at number 7 on 18 January 1961 (week ending) for 2 weeks.
- ^{w} "Goodness Gracious Me" re-entered the top 10 at number 7 on 11 January 1960 (week ending) for 3 weeks.
- ^{x} Figure includes single that peaked in 1959.
- ^{y} Figure includes single that peaked in 1961.
- ^{z} Figure includes single that first charted in 1959 but peaked in 1960.

== See also ==
- 1960 in British music
- List of number-one singles from the 1960s (UK)
