= List of UK top-ten singles in 1961 =

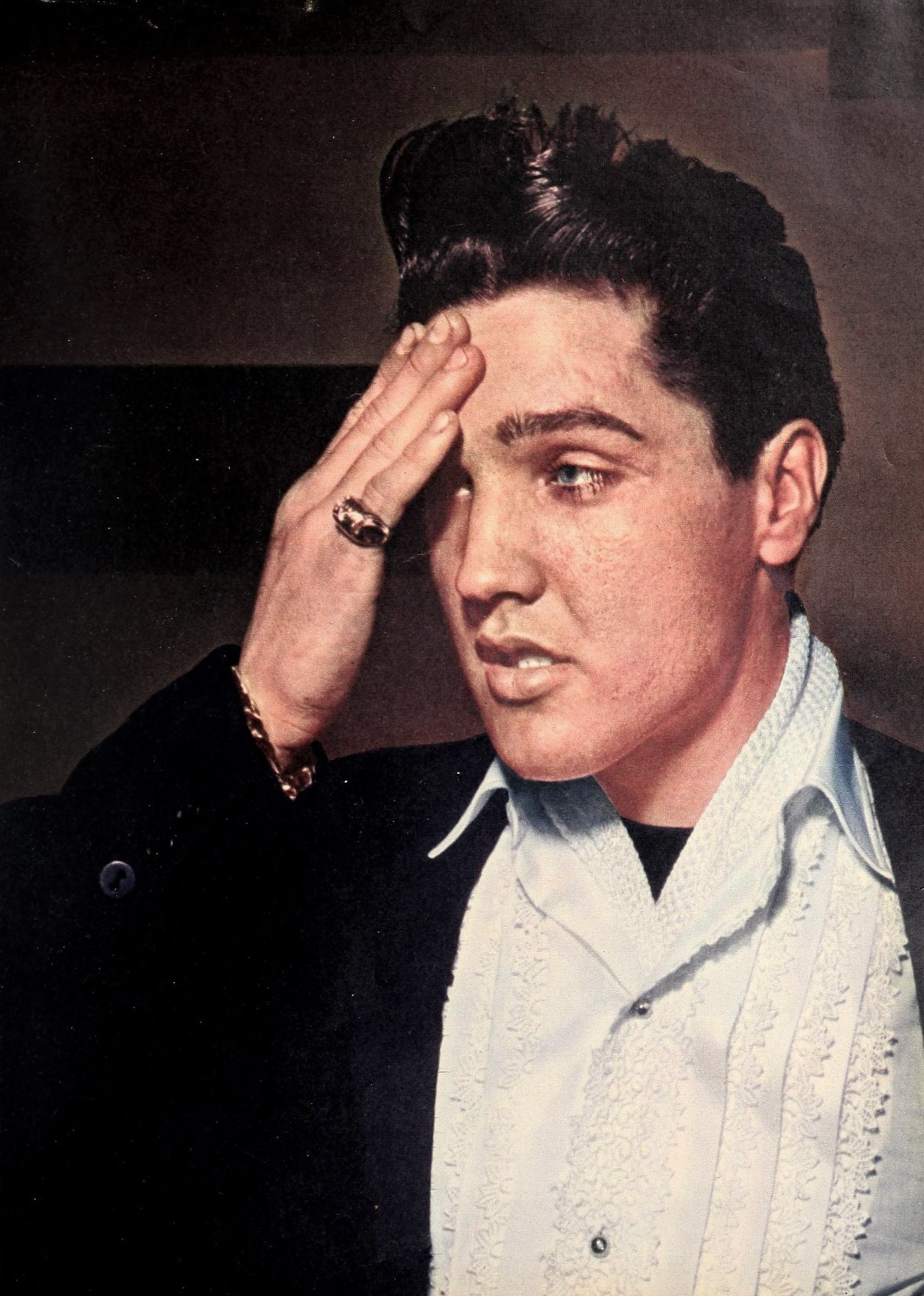
Elvis Presley had the best-selling single of 1961 with "Wooden Heart", which spent eleven weeks in the top 10, six of which were at number-one. In total, Presley had six top-ten singles during the year, five of which reached number-one.

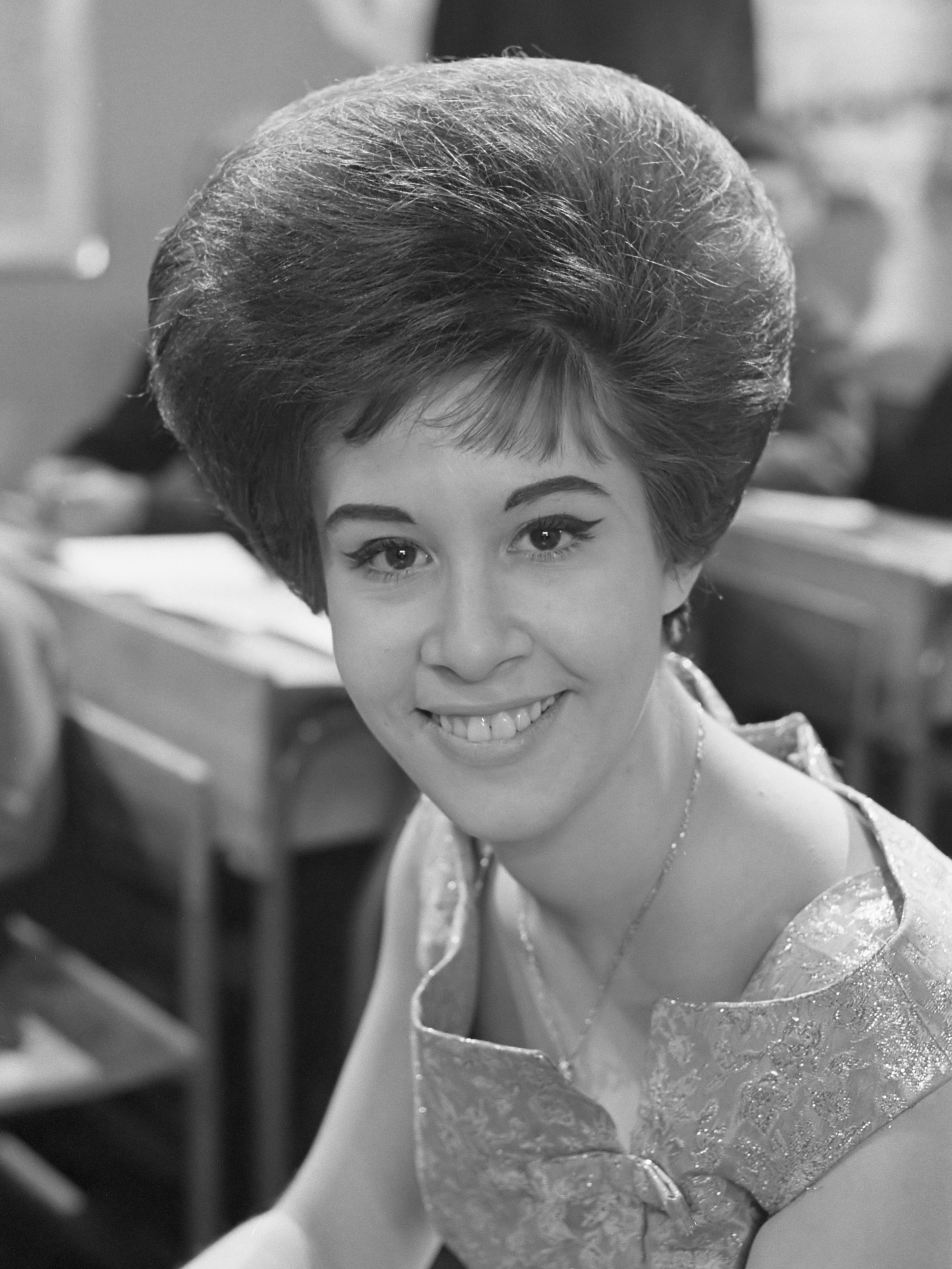
Helen Shapiro had three top 10 singles this year, including the number-ones "You Don't Know" and "Walkin' Back to Happiness". Aged 14 years and 11 months old when "You Don't Know" topped the chart, Shapiro remains the youngest female artist to have a UK number-one single.

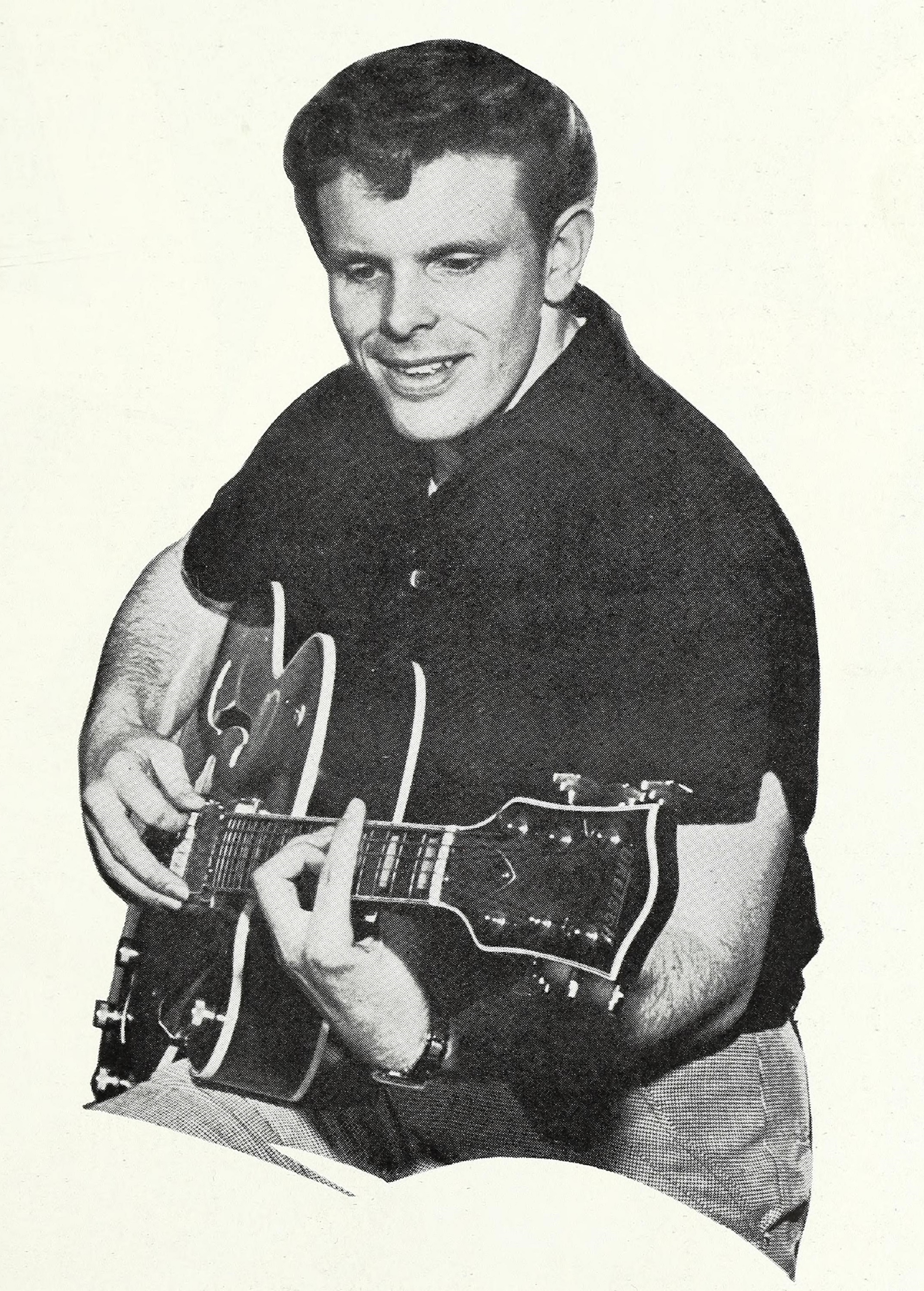
Del Shannon made his UK top 10 debut in 1961 with "Runaway", which spent three weeks at number-one. He secured a second top 10 hit later in the year with "Hats Off to Larry", which peaked at number six.

The UK Singles Chart is one of many music charts compiled by the Official Charts Company that calculates the best-selling singles of the week in the United Kingdom. Before 2004, the chart was only based on the sales of physical singles. This list shows singles that peaked in the Top 10 of the UK Singles Chart during 1961, as well as singles which peaked in 1960 and 1962 but were in the top 10 in 1961. The entry date is when the single appeared in the top 10 for the first time (week ending, as published by the Official Charts Company, which is six days after the chart is announced).

One-hundred and seven singles were in the top ten in 1961. Ten singles from 1960 remained in the top 10 for several weeks at the beginning of the year, while "Midnight in Moscow" by Kenny Ball and His Jazzmen, "Stranger on the Shore" by Mr. Acker Bilk, "Let There Be Drums" by Sandy Nelson and "Happy Birthday Sweet Sixteen" by Neil Sedaka were all released in 1961 but did not reach their peak until 1962. "Poetry in Motion" by John Tillotson was the only single from 1960 to reach its peak in 1961. Twenty-eight artists scored multiple entries in the top 10 in 1961. Bobby Vee, Del Shannon, Eden Kane, Helen Shapiro, Kenny Ball and Matt Monro were among the many artists who achieved their first UK charting top 10 single in 1961.

The 1960 Christmas number-one, "I Love You" by Cliff Richard, remained at number one for the first week of 1961. The first new number-one single of the year was "Poetry in Motion" by Johnny Tillotson. Overall, twenty-one different singles peaked at number-one in 1961, with Elvis Presley (4) having the most singles hit that position.

== Background ==
=== Multiple entries ===
One-hundred and seven singles charted in the top 10 in 1961, with ninety-four singles reaching their peak this year. Three songs were recorded by several artists with each version reaching the top 10:

- "Michael, Row the Boat Ashore" – The Highwaymen (version known as "Michael"), Lonnie Donegan (version known as "Michael, Row the Boat")
- "Rubber Ball" – Bobby Vee, Marty Wilde
- "Sailor" – Anne Shelton, Petula Clark

Twenty-eight artists scored multiple entries in the top 10 in 1961. The Shadows secured the record for most top 10 hits in 1961 with nine hit singles, four of which were with Cliff Richard.

The Everly Brothers was one of a number of artists with two top-ten entries, including the number-one single "Walk Right Back"/"Ebony Eyes". Craig Douglas, Eden Kane, Matt Monro, Petula Clark and The Temperance Seven were among the other artists who had multiple top 10 entries in 1961.

=== Chart debuts ===
Twenty-eight artists achieved their first top 10 single in 1961, either as a lead or featured artist. Of these, seven went on to record another hit single that year: Clarence "Frogman" Henry, Del Shannon, Eden Kane, John Leyton, Karl Denver, Matt Monro and The Temperance Seven. Helen Shapiro achieved two more chart hits in 1961. Bobby Vee had three other entries in his breakthrough year.

The following table (collapsed on desktop site) does not include acts who had previously charted as part of a group and secured their first top 10 solo single.

Artist	Number of top 10s	First entry	Chart position	Other entries
Matt Monro	2	"Portrait of My Love"	3	"My Kind of Girl" (5)
Bobby Vee	4	"Rubber Ball"	4	"More Than I Can Say"/"Stayin' In" (4), "How Many Tears" (10), "Take Good Care of My Baby" (3)
The Shirelles	1	"Will You Love Me Tomorrow"	4	—
The Allisons	1	"Are You Sure?"	2	—
The Ramrods	1	"Riders in the Sky"	8	—
The String-A-Longs	1	"Wheels"	8	—
Ferrante & Teicher	1	"Theme from Exodus"	6	—
The Temperance Seven	2	"You're Driving Me Crazy"	1	"Pasadena" (4)
The Marcels	1	"Blue Moon"	1	—
The Brook Brothers	1	"Warpaint"	5	—
Helen Shapiro	3	"Don't Treat Me Like a Child"	3	"You Don't Know" (1), "Walkin' Back to Happiness" (1)
Floyd Cramer	1	"On the Rebound"	1	—
Del Shannon	2	"Runaway"	1	"Hats Off to Larry" (6)
Clarence "Frogman" Henry"	2	"But I Do"	3	"You Always Hurt the One You Love" (6)
Linda Scott	1	"I've Told Every Little Star"	7	—
Eden Kane	2	"Well I Ask You"	1	"Get Lost" (10)
John Leyton	2	"Johnny Remember Me"	1	"Wild Wind" (2)
Gary U.S. Bonds	1	"Quarter to Three"	7	—
Karl Denver	2	"Marcheta"	8	"Mexicali Rose" (8)
The Highwaymen	1	"Michael"	1	—
Cleo Laine	1	"You'll Answer to Me"	5	—
Tony Orlando	1	"Bless You"	5	—
The Laurie Johnson Orchestra	1	"Sucu Sucu"	9	—
Ray Charles	1	"Hit the Road Jack"	6	—
Jimmy Dean	1	"Big Bad John"	2	—
The Dave Brubeck Quartet	1	"Take Five"	6	—
Danny Williams	1	"Moon River"	1	—
Kenny Ball and His Jazzmen	1	"Midnight in Moscow" ^{[A]}	2	—

=== Songs from films ===
Original songs from various films entered the top 10 throughout the year. These included "Wooden Heart" (from G.I. Blues), "Theme from Exodus" (Exodus), "Where the Boys Are" (Where the Boys Are), "The Frightened City" (The Frightened City), "Climb Ev'ry Mountain" (The Sound of Music), "Wild in the Country" (Wild in the Country), "When the Girl in Your Arms Is the Girl in Your Heart" (The Young Ones) and "The Time Has Come" (What a Whopper)

Additionally, the original Spanish language version of "Perfidia" sung by Desi Arnaz featured in the 1941 film Father Takes a Wife. Duane Eddy covered the title song to the comedy film Pepe. Shirley Jones had been responsible for the version on the soundtrack. American songwriter Hoagy Carmichael's recording of "(Up a) Lazy River" (simply called "Lazy River" when released by Bobby Darin) was briefly heard in the 1946 film The Best Years of Our Lives, as well as the 1959 film Hey Boy! Hey Girl!. The Marcels' version of "Blue Moon" was referenced in the Disney animated short-film A Symposium on Popular Songs. "You'll Never Know" was first introduced in the 1943 film Hello, Frisco, Hello, sung by Alice Faye, winning the Academy Award for Best Original Song at that year's ceremony.

Elvis Presley covered "What'd I Say", originally by Ray Charles, and it featured in the 1964 film Viva Las Vegas. "Mexicali Rose" appeared in the 1939 film of the same name. Similarly, "You Must Have Been a Beautiful Baby" was on the soundtrack the previous year to the film Hard to Get. "Moon River" was written for Breakfast at Tiffany's to be performed by Audrey Hepburn. Johnny Burnette's song "You're Sixteen" would later feature prominently in the 1973 film American Graffiti.

=== Best-selling singles ===
Until 1970 there was no universally recognised year-end best-sellers list. However, in 2011 the Official Charts Company released a list of the best-selling single of each year in chart history from 1952 to date. According to the list, "Wooden Heart" by Elvis Presley is officially recorded as the biggest-selling single of 1961.

== Top-ten singles ==
Key

Symbol	Meaning
‡	Single peaked in 1960 but still in chart in 1961.
♦	Single released in 1961 but peaked in 1962.
(#)	Year-end best-selling single.
Entered	The date that the single first appeared in the chart.
Peak	Highest position that the single reached in the UK Singles Chart.

Entered (week ending)	Weeks in top 10	Single	Artist	Peak	Peak reached (week ending)	Weeks at peak
Singles in 1960
3 November 1960	12	"It's Now or Never" ‡	Elvis Presley	1	3 November 1960	8
3 November 1960	11	"Rocking Goose" ‡	Johnny and the Hurricanes	3	17 November 1960	2
17 November 1960	11	"Save the Last Dance for Me" ‡	The Drifters	2	1 December 1960	4
17 November 1960	9	"Man of Mystery"/"The Stranger" ‡ ^{[B]}	The Shadows	5	1 December 1960	2
24 November 1960	8	"Goodness Gracious Me" ‡ ^{[C]}	Peter Sellers & Sophia Loren	4	1 December 1960	1
1 December 1960	6	"Little Donkey" ‡	Nina & Frederik	3	8 December 1960	1
8 December 1960	9	"I Love You" ‡	Cliff Richard & The Shadows	1	29 December 1960	2
8 December 1960	6	"Strawberry Fair" ‡	Anthony Newley	3	15 December 1960	2
15 December 1960	10	"Poetry in Motion"	Johnny Tillotson	1	12 January 1961	2
15 December 1960	4	"Lonely Pup (In a Christmas Shop)" ‡	Adam Faith	4	22 December 1960	2
Singles in 1961
5 January 1961	4	"Perfidia"	The Ventures	4	19 January 1961	1
12 January 1961	5	"Portrait of My Love"	Matt Monro	3	19 January 1961	2
19 January 1961	4	"Counting Teardops"	Emile Ford & The Checkmates	4	26 January 1961	1
19 January 1961	6	"Pepe"	Duane Eddy	2	2 February 1961	1
26 January 1961	7	"Are You Lonesome Tonight?"	Elvis Presley	1	26 January 1961	4
26 January 1961	4	"Buona Sera"	Mr. Acker Bilk & His Paramount Jazz Band	7	16 February 1961	1
26 January 1961	6	"You're Sixteen"	Johnny Burnette	3	16 February 1961	1
2 February 1961	7	"Sailor" ^{[D]}	Petula Clark	1	23 February 1961	1
2 February 1961	4	"Rubber Ball"	Bobby Vee	4	16 February 1961	1
9 February 1961	1	"Sailor"	Anne Shelton	10	9 February 1961	1
16 February 1961	9	"FBI" ^{[E]}	The Shadows	6	16 February 1961	3
16 February 1961	11	"Walk Right Back"/"Ebony Eyes"	The Everly Brothers	1	2 March 1961	3
16 February 1961	1	"Rubber Ball"	Marty Wilde	9	16 February 1961	1
23 February 1961	4	"Who Am I?"/"This Is It"	Adam Faith	5	23 February 1961	1
23 February 1961	7	"Will You Love Me Tomorrow"	The Shirelles	4	9 March 1961	1
23 February 1961	3	"Calendar Girl"	Neil Sedaka	8	2 March 1961	1
2 March 1961	10	"Are You Sure?" ^{[F]}	The Allisons	2	9 March 1961	6
2 March 1961	6	"Riders in the Sky"	The Ramrods	8	23 March 1961	1
9 March 1961	7	"Theme for a Dream"	Cliff Richard & The Shadows	3	16 March 1961	3
16 March 1961	11	"Wooden Heart" (#1)	Elvis Presley	1	23 March 1961	6
16 March 1961	1	"Wheels"	The String-A-Longs	8	16 March 1961	1
16 March 1961	6	"My Kind of Girl"	Matt Monro	5	23 March 1961	2
23 March 1961	6	"Theme from Exodus"	Ferrante & Teicher	6	20 April 1961	1
30 March 1961	1	"And the Heavens Cried"	Anthony Newley	6	13 April 1961	1
30 March 1961	4	"Lazy River" ^{[G]}	Bobby Darin	2	27 April 1961	1
13 April 1961	3	"Where the Boys Are"/"Baby Roo" ^{[H]}	Connie Francis	5	27 April 1961	1
20 April 1961	7	"You're Driving Me Crazy"	The Temperance Seven	1	25 May 1961	1
27 April 1961	2	"Gee Whizz It's You"	Cliff Richard & The Shadows	4	4 May 1961	1
27 April 1961	7	"Blue Moon"	The Marcels	1	4 May 1961	2
27 April 1961	4	"Warpaint" ^{[I]}	The Brook Brothers	5	4 May 1961	1
4 May 1961	6	"Don't Treat Me Like a Child" ^{[J]}	Helen Shapiro	3	11 May 1961	1
4 May 1961	4	"Theme from Dixie"	Duane Eddy	7	11 May 1961	2
4 May 1961	2	"African Waltz"	Johnny Dankworth	9	4 May 1961	1
11 May 1961	6	"More Than I Can Say"/"Stayin' In"	Bobby Vee	4	11 May 1961	5
11 May 1961	5	"On the Rebound"	Floyd Cramer	1	18 May 1961	1
11 May 1961	3	"A Hundred Pounds of Clay"	Craig Douglas	9	11 May 1961	1
18 May 1961	12	"Runaway"	Del Shannon	1	29 June 1961	3
18 May 1961	9	"The Frightened City"	The Shadows	3	1 June 1961	3
1 June 1961	7	"Surrender"	Elvis Presley	1	1 June 1961	4
1 June 1961	4	"You'll Never Know"	Shirley Bassey	6	15 June 1961	1
1 June 1961	2	"What'd I Say"	Jerry Lee Lewis	10	1 June 1961	2
8 June 1961	7	"But I Do"	Clarence "Frogman" Henry	3	22 June 1961	1
15 June 1961	1	"Have a Drink on Me"	Lonnie Donegan	8	15 June 1961	1
15 June 1961	15	"Halfway to Paradise"	Billy Fury	3	3 August 1961	2
15 June 1961	3	"I've Told Every Little Star"	Linda Scott	7	22 June 1961	1
22 June 1961	12	"Hello Mary Lou"/"Travelin' Man"	Ricky Nelson	2	6 July 1961	2
22 June 1961	1	"Little Devil"	Neil Sedaka	9	22 June 1961	1
22 June 1961	9	"Pasadena" ^{[K]}	The Temperance Seven	4	29 June 1961	2
29 June 1961	9	"Temptation"	The Everly Brothers	1	20 July 1961	2
29 June 1961	3	"Running Scared" ^{[L]}	Roy Orbison	9	29 June 1961	1
6 July 1961	6	"A Girl Like You"	Cliff Richard & The Shadows	3	20 July 1961	1
13 July 1961	11	"Well I Ask You"	Eden Kane	1	3 August 1961	1
20 July 1961	12	"You Don't Know" ^{[M]}	Helen Shapiro	1	10 August 1961	3
27 July 1961	4	"Time" ^{[N]}	Craig Douglas	9	27 July 1961	3
27 July 1961	7	"Romeo"	Petula Clark	3	24 August 1961	1
3 August 1961	4	"You Always Hurt the One You Love"	Clarence "Frogman" Henry	6	10 August 1961	1
17 August 1961	10	"Johnny Remember Me"	John Leyton	1	31 August 1961	4
17 August 1961	8	"Reach For The Stars"/"Climb Ev'ry Mountain	Shirley Bassey	1	21 September 1961	1
31 August 1961	3	"Quarter to Three"	Gary U.S. Bonds	7	31 August 1961	1
31 August 1961	2	"Marcheta"	Karl Denver	8	31 August 1961	2
7 September 1961	2	"That's My Home"	Mr. Acker Bilk & His Paramount Jazz Band	7	7 September 1961	1
14 September 1961	6	"Wild in the Country"/"I Feel So Bad"	Elvis Presley	4	14 September 1961	2
14 September 1961	7	"Kon-Tiki"	The Shadows	1	5 October 1961	1
14 September 1961	2	"How Many Tears"	Bobby Vee	10	14 September 1961	2
21 September 1961	1	"Michael, Row the Boat"/"Lumbered"	Lonnie Donegan	6	21 September 1961	1
21 September 1961	2	"Cupid"	Sam Cooke	7	21 September 1961	1
28 September 1961	5	"Jealousy"	Billy Fury	2	5 October 1961	1
28 September 1961	5	"Michael"	The Highwaymen	1	12 October 1961	1
28 September 1961	6	"You'll Answer to Me"	Cleo Laine	5	19 October 1961	1
28 September 1961	4	"Together"	Connie Francis	6	12 October 1961	1
5 October 1961	4	"Hats Off to Larry"	Del Shannon	6	26 October 1961	1
5 October 1961	1	"Get Lost"	Eden Kane	10	5 October 1961	1
12 October 1961	11	"Walkin' Back to Happiness"	Helen Shapiro	1	19 October 1961	3
19 October 1961	5	"Wild Wind"	John Leyton	2	26 October 1961	2
26 October 1961	6	"When the Girl in Your Arms Is the Girl in Your Heart"	Cliff Richard	3	2 November 1961	2
26 October 1961	4	"Bless You"	Tony Orlando	5	2 November 1961	1
26 October 1961	3	"Sucu Sucu" ^{[O]}	The Laurie Johnson Orchestra	9	26 October 1961	2
2 November 1961	8	"(Marie's the Name) His Latest Flame"/"Little Sister"	Elvis Presley	1	9 November 1961	4
2 November 1961	3	"Hit the Road Jack" ^{[P]}	Ray Charles	6	9 November 1961	1
2 November 1961	2	"Mexicali Rose"	Karl Denver	8	2 November 1961	1
2 November 1961	1	"You Must Have Been a Beautiful Baby"	Bobby Darin	10	2 November 1961	1
9 November 1961	7	"Big Bad John"	Jimmy Dean	2	23 November 1961	1
9 November 1961	6	"The Time Has Come"	Adam Faith	4	23 November 1961	1
9 November 1961	5	"Take Five"	The Dave Brubeck Quartet	6	16 November 1961	1
16 November 1961	7	"Take Good Care of My Baby"	Bobby Vee	3	14 December 1961	2
23 November 1961	7	"Tower of Strength"	Frankie Vaughan	1	7 December 1961	3
23 November 1961	9	"Moon River"	Danny Williams	1	28 December 1961	2
30 November 1961	1	"The Savage"	The Shadows	10	30 November 1961	1
7 December 1961	9	"Midnight in Moscow" ♦	Kenny Ball & His Jazzmen	2	4 January 1962	1
7 December 1961	2	"I'll Get By (As Long as I Have You)"	Shirley Bassey	10	7 December 1961	2
14 December 1961	3	"My Friend the Sea"	Petula Clark	7	21 December 1961	1
21 December 1961	5	"Johnny Will"	Pat Boone	4	21 December 1961	2
21 December 1961	17	"Stranger on the Shore" ♦ ^{[Q]}	Mr. Acker Bilk	2	11 January 1962	3
28 December 1961	6	"Let There Be Drums" ♦	Sandy Nelson	3	4 January 1962	2
28 December 1961	2	"Toy Balloons"	Russ Conway	7	28 December 1961	1
28 December 1961	8	"Happy Birthday Sweet Sixteen" ♦	Neil Sedaka	3	25 January 1962	2

== Entries by artist ==
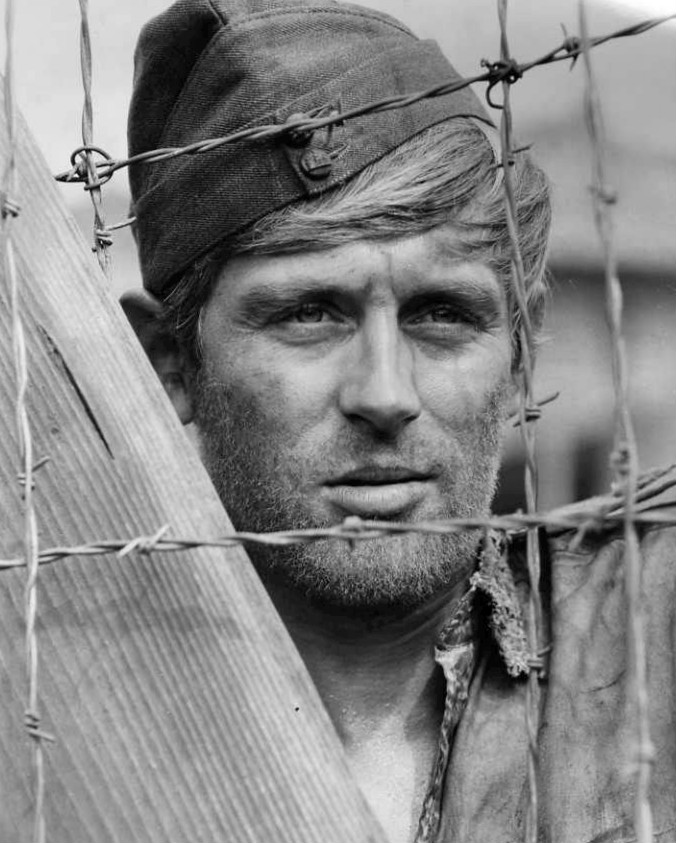
Actor and singer John Leyton had two top 10 entries this year, including "Johnny Remember Me", which spent four weeks at number-one.

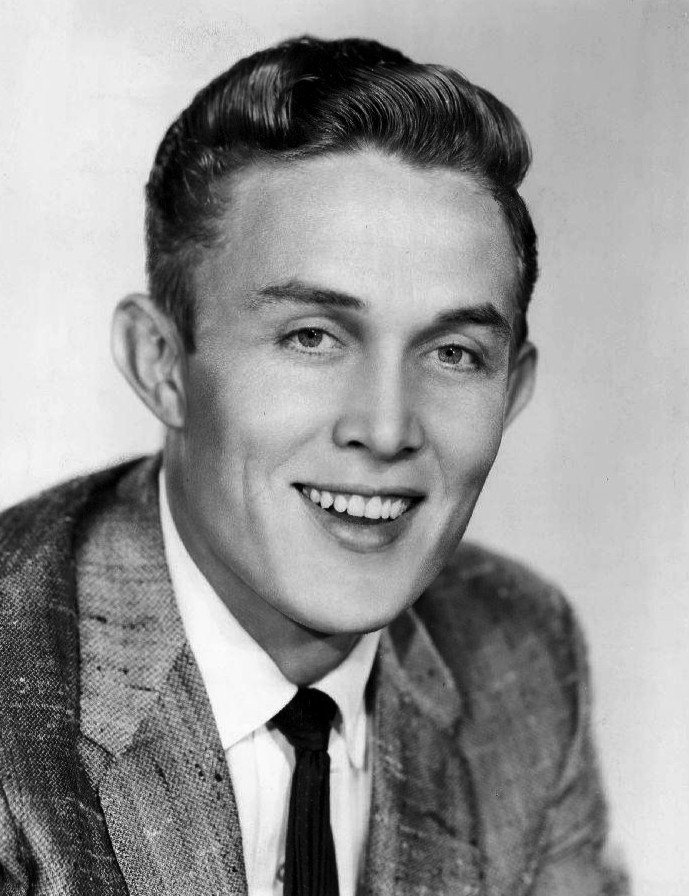
American country singer Jimmy Dean scored his only UK top 10 hit this year with "Big Bad John", which peaked at number two in November.

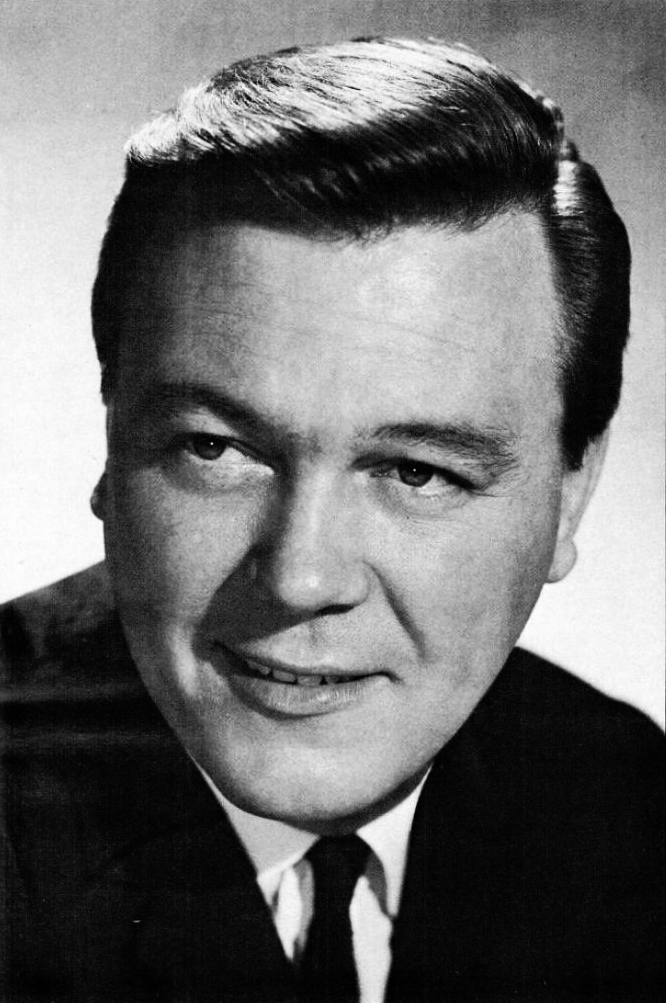
Matt Monro made the UK Singles Chart for the first time in 1961, achieving two top 10 singles, including his debut hit "Portrait of My Love", which peaked at number three in January.

The following table shows artists who achieved two or more top 10 entries in 1961, including singles that reached their peak in 1960 or 1962. The figures include both main artists and featured artists. The total number of weeks an artist spent in the top ten in 1961 is also shown.

Entries	Artist	Weeks	Singles
9	The Shadows ^{[R]}^{[S]}	50	"A Girl Like You", "FBI", "Gee Whizz It's You", "I Love You", "Kon-Tiki", "Man of Mystery"/"The Stranger", "The Frightened City", "The Savage", "Theme for a Dream"
6	Elvis Presley ^{[R]}	43	"Are You Lonesome Tonight?", "(Marie's the Name) His Latest Flame"/"Little Sister", "It's Now or Never", "Surrender", "Wild in the Country"/"I Feel Bad", "Wooden Heart"
5	Cliff Richard ^{[S]}	27	"A Girl Like You", "Gee Whizz It's You", "I Love You", "Theme for a Dream", "When the Girl in Your Arms is the Girl in Your Heart"
4	Bobby Vee	18	"How Many Tears", "More Than I Can Say"/"Stayin' In", "Rubber Ball", "Take Good Care of My Baby"
3	Mr. Acker Bilk ^{[T]}	7	"Buona Sera", "Stranger on the Shore", "That's My Home"
3	Adam Faith ^{[R]}	12	"Lonely Pup (In a Christmas Shop)", "The Time Has Come", "Who Am I?"/"This Is It"
3	Connie Francis ^{[R]}	8	"My Heart Has a Mind of Its Own", "Together", "Where the Boys Are"/"Baby Roo"
3	Helen Shapiro	29	"Don't Treat Me Like a Child", "Walkin' Back to Happiness", "You Don't Know"
3	Neil Sedaka	5	"Calendar Girl", "Little Devil", "Happy Birthday Sweet Sixteen"
3	Petula Clark	16	"My Friend, the Sea", "Romeo", "Sailor"
3	Shirley Bassey	14	"I'll Get By (As Long as I Have You)", "Reach For The Stars"/"Climb Ev'ry Mountain", "You'll Never Know"
2	Anthony Newley ^{[R]}	4	"And the Heavens Cried", "Strawberry Fair"
2	Billy Fury	20	"Halfway to Paradise", "Jealousy"
2	Bobby Darin	5	"Lazy River", "You Must Have Been a Beautiful Baby"
2	Clarence "Frogman" Henry	11	"But I Do", "You Always Hurt the One You Love"
2	Craig Douglas	7	"A Hundred Pounds of Clay", "Time"
2	Del Shannon	16	"Hats Off to Larry", "Runaway"
2	Duane Eddy	10	"Pepe", "Theme from Dixie"
2	Eden Kane	12	"Get Lost", "Well I Ask You"
2	The Everly Brothers	20	"Temptation", "Walk Right Back"/"Ebony Eyes"
2	John Leyton	15	"Johnny Remember Me", "Wild Wind"
2	Karl Denver	4	"Marcheta", "Mexicali Rose"
2	Lonnie Donegan	2	"Have a Drink on Me", "Michael, Row the Boat"/"Lumbered"
2	Matt Monro	11	"My Kind of Girl", "Portrait of My Love"
2	The Temperance Seven	16	"Pasadena", "You're Driving Me Crazy"

== Notes ==
- ^{a} "Midnight in Moscow" reached its peak of number two on 4 January 1962 (week ending).
- ^{b} "Man of Mystery"/"The Stranger" re-entered the top 10 at number 7 on 18 January 1961 (week ending) for 2 weeks.
- ^{c} "Goodness Gracious Me" re-entered the top 10 at number 7 on 11 January 1961 (week ending) for 3 weeks.
- ^{d} "Sailor" (Petula Clark version) re-entered the top 10 at number 10 on 29 March 1961 (week ending).
- ^{e} "FBI" re-entered the top 10 at number 7 on 12 April 1961 (week ending) for 3 weeks.
- ^{f} "Are You Sure?" was the United Kingdom's entry at the Eurovision Song Contest in 1961.
- ^{g} "Lazy River" re-entered the top 10 at number 5 on 19 April 1961 (week ending) for 3 weeks.
- ^{h} "Where the Boys Are"/"Baby Roo" re-entered the top 10 at number 5 on 3 May 1961 (week ending) for 2 weeks.
- ^{i} "Warpaint" re-entered the top 10 at number 9 on 31 May 1961 (week ending).
- ^{j} "Don't Treat Me Like a Child" re-entered the top 10 at number 7 on 7 June 1961 (week ending).
- ^{k} "Pasadena" re-entered the top 10 at number 9 on 6 September 1961 (week ending).
- ^{l} "Running Scared" re-entered the top 10 at number 10 on 26 July 1961 (week ending).
- ^{m} "You Don't Know" re-entered the top 10 at number 10 on 18 October 1961 (week ending).
- ^{n} "Time" re-entered the top 10 at number 9 on 16 August 1961 (week ending) for 3 weeks.
- ^{o} "Sucu Sucu" re-entered the top 10 at number 10 on 22 November 1961 (week ending).
- ^{p} "Hit the Road Jack" re-entered the top 10 at number 10 on 29 November 1961 (week ending).
- ^{q} "Stranger on the Shore" re-entered the top 10 at number 8 on 21 March 1962 (week ending) for 5 weeks and at number 10 on 9 May 1962 (week ending).
- ^{r} Figure includes single that peaked in 1960.
- ^{s} Figure includes single that first charted in 1961 but peaked in 1962.
- ^{t} Figure includes single that peaked in 1962.

== See also ==
- 1961 in British music
- List of number-one singles from the 1960s (UK)
