= Who Am I? (Adam Faith song) =

1961 single by Adam Faith

Single by Adam Faith
- B-side: "This Is It"
- Released: 3 February 1961
- Recorded: 22 January 1961
- Studio: EMI Studios, London
- Genre: Pop
- Length: 1:57
- Label: Parlophone
- Songwriter: Les Vandyke
- Producer: John Burgess

Adam Faith singles chronology
| "Lonely Pup (In a Christmas Shop)" (1960) | "Who Am I?" (1961) | "Easy Going Me" (1961) |

"Who Am I?" is a song written by Scottish bandleader Archie Alexander and released as a single by Adam Faith in February 1961. It was a top-ten hit on the UK charts.

== Background and reception ==
Following Faith's festive novelty song "Lonely Pup (In a Christmas Shop)", written by Archie Alexander, the songwriting of Faith's singles returned to Les Vandyke who had written Faith's four previous original songs ("What Do You Want?", "Poor Me", "Someone Else's Baby" and "How About That!"). Vandyke wrote both "Who Am I?" and the B-side "This Is It" and both sides were arranged by John Barry.

Reviewing for Disc, Don Nicholl described "Who Am I?" as "a very brisk romancer which lilts along brilliantly to a chorus and strings backing". Tony Barrow for the Liverpool Echo described "Who Am I?" as "a medium-tempo number involving several detached themes in a whole that is not particularly tuneful", but was very complimentary of the backing, writing "I am once more convinced that the secret of Faith's fame lies in the skill of John Barry. On this occasion he deserts the plucking effects and gives his orchestra bows with which they translate his leaping cascading orchestrations into the sounds which make "Who Am I?" and "This Is It" worth listening to". Maureen Cleave for The Evening Standard also agreed, writing that the "rendering of both [sides] is anaemic. He sounds frail and uninterested and his voice seems to sink into the welter of John Barry's brilliant backing".

Nevertheless, "Who Am I?" continued Faith's chart success peaking within the top ten of all the UK charts. On the Record Mirror and Record Retailer charts, "Who Am I?" and "This Is It" charted jointly as a pairing, peaking at numbers six and five on the respective charts. However, on the New Music Express chart, while "Who Am I?" peaked at number seven, "This Is It" charted for one week at number 23.

== Charts ==
| Chart (1961) | Peak position |
|---|---|
| Ireland (Evening Herald) | 9 |
| UK Disc Top 20 | 7 |
| UK Melody Maker Top 20 | 7 |
| UK New Musical Express Top 30 | 7 |
| UK Record Mirror Top 20 | 6 |
| UK Record Retailer Top 50 | 5 |
