= Poor me =

Poor me may refer to:

- "Poor Me", a 1960 song by Adam Faith
- "Poor Me", a 2017 song by Shania Twain from Now

== See also ==
- Victim mentality
- Victim playing
