= How About That! =

1960 single by Adam Faith

Single by Adam Faith
- B-side: "With Open Arms"
- Released: 9 September 1960
- Recorded: 14 August 1960
- Studio: EMI Studios, London
- Genre: Pop
- Length: 1:53
- Label: Parlophone
- Songwriter: Les Vandyke
- Producer: John Burgess

Adam Faith singles chronology
"When Johnny Comes Marching Home" (1960)	"How About That!" (1960)	"Lonely Pup (In a Christmas Shop)" (1960)

"How About That!" is a song written by Les Vandyke and released as a single by Adam Faith in September 1960. It was a top-ten hit on the UK charts.

== Background and release ==
Vandyke, who had written Faith's previous hits "What Do You Want?", "Poor Me" and "Someone Else's Baby", wrote "How About That!" as a joke after Faith's manager Eve Taylor jokingly suggested he write something with the title "How About That Then", one of her pet sayings. Arranger John Barry had predominantly used a pizzicato string arrangement on Faith's previous hits, but for "How About That!" decided to keep it to a minimum".

"How About That!" was released with the B-side "With Open Arms", which was written by Burt Bacharach and Hal David, and had been first released by Jane Morgan in 1959.

Don Nicholl for Disc wrong that the "tune and treatment are both born out of the lilter stable, though John Barry's accompaniment has altered slightly. He still uses plenty of strings but the plucking is not so dominant. The violins have a lot of ordinary – and pleasant – bow work to do here". The reviewer for the Sunderland Echo felt that whilst the backing was excellent, Faith's singing was disappointing, instead preferring "With Open Arms".

== Charts ==
Chart (1960)	Peak position
New Zealand (Lever Hit Parade)	2
UK Disc Top 20	3
UK Melody Maker Top 20	4
UK New Musical Express Top 30	3
UK Record Mirror Top 20	2
UK Record Retailer Top 50	4
