= Les Vandyke =

English songwriter (1931–2021)

- Also known as: Johnny Worth; Yannis Skordalides
- Born: John Worsley; 21 June 1931; Battersea, London, England
- Died: 6 August 2021 (aged 90) Consett, County Durham, England
- Genre: Popular music
- Occupations: Songwriter, singer
- Years active: 1951–2021

John Worsley (21 June 1931 – 6 August 2021), more widely known under the pseudonyms Les Vandyke and Johnny Worth, was an English popular music songwriter from the 1950s to the 1980s, who started his career as a singer.

As "Les Vandyke", he wrote the UK No. 1 hits "What Do You Want?", "Poor Me" (both for Adam Faith), and "Well I Ask You" (for Eden Kane). He also wrote hit singles billed as "John Worth", notably "Gonna Make You an Offer You Can't Refuse", a number 8 UK hit in 1973 for Jimmy Helms and "To Have and to Hold", a number 17 UK hit for Catherine Stock in 1986; and had notable industry success under his real name of John Worsley (especially with "Jack in the Box", a number 4 UK hit for Clodagh Rodgers in 1971). His songs were recorded by various artists, including Petula Clark, Vince Hill, Engelbert Humperdinck, Anthony Newley, Bobby Vee, Shirley Bassey, Herman's Hermits, Marty Wilde, Bobby Rydell, Cleo Laine, Barbra Streisand, Jimmy Justice, John Leyton, Freddie and the Dreamers, Sammy Davis Jr., and many more.

== Early life ==
When John was born, his father, a Greek Cypriot, was reportedly determined to christen his son as Yannis Paraskos Skordalides as a Greek Orthodox, but his Welsh mother insisted that he be named John Worsley and christened in the Church of England. The name "Worsley" was chosen by his father during the Wall Street crash of 1929 because he feared that he would not be able to get work with a Greek name. He changed it by deed poll, choosing the name "Worsley" by placing a pin at random on a map of England, which landed on Worsley in Greater Manchester. His father referred to his son as Yannis Skordalides throughout his life. In their book, Big Time: The Life of Adam Faith (2015), the authors David and Caroline Stafford assert that Worth was named Yani Panakos Paraskeva Skoradalides, but this is not supported by official records that confirm his registered name as John Worsley. In his youth, he was simply known as John Worsley.

== Background ==
After schooling, he began work as a draughtsman prior to his compulsory two years national service which he claimed were the happiest two years of his life. Returning to civilian life, he determined to become a singer, changing his name for the purpose to Johnny Worth.

He worked in pubs as a semi-professional until he managed to secure a television appearance. Watching, was the wife of well-known leader of the Oscar Rabin Band, and Worth was signed to the band, with whom he remained for five years, making a number of recordings for Oriole Records and Columbia Records. He also recorded for the Embassy Records label, which produced cheap covers of popular hits, usually sold through Woolworth's stores. He even recorded covers of his own hit songs. He then joined the Raindrops vocal quartet (together with Len Beadle, Beadle's wife Jackie Lee and Vince Hill), which appeared on the television programme Drumbeat and subsequent LP. It was on this show that he met Oscar-winning composer John Barry, with whom he was soon to work, and the singer Adam Faith.

Worsely had aspirations to be a songwriter, and though initial attempts had failed, he asked pianist Les Reed to arrange a demo of his song "What Do You Want?". Faith, record producer John Burgess and Barry liked it, and with Barry's arrangements, Faith took the song to number one in the UK Singles Chart in November 1959, within which it remained for 19 weeks. Worsely's concern was that as he was still signed to Oriole, he should adopt a pseudonym that was not "Johnny Worth". He combined Reed's first name with his own telephone exchange, to become Les Vandyke.

As Vandyke, Worsley provided Faith with his follow-up number one "Poor Me", in January 1960, and for the next two years penned a further six top ten British chart hits for Faith (all credited to Les Vandyke): "Someone Else's Baby"; "How About That!"; "Who Am I?"; "The Time Has Come"; "As You Like It" and "Don't That Beat All". Also in the guise of Vandyke, Worsley also wrote another chart-topper "Well I Ask You" for Eden Kane, a pseudonym for Richard, the eldest of the three Sarstedt brothers, as well as Kane's two follow up hits, "Get Lost" (reached No. 10 – September 1961) and "Forget Me Not" (No. 3 – January 1962).

At least two Vandyke songs were covered by well-known Australian artists: "Doin' The Mod" by Ronnie Burns's band the Flies (1965, first recorded by Vandyke with British band The Bambis, 1964) and "Dance Puppet Dance" by Little Pattie (also 1965, first recorded by Dave Duggan on Columbia in the UK, 1963), which reached number twelve in the Sydney-based pop charts.

Worsley — alternating between the names of Les Vandyke and Johnny (or John) Worth — also wrote music and songs for a number of low-budget movies during the 1960s and 1970s. These included What a Whopper (1961 as Johnny Worth); The Kitchen (1961); Mix Me a Person (1962, as Johnny Worth); Some People (1962 as Johnny Worth – lyricist); Johnny Cool (1963 as Les Vandyke); Psychomania (1973) and The Playbirds (1978 as John Worth); plus Saturday Night and Sunday Morning (1960). Although his own singing career was over, he recorded three songs for the score of the 1968 short film Les Bicyclettes de Belsize, including the title song, once again credited as Johnny Worth.

== Career ==
Barry Class, Trend Records period

In 1969, Vandyke aka Worsley and David Myers left Southern Music to join Barry Class' Trend record label. Together they wrote "Baby, I Couldn't See" for The Foundations. Worsley co-directed the recording session with Eric Allandale, the Foundations trombonist who was also employed by Trend as a producer. It was backed with "Penny Sir" and released on single, Pye 7N 17849 in 1969. It became a minor hit in Holland, making it on to the Dutch Tipparade chart, where it peaked at no. 8 on week three. New Zealand group, Quincy Conserve recorded their version of the song. For some reason, the song was credited to Macleod and Macaulay. It was also covered by Brazilian bands, The Pops and Os Selvagens, and included on both of their albums, Reação! and Os Selvagens that were released in 1970. Instrumental artist, Lafayette also recorded a version which appeared on his 1970 album, Apresenta Os Sucessos – Vol. 9. Some five decades later, the song was performed live by Alan Warner's Foundations in 2020.

A Class International advertisement appeared in the 15 November issue of Melody Maker. The agency represented The Groundhogs, Joyce Bold, Old Gold, Benedict Brown, High Tide, The Easybeats and Andy Fernbach. With "Baby, I Couldn't See" by The Foundations and "I Don't Want Her Anymore" by Consortium under their belts, they were looking for new talent. Instructions were given for artistes of the highest caliber to ring Myers or Worsley on a number given below.

Further activities

Beginning in the late 1960s Worsley phased out his use of the Les Vandyke pseudonym, and was generally credited under his real name of John Worsley (or sometimes as "John Worth") for his work as a writer/producer. He continued to work as a songwriter, and penned more hit records in the early 1970s. In 1971, he wrote the United Kingdom's Eurovision entry "Jack in the Box", performed by Clodagh Rodgers. It came fourth in the contest held in Dublin. For another example, he wrote and produced "Gonna Make You an Offer You Can't Refuse" a number 8 UK hit in 1973 for the American singer, and one-hit wonder, Jimmy Helms for Cube Records.

AllMusic journalist Bruce Eder states, "Vandyke is one of those rare talents in English pop music whose songwriting success crossed several genres and eras, from the end of the 1950s right into the 1970s".

During the 1970s, Worsley was one of the directors of the hotel and club venue, the Webbington Country Club, in the Mendips near Weston-super-Mare, Somerset.

In 1986, Worsley married Catherine Stock, sister of fellow songwriter, Mike Stock. Later that year, resurrecting the pseudonym "John Worth" as the credited writer/producer/arranger, he wrote, produced and arranged Stock's UK hit "To Have and To Hold", which reached number 17 in the UK Singles Chart.

== Death ==
Vandyke died in August 2021 at the age of 90, at his home in Consett, County Durham.

== Songwriting credits ==
Year	Title	Artist	UK Singles Chart
1960	"Johnny Rocco"	Marty Wilde	No. 30
1959	"What Do You Want?"	Adam Faith	No. 1
1959	"What Do You Want?"	Johnny Worth	-
1960	"What Do You Want?"	Bobby Vee	-
1960	"Poor Me"	Adam Faith	No. 1
1964	"Bee-Bom"	Sammy Davis, Jr.	-
1961	"Bee-Bom"	Anthony Newley	No. 12
1973	"Gonna Make You an Offer You Can't Refuse"	Jimmy Helms	No. 8
1962	"Ain't That Funny"	Jimmy Justice	No. 8
1961	"Well I Ask You"	Eden Kane	No. 1
1961	"All These Things"	Adam Faith	-
1962	"As You Like It"	Adam Faith	No. 5
1962	"Baby Take a Bow"	Adam Faith	No. 22
1962	"Butter Wouldn't Melt in Your Mouth"	Adam Faith	-
1962	"Don't That Beat All"	Adam Faith	No. 8
1961	"Don't You Know It"	Adam Faith	No. 12
1962	"Face to Face"	Adam Faith	-
1960	"Fare Thee Well My Pretty Maid"	Adam Faith	-
1963	"Forget Me Not"	Adam Faith	-
1962	"Going Up"	Adam Faith	-
1960	"How About That!"	Adam Faith	No. 4
1963	"Just Mention My Name"	Adam Faith	-
1962	"Knocking on Wood"	Adam Faith	-
1962	"Mix Me a Person"	Adam Faith	-
1961	"My Last Wish"	Adam Faith	-
1960	"Piper of Love"	Adam Faith	-
1961	"Second Time"	Adam Faith	-
1960	"Someone Else's Baby"	Adam Faith	No. 2
1962	"Swimming in Tears"	Adam Faith	-
1961	"This is It!"	Adam Faith	No. 5
1961	"The Time Has Come"	Adam Faith	No. 4
1963	"What Have I Got"	Adam Faith	-
1962	"While I'm Away"	Adam Faith	-
1961	"Who Am I?"	Adam Faith	No. 5
1961	"Wonderin'"	Adam Faith	-
1960	"Piper of Love"	Al Saxon	-
1962	"What a Mess"	The Allisons	-
1966	"Before The Good Thing (Ain't No Good No More)"	Antoine	-
1966	"Elephant's Lookin' at You"	Antoine	-
1964	"Come and Join Us"	Bob Leaper & The Prophets	-
1967	"Thanks To You"	Bobby Hanna	-
1963	"Hey Everybody"	Bobby Rydell	-
1963	"It's Time We Parted"	Bobby Rydell	-
1961	"Who Am I"	Bobby Stevens	-
1961	"Who Am I"	Bobby Vee	-
1962	"Forget Me Not"	Bobby Vee	-
1963	"Blue Girl"	The Bruisers	No. 31
1963	"Your Turn to Cry"	The Bruisers	-
1962	"Some People"	Carol Deene	No. 25
1962	"Instant Love"	Chance Gordon	-
1963	"Not Too Little Not Too Much"	Chris Sandford	No. 17
1963	"What Do Ya Say"	Chubby Checker	-
1966	"Time Marches On"	Corby & The Champagne	-
1960	"What Do You Want?"	Craig Douglas	-
1964	"Put Your Arms Around Me"	The Cresters	-
1960	"Boston Tea Party"	The Dallas Boys	-
1962	"Sad But True"	Danny Storm	-
1982	"Johnny Rocco"	Dave Stewart & Barbara Gaskin	-
1963	"Broken Hearts"	David MacBeth	-
1962	"A Brother Like You"	David MacBeth	-
1961	"Keep on Walking"	David MacBeth	-
1962	"Little Heart"	David MacBeth	-
1960	"Pigtails in Paris"	David MacBeth	-
1962	"It's All Happening Here"	Don Arrol	-
1962	"Forget Me Not"	Eden Kane	No. 3
1961	"Get Lost"	Eden Kane	No. 10
1962	"House to Let"	Eden Kane	-
1962	"Music for Strings"	Eden Kane	-
1963	"Someone Wants to Know"	Eden Kane	-
1963	"Sounds Funny to Me"	Eden Kane	-
1961	"Well I Ask You"	Eden Kane	-
1963	"What Have I Done to You"	Freddie and the Dreamers	-
1961	"Big Wheel"	Gerry Dorsey	-
1964	"I'm Gonna Spend My Christmas with a Dalek"	The Go-Go's	-
1966	"Dial My Number"	Herman's Hermits	-
1962	"Wishful Thinking"	Jackie Lynton	-
1960	"But No One Knows"	Jacquai Chan	-
1961	"Cry Wolf"	The Jags	-
1961	"The Hunch"	The Jags	-
1963	"I Know You"	Jess Conrad	-
1963	"Take Your Time"	Jess Conrad	-
1962	"Some People"	Jet Harris	-
1963	"Applejack"	Jet Harris and Tony Meehan	No. 4
1963	"Cupboard Love"	John Leyton	No. 22
1963	"I'll Cut Your Tail Off"	John Leyton	No. 36
1966	"After Yvonne"	John Worth Orchestra	-
1962	"All These Things"	Johnny Worth	-
1962	"You Know What I Mean"	Johnny Worth	-
1961	"Well I Ask You"	Kay Starr	-
1963	"Aladdin's Lamp"	Mark Wynter	-
1963	"Oh What a Guy"	Maureen Evans	-
1970	"Bouzouki"	Penny Lane	-
1962	"You Can Do It If You Try"	Peter Gordeno	-
1962	"Jumble Sale"	Petula Clark	-
1962	"Too Late"	Petula Clark	-
1959	"Italian Style"	The Raindrops	-
1962	"Don't That Beat All"	Rikki Henderson	-
1960	"One Thousand Nine Hundred and When"	Robb Storme	-
1967	"In My Love Mind"	Ronnie Jones	-
1962	"Hully Gully Slip 'n' Slide"	The Roulettes	-
1962	"La Bamba"	The Roulettes	-
1967	"All I Want is You"	Scott McKenzie	-
1963	"Don't Do That"	Shane Fenton	-
1961	"The 'Ooter Song"	Sid James	-
1962	"You Don't Have a Heart"	Sylvia Sands	-
1964	"Who Will It Be"	Tommy Scott	-
1962	"Butter Wouldn't Melt in Your Mouth"	Tommy Steele	-
1966	"Dial My Number"	Tony Field	-
1962	"Some People"	Valerie Mountain	-
1962	"Too Late"	Valerie Mountain	-
1962	"Yes, You Did"	Valerie Mountain	-
1963	"Day at the Seaside"	Vince Hill	-
1962	"The River's Run Dry"	Vince Hill	No. 41
1962	"There You Go"	Vince Hill	-
1961	"Dear Mary Brown"	The Viscounts	-
1964	"Doin' The Mod"	Vandyke & the Bambis	-
1965	"Doin' The Mod"	The Flies	-
1963	"Dance Puppet Dance"	Dave Duggan	-
1965	"Dance Puppet Dance"	Little Pattie	-
1960	"You Can Do It If You Try"	John Barry	-
1960	"Rum-Dee-Dum-Dee-Dah"	John Barry	-
1960	"My Last Wish"	John Barry	-
1961	"Boston Tea Party"	John Barry	-
1961	"Big Wheel"	John Barry	-
1961	"All These Things"	John Barry	-
1969	"Does Anybody Miss Me"	Shirley Bassey	-
1974	"Life Is a Wheel"	Cleo Laine	-
1970	"I'll Be Near You"	Jackie Trent	-
1970	"I Can Do It"	Barbra Streisand	-
1970	Melanie Cries Alone	Consortium	-
1971	"Jack in the Box"	Clodagh Rodgers	No. 4
1973	"Listen"	Carol Hawkins	-
1986	"To Have and To Hold"	Catherine Stock	No. 17
1969	"Baby, I Couldn't See"	The Foundations	-
