= Fings Ain't Wot They Used T'Be =

1959 musical comedy by Frank Norman and Lionel Bart

Fings Ain't Wot They Used T'be
- Original West End theatre programme
- Music: Lionel Bart
- Lyrics: Lionel Bart
- Book: Frank Norman
- Productions: 1960 West End

Fings Ain't Wot They Used T'be is a 1960 West End musical comedy about Cockney low-life characters in the 1950s, including spivs, prostitutes, teddy-boys and corrupt policemen. The work is more of a play with music than a conventional musical. The original play, by Frank Norman, who though born in Bristol lived his adult life in London, was intended to be a straight theatrical piece, but was supplemented with music and lyrics by Lionel Bart, who also grew up in London's East End.

== Production background ==
Norman initially wrote the piece as a play (with no music), but after Joan Littlewood read it, she asked Bart to write the music and lyrics. It was first performed by Theatre Workshop, produced and directed by Littlewood in February 1959 at their home, the Theatre Royal Stratford East. It subsequently played at the Garrick Theatre in London's West End, starting on 11 February 1960. It ran for 886 performances. The cast featured Maurice Kaufmann, Wallas Eaton, Miriam Karlin, James Booth, Barbara Windsor, Toni Palmer, Bryan Pringle, Ray Ausin, Tom Chatto, Paddy Joyce, Edward Caddick, Yootha Joyce, George Sewell, Michael O'Brien, Rick Morgan, Louis Adams, Neville Munroe, Mary Davies, Mary Sheen, Barbara Cording, Donald Wilson, James Dark and Tamba Allen.

It was a Cockney comedy, and the dialogue is in the Cockney dialect with much rhyming slang and thieves' cant. Some audiences found it difficult to understand, and a list of more than a dozen phrases with standard English translations was supplied in the programme.

The characters in the play were a selection of the low-life of London; a collection of gamblers, spivs, prostitutes, teddy boys and girls and some not-too-honest police. The memorable title song, "Fings Ain't Wot They Used T'be", was recorded by Max Bygraves, albeit with heavily bowdlerised lyrics. An original cast recording was made, and was later re-released by Hallmark Records (710032).

Reviews were mixed. It was later noted that "A few reviewers praised the production on the whole but found the script too thin, while others found it entertaining but not as good as the company's previous productions." The play won the Evening Standard Theatre Award for Best Musical (1960).

== Musical score ==
The original score and band parts for Fings Ain't Wot They Used T'be were lost sometime after its initial run, and so the only score which is now commercially available comprises previously published song-copy versions of some of the musical numbers, along with handwritten material for the remaining songs. There are no band parts, and "Meatface" is not present in any form.

For the production at the Guildford School of Acting in December 2012, Musical Director Steve Hill was asked to reconstruct the full score and band parts.

Whilst the show was playing at the Garrick Theatre, record producer Norman Newell collected British film, television, singing and stage stars to release an all star recording of the show. Tony Osborne provided musical direction, with John Barry and His Orchestra providing backing on two songs with Adam Faith. The cast included the author Lionel Bart himself, Alfie Bass, Adam Faith, Harry Fowler, Joan Heal, Sidney James, Alfred Marks, Marion Ryan, Tony Tanner, and the Williams Singers. The finale with the entire company also had vocals with "several celebrities present at the session" (according to the liner notes), including Glen Mason, Sean Connery, John Burgess, Pip Wedge, Jimmy Henney, Stella Tanner, and from the Garrick Theatre original cast, Miriam Karlin. The album was released in 1960 on the His Master's Voice label (CLP 1358).

== Reception ==
Reviewing a production in March 1959 Variety called it "a specialised piece of entertainment."

== Source ==
- Garrick Theatre Programme
