= Strawberry Fair (song) =

English folk song

Song
- Published: 1891
- Genre: Folk
- Songwriter: Traditional

Strawberry Fair is an English folk song (Roud Folk Song Index 173).

The song was collected by H. Fleetwood Sheppard in Broadstone, Devon, in 1891. The text may have been re-written by Sabine Baring Gould and Fleetwood Sheppard.

== Lyrics ==
As I was going to Strawberry Fair,
Singing, singing, Butter-cups and Daisies
I met a maiden taking her ware,
Fol-de-dee!
Her eyes were blue and golden her hair,
As she went on to Strawberry Fair,
Ri-fol, Ri-fol, Tol-de-riddle-li-do,
Ri-fol, Ri-fol, Tol-de-riddle-dee.

"Kind Sir, pray pick of my basket!" she said,
Singing, singing, Butter-cups and Daisies
"My cherries ripe, or my roses red,
Fol-de-dee!
My strawberries sweet, I can of them spare,
As I go on to Strawberry Fair."
Ri-fol, Ri-fol, Tol-de-riddle-li-do,
Ri-fol, Ri-fol, Tol-de-riddle-dee.

"Your cherries soon will be wasted away;"
Singing, singing, Butter-cups and Daisies
"Your roses wither'd and never stay,
Fol-de-dee.
'Tis not to seek such perishing ware
That I am tramping to Strawberry Fair."
Ri-fol, Ri-fol, Tol-de-riddle-li-do,
Ri-fol, Ri-fol, Tol-de-riddle-dee.

I want to purchase a generous heart,
Singing, singing, Butter-cups and Daisies
A tongue that neither is nimble or tart.
Tol-de-dee!
An honest mind, but such trifles are rare
I doubt if they're found at Strawberry Fair.
Ri-fol, Ri-fol, Tol-de-riddle-li-do,
Ri-fol, Ri-fol, Tol-de-riddle-dee.

The price I offer, my sweet pretty maid
Singing, singing, Butter-cups and Daisies
A ring of gold on your finger displayed,
Tol-de-dee!
So come- make over to me your ware,
In church today at Strawberry Fair.
Ri-fol, Ri-fol, Tol-de-riddle-li-do,
Ri-fol, Ri-fol, Tol-de-riddle-dee.

== Versions ==
- A version was recorded by Anthony Newley (Decca F11295, 1960, "Strawberry Fair / A Boy Without a Girl") which reached number 3 in the UK Singles Chart. The beginning is the same as the traditional version, but then the rest is altered for humorous effect, for example: I told her straight / I want a girl with a generous heart / (Singing, singing buttercups and oojahs) / Without a tongue that is wicked or smart / (Foldadee) / And an honest mind but these are rare / I doubt If I'll find 'em at this crummy old fair / (Rifle, Rifle, Tolderiddleay)". In the same year, Newley also performed a shortened version of this arrangement in episode 5 of his surreal comedy show The Strange World of Gurney Slade.
- In a 1968 episode of Round the Horne, Rambling Syd Rumpo (played by Kenneth Williams) parodied this song as "Goosenadgers Fair" ("As I was going to Goosenadgers Fair, / Singing, singing, loomers on my posset… / Singing, singing, nadger Julie Felix / Singing, singing, riddle Simon Dee...")
