= Someone Else's Baby =

1960 single by Adam Faith

Single by Adam Faith
- B-side: "Big Time"
- Released: 8 April 1960
- Recorded: March 1960
- Studio: EMI Studios, London
- Genre: Pop
- Length: 2:03
- Label: Parlophone
- Songwriters: Les Vandyke; Perry Ford
- Producer: John Burgess

Adam Faith singles chronology
"Poor Me" (1960)	"Someone Else's Baby" (1960)	"When Johnny Comes Marching Home" (1960)

"Someone Else's Baby" is a song written by Les Vandyke and Perry Ford and released as a single by Adam Faith in April 1960. It peaked at number two in the UK charts.

== Background and release ==
"Someone Else's Baby" started off as a melody written by Perry Ford, who gave a manuscript of it titled "The Masterpiece" to Mills Music publisher Freddie Poser. Vandyke, who had written Faith's previous hits "What Do You Want?" and "Poor Me", then took this melody, worked on it a little and added lyrics, turning the song into "Someone Else's Baby".

"Someone Else's Baby" followed the same formula as Faith's previous two hits, featuring a similar arrangement by John Barry and exaggerated pronunciation, with biographers David and Caroline Stafford writing that "there is no doubt that the pronunciation of "baby" in 'Somebody Else's Baby' is deliberate self-parody". It was released as a single with the B-side "Big Time", written by Lionel Bart and taken from the studio cast recording of the musicial Fings Ain't Wot They Used T'Be which Faith performed in, and showcased his versatility singing a big band musical number.

Don Nicholl for Disc rated it the best thing he'd done so far, describing the song as having "a lilting tune with an easy to hold lyric and a light-as-souffle accompaniment". Whilst the single was tipped to continue Faith streak at the top of the charts, it peaked at number two in the UK charts, held off the top by the Everly Brothers' "Cathy's Clown". On the New Musical Express chart, "Big Time" also charted for one week, peaking at number 27.

A week after the release of "Someone Else's Baby", Faith made his debut performing live on the ATV show Tonight at the London Palladium singing the song along with "What Do You Want?", "Poor Me" and "Big Time".

== Charts ==
Chart (1960)	Peak position
Australia (Kent Music Report)	84
New Zealand (Lever Hit Parade)	4
UK Disc Top 20	2
UK Melody Maker Top 20	2
UK New Musical Express Top 30	2
UK Record Mirror Top 20	2
UK Record Retailer Top 50	2
