= Lonely Pup (In a Christmas Shop) =

1960 single by Adam Faith

- Cover of the sheet music

Single by Adam Faith
- B-side: "Greenfinger"
- Released: 11 November 1960
- Recorded: 30 October 1960
- Studio: EMI Studios, London
- Genre: Pop
- Length: 1:47
- Label: Parlophone
- Songwriter: Archie Alexander
- Producer: John Burgess

Adam Faith singles chronology
"How About That!" (1960)	"Lonely Pup (In a Christmas Shop)" (1960)	"Who Am I?" (1961)

"Lonely Pup (In a Christmas Shop)" is a novelty song written by Scottish bandleader Archie Alexander and released as a single by Adam Faith in November 1960. It was a top-ten hit on the UK charts.

== Background and reception ==
Faith was set to perform in the pantomime Dick Whittington in December 1960 and to take advantage of this, Faith's management felt it would be worth releasing a Christmas song which he could sing in the pantomime. Archie Alexander had brought "Lonely Pup (In a Christmas Shop)" to Mills Music publisher Freddie Poser, who liked the song and accepted it with Faith in mind. Faith's manager Eve Taylor believed "Lonely Pup (In a Christmas Shop)" was perfect for Faith but he disagreed. Taylor was insistent so it was recorded. She also had an idea for promoting the song: after Faith sang the song in Dick Whittington, he would give a child in the audience an actual puppy to keep. However, the idea was vetoed by the theatre. Taylor was able to implement her idea when Faith appeared on The Alma Cogan Show at the end of November. He sang the song, before giving Alma Cogan a Cocker Spaniel puppy.

The reviewer in The Redditch Indicator wrote that "Lonely Pup (In a Christmas Shop)" "looks likely to be a big-seller. John Barry provides his usual scintillating string-backing and blend with it familiar Christmas sounds. A children's chorus helps to give the song added attraction". The reviewer in The Chester Chronicle praised "an imaginative and catchy backing" but criticised that "the lyrics would be scoffed at in the nursery".

== Charts ==
Chart (1960–61)	Peak position
Ireland (Evening Herald)	9
UK Disc Top 20	3
UK Melody Maker Top 20	4
UK New Musical Express Top 30	5
UK Record Mirror Top 20	5
UK Record Retailer Top 50	4
