= What Do You Want? =

1959 single by Adam Faith

Single by Adam Faith
- B-side: "From Now Until Forever"
- Released: 24 October 1959
- Recorded: 25 September 1959
- Studio: EMI Studios, London
- Genre: Pop
- Length: 1:38
- Label: Parlophone
- Songwriter: Les Vandyke
- Producer: John Burgess

Adam Faith singles chronology
"Ah, Poor Little Baby!" (1959)	"What Do You Want?" (1959)	"Poor Me" (1960)

"What Do You Want?" is a song written by Les Vandyke and released as a single by Adam Faith in October 1959. It topped the charts in the UK and is estimated to have had over 820,000 sales. Running a total of 98 seconds, it is the shortest song yet to reach number one in the UK charts.

== Background ==
In 1957, Faith was working as a film cutter as well as singing as part of a skiffle group called the Worried Men. The group became the resident band at the 2i's Coffee Bar in Soho, and in November 1957 appeared on the BBC Television live music programme Six-Five Special. The programme's producer, Jack Good, was impressed by Faith and arranged a solo recording contract for Faith with His Master's Voice. Faith released two singles on the label, "(Got a) Heartsick Feeling" in January 1958 and a cover of Jerry Lee Lewis' "High School Confidential" in November; however, neither found any success. Despite this, Good gave Faith a part on Six-Five Special alongside the John Barry Seven, though this did not last long as the programme ended after four performances. Following this, Faith went back to work, getting a job at Danziger Studios, before getting a role a couple of months later as an assistant editor at National Studios.

In March 1959, Faith was contacted by John Barry whose band had been hired to appear on a new BBC music programme Drumbeat in April. The producer, Stewart Morris, wanted the programme to develop its own star, so Barry contacted Faith to invite him to audition. Faith landed an initial contract for three shows, however this was later extended to the full 22 week run of the programme. Faith released his third single, "Ah, Poor Pretty Baby!", for Top Rank in June 1959, but this also failed to find any success. However, Faith's success on Drumbeat led to him getting a record contract with Parlophone.

== Writing and recording ==
Johnny Worth, born John Worsley, performed as part of the vocal quartet the Raindrops who appeared on Drumbeat. He was also an aspiring songwriter and asked Les Reed, the pianist in the John Barry Seven, to create a demo of "What Do You Want?" for Johnny Kidd and the Pirates. However, according to Reed "I played it with a rock-type rhythm, but Johnny hated the song". Worth also struck up a friendship with Faith on Drumbeat who asked him if he had any suitable material to record. When Worth and Reed played the song to Faith and Barry, they "changed the whole treatment of the song into a Buddy Holly, string-type treatment" which was well received by Faith and Barry. Worth was under contract with Oriole Records and so to avoid any conflict adopted another pseudonym, Les Vandyke, for songwriting credits.

"What Do You Want" was recorded at EMI Studios (later renamed Abbey Road Studios) on 25 September 1959. Norman Newell was supposed to produce the session but was busy so instead his assistant producer John Burgess produced it. The notable pizzicato string arrangement was performed by fiddle players Sid Margo, Bernard Monshin, Alec Firm and Charlie Katz, with the song also featuring Vic Flick on guitar and Les Reed on piano. Speaking about the recording, Burgess has said that "Adam's voice could never soar or compete with bass, drums and twang ... everything had to be feathery light".

The weekend before the recording session, Faith shared a car to Oxford with another of his friends from Drumbeat, pianist Roy Young. Faith sang "What Do You Want" to Young who was appalled by the lack of style with which Faith sang the song, with Faith saying that "he coached me all the way to Oxford and by the time we got there, 'baby' had turned into 'bay-beh'". When Newell heard the recording afterwards he was horrified, hating the arrangement and Adam's enunciation.

== Release ==
"What Do You Want?" was released as a single on 24 October 1959 and was not immediately successful. It received positive reviews: Don Nicholl for Disc wrote "a marriage of bouncy pop and hiccoughing beat, which is both likeable and amusing", and Jack Good in his column for the same magazine was gushing about the song, praising Barry's arrangement and Faith's singing and tipping it to be a number one in both the UK and US. Initially, sales were around 3,000 copies a day but this increased to 7,500 copies on 20 November after "What Do You Want?" was played and voted a hit on the BBC's Juke Box Jury and after Faith's appearance on Good's Boy Meets Girls. On Saturday, 21 November, Faith appeared on the BBC Light Programme radio show Saturday Club to sing the song and on Monday, 23 November, 42,500 copies were sold which was more than any other British artist had sold in a day. At its peak, the single was selling 50,000 copies per day.

On the New Musical Express chart (used as the canonical official chart for the period), "What Do You Want?" topped the chart for three weeks in December 1959 and spending a total of 19 weeks on the chart. For its final week at number one, "What Do You Want" shared its position with "What Do You Want to Make Those Eyes at Me For?" by Emile Ford & the Checkmates. On the Record Mirror chart, the single topped the chart for five weeks, the Melody Maker chart for three weeks, and the Disc chart for two weeks.

== Charts ==
Chart (1959–60)	Peak position
Australia (Kent Music Report)	22
Ireland (Evening Herald)	1
UK Disc Top 20	1
UK Melody Maker Top 20	1
UK New Musical Express Top 30	1
UK Record Mirror Top 20	1

== Cover versions ==
- In January 1960, American singer Bobby Vee released a cover of "What Do You Want?" as his second single. It peaked at number 93 on the Billboard Hot 100.
