= Poor Me =

1960 single by Adam Faith

Single by Adam Faith
- B-side: "The Reason"
- Released: 15 January 1960
- Recorded: December 1959
- Studio: EMI Studios, London
- Genre: Pop
- Length: 1:46
- Label: Parlophone
- Songwriter: Les Vandyke
- Producer: John Burgess

Adam Faith singles chronology
"What Do You Want?" (1959)	"Poor Me" (1960)	"Someone Else's Baby" (1960)

"Poor Me" is a song written by Les Vandyke and released as a single by Adam Faith in January 1960. It topped the charts in the UK, becoming Faith's second and final single to do so.

== Background and release ==
For the follow up to the number-one single "What Do You Want?", the same songwriting and production team was kept with Faith's management hoping they would come up with another successful song. Written by Les Vandyke, an early version of the song was titled "Poor Man" and had been rejected by several music publishers. Also following the same formula as "What Do You Want?", arranger John Barry included a pizzicato string arrangement on "Poor Me". Notably, a motif found throughout the song has some similarities to the "James Bond Theme", which was arranged and recorded by Barry in 1962 (though this motif can potentially be traced back to Artie Shaw's 1938 recording "Nightmare").

"Poor Me" was released on 15 January 1960 when "What Do You Want?" was still high in the charts. Reviews were split about the song. Don Nicholl for Disc felt that it was "a much better recording" than "What Do You Want?", and also praised the string backing. However, the reviewer for the Pontypridd Observer felt it "has not got the same strong appeal" and the reviewer for The Crewe Chronicle wrote that it "makes no impression on first hearing but a dealer assures me it is a number which will "grow on" the public". It was also felt by some that Faith and Barry contrived a backing and singing style that leaned too heavily on the style of Buddy Holly, and "Poor Me" was likened to his hit single, "Heartbeat".

Nevertheless, "Poor Me" went on to continue the success of "What Do You Want?". Before the first official UK singles chart compiled by the BMRB in 1969, there was no universally accepted chart. The New Musical Express chart is nowadays seen as the accepted source between its inception in 1952 up until 10 March 1960 when Record Retailer started compiling their own chart. This chart is then used as the accepted source up until 1969. "Poor Me" topped the New Musical Express chart for two weeks, with the first during the week ending 9 March. The following week, on the first chart for Record Retailer, "Poor Me" was number one, hence canonically, "Poor Me" is seen as having topped the UK singles chart for two weeks. It also topped the Disc, Melody Maker and Record Mirror charts for one week.

== Charts ==
Chart (1960)	Peak position
Ireland (Evening Herald)	3
UK Disc Top 20	1
UK Melody Maker Top 20	1
UK New Musical Express Top 30	1
UK Record Mirror Top 20	1
UK Record Retailer Top 50	1
