= Adam Faith =

English singer, actor and financial journalist (1940–2003)

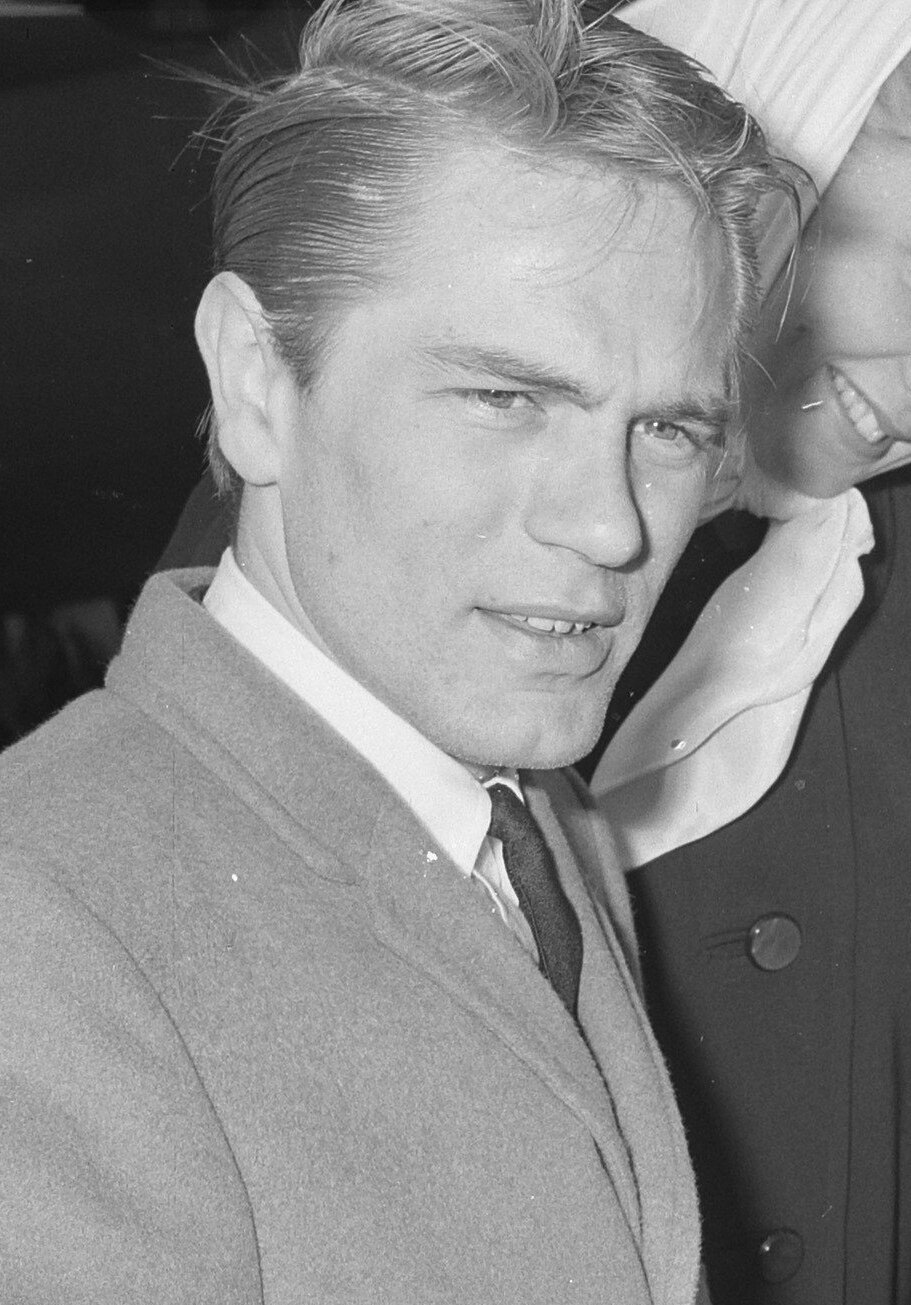
- Faith in 1963

Background information
- Also known as: Terry Nelhams
- Born: Terence Nelhams Wright; 23 June 1940; Acton, Middlesex, England
- Died: 8 March 2003 (aged 62) Stoke-on-Trent, Staffordshire, England
- Genres: Pop; rock and roll; beat
- Occupations: Musician; actor; journalist
- Instrument: Vocals
- Years active: 1957–2003
- Labels: Parlophone; Top Rank International; His Master's Voice; Warner
- Formerly of: The Worried Men (1957); The Roulettes

Terence Nelhams Wright (23 June 1940 – 8 March 2003), known professionally as Adam Faith, was an English singer, actor, and financial journalist. As a British rock and roll teen idol, he scored consecutive No. 1 hits on the UK singles chart with "What Do You Want?" (1959) and "Poor Me" (1960). He became the first UK artist to lodge his initial seven hits in the top 5, and was ultimately one of the most charted acts of the 1960s. He was also one of the first UK acts to record original songs regularly.

Faith also maintained an acting career, appearing as Dave in the teen exploitation film Beat Girl (1960), the eponymous lead in the ITV television series Budgie (1971–1972) and Frank Carver in the BBC comedy drama Love Hurts (1992–1994).

== Early life and education ==
Terence Nelhams Wright was born on 23 June 1940 at 4, East Churchfield Road, Acton, Middlesex (now included in London), England, son of coach driver Alfred Richard Nelhams and cleaner Ellen May (née Burridge), formerly wife of Cecil G. Wright, from whom she was separated, but not divorced. Unmarried at the births of all their children, his parents were married in 1953.

Known as Terry Nelhams, he was unaware his name was Terence Nelhams Wright until he applied for a passport and obtained his birth certificate. The third in a family of five children, Nelhams grew up in a council house in a working class area of London, where he attended John Perryn Junior School. He had his first job at 12, delivering and selling newspapers part-time while still at school. His first full-time job was odd-job boy for a silk screen printer.

== Music career ==
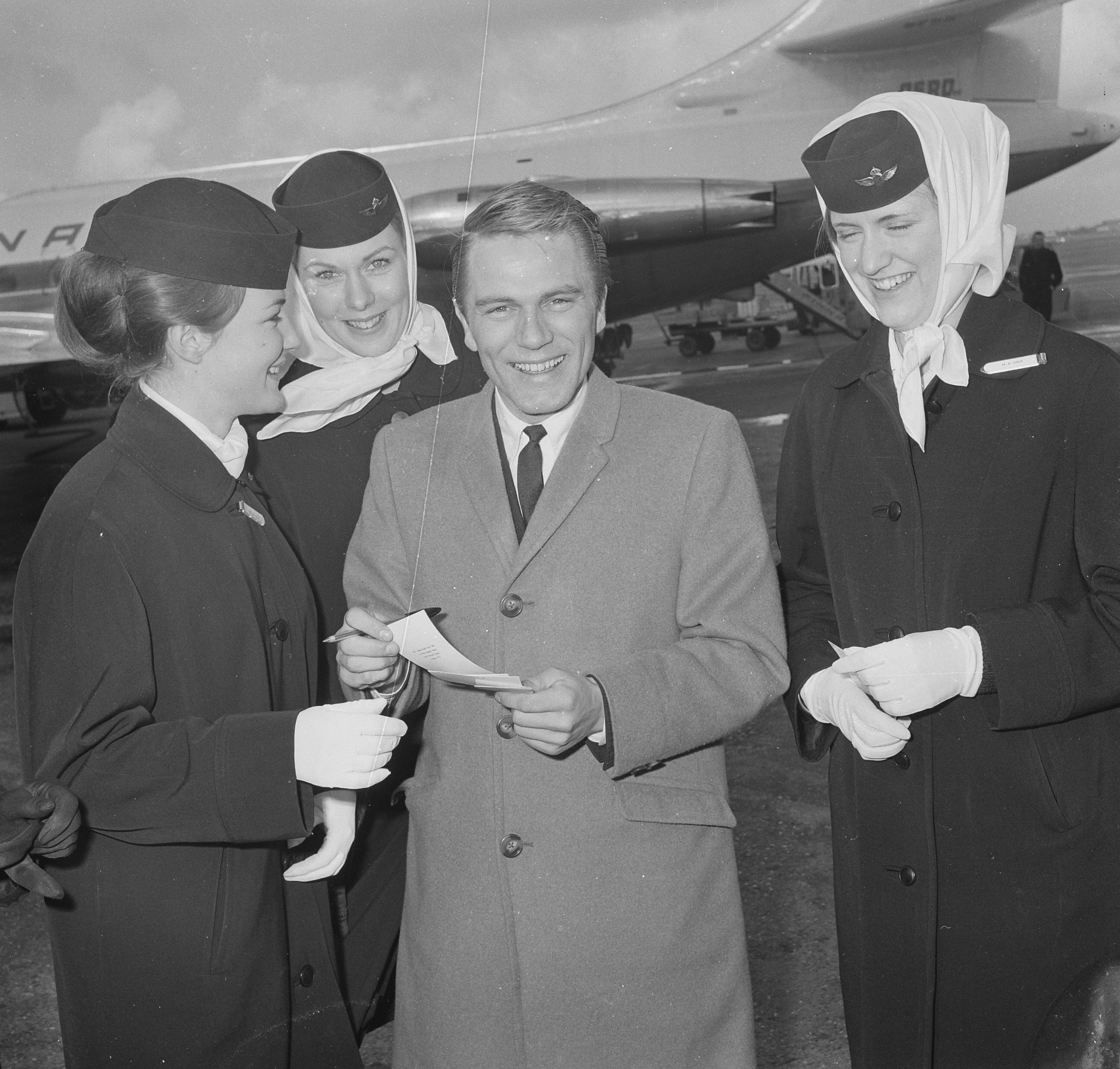
Faith at Amsterdam Schiphol Airport, 4 April 1963.

Faith began his musical career in 1957, while working as a film cutter in London in the hope of becoming an actor, singing with and managing a skiffle group, the Worried Men. The group played in Soho coffee bars after work, and became the resident band at the 2i's Coffee Bar, where they appeared on the BBC Television live music programme Six-Five Special. The producer, Jack Good, was impressed by the singer and arranged a solo recording contract with His Master's Voice under the name Adam Faith. According to Faith's obituary in The Guardian, Good showed him a book of names, and the aspiring singer picked "Adam" from the boys' list, and "Faith" from the girls' list.

His debut record "(Got a) Heartsick Feeling" and "Brother Heartache and Sister Tears", in January 1958, failed to make the charts. Good gave him a part in the stage show of Six-Five Special, along with the John Barry Seven but the show folded after four performances. His second release later that year was a cover of Jerry Lee Lewis's "High School Confidential", backed with the Burt Bacharach and Hal David penned "Country Music Holiday" but this also failed.

Faith returned to work as a film cutter at National Studios at Elstree until March 1959, when Barry invited him to audition for a BBC TV rock and roll show, Drumbeat. The producer, Stewart Morris, gave him a contract for three shows, extended to the full 22-week run. His contract with His Master's Voice had ended, and he sang one track, "I Vibrate", on a six-track EP released by the Fontana record label. Barry's manager, Eve Taylor, got him a contract with Top Rank, but his only record there, "Ah, Poor Little Baby"/"Runk Bunk"

Faith's success on Drumbeat enabled another recording contract, with Parlophone. His next record in 1959, "What Do You Want?", written by Les Vandyke and produced by Barry and John Burgess, received good reviews in the NME and other papers, as well as being voted a hit on Juke Box Jury; This became his first number one hit in the UK Singles Chart, and his pronunciation of the word 'baby' as 'bay-beh' became a catchphrase.

"What Do You Want?" stayed in the charts for 19 weeks, was the first number one hit for Parlophone, Faith being the only pop act on the label. With his next two single releases, "Poor Me" went to number 1 in the UK, and "Someone Else's Baby" reached number 2, Faith had established himself as a prominent rival to Cliff Richard in British popular music.

Faith's next release was a double A-side single, "Made You"/"When Johnny Comes Marching Home", which made the top ten, despite a BBC ban for "Made You" for 'a lewd and salacious lyric'. His 1960 novelty record "Lonely Pup (In a Christmas Shop)", to coincide with his Christmas pantomime, gained a silver disc. His début album Adam was released on 4 November 1960 to critical acclaim for the inventiveness of Barry's arrangements and Faith's own performances. The material ranged from standards such as "Summertime", "Hit the Road to Dreamland" and "Singin' in the Rain" to more contemporary songs, such as Doc Pomus and Mort Shuman's "I'm a Man", Johnny Worth's "Fare Thee Well My Pretty Maid", and Howard Guyton's "Wonderful Time".

In December 1960, he became the first pop artist to appear on the TV interview series Face to Face with John Freeman. Faith made six further albums and 35 singles, with a total of 24 chart entries, of which 11 made the UK top ten, including his two number ones. Ten of the eleven singles that made the top ten also made the top 5. Faith managed to lodge twenty consecutive single releases on the UK Singles Chart, starting with "What Do You Want?" in November 1959, and culminating with "I Love Being in Love with You" in mid-1964.

Faith's last top ten hit in the UK (in October 1963) was "The First Time", (UK No. 5), which was also his first single with his backing group in 1963 and 1964, the Roulettes. He charted again with is 1974 single "I Survived".

Benefiting from the enthusiasm of American audiences for all artists British at the height of the British Invasion in 1964–1965, Faith managed to register one single in the top 40 of the US Billboard Hot 100, "It's Alright" (which was not released as a single in his native UK). Faith's teen pop became less popular in the mid-1960s in competition with the Beatles. His final top-40 single in the UK was "Someone's Taken Maria Away" in 1965.

During the 1970s, Faith went into music management, managing Leo Sayer among others. Faith negotiated an advance for his own comeback album with Warner Bros. Records, using half of it to record the album I Survive (which failed to chart) and the other half to finance Sayer. Faith and his former drummer David Courtney co-produced Sayer's initial hits "The Show Must Go On" and "One Man Band". Sayer later said in an interview with British newspaper The Daily Telegraph that "[Faith] handled everything for me, but although he was a very good mentor, he was less trustworthy with my money. In the end, Adam Faith made more out of Leo Sayer than I did." Faith also co-produced Roger Daltrey's first solo album Daltrey which included the hit single "Giving It All Away" penned by Sayer.

== Film, television, and theatre career ==
While pursuing his musical career, Faith appeared in supporting roles in films such as Beat Girl (1960) and Never Let Go (1960), and television dramas such as the Rediffusion/ITV series No Hiding Place. In 1961, Faith starred in What a Whopper, supported by Sid James, Spike Milligan, Wilfrid Brambell, Carole Lesley and others well known at the time. A comedy about a writer staging a fake sighting of the Loch Ness Monster, it was written by Terry Nation, and had music by John Barry; Faith sang the title song and "The Time Has Come". He also made a last-minute guest appearance in What a Carve Up! (1961) with Sid James and Kenneth Connor.

In 1962, Faith co-starred opposite Donald Sinden and Anne Baxter in the film Mix Me a Person, playing a working-class youth falsely accused of murder. The thriller was rated X-certificate (the modern equivalent would be a UK 18-certificate) by the British Board of Film Censors. Following Faith's 1968 departure from his record label EMI, he concentrated on acting, particularly repertory theatre. After a number of small parts, he was given a more substantial role in the play Night Must Fall, playing opposite Dame Sybil Thorndike. In autumn 1969, he took the lead in a touring production of Billy Liar. Faith starred as the eponymous hero in the early 1970s television series Budgie (LWT/ITV), about an ex-convict.

Faith's acting career declined after a 1973 motor car accident in which he almost lost a leg. He restarted with a role in Stardust (1974), as the manipulative manager of rock star David Essex, for which he was nominated for a BAFTA award. Despite this success, he remained reluctant to act for some years, and turned back to music-related ventures.

In 1980, he starred with Roger Daltrey in McVicar, and again played a rock band manager in Foxes, starring Jodie Foster as his daughter. Faith played the role of James Crane in the 1985 TV movie Minder on the Orient Express – part of the Minder franchise. From 1992 to 1994, he appeared in another TV series, Love Hurts, starring with Zoë Wanamaker. In 2002, he appeared in the BBC series The House That Jack Built. In 2003, he appeared in an episode of Murder in Mind.

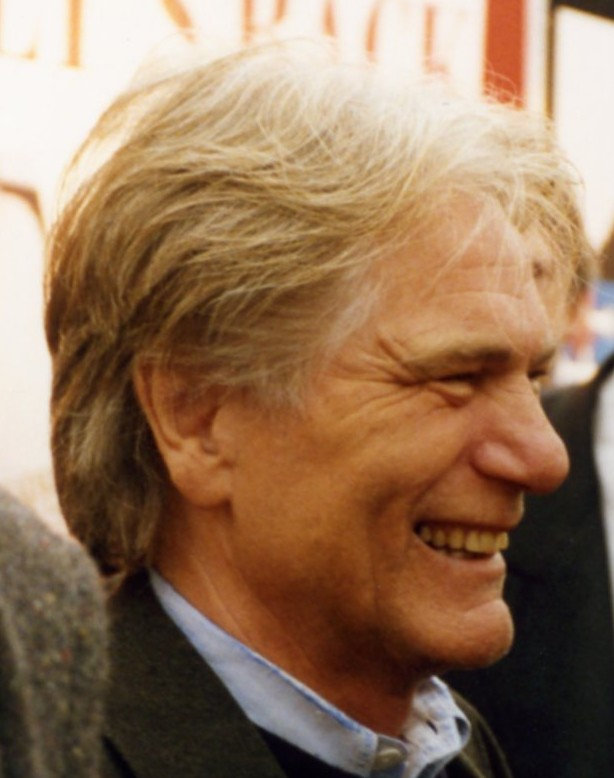
Faith in later years

== Later years ==
Faith married Jackie Irving in 1967 and they had one daughter, Katya Faith, who became a television producer. By the 1980s, Faith had become an investor and financial adviser. In 1986, he was hired as a financial journalist by the Daily Mail and its sister paper The Mail on Sunday. Faith and business partner, Paul Killik, were the principal investors behind failed UK television station Money Channel. When the channel closed in June 2002, Faith was declared bankrupt, owing a reported £32 million. English film director and producer Michael Winner stated that Faith was his investment adviser, leading to significant losses on two different investments. Faith specifically blamed the bankruptcy on the collapse of the Money Channel, "to which I devoted some seven years of my life ... as a result of its demise my personal financial circumstances became severely affected".

== Death ==
Faith had heart surgery in 1986. On 7 March 2003, he became ill after his evening stage performance in the touring production of Love and Marriage at Stoke-on-Trent. Faith died, aged 62, of a heart attack early the next morning, 8 March 2003, at North Staffordshire Hospital in Hartshill. It was reported after his death that the married star's 22-year-old mistress had been in his hotel room the night he was taken ill.

== Discography ==
- Adam (1960)
- Adam Faith (1962)
- From Adam with Love (1963)
- For You (1963)
- On the Move (1964)
- I Survive (1974)
- Midnight Postcards (1993)

== Filmography ==
=== Film ===
| Year | Title | Role | Director |
|---|---|---|---|
| 1960 | Never Let Go | Tommy Towers | John Guillermin |
| 1960 | Beat Girl (aka Wild for Kicks) | Dave | Edmond T. Gréville |
| 1961 | What a Carve Up | Linda's boyfriend (uncredited cameo) | Pat Jackson (director) |
| 1961 | What a Whopper | Tony | Gilbert Gunn |
| 1962 | Mix Me a Person | Harry Jukes | Leslie Norman |
| 1974 | Stardust | Mike | Michael Apted |
| 1979 | Yesterday's Hero | Jake | Neil Leifer |
| 1980 | Foxes | Bryan | Adrian Lyne |
| 1980 | McVicar | Walter Probyn | Tom Clegg |

=== Television ===
| Year | Title | Role | Notes |
|---|---|---|---|
| 1959 | No Hiding Place | Vince | Episode: 1.03 "Wheels of Fury" |
| 1966 | Seven Deadly Sins | Watcher | Episode: 1.05 "In the Night" |
| 1971–1972 | Budgie | Ronald "Budgie" Bird | 26 episodes |
| 1977 | McCloud | Inspector Craig | Episode: 7.05 "London Bridges" |
| 1984 | Just Another Little Blues Song | Frank | Television film |
| 1985 | Minder | James Crane | Episode: 6.07 "Minder on the Orient Express" |
| 1992–1994 | Love Hurts | Frank Carver | 30 episodes |
| 2002 | The House That Jack Built | Jack Squire | 6 episodes |
| 2003 | Murder in Mind | Terry Cameron | Episode: 3.05 "Contract" |
