= List of UK top-ten singles in 1963 =

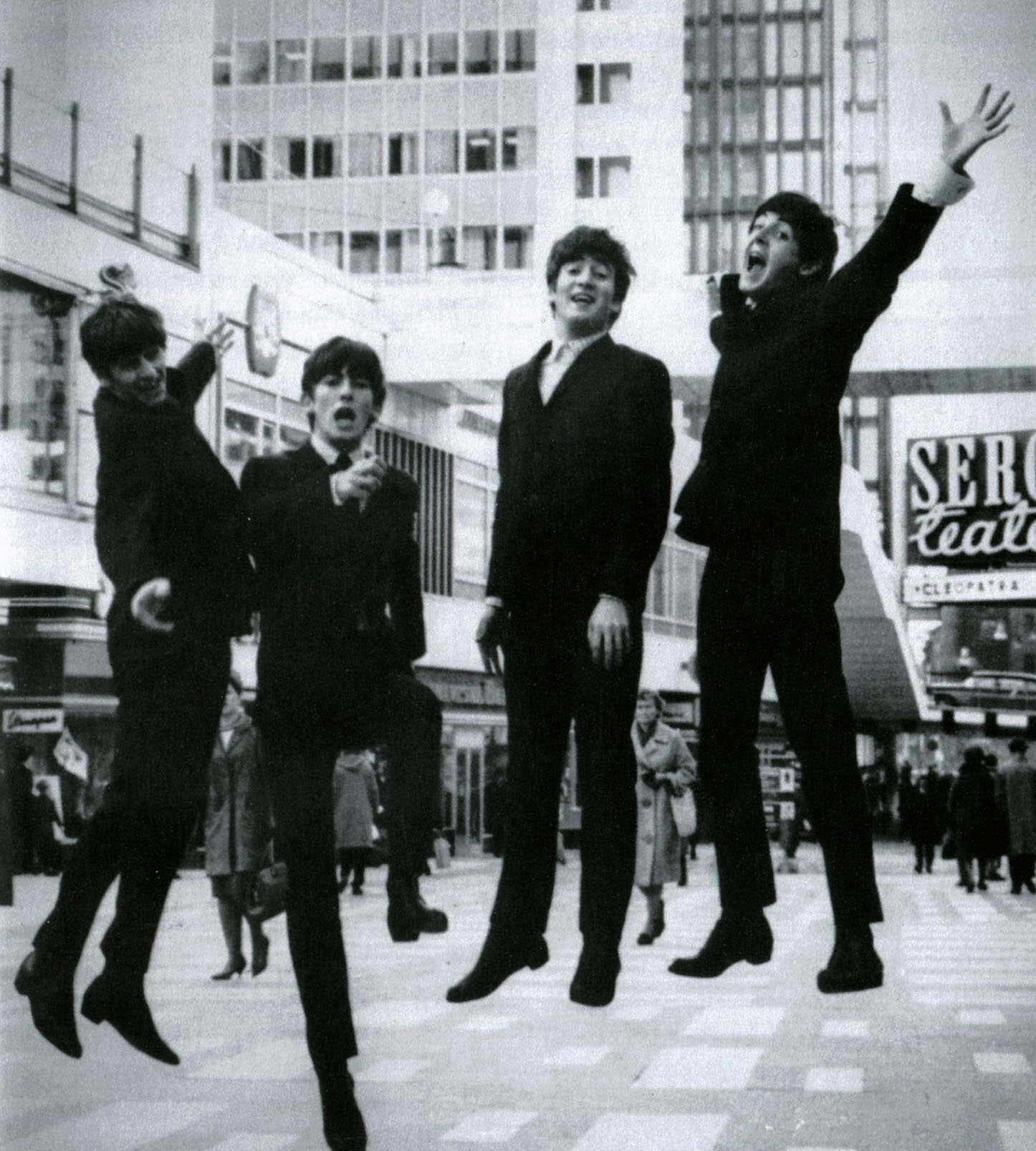
The Beatles had the biggest-selling single of 1963 with "She Loves You", which topped the chart for six non-consecutive weeks and was one of four top 10 singles in their breakthrough year, which included two other number-ones: "From Me to You" and "I Want to Hold Your Hand". "She Loves You" would also rank as the best-selling single of the decade and remains the 8th highest selling song of all time.

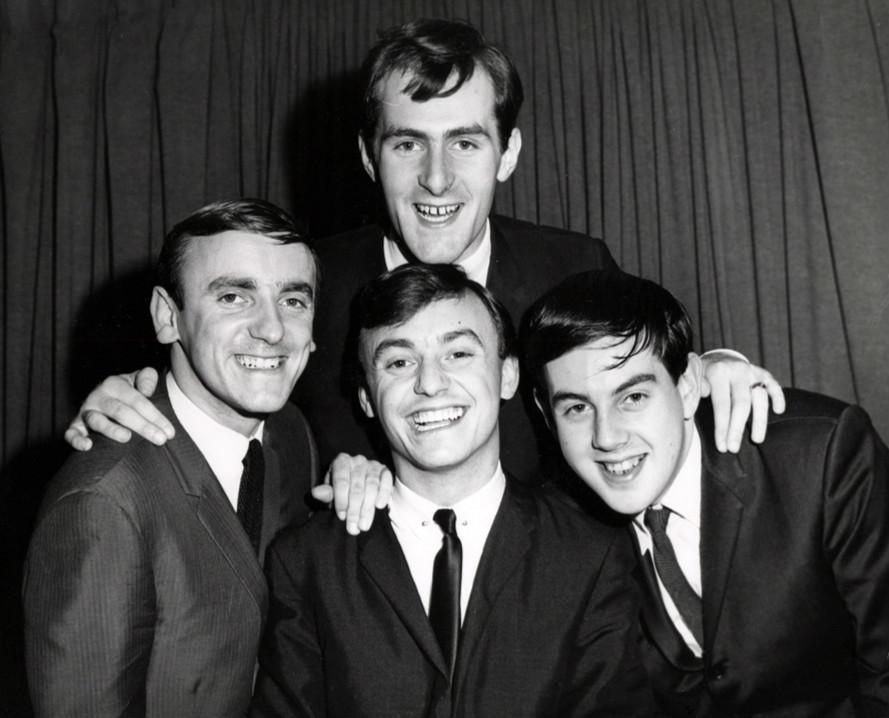
Gerry and the Pacemakers became the very first act to reach number-one in the UK charts with their first three singles: "How Do You Do It?", "I Like It" and "You'll Never Walk Alone".

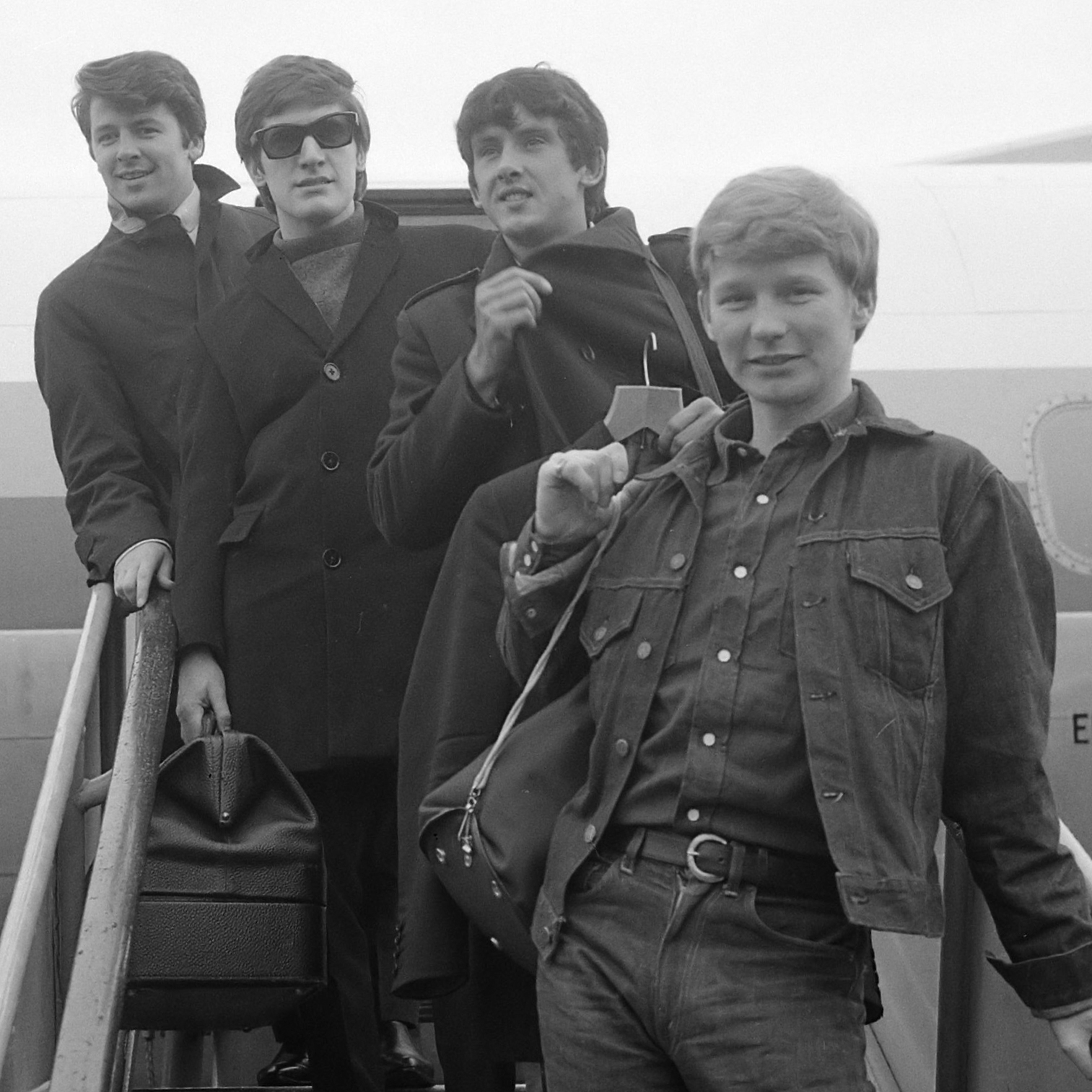
The Searchers entered the top 10 for the first time in 1963 with two singles making the countdown, including their debut release, "Sweets for My Sweet", which reached number-one for two weeks in August.

The UK Singles Chart is one of many music charts compiled by the Official Charts Company that calculates the best-selling singles of the week in the United Kingdom. Before 2004, the chart was only based on the sales of physical singles. This list shows singles that peaked in the top 10 of the UK Singles Chart during 1963, as well as singles which peaked in 1962 and 1964 but were in the top 10 in 1963. The entry date is when the single appeared in the top 10 for the first time (week ending, as published by the Official Charts Company, which is six days after the chart is announced).

One-hundred and three singles were in the top ten in 1963. Nine singles from 1962 remained in the top 10 for several weeks at the beginning of the year, while "Glad All Over" by The Dave Clark Five, "I Only Want to Be with You" by Dusty Springfield and "Twenty Four Hours From Tulsa" by Gene Pitney were all released in 1963 but did not reach their peak until 1964. "The Next Time"/"Bachelor Boy" by Cliff Richard and The Shadows and "Dance On!" by The Shadows were the singles from 1962 to reach their peak in 1963. Twenty-nine artists scored multiple entries in the top 10 in 1963. The Beatles, Chuck Berry, The Dave Clark Five, Dusty Springfield, Gerry and the Pacemakers and The Searchers were among the many artists who achieved their first UK charting top 10 single in 1963.

The first new number-one single of the year was "The Next Time"/"Bachelor Boy" by Cliff Richard and The Shadows. Overall, seventeen different singles peaked at number-one in 1963, with The Beatles and Gerry and the Pacemakers (3) having the joint most singles hit that position.

== Background ==
=== Multiple entries ===
One-hundred and three singles charted in the top 10 in 1963, with ninety-three singles reaching their peak this year. "Sukiyaki" was recorded by Kenny Ball & His Jazzmen and Kyu Sakamoto (version titled "Sukiyaki (Ue o Muite Arukō)") and both versions reached the top 10.

Twenty-seven artists scored multiple entries in the top 10 in 1963. The Shadows secured the record for most top 10 hits in 1963 with nine hit singles, four of which were with Cliff Richard.

The Searchers were one of a number of artists with two top-ten entries, including the number-one single "Sweets for My Sweet". Del Shannon, Joe Brown, Kenny Lynch and Tommy Roe were among the other artists who had multiple top 10 entries in 1963.

=== Chart debuts ===
Thirty-nine artists achieved their first top 10 single in 1963, either as a lead or featured artist. Of these, eight went on to record another hit single that year: Brian Poole, The Crystals, Gerry and the Pacemakers, Kenny Lynch, Paul & Paula, The Searchers, The Springfields and The Tremeloes. Billy J. Kramer & The Dakotas, Dusty Springfield, Freddie and the Dreamers all had two more top 10 singles in 1963. The Beatles had three other entries in their breakthrough year.

The following table (collapsed on desktop site) does not include acts who had previously charted as part of a group and secured their first top 10 solo single.

Artist	Number of top 10s	First entry	Chart position	Other entries
Maureen Evans	1	"Like I Do"	3	—
Mike Berry	1	"Don't You Think It's Time"	6	—
The Outlaws	1	"Don't You Think It's Time"	6	—
Kenny Lynch	2	"Up on the Roof"	10	"You Can Never Stop Me Loving You" (10)
The Beatles	4	"Please Please Me"	2	"From Me to You" (1), "She Loves You" (1), "I Want to Hold Your Hand" (1)
The Springfields	2	"Island of Dreams"	5	"Say I Won't Be There" (5)
Dusty Springfield	3	"Island of Dreams"	5	"Say I Won't Be There" (5), "I Only Want to Be with You" (4) ^{[A]}
The Rooftop Singers	1	"Walk Right In"	10	—
Paul & Paula	2	"Hey Paula"	8	"Young Lovers" (9)
Billie Davis	1	"Tell Him"	10	—
The Bachelors	1	"Charmaine"	6	—
Ned Miller	1	"From a Jack to a King"	2	—
The Cascades	1	"Rhythm of the Rain"	5	—
Gerry and the Pacemakers	3	"How Do You Do It?"	1	"I Like It" (1), "You'll Never Walk Alone" (1)
Billy J. Kramer	3	"Do You Want to Know a Secret?"	2	"Bad to Me" (1), "I'll Keep You Satisfied" (4)
The Dakotas	3	"Do You Want to Know a Secret?"	2	"Bad to Me" (1), "I'll Keep You Satisfied" (4)
Wink Martindale	1	"Deck of Cards"	5	—
Freddie and the Dreamers	3	"If You Gotta Make a Fool of Somebody"	3	"I'm Telling You Now" (2), "You Were Made for Me" (3)
Jim Reeves	1	"Welcome to My World"	6	—
Lesley Gore	1	"It's My Party"	9	—
The Crystals	2	"Da Doo Ron Ron"	5	"Then He Kissed Me" (2)
The Searchers	2	"Sweets for My Sweet"	1	"Sugar and Spice" (2)
Brian Poole	2	"Twist and Shout"	4	"Do You Love Me" (1)
The Tremeloes	2	"Twist and Shout"	4	"Do You Love Me" (1)
Kyu Sakamoto	1	"Sukiyaki (Ue o Muite Arukō)"	6	—
Ken Thorne & His Orchestra	1	"Theme from The Legion's Last Patrol"	4	—
The Surfaris	1	"Wipe Out"	5	—
The Caravelles	1	"You Don't Have to Be a Baby to Cry"	6	—
Trini Lopez	1	"If I Had a Hammer"	4	—
The Roulettes	1	"The First Time"	5	—
The Fourmost	1	"Hello Little Girl"	9	—
Chuck Berry	1	"Let It Rock"/"Memphis, Tennessee"	6	—
The Ronettes	1	"Be My Baby"	4	—
Kathy Kirby	1	"Secret Love"	4	—
Los Indios Tabajaras	1	"María Elena"	5	—
The Dave Clark Five	1	"Glad All Over" ^{[B]}	1	—
The Singing Nun (Sœur Sourire)	1	"Dominique" ^{[C]}	7	—
Gene Pitney	1	"Twenty Four Hours from Tulsa" ^{[D]}	5	—

Notes

Jet Harris and Tony Meehan scored three chart hits as a duo in 1963, including number-one single "Diamonds" in February. They had both been members of The Shadows (formerly The Drifters) since its inception, as well as joining The Vipers Skiffle Group before going solo. "Just Like Eddie" was Heinz's first foray into the chart under his own name, but he had been a bassist in The Tornados, the group debuting with the number-one hit "Telstar" at the end of 1962.

=== Songs from films ===
Original songs from various films entered the top 10 throughout the year. These included "Summer Holiday" (from Summer Holiday), "Theme from The Legion's Last Patrol" (The Legion's Last Patrol), "She Loves You" (A Hard Day's Night), "You'll Never Walk Alone" (Carousel) and "Dominique" (The Singing Nun).

Additionally, a melody used in "Never on Sunday" was turned into a hit single recorded by Brenda Lee as "All Alone Am I". "Do You Want to Know a Secret?", written by Lennon-McCartney and performed by The Beatles and taken into the top 10 by Billy J. Kramer and The Dakotas, was inspired by the tune "I'm Wishing" from Snow White and the Seven Dwarfs. "Secret Love" had first been heard in the 1953 film Calamity Jane, sang by Doris Day. Kathy Kirby took her cover version to number four. "María Elena" started as an instrumental featured in the film Bordertown.

=== Best-selling singles ===
Until 1970 there was no universally recognised year-end best-sellers list. However, in 2011 the Official Charts Company released a list of the best-selling single of each year in chart history from 1952 to date. According to the list, "She Loves You" by The Beatles is officially recorded as the biggest-selling single of 1963. "She Loves You" (1) was also ranked as the best-selling single of the decade, while "I Want to Hold Your Hand" (2) also ranked in the top 10 best-selling singles of the 1960s. "She Loves You" also stands as the 8th biggest-selling single of all time in the UK (as of December 2017).

== Top-ten singles ==
Key

Symbol	Meaning
‡	Single peaked in 1962 but still in chart in 1963.
♦	Single released in 1963 but peaked in 1964.
(#)	Year-end best-selling single.
Entered	The date that the single first appeared in the chart.
Peak	Highest position that the single reached in the UK Singles Chart.

Entered (week ending)	Weeks in top 10	Single	Artist	Peak	Peak reached (week ending)	Weeks at peak
Singles in 1962
27 September 1962	16	"Telstar" ‡ ^{[E]}	The Tornados	1	4 October 1962	5
25 October 1962	10	"Let's Dance" ‡ ^{[F]}	Chris Montez	2	1 November 1962	4
1 November 1962	12	"Lovesick Blues" ‡	Frank Ifield	1	8 November 1962	5
15 November 1962	9	"Bobby's Girl" ‡	Susan Maughan	3	29 November 1962	1
22 November 1962	10	"(Dance with the) Guitar Man" ‡	Duane Eddy & The Rebelettes ^{[G]}	4	27 December 1962	2
29 November 1962	8	"Sun Arise" ‡	Rolf Harris	3	13 December 1962	1
6 December 1962	9	"Return to Sender" ‡	Elvis Presley	1	13 December 1962	3
13 December 1962	11	"The Next Time"/"Bachelor Boy"	Cliff Richard & The Shadows	1	3 January 1963	3
27 December 1962	7	"Dance On!"	The Shadows	1	24 January 1963	1
Singles in 1963
3 January 1963	2	"It Only Took A Minute"	Joe Brown & the Bruvvers	6	10 January 1963	1
10 January 1963	3	"Go Away Little Girl"	Mark Wynter	6	17 January 1963	1
10 January 1963	6	"Like I Do"	Maureen Evans	3	24 January 1963	2
17 January 1963	4	"Globetrotter"	The Tornados	5	24 January 1963	2
24 January 1963	7	"Diamonds"	Jet Harris & Tony Meehan	1	31 January 1963	3
24 January 1963	4	"Don't You Think It's Time"	Mike Berry & The Outlaws	6	24 January 1963	1
24 January 1963	1	"Up on the Roof"	Kenny Lynch	10	24 January 1963	1
31 January 1963	5	"Little Town Flirt"	Del Shannon	4	14 February 1963	1
31 January 1963	8	"The Wayward Wind"	Frank Ifield	1	21 February 1963	3
31 January 1963	1	"Some Kinda Fun"	Chris Montez	10	31 January 1963	1
7 February 1963	8	"Please Please Me"	The Beatles	2	21 February 1963	3
7 February 1963	7	"Island of Dreams" ^{[H]}	The Springfields	5	28 March 1963	1
14 February 1963	4	"Loop-De-Loop"	Frankie Vaughan	5	28 February 1963	1
14 February 1963	2	"All Alone Am I"	Brenda Lee	7	21 February 1963	1
14 February 1963	3	"Sukiyaki"	Kenny Ball & His Jazzmen	10	14 February 1963	3
21 February 1963	5	"The Night Has a Thousand Eyes"	Bobby Vee	3	28 February 1963	1
28 February 1963	6	"That's What Love Will Do"	Joe Brown & the Bruvvers	3	14 March 1963	2
28 February 1963	8	"Summer Holiday"	Cliff Richard & The Shadows	1	14 March 1963	3
7 March 1963	6	"Like I've Never Been Gone"	Billy Fury	3	28 March 1963	1
7 March 1963	1	"Walk Right In"	The Rooftop Singers	10	7 March 1963	1
14 March 1963	2	"Hey Paula"	Paul & Paula	8	14 March 1963	1
14 March 1963	8	"Foot Tapper"	The Shadows	1	28 March 1963	1
14 March 1963	1	"Tell Him"	Billie Davis	10	14 March 1963	1
21 March 1963	4	"Charmaine"	The Bachelors	6	28 March 1963	1
28 March 1963	8	"From a Jack to a King"	Ned Miller	2	11 April 1963	3
28 March 1963	6	"Rhythm of the Rain"	The Cascades	5	11 April 1963	2
28 March 1963	9	"How Do You Do It?"	Gerry and the Pacemakers	1	11 April 1963	3
4 April 1963	3	"Say Wonderful Things" ^{[I]}	Ronnie Carroll	6	4 April 1963	1
4 April 1963	5	"Brown-Eyed Handsome Man"	Buddy Holly	3	18 April 1963	1
11 April 1963	3	"The Folk Singer"	Tommy Roe	4	18 April 1963	2
18 April 1963	4	"Say I Won't Be There"	The Springfields	5	25 April 1963	2
18 April 1963	8	"In Dreams" ^{[J]}	Roy Orbison	6	9 May 1963	2
25 April 1963	11	"From Me to You"	The Beatles	1	2 May 1963	7
25 April 1963	4	"Nobody's Darlin' But Mine"	Frank Ifield	4	2 May 1963	2
2 May 1963	6	"Can't Get Used to Losing You"	Andy Williams	2	16 May 1963	1
9 May 1963	7	"Scarlett O'Hara"	Jet Harris & Tony Meehan	2	23 May 1963	1
9 May 1963	5	"Two Kinds of Teardrops"	Del Shannon	5	16 May 1963	1
9 May 1963	2	"Losing You" ^{[K]}	Brenda Lee	10	9 May 1963	2
16 May 1963	6	"Lucky Lips"	Cliff Richard & The Shadows	4	23 May 1963	2
16 May 1963	7	"Do You Want to Know a Secret?"	Billy J. Kramer & The Dakotas	2	30 May 1963	2
23 May 1963	2	"Young Lovers"	Paul & Paula	9	23 May 1963	2
30 May 1963	5	"When Will You Say I Love You"	Billy Fury	3	6 June 1963	1
30 May 1963	9	"Deck of Cards"	Wink Martindale	5	4 July 1963	1
6 June 1963	8	"Take These Chains from My Heart"	Ray Charles	5	6 June 1963	3
6 June 1963	10	"I Like It"	Gerry and the Pacemakers	1	20 June 1963	4
13 June 1963	5	"If You Gotta Make a Fool of Somebody"	Freddie and the Dreamers	3	20 June 1963	2
20 June 1963	8	"Atlantis"	The Shadows	2	27 June 1963	2
27 June 1963	4	"Bo Diddley"	Buddy Holly	4	11 July 1963	1
27 June 1963	2	"Falling"	Roy Orbison	9	27 June 1963	1
4 July 1963	9	"Confessin' (That I Love You)"	Frank Ifield	1	18 July 1963	2
4 July 1963	3	"Welcome to My World" ^{[L]}	Jim Reeves	6	11 July 1963	1
11 July 1963	4	"It's My Party"	Lesley Gore	9	11 July 1963	3
11 July 1963	6	"(You're the) Devil in Disguise"	Elvis Presley	1	1 August 1963	1
18 July 1963	6	"Da Doo Ron Ron"	The Crystals	5	18 July 1963	3
18 July 1963	8	"Sweets for My Sweet"	The Searchers	1	8 August 1963	2
25 July 1963	5	"Twist and Shout"	Brian Poole & The Tremeloes	4	1 August 1963	3
1 August 1963	3	"Sukiyaki (Ue o Muite Arukō)"	Kyu Sakamoto	6	8 August 1963	1
8 August 1963	4	"In Summer"	Billy Fury	5	22 August 1963	1
8 August 1963	1	"You Can Never Stop Me Loving You"	Kenny Lynch	10	8 August 1963	1
15 August 1963	6	"Bad to Me"	Billy J. Kramer & The Dakotas	1	22 August 1963	3
15 August 1963	4	"Theme from The Legion's Last Patrol" ^{[M]}	Ken Thorne	4	29 August 1963	1
15 August 1963	6	"Wipe Out"	The Surfaris	5	29 August 1963	1
22 August 1963	5	"I'm Telling You Now"	Freddie and the Dreamers	2	29 August 1963	2
22 August 1963	7	"I'll Never Get Over You"	Johnny Kidd & the Pirates	4	12 September 1963	1
29 August 1963	4	"You Don't Have to Be a Baby to Cry"	The Caravelles	6	12 September 1963	1
29 August 1963	7	"It's All in the Game"	Cliff Richard	2	12 September 1963	3
5 September 1963	21	"She Loves You" (#1)	The Beatles	1	12 September 1963	6
5 September 1963	5	"Just Like Eddie"	Heinz	5	26 September 1963	1
5 September 1963	5	"I Want to Stay Here"	Steve and Eydie	3	26 September 1963	1
12 September 1963	3	"Applejack" ^{[N]}	Jet Harris & Tony Meehan	4	26 September 1963	1
26 September 1963	8	"Do You Love Me"	Brian Poole & The Tremeloes	1	10 October 1963	3
26 September 1963	7	"If I Had a Hammer"	Trini Lopez	4	10 October 1963	1
26 September 1963	8	"Then He Kissed Me"	The Crystals	2	10 October 1963	2
26 September 1963	2	"Wishing" ^{[O]}	Buddy Holly	10	26 September 1963	2
3 October 1963	3	"Shindig"	The Shadows	6	10 October 1963	1
3 October 1963	9	"Blue Bayou"/"Mean Woman Blues"	Roy Orbison	3	7 November 1963	1
10 October 1963	4	"The First Time"	Adam Faith with The Roulettes	5	17 October 1963	1
17 October 1963	9	"You'll Never Walk Alone"	Gerry and the Pacemakers	1	31 October 1963	4
17 October 1963	1	"Everybody"	Tommy Roe	9	17 October 1963	1
17 October 1963	6	"I (Who Have Nothing)"	Shirley Bassey	6	24 October 1963	1
24 October 1963	1	"Hello Little Girl"	The Fourmost	9	24 October 1963	1
24 October 1963	5	"Let It Rock"/"Memphis, Tennessee"	Chuck Berry	6	14 November 1963	1
31 October 1963	5	"Sugar and Spice"	The Searchers	2	14 November 1963	1
7 November 1963	4	"Be My Baby"	The Ronettes	4	21 November 1963	1
14 November 1963	8	"Don't Talk to Him"	Cliff Richard & The Shadows	2	5 December 1963	1
21 November 1963	8	"Secret Love"	Kathy Kirby	4	12 December 1963	2
21 November 1963	3	"I'll Keep You Satisfied"	Billy J. Kramer & The Dakotas	4	28 November 1963	1
28 November 1963	8	"You Were Made for Me"	Freddie and the Dreamers	3	5 December 1963	4
28 November 1963	6	"María Elena"	Los Indios Tabajaras	5	12 December 1963	1
5 December 1963	12	"Glad All Over" ♦	The Dave Clark Five	1	16 January 1964	2
5 December 1963	9	"I Only Want to Be with You" ♦	Dusty Springfield	4	9 January 1964	3
5 December 1963	10	"I Want to Hold Your Hand"	The Beatles	1	12 December 1963	5
12 December 1963	6	"Dominique"	The Singing Nun (Sœur Sourire)	7	26 December 1963	2
19 December 1963	8	"Twenty Four Hours from Tulsa" ♦	Gene Pitney	5	2 January 1964	2

== Entries by artist ==
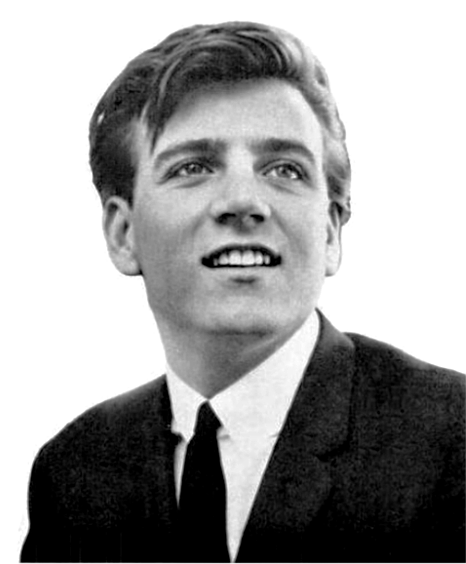
Billy J. Kramer and his group The Dakotas secured three top 10 hits this year, the most successful of which was "Bad to Me", which reached number-one in August.

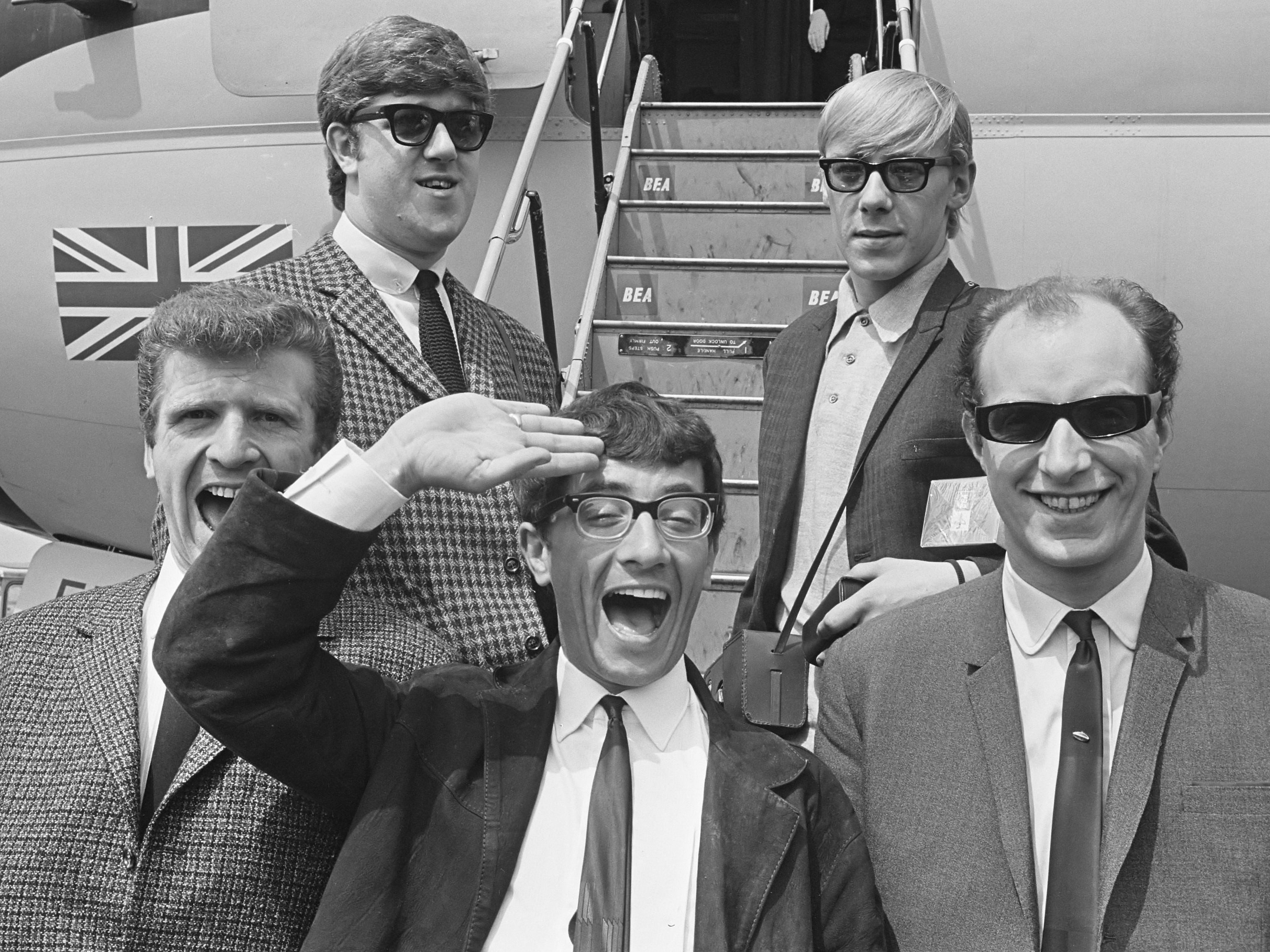
Freddie and the Dreamers had three top 10 entries in 1963, the highest-charting of which was "I'm Telling You Now", which peaked at number two.

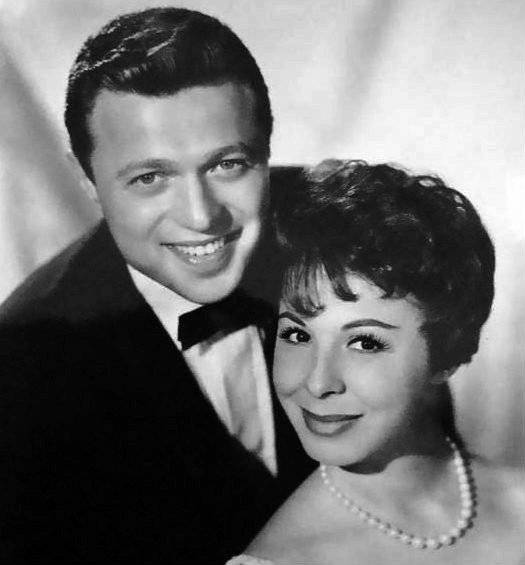
Husband and wife duo Steve Lawrence and Eydie Gormé reached the UK top 10 in September of this year with their duet "I Want To Stay Here", which peaked at number three. Lawrence and Gormé had both previously achieved a top 10 solo hit; Lawrence made number four in 1960 with "Footsteps" while Gormé made number ten in 1962 with "Yes, My Darling Daughter".

The following table shows artists who achieved two or more top 10 entries in 1963, including singles that reached their peak in 1962 or 1964. The figures include both main artists and featured artists. The total number of weeks an artist spent in the top ten in 1963 is also shown.

Entries	Artist	Weeks	Singles
8	The Shadows ^{[P]}	55	"Atlantis", "Dance On!", "Don't Talk to Him", "Foot Tapper, "Lucky Lips", "Shindig", "Summer Holiday", "The Next Time"/"Bachelor Boy"
5	Cliff Richard ^{[P]}	35	"Don't Talk to Him", "It's All in the Game, "Lucky Lips", "Summer Holiday", "The Next Time"/"Bachelor Boy"
4	The Beatles	35	"From Me to You", "I Want to Hold Your Hand", "Please Please Me", "She Loves You"
4	Frank Ifield ^{[Q]}	25	"Confessin' (That I Love You)", "Lovesick Blues", "Nobody's Darlin' But Mine", "The Wayward Wind"
3	Billy Fury	15	"In Summer", "Like I've Never Been Gone", "When Will You Say I Love You"
3	Billy J. Kramer & The Dakotas	16	"Bad to Me", "Do You Want to Know a Secret?", "I'll Keep You Satisfied"
3	Buddy Holly	11	"Bo Diddley", "Brown-Eyed Handsome Man", "Wishing"
3	Dusty Springfield ^{[R]}^{[S]}	14	"I Only Want to Be with You", "Island of Dreams", "Say I Won't Be There"
3	Freddie and the Dreamers	14	"If You Gotta Make a Fool of Somebody", "I'm Telling You Now", "You Were Made for Me"
3	Gerry and the Pacemakers	29	"How Do You Do It?", "I Like It", "You'll Never Walk Alone"
3	Heinz ^{[T]}	12	"Globetrotter", "Just Like Eddie", "Telstar"
3	Jet Harris	17	"Applejack", "Diamonds", "Scarlett O'Hara"
3	Roy Orbison	19	"Blue Bayou"/"Mean Woman Blues", "Falling", "In Dreams"
3	Tony Meehan	17	"Applejack", "Diamonds", "Scarlett O'Hara"
2	Brenda Lee	4	"All Alone Am I", "Losing You"
2	Brian Poole & The Tremeloes	13	"Do You Love Me", "Twist and Shout"
2	Chris Montez ^{[Q]}	2	"Let's Dance", "Some Kinda Fun"
2	The Crystals	14	"Da Doo Ron Ron", "Don't Talk to Him"
2	Del Shannon	10	"Little Town Flirt", "Two Kinds of Teardrops"
2	Elvis Presley ^{[Q]}	12	"Return to Sender", "(You're the) Devil in Disguise"
2	Joe Brown & the Bruvvers	8	"It Only Took a Minute", "That's What Love Will Do"
2	Kenny Lynch	2	"Up on the Roof", "You Can Never Stop Me Loving You"
2	Paul & Paula	4	"Hey Paula", "Young Lovers"
2	The Searchers	13	"Sugar and Spice", "Sweets for My Sweet"
2	The Springfields	11	"Island of Dreams", "Say I Won't Be There"
2	Tommy Roe	4	"Everybody", "The Folk Singer"
2	The Tornados ^{[Q]}	7	"Globetrotter", "Telstar"

== Notes ==
- ^{a} "I Only Want to Be with You" reached its peak of number four on 15 January 1964 (week ending).
- ^{b} "Glad All Over" reached its peak of number one on 22 January 1964 (week ending).
- ^{c} "Dominique" reached its peak of number seven on 1 January 1964 (week ending).
- ^{d} "Twenty Four Hours from Tulsa" reached its peak of number five on 8 January 1964 (week ending).
- ^{e} "Telstar" re-entered the top 10 at number 10 on 23 January 1963 (week ending).
- ^{f} "Let's Dance" re-entered the top 10 at number 10 on 2 January 1963 (week ending).
- ^{g} The Rebelettes were actually The Blossoms, a girl group consisting of Darlene Love, Fanita James, and Jean King.
- ^{h} "Island of Dreams" re-entered the top 10 at number 8 on 27 February 1963 (week ending) for 6 weeks.
- ^{i} "Say Wonderful Things" was the United Kingdom's entry at the Eurovision Song Contest in 1963.
- ^{j} "In Dreams" re-entered the top 10 at number 10 on 19 June 1963 (week ending).
- ^{k} "Losing You" re-entered the top 10 at number 10 on 29 May 1963 (week ending).
- ^{l} "Welcome to My World" re-entered the top 10 at number 9 on 7 August 1963 (week ending).
- ^{m} "Theme from The Legion's Last Patrol" re-entered the top 10 at number 10 on 18 September 1963 (week ending).
- ^{n} "Applejack" re-entered the top 10 at number 9 on 16 October 1963 (week ending).
- ^{o} "Wishing" re-entered the top 10 at number 10 on 16 October 1963 (week ending).
- ^{p} Figure includes single that first charted in 1962 but peaked in 1963.
- ^{q} Figure includes single that peaked in 1962.
- ^{r} Figure includes single that peaked in 1964.
- ^{s} Figures includes two top 10 hits with the group The Springfields.
- ^{t} Figures includes two top 10 hits with the group The Tornados.

== See also ==
- 1963 in British music
- List of number-one singles from the 1960s (UK)
