= VG-lista 1963 =

Norwegian music chart

This is a complete list of all the singles that entered the VG-lista, the official Norwegian hit-chart, in 1963. A total of 65 singles appeared on the VG-lista that year and these are all listed below according to how well they have charted over time.

== Top 1963 ==
1. Arne Bendiksen – "Jeg vil ha en blå ballong" (2 weeks)
2. Cliff Richard – "Summer Holiday" (7 weeks)
3. Ned Miller – "From a Jack to a King" (4 weeks)
4. Cliff Richard – "Lucky Lips" (8 weeks)
5. Elvis Presley – "(You're the) Devil in Disguise" (6 weeks)
6. Kyu Sakamoto – "Sukiyaki" (7 weeks)
7. Wenche Myhre – "Gi meg en cowboy til mann" (5 weeks)
8. Bobby Bare – "Detroit City" (3 weeks)
9. Cliff Richard – "Don't Talk to Him" (3 weeks)

== Top singles of 1963 ==
Position	Artist	Song title	Highest position	Points
1	Olkabilamo	"Singel og sand"	4	371
2	Cliff Richard and the Shadows	"Summer Holiday"	1	353
3	Bobby Bare	"Detroit City"	1	348
4	Cliff Richard and the Shadows	"Lucky Lips"	1	315
5	Kyu Sakamoto	"Sukiyaki"	1	309
6	Ray Adams	"De tusen sjöars land"	2	287
7	Ned Miller	"From a Jack to a King"	1	280
7	Wencke Myhre	"Gi meg en cowboy til mann"	1	280
9	The Beatles	"She Loves You"	1	270
10	Elvis Presley	"(You're the) Devil in Disguise"	1	260
11	Arne Bendiksen	"Jeg vil ha en blå ballong"	1	254
12	Eydie Gorme	"Blame It on the Bossa Nova"	2	240
13	Paul & Paula	"Hey Paula"	2	230
14	Elvis Presley	"Kiss Me Quick"	3	224
15	Anna-Lena Löfgren	"Regniga natt"	4	221
16	Åse Wentzel/Jan Høiland	"Midnattstango"	3	203
17	Trini Lopez	"If I Had a Hammer"	2	188
18	Cliff Richard and the Shadows	"Don't Talk To Him"	1	185
19	The Key Brothers	"Fjerne land"	4	183
20	Jim Reeves	"Welcome to My World"	3	182
21	Elvis Presley	"Bossa Nova Baby"	2	179
22	Ragnhild Michelsen / Rolf Just Nilsen	"Dagligliv i folkehjemmet"	2	171
23	The Shadows	"Atlantis"	4	161
24	Cliff Richard	"It's All in the Game"	2	158
25	Bobby Bare	"500 Miles (Away from Home)"	7	141
26	Elvis Presley	"One Broken Heart for Sale"	2	138
27	Wencke Myhre	"Ei snerten snelle"	5	133
28	Cliff Richard	"The Next Time"	2	132
29	The Caravelles	"You Don't Have to Be a Baby to Cry"	3	128
30	Åse Thoresen"	"Ser du Jan så hils fra meg"	7	124
31	The Shadows	"Dance On"	2	120
32	Jet Harris & Tony Meehan	"Diamonds"	3	81
33	Fats Domino	"Red Sails in the Sunset"	6	64
34	The Cascades	"Rhythm of the Rain"	7	61
34	The Crystals	"Then He Kissed Me"	8	61
36	Frank Ifield	"Nobody's Darling But Mine"	5	60
37	The Searchers	"Sweets for My Sweet"	8	59
38	The Shadows	"Foot Tapper"	5	58
39	Brian Poole and the Tremeloes	"Do You Love Me"	5	54
39	Frankie Vaughan	"Loop the Loop"	5	54
39	Paul & Paula	"Young Lovers"	7	54
42	Gerry and the Pacemakers	"How Do You Do It?"	7	53
43	Various Artists	"All Star Festival"	6	52
44	Lars Lönndahl	"Midnattstango"	6	51
45	Billy J. Kramer and the Dakotas	"Do You Want to Know a Secret"	7	50
46	Grethe & Jørgen Ingmann	"Dansevise"	7	47
47	The Ronettes	"Be My Baby"	9	46
48	Ragnhild Michelsen / Rolf Just Nilsen	"Jul i folkehjemmet"	10	44
49	The Shadows	"Shindig"	5	43
50	Gerry & The Pacemakers	"I Like It"	6	42
51	Frank Ifield	"Confessin'"	5	41
52	Ray Charles	"Take These Chains from My Heart"	7	38
52	Wencke Myhre	"Tenk så deilig det skal bli"	8	38
54	Roger Engvik	"Kem har tatt min fena"	8	37
54	Botho Timber	"Tanze mit mir in den Morgen"	8	37
56	Cliff Richard	"Bachelor Boy"	8	34
57	The Rooftop Singers	"Walk Right In"	10	32
58	Roy Orbison	"Blue Bayou"	10	22
59	Billy Fury	"In Summer"	10	21
60	Grynet Molvig	"Ser du Jan så hils fra meg"	7	14
61	Frank Ifield	"Wayward Wind"	8	13
61	Wencke Myhre	"Bli med ut og fisk"	8	13
63	The Beatles	"From Me to You"	9	12
64	Alice Babs	"St. Louis Blues Twist"	10	11
64	Olkabilamo	"Fiskarlåt"	10	11
