= Gee Whizz It's You =

1961 single by Cliff Richard and the Shadows

Single by Cliff Richard and the Shadows

from the album Me and My Shadows
- B-side: "I Cannot Find a True Love"
- Released: March 1961
- Recorded: 17 March 1960
- Studio: EMI Studios, London
- Genre: Rock and roll; teen pop
- Length: 2:08
- Label: Columbia
- Songwriters: Hank Marvin; Ian Samwell
- Producer: Norrie Paramor

Cliff Richard and the Shadows singles chronology
"Theme for a Dream" (1961)	"Gee Whizz It's You" (1961)	"A Girl Like You" (1961)

"Gee Whizz It's You" is a song by Cliff Richard and the Shadows, released as a single in March 1961 from their album Me and My Shadows. Despite not initially being officially released in the UK, it peaked at number 4 on the UK Singles Chart.

== Release ==
"Gee Whizz It's You" was initially only intended for release in Continental Europe and, described as being export only, not released in the UK because it was included on the album Me and My Shadows and because "Theme for a Dream" has been released as a single towards the end of February. However, record dealers were able to order overseas records and due to demand from fans, thousands of copies were imported into the UK. After the single entered the UK top-20, the label "recognised its potential and belatedly released it as Cliff's 13th single". It was the first European single to chart in the UK.

== Track listing ==
1. "Gee Whizz It's You" – 2:08
2. "I Cannot Find a True Love" – 2:34

== Personnel ==
- Cliff Richard – vocals
- Hank Marvin – lead guitar
- Bruce Welch – rhythm guitar
- Jet Harris – bass guitar
- Tony Meehan – drums

== Charts ==
Chart (1961)	Peak position
Australia (Kent Music Report)	62
Belgium (Ultratop 50 Flanders)	20
Belgium (Ultratop 50 Wallonia)	29
India (The Voice, Calcutta)	5
Ireland (Evening Herald)	3
UK Singles (OCC)	4
