= Theme for a Dream =

1961 single by Cliff Richard and the Shadows

Single by Cliff Richard and the Shadows
- B-side: "Mumblin' Mosie"
- Released: 24 February 1961
- Recorded: 28 January 1961
- Studio: EMI Studios, London
- Genre: Pop
- Length: 2:06
- Label: Columbia
- Songwriters: Mort Garson; Earl Shuman
- Producer: Norrie Paramor

Cliff Richard and the Shadows singles chronology
"Catch Me" (1961)	"Theme for a Dream" (1961)	"Gee Whizz It's You" (1961)

"Theme for a Dream" is a song by Cliff Richard and the Shadows, released as a single in February 1961. It peaked at number 3 on the UK Singles Chart and also received a silver disc for 250,000 sales.

== Release and reception ==
"Theme for a Dream" was the first song by Richard to feature a female chorus, sung by the Mike Sammes Singers. When Richard and the Shadows got the song they "liked it, but it wasn't really us … but we did it because we felt it was a change of direction as far as we were concerned".

The single exceeded 200,000 advance sales in the UK. However, in Spain, it was banned because of its supposedly suggestive lyrics due to the Francoist censorship.

The B-side, "Mumblin' Mosie", was written and originally recorded by American Johnny Otis in 1960 and had been a minor hit for him on the Billboard Hot 100. Richard had previously recorded another of Otis' songs, "Willie and the Hand Jive", which he had released as the B-side to "Fall in Love with You".

Richard also recorded a German-language version of "Theme for a Dream", titled "Schön wie ein Traum", in April 1961 with backing vocals by the Hansen Girls. It was released as a single in Germany in June 1961 with the B-side "Vreneli", which was an original German song.

Reviewing for Disc, Don Nicholl described "Theme for a Dream" as an "attractive tune and lyric married very well indeed. Gets into your head right from the start".

The melody of the track "Pal Pal.... Har Pal" from the 2006 Bollywood film Lage Raho Munna Bhai was lifted from "Theme for a Dream"

== Track listing ==
7": Columbia / DB 4593

1. "Theme for a Dream" – 2:06
2. "Mumblin' Mosie" – 2:17

7": Columbia / C 21 843 (Germany)

1. "Schön wie ein Traum" – 2:05
2. "Vreneli" – 2:39

== Personnel ==
- Cliff Richard – vocals
- Hank Marvin – lead guitar
- Bruce Welch – rhythm guitar
- Jet Harris – bass guitar
- Tony Meehan – drums
- Mike Sammes Singers – backing vocals

== Charts ==
Chart (1961)	Peak position
Australia (Kent Music Report)	22
Belgium (Ultratop 50 Flanders)	16
Belgium (Ultratop 50 Wallonia)	33
Denmark (Quans Musikbureau)	6
India (The Voice, Calcutta)	7
Ireland (Evening Herald)	4
Netherlands (Single Top 100)	12
New Zealand (Lever Hit Parade)	3
UK Singles (Official Charts)	3
US Cash Box Looking Ahead	12

=== German-language version ===
"Schön wie ein Traum"

Chart (1961)	Peak position
Germany (GfK)	33

"Vreneli"

Chart (1961)	Peak position
Germany (GfK)	50
