= Cliff (album) =

1959 live album (live in the studio) by Cliff Richard and The Drifters (The Shadows)

Live album (live in the studio) by Cliff Richard and The Drifters
- Released: April 1959
- Recorded: 9–10 February 1959
- Venue: Abbey Road Studios (Studio 2)
- Genre: Rock and roll
- Length: 37:46
- Label: Columbia (EMI)
- Producer: Norrie Paramor

Cliff Richard and The Drifters chronology
Cliff (1959)	Cliff Sings (1959)

Alternative cover
- French release Dance with Cliff Richard

Cliff is the 1959 debut album of British singer Cliff Richard and his band the Drifters (later known as the Shadows).

The album is a live-in-the-studio recording of Richard's and the Shadows' early rock and roll in front of an invited audience of several hundred fans. It was recorded over two nights during February 1959 in Studio 2 at EMI Recording Studios (later known as Abbey Road Studios) with Norrie Paramor as producer.

The album contains renderings of Richard's hit single "Move It", both tracks of the yet to be released Drifters' instrumental single "Jet Black" and "Driftin'" and covers of rock 'n' roll standards made famous by Elvis Presley, Buddy Holly, Little Richard, Jerry Lee Lewis, Roy Orbison, Ricky Nelson, Ritchie Valens and Gene Vincent.

The album reached number 4 in the UK album chart and spent 31 weeks on the chart - a time when the chart was only a top ten.

== Release ==
The album was released originally in mono only (Columbia 33 SX 1147) but was also released in two parts as 45 rpm EPs (Cliff No.1 and Cliff No.2 in both mono and stereo. Both versions use the same takes but with slightly different audience noise.

The album was repackaged with the title Dance with Cliff Richard for release in France (Columbia 33 FPX 185).

The album was first released on CD in 1987 (EMI CDP 7482772) in the original mono version. It was reissued in 1998 (EMI 495 4382) with both the mono and stereo versions on the same disc. It was also released in 2001 (EMI 534 6002) with the stereo version only along with the stereo version of the follow-up album Cliff Sings as part of the 2 on 1 series.

== Track listing ==
Side one
No.	Title	Writer(s)	Original artist	Length
1.	"Apron Strings"	George David Weiss, Aaron Schroeder	Billy the Kid	2:40
2.	"My Babe"	Willie Dixon	Little Walter	2:21
3.	"Down the Line"	Roy Orbison	Roy Orbison	1:59
4.	"I Got a Feeling"	Baker Knight	Ricky Nelson	1:48
5.	"Jet Black" (The Drifters^{[A]})	Jet Harris	The Drifters^{[A]}	2:13
6.	"Baby I Don't Care"	Jerry Leiber and Mike Stoller	Elvis Presley	2:08
7.	"Donna"	Ritchie Valens	Ritchie Valens	3:06
8.	"Move It"	Ian Samwell	Cliff Richard	2:09

Side two
No.	Title	Writer(s)	Original artist	Length
1.	"Ready Teddy"	John Marascalco, Robert Blackwell	Little Richard	1:47
2.	"Too Much"	Lee Rosenberg, Bernard Weinman	Elvis Presley	2:16
3.	"Don't Bug Me Baby"	Leon Luallen, Johnny Bragg	Milton Allen	2:16
4.	"Driftin'" (The Drifters^{[A]})	Hank Marvin	The Drifters^{[A]}	2:46
5.	"That'll Be the Day"	Buddy Holly, Jerry Allison	Buddy Holly	2:09
6.	"Be-Bop-A-Lula" (The Drifters^{[A]})	Gene Vincent	Gene Vincent	2:13
7.	"Danny"	Ben Weisman, Fred Wise	Elvis Presley	2:54
8.	"Whole Lotta Shakin' Goin On"	Dave "Curly" Williams	Big Maybelle, Jerry Lee Lewis	2:59

Notes:

A Refers to the original name of UK band, the Shadows, as they were known from August 1958 until October 1959 (when "Travellin' Light" was released). The UK band are not be confused with the US band of the same name.

== Unreleased tracks ==
Some tracks were scheduled or recorded for the album but not included. A version of Elvis Presley's "One Night" recorded in the same session was later released on The Rock 'N' Roll Years 1958-1963 (1997). Two other tracks were recorded but not released - Conway Twitty's "It's Only Make Believe" and The Weavers' "Kisses Sweeter than Wine" (which had been a hit in the UK in 1958 for Frankie Vaughan).

== Personnel ==
Cliff Richard and the Drifters

- Cliff Richard – lead vocals
- Hank Marvin – lead guitar
- Bruce Welch – rhythm guitar
- Jet Harris – electric bass
- Tony Meehan – drums

Additional musicians

- Mike Sammes Singers – backing vocals (on "Donna" and "Danny")

Production

- Produced by Norrie Paramor
- Engineered by Malcolm Addey
