= A Girl Like You (Cliff Richard and The Shadows song) =

"A Girl like You"

Single by Cliff Richard and the Shadows
- B-side: "Now's the Time to Fall in Love"
- Released: 16 June 1961
- Recorded: 28 January 1961
- Studio: EMI Studios, London
- Genre: Pop
- Length: 2:31
- Label: Columbia (EMI) 45-DB 4667
- Songwriter(s): Jerry Lordan
- Producer(s): Norrie Paramor

Cliff Richard and the Shadows singles chronology
"Gee Whizz It's You" (1961)	"A Girl like You" (1961)	"When the Girl in Your Arms Is the Girl in Your Heart" (1961)

"A Girl Like You" is a song written by Jerry Lordan and recorded by Cliff Richard and the Shadows in June 1961. It peaked at number 3 on the UK Singles Chart.

== Track listing ==
1. "A Girl Like You" – 2:31
2. "Now's the Time to Fall in Love" – 2:08

== Personnel ==
- Cliff Richard – vocals
- Hank Marvin – lead guitar
- Bruce Welch – rhythm guitar
- Jet Harris – bass guitar
- Tony Meehan – drums

== Charts ==
Chart (1961)	Peak position
Australia (Kent Music Report)	22
Belgium (Ultratop 50 Flanders)	15
Belgium (Ultratop 50 Wallonia)	50
Hong Kong	1
India (The Voice, Calcutta)	1
Ireland (Evening Herald)	4
Netherlands (Single Top 100)	7
Norway (VG-lista)	2
South Africa (South African & Lourenço Marques Radio)	1
Sweden (Sverigetopplistan)	4
UK Singles (OCC)	1
