= Jerry Lordan =

English songwriter, composer and singer (1934–1995)

Background information
- Born: Jeremiah Patrick Lordan; 30 April 1934; Paddington, London, England
- Died: 24 July 1995 (aged 61) Shrewsbury, Shropshire, England
- Genre: Popular music
- Occupations: Singer, songwriter, composer
- Years active: 1958-1995
- Label: Parlophone

Jeremiah Patrick Lordan (30 April 1934 – 24 July 1995) was an English songwriter, composer and singer. He had three hit singles on the UK Singles Chart before focusing purely on songwriting. Amongst his songwriting credits were the chart hits "I've Waited So Long", "Apache", "Wonderful Land", "Atlantis", "Diamonds", and "A Girl Like You".

== Early life and education ==
Born as Jeremiah Patrick Lordan in Paddington, London, England, Lordan taught himself to play piano and guitar as a child. He attended Finchley Catholic Grammar and went into National Service in the Royal Air Force as a radar operator. On leaving the RAF in 1955, he held a number of jobs including comedian, singer and in advertising.

== Career ==
He began song-writing, and in 1958, with the help of contacts made in the advertising business a demo of one of his songs was heard by a record producer. The song, "A House, A Car and a Wedding Ring" was recorded by Mike Preston on Decca Records. It did not sell well, but the song was successfully covered by the American rockabilly star, Dale Hawkins, on the Checker label. A later song, "I've Waited So Long" was recorded by the young Anthony Newley on Decca and got to number 3 on the UK Singles Chart in May 1959. He was signed as a singer to Parlophone and had three charting singles in 1960, the most successful being "Who Could Be Bluer?", produced by George Martin.

He found real fame as a composer with the instrumental, "Apache". It was originally recorded by Bert Weedon, but Lordan did not like the version. Weedon's label, Top Rank, did not release it immediately. On tour with the Shadows, Lordan demonstrated the tune to bass player Jet Harris, reportedly picking out the tune on a ukulele as confirmed by the Shadows on BBC Radio 2 documentary, Out of the Shadows. When the rest of the band heard it, they agreed to record it. It was released in July 1960 and hit number one in August, staying at the top for five weeks. The Shadows' version was voted Top Record of 1960 in the New Musical Express Readers' Poll. The tune was also recorded by the Danish guitarist Jorgen Ingmann, who took it to number two on the Billboard Hot 100 in 1961.

Lordan gave up singing for full-time writing. He wrote the Shadows' UK number one hit "Wonderful Land" (1962) and their hits "Atlantis" (which reached number two in 1963) and "Mary Anne" (a rare vocal single from the group). He achieved a further number one, "Diamonds" for the ex-Shadows' Jet Harris and Tony Meehan in 1963. Harris and Meehan also recorded his song "Scarlett O'Hara" taking it to number two in the same chart. He wrote other hits for Cliff Richard ("A Girl Like You"), Shane Fenton and Louise Cordet ("I'm Just a Baby").

By the end of the 1960s, the success was largely over and personal difficulties dogged Lordan through the 1970s. He became involved with the Cornish band the Onyx who under his guidance changed their name to Vineyard and released two singles on Decca and Deram in 1974. Later he made a brief foray in acting, appearing in the 1977 sex comedy, Come Play With Me. The film was directed by his neighbour, George Harrison Marks. In the 1980s, Lordan remarried and started to write again, although his songs were never published.

== Personal life ==
Lordan's first marriage was in 1963 to Petrina Forsyth who (credited as Petrina Lordan) wrote the Shadows hit "A Place in the Sun" (1966) and also, with Hank Marvin, "Love, Truth and Emily Stone" for Cliff Richard on his album Tracks 'n Grooves (1970). His second marriage was to Claudine Albus/Hammerschmidt in 1980.

== Death ==
Lordan died on 24 July 1995 in Shrewsbury Hospital, Shropshire, from acute renal failure, aged 61. A memorial service was held for him at St Martin-in-the-Fields on 25 October 1995, which was attended by Bruce Welch of the Shadows.
