= Joe Moretti =

Scottish guitarist (1938–2012)

- Born: Joseph Edward Moretti; 10 May 1938; Glasgow, Strathclyde, Scotland
- Died: 9 February 2012 (aged 73) Johannesburg, South Africa
- Genres: Pop, skiffle, rock
- Occupations: Guitarist, songwriter
- Instrument: Guitar
- Years active: 1960s–1970s
- Website: www.joemoretti.org

Joseph Edward Moretti (10 May 1938 – 9 February 2012) was a Scottish guitarist and songwriter, renowned for his work on seminal UK rock and roll records such as Vince Taylor's "Brand New Cadillac" and Johnny Kidd & the Pirates' "Shakin' All Over", and later for his work as a session musician. He also worked with Gene Vincent, Vince Eager, Lesley Duncan, Nero and the Gladiators, Ronnie Jones and The Nightimers, Eddie Calvert, Johnny Duncan's Bluegrass Boys, Tom Jones, Colin Hicks & The Cabin Boys, Chris Farlowe, and Madeline Bell.

== Life and career ==
Moretti was born in Glasgow in 1938, to an Irish mother and an Italian Scottish father. He moved to London in November 1958 with his wife Pina, and instantly became part of the burgeoning rock and roll scene based around The 2i's Coffee Bar in Soho. There he found opportunities backing up singers such as Gene Vincent, Vince Eager, Colin Hicks & The Cabin Boys and other skiffle acts and nascent rock n' roll outfits.

It was in early 1959, that Moretti discovered guitarist-singer Tony Sheridan had quit Vince Taylor's band, The Playboys, and was asked to take his place. Moretti toured with Taylor in the UK and cut "Brand New Cadillac" in the spring of 1959. Shortly after, Moretti left the band to take up with Johnny Duncan's Bluegrass Boys. The following year, 1960, Moretti was to play guitar on another session after being called into the studio by Johnny Kidd & the Pirates' guitarist Alan Caddy to play leads on two songs: UK number one single "Shakin' All Over" and its follow-up "Restless". It was Moretti who created the special signature sound to "Shakin' All Over" by sliding a cigarette lighter up and down the fret-board of his guitar.

During the 1970s, Moretti was part of Madeline Bell's backing band.

=== Session work and uncredited appearances ===
Throughout the 1960s Moretti continued to tour and record with artists such as Nero and the Gladiators, Ronnie Jones and The Nightimers and Eddie Calvert. In addition, Moretti was in demand as a session musician and, along with other UK guitarists such as Big Jim Sullivan, future Led Zeppelin guitarist Jimmy Page and Vic Flick, often played guitar at a recording date without being credited. Moretti claims to have played guitar on hits for Jet Harris and Tony Meehan ("Scarlet O'Hara" and "Applejack") and Donovan's hit record "Mellow Yellow".

It is now accepted that he played guitar on at least two more UK number one records: Tom Jones' "It's Not Unusual" and Chris Farlowe's Rolling Stones cover "Out of Time".

=== Later work ===
Moretti settled in South Africa, in the late 1970s. He worked as house musician at a Sun City casino. He contributed to a 1994 Sonoton album called Authentic Africa, featured alongside Dizu Plaatjies and Amampondo.

== Death ==
Moretti died from lung cancer in Johannesburg in February 2012, aged 73.

== Partial discography ==
=== Singles ===
- "Pledgin' My Love"/"Brand New Cadillac" - Vince Taylor and his Playboys (April 1959)
- "Shakin' All Over"/"Yes Sir, That's My Baby" - Johnny Kidd & the Pirates (August 1960)
- "In the Hall of the Mountain King" - Nero and the Gladiators (July 1961)
- "It's Not Unusual" - Tom Jones (January 1965)
- "Snakes and Snails" - Alma Cogan (July 1965)
- "Out of Time" - Chris Farlowe (June 1966)
- "Aggravation" - Chris Curtis (June 1966)

=== Albums ===
- Own Up - Twice as Much (1966)
- Oscillation 67! - The Leading Figures (1967)
- Don Partridge - Don Partridge (1968)
- Would You Believe - Billy Nicholls (1968)
- Pick Up a Bone - Rupert Hine (1971)
- Sing Children Sing - Lesley Duncan (1971)
- Barbados Sky - Typically Tropical (1975)
