= Cliff Sings =

1959 studio album by Cliff Richard with The Shadows

Studio album by Cliff Richard with The Shadows
- Released: 6 November 1959
- Recorded: 7–9 September 1959
- Length: 36:10
- Labels: Columbia; 1959 Vinyl – SX1192 (mono); 1992 CD – 0777780417 26: 2 on 1 with "Me And My Shadows"; 1998 CD – 495 4392 (mono / stereo); 2001 CD – 5346002 (Stereo); 2 on 1 with "Cliff"
- Producer: Norrie Paramor

Cliff Richard chronology
Cliff (1959)	Cliff Sings (1959)	Me and My Shadows (1960)

Cliff Sings is the second album by Cliff Richard and his first studio album. It was released in November 1959, through EMI Columbia Records and recorded at Abbey Road Studios. It reached No. 2 in the UK Albums Chart. No singles were released from the album in the UK (as was often the case prior to the 1970s).

The album is the beginning of a repeated pattern in Richard's career until the mid-1960s, in which the Shadows and the Norrie Paramor orchestra would alternately share backing duties. The back cover of the album states that it was at the suggestion of the album's recording engineer, Malcolm Addey, that influenced Norrie Paramor to alternate Richard's backing between the Shadows and the string orchestra for this album. Tony Meehan from the Shadows was the session drummer for all tracks backed by the orchestra on this album.

While backing duties were shared equally on this album, Richard's next album, Me and My Shadows, just featured Cliff backed by The Shadows on all songs.

Cliff Sings was recorded in both stereo and mono but originally only released in mono on LP. From February 1960, the album was also progressively marketed on the EP format, into four EPs, Cliff Sings No.1 through to Cliff Sings No.4, in both mono and stereo.

== Track listing ==
Side one
No.	Title	Writer(s)	With	Length
1.	"Blue Suede Shoes"	Carl Perkins	The Shadows	1:45
2.	"The Snake and the Bookworm"	Doc Pomus, Mort Shuman	The Shadows	2:10
3.	"I Gotta Know"	Matt Williams, Paul Evans	The Shadows	2:25
4.	"Here Comes Summer"	Jerry Keller	The Shadows	2:15
5.	"I'll String Along With You"	Al Dubin, Harry Warren	The Norrie Paramor Orchestra	2:19
6.	"Embraceable You"	George Gershwin, Ira Gershwin	The Norrie Paramor Orchestra	2:37
7.	"As Time Goes By"	Herman Hupfeld	The Norrie Paramor Orchestra	2:25
8.	"The Touch of Your Lips"	Ray Noble	The Norrie Paramor Orchestra	2:46

Side two
No.	Title	Writer(s)	With	Length
1.	"Twenty Flight Rock"	Ned Fairchild, Eddie Cochran	The Shadows	1:43
2.	"Pointed Toe Shoes"	Carl Perkins	The Shadows	1:50
3.	"Mean Woman Blues"	Claude Demetrius	The Shadows	2:26
4.	"I'm Walkin'"	Fats Domino, Dave Bartholomew	The Shadows	1:49
5.	"I Don't Know Why (I Just Do)"	Roy Turk, Fred E. Ahlert	The Norrie Paramor Orchestra	1:56
6.	"Little Things Mean a Lot"	Carl Stutz, Edith Lindeman	The Norrie Paramor Orchestra	2:32
7.	"Somewhere Along the Way"	Sammy Gallop, Kurt Adams	The Norrie Paramor Orchestra	2:37
8.	"That's My Desire"	Helmy Kresa, Carroll Loveday	The Norrie Paramor Orchestra	2:35

== Release formats ==
- Vinyl LP mono
- Reel to Reel Tape.(?)
- CD mono
- CD mono/stereo

== Personnel ==
Cliff Richard and the Shadows

- Cliff Richard – lead vocals
- Hank Marvin – lead guitar
- Bruce Welch – rhythm guitar
- Jet Harris – bass guitar
- Tony Meehan – drums

Production

- Produced by Norrie Paramor
- Engineered by Malcolm Addey
