= Me and My Shadows =

1960 studio album by Cliff Richard and The Shadows

Studio album by Cliff Richard and The Shadows
- Released: 7 October 1960
- Recorded: September 1959, March 1960
- Length: 37:46
- Label: Columbia; 1960 LP - SX1261 (mono); 1960 LP - SCX 3330 (stereo); 1992 CD - 0777780417 26: 2 on 1 with "Cliff Sings"; 1998 CD - 495 4440 (mono / stereo); 2001 CD - 5347002 (Stereo); 2 on 1 with "Listen to Cliff"
- Producer: Norrie Paramor

Cliff Richard and The Shadows chronology
Cliff Sings (1959)	Me and My Shadows (1960)	Listen to Cliff! (1961)

Me and My Shadows is the second studio album by singer Cliff Richard and third album overall. Recorded with The Shadows and produced by Norrie Paramor, it was released through Columbia Records in October 1960 and reached No. 2 in the UK album chart. The album was recorded at Abbey Road Studios.

No singles were to be officially released in the UK from the album. A pairing of album tracks "Gee Whizz It's You" and "I Cannot Find a True Love" was pressed as an export single intended for continental Europe but high demand in the UK meant it charted in March 1961 and eventually reached #4 in the UK singles chart. Although very popular for an import, this single broke what would have been a run of 15 consecutive top 3 singles in the UK, although it helped give Richard a record 16 back to back top 5 hits.

This album is the 2nd of only 5 albums [Cliff, Me & My Shadows, 21 Today, Finders Keepers, Established 1958] recorded by Richard with exclusive backing by the Shadows during the 1960s. All the others the backing duties are shared between The Shadows and the Norrie Paramor Orchestra.

This album was then re-marketed on the EP format into 3 EPs in mono only, Me and My Shadows no.1, Me and My Shadows no.2 and Me and My Shadows no.3.

== Track listing ==
Side one
No.	Title	Writer(s)	Length
1.	"I'm Gonna Get You"	Jet Harris, Hank Marvin	1:53
2.	"You and I"	Hank Marvin, Bruce Welch	1:54
3.	"I Cannot Find a True Love"	Ian Samwell	2:34
4.	"Evergreen Tree"	Wally Gold, Aaron Schroeder	2:40
5.	"She's Gone"	Jet Harris, Hank Marvin	2:34
6.	"Left Out Again"	Pete Chester	3:00
7.	"You're Just the One to Do It"	Otis Blackwell	2:24
8.	"Lamp of Love"	Sid Tepper	1:49

Side two
No.	Title	Writer(s)	Length
1.	"Choppin' 'n' Changin'"	Ian Samwell	2:32
2.	"We Have It Made"	Sugar Hall	2:17
3.	"Tell Me"	Pete Chester, Bruce Welch	2:37
4.	"Gee Whizz It's You"	Ian Samwell, Hank Marvin	2:08
5.	"I Love You So"	Jet Harris, Cliff Richard	3:07
6.	"I'm Willing to Learn"	Ben Weisman, Fred Wise	1:58
7.	"I Don't Know"	Ian Samwell	2:10
8.	"Working After School"	Vic Abrams	2:09

== Release formats ==
- Vinyl LP mono & stereo.
- Reel to Reel Tape.(?) mono.
- Cassette.(stereo)
- CD mono
- CD mono/stereo

== Personnel ==
Cliff Richard and the Shadows

- Cliff Richard – lead vocals
- Hank Marvin – lead guitar
- Bruce Welch – rhythm guitar
- Jet Harris – bass guitar
- Tony Meehan – drums

Production

- Produced by Norrie Paramor
- Engineered by Malcolm Addey
