= Club Pop House =

Private teenage club in Beloit, Wisconsin, US

- Interactive map of Club Pop House
- Address: 154-158 Portland Avenue
- Location: Beloit, Wisconsin
- Coordinates: 42°30′26″N 89°02′18″W

Construction
- Opened: 1946
- Renovated: 1954
- Expanded: 1958; 1964
- Closed: 1973

Club Pop House (called The Pop House) was a private teenage social and dance club located near downtown Beloit, Wisconsin, United States, at the intersection of Portland Avenue and 5th Street. The Pop House was a popular gathering spot for local high school and college students from 1946 until it closed in 1973. It was owned and operated by George Stankewitz, son of Lithuanian immigrants and a decorated World War II veteran.

For dancing, the Pop House scheduled record hops and live music on weekends. It was host to many regional bands and a number of major musical acts including Conway Twitty, Bobby Vinton, Tommy Roe, Jimmy Gilmer and The Fireballs, Freddy Cannon, Johnny Tillotson, Paul and Paula, The Kingsmen, Bobby Goldsboro, and Del Shannon among others. A jukebox stocked with the latest hit records also was available.

Social activities included top athletic teams in softball and basketball. An annual event, the Chili Festival in late fall featured election of a presiding "Chili Queen". Each spring brought the coronation of a "Softball Queen".

The Pop House offered a lunch counter with hamburgers, French fries, pizza and soft drinks. It was noted for its specialty sandwiches with such names as the Snead, 12:01, and Smiley Special.

Club Pop House was governed by an adult board of directors with established by-laws and rules of conduct. Prospective members had to be white, in the tenth grade or above and undergo a review process that included an interview with owner George Stankewitz before receiving a membership card and a key. The first African-American to receive a membership card and key was LaMont Weaver after winning the state championship with a half court shot with only seconds left for Beloit Memorial. In its heyday there were more than 600 active high school age members in a given year, a waiting list of about 100 more, and numerous "alumni". The "club" status of the Pop House was challenged in August 1965 when charges of racial bias resulted in a discrimination suit after five African-American citizens were denied service at the lunch counter. The case went to trial in November of that year and a jury cleared Mr. Stankewitz of bias charges, finding that the Pop House operated as a private club and could select its own membership.

In 1972 a new eighteen-year-old drinking age law was enacted in Wisconsin. Owner Stankewitz began serving alcohol at the Pop House in November of that year, thus excluding the under-eighteen crowd. With a subsequent decline in business, Stankewitz announced his retirement and closed the Club Pop House in April 1973 after 27 years of continuous operation.
