= Ragnhild Michelsen =

Norwegian actress (1911–2000)

Ragnhild Michelsen Steen
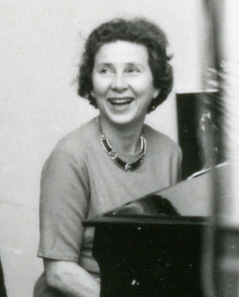
- Born: Ragnhild Michelsen; 23 June 1911; Narvik, Norway
- Died: 30 August 2000 (aged 89); Oslo
- Occupation: Actress
- Spouse: Henrik Anker Steen (m. 1971)

Ragnhild Michelsen Steen (23 June 1911 – 30 September 2000) was a Norwegian actress.

== Life ==
Ragnhild Michelsen was born in Narvik on 22 June 1911, the daughter of Carl F. Michelsen and Clara Kokmann. Her first stage experience came while attending school in Oslo; Nissen and Hegdehaugen. She made her stage debut at Søilen Teater, subsequently working at the Carl Johan Theater from 1935 to 1940 and Den Nationale Scene from 1940 to 1947. Some of her major roles were in Twelfth Night, Mary Stuart and Brand. She later worked at Folketeateret from 1952 and lastly Fjernsynsteatret from 1961 to 1981.

In 1958, she made her film debut with Arild Brinchmann's film, Ut av mørket. She was described as an "almost compulsory" participant in Norwegian films for "a number of years".

In November 1963, a political satire written by Arild Feldborg as "a pendant" to Vaughn Meader's The First Family, was published as a spoken word album. Performed by Ragnhild Michelsen and Rolf Just Nilsen, the album "Dagligliv i Folkehjemmet" sold as well as to immediately reach the top 10 on the Norwegian chart VG-lista. In December the same year, the follow-up album "Jul i Folkehjemmet" was released, joining "Dagligliv i Folkehjemmet" in the top 10. Michelsen retired in 1981, but still featured in select films until 1990.

== Filmography ==
- 1958: Ut av mørket
- 1958: Folkehjemmet
- 1960: Det store varpet
- 1963: Freske fraspark
- 1963: Elskere
- 1966: Afrikaneren
- 1967: Det største spillet
- 1968: Skipper Worse
- 1974: Crash
- 1974: Rallarblod
- 1974: Kimen
- 1975: En gutt som Jan
- 1975: Streik!
- 1987: Over grensen
- 1990: Til en ukjent
