= Diamonds (instrumental) =

1963 single by Jet Harris and Tony Meehan

Single by Jet Harris and Tony Meehan
- B-side: "Footstomp"
- Released: 4 January 1963
- Recorded: 23 November 1962
- Studio: Decca Studios, London
- Genre: Instrumental rock
- Length: 2:25
- Label: Decca
- Songwriter(s): Jerry Lordan
- Producer(s): Tony Meehan

Jet Harris and Tony Meehan singles chronology
"Diamonds" (1963)	"Scarlett O'Hara" (1963)

"Diamonds" is an instrumental composed by Jerry Lordan and first released as a single by Jet Harris and Tony Meehan in January 1963. It became a number-one hit on the UK Singles Chart, spending three weeks at the top of the chart.

== Background and release ==
In 1962, guitarist Jet Harris left the Shadows and was signed to Decca Records as a solo artist, releasing his debut hit single "Besame Mucho" in May 1962. Former Shadows' drummer Tony Meehan was working at Decca as a producer and suggested to Harris that they team up. He asked Jerry Lordan, writer of several hits for the Shadows ("Apache", "Wonderful Land" and "Atlantis"), for an instrumental with bass guitar and a drum solo, and he gave them "Diamonds".

"Diamonds" was recorded on 23 November 1962 at Decca Studios. Harris detuned a Fender Jaguar electric guitar in order to hit much lower notes than an ordinary guitar. The recording session was the first to feature Jimmy Page, who played rhythm on an acoustic guitar. It also features bass guitar by John Paul Jones, who along with Page would go onto form Led Zeppelin.

It was released at the beginning of January 1963 with the B-side "Footstomp", written by Meehan. "Footstomp" features lead vocals by Harris and harmony vocals by Meehan. It also features Joe Moretti on acoustic rhythm guitar, who would also play lead guitar on "Scarlett O'Hara" and "Applejack".

== Track listing ==
7": Decca / F 11563

1. "Diamonds" – 2:25
2. "Footstomp" – 2:49

== Personnel ==
- Jet Harris – electric lead guitar
- Tony Meehan – drums
- Jimmy Page – acoustic rhythm guitar
- John Paul Jones – electric bass guitar
- Glenn and Chris Hughes – baritone saxophone, tenor saxophone, piano

== Charts ==
Chart (1963)	Peak position
Australia (Kent Music Report)	14
Canada (CHUM)	22
Denmark (Danmarks Radio)	18
Ireland (IRMA)	1
New Zealand (Lever Hit Parade)	2
Norway (VG-lista)	3
Sweden (Kvällstoppen)	14
UK Singles (OCC)	1

== Other versions ==
- In May 1963, the Ventures recorded it for their Surfin' album.
- The Shadows, without their former members Harris and Meehan, recorded "Diamonds" in 1983.
