= Åse Wentzel =

Norwegian singer

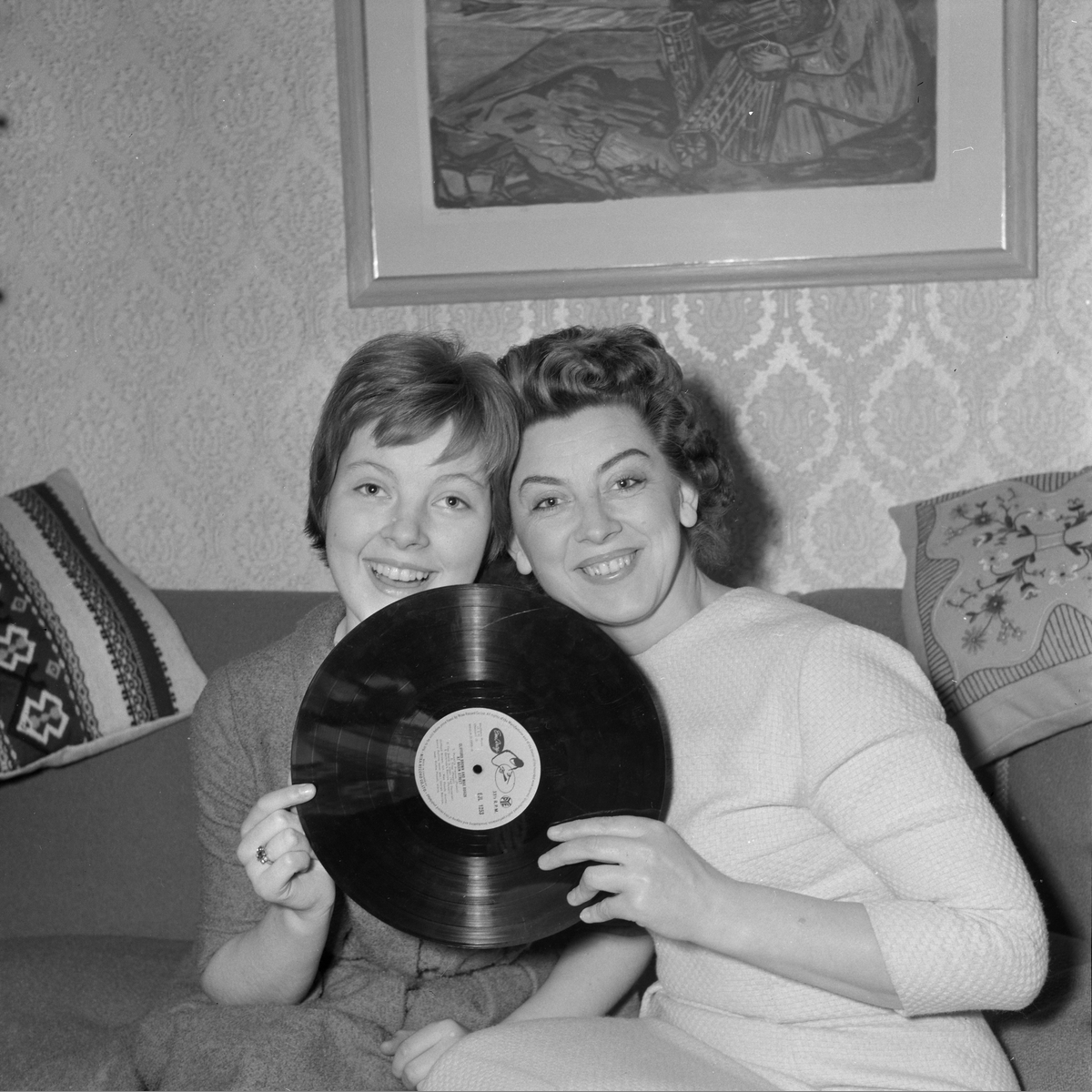
Magni and Åse Wentzel, 1959.

Åse Carola Wentzel Larsen, née Helmersen (2 January 1924 – 30 August 2009) was a Norwegian pop singer.

She was born in Trondheim as a daughter of Henry Helmersen (1895–1932) and Magnhild Sørum (1897–1943). In 1943 she married violinist Odd Wentzel Larsen (1919–1988). They had the daughter Magni Wentzel.

She was a well-known schlager singer in the 1950s and 1960s, with hits such as "Domino" (1951), "Du, du, du" (1953), "Vaya Con Dios" (1953 with Thor Raymond) and "Midnattstango" (1963 with Jan Høiland). The latter reached #1 on the singles chart VG-lista 1963. She died in August 2009. She received a Gammleng Award in 1985.
