= Shazam! (Duane Eddy song) =

Single by Duane Eddy
- B-side: "The Secret Seven"
- Released: February 1960
- Genre: Instrumental rock, rockabilly
- Length: 2:04
- Label: Jamie Records 1151
- Songwriter(s): Duane Eddy, Lee Hazlewood

Duane Eddy singles chronology
"Bonnie Came Back" (1959)	"Shazam!" (1960)	"Because They're Young" (1960)

"Shazam!" is a song written by Duane Eddy and Lee Hazlewood and performed by Eddy. It reached No. 4 on the UK Singles Chart, No. 26 in Canada, and No. 45 on the Billboard Hot 100 in 1960.

== Other versions ==
- The Shadows released a version of the song in 1963 as the B-side to their single "Geronimo".
