= Nero and the Gladiators =

British instrumental rock and roll band

- Genres: Rock
- Years active: 1960–1964; 1991–2005
- Labels: Decca, His Master's Voice
- Past members: Mike O'Neill (aka "Nero"); Rod "Boots" Slade; Colin Green; Laurie Jay; Joe Moretti; Tommy Brown; Diz Disley; Jim Cannon; Mick Jones; Alan Bugby; Ralph Danks

Nero & the Gladiators were a British instrumental rock and roll band in the early 1960s. The group was led by keyboard player Mike O'Neill as "Nero", and had two minor hits in the UK, "Entry of the Gladiators" and "In the Hall of the Mountain King".

O'Neill (born Michael Anthony O'Neill, 8 July 1938 – 10 October 2013) was born in Lowton, Lancashire, and moved to London in 1958. He played in Vince Taylor's band before joining The Cabin Boys, who backed singer Colin Hicks, the younger brother of Tommy Steele. In 1959, Hicks and his band accepted an offer to tour Italy, where they had a hit with a version of "Giddy Up a Ding Dong" and appeared in a movie, Europa di Notte. At the end of the tour, Hicks opted to remain in Italy, and his backing band returned to Britain. Before they left, however, O'Neill and the group's bass player, Rod "Boots" Slade, obtained several sets of gladiator costumes, largely made of plastic, which had been used in the 1951 movie, Quo Vadis, filmed at the Cinecittà studios in Rome.

Returning to Britain, O'Neill and Slade formed a new group, Nero & the Gladiators, with guitarist Colin Green and drummer Laurie Jay (born Lawrence Ernest Joseph, 1941, South Tottenham, North London). Green had been introduced to O'Neill by another young Leigh musician trying to make his way in London at the time, Georgie Fame, who had played with Green in Billy Fury's backing band. The group performed in their gladiator costumes, with "Nero" wearing a toga and a laurel wreath crown. They won a contract with Decca Records, and recorded a rocked-up version of Julius Fučík's well known circus music tune, "Entry of the Gladiators", with a spoken introduction by Slade: "Hey, say there, Brutus, man, like, here come the gladiators..." It entered the UK Singles Chart in March 1961, rising to No. 37, and was later adopted as the theme tune of Leigh rugby league club. The follow-up, "In the Hall of the Mountain King", by Edvard Grieg, reached No. 48 on the chart, with guitarist Joe Moretti having replaced Green who had joined Georgie Fame's Blue Flames. It was not broadcast on BBC radio, because of the Corporation's policy, initiated by Sir Arthur Bliss, of banning pop versions of classical tunes. They only released two more singles, "Czardas" (1961) and "Tovaritch" (on His Master's Voice, 1963).

Laurie Jay left in 1961 to form his own group The Echoes, being replaced by Tommy Brown, and O'Neill and Slade kept the group together until late 1962 with a succession of guitarists including Diz Disley. After the group supported the Beatles at the Cavern Club, Slade also left to join the Blue Flames, being replaced on bass by Jim Cannon. For a period in 1963, the position as the group's guitarist was filled by 18-year-old Mick Jones, later of Spooky Tooth and Foreigner. Cannon and Jones were later replaced by Alan Bugby and Ralph Danks, before the group disbanded after a tour of France in early 1964.

Mike O'Neill later played in various bands including The John Barry Seven, The Ivy League, The Echoes and Head Hands & Feet. "Boots" Slade became a member of The Alan Price Set. Colin Green later became musical director for Shirley Bassey.

In 1991, O'Neill and Green re-formed Nero & the Gladiators to play in oldies shows. In 1993, the band performed at the Pipeline Instrumental Rock Convention in London, and again in 1995, and 2000. They continued to perform, with various other non-original band members, until 2005.

Rod "Boots" Slade born 3 September 1941, Weston-super-Mare died at the age of 71 on 3 May 2013 in Murcia, Spain. Mike O'Neill died on 10 October 2013 of liver cancer. Laurie Jay died on 5 March 2017.

== Discography ==
=== Singles ===
Year	Single	Chart Positions
Year	Single	UK
1961	"Entry of the Gladiators"	37
1961	"In the Hall of the Mountain King"	48
1961	"Czardas"	-
1963	"Tovaritch"	-
