= Geronimo (The Shadows song) =

1963 single by the Shadows

Single by The Shadows
- B-side: "Shazam"
- Released: 29 November 1963
- Recorded: 13 December 1962
- Studio: EMI Studios, London
- Genre: Instrumental rock
- Length: 2:19
- Label: Columbia
- Songwriter(s): Hank Marvin
- Producer(s): Norrie Paramor

The Shadows singles chronology
"Shindig" (1963)	"Geronimo" (1963)	"Theme for Young Lovers" (1964)

"Geronimo" is an instrumental by British group the Shadows, released as a single in November 1963. It peaked at number 11 on the UK Singles Chart.

== Release and reception ==
"Geronimo" was written by the Shadows' Hank Marvin and was released with the B-side "Shazam", originally recorded by Duane Eddy in 1960. "Geronimo" was recorded at EMI Studios (later renamed Abbey Road) in December 1962; "Shazam" was recorded at the Jubilee Theatre in Blackpool in August 1963 whilst the group were on tour.

Reviewed in Record Mirror, "Geronimo" was described as having "an "Apache" beat in the background, and the whole thing moves along smoothly. Maybe not up to the standard of some of their previous hits, but cleverly played, and with a driving beat. Norrie Paramor string and choral backing. But we don't reckon this'll do so well as most of theirs". For Disc, Don Nicholl wrote that it "gallops along well in the spirit of its Red Indian title" and that it is "a good production that ought to do at least as well as "Shindig".

== Track listing ==
7": Columbia / DB 7163

1. "Geronimo" – 2:19
2. "Shazam" – 2:18

== Personnel ==
- Hank Marvin – electric lead guitar, multi-tracked electric lead guitar
- Bruce Welch – acoustic rhythm guitar
- Brian "Licorice" Locking – electric bass guitar
- Brian Bennett – drums
- Norrie Paramor Strings – all other instrumentation

== Charts ==
Chart (1963–64)	Peak position
Australia (Kent Music Report)	8
Canada (Vancouver CFUN)	28
Hong Kong	4
Ireland (Evening Herald)	8
Netherlands (Single Top 100)	29
Norway (VG-lista)	10
Spain (Promusicae)	18
UK Singles (OCC)	11
