= Scarlett O'Hara (instrumental) =

1963 single by Jet Harris and Tony Meehan

Single by Jet Harris and Tony Meehan
- B-side: "(Doing The) Hully Gully"
- Released: 19 April 1963
- Recorded: 15 March 1963
- Studio: Decca Studios, London
- Genre: Instrumental rock
- Length: 2:18
- Label: Decca
- Songwriter: Jerry Lordan
- Producer: Tony Meehan

Jet Harris and Tony Meehan singles chronology
"Diamonds" (1963)	"Scarlett O'Hara" (1963)	"Applejack" (1963)

"Scarlett O'Hara" (also spelt "Scarlet O'Hara") is an instrumental composed by Jerry Lordan, first released as a single in April 1963 by Jet Harris and Tony Meehan. It peaked at number 2 on the UK Singles Chart.

== Recording and release ==
"Scarlett O'Hara", named after the fictional character from the novel Gone with the Wind, was recorded at Decca Studios in March 1963. The recording did not actually feature Jet Harris; instead Joe Moretti plays the lead guitar. It was released as a single with the B-side "(Doing The) Hully Gully", written by Meehan and John Rodgers, featured in the film Just for Fun.

== Track listing ==
7": Decca / F 11644

1. "Scarlet O'Hara" – 2:18
2. "(Doing The) Hully Gully" – 1:50

== Personnel ==
- Tony Meehan – drums
- Joe Moretti – electric lead bass guitar
- John Paul Jones – electric bass guitar
- Glenn and Chris Hughes – brass

There is also acoustic rhythm guitar, strings and backing vocals by unknown musicians

== Charts ==
Chart (1963)	Peak position
Australia (Kent Music Report)	30
Australia (Music Maker)	12
Ireland (IRMA)	7
Israel (Kol Israel)	5
New Zealand (Lever Hit Parade)	4
Sweden (Kvällstoppen)	14
UK Singles (OCC)	2

== Lawrence Welk version ==
"Scarlett O'Hara"

Single by Lawrence Welk and His Orchestra

from the album Scarlett O'Hara
- B-side: "Breakwater"
- Released: May 1963
- Genre: Instrumental pop
- Length: 2:03
- Label: Dot
- Songwriter: Jerry Lordan
- Producers: George Cates; Lawrence Welk; Randy Wood

Lawrence Welk and His Orchestra singles chronology
"Baby Elephant Walk" (1962)	"Scarlett O'Hara" (1963)	"Walk Right In" (1963)

American musician and bandleader Lawrence Welk released a cover of the song as a single in May 1963 which peaked at number 89 on the Billboard Hot 100. "Scarlett O'Hara" was the lead song of an album by the same name released by Lawrence Welk and His Orchestra in 1963, which spent 27 weeks on Billboard's chart of Top LPs, peaking at No. 33.

=== Track listing ===
7": Dot / 45-16488

1. "Scarlet O'Hara" – 2:03
2. "Breakwater" – 2:15

7": Dot / D 336 (Denmark)

1. "Scarlet O'Hara" – 2:03
2. "Ruby" – 2:20

=== Charts ===
Chart (1963)	Peak position
Canada (CHUM)	17
Hong Kong	10
US Billboard Hot 100	89

== Other versions ==
- In May 1963, American musician Bobby Gregg also released a version of the tune. It peaked at number 112 on the Billboard Bubbling Under the Hot 100.
