= The Folk Singer (Tommy Roe song) =

Single by Tommy Roe

from the album Sweet Pea
- B-side: "Count on Me"
- Released: March 1963
- Genre: Pop
- Length: 2:51
- Label: ABC Records 10423
- Songwriter: Merle Kilgore
- Producer: Felton Jarvis

Tommy Roe singles chronology
| "Gonna Take a Chance" (1963) | "The Folk Singer" (1963) | "Kiss and Run" (1963) |

"The Folk Singer" is a song written by Merle Kilgore and performed by Tommy Roe. It reached number 4 in the United Kingdom, number 20 in Australia, number 34 in Canada, and number 84 on the Billboard Hot 100 in 1963. It was later featured on his 1966 album, Sweet Pea.

The song was produced by Felton Jarvis.
