= Applejack (song) =

1963 single by Jet Harris and Tony Meehan

Single by Jet Harris and Tony Meehan
- B-side: "The Tall Texan"
- Released: 30 August 1963
- Recorded: 24 July 1963
- Studio: Decca Studios, London
- Genre: Instrumental rock
- Length: 2:05
- Label: Columbia
- Songwriter(s): Les Vandyke; Bridget de Mare
- Producer(s): Tony Meehan

Jet Harris and Tony Meehan singles chronology
"Scarlett O'Hara" (1963)	"Applejack" (1963)

"Applejack" is an instrumental by Jet Harris and Tony Meehan, released as a single in August 1963. It peaked at number 4 on the UK Singles Chart.

== Background and release ==
"Applejack" was written by Les Vandyke and Meehan's then-wife Bridget de Mare. It was Vandyke's only instrumental hit. Along with the B-side "The Tall Texan", written by Meehan, it was recorded at Decca Studios in July 1963. Neither side feature Harris playing, who was suffering from health problems. Instead, like with their previous single "Scarlett O'Hara", Joe Moretti plays lead guitar. Because of the success of "Diamonds", which Harris played on, Decca kept Harris name on the follow-up records in order to help them sell.

In September 1963, Harris was involved in a car accident, with his chauffeur-driven limousine colliding with a Midland Red bus. He was knocked unconscious and suffered severe head injuries. The accident also made public the fact that Harris was having an affair with singer Billie Davis, who was with him in the limousine. However, with "Applejack" climbing up the charts, Harris and Meehan had been booked to perform on Ready Steady Go!. Their manager still wanted them to perform, but Harris was still suffering shock from the accident and after turning up for a pre-show rehearsal and doing a run-through, he took off, leaving Meehan to do the show by himself. Harris was later found hiding in Brighton on the verge of a nervous breakdown. Whilst Harris and Meehan did not release anymore singles together, the band that had actually played on "Scarlett O'Hara" and "Applejack" would go on to release one further single, "Son of Mexico", solely under Meehan's name, which peaked at number 39 on the charts. Harris would go on to record another single, "Big Bad Bass", as a comeback in early 1964, but it failed to chart.

== Track listing ==
7": Decca / F 11710

1. "Applejack" – 2:05
2. "The Tall Texan" – 2:16

== Personnel ==
- Tony Meehan – drums, tambourine, triangle
- Joe Moretti – acoustic lead guitar
- John Paul Jones – electric bass guitar
- Glenn and Chris Hughes – baritone saxophone, tenor saxophone, brass, piano

There is also acoustic rhythm guitar and backing vocals by unknown musicians

== Charts ==
Chart (1963)	Peak position
Australia (Kent Music Report)	16
Ireland (IRMA)	5
UK Singles (OCC)	4
