= Colin Hicks & The Cabin Boys =

British rock and roll band

- Origin: England
- Genres: Beat; rock and roll; rock
- Years active: 1950s
- Labels: Pye, Broadway International
- Past members: Colin Hicks; Jimmie Nicol; Ronnie Mills; Mike O'Neill; Dave 'Zom' Tick; Rod 'Boots' Slade

Colin Hicks & The Cabin Boys were a British rock and roll band, led by Colin Hicks, the younger brother of singer Tommy Steele.

== Career ==
In November 1957, the British music magazine NME reported that Steele's manager, Larry Parnes, had signed up Hicks, and that Hicks would undertake a ten-week variety tour with Marty Wilde. In March the following year, the same source stated that Hicks and Wilde were fulfilling contracted dates left after Terry Dene had been diagnosed as unfit to continue touring. In 1958 they made some television appearances, gained a recording contract with Pye Records, and released a few singles with the label. However, Hicks did not achieve the same level of success as his brother.

In 1959, the group appeared in the Italian film Europe By Night, with the song "Giddy Up a Ding Dong", which became a hit for them in Italy and resulted in an invitation to tour there. They became popular in Italy and recorded several singles for the Italian Broadway label.

In the early 1960s just before a concert in Turin, Hicks became ill and lost his voice, and his backing group at the time, consisting of Shel Shapiro, Johnny Charlton, Bobby Posner and Mike Shepstone, were persuaded by a manager in Italy to sever ties with Hicks, which they did. They then became The Rokes, and started playing behind the Italian female singer Rita Pavone. However, they were signed to RCA Italiana on their own and debuted with a single, a cover version of "Shake, Rattle and Roll".

They hold the distinction of being the first foreign rock band to play in a socialist state (in Yugoslavia in 1960). In 2020, Bear Family Records issued a compilation of recordings by Hicks.

== Former personnel ==
- Colin Hicks – vocals (born February 1941, Cornwall)
- Jimmie Nicol – drums (born James George Nicol, 3 August 1939, Barnes, South West London)
- Mike Elliott – saxophone (born 6 August 1929, Jamaica)
- Mike O'Neill – piano (born Michael Anthony O'Neill, 8 July 1938, Lowton, Lancashire; died 10 October 2013, Stevenage, Hertfordshire)
- Ronnie Mills – Piano – toured Italy – European Nights (born 5 February 1938, Glasgow)
- Dave 'Zom' Tick – lead guitar (born 1938)
- Rod 'Boots' Slade – bass guitar (born 3 September 1941, Weston-super-Mare, Somerset; died 3 May 2013, Murcia, Spain)
- Brian Gregg – bass guitar (born 31 January 1939, North London) (1960–1961)
- Shel Shapiro – guitar, vocals (born Norman David Shapiro, 16 August 1943, Stanmore, Middlesex)
- Johnny Charlton – guitar, vocals (born Raymond John Charlton, 3 April 1945, Walthamstow, east London)
- Bobby Posner – bass, vocals (born Martin Robert Posner, 6 May 1945, Edgware, Middlesex)
- Mike Shepstone – drums, vocals (born Michael James Roger Shepstone, 29 March 1943, Weymouth, Dorset)

One line-up of the Cabin Boys evolved into a group called Nero & the Gladiators.

== Discography ==
=== Singles ===
Pye

- "Wild Eyes And Tender Lips" / "Empty Arms Blues" – 7N 15114, November 1957
- "La Dee Dah" / "Wasteland" – Pye 7N 15125, February 1958
- "Little Boy Blue" / "Jambalaya" – Pye 7N 15163, November 1958

Broadway International

- Europa Di Notte (EP : "Iea-Iea" / "Oh, Boy!" / "Book of Love" / "20 Flight Rock" – Broadway Int. EP B-106EP
- "Brand New Cadillac" / "Tallahassee Lassie" – Broadway Int. 1022, 1959
- "Oh Boy" / "Rock & Roll Shoes" – Broadway Int. 1023
- "Giddy-Up-A Ding Dong" / "Hanging Around" – Broadway Int. 1024
- "Sexy Rock" / "Johnny B. Goode" – Broadway Int. 1028, 1959

=== Albums ===
- The History Of Rock'n'Roll
