= Young Lovers (song) =

Single by Paul & Paula

from the album Sing for Young Lovers
- B-side: "Ba-Hey-Be"
- Released: 1963
- Genre: Pop
- Length: 2:43
- Label: Philips
- Songwriters: Ray Hildebrand, Jill Jackson
- Producer: Shelby Singleton

Paul & Paula singles chronology
| "Hey Paula" (1962) | "Young Lovers" (1963) | "First Quarrel" (1964) |

"Young Lovers" is a song written by Ray Hildebrand and Jill Jackson, and performed under the name Paul & Paula. It was the follow-up to their number-one hit, "Hey Paula".

== Chart performance ==
The song reached number six on the Billboard Pop Singles chart in 1963, as well as number fourteen on the Hot R&B Singles chart. It reached number nine in both Canada (CHUM Chart) and the United Kingdom.
