= Hey Paula (song) =

Single by Paul & Paula

from the album Sing for Young Lovers
- B-side: "Bobby Is the One"
- Released: 1962
- Recorded: 1962
- Genre: Pop
- Length: 2:27
- Label: Le Cam, Philips (US); Sparton (Canada)
- Songwriter: Ray Hildebrand
- Producers: Major Bill Smith; Marvin "Smokey" Montgomery

Paul & Paula singles chronology
"Hey Paula" (1962)	"Young Lovers" (1963)

"Hey Paula" is an American love song recorded by the pop singing duo Paul & Paula in 1962. Released as a single, it hit number one on the Billboard Hot 100 in the week ending February 9, 1963, and also made it to number one on the Hot R&B Singles chart, and number one on Canada's CHUM Chart for three weeks. "Paul" was the song's writer, Ray Hildebrand, a student at Texas' Howard Payne University, a Baptist institution in the city of Brownwood. "Paula" was Jill Jackson, the niece of the owner of the boarding house where Hildebrand lived.

== Writing and recording ==
Hildebrand wrote the song, originally titled "Paul and Paula", taking inspiration from the Annette Funicello hit "Tall Paul". Hildebrand and Jackson performed the song on a local radio station and the song soon became popular enough for the duo to try to make a professional recording. They went to a studio in Fort Worth, Texas, and by chance found a producer; Major Bill Smith had studio time and musicians booked and was waiting for lead vocalist Amos Milburn to turn up. Due to Milburn not appearing, there were musicians standing around. Someone said that there were two young singers who wanted Smith to hear their songs. Paul sang the song to him while playing the guitar and Smith said to start recording.

Smith recorded their version of the song and released it on his Le Cam Records label, changing the name to "Hey Paula", credited to Jill & Ray. When the record became a success, it was picked up by the larger Philips Records, which changed the billing to Paul and Paula. Musicians on the recording included Marvin Montgomery on guitar, Guy Parnell on bass, Hargus Robbins on organ, Little Caesar on piano, and Ronnie Dawson on drums.

== Success ==
When the song was released on Philips, it hit the national charts in late 1962, reaching number one on both the pop and R&B charts in 1963. It spawned a follow-up top ten hit, "Young Lovers", and a series of other hits for the duo.

== Cover versions ==
- Australian personalities Ernie Sigley and Denise Drysdale recorded the song which was released in Australia on Festival Records. They scored a hit with it in 1974. It was certified gold in Australia in October 1974. It was the 28th biggest selling single in Australia in 1974.

== Charts ==
Chart (1962–63)	Peak position
UK Singles (OCC)	8
US Billboard Hot 100	1

== Certifications ==
Region	Certification	Certified units/sales
United States (RIAA)	Gold	1,000,000^{^}
^{^} Shipments figures based on certification alone.

== Popular culture ==
- Boon (Peter Riegert) and Katy (Karen Allen) sang it to each other while high in the 1978 film Animal House.
- Eric Forman (Topher Grace) sang the song to his girlfriend Donna Pinciotti (Laura Prepon) during a friend's party in That 70s Show.
- The song is discussed when Paul Krapence dates a woman named Paula in the Cheers season 9 episode "Rat Girl".
