= Shindig (song) =

1963 single by the Shadows

Single by The Shadows
- B-side: "It's Been a Blue Day"
- Released: 6 September 1963
- Recorded: 9 August 1963
- Studio: Jubilee Theatre, Blackpool
- Genre: Instrumental rock
- Length: 2:17
- Label: Columbia
- Songwriter(s): Hank Marvin; Bruce Welch
- Producer(s): Norrie Paramor

The Shadows singles chronology
| "Atlantis" (1963) | "Shindig" (1963) | "Geronimo" (1963) |

"Shindig" is an instrumental by British group the Shadows, released as a single in September 1963. It peaked at number 6 on the UK Singles Chart.

== Release and reception ==
Unlike the majority of the Shadows' previous singles, recorded at EMI Studios, "Shindig" was recorded at the Jubilee Theatre in Blackpool whilst the group were on tour. It was written by Hank Marvin and Bruce Welch and was released with the B-side "It's Been a Blue Day", written by Brian Bennett.

Reviewed in New Record Mirror, "Shindig" was described as a "change of pace from their last one on this very infectious number from the Shadows. Probably the best and the most different they have made for a long time. The guitar sounds are different on this one, and fast tempo is maintained throughout without any major deviations. Catchy and commercial, watch out for it at the top of the charts". Don Nicholl for Disc write that it has "something of a Western flavour to it" and that it "may lack a little of the impact of previous performances, but which should grow on you, and grow into a steady seller, too.

== Track listing ==
7": Columbia / DB 7106

1. "Shindig" – 2:17
2. "It's Been a Blue Day" – 2:02

== Personnel ==
- Hank Marvin – lead guitar
- Bruce Welch – rhythm guitar
- Brian "Licorice" Locking – electric bass guitar
- Brian Bennett – drums, tambourine

== Charts ==
| Chart (1963) | Peak position |
|---|---|
| Australia (Kent Music Report) | 10 |
| Canada (Vancouver CFUN) | 6 |
| Denmark (Danmarks Radio) | 9 |
| Hong Kong | 4 |
| Ireland (IRMA) | 7 |
| Netherlands (Single Top 100) | 24 |
| Norway (VG-lista) | 5 |
| Sweden (Kvällstoppen) | 14 |
| UK Singles (OCC) | 6 |
