= Paul & Paula =

American pop music duo

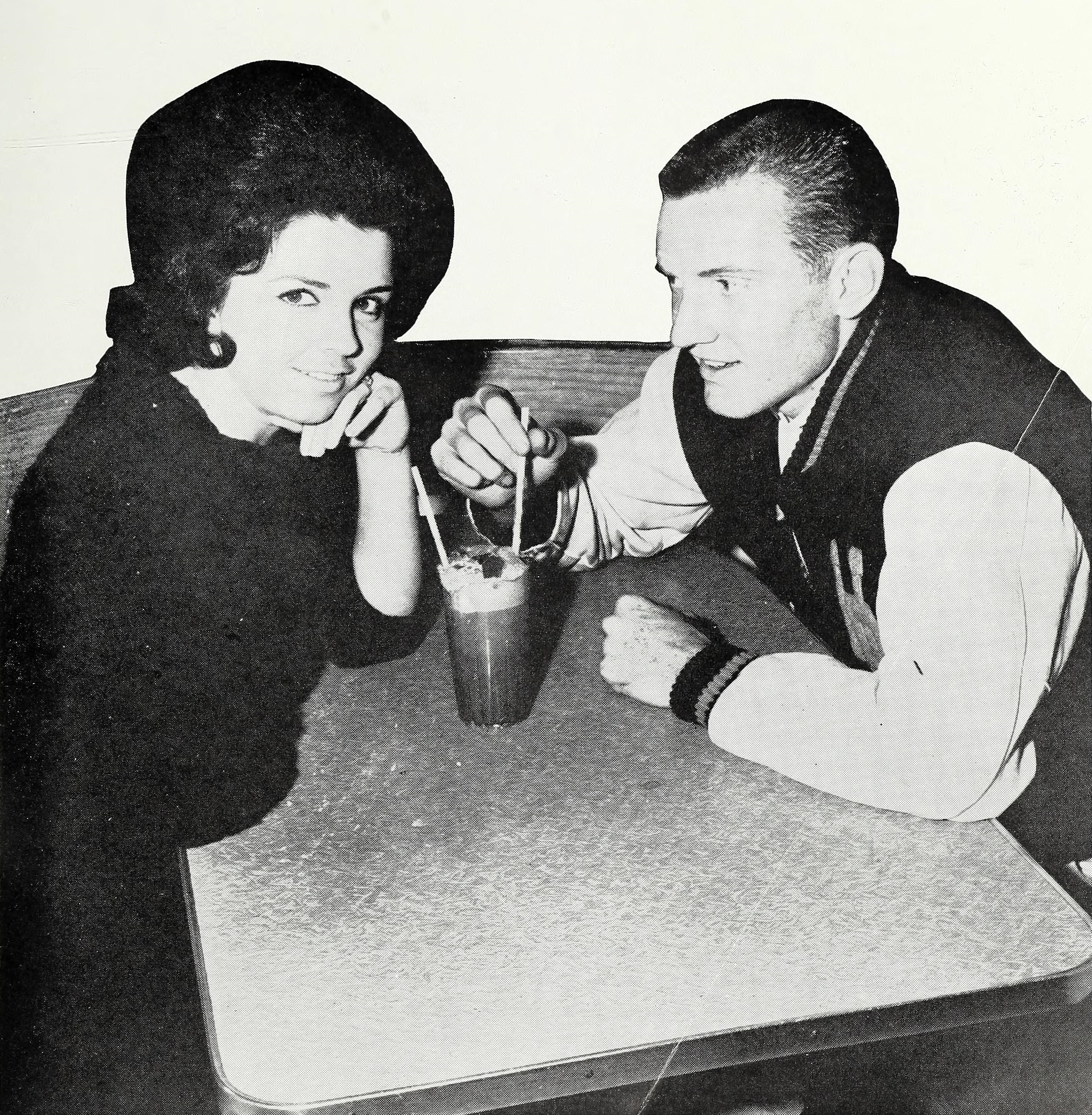
- Paul & Paula on the cover of Cash Box, 1963

Background information
- Origin: Brownwood, Texas, U.S.
- Genre: Pop
- Years active: 1962–1965
- Label: Philips

Paul & Paula, consisting of Raymond Glenn "Ray" Hildebrand (November 21, 1940 – August 18, 2023) and Jill Jackson (born May 20, 1942), were an American pop singing duo, best known for their 1962 million-selling, number-one hit record, "Hey Paula".

== Biography ==
Hildebrand was born in Joshua, Texas, and Jackson was born in McCamey, Texas. Both were attending Howard Payne College (now called Howard Payne University) in Brownwood, Texas, in 1962, when a local disc jockey, Riney Jordan, of station KEAN, asked listeners to come to the studio and sing their songs to help the American Cancer Society. The duo sang a song called "Hey Paula," which Hildebrand had written; the lyrics were inspired by a friend of his, Russell Berry, whose fiancée was named Paula. Jordan decided that Hildebrand and Jackson should record the song, and they did.

Shelby Singleton of Philips Records eventually signed the two, but not before changing their professional names; Singleton reasoned that a pair named Ray and Jill singing about "Hey, hey Paula" and "Hey, hey Paul" did not make sense. "Hey Paula" sold over two million copies globally and was awarded a gold disc by the Recording Industry Association of America in 1963.

The duo released two regular albums and a Christmas-themed album after the success of "Hey Paula", which charted at number one on the Billboard Hot 100 for three weeks in February 1963. Their follow-up, "Young Lovers", reached number six on the Billboard chart later in the same year.

In 1963, American Bandstand signed Paul & Paula to Dick Clark's Caravan of Stars national U.S. tour, which was scheduled to perform its fifteenth show on the night of November 22, 1963, at the Memorial Auditorium in Dallas, Texas, until the event was cancelled after President John F. Kennedy was assassinated in Dallas that afternoon.

In 1965, Hildebrand left the act to complete his college education, having decided that a future in show business was not for him. He made this decision in the middle of another Dick Clark Caravan of Stars road trip, and Clark had to fill in at the last minute. Hildebrand recorded a Christian music album in 1967 called He's Everything to Me. He became best known among Christian music fans for his 1970s hit song "Anybody Here Wanna Live Forever?" Subsequently, Hildebrand joined up with another Christian performer, Paul Land, and during the 1980s and 1990s, they performed comedy and Christian music under the name of Land & Hildebrand.

Jackson went on with a solo career and then married a Los Angeles businessman named Marvin Landon. After their days as a singing duo, Jill and Ray remained friends, and well into the early 2000s, they occasionally would get together to sing as Paul & Paula for special events, such as oldies shows. In 2002, Hildebrand and Jackson returned to Howard Payne University in Brownwood, Texas, where they were the homecoming guests of honor and grand marshals.

Ray Hildebrand died on August 18, 2023, at the age of 82.

== Discography ==
=== Albums ===
Year	Title	Details	Peak chart positions
Year	Title	Details	US
1963	Paul & Paula Sing for Young Lovers	Released: February 1963; Label: Philips	—
1963	We Go Together	Released: July 1963; Label: Philips	99
1963	Holiday for Teens	Released: September 1963; Label: Philips	—
1995	Hey Paula – The Best of Paul & Paula	Released: October 1995; Label: K-tel	—
1999	Greatest Hits	Released: September 1999; Label: Stardust	—
"—" denotes releases that did not chart.

=== Singles ===
Year	Title	Peak chart positions											
Year	Title	US	US R&B	AUS	BE (FLA)	BE (WA)	CAN	GER	IRE	NOR	NZ	SWE	UK
1962	"Hey Paula" (orig. under their own names, Jill & Ray) b/w "Bobby Is the One"	1	1	1	4	18	1	16	—	2	1	1	8
1963	"Young Lovers" b/w "Ba-Hey-Be"	6	14	20	18	39	9	42	10	7	—	—	9
1963	"First Quarrel" b/w "School Is Thru"	27	—	70	—	—	10	—	—	—	—	—	—
1963	"Something Old, Something New" b/w "Flipped Over You"	77; 108	—	— 19	—	—	22	—	—	—	—	—	—
1963	"First Day Back at School" b/w "A Perfect Pair"	60; 105	—	85	—	—	—	—	—	—	—	—	—
1963	"Holiday Hootenanny" b/w "Holiday for Teens"	—	—	—	—	—	—	—	—	—	—	—	—
1964	"We'll Never Break Up for Good" b/w "Crazy Little Things"	105	—	—	—	—	—	—	—	—	—	—	—
1964	"Darlin'" b/w "The Young Years"	—	—	—	—	—	—	—	—	—	—	—	—
1964	"No Other Right" b/w "Too Dark to See"	—	—	—	—	—	—	—	—	—	—	—	—
1965	"True Love" b/w "Any Way You Want Me (That's How I Will Be)"	—	—	—	—	—	—	—	—	—	—	—	—
1965	"Dear Paula" b/w "All the Love"	—	—	—	—	—	—	—	—	—	—	—	—
1966	"All I Want Is You" b/w "The Beginning of Love"	—	—	—	—	—	—	—	—	—	—	—	—
1968	"All These Things" b/w "Wedding"	—	—	—	—	—	—	—	—	—	—	—	—
1970	"Moments Like These" b/w "Mrs. Bean"	—	—	—	—	—	—	—	—	—	—	—	—
"—" denotes releases that did not chart or were not released in that territory.

== See also ==
- List of Billboard Hot 100 number ones of 1963
