= Atlantis (instrumental) =

1963 single by the Shadows

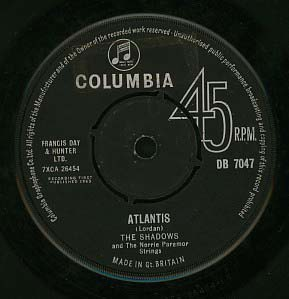

Single by The Shadows
- B-side: "I Want You to Want Me"
- Released: 31 May 1963
- Recorded: 13 December 1962
- Studio: EMI Studios, London
- Genre: Instrumental rock
- Length: 2:47
- Label: Columbia
- Songwriter(s): Jerry Lordan
- Producer(s): Norrie Paramor

The Shadows singles chronology
"Foot Tapper" (1963)	"Atlantis" (1963)	"Shindig" (1963)

"Atlantis" is a rock music instrumental by British group the Shadows, released as a single in May 1963. It spent 17 weeks on the UK Singles Chart, peaking at number two for two weeks.

== Background and reception ==
"Atlantis" was written by Jerry Lordan, who had previously written two chart-topping songs for the Shadows, "Apache" and "Wonderful Land". It was released with the B-side "I Want You to Want Me", written by Hank Marvin. Whilst the Shadows had included vocals on some of their album tracks, "I Want You to Want Me" was the first single by the Shadows to feature vocals since "Saturday Dance", released as the B-side to "Lonesome Fella" in 1959. "Atlantis" was recorded on 13 December 1962 at EMI Studios in London; "I Want You to Want Me", on the other hand, was recorded on 1 May 1963 whilst the group were in Barcelona. The Shadows came up with the title "Atlantis" whilst on a bus in Barcelona, saying it was "a follow-on to the Telstar, Polaris idea".

Reviewed in New Record Mirror, "Atlantis" was described as having "a medium tempo beat with some strings in the background. Rather like all the rest of their stuff but still with a lot of commercial appeal. There's also a femme chorus on the backing. Nice stuff for the younger teens". Reviewing for Disc, Don Nicholl described it as an "attractive Latin beat instrumental" and "a deceptive little item – by no means so simple as it sounds".

== Track listing ==
7": Columbia / DB 7047

1. "Atlantis" – 2:47
2. "I Want You to Want Me" – 2:34

== Personnel ==
- Hank Marvin – electric lead guitar
- Bruce Welch – acoustic rhythm guitar
- Brian "Licorice" Locking – electric bass guitar
- Brian Bennett – drums, triangle
- Norrie Paramor Strings – all other instrumentation

== Charts ==
Chart (1963)	Peak position
Australia (Kent Music Report)	3
Belgium (Ultratop 50 Flanders)	11
Belgium (Ultratop 50 Wallonia)	15
Denmark (Danmarks Radio)	7
Germany (GfK)	23
Hong Kong	2
Ireland (IRMA)	3
Israel (Kol Israel)	5
Netherlands (Single Top 100)	6
New Zealand (Lever Hit Parade)	4
Norway (VG-lista)	5
South Africa (SARMDA)	3
Spain (Promusicae)	18
Sweden (Kvällstoppen)	4
UK Singles (OCC)	2
