= Tony Meehan =

British musician (1943–2005)

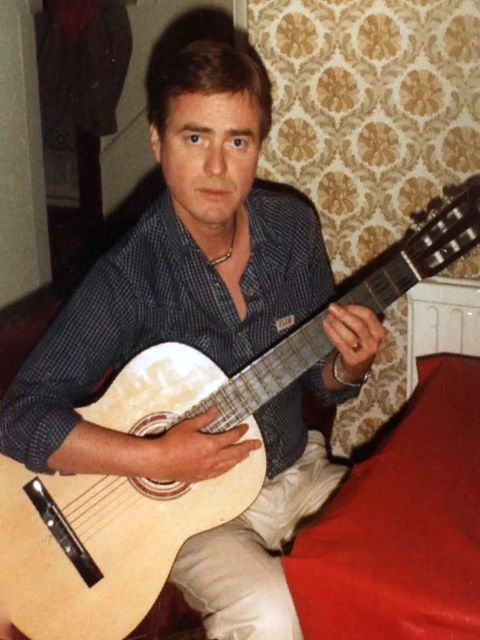

Background information
- Also known as: "The Baron"
- Born: Daniel Joseph Anthony Meehan; 2 March 1943; New End, Hampstead, North London, England
- Died: 28 November 2005 (aged 62) Paddington, London, England
- Genre: Rock 'n' Roll
- Occupations: Drummer, music producer and arranger, lecturer in psychology
- Instrument: Drums
- Years active: 1956–1990
- Labels: Decca; Apple; Columbia; EMI; Parlophone; CBS; Ariola; MCA; Polydor; Marmalade
- Formerly of: The Shadows; Jet Harris & Tony Meehan; The Vipers Skiffle Group; Billy Fury

Daniel Joseph Anthony Meehan (2 March 1943 – 28 November 2005) was a founder member of the British group the Drifters with Jet Harris, Hank Marvin and Bruce Welch, which evolved into the Shadows. He played drums on early Cliff Richard and the Shadows hits and on early Shadows' instrumentals.

Meehan was professionally nicknamed "The Baron" by his many admirers and friends within the British pop-rock music industry. He is reckoned to have influenced many thousands of teenage boys and adolescents to take up music as a career, including Mick Fleetwood of Fleetwood Mac, as a result of his iconic film performance in Cliff Richard's film The Young Ones. His drumming style (cf. "Bongo Blues", "Apache") is noticeably different from that of other drummers who the Shadows employed during 1958–2010 such as Brian Bennett, Clem Cattini and Trevor Spencer. In his contribution to the 1961 book The Shadows by Themselves, Meehan gives advice to all would-be drummers on drum-kit care and maintenance.

== Biography ==
Meehan was born to Irish Catholic parents at New End Hospital, New End, Hampstead, north London, England. He was 10 when he became interested in playing drums. By 13, he had his first job with a band playing in a dance hall in Willesden, London. He also played timpani with the London Youth Orchestra.

Meehan gradually established himself as a musician in the cabaret circuit, at the Churchill's Club in Bond Street, the Stork Club and other venues. He played briefly with skiffle band The Vipers Skiffle Group, and with R&B outfit the Worried Men, also backing rock'n'roll singers such as Tony Sheridan and Vince Taylor. At the end of 1958 Meehan was asked by Hank Marvin and Bruce Welch to join the Drifters in preparation for a tour with Cliff Richard. He spent the next three years with the group, which soon became The Shadows.

Meehan left the Shadows in October 1961 to work as an arranger/producer and session drummer for Joe Meek (John Leyton, Michael Cox: "Young Only Once", Andy Cavell) and from early 1962 at Decca Records. To prepare he took an intensive course of drum tuition with Max Abrams, from whom he'd already had a few lessons. He teamed again with Harris (who had also left the Shadows and moved to Decca) and as a duo had success with the instrumental "Diamonds" which also included Jimmy Page on acoustic rhythm guitar. "Diamonds" was a number one hit in the UK. Harris and Meehan had two further hit singles together – "Scarlett O'Hara" and "Applejack".

On 1 January 1962, the Beatles were auditioned at Decca by Meehan, performing a selection of covers they had performed in various clubs over the years, interspersed with three Lennon–McCartney originals. The Beatles later found out that their manager Brian Epstein had paid Meehan to produce the recordings made that day in order for the Beatles to retain ownership of the tapes. Decca rejected the Beatles choosing the Tremeloes, who auditioned the same day as the Beatles. After talks with Epstein, Decca did arrange for Meehan to produce the Beatles at Decca if the Beatles manager agreed to cover the expenses of about £100. On 7 February 1962, Epstein met Meehan, who made condescending comments about the Beatles' audition. With the meeting not going well and Epstein not impressed with Meehan, Epstein rejected the Decca offer.

Meehan briefly played with the Shadows some years later when Brian Bennett was in hospital. He quit the music industry in the 1990s for a major career change as a psychologist, as a result of a lifelong hobby/interest. He worked in London at a local college lecturing in psychology until his death. He was a regular churchgoer at his local Roman Catholic church in Maida Vale.

== Early career groups (pre-Shadows/Drifters) ==
1956 – (Skiffle Trio)

- John 'Frog' Steiner (guitar/vocals), Tony Kessler (guitar/harmonica) and Tony Meehan (washboard/side-drum)

1956–57 – (Trad-Irish-band)

- Billy Flynn (guitar/vocals), Raymond Cleary (guitar), David Rees (stand-up bass guitar) and Tony Meehan (washboard)

1958 – The Vipers

- Wally Whyton (vocals/guitar), Johnny Booker (vocals/guitar), Freddy Lloyd (vocals/guitar) Jet Harris (bass) and Tony Meehan (drums)

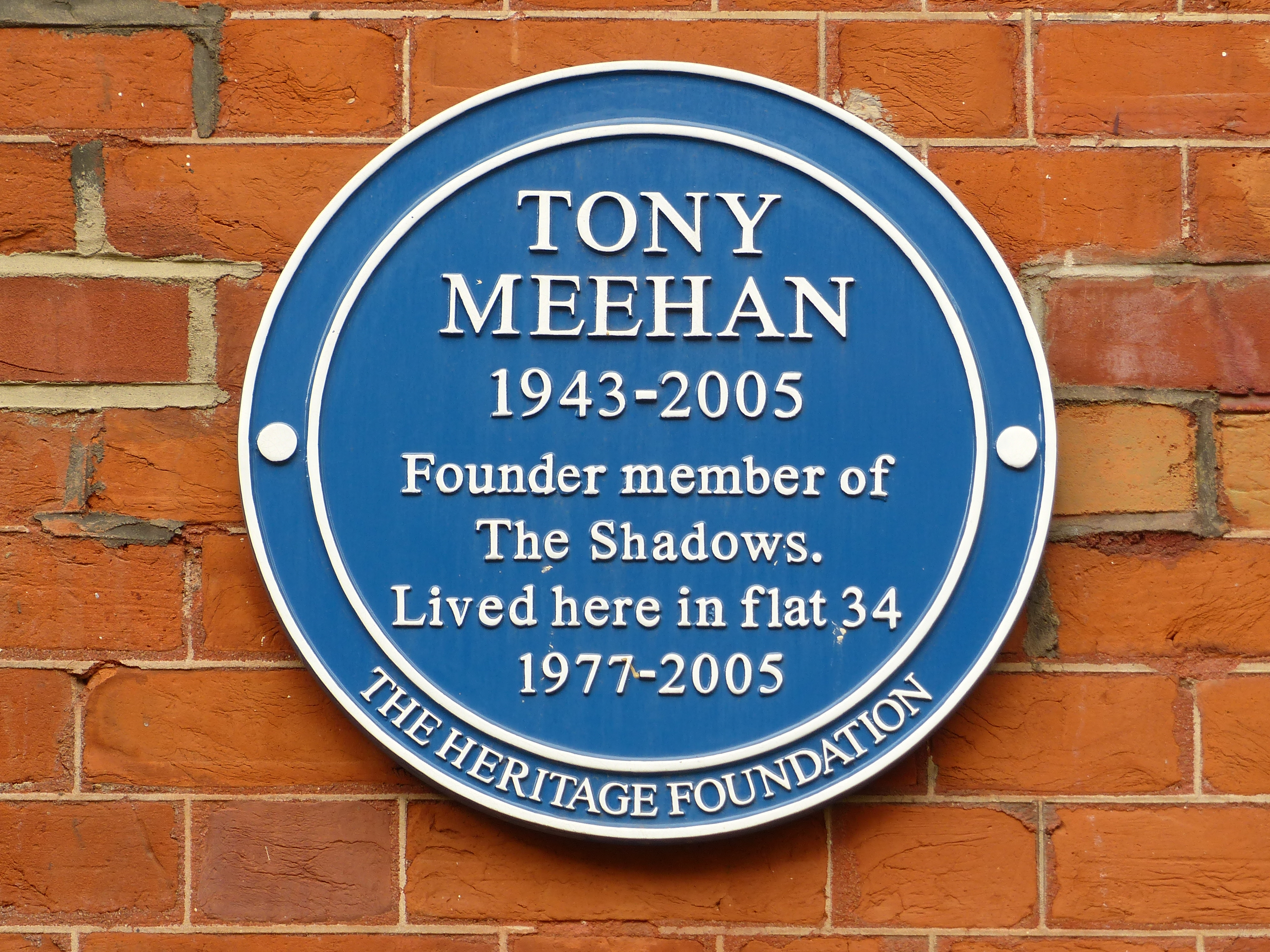

== Death ==
On 29 November 2005, BBC News quoted Bruce Welch as saying that Meehan had died the previous day, as a result of head injuries, following a fall down the main staircase at his London flat in Maida Vale. Meehan died at St Mary's Hospital, Paddington, London.

As the drummer with the Shadows, Tony Meehan helped to lay the foundations for British rock’n’roll, both backing Cliff Richard and on a long string of instrumental hits recorded under the group's own name. John Lennon once claimed that before Cliff and the Shadows, there had been nothing worth listening to in British music. As the first backing band to emerge as stars in their own right, they were early trailblazers for the beat-group boom that eclipsed them. – Shadows drummer who became an A&R man for Decca – The Times (Obituaries), 30 November 2005.

At his death, Meehan had been twice married and had seven children, including pop singer Siobhan de Maré.

== Groupography ==
- The Vipers Skiffle Group
- The Drifters
- Cliff Richard and the Drifters
- The Shadows
- Cliff Richard and the Shadows
- Jet Harris & Tony Meehan
- The Tony Meehan Combo

== Discography ==
=== Performance credits ===
- Cliff Richard and the Shadows – "Cliff Sings" – 1959 /1960 (Columbia/ABC Paramount)
- Cliff Richard and the Shadows – "Me and My Shadows" – 1960 (Columbia)
- Cliff Richard and the Shadows – "The Young Ones" – 1961 (Columbia)
- Cliff Richard and the Drifters – "Move It" – 1958 (Columbia)
- Cliff Richard and the Drifters – "Living Doll" – 1959 (Columbia)
- The Shadows – "Apache" – 1960 (Columbia)
- The Shadows – "Wonderful Land" – 1960 (Columbia)
- The Shadows – "Man of Mystery" – 1960 (Columbia)
- The Shadows – "The Shadows" – 1961 (Columbia)
- The Shadows – "Kon-Tiki" – 1961 (Columbia)
- The Shadows – "F.B.I." – 1961 (Columbia)
- The Shadows – "See You in My Drums" – 1961 (Columbia)
- The Shadows – "Meeting with the Shadows" – 1962 (Columbia – 33QPX 8027)
- Roger Daltrey – "Ride A Rock Horse" – 1975 (Track / MCA)

=== As Jet Harris and Tony Meehan ===
==== Albums ====
- Remembering – LP – Decca
- Best of – CD
- Diamonds and Gems – CD

==== Singles ====
- "Diamonds" / "Footstomp" – 7" – Decca, #1 on British charts
- "Scarlett O'Hara" / "Hully Gully" – 7" – Decca #2 on British charts
- "Applejack" / "Tall Texan" – 7" – Decca, #4 on British charts

==== EPs ====
- Jet & Tony (with Jet Harris, 1963) – Decca DFE 8528, UK No. 3.

=== As solo artist ===
- "Song of Mexico" / "Kings Go Fifth" – 7" – Decca – 1964
- "Zola / Reaching Out For Gold" – 1984 (Magus)

=== Production credits ===
==== Albums ====
- Donal Donnelly – Take the Name of Donnelly – 1968 (Decca)
- WHITE TRASH - ROAD TO NOWHERE - 1969 (Apple 6). Edited by BeatlesandBeyond presenter Pete Dicks

- Tim Hardin – Painted Head – 1973 (CBS)
- Danny Mcbride – "Morningside" – 1973 (CBS)
- John Howard – Kid in a Big World – 1975 (CBS 80473)
- Kevin Westlake – Stars Fade (In Hotel Rooms) – 1976 (UTOPIA 1–1388)
- Roger Daltrey – One of the Boys – 1977 (MCA)
- Eric Burdon – Darkness Darkness – 1980 (Polydor)
- Kim & The Cadillacs – Rock Bottom – 1980 (Ariston Music AR/LP/12379) (Italian release)

==== Singles ====
- Louise Cordet – "I'm Just a Baby" / "In a Matter of Moments" – 1962 (Decca)
- Jay and Tommy Scott – "Angela" / "Did You" – 1962 (Decca)
- Jet Harris & Tony Meehan – Diamonds" / "Footstomp" 1963 – (Decca)
- Jet Harris & Tony Meehan – "Scarlett O'Hara" / "Hully Gully" 1963 – (Decca)
- Jet Harris & Tony Meehan – "Applejack" / "Tall Texan" – 1963 – (Decca)
- Tony Meehan – "Song of Mexico" / "Kings Go Fifth" – 7" – Decca – 1964
- Louise Cordet – "Don't Let the Sun Catch You Crying" / "Loving Baby" – 1964 (Decca)
- Glyn Johns – "Old Deceiver Time" b/w "Dancing With You" 1963 (Decca F11753)
- Jet Harris – "My Lady" / "You Don't Live Twice" – 1964 (Decca)
- Glyn Johns – "Today You're Gone" b/w "Such Stuff of Dreams" 1965 (Lyntone LYN 827)
- Glyn Johns – "I'll Follow The Sun" b/w "I'll Take You Dancing" 1965 (Pye 7N 15818)
- Glyn Johns – "Mary Anne" b/w "Like Grains of Yellow Sand" 1965 (Immediate IM 013)
- Glyn Johns – "Lady Jane" feat. Brian Jones on Sitar 1966
- Les Anges – "Une Fille, Mais Qu'Est-Ce Que C'Est" (7", EP) – 1967 (Odeon/EMI MEO 141) (French release)
- Wishful Thinking – "Peanuts / Cherry, Cherry" – 1967 (Decca/Southern Music F 12627)
- Wishful Thinking – "Meet The Sun / Easier Said Than Loving You" – 1967 (Decca F22673)
- Wishful Thinking – "Count to Ten / Hang Around Girl" – 1967 (Decca F 12598)
- The Dalys – "Sweet Maria / Leaving Time" – 1967 (Fontana TF 809)
- The Dalys – "A Fistful of Dollars / The Man With No Name" – 1967 (Fontana TF 841)
- Richard Anthony – "Put Your Head on My Shoulder" – 1967 (Columbia/Sparta Music DB 8143)
- White Trash – "Road to Nowhere" / "Illusions" – 1969 (Apple)
- Trash – "Golden Slumbers/Carry That Weight" / "Trash Can" – 1969 (Apple)
- Keith Meehan – "Darkness of My Life / Hooker St." – 1969 (Marmalade)
- Frabjoy And Runcible Spoon – "I'm Beside Myself / Animal Song" – 1969 (Marmalade 598019)
- Hank Marvin – "Break Another Dawn / Morning Star" – 1970 (Columbia DB 8693)
- Cody – "I Belong with You" / "Wanna Make You Happy" – 1971 (Polydor/Atco)
- Colin Blunstone – "It's Magical / Summersong" – 1974 (Epic)
- Darryl Read – "High Rise Angry Young Man" – 1981 (on "Collectomatic vol I" – LP—1997 (white label))
