= Jet Harris =

English musician (1939–2011)

Jet Harris MBE
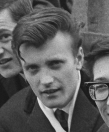
- Harris in 1962

Background information
- Born: Terence Harris; 6 July 1939; Kingsbury, North London, England
- Died: 18 March 2011 (aged 71) Winchester, Hampshire, England
- Genre: Rock music
- Occupation: Musician
- Instruments: Bass, guitar
- Years active: 1952–2011
- Formerly of: The Delinquents; Wee Willie Harris & Tony Crombies Rockets; the Vipers Skiffle Group; Jeff Beck Group; The Shadows; Jet Harris & Tony Meehan
- Website: jetharris.biz

Terence "Jet" Harris (6 July 1939 – 18 March 2011) was an English rock and roll musician. He was an original member of Cliff Richard's backing band the Shadows, serving as the bass guitarist from the group's inception until April 1962, after which he had success as a soloist and as a duo with that band's drummer, Tony Meehan.

== Early life ==
Terence Harris, the only child of Bill and Winifred Harris, was born at Kingsbury Maternity Hospital, Honeypot Lane, Kingsbury, North West London, England. His prowess as a sprinter at Dudden Hill secondary modern school earned him the nickname Jet.

Although he learned to play clarinet as a teenager, he made his own four-string double bass to play in a jazz group and later graduated to a professionally made double bass. In 1958, while playing jazz with drummer Tony Crombie and his group the Rockets, Harris received a Framus bass guitar from Crombie and became one of the first British exponents of the instrument. He played in several groups, including the British skiffle group, the Vipers, and with the Most Brothers (featuring future music producer Mickie Most).

== Cliff Richard and the Shadows ==
In 1959, he joined Cliff Richard's backing group, then known as "the Drifters", who, in July 1959 at a meeting in the Six Bells pub in Ruislip, changed their name to the Shadows at Harris's suggestion, in order to avoid a legal injunction from the U.S. band, who at the time unbeknownst to its members shared the same name. In 1959, after the neck of his Framus was terminally damaged in a dressing room accident, Harris was presented by the importers with a Fender Precision Bass, one of the first to come to Britain from the United States.

Other sources state that Cliff Richard gave Jet the first Fender Bass (a "Sunburst") guitar in the UK in 1960, about a year after band-mate Hank Marvin got his first red Fender Stratocaster guitar. Both instruments were eventually replaced with matching versions which were used in the film The Young Ones, in which The Shadows played "The Savage" (showing the famous Shadows' walk) to an invited audience of teenagers.

Harris also contributed vocally, adding backup harmonies and occasional lead vocals. He had a trademark scream, used in the Shadows' "Feeling Fine" and Cliff Richard's "Do You Wanna Dance?"

In Mike Read's book, The Story of the Shadows, Harris attributed the start of his depression and related alcohol addiction to discovering that Cliff Richard had had an affair with his wife Carol Costa (whom he had married in 1959) after they were separated. In 1962, Harris left The Shadows following disagreements, mostly with Bruce Welch over his drinking habit (this was also documented in The Story of the Shadows, written by the group with Read).

== Soloist and with the Shadows' Tony Meehan ==
After leaving the Shadows, he signed a contract with Decca and released solo instrumental and vocal work with some success, "Besame Mucho" and "The Man with the Golden Arm" featuring a Fender VI six-string bass guitar.

In October 1962, Harris was part of a package tour of England headlined by Little Richard also starring Sam Cooke. At 14 of the 21 shows, Gene Vincent also appeared. He introduced the acts and sang "Be-Bop-a-Lula" from the front stalls or orchestra pit (work permit restrictions limited his contribution). A photograph of the four musicians backstage at one of the tour venues is part of the Harry Hammond Photographic Collection held by the Victoria & Albert Museum, London. A publicity poster for the tour includes the straplines: "Jet Harris with the JETBLACKS" and "First Solo Appearance" alongside a photograph of Harris.

In late 1962 he was voted 'top instrumentalist' in the readers' poll of the New Musical Express. Then, as part of a duo with former Shadows drummer Tony Meehan, he topped the UK Singles Chart for three weeks in early 1963 with a cover of Jerry Lordan's "Diamonds". Harris and Meehan followed this with two further hit singles, "Scarlett O'Hara" (also written by Jerry Lordan) a UK No. 2, and "Applejack" (composed by Les Vandyke) reaching UK No. 4 also in 1963. Tracks from "Diamonds" onward were recorded with Harris using standard Fender Jaguar and Gretsch guitars, usually de-tuned to D instead of E.

Harris and Meehan also made two short cameo appearances in the black and white film Just for Fun, released in 1963. In the film, "Jet and the Jetblacks" played "Man From Nowhere", whilst the duo performed "(Doin' the) Hully Gully", a vocal track released as the b-side of their hit "Scarlett O'Hara".

Harris was partly responsible for helping Jimmy Page and John Paul Jones break into the music business. Page's first major session was as a rhythm guitarist on "Diamonds" in late 1962. After "Diamonds" became a hit, Harris and Meehan hired Jones to play bass in their touring band.

There were several court appearances involving drunkenness and violent behaviour before the partnership with Meehan came to an abrupt end in September 1963 when a car crash on what was then the A44 (now the B4084) near Evesham, Worcestershire, (in which his girlfriend, singer Billie Davis, was also injured), meant that this success did not last long. Harris attempted a comeback as the "Jet Harris Band", in 1966 and was briefly in the line-up of The Jeff Beck Group in 1967, but somewhat fell out of the music industry. He then worked variously as a labourer, bricklayer, porter in a hospital, bus conductor, and as a seller of cockles on the beach in Jersey.

== Later career ==
Harris was declared bankrupt in 1988. The BBC reported that it took Harris 30 years of heavy drinking before he finally admitted to being an alcoholic and sought help. For many years, Harris made a point in his stage shows of saying how long it had been since he quit drinking, winning applause from audiences who knew how it had wrecked his career in the 1960s. Harris still played occasionally, with backing band the Diamonds or as a guest with the Rapiers, and guested with Tony Meehan at Cliff Richard's 1989 'The Event' concerts.

In 1998, he was awarded a Fender Lifetime Achievement Award for his role in popularising the bass guitar in Britain. He appeared annually at Bruce Welch's 'Shadowmania' and toured backed by the Rapiers (a Shadows tribute band). He recorded continuously from the late 1980s with a variety of collaborators, including Tangent, Alan Jones (also an ex-Shadows bassist), Bobby Graham and the Local Heroes. His previous problems with stage nerves had seemingly disappeared, and 2006 saw Harris' first single release in over forty years, "San Antonio".

From 2005 to 2009, Harris achieved a lifetime ambition by touring UK theatres with his own show, "Me and My Shadows". The Rapiers performed as his 'Shadows', and he had a special guest star in his former girlfriend Billie Davis, who had rescued him when the pair were in a road crash in late 1963 that effectively ended his career. "I'm going to go out in my twilight years with a big bang—and 'Me and My Shadows' is one of my little dreams," Harris said at the time.

In 2007, Harris was invited by UK singer Marty Wilde to be a special guest on his 50th Anniversary tour. This culminated in an evening at the London Palladium, with other guests including Wilde's daughters Kim and Roxanne, Justin Hayward of The Moody Blues and original Wildcats members Big Jim Sullivan, Brian "Licorice" Locking and Brian Bennett, who joined Hank Marvin and Bruce Welch of The Shadows on stage with Wilde and the current Wildcats (Neville Marten and Eddie Allen on guitar, Roger Newell bass, and Bryan Fitzpatrick, drums). The show's finale featured the closest thing to a Shadows reunion possible, with Marvin, Welch, Harris, Locking and Brian Bennett (who in 1962 had replaced Tony Meehan, now deceased) all appearing on stage with the show's company.

The evening was filmed, and a DVD released, with Harris playing three tunes – "Diamonds", "Theme For Something Really Important" and "Scarlett O'Hara" – backed by the Wildcats. So successful was this tour that Wilde repeated the invitation to join him on his 2010 Born to Rock and Roll tour, which finished in Basingstoke on 20 November. Harris said that this was his most enjoyable working experience in years.

His fan club arranged a 70th birthday party for him on 5 July 2009, at the Winter Gardens, Weston-super-Mare.

In 2010, Harris started working with the Shadowers, led by guitarist Justin Daish. He began plans for a new show, featuring fresh material he had never performed before. However, regular tour dates and studio recordings with the Shadowers, Brian "Licorice" Locking and Alan Jones, though discussed, never materialised due to Harris' poor health. His last concert (5 February 2011 at Ferneham Hall, Fareham) saw him perform one tune ("Here I Stand" from his album The Phoenix Rises) with both Locking and Jones; this was the only time the three Shadows bass guitarists would ever perform together.

== Honours ==
He was appointed Member of the Order of the British Empire (MBE) in the 2010 New Year Honours.

In 2010, Harris was presented with a special award from the US Fender guitar company for his services to their company in effectively launching their bass guitar in the UK in 1960.

== Personal life and death ==
Harris had five sons and a daughter. He resided in Bembridge, Isle of Wight. He was a heavy smoker and died at 71 years old on 18 March 2011, two years after being diagnosed with cancer of unknown primary, at the home of his partner Janet Hemingway, in Winchester.

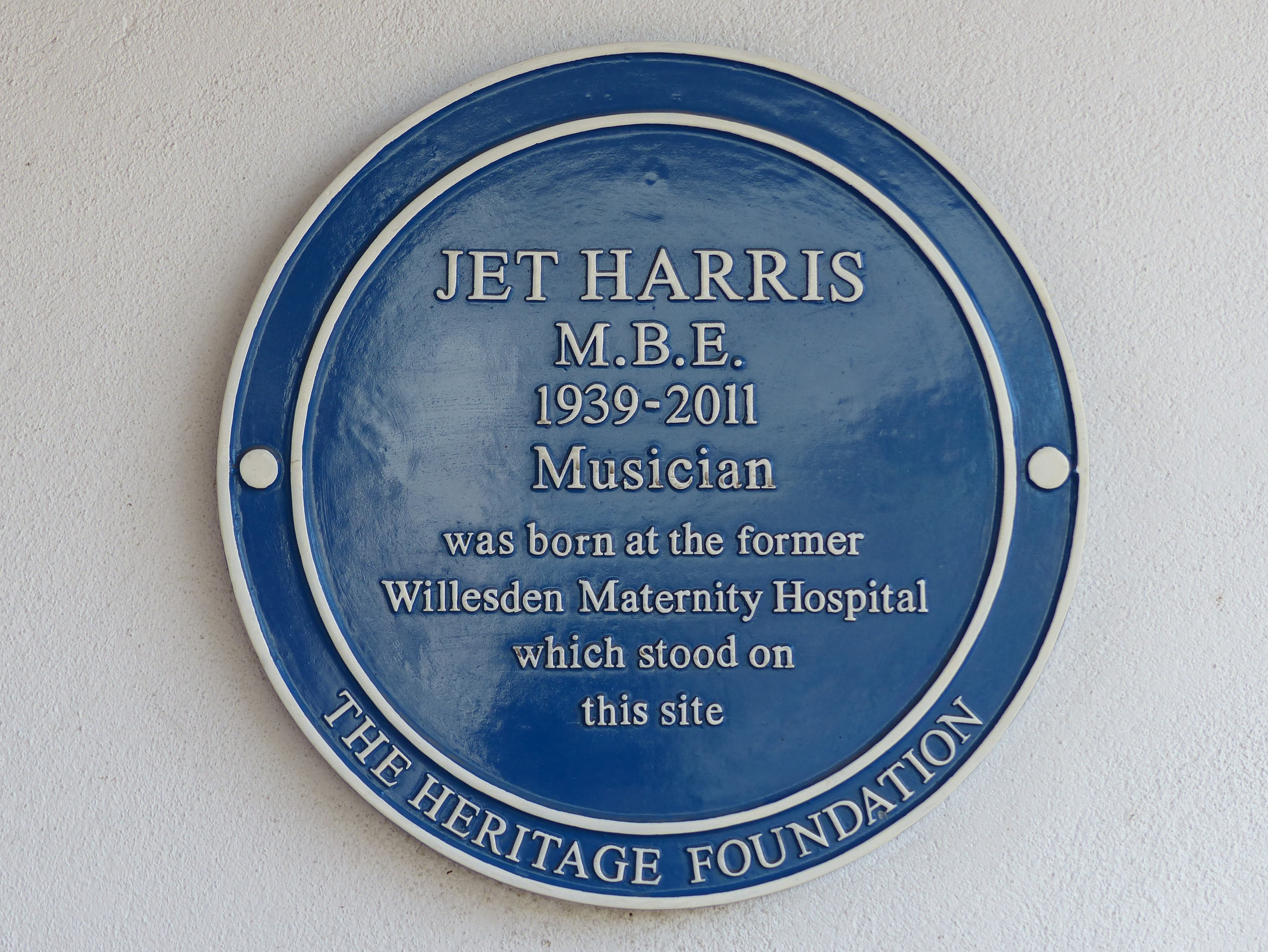
Harris' blue plaque

In 2012, The Heritage Foundation erected a blue plaque in his memory at the Kingswood Centre, Honeypot Lane, Kingsbury, on the site of the former Kingsbury Maternity Hospital where he was born. At the luncheon that followed the unveiling of the plaque, various musicians took part in a performance in Harris' memory, including Mike Berry, Clem Cattini of The Tornados, bassist Mo Foster, guitarist Daniel Martin and Harris' backing group the Shadowers. Tributes were read by Bruce Welch and Marty Wilde.

== Members of pre-Shadows groups ==
1952 – School band

- Peter Newman (saxophone) + John Welsh (clarinet) + Jet Harris (bass) + Ray Edmunds (drums)

1956 – The Delinquents (jazz trio)

- ? (vocals) + ? (guitar) + Jet Harris (bass) + ? (drums)

1956–57 – Wee Willee Harris & Tony Crombie's Rockets

- ? (vocals) + ? (guitar) + Jet Harris (bass) + Tony Crombie (drums)

1958 – The Vipers (aka the Vipers Skiffle Group)

- 7" single ("Liverpool Blues" / "Summertime Blues" on Parlophone)
- Wally Whyton (vocals), Johnny Booker (guitar), Freddie Floyd (guitar), Jet Harris (bass), Tony Meehan (drums)
- 1958 – The Vipers – live concert
- Wally Whyton (vocals), Johnny Booker (guitar), Hank Marvin (guitar), Jet Harris (bass), Johnny Pilgrim (wb)

== Discography ==
=== Albums ===
- Inside Jet Harris – Ellie Jay Records/Castle Records (1977)
- Diamonds and Other Gems – Deram 820634-2 (1989)
- The Anniversary Album – Q Records (1992)
- Twelve Great Guitar Gems – Zing Records (1994)
- Live Over England – Zing Records (1996)
- Beyond the Shadow of a Doubt – Zing Records (1993)
- Two of a Kind (with Alan Jones) – Zing Records (1997)
- Tributes and Rarities – Zing Records (1995)
- One of Our Shadows Is Missing (with The Local Heroes) (1998)
- The Phoenix Rises – Mustang Music (2001)
- Diamonds Are Trumps – Solent Records (2002)
- The Journey – Crazy Lighthouse Records Jet Harris, Nigel Hopkins, Paul Rumble, Cliff Hall, Ruud Wegman (2007)

=== Singles ===
Year	Title	Label	Peak chart positions							Album
Year	Title	Label	UK	AUS	CAN	IRE	NOR	NZ	SWE	Album
May 1962	"Besame Mucho" b/w "Chills and Fever"	Decca F11466	22	42	—	—	—	—	—	Diamonds and Other Gems
August 1962	"Main Theme (from The Man with the Golden Arm)" b/w "Some People"	Decca F11488	12	95	—	8	—	—	—	Diamonds and Other Gems
January 1963	"Diamonds" (with Tony Meehan) b/w "Footstomp"	Decca F11563	1	14	22	1	3	2	14	Diamonds and Other Gems
April 1963	"Scarlet O'Hara" (with Tony Meehan) b/w "(Doing The) Hully Gully"	Decca F11644	2	30	—	7	—	4	14	Diamonds and Other Gems
August 1963	"Applejack" (with Tony Meehan) b/w "The Tall Texan"	Decca F11710	4	16	—	5	—	—	—	Diamonds and Other Gems
February 1964	"Big Bad Bass" b/w "Rifka"	Decca F11841	—	—	—	—	—	—	—	
July 1967	"My Lady" b/w "You Don't Live Twice"	Fontana TF849	64 (Note: Chart position is from the official UK "Breakers List".)	—	—	—	—	—	—	
October 1975	"Theme for a Fallen Angel" b/w "This Sportin' Life"	SRT SRTS75355	—	—	—	—	—	—	—	
July 1977	"Guitar Man" b/w "Theme"	SRT SRTS77389	—	—	—	—	—	—	—	
1998	"Back in Our Rock 'n' Roll Days" (with Billie Davis)	Strange Country SC-0001	—	—	—	—	—	—	—	
September 2006	"San Antonio" b/w "Ignition"	Crazy Lighthouse CLRCD0601	—	—	—	—	—	—	—	The Journey

=== EPs ===
- Jet Harris – Decca DFE 8502
- Jet & Tony (with Tony Meehan, 1963) – Decca DFE 8528, UK No. 3.

== Bibliography ==
Books

- Driftin' with Cliff Richard, by J. Harris, R. Ellis and C. Richard
- The Shadows by Themselves by Royston Ellis with the Shadows. Consul Books. 1961. No ISBN.
- The Story of the Shadows by Mike Read. 1983. Elm Tree books. ISBN 0-241-10861-6.
- That Sound (From "Move It" on, the story of the magic sound of the Shadows), by R.Pistolesi, M. Addey & M.Mazzini. Publ: Vanni Lisanti. June 2000. No ISBN.
- The Complete Rock Family Rock Trees, by Pete Frame. Omnibus. ISBN 0-7119-6879-9.
- Guinness World Records: British Hit Singles and Albums (19th Edn), David Roberts. ISBN 1-904994-10-5.
- The Complete Book of the British Charts Singles and Albums, by Neil Warwick, Jon Kutner & Tony Brown, 3rd Edn. ISBN 978-1-84449-058-5.
- Jet Harris — Survivor, by Dave Nicolson, ISBN 978-0-9562679-0-0, 31 October 2009.
- Jet Harris 'Dans l'Ombre Des Shadows', by Gerard Lautrey. ISBN 978-1-4716-1124-7. 2012

Sheet music books

- The Jet Harris Guitar Book Francis Day & Hunter Ltd. No ISBN. (16 pages)
