= Hits from The Young Ones =

1962 EP by Cliff Richard and the Shadows

EP by Cliff Richard and the Shadows
- Released: April 1962
- Recorded: April–August 1961
- Studios: EMI, London
- Genre: Pop
- Length: 11:04
- Label: Columbia
- Producer: Norrie Paramor

Cliff Richard and the Shadows chronology
Cliff Richard (No.1) (1962)	Hits from The Young Ones (1962)	Cliff Richard (No.2) (1962)

Hits from The Young Ones is an EP by Cliff Richard and the Shadows, released in April 1962. The EP is a 7-inch vinyl record and released in mono with the catalogue number Columbia SEG 8159. The record was the UK Record Retailer number-one EP for two weeks in June 1962.

The EP features songs from The Young Ones film which were also released on its soundtrack album in December 1961. "The Young Ones" was released at the beginning of January 1962, topping the UK Record Retailer chart for six weeks. The EP was released in early April, when the title track was climbing out of the top-ten of the charts. "The Young Ones" is the first track on the EP, followed by "Got a Funny Feeling" which had been released as the B-side to "When the Girl in Your Arms Is the Girl in Your Heart" in October 1961. The flip side features "Lessons in Love", which would go on to be released as a single in several European countries, and "We Say Yeah" which had been released as the B-side to "The Young Ones".

== Track listing ==
Side A
No.	Title	Writer(s)	Length
1.	"The Young Ones"	Sid Tepper; Roy C. Bennett	3:09
2.	"Got a Funny Feeling"	Bruce Welch; Hank Marvin	2:55

Side B
No.	Title	Writer(s)	Length
3.	"Lessons in Love"	Sy Soloway; Shirley Wolfe	2:49
4.	"We Say Yeah"	Welch; Marvin; Peter Gormley	2:11
Total length:			11:04

== Personnel ==
- Cliff Richard – lead vocals
- Hank Marvin – lead guitar, backing vocals (4)
- Bruce Welch – rhythm guitar, backing vocals (4)
- Jet Harris – bass guitar
- Tony Meehan – drums
- Norrie Paramor – piano (2)

== Charts ==
Chart (1962)	Peak position
UK Record Retailer Top 20	1
UK Melody Maker Top 10	2
