= At the Movies 1959–1974 =

1996 compilation album by Cliff Richard

At the Movies: 1959–1974

Compilation album by Cliff Richard
- Released: 1996
- Recorded: 1959–1974
- Genres: Pop; rock
- Label: EMI

Cliff Richard chronology
Songs from Heathcliff (1995)	At the Movies: 1959–1974 (1996)	Heathcliff Live (1996)

Professional ratings
Review scores
Source	Rating
AllMusic	2.5/5 stars

At the Movies: 1959–1974 is a 1996 double-CD compilation album by Cliff Richard, featuring songs that he performed in his various movie appearances.

== Track listing ==
=== CD 1 ===
1. "No Turning Back" 2:28
2. "Living Doll" 2:37
3. "Mad About You" 1:44
4. "Love" 2:23
5. "A Voice in the Wilderness" 2:10
6. "The Shrine on the Second Floor" 2:26
7. "Friday Night" 2:50
8. "Got a Funny Feeling" 2:52
9. "Nothing's Impossible" 3:26
10. "The Young Ones 3:07
11. "Lessons in Love" 2:48
12. "When the Girl in Your Arms" 2:23
13. "We Say Yeah" 2:11
14. "(It's) Wonderful to Be Young" 2:35
15. "Outsider" 2:43
16. "Seven Days to a Holiday" 3:10
17. "Summer Holiday" 2:08
18. "Let Us Take You for a Ride" 4:36
19. "A Stranger in Town" 2:33
20. "Bachelor Boy" 1:59
21. "A Swingin' Affair" 4:16
22. "Dancing Shoes" 2:07
23. "The Next Time" 2:56
24. "Big News" 1:54
25. "Wonderful Life" 2:26
26. "A Girl in Every Port" 2:47
27. "A Little Imagination" 1:15
28. "On the Beach" 2:30
29. "Do You Remember" 2:48

=== CD 2 ===
1. "Look Don't Touch" 1:41
2. "In the Stars" 3:57
3. "What've I Gotta Do" 2:30
4. "A Matter of Moments" 2:56
5. "Wonderful Life" 2:19
6. "Shooting Star" 2:37
7. "Finders Keepers" 2:36
8. "Time Drags By" 2:31
9. "Washerwoman" 2:06
10. "La La La Song" 2:26
11. "Oh Senorita" 4:14
12. "This Day" 2:58
13. "Paella" 2:50
14. "Two a Penny" 2:43
15. "Twist and Shout" 2:37
16. "I'll Love You Forever Today" 3:02
17. "Questions" 2:48
18. "It's Only Money" 2:39
19. "Midnight Blue" 3:41
20. "The Game" 3:10
21. "Brumburger Duet" 1:39
22. "Take Me High" 2:41
23. "The Anti-Brotherhood of Man" 1:29
24. "Winning" 3:25
25. "The Young Ones" (Film version) 2:40*
26. "Lessons in Love" (Edited film version) 1:58*
27. "Bachelor Boy" (Film version) 1:58*
28. "Summer Holiday" (End title film version) 1:20*
- Tracks marked with an asterisk are bonus tracks on the CD box release.

== Charts ==
Chart	Position
UK Albums Chart	17
