= The Young Ones (album) =

1961 soundtrack album by Cliff Richard and the Shadows

Soundtrack album by Cliff Richard and the Shadows
- Released: 15 December 1961
- Recorded: January – August 1961
- Genre: Pop
- Label: Columbia (EMI) 33SX 1384
- Producer: Norrie Paramor

Cliff Richard and the Shadows chronology
21 Today (1961)	The Young Ones (1961)	32 Minutes and 17 Seconds (1962)

Alternative cover
- US release of "Wonderful to Be Young"

The Young Ones is a soundtrack album by Cliff Richard and the Shadows to the film of the same name. It is their first soundtrack album and Richard's sixth album overall. It was produced by Norrie Paramor, with music by Ronald Cass and Stanley Black. The album topped the UK Albums Chart for six weeks (with another eleven weeks at number two) and charted for 42 weeks in total when the chart was a top twenty. The album became the first UK soundtrack to sell more than one million copies in total, combining UK and international sales.

Three singles were released from the album, the first two prior to the album release. "When the Girl in Your Arms is the Girl in Your Heart" was released in October 1961 and reached number 3 in the UK Singles Chart. The Shadows' instrumental, "The Savage", was released in November and reached number 10. Lastly, "The Young Ones" was released in January 1962 and, with half a million pre-orders, debuted at number 1. It spent 6 weeks at the summit, going on to sell a million in the UK and become Richard's biggest selling single in the country.

In North America, the album was released under the title Wonderful to Be Young, with the addition of the "Wonderful to Be Young" track which was also released as a single, reaching number 16 on the Canadian CHUM Chart.

== Track listing ==
A majority of the tracks include the Associated British Studio Orchestra.

1. "Friday Night" (Myers / Cass) - A.B.S. Orchestra, The Michael Sammes Singers
2. "Got a Funny Feeling" (Hank Marvin / Bruce Welch) - Cliff Richard and The Shadows
3. "Peace Pipe" (Norrie Paramor) - The Shadows
4. "Nothing's Impossible" (Myers / Cass) - Duet: Cliff Richard and Grazina Frame, A.B.S. Orchestra
5. "The Young Ones" (Sid Tepper / Roy C. Bennett) - Cliff Richard and the Shadows
6. "All for One" (Myers / Cass) - Cliff Richard, The Michael Sammes Singers, A.B.S. Orchestra
7. "Lessons in Love" (Sy Soloway / Shirley Wolfe) - Cliff Richard and the Shadows
8. "No One for Me But Nicky" (Myers / Cass) - Grazina Frame, A.B.S. Orchestra
9. "What D'You Know, We've Got a Show & Vaudeville Routine" (Myers / Cass):
  "Have a Smile for Everyone You Meet" (Rule / Cunningham);
  "Tinkle, Tinkle, Tinkle" (Woods);
  "Algy the Piccadilly Johnny" (Norris);
  "Captain Ginjah" (Leigh / Baston);
  "Joshuah" (Lee / Arthurs);
  "Where Did You Get That Hat?" (Joseph J. Sullivan / James Rolmaz);
  "What D'You Know, We've Got a Show" (Myers / Cass);
  "Living Doll" (Lionel Bart);
  - Cliff Richard, The Michael Sammes Singers, A.B.S. Orchestra
10. "When the Girl in Your Arms Is the Girl in Your Heart" (Sid Tepper / Roy C. Bennett) - Cliff Richard, Norrie Paramor Orchestra
11. "Mambo: a) Just Dance" (Myers / Cass) - The Michael Sammes Singers, A.B.S. Orchestra; "b) Mood Mambo" (Stanley Black) - A.B.S. Orchestra
12. "The Savage" (Norrie Paramor) - The Shadows
13. "We Say Yeah" (Gormley / Welch / Marvin) - Cliff Richard and the Shadows

== Personnel ==
Cliff Richard and the Shadows

- Cliff Richard – lead vocals
- Hank Marvin – lead guitar
- Bruce Welch – rhythm guitar
- Jet Harris – bass guitar
- Tony Meehan – drums
- Grazina Frame – female lead role (portrayed by Carole Gray in the film)
- Ronald Cass – composer
- Mike Sammes Singers – backing singers

== Chart performance ==
Chart (1962)	Peak position
UK Albums (Official Charts)	1
