= Outsider (Cliff Richard song) =

1962 single by Cliff Richard

- Australian release

Single by Cliff Richard with Norrie Paramor and His Orchestra

from the album 21 Today
- B-side: "Y'Arriva"; "Blue Moon"
- Released: January 1962
- Recorded: 30 January 1961
- Studio: EMI Studios, London
- Genre: Pop
- Length: 2:37
- Label: Columbia
- Songwriters: Sid Tepper; Roy C. Bennett
- Producer: Norrie Paramor

Cliff Richard singles chronology
"When the Girl in Your Arms Is the Girl in Your Heart" (1961)	"Outsider" (1962)	"The Young Ones" (1962)

"Outsider" is a song by Cliff Richard with backing by Norrie Paramor and His Orchestra, released on Richard's fourth studio album 21 Today.

== Background and release ==
Songwriters Sid Tepper and Roy C. Bennett were commissioned by music publisher Cyril Simons to write three songs for the film The Young Ones. These were "The Young Ones", "Outsider" and one they had already written "When the Girl in Your Arms Is the Girl in Your Heart". "Outsider" was recorded, but it was decided not to be used in the film as "nobody was 100 per cent sold on it". Instead, it was included on Richard's fourth studio album 21 Today, released in October 1961.

"Outsider" was released as a single in several countries. It was first released in South Africa with the B-side "Y'Arriva" in January 1962, entering the charts at number 7, before peaking at number 1 several weeks later. It was then released in India with the B-side a cover of the standard "Blue Moon", peaking at number 2 in March 1962. It was lastly released in Australia in November 1962 also with the B-side "Blue Moon", peaking at number 22 according David Kent's retrospective chart.

== Track listing ==
7" (South Africa)

1. "Outsider" – 2:37
2. "Y'Arriva" – 3:37

7" (Australia and India)

1. "Outsider" – 2:37
2. "Blue Moon" – 3:25

== Personnel ==
- Cliff Richard – vocals
- Norrie Paramor Orchestra – all instrumentation
- Mike Sammes Singers – backing vocals

== Charts ==
Chart (1962)	Peak position
Australia (Kent Music Report)	22
India (The Voice, Calcutta)	2
South Africa (South Africa & Lourenço Marques Radio)	1
