= Catch Me (Jeri Lynne Fraser song) =

1960 song written by Sid Tepper and Roy C. Bennet

Single by Cliff Richard and the Shadows

from the album 21 Today
- B-side: "'D' in Love" (US) "Tough Enough" (Australia)
- Released: January 1961 (US); April 1962 (Australia)
- Recorded: 9 September 1960
- Studio: EMI Studios, London
- Genre: Pop
- Length: 2:22
- Label: ABC-Paramount; Columbia
- Songwriter(s): Sid Tepper; Roy C. Bennett
- Producer(s): Norrie Paramor

Cliff Richard and the Shadows singles chronology
"I Love You" (1960)	"Catch Me" (1961)	"Theme for a Dream" (1961)

"Catch Me" is a song written by Sid Tepper and Roy C. Bennett and was first recorded in 1960 by American teenage singer Jeri Lynne Fraser and released as the B-side of her single "Poor Begonia (Caught Pneumonia)" in August 1960.

== Cliff Richard and the Shadows version ==
=== Recording and release ===
In September 1960, Cliff Richard and the Shadows recorded a version of "Catch Me" for Richard's album 21 Today, released in October 1961. Writers Tepper and Bennet also wrote the group's single "The Young Ones" and went on to write a total of 21 songs for Richard. Cliff Richard and the Shadows also recorded a cover of another song originally by Fraser, "Lessons in Love" in August 1961 for their album The Young Ones.

"Catch Me" was first released as a single in the US and Canada in January 1961 under the title "Catch Me, I'm Falling". The B-side was "'D' in Love", which was the B-side of the group previous single "I Love You". The following year, "Catch Me" was released as a single in Australia in April 1962 with the B-side "Tough Enough", written by Johnny Otis and Morris Riden and first released by Otis as a single in 1957. An EP titled Forty Days was released in the UK in March 1962 which included "Catch Me" and "Tough Enough" as well as two other songs from 21 Today: a cover of Chuck Berry's "Thirty Days", titled "Forty Days", and "How Wonderful to Know", a cover of the Italian song "Anema e core".

=== Track listing ===
7": ABC-Paramount / 45-10175 (US)

1. "Catch Me, I'm Falling" – 2:27
2. "'D' in Love" – 2:24

7": Columbia / DO-4274 (Australia)

1. "Catch Me" – 2:22
2. "Tough Enough" – 2:09

=== Personnel ===
- Cliff Richard – vocals
- Hank Marvin – lead guitar
- Bruce Welch – rhythm guitar
- Jet Harris – bass guitar
- Tony Meehan – drums

=== Charts ===
Chart (1962)	Peak position
Australia (Kent Music Report)	22
