= The Savage (song) =

1961 single by the Shadows

Single by The Shadows

from the album The Young Ones
- B-side: "Peace Pipe"
- Released: 10 November 1961
- Recorded: 25 May 1961
- Studio: EMI Studios, London
- Genre: Instrumental surf
- Length: 2:22
- Label: Columbia
- Songwriter(s): Norrie Paramor
- Producer(s): Norrie Paramor

The Shadows singles chronology
"Kon-Tiki" (1961)	"The Savage" (1961)	"Wonderful Land" (1962)

"The Savage" is an instrumental track by British group the Shadows, released as a single in November 1961. It peaked at number 10 on the UK Singles Chart.

== Background and release ==
"The Savage" was released as a "double-sided hit" with "Peace Pipe". Both songs were written and produced by Norrie Paramor and the single was released to promote the film The Young Ones, which starred Cliff Richard.

Reviewing for Disc, Don Nicholl described "The Savage" as "a quite, twangy offering with quick, turbulent pace to it". He described "Peace Pipe" as "a more mellow melody. Flows along smoothly and is neatly played by the group".

The Shadows' Hank Marvin said that "The Savage" "is undoubtedly a mediocre record and should never have been released as a single", as "it hasn't a strong enough melody for a single release. It is a run-of-the-mill number with little to recommend it". The group learned of the planned release of the single whilst they were on tour in Australia. They tried to stop it being released, but the record company said they had already pressed 100,000 copies and that it was too late.

== Track listings ==
7": Columbia / DB 4726

1. "The Savage" – 2:22
2. "Peace Pipe" – 2:11

== Personnel ==
- Hank Marvin – electric lead guitar
- Bruce Welch – acoustic rhythm guitar
- Jet Harris – electric bass guitar
- Tony Meehan – drums

== Charts ==
Chart (1961–62)	Peak position
Australia (Kent Music Report)	8
France	9
UK Singles (OCC)	10
