= Cliff with Strings – My Kinda Life =

2023 remix/new re-recordings hybrid project by Cliff Richard

Studio album / Remix album by Cliff Richard
- Released: 3 November 2023
- Length: 43:34
- Label: East West
- Producer: Chris Walden

Cliff Richard chronology
Christmas with Cliff (2022)	Cliff with Strings – My Kinda Life (2023)

Singles from Cliff with Strings – My Kinda Life
- 1. "The Young Ones" Released: 15 September 2023; 2. "The Best of Me" Released: 8 October 2023

Cliff with Strings – My Kinda Life is a remix album/new re-recordings hybrid project by British pop singer Cliff Richard, released on 3 November 2023 by East West Records and via digital media.

The album celebrates seven decades of music and commemorates Richard's 65th year in the music industry, consisting of original vocal recordings reworked with orchestral arrangements by Los Angeles-based German composer and producer Chris Walden. It features Richard's duet "Suddenly" with Olivia Newton-John, from the film Xanadu.

While the majority of the album features archival vocal stems overlaid with new orchestral arrangements, three tracks—"Living Doll", "Summer Holiday", and "The Young Ones"—feature brand-new vocals recorded specifically for the project. The vocal tracks were produced by Cliff Richard and recorded at Middle Ear Studios in Miami, Florida, with vocal engineering handled by Ethan Carlson.

The album was preceded by the release of two singles, a reworking of "The Young Ones" and his 100th single, "The Best of Me".

Richard has said of the album: "After 65 years in the business, it is really an emotional journey to listen back to some of my original vocals and hear just how young I was and how my style changed over the years. These tracks mean a lot to me and they are so refreshed with the orchestral arrangements."

It entered the UK Albums Chart at number 5, becoming Richard's 48th top 10 album.

== Track listing ==
Cliff with Strings – My Kinda Life track listing
No.	Title	Writer(s)	Length
1.	"The Best of Me"	David Foster; Jeremy Lubbock; Richard Marx	4:04
2.	"Carrie"	Terry Britten; Brian Alexander Robertson	3:53
3.	"My Kinda Life"	Chris East	3:30
4.	"Wired for Sound"	Britten; Robertson	3:53
5.	"Living Doll"	Lionel Bart	2:45
6.	"Marmaduke"	Alan Tarney; Trevor Spencer	3:43
7.	"Everything I Do (I Do It For You)"	Bryan Adams; Michael Kamen; Robert Lange	4:13
8.	"Suddenly" (with Olivia Newton-John)	John Farrar	3:57
9.	"Peace in Our Time"	Peter Sinfield; Andy Hill	4:14
10.	"Summer Holiday"	Bruce Welch; Brian Bennett	2:19
11.	"The Young Ones"	Roy Bennett; Sid Tepper	3:30
12.	"We Don't Talk Anymore"	Tarney	4:21
Total length:			43:34

== Charts ==
Chart performance for Cliff with Strings – My Kinda Life
Chart (2023)	Peak position
Belgian Albums (Ultratop Flanders)	144
Hungarian Physical Albums (MAHASZ)	21
Scottish Albums (Official Charts)	7
UK Albums (Official Charts)	5

== Release history ==
Release formats for Cliff with Strings – My Kinda Life
Date	Label	Format	Catalogue number
3 November 2023	East West	Digital, CD	5054197734113
3 November 2023	East West	CD, Alternate gold cover (blue violins), HMV exclusive (UK), JB Hi-Fi (AU, NZ)	5054197734090
3 November 2023	East West	CD, Alternate blue cover, Amazon.co.uk exclusive (UK), JB Hi-Fi (AU, NZ)	5054197734106
24 November 2023	East West	LP, Blue vinyl	5054197734144
