= Lessons in Love (Jeri Lynne Fraser song) =

1961 single by Jeri Lynne Fraser

"Lessons in Love" is a song written by Sy Soloway and Shirley Wolfe and was first recorded by American teenage singer Jeri Lynne Fraser and released as a single in May 1961. The song has had chart success with covers by Cliff Richard and the Shadows and the Allisons.

== Cliff Richard and the Shadows version ==
"Lessons in Love"
- Cover of the single released in Denmark

Single by Cliff Richard and the Shadows

from the album The Young Ones
- B-side: "First Lesson in Love"
- Released: May 1962
- Recorded: 11 August 1961
- Studio: EMI Studios, London
- Genre: Rock and roll
- Length: 2:49
- Label: Columbia
- Songwriters: Sy Soloway; Shirley Wolfe
- Producer: Norrie Paramor

Cliff Richard and the Shadows singles chronology
"I'm Lookin' out the Window" (1962)	"Lessons in Love" (1962)	"It'll Be Me" (1962)

=== Release ===
Cliff Richard and the Shadows first released their version of "Lessons in Love" in December 1961 on The Young Ones. It was the second song originally by Jeri Lynne Fraser that the group had recorded; the first being "Catch Me" in 1960. "Lessons in Love" was only released as a single in Europe and South Africa. First, it was released in May 1962 in Denmark and Germany, before being released in Norway and South Africa and then finally the Netherlands in September 1962. The European single was released with the B-side "First Lesson in Love", written by Pete Chester and Bruce Welch, and originally from Richard third studio album Listen to Cliff!. The South African release features the B-side "How Wonderful to Know", an English version of "Anema e Core" and had first been released on Richard's fourth studio album 21 Today.

=== Track listing ===
7" (Europe)

1. "Lessons in Love" – 2:49
2. "First Lesson in Love" – 1:56

7" (South Africa)

1. "Lessons in Love" – 2:49
2. "How Wonderful to Know" – 2:40

=== Personnel ===
- Cliff Richard – vocals
- Hank Marvin – lead guitar
- Bruce Welch – rhythm guitar
- Jet Harris – bass guitar
- Tony Meehan – drums

=== Charts ===
Chart (1961)	Peak position
Denmark (Quan Musikbureau)	8
Netherlands (Single Top 100)	7
South Africa (Lourenço Marques & South Africa Radio)	3

== The Allisons version ==
"Lessons in Love"

Single by the Allisons
- B-side: "Oh, My Love"
- Released: 19 January 1962
- Genre: Pop
- Length: 2:24
- Label: Fontana
- Songwriters: Sy Soloway; Shirley Wolfe

The Allisons singles chronology
"What a Mess" (1961)	"Lessons in Love" (1962)	"I'll Cross My Fingers" (1962)

British duo the Allisons released their version as a single in January 1962. It was arranged by and features an accompaniment directed by Johnny Keating. Speaking about the single before its release, John Allison said, "This is a different kind of number for us. It has more of a beat and is more the kind of thing we really like doing. It is the type of number that comes naturally to us and I feel confident that it will give us a big chance of hitting a high spot in the charts". However, despite being released in January, it didn't enter the UK Singles Chart until the second week of February, peaking at number 30 four weeks later and becoming the Allisons' final hit.

Reviewing for Disc, Don Nicholl described "Lessons in Love" as "a good light beater of the type they can handle cleverly" and that it was "catchy and crisp". The B-side "Oh, My Love", written by Allison, was described as having "a rather more edgy noise" and a "simple song, but produced it an infection manner that can only help the upper half".
