= Someone Else's Boy =

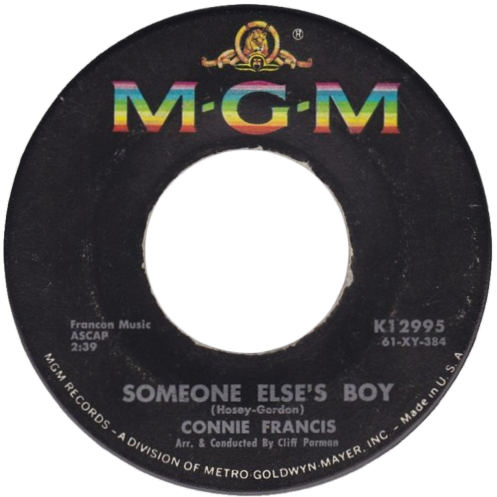

Single by Connie Francis

from the album Connie Francis Sings Second Hand Love
- A-side: "Breakin' In a Brand New Broken heart"
- Released: 1961
- Recorded: 1961
- Genre: Rock and roll
- Length: 2:42
- Label: MGM K 12995
- Songwriters: Athina Hosey, Hal Gordon
- Producer: Jim Viennau

Connie Francis singles chronology
""Where the Boys Are"/ "No one"" (1961)	"Someone Else's Boy" (1961)	""Together"/ "Too Many Rules"" (1961)

Audio
- "Someone Else's Boy" on YouTube

"Someone Else's Boy" is a song written by Hal Gordon and Athena Hosey. It was recorded by Connie Francis on January 31, 1961, in New York. The next year it was included on Connie Francis' album Connie Francis Sings Second Hand Love.

== Song background ==
The song was the flipside of Francis' hit single "Breakin' in a Brand New Broken Heart", which peaked at number seven on the U.S. pop chart. "Someone Else's Boy" was Francis' first collaboration with songwriter, arranger and band leader Cliff Parman (who wrote - among others - Nat King Cole's "Pretend"). The international success of "Someone Else's Boy" prompted Francis to work with Parman on several singles and three albums throughout 1961. Although "Someone Else's Boy" was overlooked in the U.S. and didn't chart, it became one of Francis' greatest international successes. It is the only song in her repertoire she recorded in eight languages:

- English
- German (as Schöner fremder Mann)
- French (as Celui que je veux)
- Italian (as Ti conquistero)
- Spanish (as El novio de otra, a. k. a. Mi tonto amor)
- Portuguese (as Um amor so meu)
- Dutch (as Jij bent niet van mij)
- Japanese (as 夢のデイト - Yume no Deito).

At least five of these versions hit number one in their respective countries. In West Germany, it became her best selling German-language recording to this date. The Dutch version, however, remained unreleased until 1988.

A cover in Swedish, "Han är inte min" was recorded in October 1961 by Anna-Lena Löfgren.
