= Catch Me =

Catch Me may refer to:

- Catch Me! (Joe Pass album), 1963
- "Catch Me" (Jeri Lynne Fraser song), a 1960 song written by Sid Tepper and Roy C. Bennett and covered by Cliff Richard
- "Catch Me" (Miho Nakayama song), 1987
- "Catch Me (I'm Falling)", a 1987 song by Pretty Poison
- Catch Me (TVXQ album), 2012
  - "Catch Me" (TVXQ song), 2012
- "Catch Me", song by Yellow Claw from the 2015 album Blood for Mercy
- "Catch Me", song by Demi Lovato from her album Here We Go Again
- "Catch Me", song by Nicki Minaj included as a bonus track on the 2010 album Pink Friday
- Steal My Heart (film), a South Korean film also known as Catch Me
