= Vic Dana =

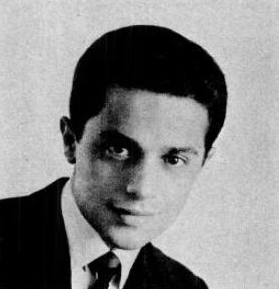
- Vic Dana in 1966

Background information
- Born: Samuel Mendola; August 26, 1942 (age 83); Buffalo, New York, U.S.
- Genres: Traditional pop
- Occupations: Singer, dancer, actor
- Labels: Dolton, Liberty, Sunset

Samuel Mendola (born August 26, 1942), known professionally as Vic Dana, is an American singer, dancer and actor.

== Biography ==
Discovered by Sammy Davis Jr., Dana was an excellent male dancer, particularly in tap, and was encouraged by Davis to move to Los Angeles to further his career. With the decline of dancing as a form of entertainment, Dana began a singing career. He is best known for his 1965 Billboard Top Ten hit recording of the Sid Tepper and Roy C. Bennett song "Red Roses for a Blue Lady". His album of the same title made it into the Top 20. Preceding this success as a solo artist, Dana was the lead singer of The Fleetwoods (for live performances only), replacing original vocalist Gary Troxel when Troxel went into the U.S. Navy.

Other hit recordings on the Billboard Hot 100 chart in the 1960s: "Little Altar Boy", "I Will", "More", "Shangri-La", "I Love You Drops", and "If I Never Knew Your Name". "I Love You Drops" was written and recorded by country singer Bill Anderson, and was popular enough to be recorded by others including Don Cherry and Teresa Brewer. He also scored a chart record in 1970 with Neil Diamond's "Red Red Wine", years before it was turned into a UK number one hit by UB40. His last nationally charted record was Larry Weiss' "Lay Me Down (Roll Me Out To Sea)" on the Casino label, which hit the top 20 on Billboard's Adult Contemporary survey.

Six Dana songs reached the Music Vendor (later Record World) chart without appearing in the Billboard chart.

Dana had a brief foray as an actor on three TV appearances, first in 1965 on the series Burke's Law in the episode "Who Killed Wimbledon Hastings?" as Forrest Shea, and then in 1966 on the WWII drama Combat! in the episode "Ask Me No Questions" as Pvt. James. He also appeared in the 1968 television movie Shadow Over Elveron as Tino.

== Personal life ==
Dana has three children, Steven, Jason and Justin. Dana retired from the entertainment industry and now resides in Paducah, Kentucky. Vic was married to Kelly Dana, formerly Kelly Riley. Kelly and Vic were married for 21 years before Kelly died suddenly in 2021.

== Discography ==
=== Albums ===
Year	Album	Peak positions	
Year	Album	US BB	US CB
1962	This Is Vic Dana	—	—
1962	Warm & Wild	—	—
1963	More	111	48
1964	Shangri-La	116	49
1964	Vic Dana Now!	—	—
1965	Red Roses for a Blue Lady	13	13
1965	Moonlight and Roses	—	—
1966	Crystal Chandelier	—	—
1966	Viva! Vic Dana	—	—
1966	Town & Country	—	—
1966	Golden Greats	—	—
1966	Warm & Wonderful	—	—
1966	Little Altar Boy and Other Christmas Songs	—	—
1967	Foreign Affairs	—	—
1967	On the Country Side	—	—
1970	If I Never Knew Your Name	—	—

=== Singles ===
Year	Single (A-side, B-side) Both sides from same album except where indicated	Chart positions						Album
Year	Single (A-side, B-side) Both sides from same album except where indicated	US BB	US CB	US AC	CA	CA AC	AUS	Album
1961	"The Girl of My Dreams" b/w "Someone New" (from This Is Vic Dana)	—	—	—	—	—	—	Non-album tracks
1961	"Golden Boy" b/w "The Story Behind My Tears"	—	—	—	—	—	—	Non-album tracks
1961	"Little Altar Boy" /	45	42	—	—	—	—	This Is Vic Dana
1961	"Hello, Roommate"	—	—	—	—	—	48	Non-album track
1962	"I Will" b/w "Proud" (Non-album track)	47	42	12	—	—	31	More
1962	"(A Girl Needs) to Love and Be Loved" b/w "Time Can Change"	102	—	—	—	—	—	Non-album tracks
1962	"A Very Good Year for Girls" b/w "Looking for Me"	—	—	—	—	—	40	Non-album tracks
1963	"Danger" b/w "Heart, Hand and Teardrop"	96	76	—	—	—	39	Non-album tracks
1963	"More" b/w "That's Why I'm Sorry"	42	18	10	—	—	—	More
1963	"The Prisoner's Song" b/w "A Voice in the Wind"	—	143	—	—	—	—	Non-album tracks
1963	"Close Your Eyes" b/w "So Wide the Wind"	—	—	—	—	—	—	Non-album tracks
1964	"Shangri-La" b/w "Warm and Tender" (Non-album track)	27	9	8	—	—	18	Shangri-La
1964	"Love Is All We Need" b/w "I Need You Now" (Non-album track)	53	63	7	—	—	—	Golden Greats
1964	"Garden in the Rain" b/w "Stairway to the Stars" (from Shangri-La)	97	90	13	—	—	—	Golden Greats
1964	"Frenchy" b/w "It Was Night (Foi A Noite)"	—	129	—	—	—	—	Vic Dana Now!
1965	"Red Roses for a Blue Lady" b/w "Blue Ribbons (For Her Curls)" (Non-album track)	10	11	2	—	—	8	Red Roses for a Blue Lady
1965	"Bring a Little Sunshine (To My Heart)" b/w "That's All" (from Warm & Wonderful)	66	64	20	—	—	91	Golden Greats
1965	"Moonlight and Roses (Bring Memories of You)" b/w "What'll I Do"	51	54	5	—	—	—	Moonlight and Roses
1965	"Crystal Chandelier" b/w "What Now My Love (Et Maintenant)" (from Viva)	51	53	14	19	14	34	Crystal Chandelier
1966	"Lovey Kravezit" b/w "Hello Roommate" (from On the Country Side)	—	—	—	—	—	—	Non-album tracks
1966	"I Love You Drops" b/w "Sunny Skies"	30	42	20	28	—	40	Town & Country
1966	"A Million and One" b/w "My Baby Wouldn't Leave Me" (from Town & Country)	71	69	24	—	—	88	Non-album tracks
1966	"Distant Drums" b/w "Love Me with All Your Heart" (from Viva)	114	92	33	—	—	—	On the Country Side
1966	"Grown Up Games" b/w "So What's New?"	—	127	—	—	—	—	Non-album tracks
1967	"A Lifetime Lovin' You" b/w "Guess Who, You"	—	—	—	—	—	—-	Non-album tracks
1967	"Fraulein" b/w "A Little Bit Later on Down the Line"	—	138	—	—	—	—	On the Country Side
1968	"Little Arrows" b/w "Roses Are Red"	—	—	—	—	—	—	Non-album tracks
1969	"You Are My Destiny" b/w "Where Has All the Love Gone"	—	133	—	—	—	—	Non-album tracks
1969	"Look of Leavin'" b/w "Loneliness (Is Messin' Up My Mind)"	—	—	—	—	—	—	Non-album tracks
1969	"I Tried To Love You Today" b/w "Aren't We The Lucky Ones"	—	—	—	—	—	—	Non-album tracks
1970	"If I Never Knew Your Name" b/w "Sad Day Song"	47	39	14	43	5	—	If I Never Knew Your Name
1970	"Red Red Wine" b/w "Another Dream Shot Down"	72	94	30	—	—	—	If I Never Knew Your Name
1970	"You Gave Me a Reason (To Believe)" b/w "It Won't Hurt to Try It"	—	—	—	—	—	—	Non-album tracks
1971	"Angel She Was Love" b/w "If You Think I Love You Now (I've Just Started)"	—	—	—	—	—	—	Non-album tracks
1971	"The Love in Your Eyes" b/w "Child of Mine"	—	—	—	—	—	—	Non-album tracks
1975	"Memories Can't Make Love to Me" b/w "Best I Ever Had"	—	—	—	—	—	—	Non-album tracks
1976	"Lay Me Down (Roll Me Out to Sea)" b/w "You Never Really Know"	—	—	14	—	—	—	Non-album tracks
