= Wonderful to Be Young =

1962 single by Cliff Richard and the Shadows

Single by Cliff Richard and the Shadows

from the album Wonderful to Be Young
- B-side: "Got a Funny Feeling"
- Released: September 1962
- Recorded: 20 July 1962
- Studio: EMI Studios, London
- Genre: Pop
- Length: 2:39
- Label: Dot
- Songwriters: Hal David; Burt Bacharach
- Producer: Norrie Paramor

Cliff Richard and the Shadows singles chronology
"It'll Be Me" (1962)	"Wonderful to Be Young" (1962)	"The Next Time" (1962)

"Wonderful to Be Young" is a song written by Burt Bacharach and Hal David and released as a single by Cliff Richard and the Shadows in September 1962, from their album Wonderful to Be Young.

== Background and release ==
For release in North America, Paramount Pictures decided to retitle and re-edit the film The Young Ones, in which Richard stars. A new opening sequence was commissioned as well as a new title song. With the film retitled Wonderful to Be Young!, songwriting duo Bacharach and David wrote the title track and it was recorded by Cliff Richard and the Shadows at EMI Studios, (later renamed Abbey Road Studios) and features piano by Max Harris and female backing vocals by the Mike Sammes Singers.

"Wonderful to Be Young" was only released as a single in the US and Canada, with the B-side "Got a Funny Feeling", written by the Shadows' Hank Marvin and Bruce Welch, which was previously released as the B-side to "When the Girl in Your Arms Is the Girl in Your Heart". The original version of "Wonderful to Be Young" has never been released in the UK; however, a remixed version was released on the 1964 EP A Forever Kind of Love, retitled "It's a Wonderful Life", and several different versions have been released since.

== Alternative version ==
In 2008, an alternative arrangement recorded by Cliff Richard was released by Rhino Records on Magic Moments - The Definitive Burt Bacharach Collection. In this arrangement, Richard changes the melody notes and chord harmony of the 24th measure of the song (where he sings the words "lead me"), playing a playing a V chord instead of the ♭VII7 chord indicated by Bacharach in the published sheet music and used for the originally released version. Richard makes other minor changes in the alternate arrangement, including waiting until the second measure to switch to the iii chord, and playing a V chord instead of a IV chord in measure 27 (where he sings "want me"). The alternative version can be identified by the lack of background singers, who appear on the original arrangement used in the production of the Wonderful to Be Young motion picture. On the Rhino Records release of the alternative arrangement, prior to the beginning of the performance, a record producer can be heard stating that the recording is "take 14".

== Track listing ==
1. "Wonderful to Be Young" – 2:39
2. "Got a Funny Feeling" – 2:54

== Personnel ==
- Cliff Richard – vocals
- Hank Marvin – lead guitar
- Bruce Welch – rhythm guitar
- Brian Locking – bass guitar
- Tony Meehan – drums
- Max Harris – piano
- The Mike Sammes Singers – backing vocals

== Charts ==
Chart (1962–63)	Peak position
Canada (Toronto CHUM)	16
Canada (Vancouver CFUN)	21
US Music Vendor Heading for the Top 100	35
