= Listen to Cliff! =

Studio album by Cliff Richard
- Released: 14 April 1961
- Length: 39:51
- Label: Columbia
- Producer: Norrie Paramor

Cliff Richard chronology
Me and My Shadows (1960)	Listen to Cliff! (1961)	21 Today (1961)

Listen to Cliff! is the third studio album by singer Cliff Richard and fourth album overall. It was released through EMI Columbia Records in April 1961. The album reached No. 2 in the UK album chart, charting for 26 consecutive weeks and re-entering twice.

Recorded at Abbey Road Studios, no singles were officially released from the album. None of the 1961 single releases are available on this album. The album mainly features covers of musicals and popular 1930s and 40s songs. "Blue Moon" was issued as an export single. Tony Meehan was used as a session drummer with the Norrie Paramor orchestra.

== Re-release ==
This album was then re-marketed on the EP format into 2 EPs:

- Listen to Cliff no.1 (mono)
- Listen to Cliff no.2 (mono)

== Track listing ==
Side one
No.	Title	Writer(s)	Length
1.	"What'd I Say [with The Shadows]"	Ray Charles	3:03
2.	"Blue Moon"	Lorenz Hart, Richard Rodgers	3:32
3.	"True Love Will Come to You [with The Shadows]"	Peter Chester, Bruce Welch	2:58
4.	"Lover"	Lorenz Hart, Richard Rodgers	1:49
5.	"Unchained Melody [with The Shadows]"	Alex North, Hy Zaret	3:30
6.	"Idle Gossip"	Floyd Huddleston, Joseph Meyer	2:54
7.	"First Lesson in Love [with The Shadows]"	Peter Chester, Bruce Welch	1:56
8.	"Almost Like Being in Love"	Alan Jay Lerner, Frederick Loewe	2:05

Side two
No.	Title	Writer(s)	Length
1.	"Beat out Dat Rhythm on a Drum"	Georges Bizet, Oscar Hammerstein II	1:59
2.	"Memories Linger On [with The Shadows]"	Peter Chester, Bruce Welch	2:40
3.	"Temptation"	Nacio Herb Brown, Arthur Freed	2:24
4.	"I Live for You [with The Shadows]"	Peter Chester, Bruce Welch	2:15
5.	"Sentimental Journey"	Les Brown, Bud Green, Ben Homer	2:09
6.	"I Want You to Know [with The Shadows]"	Dave Bartholomew, Fats Domino	2:29
7.	"We Kiss in a Shadow"	Oscar Hammerstein II, Richard Rodgers	3:23
8.	"It's You [with The Shadows]"	Peter Chester, Bruce Welch	3:22

CD reissue bonus tracks
No.	Title	Writer(s)	Length
17.	"True Love Will Come to You"	Peter Chester, Bruce Welch	2:42
18.	"I Want You to Know"	Dave Bartholomew, Fats Domino	2:24

== Release formats ==
- Vinyl LP mono & stereo
- Reel to Reel Tape.(?) mono.
- CD mono
- CD mono/stereo

== Personnel ==
Cliff Richard and the Shadows

- Cliff Richard – lead vocals
- Hank Marvin – lead guitar
- Bruce Welch – rhythm guitar
- Jet Harris – bass guitar
- Tony Meehan – drums

Production

- Produced by Norrie Paramor
- Engineered by Malcolm Addey
