= Connie Francis Sings "Second Hand Love" =

Studio album by Connie Francis
- Released: June 1962
- Recorded: 1961
- Genre: Easy listening
- Length: 32:02
- Label: MGM
- Producer: Arnold Maxin

Connie Francis chronology
Connie Francis sings Fun Songs For Children (1962)	Connie Francis Sings "Second Hand Love" (1962)	Country Music – Connie Style (1962)

Singles from Connie Francis Sings "Second Hand Love"
- 1. "Breakin' in a Brand New Broken Heart" / "Someone Else's Boy" Released: April 1961; 2. "Together" / "Too Many Rules" Released: June 1961; 3. "(He's My) Dreamboat" Released: September 1961; 4. "When the Boy in Your Arms (Is the Boy in Your Heart)" / "Baby's First Christmas" Released: November 1961; 5. "Don't Break the Heart That Loves You" Released: January 1962; 6. "Second Hand Love" Released: April 1962; 7. "Pretty Little Baby" Released: May 16, 2025 (International versions EP)

Connie Francis Sings "Second Hand Love" (also known as Connie Francis Sings) is a 1962 studio album by American singer Connie Francis.

== Background ==
"Together" (1961) and "Don't Break the Heart That Loves You" (1962) both peaked at number one on the Easy Listening chart. The latter song became her third No. 1 hit in the US and preceded her top 10 hit, "Second Hand Love", (No. 7 in the US). these two titles were highlighted by the use of a larger font, and in color, on the album cover.

== Overview ==
All of the songs in the album were either A or B-sides, with many being hits. The album peaked at number 111 on the Billboard Top LPs chart.

== Track listing ==
Side one
No.	Title	Writer(s)	Length
1.	"Second Hand Love"	Hank Hunter; Phil Spector	2:48
2.	"Someone Else's Boy"	Athena Hosey; Hal Gordon	2:39
3.	"Together"	Buddy DeSylva; Lew Brown; Ray Henderson	2:51
4.	"Too Many Rules"	Don Stirling; Gary Temkin	2:21
5.	"(He's My) Dreamboat"	John D. Loudermilk	2:40
6.	"Gonna Git That Man"	Eddie Curtis	2:15

Side two
No.	Title	Writer(s)	Length
7.	"Don't Break the Heart That Loves You"	Benny Davis; Murray Mencher	2:58
8.	"Pretty Little Baby"	Stirling; Bill Nauman	2:15
9.	"When the Boy in Your Arms (Is the Boy in Your Heart)"	Sid Tepper; Roy C. Bennett	2:40
10.	"It Happened Last Night"	Earl Wilson; Leonard Whitcup; Earl Wilson Jr.	2:30
11.	"Baby's First Christmas"	Davis; Mencher	2:20
12.	"Breakin' in a Brand New Broken Heart"	Howard Greenfield; Jack Keller	2:35

== Charts ==
Chart (1962)	Peak position
US Billboard 200	111
