= Hollywood (Connie Francis song) =

Single by Connie Francis

from the album Rocksides (1957-1964)
- B-side: "(He's My) Dreamboat"
- Released: September 1961
- Recorded: August 12, 1961
- Studio: Bradley Film & Recording Studio, Nashville, Tennessee
- Genre: Country-pop; rock 'n' roll
- Length: 2:20
- Label: MGM; K13039
- Songwriter: John D. Loudermilk
- Producer: Jim Vienneau

Connie Francis singles chronology
"Together" (1961)	"Hollywood" (1961)	"When the Boy in Your Arms" (1961)

Audio
- "Hollywood" on YouTube

Professional ratings
Review scores
Source	Rating
Billboard	Positive (Spotlight)
Cashbox	Positive (Pick of the Week)

"Hollywood" is a song written by country singer John D. Loudermilk and most notably performed by Connie Francis, who released it as a single under MGM Records in late 1961, with a positive reception and a moderate chart presence. The song was included in Francis' 1987 Rocksides and 2005 Gold albums.

== Connie Francis version ==
=== Release and reception ===
Following the success of "Together" Francis would release "Hollywood" as a seven inch single in September 1961 under MGM Records. It was backed by a slower ballad, "(He's My) Dreamboat" on the B-side, which was included in her 1962 album Connie Francis Sings "Second Hand Love". Cliff Parman conducted the orchestra for both songs, which were recorded on August 12, 1961. The producer was Jim Vienneau, although uncredited in the original release.

The single was met with a positive critical reception upon its release. Billboard magazine said that "Here are two sock sides by the best-selling thursh," believing "Hollywood" has a "slight edge, they called it a "bluesy rhythm-rocker with good teen-appeal lyrics." Cashbox reviewed the single in mid September and wrote that Francis comes up "with two newcomers that have what it takes to ride side-by-side upt he sales ladder," adding that "Hollywood" is a sensational shuffle-rocker 'bout a swinging cat named 'Hollywood,'" concluding that there's "Top-notch assist from Cliff Parman's ork-chorus on both stands."

=== Chart performance ===
"Hollywood" debuted on the Billboard Hot 100 on September 25, 1961, reaching No. 42 during a seven-week run. The single was ranked higher on the Cashbox Top 100 Singles, where it reached the top-40 and peaked at No. 25. Simiraly, on the Music Vendor 100 Top Pop singles chart, where it reached No. 20. Internationally, the song became a hit as well. "Hollywood" reached No. 27 in Australia. It peaked at No. 14 on the Canadian CHUM Chart at this time.

The single's B-side, "He's My Dreambot", outperformed "Hollywood". It reached No. 14 on Billboard, No. 22 on Cashbox, and No. 15 on Record World.

=== Track listing ===
7" single (MGM K13039, 1961)
No.	Title	Writer(s)	Performance rights handled by	Length
1.	"Hollywood"	John D. Loudermilk	Broadcast Music, Inc.	2:20
2.	"(He's My) Dreamboat"	John D. Loudermilk	Broadcast Music, Inc.	2:40

== Charts ==
Chart performance for "Hollywood"
Chart (1961)	Peak position
US Billboard Hot 100	42
US Cashbox Top 100 Singles	26
US Music Vendor 100 Top Pops	20
Australia Kent Music Report	27
Canada CHUM Chart	14
