= Baby's First Christmas =

Single by Connie Francis

from the album Christmas in My Heart
- A-side: "When the Boy in Your Arms (Is the Boy in Your Heart)" (US)
- B-side: "I'm Falling In Love With You Tonight" (UK, India, Netherlands)
- Released: November 1961
- Recorded: November 2, 1961, New York City
- Genre: Pop
- Length: 2:20
- Label: MGM; K13051
- Songwriters: Benny Davis; Murray Mencher
- Producer: Arnold Maxin

Connie Francis singles chronology
"Hollywood" (1961)	"Baby's First Christmas" (1961)	"Don't Break the Heart That Loves You" (1962)

Professional ratings
Review scores
Source	Rating
Cashbox	Positive (Pick of the Week)

"Baby's First Christmas" is a song written by Benny Davis and Murray Mencher (using the pseudonym Ted Murry) and most notably performed by Connie Francis, who released it as a single under MGM Records in late 1961, with a positive reception and a moderate chart presence. The song was included in Francis' reissues of her 1959 Christmas album, as well as the 2005 Gold compilation.

== Connie Francis version ==
=== Release and reception ===
Following the success of "Hollywood" Francis would release "Baby's First Christmas" as a seven inch single in September 1961 under MGM Records. It was backed by a Christmas ballad, "Baby's First Christmas" on the B-side, which was included in her reissue of Christmas in My Heart. Don Costa conducted the orchestra for both songs, which were recorded on November 2, 1961. The producer was Arnold Maxin, MGM's president at the time.

The single was met with a positive critical reception upon its release. Cashbox reviewed the single in mid November and believed that "The charming lilter, 'Baby’s First Christmas,' also has what it takes for chartdom—as soon as the season rolls around."

=== Chart performance ===
"Baby's First Christmas" debuted on the Billboard Hot 100 on December 11, 1961, reaching No. 26 during a five-week run. Similarly, on the Music Vendor 100 Top Pop singles chart, where it reached No. 22. The single was ranked much lower on the Cashbox Top 100 Singles, where it only reached No. 52. The single debuted on the Billboard Easy Listening in the issue dated December 11, 1961, peaking at No. 7 in January 1962 during a four-week run on the chart. Internationally, the song became a hit as well. "Baby's First Christmas" reached No. 30 in the UK. It peaked at No. 10 on the Canadian CHUM Chart at this time. In December 1962, the single reappeared on the charts at No. 113 in the US. In December 1965, it reached the Billboard Christmas Singles chart at No. 13.

The single's A-side, "When the Boy in Your Arms (Is the Boy in Your Heart)", outperformed "Baby's First Christmas". It reached No. 10 on Billboard, No. 8 on Cashbox, No. 7 on Record World, and No. 2 on the Easy Listening chart. Due to Cliff Richard's success with the same song in the UK, "Baby's First Christmas" was chosen as the A-side there, as well as in the Netherlands and India with the same reason, with "I'm Falling In Love With You Tonight" as the flip side.

=== Track listing ===
7" single (UK) (MGM K1145, 1961)
No.	Title	Writer(s)	Performance rights handled by	Length
1.	"Baby's First Christmas"	Benny Davis; Murray Mencher	ASCAP	2:20
2.	"I'm Falling In Love With You Tonight"	Benny Davis; Murray Mencher	ASCAP	2:57

== Charts ==
Chart performance for "Baby's First Christmas"
Chart (1961-1962)	Peak position
US Billboard Hot 100	26
US Cashbox Top 100 Singles	52
US Music Vendor 100 Top Pops	22
US Billboard Easy Listening	7
UK Singles Chart	30
Canada CHUM Chart	10
Chart (1965)	Peak position
US Billboard Christmas Singles	13
