= 21 Today =

1961 studio album by Cliff Richard

Studio album by Cliff Richard and The Shadows
- Released: 14 October 1961
- Recorded: September 1960 – July 1961
- Length: 40:01
- Label: Columbia; 1961 LP - 33SX 1368 (mono); 1961 SCX 3409 (stereo)
- Producer: Norrie Paramor

Cliff Richard and The Shadows chronology
Listen to Cliff! (1961)	21 Today (1961)	The Young Ones (1962)

Professional ratings
Review scores
Source	Rating
New Record Mirror	5/5

21 Today is the fourth studio album by Cliff Richard and his fifth album overall. The album features The Shadows on every track. It was released through EMI Columbia Records on 14 October 1961, the exact date of Cliff Richard's 21st birthday and was his first No. 1 in the UK album chart.

== Track listing ==
Side One
No.	Title	Writer(s)	Length
1.	"Happy Birthday to You"	Mildred J. Hill	1:38
2.	"Forty Days (To Come Back Home)"	Chuck Berry	2:49
3.	"Catch Me"	Sid Tepper, Roy C. Bennett	2:31
4.	"How Wonderful to Know"	Salvatore D'Esposito, Kermit Goell	2:42
5.	"Tough Enough"	Johnny Otis	2:18
6.	"Fifty Years for Every Kiss"	Sammy Bella	2:34
7.	"The Night Is So Lonely"	Gene Vincent, Clifton Simmons	2:46
8.	"Poor Boy"	Vern McEntire	2:59

Side Two
No.	Title	Writer(s)	Length
1.	"Y'Arriva"	Bruce Welch, Hank Marvin	3:39
2.	"Outsider"	Sid Tepper, Roy C. Bennett	2:45
3.	"Tea For Two"	Vincent Youmans, Irving Caesar	2:19
4.	"To Prove My Love for You"	Don Wolf, Ben Raleigh	1:55
5.	"Without You"	Cliff Richard, Hank Marvin, Bruce Welch	2:09
6.	"A Mighty Lonely Man"	Eddie Curtis	2:18
7.	"My Blue Heaven"	George A. Whiting, Walter Donaldson	2:31
8.	"Shame on You"	Bruce Welch, Hank Marvin, Kevin Jacobson	2:08

== Chart positions ==
Chart (1961)	Peak position
UK Albums (OCC)	1

== Release formats ==
- Vinyl LP mono & stereo (1961)
- Audio CD (1998)

== Personnel ==
Cliff Richard and the Shadows

- Cliff Richard – lead vocals
- Hank Marvin – lead guitar
- Bruce Welch – rhythm guitar
- Jet Harris – bass guitar
- Tony Meehan – drums
