= I'm Lookin' out the Window =

1959 song written by Don Raye and John Jacob Niles

Single by Peggy Lee
- A-side: "Hallelujah, I Love Him So"
- Released: April 27, 1959
- Recorded: March 28, 1959
- Studio: Capitol Tower, Los Angeles
- Genre: Pop
- Length: 2:49
- Label: Capitol
- Songwriter: Don Raye
- Producer: Dave Cavanaugh

Peggy Lee singles chronology
"Swing Low Sweet Chariot" (1959)	"Hallelujah, I Love Him So" / "I'm Lookin' out the Window" (1959)	"You Came a Long Way from St. Louis" (1959)

"I'm Lookin' out the Window" is a ballad written by Don Raye and John Jacob Niles. It was first recorded by Peggy Lee in 1959 and became best known as a hit record for Cliff Richard in 1962 in numerous countries, although not in the United States.

== Background ==
"I'm Lookin' out the Window" uses the melody from the song "Go 'Way from My Window" by John Jacob Niles. Niles wrote "Go 'Way from My Window" between 1907 and 1908. Niles' father owned a farm on which Niles worked. Alongside him, a black ditch-digger named Objerall Jacket also worked on the farm and would sing the same tune all day long, which included the line "Go way from my window, go way from my door". In the summer of 1907, Niles took this line and over the next year went on to compose several additional verses and the melody which he hoped would impress a girl he knew. In 1908, Niles offered the song to this girl but was rejected with Niles being told he was not a musician and that he should stick to farm work. Following this, the song was thrown into the storage section of a piano bench and was let untouched for almost twenty years. Niles first performed the song in December 1927 after a group of Princeton University alumni asked him to perform for an evening of folk music, and he would go on to record the song in April 1939, released on his album American Folk Lore (Volume 3) in October 1941.

There have been a number of authorship issues with "Go 'Way from My Window". It was copyright in 1934 as an unpublished manuscript by G. Schirmer, which was later published in 1944. In a 1948 article by Niles, he said that he had heard it described as a "song of Elizabethan origin", and a 1935 Catalog of Copyright Entries volume lists the writer as traditional, interpreted by Marion Kerby (whom Niles had previously performed with regularly) – a 1951 letter by Niles' wife Rena (on his behalf) to Kerby detailed the copyright infringement, requesting that Kerby credited Niles.

The issues surrounding the copyright also occurred on "I'm Lookin' out the Window". Don Raye wrote the lyrics, however, it uses the melody from "Go 'Way from My Window" but only Raye was credited on the Peggy Lee single release. On the Peggy Lee compilation album, All Aglow Again!, released the following year in 1960, only Niles is credited. For the Cliff Richard release, also only Niles is credited. However, the Songwriters Hall of Fame now credits the song to both Niles and Raye.

== Cliff Richard version ==
"I'm Lookin' out the Window"

Single by Cliff Richard with the Norrie Paramor Orchestra
- B-side: "Do You Want to Dance"
- Released: May 4, 1962
- Recorded: December 11, 1961
- Studio: EMI, London
- Length: 2:46
- Label: Columbia
- Songwriter: John Jacob Niles
- Producer: Norrie Paramor

Cliff Richard singles chronology
"The Young Ones" (1962)	"I'm Lookin' out the Window" (1962)	"Lessons in Love" (1962)

Cliff Richard recorded "I'm Lookin' out the Window" with the Norrie Paramor Orchestra for release as a single in 1962. It reached number 2 in the UK Singles Chart and was successful in numerous other countries. It was only Richard's second song released as a single without the backing of his band the Shadows (known as the Drifters on his first five singles).

The single was released in May 1962 with the B-side "Do You Want to Dance" (recorded with the Shadows). However, whilst "I'm Lookin' out the Window" was the side being plugged, it was reported by the New Record Mirror, a week after its release, that the public were buying "Do You Want to Dance" slightly more in preference. In the UK, on the Record Retailer (the canonical official chart) and Melody Maker charts, the two songs were paired together, peaking at number two. However, the New Musical Express chart allowed separate listings of B-sites, with "I'm Lookin' out the Window" peaking at number two and "Do You Want to Dance" at number ten.

=== Charts ===
Chart (1962)	Peak position
Australia (Kent Music Report)	3
Belgium (Ultratop 50 Wallonia)	9
Denmark (Quan Musikbureau)	6
Finland (Suomen virallinen lista)	18
India (The Voice, Calcutta)	1
Ireland (IRMA)	2
New Zealand (Lever Hit Parade)	2
Norway (VG-lista)	2
Sweden (Sverigetopplistan)	3
UK Disc Top 20	2
UK Melody Maker Top 30	2
UK New Musical Express Top 30	2
UK Record Retailer Top 50	2
