= Tender Years =

1961 single by George Jones

Single by George Jones

from the album Greatest Hits
- B-side: "Battle of Love"
- Released: April 1961
- Recorded: February 8, 1961
- Studio: Bradley Studios, Nashville, Tennessee
- Genre: Country
- Length: 2:30
- Label: Mercury
- Songwriters: George Jones, Darrell Edwards
- Producer: Shelby Singleton

George Jones singles chronology
"Family Bible" (1961)	"Tender Years" (1961)	"Did I Ever Tell You" (1961)

Audio
- "Tender Years" on YouTube

"Tender Years" is a song written by American country music artist George Jones and Darrell Edwards, recorded and released in 1961. It became Jones' second #1 country hit. The song also spawned two successful foreign language versions two years later in 1963, First in French by Johnny Hallyday ("Tes tendres années"), and in Dutch by singer and actress Willeke Alberti ("Spiegelbeeld"), being adapted from the former French version. Both versions have been covered by many others since.

== Background ==
"Tender Years" spent seven non consecutive weeks at #1 and a total of 32 weeks on the country chart. "Tender Years" also made it to the Hot 100, peaking at number 76. Like his previous singles "Family Bible" and "Window Up Above," the recording displayed a more mature, restrained vocal approach from the one that had established him on earlier honky tonk hits such as "Why Baby Why" and "White Lightning". In the liner notes to the 1994 Mercury compilation Cup of Loneliness: The Classic Mercury Years, country music historian Colin Escott argues that "Tender Years" "just about defined the territory he carved out as his own in the years ahead. 'Window Up Above,' 'Color of the Blues,' and 'Accidentally on Purpose' had all hinted at the same direction, but on 'Tender Years' the song, the production, and the performance came together in a statement of soon-to-be classic George Jones." Music journalist Rich Kienzle concurs, observing in his essay for The Essential George Jones: The Spirit of Country, "Here, his singing voice, which so far had been high and nasal, began to deepen. His restrained delivery and the smoother, 'Nashville Sound' production (complete with muted accompaniment and a vocal chorus) produced a smoother, but no less expressive George Jones." Years later Jones would perform the song with Faron Young and Marty Robbins during a segment on Robbins' television show (the video is available on YouTube).

The famous French singer Johnny Hallyday recorded the song during a Nashville session and afterward he recorded a French version ("Tes Tendres Années"). This French rendition was used as a basis for the 1963 Dutch hit Spiegelbeeld written by Lodewijk Post and sung by Dutch singer Willeke Alberti.

== Chart performance ==
Chart (1961)	Peak position
U.S. Billboard Hot C&W Sides	1
U.S. Billboard Hot 100	76

== Johnny Hallyday version (in French) ==
"Tes tendres années"

Single by Johnny Hallyday

from the album Les Bras en croix
- English title: Your tender years
- B-side: "Les Bras en croix"
- Released: March 1, 1963
- Recorded: February 1962
- Studio: Bradley Recording Studio, Nashville; Studio DMS, Paris
- Genre: Country, rock and roll
- Length: 2:22
- Label: Philips
- Songwriters: Ralph Bernet, Darrell Edwards
- Producer: Lee Hallyday

Johnny Hallyday singles chronology
"Elle est terrible" (1962)	"Tes tendres années" (1963)	"Les Bras en croix" / "Quitte-moi doucement" / "Quand un air vous possède" / "Quitte-moi doucement" / "Quand un air vous possède" / "Dis-moi oui" (1963)

Alternative cover

Audio
- "Tes tendres années" on YouTube

The song was covered in French by Johnny Hallyday. His version (titled "Tes tendres années") was released in March 1963 in France and reached no. 1 in the Netherlands. In Wallonia (French Belgium) his single spent 28 weeks on the chart, peaking at number 2, in Flanders (Dutch Belgium) – 12 weeks peaking at number 9. Hallyday's version would later be released in the Netherlands on July 1, 1963, four months after its initial release in France.

=== Charts ===
Chart (1963)	Peak position
Belgium (Ultratop 50 Flanders)	2
Belgium (Ultratop 50 Wallonia)	9
Netherlands (Single Top 100)	1

== Sylvie Vartan version ==
"Tes tendres années"

Single by Sylvie Vartan

from the album Sessions acoustiques
- B-side: "Sur tes lèvres"
- Released: September 11, 1993 (live version / single); 1994 (studio version)
- Recorded: June 14, 1993 (live version / single)
- Venue: Parc des Princes (live version / single)
- Genre: A capella (live version / single); Chanson (album version)
- Label: Philips
- Songwriters: Ralph Bernet, Darrell Edwards

Sylvie Vartan singles chronology
"Qui tu es" (1992)	"Tes tendres années" (1993)	"Moi je Pense Encore A Toi" (1994)

Music video
- "Tes tendres années" (Live) on YouTube

In 1993, Hallyday held three concerts at the Parc des Princes, the occasion for a few duets with relatives of the singers, Michel Sardou, Eddy Mitchell, but also his son David Hallyday and his ex-wife Sylvie Vartan. Since their divorce in 1980, this is the first time that the couple has been reunited on stage 13 years since their divorce, coinciding with Hallyday's fiftieth birthday. Vartan (who performs two duet titles), for her entrance on stage, sang the song in front of Johnny; a very noted and acclaimed a capella interpretation which leaves a lasting impression. Vartan's version was released as a CD single a few months later and recorded the song in the studio in 1994, in a new version, this time acoustic, similar to Hallyday's.

=== Charts ===
Chart (1993)	Peak position
France (SNEP)	18

== Willeke Alberti version (in Dutch) ==
"Spiegelbeeld"

Single by Willeke Alberti

from the album Willeke Internationaal
- Language: Dutch
- English title: Reflection
- B-side: "Toen Je Me Kuste"
- Released: November 1963
- Recorded: Summer–winter 1963
- Genre: Pop, schlager
- Length: 2:24
- Label: Philips
- Songwriters: Ralph Bernet, Lodewijk Post

Willeke Alberti singles chronology
"Nee Jongen, Ik Trouw Niet Met Jou" (1963)	"Spiegelbeeld" (1963)	"De Winter Was Lang" (1964)

Music video
- "Spiegelbeeld" on YouTube

In late 1963, the song was covered in Dutch by Willeke Alberti, daughter of Willy Alberti. Her version (titled "Spiegelbeeld", meaning "Reflection") was adapted from Johnny Hallyday's French version (which was a number one hit in the with Netherlands earlier that year), with Dutch lyrics written by Lodewijk Post in a Pop-schlager rendition. The song peaked at number 2 in the Dutch charts in early 1964, one position lower than the performance of Hallyday's French version. The single's b-side is a Dutch adaption of the Crystals's "And Then He Kissed Me", titled "Toen Je Me Kuste" ("When you kissed me")

=== Charts ===
Chart (1963–1964)	Peak position
Netherlands (Dutch Top 40)	2
