= Second Hand Love (song) =

Single by Connie Francis

from the album Connie Francis Sings "Second Hand Love"
- B-side: "Gonna Git That Man"
- Released: April 1962
- Recorded: 1962
- Genre: Country pop
- Length: 2:48
- Label: MGM
- Songwriter(s): Phil Spector, Hank Hunter

Connie Francis singles chronology
"Don't Break the Heart That Loves You" (1962)	"Second Hand Love" (1962)	"Vacation" (1962)

"Second Hand Love" is a popular song written by Phil Spector and Hank Hunter and performed by American entertainer Connie Francis, reaching #7 on the Billboard Hot 100 in 1962.

== Charts ==
Chart (1962)	Peak position
Canada (CHUM Chart)	20
US Billboard Hot 100	7
US Adult Contemporary (Billboard)	3
