= The Lord Chamberlain Regrets =

The Lord Chamberlain Regrets is a musical revue with music by John Pritchett and both book and lyrics by Peter Myers and Ronald Cass. Cass also wrote some music for the show. Alec Grahame made alterations to the book after its premiere in Newcastle in 1961 in preparation for its transfer to the West End. The revue satirises the British government's censorship of the theatre by depicting a series of comedic sketches being rejected by the office of the Lord Chamberlain, and then their modified versions being performed before the audience.

== History ==
The revue originated with the show entitled Green Room Rag which played briefly at the Adelphi Theatre in May 1960. This production included a section entitled "The Lord Chamberlain Regrets", which featured material by Pritchett, Myers, Grahame, and Cass that had previously been censored by the office of the Lord Chamberlain. From this sketch the larger revue evolved. The Lord Chamberlain Regrets premiered at the Theatre Royal, Newcastle, on 12 June 1961. The production was directed by Ronnie Stevens, choreographed by Eleanor Fazan, with designs by Harry Cordwell.

The Lord Chamberlain Regrets played at the Manchester Opera House, Streatham Hill Theatre, Golders Green Hippodrome, and Theatre Royal, Brighton, the following month. During its tour through the British provinces a couple of its sketches were banned by the censors, and one in particular drew heavy backlash from Empire Loyalists. Sketches that centered on the Prince of Wales, Jackie Kennedy, and President de Gaulle were suppressed.

The show opened in London's West End at the Saville Theatre on 23 August 1961. The cast was led by Millicent Martin, Ronnie Stevens, and Joan Sims. It ran for 220 performances. Supporting cast members included Barrie Gosney, Josephine Gordon, Gordon Clyde, David Morton, Aubrey Woods, Barbara Robinson, Peter Gardner, and Joan Palethorpe. A cast recording of the show was released in 1961 on Pye Records.

In 2004 the book The Lord Chamberlain Regrets... : A History of British Theatre Censorship by Dominic Shellard, Steve Nicholson, and Miriam Handley was published by the British Library. Its title references this revue.
