= Crystal Chandelier =

1965 single by Carl Belew

Single by Carl Belew

from the album Twelve Shades of Belew
- B-side: "Lonely Hearts Do Foolish Things"
- Released: 1965
- Genre: Country
- Length: 2:50
- Label: RCA Victor
- Songwriter: Ted Harris
- Producer: Chet Atkins

Carl Belew singles chronology
"In the Middle of a Memory" (1964)	"Crystal Chandelier" (1965)	"Boston Jail" (1966)

"Crystal Chandelier"

Single by Vic Dana

from the album Crystal Chandelier
- B-side: "What Now My Love"
- Released: December 1965
- Genre: Adult Contemporary
- Label: Dolton
- Songwriter: Ted Harris

Vic Dana singles chronology
"Moonlight and Roses (Bring Mem'ries of You)" (1965)	"Crystal Chandelier" (1965)	"I Love You Drops" (1966)

"Crystal Chandeliers"

Song by Charley Pride

from the album The Country Way
- Released: December 1967
- Recorded: 1967
- Genre: Country
- Length: 2:47
- Label: RCA
- Songwriter: Ted Harris
- Producers: Chet Atkins, Jack Clement, Felton Jarvis

"Crystal Chandelier" (more commonly known as Crystal Chandeliers) is a 1965 Country song written by Ted Harris and popularized by Charley Pride. The original rendition was sung by Carl Belew. His version reached number 12 on the U.S. Billboard Country chart. It was the first of three charting singles from Belew's eighth studio album, Twelve Shades of Belew.

== Vic Dana cover ==
Vic Dana covered the song in 1965. His version reached number 51 on the U.S. Billboard Hot 100, number 19 on the Canadian pop singles chart and number 14 on both the U.S. and Canadian Adult Contemporary charts in early 1966. He also reached number 34 in Australia.

Both Carl Belew and Vic Dana recorded the song under the title "Crystal Chandelier," however, all further covers used the title: Crystal Chandeliers in the plural, reflecting what is said in the lyrics.

=== Chart history ===
Chart (1965)	Peak position
Australia (Kent Music Report)	34
Canada RPM Adult Contemporary	14
Canada RPM Top Singles	19
U.S. Billboard Hot 100	51
U.S. Billboard Easy Listening	14
U.S. Cash Box Top 100	53

== Charley Pride cover ==
Charley Pride covered "Crystal Chandeliers" in 1967. The song was included on his number-one selling album, The Country Way. It was produced by Chet Atkins, who had also produced Belew's original rendition.

Pride's version became an instant hit, and received heavy airplay by Country radio stations. Although it was never a hit on the American singles charts, it remains one of the most recognizable and enduring versions of the song.

== Other versions ==
- Tony and the Graduates covered the song in 1967, reaching number seven in Ireland.
- Billie Jo Spears covered "Crystal Chandelier" in 1970 on her Country Girl LP.
- Mattie Fox and the Country Blue Boys version reached number 14 in Ireland in 1973.
