= Songs from Heathcliff =

1995 studio album by Cliff Richard

Studio album by Cliff Richard
- Released: 30 October 1995
- Recorded: 1994–1995
- Studio: Moonee Ponds, Los Angeles; Abbey Road, London; CTS, London
- Genre: Musical theatre; pop; rock
- Length: 47:07
- Label: EMI
- Producer: John Farrar

Cliff Richard chronology
The Hit List (1994)	Songs from Heathcliff (1995)	At the Movies 1959–1974 (1996)

Singles from Songs from Heathcliff
- 1. "Misunderstood Man" Released: 9 October 1995; 2. "Had to Be" Released: 27 November 1995; 3. "The Wedding (I Do Not Love You Isabella)" Released: 18 March 1996; 4. "Be with Me Always" Released: 13 January 1997

Professional ratings
Review scores
Source	Rating
AllMusic	2/5 stars

Songs from Heathcliff is a studio album by English singer Cliff Richard, released in October 1995. It features ten songs from Richard's self-conceived musical Heathcliff, in which Richard played the title character. The musical is based on the Emily Brontë novel Wuthering Heights. The music was composed by John Farrar with lyrics written by Tim Rice. Olivia Newton-John is a guest on the album, featuring in five duets with Richard. The style of the music ranges from pop/rock to mock-period music, featuring instruments such as the harpsichord and violin.

== Background ==
According to Richard in the album's liner notes, despite the fact that he "was no great shakes at anything remotely academic" at school, "the story of Wuthering Heights has stayed embedded in my mind since those early English lessons, and its central character, Heathcliff, forever captured my imagination."

== Singles ==
Four singles were released from the album. The lead single, "A Misunderstood Man", peaked on debut at number 19 in the UK Singles Chart, but suffered from a lack of airplay on radio (including from BBC Radio 2) and television. The second single, "Had to Be", a duet with Olivia Newton-John, reached number 22. The third single, "The Wedding", a duet with Helen Hobson, reached number 40. "The Wedding" is a retitle of the album track "I Do Not Love You Isabella (Heathcliff's Wedding Song)" which features Richard in duet with Olivia Newton-John and Kristina Nichols. The fourth single, "Be with Me Always" was not released until January 1997 and it only reached number 52.

== Track listing ==
All tracks written by John Farrar and Tim Rice.

No.	Title	Length
1.	"A Misunderstood Man"	5:09
2.	"Sleep of the Good"	4:17
3.	"Gypsy Bundle"	3:59
4.	"Had to Be" (featuring Olivia Newton-John)	4:14
5.	"When You Thought of Me"	5:06
6.	"Dream Tomorrow" (featuring Olivia Newton-John)	5:17
7.	"I Do Not Love You Isabella (Heathcliff's Wedding Song)" (featuring Olivia Newton-John and Kristina Nichols)	4:29
8.	"Choosing When It's Too Late" (featuring Olivia Newton-John)	4:00
9.	"Marked with Death" (featuring Olivia Newton-John)	5:30
10.	"Be with Me Always"	5:06

== Personnel ==
Adapted from the album's liner notes.

=== Musicians ===
- Cliff Richard – vocals (all tracks)
- Olivia Newton-John – vocals (tracks 4, 6–9)
- Sean Callery – keyboards, Synclavier, orchestrations
- Liz Constantino – backing vocals
- Linda Dalziel – backing vocals
- Tommy Emmanuel – acoustic guitar (track 4)
- John Farrar – Synclavier, guitar, backing vocals
- Gary Grant – horn section
- Jerry Hey – horn section, horn arrangement (track 5)
- Dan Higgins – horn section
- Steve Kipner – backing vocals
- John "Juke" Logan – harmonica (track 5)
- Clif Magness – backing vocals
- Kristina Nichols – vocals (track 7), backing vocals
- Bill Reichenbach Jr. – horn section
- Bob Sabellico – additional drum programming
- Heather Sabellico – additional vocals (track 3)
- Leland Sklar – bass guitar (track 4)
- Michael Thompson – guitar

=== Technical ===
- John Farrar – producer
- Ivy Skoff – production co-ordinator
- James Collins – recording engineer; assisted by Caroline Daniel
- Chris Fogel – recording engineer, mixing (tracks 1, 3–5, 7, 9, 10)
- Darren Godwin – recording engineer; assisted by Guy Massey
- Eric Rudd – recording engineer
- Joe Schiff – recording engineer
- Allen Sides – mixing (tracks 1, 4, 7, 10)
- Elliot Scheiner – mixing (tracks 2, 6, 8)
- Wally Traugott – mastering
- Recorded at Moonee Ponds (Los Angeles), Abbey Road (London), CTS (London)
- Mixed at Moonee Ponds (Los Angeles)
- Mastered at Capitol (Los Angeles)
- Sleeve concept by Imagination
- Lisa Hooley – cover photography
- Pete Vernon – studio photography
- Andy Earl – photograph of Cliff Richard & Olivia Newton-John

== Charts ==
Chart performance for Songs from Heathcliff
Chart (1995)	Peak position
New Zealand Albums (RMNZ)	50
UK Albums (OCC)	15

== Certifications ==
Region	Certification	Certified units/sales
United Kingdom (BPI)	Gold	100,000^{^}
^{^} Shipments figures based on certification alone.
