= The Young Ones (song) =

1962 single by Cliff Richard and the Shadows

- Cover of the German edition

Single by Cliff Richard and the Shadows

from the album The Young Ones
- B-side: "We Say Yeah"
- Released: 5 January 1962
- Recorded: 11 August & 5 December 1961
- Studio: EMI Studios, London
- Genre: Pop
- Length: 3:11
- Label: Columbia
- Songwriters: Sid Tepper; Roy C. Bennett
- Producer: Norrie Paramor

Cliff Richard and the Shadows singles chronology
| "Outsider" (1962) | "The Young Ones" (1962) | "I'm Lookin' out the Window" (1962) |

"The Young Ones" is a single by Cliff Richard and the Shadows, released as a single in January 1962. The song, written by Sid Tepper and Roy C. Bennett, is the title song to the 1961 film The Young Ones and its soundtrack album.

== Background and recording ==
American songwriters Sid Tepper and Roy C. Bennett, who had previously written "Travellin' Light", which was a number-one hit for Richard in 1959, were commissioned by music publisher Cyril Simons to write a couple of songs, including a title song, for The Young Ones film, which at that time still lacked a title. Simons flew out to New York to give Tepper and Bennett a draft of the script, and returned two days later to find the songwriters having already written "The Young Ones". One of the other songs by Tepper and Bennett was "When the Girl in Your Arms Is the Girl in Your Heart", which wasn't written for the film, but had been offered to Richard previously and recorded by him in January 1961. With it yet to be released, Richard suggested incorporating the song in the film. Tepper and Bennett also wrote "Outsider" for the film but it was not used in the end, though was included on Richard's album 21 Today.

The film version of "The Young Ones" was recorded in May 1961 and differs from the single and album versions. This was due to a ruling at the time by the Musicians' Union where film and commercial versions of songs had to be different. The album version was recorded on 11 August 1962 at EMI Studios in London. The single release includes overdubbed strings by the Norrie Paramor Orchestra, recorded on 5 December 1961, which producer Paramor decided should be added to make it more commercial due to the use of strings in the film version.

== Release ==
Originally, Richard was dubious about the chances of "The Young Ones" being successful as a single and reluctantly agreed to its release so long as it was as a B-side. However, following the overwhelming reaction to the premiere of The Young Ones film, he changed his mind and agreed to its release as an A-side. "The Young Ones" was released as a single on 5 January 1962, backed with "We Say Yeah", written by the Shadows' Bruce Welch and Hank Marvin along with manager Peter Gormley, which was also included on The Young Ones album. Whilst the dubbed version of "The Young Ones" was released as the single in the UK, in a number of European countries the undubbed album version was released as the single.

By 3 January 1962, the single had advance orders of over 300,000 copies, and by the day of release, this figured reached 524,000 copies, becoming the first single to have advance orders of over 500,000 in the UK, overtaking Elvis Presley's "Surrender", whose advance copies were 431,000 in May 1961. By 9 January, sales of "The Young Ones" were well over 600,000. It went straight to number one in the UK, becoming the second single to do so on the Record Retailer chart (the canonical official chart) after Presley's "It's Now or Never" in 1960, and third on the New Musical Express chart (after Lonnie Donegan's "My Old Man's a Dustman" and "It's Now or Never"). On the Record Retailer chart, "The Young Ones" stayed at number one for six weeks and spent 20 weeks in the chart. It has sold 1.06 million copies in the UK, and 2.6 million worldwide.

The single was released in the US on Bigtop Records in February 1962, though failed to achieve any chart success. It was originally going to be delayed until the release date of the film in the US was known (the film was later re-edited and retitled Wonderful to Be Young for the North American release in November 1962), but after learning that a version of "The Young Ones" by American singer Cathy Carroll was due for release, Bigtop rush released Richard's version.

"The Young Ones" was later included on the Cliff Richard and the Shadows number-one EP Hits from The Young Ones, released in April 1962. The single was reissued in February 1982 as part of the Cliff box set, and a new version was produced and released as the lead single for the 2023 orchestral release on Cliff with Strings – My Kinda Life. Cliff Richard recorded a brand-new vocal track at Middle Ear Studios in Miami, Florida. The vocal sessions were engineered by Ethan Carlson and produced by Cliff Richard himself, rather than utilizing archival recordings.

== Personnel ==
- Cliff Richard – lead vocals
- Hank Marvin – lead guitar
- Bruce Welch – rhythm guitar
- Jet Harris – bass guitar
- Tony Meehan – drums
- Norrie Paramor Orchestra – strings (film and single versions)

== Chart performance ==
| Chart (1962) | Peak position |
|---|---|
| Australia (Music Maker, Sydney) | 1 |
| Australia (Kent Music Report) | 6 |
| Belgium (Ultratop 50 Flanders) | 4 |
| Belgium (Ultratop 50 Wallonia) | 10 |
| Canada (CHUM) | 5 |
| Denmark (Quan Musikbureau) | 1 |
| Finland (Suomen virallinen lista) | 6 |
| Germany (GfK) | 16 |
| Hong Kong | 3 |
| Ireland (Evening Herald) | 1 |
| Israel (Kol Israel) | 1 |
| Japan (Utamatic, Tokyo) | 6 |
| Netherlands (Single Top 100) | 1 |
| New Zealand (Lever Hit Parade) | 1 |
| Norway (VG-lista) | 2 |
| South Africa (Radio of South Africa) | 1 |
| Spain (Promusicae) | 1 |
| Sweden (Sverigetopplistan) | 4 |
| UK Disc Top 20 | 1 |
| UK Melody Maker Top 20 | 1 |
| UK New Musical Express Top 30 | 1 |
| UK Record Mirror Top 20 | 1 |
| UK Record Retailer Top 50 | 1 |

== In popular culture ==
In the 1980s, it became the theme song to the alternative comedy sitcom The Young Ones.

== See also ==
- List of number-one singles from the 1960s (UK)
