= Heathcliff (musical) =

Theatric musical by singer Cliff Richard

- Poster for 1997 London shows
- Music: John Farrar
- Lyrics: Tim Rice
- Book: Cliff Richard; Frank Dunlop
- Basis: Wuthering Heights by Emily Brontë
- Premiere: 16 October 1996: National Indoor Arena, Birmingham
- Productions: 1996-1997 Birmingham, Edinburgh, Manchester, London

Heathcliff is a 1996 musical conceived by and starring singer Cliff Richard based on the 1847 novel Wuthering Heights by Emily Brontë. It is focused on the character of Heathcliff and the story is adapted to fit with the musical staging and production. The musical attempted to fill some gaps in Heathcliff's personal story by expanding plot elements implied by Brontë's novel, which were included chronologically. All of the dialogue in the show is from the novel, although some parts were transposed to better fit the manner in which it was performed.

The music was composed by John Farrar with lyrics written by Tim Rice. The book is by Cliff Richard and Frank Dunlop.

As a forerunner to the theatrical presentation, in early October 1995, Richard released the first single, "A Misunderstood Man", followed later in the month by the studio album Songs from Heathcliff, consisting of ten songs from the musical, five featuring Olivia Newton-John in duets. Three more singles followed, "Had to Be" (a duet with Olivia Newton-John), "The Wedding" (a duet with Helen Hobson not on the album) and "Be with Me Always".

Rehearsals for the musical took place during the summer of 1996 in Camden, London, before moving to Earls Court 2 for production rehearsals featuring the stage sets and full band. Several public previews were held at Earls Court before the show moved to the National Indoor Arena in Birmingham.

Heathcliff opened on 16 October 1996 having raised considerable interest from the media regarding Cliff Richard playing the dark, barely civilized character; with many sources speculating that Richard could not carry off such a role. Box office records were broken for first-week ticket sales. Following the run in Birmingham, the show transferred to Edinburgh for four weeks, before returning to the National Indoor Arena for a few additional dates before Christmas. After the New Year, the show opened in the Palace Theatre, Manchester before transferring to London. The final performance was at Hammersmith Apollo, in May. Heathcliff played to audiences of close on half a million people, and broke box office records at almost every theatre at which it played.

Although the musical was not well received by critics, with one referring to it as "living dull", it was popular with Richard's fans. An advertising campaign for the show used some of the critics' quotes, such as "This Wretched Show" and "Withering Rather Than Wuthering", to contrast the opposing views of critics and fans.

The opening advance takings for the show were £8.5m, believed to be a record at the time. A cast recording of the show was released in October 1996 to coincide with the start of the tour, alongside the single "Be with Me Always".

A film recording of the show was made at the Hammersmith Apollo, the video of which stayed at the top of the charts for eight weeks.

== Background ==
Richard had long harboured the desire to play Heathcliff. In 1994, the composer John Farrar said, "I remember him [Richard] talking about this 15 years ago when I was in England." In 1991, Richard contacted Sir Tim Rice to ask him if he "would be interested in contributing to a whole album's worth of material". Richard had already lined up John Farrar and Frank Dunlop. Rice found the opportunity to provide Richard lyrics that would be in contrast to many of the lyrics and images that he had built up over his long career, "an irresistible one". By January 1994, roughly half the material was ready. The musical was originally planned to be staged late 1994 at several arenas across the UK and since its press launch in February 1994, 150,000 tickets had been sold. However, in May Heathcliff was postponed because the show would not be ready in time, and the concert bookings were retained for Richard's "The Hit List Tour".

== Plot ==
The eponymous Heathcliff is taken in, as a homeless child, by Mr Earnshaw who lives at the remote Yorkshire farmhouse, Wuthering Heights. Earnshaw's son Hindley (Jimmy Johnston) forms an instant antipathy to the wild and rebellious Heathcliff. His sister Cathy (Helen Hobson), however, finds in Heathcliff a soul mate, whose fiery passions feed her romantic nature.

Heathcliff and Cathy are inseparable and their habit of wandering unchecked on their beloved moors results in an accidental injury. This invalids Cathy for a time, requiring a stay at Thrushcross Grange, the home of the Lintons (the cultured Edgar, and his sister Isabella). This contact with a more refined world seduces Cathy, spurring her to rein in her wild passions. The dazzle of wealth broadens her horizons, and her first taste of gentility results in the careless abandonment of her relationship with Heathcliff. The possibility of a future together for them in a world that required more prudent choices be made is despaired. Her acceptance of Edgar Linton's (Darryl Knock) marriage proposal throws Heathcliff into a tormented rage. In order to avoid daily confrontation with his loss of Cathy and to punish her with his absence, he travels abroad in an effort to improve his life, to match that of her husband.

Years pass and Heathcliff returns unexpectedly having amassed the extreme wealth he had sought, as well as wide experience. Hindley Earnshaw, now master of Wuthering Heights following the death of his father, has become a drunken bully still seething with hatred for Heathcliff. Hindley and Heathcliff fight, with Heathcliff winning Wuthering Heights as the prize. Heathcliff marries Edgar's sister, Isabella (Sara Haggerty), although he does not love her. He cruelly abuses her, as Cathy's marriage to Edgar continues to torment him. Cathy dies following a gruelling childbirth, having confessed her undiminished passion for Heathcliff and her error in having given herself in marriage to Edgar, a decision which has ultimately brought misery to all concerned.

Heathcliff endures years of torment following this loss, until his own death reunites the lovers in the afterlife.

== Cast ==
Alternative poster for London

=== Cast ===
- Heathcliff – Cliff Richard
- Cathy – Helen Hobson
- Earnshaw/Hindley – Jimmy Johnston
- Edgar – Darryl Knock
- Isabella – Sara Haggerty
- Troubadour – Gordon Giltrap
- Elements – Rob Fardell, Chris Holland, Sonai Jones, Niki Kitt, Suzanne Parry
- Dancers – Gbenga Adeyemo, Andrew Carroll, Phyllida Crowley Smith, Samuel Hall, Jacqui Jameson, Richard Joseph, Lizzie Leigh, Andrea Smart, Bryn Walters
- Vocalists – David Combes, John Perry, Mick Wilson

=== Production crew ===
- Lyricist – Tim Rice
- Composer – John Farrar
- Director – Frank Dunlop (director)
- Production Design – Joe Vanek
- Lighting Designer – Andrew Bridge
- Sound Design – Mike Lowe, Colin Norfield, John James
- Production Music Director – Mike Moran
- Choreographer – Brad Jeffries
- Assistant Choreographer – Michelle Papouis
- Orchestrator – Sean Callery

== Original cast recording ==
Heathcliff Live

Cast recording
- Released: 2 December 1996
- Recorded: 10–11, 17–18 October 1996
- Venue: London Earls Court 2, NIA Birmingham
- Genre: Musical theater, Pop
- Label: EMI
- Producer: John Farrar

Cliff Richard albums chronology
At the Movies 1959–1974 (1996)	Heathcliff Live (1996)	Real as I Wanna Be (1998)

Heathcliff Live is the album of the original cast recording, released in December 1996. The album reached number 41 in the UK Albums Chart.

=== Track listing ===
Act 1:

- Overture
- A Misunderstood Man
- Funeral Cortege
- Sleep of the Good
- Gypsy Bundle
- The Grange Waltz
- Each to His Own
- Had to Be
- Mrs. Edgar Linton
- The Journey: Africa/India/China
- When You Thought of Me

Act 2:

- Overture (reprise) - Entr'acte Music
- When You Thought of Me (reprise)
- Dream Tomorrow
- Gambling Song
- I Do Not Love You Isabella (bridge)
- The Gambling Song
- I Do Not Love You Isabella
- Isabella (reprise)
- Choosing When It's Too Late
- The Madness of Cathy
- Marked with Death
- Be with Me Always
- The Nightmare
- Be with Me Always (reprise)
- A Misunderstood Man (reprise)
- Overture (reprise)
- Music for Curtain Calls

== Tour dates ==
Opening Date	Closing Date	Venue
16 October 1996	2 November 1996	National Indoor Arena, Birmingham
14 December 1996	19 December 1996	National Indoor Arena, Birmingham
5 November 1996	7 December 1996	Edinburgh Playhouse
7 January 1997	8 February 1997	Palace Theatre, Manchester
12 February 1997	17 May 1997	Hammersmith Apollo, London
