= Red Roses for a Blue Lady =

1948 song by Sid Tepper and Roy C. Bennett

Single by Vic Dana

from the album Red Roses for a Blue Lady
- B-side: "Blue Ribbons (For Her Curls)"
- Released: January 1965
- Genre: Easy Listening
- Length: 2:45
- Label: Dolton
- Songwriters: Sid Tepper; Roy C. Bennett
- Producer: Dick Glasser

Vic Dana singles chronology
"Frenchy" (1964)	"Red Roses for a Blue Lady" (1965)	"Bring a Little Sunshine (To My Heart)" (1965)

"Red Roses for a Blue Lady"

Single by Bert Kaempfert
- B-side: "Lonely Nightingale"
- Released: January 1965
- Genre: Easy Listening
- Length: 2:20
- Label: Decca
- Songwriters: Sid Tepper; Roy C. Bennett

Bert Kaempfert singles chronology
"Holiday for Bells" (1963)	"Red Roses for a Blue Lady" (1965)	"Three O'Clock in the Morning" (1965)

"Red Roses for a Blue Lady"

Single by Wayne Newton
- B-side: "One More Memory"
- Released: February 1965
- Genre: Easy Listening
- Length: 2:20
- Label: Capitol
- Songwriters: Sid Tepper; Roy C. Bennett

Wayne Newton singles chronology
"Coming On Too Strong" (1965)	"Red Roses for a Blue Lady" (1965)	"I'll Be With You In Apple Blossom Time" (1965)

"Red Roses for a Blue Lady" is a 1948 popular song by Sid Tepper and Roy C. Bennett (alias Roy Brodsky). It has been recorded by a number of performers. Actor-singer John Laurenz (1909–1958) was the first to record the song for Mercury Records. It rose to #2 on the weekly “Your Hit Parade” radio survey in the spring of 1949. The original 78 rpm single was issued on Mercury 5201 - Red Roses For A Blue Lady (Roy Brodsky-Sid Tepper) by John Laurenz.

It was a hit again for Andy Williams, Wayne Newton and others in 1965.

== Lyrical content ==
The song is about a man who wishes to give flowers as a gift to the woman he loves after the two have had a disagreement and that said disagreement made her blue (i.e., sad). He hopes that if his sweetheart accepts his plea for forgiveness, the two will marry and that he will soon return to pick out the florist’s “best white orchid for her wedding gown."

== Other recorded versions ==
- The best-selling recording was made by Vaughn Monroe and his orchestra, with credited vocalists Vaughn Monroe and The Moon Men, on December 15, 1948. It was released by RCA Victor Records as catalog number 20-3319 (in United States) and by EMI on the His Master's Voice label as catalogue numbers BD 1247, HN 3014, HQ 3071, IM 13425, and GY 478. It first reached the US Billboard magazine chart on January 14, 1949, and lasted 19 weeks on the chart, peaking at #4.
- Another recording was made by Guy Lombardo and his Royal Canadians on December 22, 1948. It was released by Decca Records as catalog number 24549. The record first reached the Billboard chart on February 4, 1949, and lasted 13 weeks on the chart, peaking at #10.
- The song was revived during the winter of 1965 by vocalists Vic Dana and Wayne Newton and instrumentalist Bert Kaempfert, all three versions charting simultaneously: Dana's rendition was the most successful, peaking at #10 on the Billboard Hot 100 chart. Kaempfert's recording peaked at #11 on the same chart, and Newton's reached #23. All three versions were also listed on Billboard′s Easy Listening survey, with Dana and Kaempfert's versions both peaking at #2 and Newton's at #4.
- Andy Williams released a version in 1965 as the B-side to his hit song "...and Roses and Roses".
- Harry James recorded a version in 1965 on his album Harry James Plays Green Onions & Other Great Hits (Dot DLP 3634 and DLP 25634).
- Bruno Balz has written German lyrics. The German title is "Ich sende dir Rosen". The Cornel Trio recorded it in Berlin on October 15, 1952. The song was released by Electrola as catalog number EG 7848.
- The Swedish singer Östen Warnerbring had his breakthrough in 1965 with a Swedish version of the song with lyrics by Ingrid Reuterskiöld, "En röd blomma till en blond flicka". His fellow countryman Carl Holmberg had recorded Reuterskiöld's version already in 1949.

== Charts ==
=== Weekly charts ===
Vaughn Monroe and His Orchestra Vocalists

Chart (1949)	Peak position
US Billboard Hot 100	4

Guy Lombardo and his Royal Canadians

Chart (1949)	Peak position
US Billboard Hot 100	10

Vic Dana

Chart (1965)	Peak position
Australia (Kent Music Report)	8
US Billboard Hot 100	10
US Adult Contemporary (Billboard)	2
US Cash Box Top 100	11

=== Year-end charts ===
Chart (1965)	Rank
US Billboard Hot 100	76

Bert Kaempfert & His Orchestra

Chart (1965)	Peak position
US Billboard Hot 100	11
US Adult Contemporary (Billboard)	3
US Cash Box Top 100	9

Chart (1965)	Rank
US Billboard Hot 100	32
US Cash Box Top 100	41

Wayne Newton

Chart (1965)	Peak position
Canada Adult Contemporary (RPM)	3
US Billboard Hot 100	23
US Adult Contemporary (Billboard)	4
US Cash Box Top 100	18
