= Just We Two =

Studio album by Norrie Paramor and his Orchestra
- Recorded: Abbey Road Studios, London
- Genre: Easy Listening, pop
- Label: Columbia, Capitol Records

Just We Two is the title of a recording by the Norrie Paramor and his Orchestra, released 1956 in Australia on Columbia LP record 330S-1076 and 1959 in the United States on Capitol LP record T10111.

For this album Paramor used a smaller group of musicians than usual, but augmented the sound with a Hammond organ. This "smaller group" still utliized sections of brass, woodwinds, and strings plus a harp and electric guitar. The Age's record reviewer considered the recording to provide an understated, pleasant ambience that overcame poor material with deft arrangements. Barbara Brawley of the Charlotte Observer called the album "frankly sentimental" but compared the album favorably with Paramor's previous releases as "excellent mood music."

== Track listing ==
=== Side one ===
1. "Cocktails for Two" (Arthur Johnston – Sam Coslow)
2. "Two Cigarettes in the Dark" (Lew Pollack – Paul Francis Webster)
3. "Two on a Vespa" (Dany Michel)
4. "Concerto for Two" (Tchaikovsky arr. Haring)
5. "Two Silhouettes" (Walcott)
6. "Two Little Bluebirds" (Kern – Harbach – Hammersein II)

=== Side two ===
1. "Two Dreams Met" (Warren)
2. "Two in a Gondola" (Dave Cavanaugh – Dave Dexter, Jr.)
3. "Tea for Two" (Vincent Youmans – Irving Caesar)
4. "No Two People" (Frank Loesser)
5. "Just We Two" (Sigmund Romberg – Dorothy Donnelly)
6. "Two Sleepy People" (Hoagy Carmichael – Frank Loesser)
