= Cathy Carroll =

American singer

Carolyn Stern (born December 26, 1939), better known by her stage name Cathy Carroll, is an American pop singer. She first recorded for the Triodex label in 1961, with members of the Earls and the 4 Evers singing backing vocals. Her single "Jimmy Love" reached #11 on the WLS Chicago survey and was a Top 10 hit in several cities.

She later recorded "Poor Little Puppet" at Warner Brothers, which became her only Billboard Hot 100 entry, peaking at No. 91. She also recorded a cover of Johnnie Ray's "Cry", and cut further recordings in the early 1960s for the Philips, Cheer, Musicor, and Dot labels. Her recordings included an answer version to Brian Hyland's "Ginny Come Lately", and a version of Cliff Richard's UK number one "The Young Ones".

Carroll was portrayed as the "typical American girl" and went on a sponsored tour of 100 radio stations. In 1967 she married Bob Halley, who wrote and produced the songs for her Dot and Rotate Records releases, as well as inking the orchestrations. She retired from music in the 1970s to raise her two children, a son (Ronald Scott) born in 1968 and a daughter (Jennifer) born in 1976.

In the 2000s, the Cheer label issued a 24-track CD of her complete works.
