= When the Girl in Your Arms Is the Girl in Your Heart =

1961 single by Cliff Richard

Single by Cliff Richard with Norrie Paramor and his Orchestra

from the album The Young Ones
- B-side: "Got a Funny Feeling"
- Released: 6 October 1961
- Recorded: 30 January 1961
- Studio: EMI Studios, London
- Genre: Pop
- Length: 2:25
- Label: Columbia 45-DB 4716
- Songwriters: Tepper; Bennett
- Producer: Norrie Paramor

Cliff Richard with Norrie Paramor and his Orchestra singles chronology
"A Girl Like You" (1961)	"When the Girl in Your Arms Is the Girl in Your Heart" (1961)	"The Young Ones" / "We Say Yeah" (1962)

"When the Boy in Your Arms (Is the Boy in Your Heart)"

Single by Connie Francis

from the album Connie Francis Sings ("Second Hand Love") and Other Hits
- B-side: "Baby's First Christmas"
- Released: 10 November 1961
- Recorded: 2 November 1961
- Studio: New York City
- Genre: Pop
- Length: 2:40
- Label: MGM K 13051
- Songwriters: Tepper; Bennett
- Producer: Arnold Maxin

Connie Francis singles chronology
"Hollywood" / "(He's My) Dreamboat" (1961)	"When the Boy in Your Arms (Is the Boy in Your Heart)" / "Baby's First Christmas" (1961)	"Don't Break the Heart That Loves You" (1962)

"When the Girl in Your Arms Is the Girl in Your Heart" is a 1961 song by Cliff Richard, written by the songwriting team of Sid Tepper and Roy C. Bennett who would contribute fifteen songs to the Cliff Richard canon including his career record "The Young Ones". Produced by Richard's regular producer Norrie Paramor, "When the Girl in Your Arms..." featured backing by the Norrie Paramor Orchestra. Richard's own group the Shadows backed him on the B-side "Got a Funny Feeling".

== History ==
Recorded in January 1961, "When the Girl in Your Arms..." was not released until that October as the first advance single for the Cliff Richard movie vehicle The Young Ones. The track reached a chart peak of #3 in the UK and gave Richard a #1 hit in the Netherlands, Norway (for eight weeks) and South Africa. A #2 hit in Australia and Ireland, Richard's "When the Girl in Your Arms..." was also a hit in Belgium/Flemish Region (#4), Belgium/Wallonia (#10) and New Zealand (#7).

Although Cliff Richard had a deal for US distribution with ABC-Paramount - who in 1959 had released his only US hit (as of 1961) "Living Doll" (#30) - "When the Girl in Your Arms..." was not given a US release concurrent with its UK charting, as ABC-Parmamount felt it prudent to await the American opening of the track's parent movie The Young Ones. Connie Francis heard Richard's hit while visiting the UK and in an unusual move Francis - whose singles were typically remakes of traditional pop standards or original material - covered Richard's UK hit in a 2 November 1961 session in New York City produced by Arnold Maxin with Don Costa as arranger/conductor. Entitled "When the Boy in Your Arms (Is the Boy in Your Heart)", Francis' version reached #10 on the Billboard Hot 100 and also on Canada's CHUM charts in January 1962 and #8 in Cash Box. The single's B-side "Baby's First Christmas" also became a chart hit over the 1961 holiday season reaching #26 and co-charting with the a-side in Canada at #10.

In light of the Cliff Richard original's success in the UK, Francis's version of "When the Boy in Your Arms (is the Boy in Your Heart)" did not have a parallel release in the UK where instead "Baby's First Christmas" - backed by "I'm Falling in Love With You Tonight" - was released as an A-side reaching #30. The lack of a late 1961 mainstream release by Francis had a strong negative impact on her UK career where previously her singles had equaled or exceeded their US impact. Francis' next single release "Don't Break the Heart That Loves You" despite hitting #1 in the US only reached #39 in the UK and Francis would have only four subsequent UK chartings with "Vacation" at #10 her only Top Twenty entrant.

Despite the success of Cliff Richard's "When the Girl in Your Arms..." in Australia and New Zealand, Francis' "When the Boy in Your Arms..." was released in these territories to reach #40 in Australia and become a Top Ten in New Zealand, the latter in March 1962 despite the success of the Cliff Richard original in New Zealand the previous month. "When the Boy in Your Arms..." also gave Francis a #1 hit in Hong Kong.

Cliff Richard was "very unhappy" at losing a potential US Top Ten breakthrough hit to the Connie Francis cover; his displeasure led his home label EMI to reassign the US rights for Richard's releases to Bigtop Records as of February 1962. Richard would remain absent from the US charts until August 1963: over the following twelve-month period he would make four appearances on the Billboard Hot 100 with only one of these releases - Epic was now Richard's US label - becoming a Top 40 hit: "It's All in the Game". Except for a #99 appearance in 1968 with "Congratulations", Richard was subsequently absent from the Hot 100 until 1976 when he had his first (of three) US Top Ten hits with "Devil Woman" (#6).

== Charts ==
Cliff Richard version

Chart (1961–62)	Peak position
Australia (Kent Music Report)	2
Belgium (Ultratop 50 Flanders)	4
Belgium (Ultratop 50 Wallonia)	46
Ireland (Evening Herald)	2
New Zealand (Lever Hit Parade)	5
Norway (VG-lista)	1
South Africa (South African & Lourenço Marques Radio)	1
Sweden (Sverigetopplistan)	18
UK Singles (Official Charts)	3

Connie Francis version

Chart (1961–62)	Peak position
Australia (Kent Music Report)	40
Canada (CHUM)	10
New Zealand (Lever Hit Parade)	6
US Billboard Hot 100	10
US Adult Contemporary (Billboard)	2
US Cash Box Top 100	8

== Other cover versions ==
A version of "When the Girl in Your Arms Is the Girl in Your Heart" became the first chart record for Ricky Shayne, reaching No. 33 on the charts in Germany in February 1967.

The song was also recorded as "When the Girl in Your Arms" by Dominic Kirwan on his 2002 album Golden Dreams and by Michael English on his 2008 album All My Life.

In December 1961, Lale Andersen cut a German cover version of the song entitled "Roter Rubin". A Dutch rendering: "Op die dag in de zon" (on that day in the sun), has been recorded by Willeke Alberti and John Spencer; the Alberti version was on a 1962 single release coupled with Alberti's rendition of the Sue Thompson hit "Norman".

Hank Marvin did an instrumental of the song on his album Hank Plays Cliff.
