= (He's My) Dreamboat =

Single by Connie Francis

from the album Connie Francis Sings "Second Hand Love"
- A-side: "Hollywood"
- Released: September 1961
- Genre: Easy listening
- Length: 2:40
- Label: MGM; 13039
- Songwriter: John D. Loudermilk

Connie Francis singles chronology
"Together" (1961)	"(He's My) Dreamboat" (1961)	"When the Boy in Your Arms (Is the Boy in Your Heart)" (1961)

Audio
- "(He's My) Dreamboat" on YouTube

"(He's My) Dreamboat" is a song written by John D. Loudermilk and performed by Connie Francis. In 1961, the track reached No. 14 on the Billboard Hot 100 and No. 14 in Canada. It was the B-side of her single Hollywood, which it outperformed on the charts.

It was featured on her 1962 album, Connie Francis Sings "Second Hand Love".

The song was met with a positive critical reception upon its release. Billboard magazine said that it's a "relaxed blues-ballad," calling it a "standout performance." Cashbox reviewed the song in mid September and wrote that it's an "inviting romancer that Connie delivers with slow beat-ballad finesse," adding that there's a "Top-notch assist from Cliff Parman's ork-chorus."
