= We Say Yeah =

1962 single by Cliff Richard & the Shadows

- Cover of the German edition

Single by Cliff Richard and the Shadows

from the album The Young Ones
- A-side: "The Young Ones"
- Released: 5 January 1962
- Recorded: 28 July 1961
- Studio: EMI, London
- Length: 2:11
- Label: Columbia
- Songwriters: Bruce Welch; Hank Marvin; Peter Gormley
- Producer: Norrie Paramor

Cliff Richard and the Shadows singles chronology
"When the Girl in Your Arms Is the Girl in Your Heart" (1961)	"The Young Ones" / "We Say Yeah" (1962)	"I'm Looking Out the Window" / "Do You Want to Dance" (1962)

"We Say Yeah" is a song originally performed by Cliff Richard and the Shadows. It was initially released in December 1961 on The Young Ones soundtrack album and a few weeks later the B-side to "The Young Ones" single. Both reached number one in their respective UK charts.

== Johnny Hallyday version ("Dis-moi oui") ==
"Dis-moi Oui"

Single by Johnny Hallyday

from the album Johnny Hallyday (Les Bras en croix)
- Language: French
- English title: Tell me yes
- Released: 10 May 1963
- Genre: Rock and roll
- Length: 2:07
- Label: Philips
- Songwriters: Bruce Welch, Hank Marvin, Peter Gormley, Ralph Bernet, Claude Carrère
- Producer: Lee Hallyday

Johnny Hallyday singles chronology
"Tes tendres années" (1963)	"Les Bras en croix" / "Quitte-moi doucement" / "Quand un air vous possède" / "Quitte-moi doucement" / "Quand un air vous possède" / "Dis-moi oui" (1963)	"Da dou ron ron" (1964)

The song was adapted into French (under the title "Dis-moi oui", meaning "Tell me yes") by Ralph Bernet and Claude Carrère and recorded by French singer Johnny Hallyday. He included it on his 1963 album Johnny Hallyday (commonly referred to as "Les Bras en croix") (commonly known as Les Bras en croix) and also released on the EP "Les Bras en croix".

=== Track listing ===
Les bras en croix, 7-inch EP Philips 432.908 BE (1963, France, Spain, etc.)

A1. "Les bras en croix" (2:13)
A2. "Quitte-moi doucement" ("Break It to Me Gently") (2:30)
B1. "Quand un air vous possède" ("When My Little Girl Is Smiling") (2:17)
B2. "Dis-moi oui" ("We Say Yeah") (2:07)

=== Charts ===
Chart (1963)	Peak position
Belgium (Ultratop 50 Wallonia)	38
