= Phyllida Crowley Smith =

British dancer, actress, and choreographer

Phyllida Smith
- Born: Phyllida Crowley Smith; 9 December 1967 (age 58); Stoke, England, U.K.
- Occupations: Ballerina, actress, choreographer
- Years active: 1984–present
- Spouse: Jimmy Johnston
- Children: 2

Phyllida Crowley Smith (born 9 December 1967) is an English ballerina, theatre actress and choreographer.

Born in Stoke and grew up in the Isle of Wight and studied at the Bush Davies School of Theatre Arts, she won The Cosmopolitan Magazine Award for Best Younger Dancer at the age of 16.

Theatre credits include Heathcliff, Andrew Lloyd Webber's Cats (playing the role of Victoria the White Cat, which she reprised in the 1998 video release), Mary Poppins, Chitty Chitty Bang Bang and The Phantom of the Opera (as Meg Giry).

In 2010, she was the choreographer for the pantomime Peter Pan at the Wyvern Theatre in Swindon. Crowley Smith is currently the Head of Dance at Guildford School of Acting.

== Personal life ==
She has two sons with her husband Jimmy Johnston; Harley born 1998 and Elliot born 2005.
