= Les Bras en croix =

1963 single by Johnny Hallyday

Single by Johnny Hallyday

from the album Johnny Hallyday (Les Bras en croix)
- Language: French
- English title: Arms Crossed
- Released: 10 May 1963
- Genre: Rock and roll
- Length: 2:13
- Label: Philips
- Songwriter(s): Johnny Hallyday (music); Jil & Jan (lyrics)

Johnny Hallyday singles chronology
"Tes tendres années" (1963)	"Les Bras en croix" / "Quitte-moi doucement" / "Quand un air vous possède" / "Quitte-moi doucement" / "Quand un air vous possède" / "Dis-moi oui" (1963)	"Da dou ron ron" (1963)

EP

"Les Bras en croix" ("Arms Crossed") is a song by French singer Johnny Hallyday, released in 1963. It was written by Jil & Jan (lyrics) and Johnny Hallyday (music).

The song was included on Hallyday's 1963 album Johnny Hallyday (commonly known as Les Bras en croix).

== Commercial performance ==
In France the song reached no. 1 on the singles sales chart.

In Wallonia (Belgium) it spent 28 weeks in the chart, peaking at no. 6 for one week.

== Track listing ==
7-inch EP Philips 432.908 BE (1963, France, Spain, etc.)

A1. "Les bras en croix" (2:13)
A2. "Quitte-moi doucement" ("Break It to Me Gently") (2:30)
B1. "Quand un air vous possède" ("When My Little Girl Is Smiling") (2:17)
B2. "Dis-moi oui" ("We Say Yeah") (2:07)

== Charts ==
Chart (1963)	Peak position
Belgium (Ultratop 50 Wallonia)	6
France (singles sales)	1

- Charted in Belgium as "Les Bras en croix / Quand un air vous possède"
