= Joseph J. Sullivan (vaudeville) =

Blackface performer

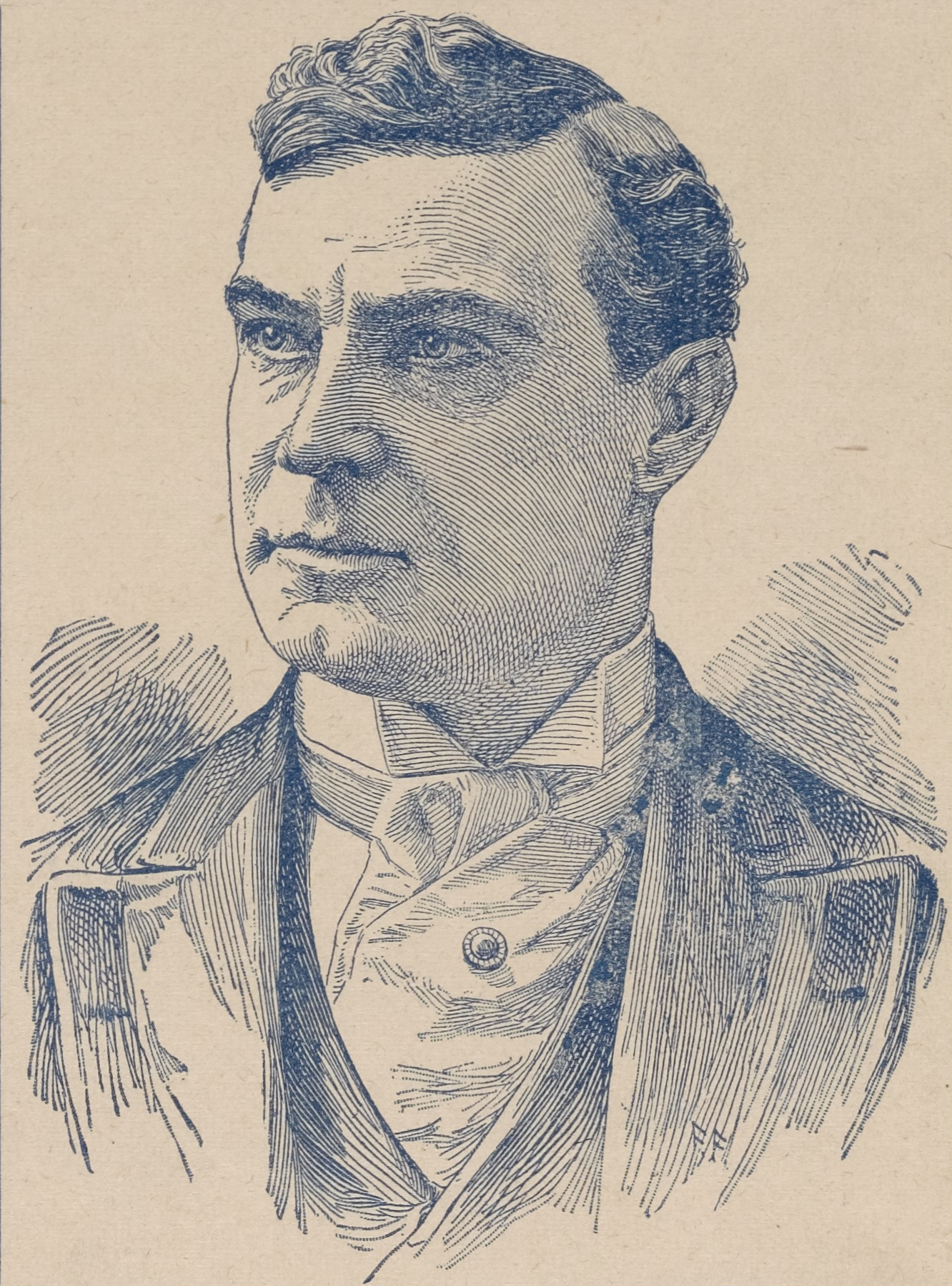
Joe J. Sullivan as depicted on an 1893 songsheet.

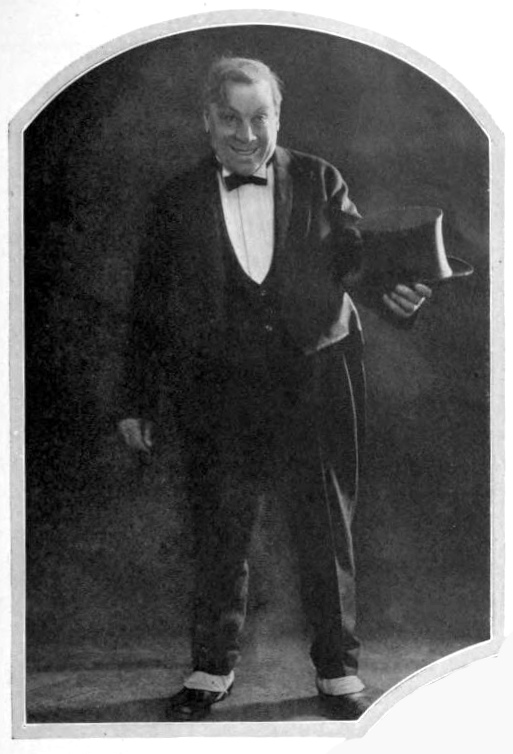
Joe J. Sullivan in 1922.

Joseph J. Sullivan was a blackface comedian and acrobat in New York. He is best known for composing the vaudeville song Where Did You Get That Hat? which he first performed in 1888. It was a great success and he performed it many times thereafter. His other song compositions include Little Paddy Rooney in 1893.

Little else is known about his life, but in July 1922 a monthly New York theatre magazine described how he had recently 'brought back the "flannel-mouthed" Irish comedians when he regaled vaudeville patrons with Where Did You Get That Hat?'.
