= Where Did You Get That Hat? =

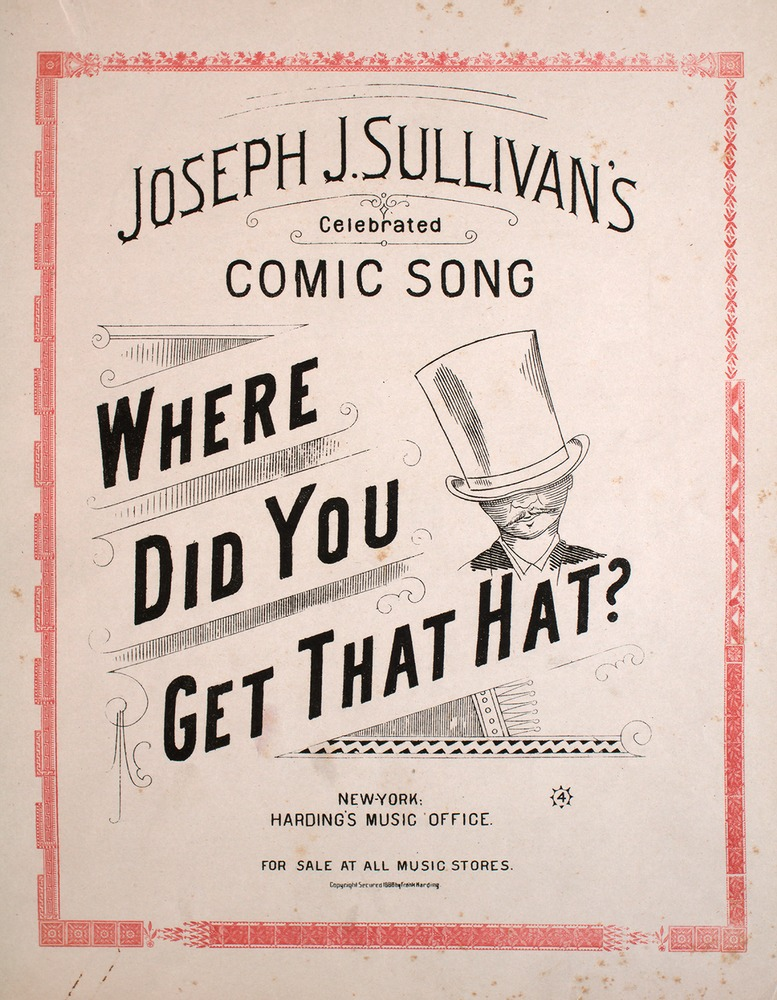

Song by Joseph J. Sullivan
- Released: 1888
- Genre: Comic, vaudeville song
- Songwriter(s): Joseph J. Sullivan, James Rolmaz

"Where Did You Get That Hat?" is a comic song that was composed and first performed by vaudeville artist Joseph J. Sullivan at Miner's Eighth Avenue Theatre in 1888. It was a great success and soon performed by other music hall artists in the 1890s including George Robey and J. C. Heffron.

Sullivan's original song consisted of three verses, each followed by a chorus, and it was soon included in penny broadsides of the period. Then in 1901, James Rolmaz (who had written a sequel in 1891 titled "A New Hat Now") wrote an additional two verses commenting on elections and the Prince of Wales to give the original song a more political twist, which increased its popularity further.

It has since been performed by other artists such as Stanley Holloway, Al Simmons and Dave Barnes, and Bing Crosby included the song in a medley on his album 101 Gang Songs (1961).

The song is now also a very popular piece performed for musical theatre exams (grades 4 to 8) and music hall concerts.
