= I Want You to Know (Fats Domino song) =

Single by Fats Domino

from the album Fats Domino Sings
- B-side: "The Big Beat"
- Released: December 1957
- Recorded: 1957
- Genre: R&B
- Length: 1:59
- Label: Imperial
- Songwriters: Fats Domino and Dave Bartholomew

"I Want You to Know" is a 1957 Fats Domino and Dave Bartholomew song. Since Domino was on the road touring Bartholomew hired Allen Toussaint to lay down the piano track. The other side of the single was "The Big Beat", which although listed second on the cover, also became a hit.

"I Want to Know" was covered by The Everly Brothers in 1960 on their album It's Everly Time. It was also covered by the early reggae artist Millie Small on her 1965 album Millie Small Sings Fats Domino.
