= Ronald Cass =

British writer (1923–2006)

- Born: Ronald Cass; 21 April 1923; Llanelli, Wales
- Died: 2 June 2006 (aged 83)
- Occupations: Screenwriter; composer; playwright; novelist; musical director
- Spouse: Valerie Carton
- Children: Debbie, Stephen and Nicola
- Relatives: Joseph, Rachel, Leila and Benji (grandchildren)
- Writing career
- Period: 1949–1979
- Genre: Musical
- Notable works: Summer Holiday, The Young Ones

Ronald Cass (21 April 1923 – 2 June 2006), also known as Ronnie Cass, was a British screenwriter, composer, playwright, novelist and music director. He co-wrote the screenplays for the Cliff Richard films The Young Ones (1961) and Summer Holiday (1963).

== Biography ==
Cass was born in Llanelli, Wales, to Saul and Rachel Cass, the second of five sons. One of his brothers, Leslie Cass, also worked in the same field as Ronnie, and composed his own play entitled The Story of Ruth, which was performed in Sheffield. His family was Jewish, and he was himself a member of the New London Synagogue.

Cass first pursued a career as a maths teacher but in 1951 was recognized more for his contributions to several musicals produced at Leicester Square's Irving Theatre club. Cass was studying economics at Aberystwyth University when World War II began and he joined the RAF. When he and his squadron were posted in Burma, he insisted that they take a piano with them so that he could continue entertaining the troops.

Cass returned to Wales after the war ended in 1945, but travelled to London in 1949 in search of musical opportunities. It did not take much searching before Cecil Landeau hired him as musical director at Ciro's night-club, and it was there that Cass met Peter Myers, who was preparing a new revue. They soon put together a successful after-the-show show called 10:15 at the Irving Theatre.

In 1952, Cass attended a show performed by the students of the London School of Economics, and was so impressed by one of them, Ron Moody, that he and Myers decided to let him make a début performance in Intimacy at 8, a revue presented at the New Lindsay Theatre. This show was retitled High Spirits when it reopened in the Hippodrome Theatre in 1953. Cass said that High Spirits had always been his favourite show. Among the cast was an actress named Valerie Carton, whom he married in 1955.

Cass went on to write TV plays, cantatas, and cabaret shows for cruise liners. He composed the score to the film adaptation of Never Mind the Quality Feel the Width in 1973, and joined his old friend, Warren Mitchell, to write The Thoughts of Chairman Alf in 1975, which travelled with them and was performed all over the country for the next twenty years. Cass worked with another friend, Tom Jones, on more than 70 television shows and musicals. In the 1990s he acted as Programme Associate on ITV's Highway programmes with Sir Harry Secombe.

Having joined the theatre from the world of cabaret, Cass tried cabaret again in 1979, co-writing Blondes and Bombshells. He wrote two novels, True Blue and Fringe Benefits, and a book of theatrical humour called A Funny Thing Happened or an Anthology of Pro's.

== Personal life ==
Ronald Cass married actress Valerie Carton in 1955, and had three children, Debbie, Stephen and Nicola, and four grandchildren, Joseph, Rachel, Leila and Benji. He died in June 2006, at the age of 83.

== Credits ==
Theatre works

- 10:15 Revue (1951)
- The Irving Revue (1952)
- Just Lately, Intimacy at Eight (1952)
- High Spirits (1953)
- Intimacy at 8:30 (1954)
- For Amusement Only (1956)
- Harmony Close (1957)
- For Adults Only (1958)
- The Lord Chamberlain Regrets (1961)
- Enrico (1963)
- Jack and the Beanstalk (composition contributor) (1968)
- Deja Revue (1975)
- Deja Revue, Move Along Sideways (1975)
- The Thoughts of Chairman Alf (1977)
- Blondes and Bombshells (1979)

Film scores

- The Young Ones (1961)
- Summer Holiday (1963)
- Never Mind the Quality Feel the Width (1973)

Teleplays

- Affair on Demand
- The Other Side of London

Writings

- A Funny Thing Happened, or An Anthology of Pro's
- The Highway Companion
- True Blue
- Fringe Benefits
