= Together (1928 song) =

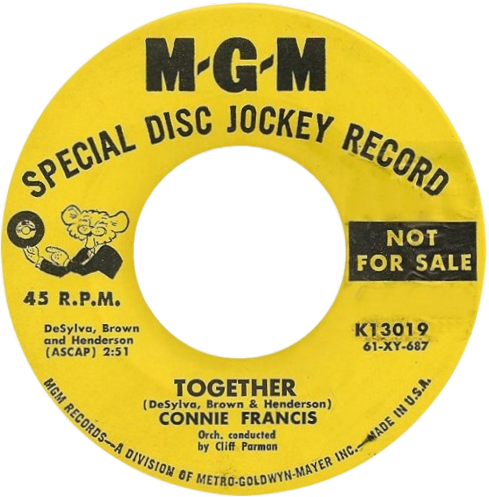

Single by Connie Francis

from the album Connie Francis Sings "Second Hand Love"
- B-side: "Too Many Rules"
- Released: 1961
- Recorded: 3 June 1961
- Genre: Pop
- Length: 2:52
- Label: MGM; USA: K 13019; France: SPF-1090; UK: 45-MGM-1138; Norway: 45-MGM-6565; New Zealand: 45-MGM-73098
- Songwriters: Ray Henderson; Buddy G. DeSylva & Lew Brown

Connie Francis singles chronology
"Breakin' in a Brand New Broken Heart" (1961)	"Together" / "Too Many Rules" (1961)	"(He's My) Dreamboat" (1961)

"Together" is a 1928 popular song with music by Ray Henderson and lyrics by Buddy G. DeSylva and Lew Brown. The most popular 1928 recording of the song, by Paul Whiteman, with Bix Beiderbecke on cornet, was a #1 hit for two weeks.

== Early revivals ==
The song was included in a 1944 movie, Since You Went Away. This gave rise to a revival of the song, and it was recorded by Dick Haymes and Helen Forrest in a duet. Their recording was released by Decca Records as catalog number 23349. It first reached the Billboard magazine Best Seller chart on October 5, 1944, and lasted 10 weeks on the chart, peaking at #3. This recording was paired on a single with "It Had to Be You," a #4 hit, producing a big two-sided hit.

== Connie Francis version ==
"Together" became a Top Ten hit in the summer of 1961 via a recording by Connie Francis cut in New York City on 3 June 1961 with Cliff Parman acting as arranger and conductor. After focusing on new material for her recent singles releases, Francis with "Together" reverted to the mode of remaking traditional pop songs which had provided her with her biggest hits in the 1950s. "Together" reached #6 on the Billboard Hot 100 and was the first single release by Francis which could avail itself of the July 1961 inauguration of Billboard's Easy Listening chart where "Together" peaked at #1. Internationally, Francis' "Together" sold and charted well, reaching #2 in Australia, #6 in the UK, #7 in Ireland, #6 in New Zealand, #1 in India, and #13 in Canada.

== Later versions ==
"Together" was the title cut for a 1964 collaborative album by Marvin Gaye and Mary Wells which - apart from the original songs "Once Upon a Time" and "What's the Matter with You Baby" released as a single- consisted of remakes of traditional pop songs. "Together" was also the title cut of a 1976 Anne Murray album.

The Nick Lucas recording of "Together" plays in the background on the John Lennon and Yoko Ono album Two Virgins, released in 1968 on Apple Records.

== Recorded versions ==
- Louis Armstrong
- Mildred Bailey
- Count Basie
- Sathima Bea Benjamin
- Beverley Sisters
- Teresa Brewer
- Dave Brubeck
- Ray Charles
- Rosemary Clooney
- Dorothy Collins
- Bing Crosby included the song in a medley on his album On the Sentimental Side (1962).
- Cass Daley
- Eddie "Lockjaw" Davis
- Jimmy Dorsey
- Billy Eckstine
- Cliff "Ukulele Ike" Edwards
- Les Elgart
- Connie Francis
- Marvin Gaye & Mary Wells
- Benny Goodman
- Ken Griffin
- Dick Haymes and Helen Forrest
- Eddy Howard
- Keith Ingham
- Arnold Johnson and his orchestra
- Stan Kenton
- Wayne King
- Andy Kirk
- Guy Lombardo
- Gordon MacRae
- Mantovani
- Anne Murray
- Red Nichols
- Brian Ogilvie
- The Old Mill Dance Kings
- Billy Preston
- P.J. Proby
- The Ravens
- Edmundo Ros
- Artie Shaw
- Dinah Shore
- Frank Sinatra
- Soulful Strings
- Rex Stewart
- Frank Weir
- Paul Weston and his orchestra
- Paul Whiteman Orchestra featuring Bix Beiderbecke
- Joe Williams

== See also ==
- List of number-one adult contemporary singles of 1961 (U.S.)
