= Anema e core (1950 song) =

Song written and composed by Salve D'Esposito and Tito Manlio

Single by Salve D'Esposito
- Written: 1950
- Genre: Canzone napoletana
- Songwriter: Tito Manlio

"Anema e core" (pronounced [ˈɑːnəm(ə) e kˈkɔːrə]; Neapolitan for "Soul and Heart") is a popular Neapolitan song composed by Salve D'Esposito with lyrics by Tito Manlio. It was first introduced in 1950, sung by the tenor Tito Schipa.

== English versions ==
Three sets of English lyrics have been written to this song:

=== "Until" ===
The first English lyrics were written under the title "Until" by Sylvia Dee and Sidney Lippman. The best-known recording of this song in 1952 was recorded by Dinah Shore. It was also recorded by Dean Martin on November 19, 1951.

- A recording of the song was made on December 16, 1951, by Johnny Desmond. It was released as Coral Records catalog number 60629.
- There were also instrumental recordings by the Frankie Carle and Freddy Martin orchestras (though, as instrumentals, there is nothing to differentiate them from the other versions named below).

=== "Anema e core" / "With All My Heart and Soul" ===
Another English lyric was written by Manny Curtis and Harry Akst. This version was sometimes recorded under the Italian title and sometimes under the English title "With All My Heart and Soul".

- In 1953, it was included in the Broadway musical, John Murray Anderson's Almanac, with the new Curtis/Akst lyrics.
- The biggest hit version was recorded by Eddie Fisher with Hugo Winterhalter's orchestra and chorus at Manhattan Center, New York City, on February 11, 1954. It was released by RCA Victor Records as catalog number 20-5675 (78 rpm record) and 47-5675 (single) (in US). It was also released on His Master's Voice EA 4167 and His Master's Voice (S) X 7981. The US release first reached the Billboard (magazine) Best Seller chart on March 31, 1954, and lasted 14 weeks on the chart, peaking at number 14. The song also made the Cash Box Best-Selling Records chart that year, peaking at number 12.
- Vic Damone included the song on his album Angela Mia (1958).
- Jerry Vale recorded the song for his album Arrivederci, Roma (1963).
- Jimmy Roselli recorded the song in 1964, it charted #125 on Cashbox, later it was included in his album "The Best of Neopolitian Songs"
- A song of the same title was recorded by Perry Como in 1951 but credited to Larry Stock. In 1966, Como recorded "Anema e core" for an album, Perry Como In Italy. The song was also recorded by Michael Bublé more recently.
- One recording, by Connie Francis, includes mostly the Italian lyric but some portions of the Curtis/Akst lyrics. The recording was included in her 1959 album Connie Francis Sings Italian Favorites. Another Italian language performance by Ezio Pinza was briefly included in the landlady scene from The Blues Brothers.

=== "How Wonderful to Know" ===
Yet another set of English lyrics, under the title "How Wonderful to Know," was written by Kermit Goell, and recorded by Joan Regan, by Cliff Richard on his 1960 album 21 Today, by Caterina Valente, and by Andy Williams. Sergio Franchi covered this song in his second RCA Victor Red Seal album Our Man From Italy in 1963. This album placed number 66 on the Billboard 200 album chart.

== Other versions ==
- "Srcem i dusom", a version of this song in Serbo-Croat language, was recorded in 1963 by Croatian jazz and schlager singer, Stjepan Djimi Stanic, on PGP RTB Label, EP 50 220, in Belgrade, Yugoslavia.
