= The Young Ones (1961 film) =

1961 British film by Sidney J. Furie

- Original UK quad format poster
- Directed by: Sidney J. Furie
- Written by: Peter Myers; Ronald Cass
- Produced by: Kenneth Harper; Andrew Mitchell
- Starring: Cliff Richard; Robert Morley; Carole Gray; The Shadows
- Cinematography: Douglas Slocombe
- Edited by: Jack Slade
- Music by: Stanley Black; Ronald Cass
- Production company: Associated British Picture Corporation
- Distributed by: Warner-Pathé Distributors
- Release dates: 13 December 1961 (London); 12 January 1962 (United Kingdom)
- Running time: 108 minutes
- Country: United Kingdom
- Language: English
- Budget: £230,000
- Box office: £750,000 (UK)

The Young Ones (US title: Wonderful to Be Young!) is a 1961 British comedy musical film directed by Sidney J. Furie and starring Cliff Richard, Robert Morley as his character's father, Carole Gray as his love interest, and the Shadows as his band. The screenplay was written by Peter Myers and Ronald Cass, who also wrote most of the songs. Herbert Ross choreographed the dance scenes. Its soundtrack spawned numerous hits, including the title track.

Although Richard had appeared in two pictures prior, The Young Ones was his first major film in a string of musical films including Summer Holiday and Wonderful Life.

The film was produced by the Associated British Picture Corporation and shot at their Elstree Studios. It had its World Premiere on 13 December 1961 at the Warner Theatre in London's West End.

== Plot ==
The story is about a youth club member, and aspiring singer, Nicky and his friends, who try to save their youth club in London's West End from an unscrupulous millionaire property developer Hamilton Black, who plans to tear it down to make room for a large office block.

The members decide to put on a variety show to raise the money needed to buy a lease renewal. The twist in the story is that Nicky is Hamilton Black's son, something he keeps secret from his friends until some of them try to kidnap Black, to prevent him from stopping the show. Although he is fighting his father over the future of the youth club, Nicky cannot allow them to harm him, so he attacks the attackers and frees his father.

Meanwhile, Hamilton Black has realised that his son is the mystery singer that all of London is talking about, after the youth club members have done some pirate broadcasts to promote their show. So, although he has just bought the theatre where the show is to take place, in order to be able to stop it, the proud father decides that the show must go on. At the end, he joins the youth club members on stage, dancing and singing, after having promised to build them a new youth club.

== Cast ==
- Cliff Richard as Nicky
- Robert Morley as Hamilton Black
- Carole Gray as Toni
- The Shadows as the musicians
- Teddy Green as Chris
- Richard O'Sullivan as Ernest
- Melvyn Hayes as Jimmy
- Annette Robertson as Barbara
- Robertson Hare as chauffeur
- Sonya Cordeau as Dorinda Morell
- Sean Sullivan as Eddie
- Harold Scott as Dench
- Gerald Harper as Watts
- Rita Webb as woman in market

== Production ==
This was Cliff Richard's third film, following Serious Charge and Expresso Bongo. Producer Kenneth Harper hired Sidney J. Furie as director and Ronald Cass and Peter Myers as writers, and during a meeting in Harper's flat, the four agreed to borrow the storyline of the film musical Babes In Arms (1939), where youngsters Mickey Rooney and Judy Garland put on a show with their friends to raise money.

The film was originally intended to feature the Shadows in acting roles, but it was decided that more professional young actors needed to be cast instead, so the roles originally intended for Hank Marvin and Jet Harris were given to Richard O'Sullivan and Melvyn Hayes, while the Shadows themselves appear only as non-speaking band members.

A number of actresses were considered to be Cliff Richard's co-star. An early suggestion from the film's choreographer Herbert Ross was New York performer Barbra Streisand. Harper flew to New York and saw her in a show, but did not think that she was suitable. Another early consideration was German singer and actress Heidi Bruhl, while Richard himself in an interview expressed an interest in engaging the very young Helen Shapiro for the role.

In May 1961 it was announced that a 21-year-old actress from Ilford in Essex, Annette Robinson (aka Robertson), would be the female co-star, but within weeks the part was given to Carole Gray, a dancer known for her roles in West End theatre musicals, while Robinson was given the smaller role of Barbara. When Carole Gray sings in the film, it is actually the voice of Grazina Frame, who also provided the singing voice for Lauri Peters in Cliff Richard's next film Summer Holiday (1963).

The standing set constructed for this film remained in situ for well over a decade, featuring in many television productions filmed at Elstree throughout the 60s and early 70s including The Avengers, The Saint, The Baron, UFO and The Protectors.

== Vaudeville routine ==
Scenes set both outside and inside the fictional Countess Theatre (bought by Nicky's father Hamilton Black in the film) were filmed on location at the Finsbury Park Empire Theatre. In the film, a medley of songs known as the "Vaudeville routine," framed by the song "What D'You Know, We've Got A Show", is performed by Nicky and his friends. The entire sequence was recorded in one day (9 August 1961) at the Abbey Road studios, London. While session singers – the Mike Sammes Singers – were used on the album, the film version deployed the actors.

As Victor Rust describes it: "having broken into the dilapidated Finsbury Park Theatre, the members of the youth club, initially despondent, pick up the props, wardrobe, scenery and lighting, and enter into an extensive song and dance routine that features slapstick routines, jokes, songs and dancing". It is this mixture of performance techniques that characterises vaudeville.

The eclectic references in the sequence includes "vaudeville, melodrama, the country house mystery and Astaire and Rogers". At the end, Nicky, to a rapturous reception from screaming female fans, "high-kicking his way centre-stage", sings the chorus of "Living Doll". Thus the quotations from "the performers of yesteryear" merge with "self-quotation" by Cliff. This weaving of the present into the nostalgia creates a sense of continuity and forges a "common bond". Napper reads the reprise of the Edwardian-inspired number at the end, complete with a reconciled Hamilton Black onstage, as "the point at which the generational conflict of the film is resolved, significantly through a continuity of entertainment values and styles".

== Release ==
=== American version ===
In July 1962, Paramount Pictures acquired U.S. and Canadian distribution rights to the film, which was retitled Wonderful to Be Young. The film was edited down to 92 minutes. A new title song was written by Burt Bacharach and Hal David. In mid-October, the film was previewed in New York City. On 21 October, Richard appeared on The Ed Sullivan Show, where he performed "What D'You Know, We've Got a Show". The film premiered in Cincinnati three days later, and went into general release in December.

=== Critical ===
The Monthly Film Bulletin wrote: "Rare and robust shot at a British musical. The story is unremarkable, the numbers very uneven, from a brilliant fantasy opening called "Nothing's Impossible" and the optimism of "What D'You Know We've Got a Show", both written by Peter Myers and Ronald Cass, to one or two blatant imitations of Hollywood routines. But there is a tremendous impression of overall pace and drive, a minimum of linking dialogue, and a richly spirited performance by Robert Morley as the scoundrelly millionaire which serves to weld the whole thing together. The direction, by Sidney J. Furie, is undisciplined yet at least has ideas – several of which appear to be Furie's own."

=== Box office ===
The film was the second most popular movie at the British box office in 1961, following The Guns of Navarone, grossing over £750,000. According to Films and Filming it was the third most popular for Britain for the year ended 31 October 1962 after The Guns of Navarone and Dr No.

In America, the film was not a commercial success.

== Legacy ==
The title of the film was also used for the British television series The Young Ones (1982–1984), which contained many references to Cliff Richard throughout its twelve-episode run.

== Stage adaptation ==
The film has been adapted into a stage musical by John Plews, which premiered at Upstairs at the Gatehouse in London in December 2007. The stage adaptation follows the film story closely, but includes several additional songs. In February 2013 it premiered in Scotland at Eastwood Park Theatre in Giffnock, performed by the EROS Musical Society.
