= Roy C. Bennett =

American songwriter (1918–2015)

- Born: Israel Brodsky; August 12, 1918; Brooklyn, New York, U.S.
- Died: July 2, 2015 (aged 96) Queens, New York, U.S.
- Occupation: Songwriter
- Years active: 1948–2015
- Formerly of: Sid Tepper

Roy C. Bennett (August 12, 1918 – July 2, 2015) was an American songwriter known for the songs he wrote with Sid Tepper, which spawned several hits for Elvis Presley. Between 1945 and 1970, Tepper and Bennett published over 300 songs.

== Biography ==
Born as Israel Brodsky into an Eastern European immigrant family in Brooklyn, New York, as a young boy he befriended a newly arrived neighbor, Sid Tepper. Their mutual interest in music led to a successful music collaboration that spanned more than twenty-five years.

Bennett graduated from Thomas Jefferson High School in the East New York neighborhood in Brooklyn, then he studied music at City College of New York. Although blessed with a good singing voice, he chose to pursue his lifelong interest in writing words and music. His career plans were interrupted by World War II, however, when he served with the United States Army Air Forces. After the war he joined ASCAP and worked as a staff writer for Mills Music Inc. (now EMI Mills Music Inc.)

Partnered with Tepper, between 1945 and 1970 Bennett had close to three hundred musical compositions published. In 1948, they wrote "Red Roses for a Blue Lady". Actor-singer John Laurenz (1909–1958) first recorded the song for Mercury Records in 1948. The original 78 rpm single was issued on Mercury 5201, with Bennett credited on the record label as 'Brodsky'.

On December 22, 1948, Guy Lombardo and His Royal Canadians recorded the song for Decca Records (#24549 A). Vocalist Vaughn Monroe had the best selling version of the song in 1949 for RCA Records. His version was a No. 3 hit single. The song has been recorded by others such as Wayne Newton, Vic Dana, Eddy Arnold, Johnny Tillotson and Andy Williams. Bennett and Tepper scored big again in 1951 when Rosemary Clooney recorded their composition "Suzy Snowflake".

In 1955, their 1954 composition of "Naughty Lady of Shady Lane" was a top-10 hit for both Dean Martin and the Ames Brothers and the novelty song "Nuttin' for Christmas" by the Art Mooney band and singer Barry Gordon went to No. 6 on the music charts and was recorded by four other singers. In 1958, the popular singer and TV variety show host, Perry Como, had a top-10 hit with their "Kewpie Doll".

Other successful artists who recorded Bennett & Tepper songs include the Beatles "Glad All Over" which appears on The Beatles At The BBC), Connie Francis, Tennessee Ernie Ford, Robert Goulet, Dinah Shore, Burl Ives, Eartha Kitt, Les Paul & Mary Ford, Frank Sinatra, Duke Ellington, Tennessee Ernie Ford, Marty Robbins, Jo Stafford, Wayne Newton, and Sarah Vaughan. While these songs were important in the music world, they prospered significantly with the onset of rock and roll music. They wrote fifteen songs for British singer Cliff Richard, including his biggest selling single ever, "The Young Ones", which was also used in Richard's 1961 motion picture of the same name; and two decades later in the 1982–84 UK television series with the same title, The Young Ones. In 2002, Bennett was invited to England to meet Cliff Richard and sang "The Young Ones" with him, before an audience of 12,000 people in Birmingham.

Most significant in his career are the forty-two songs (at least) recorded by Elvis Presley. These songs, co-written with Tepper, appear on a number of Presley's music albums and film soundtracks.

Their collaboration ended in the 1970s when Tepper suffered a heart attack and retired to Florida. Bennett remained active, and published the Choral Singer's Handbook which is still in print today. Fascinated by the desktop computer, he created a software program called PowerMacros for WordPerfect.

In 2002, Bennett and Tepper were honored at ceremonies in Memphis, Tennessee by Lisa Marie Presley for their contribution to her father's success. They were also honored for having written over a third of the tracks on the album, Blue Hawaii. Tepper died in April 2015, while Bennett died on July 2 of the same year in Queens, New York, at the age of 96.
