= Sid Tepper =

American songwriter (1918–2015)

- Born: June 25, 1918; New York City, New York, U.S.
- Died: April 24, 2015 (aged 96); Miami Beach, Florida, U.S.
- Occupation: Songwriter
- Years active: 1948–1970s

Sid Tepper (June 25, 1918 – April 24, 2015) was an American songwriter. He is best known for his collaborations with Roy C. Bennett, which spawned several hits for Elvis Presley. Between 1945 and 1970, Tepper and Bennett published over 300 songs.

== Biography ==
As a youth, Tepper's family moved to Brooklyn, where Tepper met his future musical collaborator, Roy C. Bennett. Their first hit was "Red Roses for a Blue Lady" (1948), recorded by Guy Lombardo and his Royal Canadians. Over the next 22 years, the songwriting team wrote for Tony Bennett, Rosemary Clooney, Peggy Lee, Frank Sinatra, Sarah Vaughan, Dean Martin, and many more.

Tepper and Bennett adjusted well to the advent of rock 'n roll. In 1961 their song "The Young Ones" was instrumental in boosting the career of Cliff Richard, for whom they wrote 21 compositions. They went on to write 43 songs for Elvis Presley, the most of any songwriter, or song writing team (all related to his movies).

In the 1970s Tepper suffered a heart attack, which necessitated the end of his songwriting partnership with Bennett. Tepper retired in Surfside, Florida. In 2002 he and Bennett were honored in Memphis for their part in Elvis Presley's career. Tepper lived in Surfside until 2004, when he moved to Williams Island in Aventura just north of the Miami area. He was honored by the Town of Surfside for his works in 2008 as Sid Tepper Day. Miami-Dade County, via a request from Surfside approved to codesignate 89th Street in town as "Sid Tepper Street" on September 7, 2016.

Tepper died on April 24, 2015, in Miami Beach, Florida, aged 96.

More about the songwriting partnership of Tepper and Bennett, including YouTube play links to many of their songs, is at this commemorative web site created in 2020.
