= Norrie Paramor =

English record producer (1914–1979)

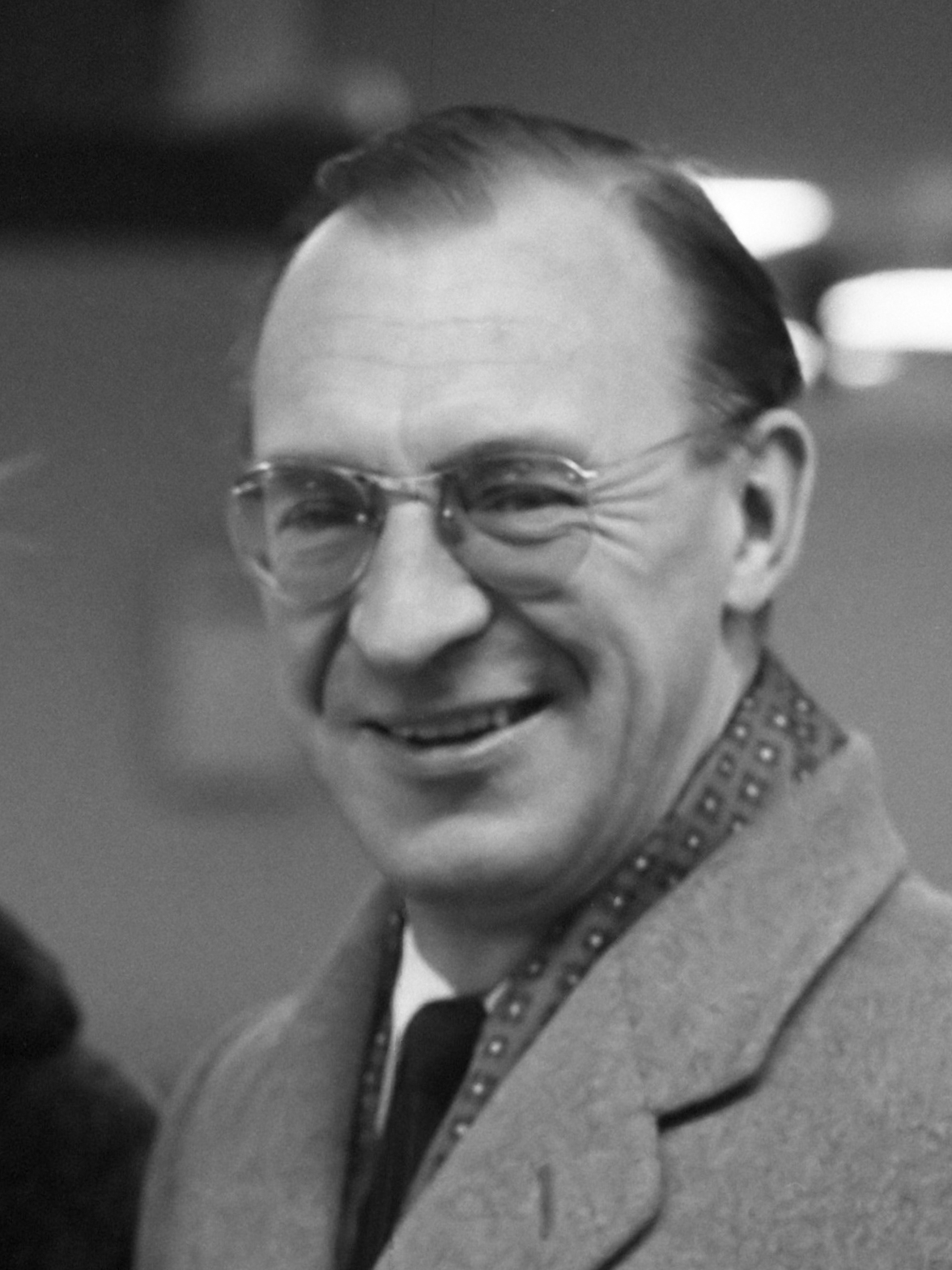
- Paramor in 1960

Background information
- Also known as: Norman Sidney, B-side Norrie
- Born: Norman William Paramor; 15 May 1914; London, England
- Died: 9 September 1979 (aged 65) London, England
- Genres: Light orchestral; pop; rock; swing; easy listening
- Occupations: Record producer, composer, arranger, conductor, pianist, band leader
- Instrument: Piano
- Years active: 1940s–1979
- Label: EMI Music publishing (imprint Capitol Records)
- Formerly of: Norrie Paramor and his Orchestra, The Big Ben Banjo Band

Norman William "Norrie" Paramor (15 May 1914 – 9 September 1979) was a British record producer, composer, arranger, pianist, bandleader, and orchestral conductor. He is best known for his work with Cliff Richard and the Shadows, both together and separately, steering their early careers and producing and arranging most of their material from the late 1950s to the early 1970s. Paramor was an orchestral conductor and composer of music for studio albums, theatrical productions, and film scores.

== Early career ==
Paramor was born in London on 15 May 1914. He left school at the age of fifteen and began working in an office. However, he found his first musical work as pianist accompanist to Gracie Fields, and from there became involved with London dance bands, among them Maurice Winnick's orchestra. During the war Paramor served with the Royal Air Force and worked with Sidney Torch and Max Wall, and became musical director for the Ralph Reader Gang shows, touring the world entertaining troops.

Paramor worked with Harry Gold and his Pieces of Eight and toured with Bing Crosby. Paramor also produced arrangements for Noël Coward, Mantovani and Jack Buchanan during this period.

== Recordings ==
Paramor made his first recordings in 1950 under his own name and with the Big Ben Banjo Band.

== Producer ==
The term "music producer"/record producer" was not in circulation at the time Paramor started producing records. The usual term was Artiste and Repertoire Manager, or A&R man. He effectively began this role in 1952 when he became Recording Director for EMI's Columbia Records. As well as being producer for Cliff Richard and the Shadows, he produced records for Ruby Murray, Eddie Calvert, Michael Holliday, Helen Shapiro, Frank Ifield, Frankie Vaughan, the Mudlarks, the Avons, and Ricky Valance, among others. Per The Guinness Book of British Hit Singles, Paramor and George Martin – his opposite number at EMI sister label Parlophone – jointly held the record for having produced the most UK Number 1 hit singles until Martin produced "Candle in the Wind 97" for Sir Elton John, 18 years after Paramor died. This ignores The Beatles' second single "Please Please Me", produced by Martin, which was recognized as a number one hit by every other publicly available chart of the time, but not by Record Retailer and therefore not by British Hit Singles, which uses that chart as its source from 1960.

In the late 1960s, he left EMI to form his own production company. Kenneth Womack has written about the sometimes intense rivalry between Paramor and George Martin.

== Composer and conductor ==
In 1955, he formed Norman Paramor & His Orchestra and in 1956 they recorded one of the biggest-selling albums from the Capitol of the World import series, released by another subsidiary of EMI, Capitol Records: In London in Love, featuring the soprano Patricia Clarke, who was used in many subsequent selling albums. This became his trademark orchestral signature sound, and was featured on a series of albums, including Autumn, Amor Amor, Emotions (1958) In London, In Love, In Love Again, Moods, My Fair Lady, Warm and Willing and The Zodiac Suite (1959) among others. Albums often featured his original compositions and those of Bobby Black.

Paramor also composed music for films, including Serious Charge (1959), Expresso Bongo (1959), The Young Ones (1961), No My Darling Daughter (1961), The Frightened City (1961), A Pair of Briefs (1962), Two and Two Make Six (1962), The Wild and the Willing (1962), The Fast Lady (1963), Doctor in Distress (1963), Father Came Too! (1963), and My Lover, My Son (1970). He co-wrote the 1962 hit song "Let's Talk About Love" for Helen Shapiro.

In 1962, Paramor was the subject of "A Tribute to Norrie Paramor" by David Frost on the satirical British television programme That Was the Week That Was for, the sketch claimed, taking undeserved songwriting credits and royalties, "writing ordinary tunes with ordinary words" and "[making] everything ordinary."

In 1968, he was the musical director for the Eurovision Song Contest, staged at the Royal Albert Hall, the first to be broadcast in colour. He also conducted the UK entry that year, "Congratulations", performed by Cliff Richard.

In 1970, he became the resident conductor for BBC Midland Radio Orchestra, a post he held until his death. In 1977, Paramor and his orchestra recorded with the Shadows for a final time, on the track "Return to the Alamo".

== Death ==
Paramor died in London, England on 9 September 1979, at the age of 65, a fortnight after Cliff Richard had returned to the top of the UK Singles Chart with "We Don't Talk Anymore", his first number one single in more than ten years. Paramor and Richard had worked together professionally from 1958 to 1972. Cliff Richard would go on to dedicate his 1983 album Silver to Paramor.

== See also ==
- Just We Two, recording by Norrie Paramor and his Orchestra

Preceded by (Austria) Johannes Fehring	Eurovision Song Contest conductor 1968	Succeeded by (Spain) Augusto Algueró
