= The Platinum Collection (Cliff Richard album) =

Compilation album by Cliff Richard
- Released: 14 November 2005
- Recorded: 1958–2004
- Genre: Rock 'n' Roll, pop, easy listening
- Length: 3:45:08
- Label: EMI Records, Parlophone Records

Cliff Richard chronology
Something's Goin' On (2004)	The Platinum Collection (2005)	Two's Company - The Duets (2006)

The Platinum Collection is a compilation album by Cliff Richard, released on 14 November 2005. The album peaked at number 51 on the UK Albums Chart. The album is a triple album set featuring 59 tracks.

== Track listing ==
Includes month of UK release and peak chart position in the UK Singles Chart.

CD one

1. "Move It" (August 1958, No. 2)
2. "High Class Baby" (November 1958, No. 7)
3. "Mean Streak" (April 1959, No. 10)
4. "Living Doll" (July 1959, No. 1)
5. "Travellin' Light" (October 1959, "No. 1)
6. "A Voice in the Wilderness" (January 1960, No. 2)
7. "Fall in Love with You" (March 1960, No. 2)
8. "Please Don't Tease" (June 1960, No. 1)
9. "Nine Times Out of Ten" (September 1960, No. 3)
10. "I Love You" (December 1960, No. 1)
11. "Theme for a Dream" (February 1961, No. 3)
12. "Gee Whizz It's You" (March 1961, No. 4)
13. "A Girl Like You" (March 1961, No. 3)
14. "When the Girl in Your Arms Is the Girl in Your Heart" (October 1961, No. 3)
15. "The Young Ones" (January 1962, No. 1)
16. "Do You Wanna Dance" (May 1962, No. 10)
17. "I'm Looking Out the Window" (May 1962, No. 2)
18. "It'll Be Me" (August 1962, No. 2)
19. "The Next Time" (November 1962, No. 1)
20. "Bachelor Boy" (November 1962, No. 1)
21. "Summer Holiday" (February 1963, No. 1)
22. "Lucky Lips" (May 1963, No. 4)
23. "It's All in the Game" (August 1963, No. 2)
24. "Don't Talk to Him" (November 1963, No. 2)
25. "I'm the Lonely One"(January 1964, No. 8)
26. "Constantly" (April 1964, No. 4)
27. "On the Beach" (June 1964, No. 7)
28. "The Twelfth of Never" (October 1964, No. 8)
29. "I Could Easily Fall (In Love with You)" (November 1964, No. 6)
30. "The Minute You're Gone" (March 1965, No. 1)
31. "On My Word" (June 1965, No. 12)

CD two

1. "Wind Me Up (Let Me Go)" (October 1965, No. 2)
2. "Blue Turns to Grey" (March 1966, No. 15)
3. "Visions" (July 1966, No. 7)
4. "Time Drags By" (October 1966, No. 10)
5. "In the Country" (December 1966, No. 6)
6. "It's All Over" (March 1967, No. 9)
7. "The Day I Met Marie" (August 1967, No. 10)
8. "All My Love" (October 1967, No. 6)
9. "Congratulations" (March 1968, No. 1)
10. "Good Times (Better Times)" (February 1969, No. 12)
11. "Big Ship" (May 1969, No. 8)
12. "Goodbye Same, Hello Samantha" (June 1970, No. 6)
13. "Sing a Song of Freedom" (November 1971, No. 13)
14. "Power to All Our Friends" (March 1973, No. 4)
15. "(You Keep Me) Hangin' On" (May 1974, No. 13)
16. "Miss You Nights" (January 1976, No. 15)
17. "Devil Woman" (April 1976, No. 9)
18. "My Kinda Life" (February 1977, No. 15)
19. "We Don't Talk Anymore" (July 1979, No. 1)
20. "Carrie" (January 1980, No. 4)
21. "Dreaming" (August 1980, No. 8)
22. "A Little in Love" (January 1981, No. 15)
23. "Wired for Sound" (August 1981, No. 4)
24. "Daddy's Home" (live) (November 1981, No. 2)

CD three

1. "The Only Way Out" (July 1982, No. 10)
2. "True Love Ways" (Live) (April 1983, No. 8)
3. "Please Don't Fall in Love" (November 1983, No. 7)
4. "My Pretty One" (June 1987, No. 6)
5. "Some People" (August 1987, No. 3)
6. "The Best of Me" (May 1989, No. 2)
7. "I Just Don't Have the Heart" (August 1989, No. 3)
8. "Stronger Than That" (February 1990, No. 14)
9. "Silhouettes" (live) (August 1990, No. 10)
10. "From a Distance" (October 1990, No. 11)
11. "I Still Believe in You" (November 1992, No. 7)
12. "Peace in Our Time" (March 1993, No. 8)
13. "Can't Keep This Feeling In" (October 1998, No. 10)
14. "The Millennium Prayer" (November 1999, No. 1)
15. "Somewhere Over the Rainbow"/"What a Wonderful World" (December 2001, No. 11)
16. "Something is Going On" (October 2004, No. 9)
17. "I Cannot Give You My Love" (December 2004, No. 13)
18. "What Car" (May 2005, No. 12)

== Charts and certifications ==
=== Weekly charts ===
Chart (2005)	Peak position
UK Albums (OCC)	51

=== Year-end charts ===
Chart (2005)	Position
UK Albums (OCC)	199

=== Certifications ===
Region	Certification	Certified units/sales
United Kingdom (BPI)	Gold	100,000^{^}
^{^} Shipments figures based on certification alone.
