= The Best of Cliff =

Compilation album by Cliff Richard
- Released: 1969
- Label: Columbia

Professional ratings
Review scores
Source	Rating
AllMusic	2/5 stars

The Best of Cliff is a compilation album by Cliff Richard released in 1969 on Columbia Records.

== Track listing ==
Side 1
No.	Title	Length
1.	"The Minute You're Gone"
2.	"On My Word"
3.	"The Time in Between"
4.	"Wind Me Up (Let Me Go)"
5.	"Blue Turns to Grey"
6.	"Visions"
7.	"Time Drags By"

Side 2
No.	Title	Length
1.	"In the Country"
2.	"It's All Over"
3.	"I'll Come Running"
4.	"The Day I Met Marie"
5.	"All My Love"
6.	"Congratulations"
7.	"Girl, You'll Be a Woman Soon"

== Charts ==
Chart (1969)	Peak position
UK Albums (OCC)	5
