= Finders Keepers =

Finders Keepers may refer to:

- Finders, keepers, an adage that asserts that someone who has found an object can keep it

== Literature ==
=== Fiction ===
- Finders Keepers, a 1940 novel by Geoffrey Homes
- Finders Keepers (Will and Nicholas children's book), a 1951 children's book by William Lipkind
- Finders Keepers, a 1971 book by Alix Kates Shulman
- Finders Keepers, a 1982 novel by Dixie Browning
- Finders Keepers, a 1985 novel by Nancy Holder
- Finders Keepers (Rodda novel), a 1990 children's novel by Emily Rodda, basis for the television show The Finder (see below)
- Finders Keepers, a 1998 novel by Fern Michaels
- Finders Keepers, a 1999 novel by Catherine Palmer
- Finders Keepers: Selected Prose 1971–2001, a 2001 collection of prose by Seamus Heaney
- Finders Keepers, a 2001 novel by Linnea Sinclair
- Finders Keepers, a 2002 novel by Sean Costello
- Finders Keepers?, a 2003 children's book by Robert Arnett
- Finders Keepers, a 2004 novel by Ann Halam
- Finders Keepers, a 2005 novel by Shirl Henke
- Finders Keepers, a 2006 novel by Karin Kallmaker
- Finders Keepers, a 2008 novel by L. A. Banks
- Finders Keepers, a 2010 novel by Marilyn Kaye, the fourth installment in the Gifted series
- Finders Keepers, a 2012 novel by Belinda Bauer
- Finders Keepers, a 2012 novel by David Housewright
- Finders Keepers (King novel), a 2015 book by Stephen King
- Finders, Keepers (Saxena novel), a 2015 novel by Sapan Saxena

=== Non-fiction ===
- Finders-Keepers – Finding and Keeping the Man You Want, a 1976 self-help book written pseudonymously by David Duke as James Konrad and Dorothy Vanderbilt
- Finders Keepers: The Story of a Man Who Found $1 Million, a 2002 book by Mark Bowden

== Film ==
- Finders Keepers (1921 film), a film starring Dorothy Bridges
- Finders Keepers (1928 film), a film based on a book by Mary Roberts Rinehart
- Finders Keepers (1952 film), an American comedy film directed by Fred de Cordova
- Finders Keepers (1966 film), a film starring Cliff Richard and the Shadows
  - Finders Keepers (Cliff Richard album), the soundtrack, by Cliff Richard and the Shadows
- Finders Keepers (1984 film), a comedy film starring Michael O'Keefe and Beverly D'Angelo
- Finders Keepers (2014 film), a thriller/horror film starring Jaime Pressly
- Finders Keepers (2015 film), a documentary about a legal battle over ownership of a severed leg

== Television ==
=== Episodes ===
- "Finders Keepers" (Family Guy), 2013 TV series episode

and also

- "Finder's Keepers", Corduroy episode 13a (2001)
- "Finders Keepers", Antiques Roadshow (American) season 17, episode 27 (2013)
- "Finders Keepers", Armchair Detectives episode 8 (2017)
- "Finders Keepers", Badger series 3, episode 7 (2000)
- "Finders Keepers", Beryl's Lot series 2, episode 3 (1975)
- "Finders Keepers", Blue Heelers season 9, episode 21 (2002)
- "Finders Keepers", Cake (2019) season 4, episode 3 (2021)
- "Finders Keepers", Care Bears: Unlock the Magic season 1, episode 39 (2019)
- "Finders Keepers", Casualty series 12, episode 8 (1997)
- "Finders Keepers", CHiPs season 5, episode 9 (1981)
- "Finders Keepers", ChuckleVision series 8, episode 12 (1996)
- "Finders Keepers", Clangers (2015) series 3, episode 11 (2019)
- "Finders Keepers", Clifford's Puppy Days season 2, episode 2a (2005)
- "Finders Keepers", Cluedo (British) series 4, episode 1 (1993)
- "Finders Keepers", Davey and Goliath season 4, episode 4 (1971)
- "Finders Keepers", ER season 9, episode 18 (2003)
- "Finders Keepers?", George and Mildred series 5, episode 1 (1979)
- "Finders Keepers", Grace Under Fire season 5, episode 6 (1997)
- "Finders Keepers", Health and Efficiency series 2, episode 6 (1995)
- "Finders Keepers", Jesse season 1, episode 21 (1999)
- "Finders Keepers", Johnson and Friends series 3, episode 19 (1994)
- "Finders Keepers?", Mickey Mouse Funhouse season 2, episode 27b (2024)
- "Finders Keepers", Muppet Babies (2018) season 2, episode 3a (2019)
- "Finders Keepers", My Pet Monster episode 7a (1987)
- "Finders Keepers", Numbers season 3, episode 13 (2007)
- "Finders Keepers", Perfect Strangers season 6, episode 13 (1991)
- "Finders Keepers", Power Rangers Beast Morphers, season 2, episode 13 (2020)
- "Finders Keepers", Private Secretary season 3, episode 24 (1955)
- "Finders Keepers", Sesame Tree series 1, episode 6 (2008)
- "Finders Keepers", Shazam! season 3, episode 4 (1976)
- "Finders Keepers", Shining Time Station season 1, episode 13 (1989)
- "Finders Keepers" (Star Wars: Young Jedi Adventures), an episode of Star Wars: Young Jedi Adventures
- "Finders Keepers", Stingers season 2, episode 6 (1999)
- "Finders Keepers", The Bill series 8, episode 102 (1992)
- "Finders Keepers", The Brothers Flub episode 13a (1999)
- "Finders Keepers", The Detectives (1959) season 3, episode 26 (1962)
- "Finders Keepers", The Dumping Ground series 9, episode 14 (2022)
- "Finders Keepers", The Gentle Touch series 5, episode 1 (1984)
- "Finders Keepers", The Jackie Gleason Show season 4, episode 11 (1956)
- "Finders Keepers", The Littlest Hobo season 4, episode 5 (1982)
- "Finders Keepers", The Lone Ranger (1949) season 1, episode 13 (1949)
- "Finders Keepers", The Puzzle Place season 1, episode 31 (1995)
- "Finders Keepers", The Rousters episode 3 (1983)
- "Finders Keepers", ToddWorld season 2, episode 8b (2007)
- "Finders Keepers", Too Close for Comfort season 5, episode 11 (1985)
- "Finders Keepers", Trapper John, M.D. season 2, episode 12 (1981)
- "Finders Keepers", Underground Ernie episode 8 (2006)
- "Finders Keepers", Z-Cars series 4, episode 4 (1964)
- "Finders Keepers", Zorro (1957) season 2, episode 39 (1959)
- "Finders Key-pers", Arthur season 2, episode 19b (1998)
- "Finders Key-pers", Imagination Movers season 1, episode 14 (2008)

=== Shows ===
- Finders Keepers (1981 game show), a 1981–1985 UK children's game show produced by the BBC and hosted by Richard Stilgoe
- Finders Keepers (American game show), a 1987–1989 children's game show
  - Finders Keepers (1991 game show), a 1991–2006 UK children's game show based on the American show and shown on ITV
- Finders Keepers (Australian TV series), a 1991–1992 children's show
- Finders Keepers (British drama TV series), a 2024 miniseries directed by Philip John

== Music ==
- Finders Keepers (band), a UK band featuring future members of Trapeze
- "Finders, Keepers", an album by Trine Rein

=== Songs ===
- "Finders Keepers" (You Me at Six song), 2009
- "Finders Keepers" (Mabel song), 2017
- "Finders Keepers", a song by the Beach Boys from Surfin' U.S.A.
- "Finders Keepers", a song by Chairmen of the Board
- "Finders Keepers", a song by Miriam Bryant

== Others ==
- Finders Keepers (1985 video game), a 1985 game, first in the Magic Knight series

== See also ==
- Finders Keepers, Lovers Weepers!, a 1968 film by Russ Meyer
- "Finders Keepers, Losers Weepers", a 1965 song by Elvis Presley
