= Summer holiday =

Summer holiday may refer to:

- Summer vacation, a holiday in the summertime between school years

== Film ==
- Summer Holiday (1948 film), an American musical starring Mickey Rooney
- Summer Holiday (1963 film), a British musical starring Cliff Richard, and later stage adaptations
- Summer Holiday (2000 film) (Ha yat dik mo mo cha), a Hong Kong romance film starring Sammi Cheng
- "Summer Holiday" (The Young Ones), an episode of the TV series The Young Ones
- "Summer Holiday", an episode of the TV series On the Yorkshire Buses

== Music ==
- Summer Holiday (album), a soundtrack album from the 1963 film, by Cliff Richard and The Shadows
- Summer Holiday, a 1995 album by BZN
- Summer Holiday (EP), a 2021 EP by Dreamcatcher
- "Summer Holiday" (song), the title song from the 1963 film

== See also ==
- Holiday (disambiguation)
- "Holiday Rap"
