= Wonderful Life (Cliff Richard album) =

1964 soundtrack album by Cliff Richard with The Shadows

Soundtrack album by Cliff Richard with The Shadows
- Released: 3 July 1964
- Recorded: EMI Studios, London
- Label: Columbia (EMI)
- Producer: Norrie Paramor

Cliff Richard with The Shadows chronology
When in Spain (1963)	Wonderful Life (1964)	Aladdin and His Wonderful Lamp (1964)

Singles from Wonderful Life
- 1. "Theme for Young Lovers" Released: 28 February 1964; 2. "On the Beach" Released: 26 June 1964

Wonderful Life is a soundtrack album by Cliff Richard with The Shadows to the 1964 film Wonderful Life. It is their third film soundtrack album and Richard's eleventh album overall. The album reached number 2 in the UK Albums Chart, spending 8 weeks in the top 3 and 23 weeks on in the top 20, but was a marked decline from their previous soundtrack album Summer Holiday that had spent 14 weeks at number 1.

The album had two lead singles, the first being the instrumental "Theme for Young Lovers" from the Shadows, followed by "On the Beach" with Richard being backed by the Shadows.

Some of the recordings on the album are not those used on the actual film soundtrack, including the title song. The vocal takes are different and in some cases the orchestrations are also altered slightly. The recordings on the album are generally more polished than the soundtrack ones. The Shadows' recording line-up included Brian Locking on bass guitar although by the time filming commenced John Rostill had replaced him.

The vinyl LP released on the Columbia label in the UK featured an inner sleeve with a storyline outlining the plot and the position of each of the musical numbers, illustrated with stills from the film.

Released in the US with the title Swingers Paradise the album did not chart.

== Track listing ==
1. "Wonderful Life" (Bennett/Welch) - Cliff Richard and A.B.S. Orchestra
2. "A Girl in Every Port" (Myers/Cass) - Cliff Richard, and A.B.S. Orchestra
3. "Walkin'" (Hank Marvin/Welch) - The Shadows
4. "A Little Imagination" (Myers/Cass) - Cliff Richard and A.B.S. Orchestra
5. "Home" - Cliff Richard and A.B.S. Orchestra
6. "On the Beach" (Marvin/Richard/Welch) - Cliff Richard and The Shadows
7. "In the Stars" (Myers/Cass) - Cliff Richard and A.B.S. Orchestra
8. "We Love a Movie" (Myers/Cass) - Cliff Richard and A.B.S. Orchestra
9. "Do You Remember" (Marvin/Welch) - Cliff Richard, The Shadows, and The Norrie Paramor Strings
10. "What've I Gotta Do" (Marvin/Welch) - Cliff Richard and The Shadows
11. "Theme for Young Lovers" (Welch) - The Shadows
12. "All Kinds of People" (Myers/Cass) - Cliff Richard and A.B.S. Orchestra
13. "A Matter of Moments" (Welch) - Cliff Richard, The Shadows, and The Norrie Paramor Strings
14. "Youth and Experience" (Myers/Cass) - Cliff Richard and A.B.S. Orchestra

== Personnel ==
Cliff Richard with the Shadows

- Cliff Richard – lead vocals
- Hank Marvin – lead guitar
- Bruce Welch – rhythm guitar
- Brian Locking – bass guitar
- Brian Bennett – drums

== Chart performance ==
Chart (1964)	Peak position
Australian Albums (Kent)	5
Norwegian Albums (VG-lista)	4
UK Albums (OCC)	2
Chart (2005)	Peak position
UK Soundtrack Albums (OCC)	43
