= Dancing Shoes (Cliff Richard and the Shadows song) =

1963 single by Cliff Richard and the Shadows

Single by Cliff Richard and the Shadows

from the album Summer Holiday
- A-side: "Summer Holiday"
- Released: 15 February 1963
- Recorded: 5 May 1962
- Studio: EMI Studios, London
- Genre: Pop
- Length: 2:09
- Label: Columbia
- Songwriters: Bruce Welch; Hank Marvin
- Producer: Norrie Paramor

Cliff Richard and the Shadows singles chronology
"The Next Time" (1962)	"Summer Holiday" / "Dancing Shoes" (1963)	"Lucky Lips" (1962)

"Dancing Shoes" is a song by Cliff Richard and the Shadows, released in February 1963 as the B-side to the number-one hit "Summer Holiday". It is taken from the Summer Holiday film and was also included on the soundtrack album.

== Background and recording ==
In Summer Holiday, Cliff Richard plays the main character, Don, who along with his friends travel across Europe in a double-decker bus. Don sings "Dancing Shoes" to a shepherdess in a Yugoslavian field whilst the group are gallivanting about surrounded by haystacks and straw.

Richard has described "Dancing Shoes" as one of his favourite songs in the film. Written by the Shadows' Bruce Welch and Hank Marvin, Richard also stated that "[t]he Shadows had a knack of writing songs like – Someone would say, 'We want a bright, sort of bouncy song – sort of bright country, yellow hay, blue skies.' And they'd come back next afternoon and there they'd have it. It's Dancing Shoes. Really knocked us all out. I must admit, in the film, it still looks great fun".

The film version of "Dancing Shoes" differs from the album and single version due to the Musicians' Union stating at the time that film and commercial versions of songs had to be different. The film version was recorded at Elstree Studios and features actors Melvyn Hayes, Teddy Green, and Jeremy Bulloch singing backing vocals, whereas on the commercial version, these vocals are sung by Marvin and Welch. The commercial version was recorded at EMI Studios on 5 May 1962, which was one of the first sessions with bassist Brian Locking after the departure of Jet Harris in April.

== Release ==
"Summer Holiday" and "Dancing Shoes" were released as a single in February 1963 with both sides being touted they would be big hits. Whilst "Summer Holiday" was the side that charted in the majority of territories, on some charts "Dancing Shoes" also charted. In the UK, whilst the Record Retailer chart (the canonical official chart) only lists "Summer Holiday" as charting, the chart by Disc lists the two songs as a pairing, topping its chart. On the New Musical Express chart, due to the way it was compiled at the time, B-sides were allowed to be listed separately, so "Dancing Shoes" spent two weeks on the chart, peaking at number 25, whilst "Summer Holiday" would go on to top the chart. In Canada, the pairing jointly topped the Toronto CHUM chart, however, in Vancouver, "Dancing Shoes" solely topped the CFUN chart for three weeks.

== Personnel ==
- Cliff Richard – lead vocals
- Hank Marvin – lead guitar, backing vocals
- Bruce Welch – rhythm guitar, backing vocals
- Brian Locking – bass guitar
- Brian Bennett – drums

== Charts ==
Chart (1963)	Peak position
Canada (CFUN)	1
Hong Kong	6
South Africa (SARMDA)	4
Sweden (Kvällstoppen)	9
Sweden (Tio i Topp)	9
UK New Musical Express Top 30	25

== Cover versions ==
- In December 1977, Finnish rockabilly band Teddy and the Tigers released a cover of "Dancing Shoes" as their debut single. It peaked at number 16 on the Finnish charts.
