= Cliff's Hit Album =

1963 compilation album by Cliff Richard

Greatest hits album by Cliff Richard
- Released: July 1963
- Recorded: July 1958 – December 1961
- Label: Columbia
- Producer: Norrie Paramor

Cliff Richard chronology
Summer Holiday (1963)	Cliff's Hit Album (1963)	When in Spain (1963)

Alternative cover
- Canadian release of the "Living Doll" album

Cliff's Hit Album is Cliff Richard's first compilation album and ninth album overall. It was released in July 1963 and reached number 2 on the UK Albums Chart. The album contains 14 songs from his singles released between August 1958 and May 1962. It includes all Richard's singles in this period that made the top 3 of the UK Singles Chart.

In Canada, the album was retitled "Living Doll" and was released in September 1963 and spent three weeks at number 1 on Chum's Album Index during October and eight weeks in the top 5 altogether.

== Release ==
Cliff's Hit Album was released as an LP album on Columbia in the UK in July 1963. It has not been released on CD, but all tracks are available on other compilation albums.

The Canadian version of the album titled Living Doll was released on Capitol Records and tailored the track-listing to include two recent Canadian hits "Bachelor Boy" and "Lucky Lips" while excluding "A Voice in the Wilderness" and "I'm Looking Out the Window" which had not charted locally.

== Track listing ==
Side One
No.	Title	Writer(s)	Length
1.	"Move It" (A-side, August 1958, No. 2)	Ian Samwell	2:23
2.	"Living Doll" (A-side, July 1959, No. 1)	Lionel Bart	2:38
3.	"Travellin' Light" (A-side, October 1959, No. 1)	Roy C. Bennett and Sid Tepper	2:31
4.	"A Voice in the Wilderness" (A-side, January 1960, No. 2)	Norrie Paramor, Bunny Lewis	2:36
5.	"Fall in Love with You" (A-side, March 1960, No. 2)	Ian Samwell	2:30
6.	"Please Don't Tease" (A-side, June 1960, No. 1)	Bruce Welch, Peter Chester	2:59
7.	"Nine Times Out of Ten" (A-side, September 1960, No. 3)	Otis Blackwell, Waldense Hall	2:07

Side Two
No.	Title	Writer(s)	Length
1.	"I Love You" (A-side, December 1960, No. 1)	Bruce Welch	2:02
2.	"Theme for a Dream" (A-side, February 1961, No. 3)	Mort Garson, Earl Shuman	2:06
3.	"A Girl Like You" (A-side, June 1961, No. 3)	Jerry Lordan	2:31
4.	"When the Girl in Your Arms Is the Girl in Your Heart" (A-side, October 1961, No. 3)	Roy C. Bennett and Sid Tepper	2:25
5.	"The Young Ones" (A-side, January 1962, No. 1)	Roy C. Bennett and Sid Tepper	3:09
6.	"I'm Looking Out the Window" (A-side, May 1962, No. 2)	Don Raye, John Jacob Niles	2:16
7.	"Do You Wanna Dance" (B-side, May 1962, No. 2)	Bobby Freeman	2:16

== Personnel ==
- Cliff Richard – vocals
- Hank Marvin – lead guitar, backing vocals
- Bruce Welch – rhythm guitar, backing vocals
- Jet Harris – bass guitar
- Tony Meehan – drums
- Brian Bennett – drums (tracks 6 and 7, side two)
- Mike Sammes Singers – backing vocals (track 2 and 4, side two)
- Norrie Paramor – his orchestra

== Chart performance ==
Chart (1963)	Peak position
UK Albums (OCC)	2
Canada Albums (CHUM)	1
Norwegian Albums (VG-lista)	3
