= The Time in Between (disambiguation) =

The Time in Between is a novel by Canadian author David Bergen. It may also refer to:

- The Time in Between (María Dueñas novel), 2009;
- The Time in Between (TV series), a Spanish television series;
- The Time in Between (song), a 1965 song by Cliff Richard.
