= Themes for Young Lovers =

Studio album by Percy Faith and His Orchestra
- Released: 1963
- Genre: Easy listening
- Label: Columbia
- Producer: Ed Kleban

Percy Faith and His Orchestra chronology
Shangri-La! (1963)	Themes for Young Lovers (1963)	Great Folk Themes (1964)

Professional ratings
Review scores
Source	Rating
AllMusic	3.5/5 stars
Cashbox	Positive (Popular picks)

Themes for Young Lovers is a 1963 album by Percy Faith and His Orchestra. It was released in 1963 by Columbia Records (catalog no. CL2023).

== Chart performance ==
The album debuted on Billboard magazine's Top LP's chart on June 29, 1963, and peaked at the No. 12 spot, and remained on the chart for 13 weeks. It debuted on the Cashbox pop albums chart in the issue dated June 15, 1963, and remained on the chart for a total of 35 weeks, peaking at number 13.

== Reception ==
The initial Cashbox magazine review stated that "The talented orkster has transformed the hits, via his own professional mixture of winds and horns, into a gratifying, adult experience," noting that "The band is superb in form". Later AllMusic gave the album a rating of three-and-a-half stars. Reviewer Eugene Chadbourne wrote: "Generously buoyed by tunes from the best known pop hitmaking teams of the late '50s and early '60s, this selection grooves along with a rhythmic bounce all its own."

== Track listing ==
Side one

1. "I Will Follow You"
2. "The End of the World"
3. "Rhythm of the Rain"
4. "Go Away Little Girl"
5. "Amy"
6. "On Broadway"

Side two

1. "Up on the Roof"
2. "Can't Get Used to Losing You"
3. "Our Day Will Come"
4. "All Alone Am I"
5. "My Coloring Book"
6. "Theme for Young Lovers"
7. "Guinevere"

== Charts ==
Chart (1963–1964)	Peak position
US Billboard Top LPs	12
US Cashbox Top 100 Albums	13
US Cashbox Top 50 Stereo	11
