= Cinderella (Cliff Richard and the Shadows album) =

1967 pantomime cast album by Cliff Richard and the Shadows

Cast recording by Cliff Richard and the Shadows
- Released: January 1967
- Recorded: October–November 1966
- Studio: EMI Abbey Road
- Genre: Pop, Pantomime
- Label: Columbia - SCX 6103
- Producer: Norrie Paramor

Cliff Richard chronology
Finders Keepers (1966)	Cinderella (1967)	Don't Stop Me Now! (1967)

Singles from Cinderella
- 1. "In the Country" Released: December 1966

Cinderella is a 1967 pantomime cast album by Cliff Richard, the Shadows, the Norrie Paramor orchestra and other members of the pantomime cast. The album is Richard's nineteenth album.

One single, "In the Country" (Richard, with the Shadows backing) was released from the album in December 1966 and reached number 6 in the UK Singles Chart. The album itself reached number 30 in the UK Album Charts in a 5-week run in the top 40.

== Track listing ==
1. "Welcome to Stoneybrooke" - The Norrie Paramor Orchestra, with The Mike Sammes Singers
2. "Why Wasn't I Born Rich" - Cliff Richard and The Shadows, with the Norrie Paramor Brass
3. "Peace and Quiet" - Cliff Richard, with the Norrie Paramor Orchestra
4. "The Flyder and the Spy" - The Shadows
5. "Poverty" - Cliff Richard and The Shadows, with the Norrie Paramor Orchestra and The Mike Sammes Singers
6. "The Hunt" - Cliff Richard and The Shadows, with the Norrie Paramor Orchestra and The Mike Sammes Singers
7. "In the Country" - Cliff Richard and The Shadows
8. "Come Sunday" - Cliff Richard and The Shadows
9. "Dare I Love Him So" - Jackie Lee, with the Norrie Paramor Orchestra and The Mike Sammes Singers
10. "If Our Dreams Came True" - Cliff Richard and Jackie Lee, with The Norrie Paramor Orchestra
11. "Autumn" - The Shadows, with the Norrie Paramor Strings
12. "The King's Place" - Cliff Richard and the Shadows, with The Norrie Paramor Orchestra and The Mike Sammes Singers
13. "Peace and Quiet (Reprise)" - Cliff Richard and The Shadows
14. "She Needs Him More than Me" - Cliff Richard and The Shadows
15. "Hey Doctor Man" - Cliff Richard and The Shadows

== Personnel ==
Taken from the sleeve notes:

- Cliff Richard - Lead vocals
- Norrie Paramor - producer, arranger and conductor
- Norrie Paramor orchestra
- Jackie Lee - vocals
- Mike Sammes Singers - backing vocals

The Shadows:

- Hank Marvin - lead guitar, backing vocals
- Bruce Welch - rhythm guitar, backing vocals
- John Rostill - bass guitar
- Brian Bennett - drums

Music and lyrics by the Shadows.
