= Percy Faith =

Canadian-American bandleader, orchestrator and composer (1908–1976)

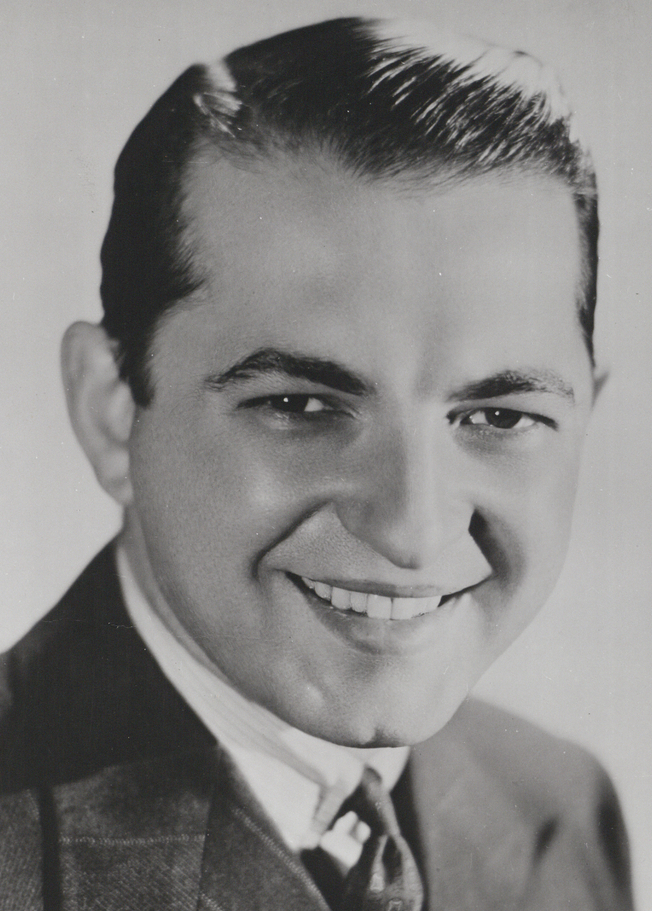

Background information
- Born: April 7, 1908; Toronto, Ontario, Canada
- Died: February 9, 1976 (aged 67) Encino, California, U.S.
- Occupations: Bandleader, orchestrator, composer
- Website: www.percyfaith.info

Percy Faith (April 7, 1908 – February 9, 1976) was a Canadian-American bandleader, orchestrator, composer and conductor, known for his lush arrangements of instrumental ballads and Christmas standards. He is often credited with popularizing the "easy listening" or "mood music" format. He became a staple of American popular music in the 1950s and continued well into the 1960s. Although his professional orchestra-leading career began at the height of the swing era, he refined and rethought orchestration techniques, including use of large string sections, to soften and fill out the brass-dominated popular music of the 1940s.

== Early life ==
Faith was born and raised in Toronto, Ontario, Canada, the oldest of eight children. His parents, Abraham and Minnie Faith (née Rottenberg), were Jewish. He played violin and piano as a child, and performed in theatres and at Massey Hall.

== Career ==
After his hands were badly burned in a fire, Faith turned to conducting, and his live orchestras used the new medium of radio broadcasting. Beginning with stations CKNC and CKCL, he was a staple of the Canadian Broadcasting Corporation's live-music broadcasting from 1933 to 1940, when he resettled in Chicago, Illinois. In the early 1940s, Faith was orchestra leader for The Carnation Contented Hour on NBC. From 1938 to 1940 on the MBS radio network, and from 1948 to 1949 on the CBS radio network, he also served as the orchestra leader on The Coca-Cola Hour (also called The Pause That Refreshes). The orchestral accordionist John Serry Sr. collaborated with Faith in some of these broadcasts. Faith also led the orchestra on The Woolworth Hour on CBS radio (1955–1957).

He moved from Canada to Great Neck, New York, and became a naturalized citizen of the United States in 1945. He made many recordings for Voice of America. After working briefly for Decca Records, he worked for Mitch Miller at Columbia Records, where he turned out dozens of albums and provided arrangements for many of the pop singers of the 1950s, including Tony Bennett, Doris Day, Johnny Mathis for Mathis's 1958 Christmas album titled Merry Christmas, and Guy Mitchell, for whom Faith co-wrote with Carl Sigman Mitchell's number-one single, "My Heart Cries for You".

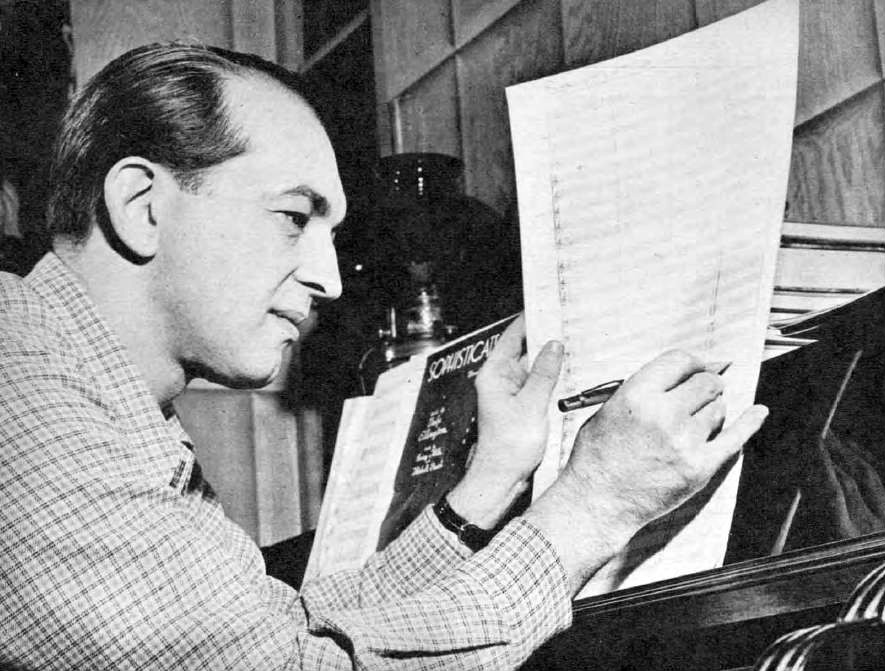
Faith at work in 1949

Faith's most famous and remembered recordings are "Delicado" (1952), "The Song from Moulin Rouge" (1953) and "Theme from A Summer Place" (1959), which won the Grammy Award for Record of the Year in 1961. Faith remains the only artist to have the best selling single of the year during both the pop singer era ("Song from Moulin Rouge") and the rock era ("Theme from A Summer Place"); and he is one of only three artists, along with Elvis Presley and The Beatles, to have the best selling single of the year twice. The B-side of "Song from the Moulin Rouge" was "Swedish Rhapsody" by Hugo Alfvén. In 1961 his fame in Sweden grew quickly as his work Mucho Gusto became the theme music for the sports broadcasts of Sveriges Radio.

Although Faith initially drew from the worlds of Broadway, Hollywood and Latin music for many of his top-selling 1950s recordings, he enjoyed popularity starting in 1962 with his orchestral versions of popular rock and pop hits of the day. His Themes for Young Lovers album was a top seller during this era and introduced rock compositions to a middle-aged audience and the Faith sound to a younger generation of listeners. With the success of Columbia record-mate Ray Conniff's chorus and orchestra during this same time, Faith began using a chorus (usually all female in most of his recordings, but used a mixed chorus on his albums Leaving on a Jet Plane and I Think I Love You, which were released in 1970 and 1971 respectively) in several popular albums from the mid-1960s on. Faith's first single with a female chorus, "Yellow Days", was a substantial hit in the MOR (Middle of the Road) easy listening radio format of the mid-1960s. Faith continued to enjoy airplay and consistent album sales throughout the early 1970s, and received a second Grammy award in 1969 for his album Love Theme from 'Romeo and Juliet'.

Although best known for his recording career, Faith also occasionally scored motion pictures, and received an Academy Award nomination for his adaptation of the song score for the Doris Day musical feature, Love Me or Leave Me. His other film scores included romantic comedies and dramatic features such as Tammy Tell Me True (1961), I'd Rather Be Rich (1964), The Third Day (1965) and The Oscar (1966). Faith also composed the theme for the NBC series The Virginian.

With the advent of harder rock sounds in the 1970s, Faith's elegant arrangements fell out of favour with the listening and record-buying public, although he continued to release albums as diverse and contemporary as Jesus Christ Superstar and Black Magic Woman. He released one album of country music and two albums of disco-oriented arrangements toward the end of his forty-year career, his last recording being a disco-style reworking of "Theme from a Summer Place", titled "Summer Place '76", which was a minor and posthumous hit.

== Personal life ==
Faith had two children, Marilyn and Peter, with his wife Mary (née Palange), whom he married in 1928. She died in Los Angeles in 1997.

== Death ==
Faith died of cancer in Encino, California, and is interred in the Hillside Memorial Park Cemetery in Culver City, California.

== Discography ==
=== Albums ===
Percy Faith placed 21 albums on the Billboard Hot 200 best sellers chart through 1972, making him one of the more successful easy listening acts in terms of sales. 1963's Themes for Young Lovers was by far his biggest seller, peaking at No. 32 on the chart and followed by three sequel albums "for young lovers". Throughout his career he was associated with Columbia Records. Occasionally he had albums released on the Columbia imprint Harmony Records.

- Continental Music (1951)
- Delicado (1952)
- Carnival Rhythms (1952)
- Music from "Kismet" (1953)
- Music from Hollywood (1954)
- Music of Christmas (1954)
- Music Until Midnight (1954)
- Percy Faith Plays Romantic Music (1954)
- Amour, Amor, Amore (1955)
- Girl Meets Boy (with Jerry Vale, Peggy King, and Felicia Sanders) (1955)
- Music for Her (1955)
- Wish Upon a Star (with Peggy King) (1955)
- It's So Peaceful in the Country (with Mitch Miller) (1956)
- The Most Happy Fella (1956)
- My Fair Lady (1956)
- Passport to Romance (1956)
- Swing Low in Hi-Fi (1956)
- Adventure in the Sun (1957)
- The Columbia Album of George Gershwin (1957)
- Li'l Abner (1957)
- Viva: The Music of Mexico (1957)
- The CBS Album of Victor Herbert (2 record set, 1958)
- Hallelujah! (1958)
- South Pacific (1958)
- Touchdown! (1958)
- North and South of the Border (1958)
- Bouquet (1959)
- Malagueña: Music of Cuba (1959)
- A Night with Sigmund Romberg (1959)
- Porgy and Bess (1959)
- Music of Christmas (re-recorded in stereo, 1959)
- Bon Voyage!: Continental Souvenirs (1960)
- Jealousy (1960)
- A Night with Jerome Kern (1960)
- The Sound of Music (1960)
- Camelot (1961)
- Carefree (1961)
- Mucho Gusto! More Music of Mexico (1961)
- Subways Are for Sleeping (1961)
- Tara's Theme from Gone With The Wind (1961)
- This Fling Called Love (with Eileen Farrell) (1961)
- Bouquet of Love (1962)
- Exotic Strings (1962)
- Hollywood's Great Themes (1962)
- The Music of Brazil! (1962)
- American Serenade (1963)
- A Look at Monaco (1963)
- Shangri-La! (1963) No. 80 Hot 200
- Themes for Young Lovers (1963) No. 32 Hot 200
- Great Folk Themes (1964) No. 103 Hot 200
- The Love Goddesses (1964)
- More Themes for Young Lovers (1964) No. 110 Hot 200
- Broadway Bouquet (1965) No. 101 Hot 200
- Do I Hear a Waltz? (1965)
- Latin Themes for Young Lovers (1965) No. 6 CAN AC
- Bim! Bam!! Boom!!! (1966)
- Christmas Is... (1966)
- The Oscar (1966)
- Themes for the "In" Crowd (1966)
- Born Free and Other Great Movie Themes (1967) No. 152 Hot 200
- Today's Themes for Young Lovers (1967) No. 111 Hot 200
- Angel of the Morning (1968) No. 95 Hot 200
- For Those in Love (1968) No. 121 Hot 200
- I Concentrate On You (1968)
- Love Theme from "Romeo and Juliet" (1969) No. 134 Hot 200
- Those Were the Days (1969) No. 88 Hot 200
- Windmills of Your Mind (1969) No. 194 Hot 200
- The Beatles Album (1970) No. 179 Hot 200
- Held Over! Today's Great Movie Themes (1970) No. 196 Hot 200
- Leaving on a Jet Plane (1970) No. 88 Hot 200; No. 84 CAN
- Koga Melodies (1970)Sony, Japan
- Black Magic Woman (1971) No. 184 Hot 200
- I Think I Love You (1971) No. 198 Hot 200
- Jesus Christ Superstar (1971) No. 186 Hot 200
- Day By Day (1972) No. 197 Hot 200
- Joy (1972) No. 176 Hot 200
- Ryoichi Hattori Melodies (1972) Sony, Japan
- Clair (1973)
- Corazon (1973)
- My Love (1973)
- The Entertainer (1974) (withdrawn/reissued)
- Chinatown Featuring the Entertainer (1974)
- Clair (1974)
- Country Bouquet (1974)
- Live in Japan, On May 19. 1974 at Tokyo Kosei Nenkin Kaikan (1974)Sony, Japan.
- The Great Concert (1974)2LP set Same concert as above and full concert. Sony, Japan
- New Thing (1974)
- Disco Party (1975)
- Viva!/Mucho Gusto! (1975)
- Summer Place '76 (1976)

=== Compilations ===
- Greatest Hits (1960)
- Forever Young (2-LP, 1968)
- Younger Than Springtime (1970) Harmony Records
- Sounds of music (1970) Harmony
- Raindrops Keep Fallin' On My Head (1971) Australia
- A Summer Place (1971) Harmony
- A Time for Love (2-LP, 1971)
- All-Time Greatest Hits (1972) No. 200 Hot 200
- Everynight at the movies (1972) Harmony
- Remembering the hits of the '60s (1974)
- All about Percy Faith (1975) 2-LP set Sony, Japan
- Great Moments of Percy Faith (1976) 2-LP set
- 16 Most Requested Songs (1989)
- Ultimate Collection (2001) 3-CD set, Australia
- The Great Percy Faith (2005) 3-CD set, Australia
- Definitive collection (2014) 2-CD set Real Gone Music

=== Singles ===
Faith produced the following singles:

- "I Cross My Fingers" {Vocal: Russ Emery} US No. 20, 1950
- "All My Love" (US No. 7, 1950)
- "Christmas in Killarney" {Vocals: Shillelagh Singers} US No. 28 – December 1950
- "On Top of Old Smokey" {Vocals: Burl Ives} US No. 10, 1951
- "When the Saints Go Marching In" (US No. 29 – September 1951)
- "I Want to Be Near You" (US No. 30 – September 1951)
- "Delicado" (US No. 1, 1952)
- "Swedish Rhapsody (Midsummer Vigil)" / (US No. 21, 1953)
- "Moulin Rouge Theme" {Vocals: Felicia Sanders} US No. 1, 1953
- "Return to Paradise" (US No. 19 – June 1953)
- "Many Times" (US No. 30 – December 1953)
- "Dream, Dream, Dream" (US No. 25 – May 1954)
- "The Bandit" (US No. 25 – October 1954)
- "Valley Valparaiso" (US No. 53, 1956)
- "We All Need Love" (US No. 67, 1956)
- "With a Little Bit of Luck" (US No. 82, 1956)
- "Till" (US No. 63, 1957)
- "Theme from A Summer Place" (US No. 1, 1960)
- "Theme for Young Lovers" (US No. 35, 1960)
- "Theme from "The Dark at the Top of the Stairs"" (US No. 101 – November 1960)
- "Sons and Lovers" (US No. 111 – September 1963)
- "The Sound of Surf" (US No. 111 – September 1963)
- "Yellow Days" (AC No. 13, 1967)
- "Can't Take My Eyes Off You" (AC No. 24, 1967)
- "For Those in Love" (1968)
- "Zorba" (AC No. 36, 1969)
- "Theme from A Summer Place" (vocal version) US No. 111 – July 1969 – AC No. 26, 1969
- "The April Fools" (1969)
- "Airport Love Theme" (1970)
- "Everything's All Right" (AC No. 31 – February 1971)
- "Theme from Summer of '42" (1971)
- "Bach's Lunch" (1972)
- "Crunchy Granola Suite" (AC No. 16, 1973); (AC CAN No. 85)
- "Hill Where the Lord Hides" (AC No. 44, 1974)
- "Theme from "Chinatown"" (AC No. 35, 1974); (AC CAN No. 42)
- "Summer Place '76" (AC No. 13, 1976); (AC CAN No. 20)
