= Intern (disambiguation) =

An intern is one who works in a temporary position with an emphasis on on-the-job training rather than merely employment.

Intern or internship may also refer to:

- Internship (medicine), training for a physician who has completed medical school
- Intern (computer science), an immutable copy of a string

== Film and television ==
- The Interns (film), a 1962 film starring Michael Callan and Cliff Robertson
  - The New Interns, the 1964 sequel film, starring Michael Callan and Dean Jones
  - The Interns (TV series), a television spin-off of the 1960s films, starring Broderick Crawford
- The Intern (2000 film), starring Dominique Swain, Joan Rivers, Peggy Lipton, and Kathy Griffin
- Scrubs: Interns, a 2009 web series based on the television series Scrubs
- Interns (TV series), a Russian television medical sitcom
- The Internship, a 2013 film starring Vince Vaughn and Owen Wilson
- The Intern (2015 film), starring Robert De Niro, Anne Hathaway, and Rene Russo
- The Intern (2026 film), a South Korean remake of The Intern (2015 film)
- Hippocrate (TV series), known as Interns in some markets

== Music ==
- The Interns (band), a Welsh pop group
- The Viceroys, Jamaican vocal group also known as the Interns

== See also ==
- Internment
