= Finders Keepers (Cliff Richard album) =

1966 soundtrack album by Cliff Richard and the Shadows

Soundtrack album by Cliff Richard and The Shadows
- Released: 9 December 1966
- Recorded: May 1965, Apr-Sep 1966
- Studio: EMI Abbey Road
- Label: Columbia (EMI)
- Producer: Norrie Paramor

Cliff Richard chronology
Kinda Latin (1966)	Finders Keepers (1966)	Cinderella (1967)

Singles from Finders Keepers
- 1. "Time Drags By" Released: April 1966

The 1966 Finders Keepers album by Cliff Richard and the Shadows is the soundtrack to the film of the same name. It was their fourth film soundtrack album and Richard's eighteenth album overall.

"Time Drags By" was released as the lead single in October 1966 and reached number 10 in the UK Singles Chart. The album was released in tandem with the movie in December and reached number 6 in the UK Album Charts, in an 18-week run in the top 40.

== Track listing ==
1. "Finders Keepers" (Cliff Richard and The Shadows)
2. "Time Drags By" (Cliff Richard and The Shadows)
3. "Washerwoman" (Cliff Richard and The Shadows)
4. "La La La song" (Cliff Richard and The Shadows)
5. "My Way" (The Shadows)
6. "Oh Senorita" (Cliff Richard and The Shadows)
7. "Spanish Music" (The Shadows)
8. "Fiesta" (Cliff Richard and The Shadows)
9. "This Day" (Cliff Richard and The Shadows)
10. "Paella" (Cliff Richard and The Shadows)
11. "Finders Keepers"/"My Way"/"Paella"/"Fiesta" (Medley) (The Shadows)
12. "Run to the Door" (Cliff Richard) (not in the film)
13. "Where Did the Summer Go" (Cliff Richard) (not in the film)
14. "Into Each Life Some Rain Must Fall" (Cliff Richard and The Shadows) (not in the film)

== Releases ==
The original album release was in December 1966 on Columbia (EMI) SCX 6079.

The album was first released on compact disc in 1992 together with the Cinderella (pantomime cast album) by EMI Records.

A digitally remastered version of the album was released on compact disc in 2005 by EMI Records.
