= Don't Stop Me Now! =

1967 studio album by Cliff Richard

Studio album by Cliff Richard
- Released: April 1967
- Recorded: September 1966 – February 1967
- Studio: EMI Abbey Road
- Genre: Pop, Rock
- Label: Columbia - SCX 6133
- Producer: Norrie Paramor

Cliff Richard chronology
Cinderella (1967)	Don't Stop Me Now! (1967)	Two a Penny (1968)

Don't Stop Me Now! is the eleventh studio album by Cliff Richard, released in 1967. It is his twentieth album overall. The album was arranged and conducted by Mike Leander.

With this album, Richard made a "deep and serious thrust at establishing his mainstream pop/rock credentials" according to Bruce Eder of AllMusic. The album is made up of a mix of covers of rock 'n' roll standards and pop songs of the time, with what Eder describes as "brass and chorus-heavy arrangements".

The album reached number 23 in the UK Album Charts in a 9 week run in the top 40.

== Track listing ==
1. "Shout" (O'Kelly Isley, Jr., Rudolph Isley, Ronald Isley)
2. "One Fine Day" (Carole King, Gerry Goffin)
3. "I'll Be Back" (John Lennon, Paul McCartney)
4. "Heartbeat" (Bob Montgomery, Norman Petty)
5. "I Saw Her Standing There" (Lennon, McCartney)
6. "Hang On to a Dream" (Tim Hardin)
7. "You Gotta Tell Me" with Bruce Welch and Hank Marvin^{[A]} (Roy Williams)
8. "Homeward Bound" (Paul Simon)
9. "Good Golly Miss Molly" (John Marascalco, Robert "Bumps" Blackwell)
10. "Don't Make Promises" (Tim Hardin)
11. "Move It" (re-recording) (Ian Samwell)
12. "Don't" (Jerry Leiber, Mike Stoller)
13. "Dizzy Miss Lizzy" (Larry Williams)
14. "Baby It's You" (Burt Bacharach, Mack David, Barney Williams a.k.a. Luther Dixon)
15. "My Babe" (Willie Dixon)
16. "Save the Last Dance for Me" (Leiber, Stoller)
Notes:
- A backing vocals

== Personnel ==
Taken from the sleeve notes, although they provide only scant details, as follows:

- Cliff Richard - lead vocals
- Bruce Welch - backing vocals on "You Gotta Tell Me"
- Hank Marvin - backing vocals on "You Gotta Tell Me"
- Mike Leander - arranger and conductor
- Norrie Paramor - producer
