= Cliff Richard (1965 album) =

1965 studio album by Cliff Richard

Studio album by Cliff Richard
- Released: April 1965
- Recorded: Jul-Aug 1964; Nov 1963; May, Jul, Dec 1962 at EMI Studios, Barcelona; EMI Studios, London; CBS 30th Street Studio, New York City; CBS Studios, Nashville
- Genre: Pop, easy listening, MOR
- Label: Columbia Records
- Producer: Norrie Paramor

Cliff Richard chronology
Aladdin and His Wonderful Lamp (1964)	Cliff Richard (1965)	When in Rome (1965)

Professional ratings
Review scores
Source	Rating
Record Mirror	5/5 stars

Cliff Richard is the seventh studio album by Cliff Richard, released by Columbia Records on LP in 1965 and available in both mono and stereo. It is Richard's thirteenth album overall. The album peaked at number 9 in the UK Albums Chart.

In some regions outside the UK, "Angel" was released as a single. It reached number 6 in Australia and number 14 in Belgium.

== Track listing ==
1. "Angel"
2. "Sway" (with The Shadows)
3. "I Only Came to Say Goodbye" (with The Norrie Paramor Orchestra)
4. "Take Special Care" (with The Shadows, The Norrie Paramor Orchestra and The Mike Sammes Singers)
5. "Magic Is the Moonlight" (with The Shadows)
6. "House Without Windows" (with The Norrie Paramor Orchestra and The Mike Sammes Singers)
7. "Razzle Dazzle" (Charles Calhoun) (with The Shadows)
8. "I Don't Wanna Love you" (B. Mann - C. Weil)
9. "It's Not for Me to Say" (with The Norrie Paramor Orchestra and The Mike Sammes Singers)
10. "You Belong to My Heart" (with The Shadows)
11. "Again"
12. "Perfidia" (with The Shadows)
13. "Kiss" (with The Shadows, The Norrie Paramor Orchestra and The Mike Sammes Singers)
14. "Reelin' And Rockin'" (with The Shadows)

== Personnel ==
- Hank Marvin - lead guitar
- Bruce Welch - rhythm guitar
- Brian Bennett - drums
- Brian Locking - bass guitar
- The Norrie Paramor Orchestra - strings
- The Mike Sammes Singers - backing vocals
- The Jordanaires - backing vocals (on "Again")

== Releases ==
The album was first released in April 1965.

The album was repackaged as a budget album in 1970 and re-titled All My Love. It added the track "All My Love (Solo Tu)" and dropped "Angel" and "Kiss".
