= Angel (Elvis Presley song) =

1962 song by Elvis Presley

Song by Elvis Presley

from the EP Follow That Dream
- Released: April 1962
- Recorded: July 2, 1961
- Studio: RCA Studio B, Nashville, Tennessee
- Genre: Pop
- Length: 2:39
- Label: RCA Victor
- Songwriter(s): Sid Tepper; Roy C. Bennett
- Producer(s): Hans Salter

"Angel" is a song by Elvis Presley from the film Follow That Dream and was released on the soundtrack EP of the same name in April 1962.

== Recording ==
"Angel" was recorded at RCA Studio B in Nashville, Tennessee, and it took seven takes to record the final version. It was released as a single; however, this was only in South Africa and Rhodesia in February 1965.

== Cliff Richard version ==
"Angel"
- Cover of the single released in the Netherlands

Single by Cliff Richard

from the album Cliff Richard
- B-side: "Razzle Dazzle"
- Released: May 1965
- Recorded: 24 August 1964
- Studio: Columbia Studios, Nashville, Tennessee
- Genre: Pop
- Length: 2:22
- Label: Columbia
- Songwriter(s): Sid Tepper; Roy C. Bennett
- Producer(s): Billy Sherrill; Bob Morgan

Cliff Richard singles chronology
"The Minute You're Gone" (1965)	"Angel" (1965)	"On My Word" (1965)

In 1965, Cliff Richard released a cover of the song on his eponymous seventh studio, which was also released as a single.

=== Release ===
"Angel" was pressed in the UK, though was released as an export-only single. It was released in Australia and most of Europe with the B-side "Razzle Dazzle", written by Charles Calhoun and first released by Bill Haley & His Comets in 1955. In Germany, "Angel" was released with the B-side "House Without Windows", written by Fred Tobias and Lee Pockriss and first released by Steve Lawrence in 1962. The song was officially released in the UK as the title track to an EP in September 1965.

=== Track listing ===
7"

1. "Angel" – 2:22
2. "Razzle Dazzle" – 2:04

7" (Germany)

1. "Angel" – 2:22
2. "House Without Windows" – 2:29

7" (Japan)

1. "Angel" – 2:22
2. "Again" – 2:34

EP

1. "Angel" – 2:22
2. "I Only Came to Say Goodbye" – 2:26
3. "On My Word" – 2:30
4. "The Minute You're Gone" – 2:43

=== Charts ===
Chart (1965)	Peak position
Australia (Kent Music Report)	6
Belgium (Ultratop 50 Flanders)	14
Belgium (Ultratop 50 Wallonia)	16
Hong Kong	7
Malaysia	8
Netherlands (Dutch Top 40)	40
