= The Rise and Fall of Flingel Bunt =

1964 single by the Shadows

Single by The Shadows
- B-side: "It's a Man's World"
- Released: 1 May 1964
- Recorded: 25 February 1964
- Studio: EMI Studios, London
- Genre: Instrumental rock
- Length: 2:46
- Label: Columbia
- Songwriter(s): Hank Marvin; Bruce Welch; John Rostill; Brian Bennett

The Shadows singles chronology
"Theme for Young Lovers" (1964)	"The Rise and Fall of Flingel Bunt" (1964)	"Rhythm and Greens" (1963)

"The Rise and Fall of Flingel Bunt" is an instrumental by British group the Shadows. It peaked at number 5 in the UK Singles Chart.

== Release and reception ==
"The Rise and Fall of Flingel Bunt" was written by all members of the Shadows. Flingel Bunt is an imaginary character invented by the actor Richard O'Sullivan, a friend of the Shadows. The full title was given to the tune after the group had been to see the film The Rise and Fall of Legs Diamond. It was released with the B-side "It's a Man's World", written by Malcolm Addey and Norman Smith.

Reviewed in Record Mirror, it was described as being "completely different from all the Shads' previous ones". "Good beat and it has plenty of blues' feeling, plus an air of earthiness". For Disc, Don Nicholl wrote that "the actual instrumental itself is a steady, fairly dramatic production with thudding drumwork persisting behind the guitars".

== Track listing ==
7": Columbia / DB 7261

1. "The Rise and Fall of Flingel Bunt" – 2:46
2. "It's a Man's World" – 2:03

== Personnel ==
- Hank Marvin – electric lead guitar
- Bruce Welch – acoustic rhythm guitar
- John Rostill – electric bass guitar
- Brian Bennett – drums
- Norrie Paramor – piano

== Charts ==
Chart (1964)	Peak position
Australia (Kent Music Report)	5
Canada (Vancouver CFUN)	2
Denmark (Danmarks Radio)	12
New Zealand (Lever Hit Parade)	4
South Africa	4
Sweden (Kvällstoppen)	13
UK Singles (OCC)	5

== Covers ==
- The song was covered by the Raybeats on their 1981 debut EP Roping Wild Bears.
- It was covered by Hank Marvin in the 1996 collection Twang!: A Tribute to Hank Marvin & the Shadows.
- It was also covered by American bluesman Albert Castiglia on his 2006 album, A Stone's Throw.
