= Aladdin and His Wonderful Lamp (Cliff Richard and the Shadows album) =

1964 pantomime cast album by Cliff Richard and the Shadows

Cast recording by Cliff Richard and the Shadows
- Released: December 1964
- Recorded: 15–17, 21 October 1964
- Studio: EMI Abbey Road
- Genre: Pop, pantomime
- Label: Columbia - SCX 3522
- Producer: Norrie Paramor

Cliff Richard chronology
Wonderful Life (1964)	Aladdin and His Wonderful Lamp (1964)	Cliff Richard (1965)

Singles from Aladdin and His Wonderful Lamp
- 1. "Genie with the Light Brown Lamp" Released: December 1964; 2. "I Could Easily Fall (In Love with You)" Released: December 1964

Aladdin and His Wonderful Lamp is a 1964 pantomime cast album by Cliff Richard, the Shadows, the Norrie Paramor orchestra and other members of the pantomime cast. It is Richard's twelfth album. The album reached number 13 in the UK Album Charts in a 5-week run in the top 20.

Two singles were released from the album within a week of each other in December 1964. First, the Shadows' "Genie with the Light Brown Lamp", which reached number 17 in the UK Singles Chart, followed by Richard's "I Could Easily Fall (In Love with You)" (with the Shadows backing), reaching number 6 on the same chart.

== Track listing ==
1. "Emperor Theme"/"Chinese Street Scene" - Norrie Paramor and his Orchestra
2. "Me Oh My" - The Shadows
3. "I Could Easily Fall (In Love with You)" - Cliff Richard and The Shadows
4. "Little Princess" - The Shadows
5. "This was My Special Day" - Faye Fisher, Joan Palethorpe, Audrey Bayley, Cliff Richard, Norrie Paramor and his Orchestra
6. "I'm in Love With You" - Cliff Richard and The Shadows, Norrie Paramor and his Orchestra
7. "There's Gotta Be a Way" - Cliff Richard, Norrie Paramor and his Orchestra
8. "Ballet" - Norrie Paramor and his Orchestra
9. "Dance of the Warriors" - Norrie Paramor and his Orchestra
10. "Friends" - Cliff Richard and The Shadows, Norrie Paramor and his Orchestra
11. "Dragon Dance" - Norrie Paramor and his Orchestra
12. "Genie with the Light Brown Lamp" - The Shadows
13. "Make Ev'ry Day a Carnival Day" - Cliff Richard, Norrie Paramor and his Orchestra
14. "Widow Twanky's Song" - Michael Samms, Charles Granville, Norrie Paramor And His Orchestra
15. "I'm Feeling Oh So Lonely" - Faye Fisher, Joan Palethorpe, Audrey Bayley, Norrie Paramor and his Orchestra
16. "I've Said Too Many Things" - Cliff Richard and The Shadows, Norrie Paramor and his Orchestra
17. "Evening Comes" - Cliff Richard and The Shadows, Norrie Paramor And his Orchestra
18. "Havin' Fun" - Cliff Richard and The Shadows

== Personnel ==
Taken from the sleeve notes:

- Cliff Richard - Lead vocals
- Norrie Paramor - producer, arranger and conductor
- Norrie Paramor orchestra
- Faye Fisher - vocals
- Joan Palethorpe - vocals
- Audrey Bayley - vocals
- Mike Sammes Singers - backing vocals

The Shadows:

- Hank Marvin - lead guitar, backing vocals
- Bruce Welch - rhythm guitar, backing vocals
- John Rostill - bass guitar
- Brian Bennett - drums

Music and lyrics by the Shadows.
