= Rhythm & Greens =

EP by The Shadows
- Released: September 1964
- Studio: EMI, London
- Label: Columbia
- Producer: Norrie Paramor

Rhythm & Greens is an extended play record released by The Shadows in September 1964. It served as the soundtrack to the short film of the same name produced and directed by Christopher Miles. The film, which features narration by Robert Morley in place of dialogue, was the Shadows' first major acting project without Cliff Richard. The EP reached number 8 on the British EP charts and stayed on the chart for 14 weeks.

The title track, named in parody of the British rhythm and blues scene, was issued as a single in advance of the EP and peaked at number 22 on the UK Singles Chart. Speaking in 1964, Bruce Welch said the track, recorded in one take, was "a mickey-take of what the new groups are playing", while Hank Marvin said the track featured no melody line.

An anonymous writer for the Rugeley Times considered the title track to contain "all that it takes these days to make a hit - maracas, a thumping bass guitar, plenty of screaming and shouting and strident guitar playing". An anonymous writer for Record Mirror considered the track "a bit like a Mersey group gone wrong, and certainly not like the Shadows".

== Track listing ==
Side 1

- Rhythm & Greens (Marvin-Welch-Bennett-Rostill)
- Ranka-Chank (Marvin-Welch-Bennett-Rostill)

Side 2

- Main Theme (Marvin-Welch-Bennett-Rostill)
- The Drum Number (Marvin-Welch-Bennett-Rostill)
- The Lute Number (Marvin-Welch-Bennett-Rostill)

== Personnel ==
- Hank Marvin – lead guitar
- Bruce Welch – rhythm guitar
- John Rostill – bass guitar
- Brian Bennett – drums
- Norrie Paramor – producer
