= In the Country (song) =

1966 single by Cliff Richard and the Shadows

- Cover of the single released in the Netherlands

Single by Cliff Richard and the Shadows

from the album Cinderella
- B-side: "Finders Keepers"
- Released: 2 December 1966
- Recorded: 16 November 1966
- Studio: EMI Studios, London
- Genre: Pop; beat
- Length: 2:38
- Label: Columbia
- Songwriters: Hank Marvin; Bruce Welch; Brian Bennett; John Rostill
- Producer: Norrie Paramor

Cliff Richard and the Shadows singles chronology
"Time Drags By" (1966)	"In the Country" (1966)	"It's All Over" (1967)

"In the Country" is a song by Cliff Richard and the Shadows, released as a single in December 1966. It peaked at number 6 on the UK Singles Chart.

== Release and reception ==
"In the Country" was written by all four members of the Shadows and was included on the pantomime cast album Cinderella. The single was released with the B-side "Finders Keepers", which was the title track from the group's previous soundtrack album.

Reviewed in Disc, "In the Country" was described as "so hideously catchy everyone will be bouncing off the walls to it, whether they want to or not". Peter Jones for Record Mirror wrote that it was "a very strong song" with "the Shads contributing the vocal wordlessness behind Cliff, who fair swings through a rather typical show tune. Has strong grow-on-you appeal".

== Track listing ==
1. "In the Country" – 2:38
2. "Finders Keepers" – 2:36

== Personnel ==
- Cliff Richard – vocals
- Hank Marvin – lead guitar, backing vocals
- Bruce Welch – rhythm guitar, backing vocals
- John Rostill – bass guitar, backing vocals
- Brian Bennett – drums

== Charts ==
Chart (1967)	Peak position
Australia (Go-Set)	8
Australia (Kent Music Report)	10
Denmark (Danmarks Radio)	12
Germany (GfK)	35
Ireland (IRMA)	10
Malaysia (Radio Malaysia)	3
Netherlands (Dutch Top 40)	12
Netherlands (Single Top 100)	14
New Zealand (Listener)	3
Norway (VG-lista)	7
Sweden (Sverigetopplistan)	12
UK Singles (OCC)	6

== Cover versions ==
British indie-pop band The Farmer's Boys had a minor UK hit with a cover version of "In the Country" in the summer of 1984.
