= Theme for Young Lovers =

1964 single by the Shadows

- Cover of the single released in Sweden

Single by The Shadows

from the album Wonderful Life
- B-side: "This Hammer"
- Released: 28 February 1964
- Recorded: 1 November 1963
- Studio: EMI Studios, London
- Genre: Instrumental rock
- Length: 2:38
- Label: Columbia
- Songwriter: Bruce Welch
- Producer: Norrie Paramor

The Shadows singles chronology
"Geronimo" (1963)	"Theme for Young Lovers" (1964)	"The Rise and Fall of Flingel Bunt" (1964)

"Theme for Young Lovers" is an instrumental by British group the Shadows, released as a single in February 1964. It peaked at number 12 on the UK Singles Chart.

== Release and reception ==
Despite being written by the Shadows' Bruce Welch, he does not actually feature on the recording as he was not in the studio during the recording session. Instead, his part, the acoustic rhythm guitar, was played by Hank Marvin. It was also the last Shadows recording to feature bassist Brian Locking, who left the group before the release of their previous single "Geronimo", being replaced by John Rostill. It was the lead single from the film Wonderful Life, featuring Cliff Richard, and was included on the soundtrack album by Richard and the Shadows. The B-side "This Hammer" is a traditional song, originally titled "Take This Hammer" and was arranged by the Shadows.

Reviewed in Record Mirror, "Theme for Young Lovers" was described as an "easy on the ear treatment of a number from the film "Wonderful Life". It's a delicate sounding slower-than-usual number which should give them a pretty big hit once more". For Disc, Don Nicholl wrote that "at first hearing, the line appears simple enough with roots, perhaps, in an old Scottish folk item. But I find it takes a few spins before you're able to remember it properly. It's a soothing guitar special".

== Track listing ==
7": Columbia / DB 7231

1. "Theme for Young Lovers" – 2:38
2. "This Hammer" – 2:68

7": Atlantic / 45-2235 (US)

1. "Theme for Young Lovers" – 2:41
2. "The Rise and Fall of Flingel Bunt" – 2:42

== Personnel ==
- Hank Marvin – electric lead guitar, acoustic rhythm guitar
- Brian "Licorice" Locking – electric bass guitar
- Brian Bennett – drums, tom-toms

== Charts ==
Chart (1964)	Peak position
Australia (Kent Music Report)	19
Netherlands (Single Top 100)	35
Sweden (Kvällstoppen)	18
UK Singles (OCC)	12

== Versions ==
- "Ich werde dich lieben" by Marlene Dietrich (1965, album Die neue Marlene).
