= Linnea Sinclair =

American novelist

- Born: 1954 (age 71–72); New Jersey, United States
- Education: Indiana University Bloomington; Florida State University
- Occupation: Writer
- Writing career
- Pen name: Megan Sybil Baker
- Genres: Science Fiction Romance, Paranormal romance, Fantasy romance
- Notable works: Gabriel's Ghost and sequels
- Notable awards: P.E.A.R.L. Award (2007); RITA Award (2006); EPPIE Award (2003); Sapphire Award (2001)
- Website: www.linneasinclair.com

Linnea Sinclair (born 1954 in New Jersey, United States) is an American writer of science fiction romance, fantasy romance and paranormal romance. Sinclair's Gabriel's Ghost was the winner of the 2006 RITA Award in the Best Paranormal Romance category. She has used the pseudonym Megan Sybil Baker. Formerly, she has been a news reporter and a private detective.

== Personal life and early career ==
Linnea Sinclair was born in New Jersey, USA. She studied journalism and criminology at Indiana University Bloomington (1972–1975) and Florida State University.

Sinclair is a former investigative news reporter and private investigator in the Central Florida area who has written for many private investigative journals. She owned Island Investigations.

Her first professional sale was the fantasy romance Wintertide in 1999 to LTDBooks. Since 2004 she has been published by Bantam Books.

== Writing career ==
While she was still a practicing PI and publishing with LTDBooks, she used the pen name Megan Sybil Baker.

She wrote Finders Keepers and Destiny's Game. She sometimes writes with a good sense of humor, and her books Finders Keepers and An Accidental Goddess have been called "funny". In a review of Gabriel's Ghost, Vicky Burkholder wrote that "Linnea blends science fiction, romance, world building and the paranormal".

Sinclair has used her experience as a private investigator in her work. The male protagonist in her novel The Down Home Zombie Blues is a homicide detective in a Florida city. Various of her short stories are based on a psychic investigator.

Sinclair's novel Games of Command and the short story Of Cats, Uh, Furzels and Kings feature telepathic feline creatures called "furzels". Sinclair has stated that these are inspired by her two cats.

Sinclair's novel The Down Home Zombie Blues was the basis for the movie The Down Home Alien Blues by director C. Duke Marsh and Green Sign Media. Principal photography was completed in March 2012. The movie stars Nathalie Biermans, Jay Mitsch, and Derek Partridge. Release date was set for 2013.

== Published works ==
=== Wintertide series ===
- Wintertide (1999, LTDBooks, as Megan Sybil Baker; June 2004, Medallion Press)
- An Accidental Goddess (October 2002, LTDBooks, as Megan Sybil Baker; January 2006, Bantam Books)

the far future sequel to Wintertide

=== Dock Five Universe series ===
- Gabriel's Ghost (April 2002, LTDBooks, as Megan Sybil Baker; October 2005, Bantam Books.) 2006 RITA Award winner, for Best Paranormal Romance
- Shades of Dark previously called Chasidah's Choice (July 2008, Bantam Books.) 2008 P.E.A.R.L. Award, for Best Science Fiction/Fantasy Romance.
- Hope's Folly (February 24, 2009, Bantam Books.) 2009 P.E.A.R.L. Award, for Best Science Fiction & Futuristic Fantasy Romance
- Rebels and Lovers (March 2010, Bantam Books.)

=== Standalone novels ===
- Finders Keepers (October 2001, Novel Books Inc.; May 2005, Bantam Books) 2001 Sapphire Award; 2003 EPPIE Award, for Fantasy/Science Fiction/Paranormal Romance
- Command Performance (April 2002, Novel Books Inc.)
- Destiny's Game (November 2002, Novel Books Inc.)
- Games of Command (February 2007, Bantam Books) 2007 P.E.A.R.L. Award, for Best Science Fiction/Fantasy Romance
- The Down Home Zombie Blues (November 2007, Bantam Books) 2007 P.E.A.R.L. Honorable Mention, for Best Futuristic Romance 2008 winner of Romantic Times 2008 Reviewers' Choice Award Winners for Futuristic/Fantasy Romance

=== Editor, with J.C. Wilder ===
- Dream Quest, Nine Spellbinding Paranormal Romances (January 2003, LTDBooks), including the short story "To Call the Moons" by Sinclair (as Megan Sybil Baker).
