= Finders Keepers? =

Book by Robert Arnett

- Cover of Finders Keepers?
- Author: Robert Arnett
- Illustrator: Smita Turakhia
- Cover artist: Smita Turakhia
- Language: English
- Publisher: Atman Press
- Publication date: 15 October 2003
- Publication place: United States
- Pages: 32
- ISBN: 0-9652900-2-6
- OCLC: 53842130

Finders Keepers? is a children's book set in India. It is the true story about a boy who finds the author's wallet and does not understand why he should be rewarded for returning the wallet to its proper owner. The first book in the India Unveiled Children's Series, written by Robert Arnett and illustrated by Smita Turakhia, has won multiple awards, including the National Parenting Center's Seal of Approval and the Benjamin Franklin Silver Award for Best Multicultural Book of the Year.

== Awards ==
- Independent Publisher Book Awards: Ten Outstanding Books of the Year
- Most Inspirational to Youth Book Award
- Benjamin Franklin Silver Award for Best Multicultural Book of the Year

== See also ==
Official Site
