= The Minute You're Gone =

- Cover of the single released in the Netherlands

Single by Cliff Richard
- B-side: "Just Another Guy"
- Released: 5 March 1965
- Recorded: 25 August 1964
- Studio: Columbia (Nashville, Tennessee)
- Genre: Pop
- Length: 2:19
- Songwriter: Jimmy Gateley
- Producers: Billy Sherrill, Bob Morgan

Cliff Richard singles chronology
"I Could Easily Fall (in Love with You)" (1964)	"The Minute You're Gone" (1965)	"Angel" (1965)

"The Minute You're Gone" is a song written by Jimmy Gateley (often miscredited as "Gately" or "Gatelie"), a Nashville, Tennessee based fiddle player and singer, for Sonny James in 1963. This song originally made No. 95 in the US charts and No. 9 in the country charts for Sonny James in 1963.

Cliff Richard recorded it in 1964 and his single spent a week at number one in the UK Singles Chart in April 1965.

It was also recorded by Al Martino, Faron Young and Loretta Lynn.

== Cliff Richard version ==
Richard's recording of the song had come about with the involvement of Richard's American label Epic Records, which wanted to present Richard in the US with more American songs. Bob Morgan, executive A&R producer from Epic met with Richard's A&R producer Norrie Paramor and Richard to map out recording plans and brought 50 songs of US origin for them to screen. About 15 songs were selected and plans were made to record in New York, Nashville and Chicago according to the different styles of the songs selected, which ranged from pop-country, pure country, ballad and medium tempo. In Nashville, Richard recorded the singles "The Minute You're Gone", "Wind Me Up (Let Me Go)" and "On My Word" with Billy Sherrill producing with backing by Nashville session musicians together with the Anita Kerr Singers. Arrangement and conducting on "The Minute You're Gone" was by Stan Applebaum.

"The Minute You're Gone" provided Richard with his eighth UK number one single. It was also his first UK chart topper he had recorded without The Shadows backing. However, at the corresponding time in the US, Epic chose to release the soft ballad "Again" (another of his Nashville recorded tracks) as a single with "The Minute You're Gone" as the B-side. Although "Again" received a 4 star rating from Billboard, it had no chart success.

Meanwhile, "The Minute You're Gone" became another international hit for Richard outside the Americas.

=== Chart performance ===
Chart (1965–1966)	Peak position
UK Singles (Official Charts)	1
Australia (Kent Music Report)	6
Hong Kong	2
Ireland (IRMA)	2
Netherlands (Single Top 100)	21
Malaysia	1
Norway (VG-lista)	6
Singapore	1
South Africa	8^{[A]}
Sweden (Sverigetopplistan)	19
US Record World Singles Coming Up	112

Notes:
- A Chart position is taken from the first week of the South Africa "SA Top 20 Charts". The single was available prior to the period of the first chart and so may have charted higher if the chart had existed at the time. Billboard unfortunately did not publish all their South Africa charts in the weeks around this time.
