= Wonderful Life (1964 film) =

British musical by Sidney J. Furie

- DVD cover
- Directed by: Sidney J. Furie
- Written by: Peter Myers and Ronald Cass
- Produced by: Kenneth Harper
- Starring: Cliff Richard; Walter Slezak; Susan Hampshire; The Shadows
- Cinematography: Kenneth Higgins
- Edited by: Jack Slade
- Music by: Stanley Black
- Production companies: Associated British Picture Corporation; Elstree Distributors; Ivy Productions
- Distributed by: Warner-Pathé (UK); American International Pictures (US)
- Release date: 2 July 1964 (London)
- Running time: 113 minutes (U.K.); 83 minutes (U.S.)
- Country: United Kingdom
- Language: English
- Budget: £750,000

Wonderful Life (U.S.: Swingers' Paradise) is a 1964 British film directed by Sidney J. Furie and starring Cliff Richard, Walter Slezak, Susan Hampshire and the Shadows. It is the third in a series of film musicals starring Richard following The Young Ones (1961) and Summer Holiday (1963). It was written by Peter Myers and Ronald Cass, and choreographed by Gillian Lynne.

== Plot ==
Jonnie and his bandmates work as waiters on a travelling ferry. Through a pyrotechnics accident, the power on the ferry cuts off and the group are fired on the spot, stranded on a tiny boat with nothing but their instruments. They float around in the Atlantic Ocean until they reach the Canary Islands.

The group ends up in a sand dune, miserable and confused, wondering what to do next. They are briefly confused by a mirage of a ferry but then decide to set off again in the direction they were originally heading. Jonnie spots a figure on an out-of-control camel and rushes to save her, but discovers that he had accidentally ruined a scene being filmed for a movie. Despite the disruption, director Lloyd Davis offers him a job as a stunt double and gives the rest of Jonnie's group jobs as runners.

Later that evening, Jonnie spots a blonde woman sitting at his opposite table reading from a script. Her name is Jenny and she doesn't believe that she is a good enough actress to be the leading lady. Jonnie tells her to ignore the cameras and the crew watching her, and imagine that she isn't acting. The advice does not help her and Lloyd regrets hiring her.

Jonnie's band realise they could cheer everyone up by making the movie a musical, disguising their spare camera behind various objects. The group race through the filming under Lloyd and Jenny's noses, filming a musical number by telling Jenny to sing her script along with the music secretly played by Jonnie's band hiding behind a wall. They are caught by an eavesdropping Lloyd who threatens to fire them, but Jonnie convinces him not to. Lloyd smugly tells him that he will allow them to continue but not with any of his equipment. Jonnie and his friends decide to film when the actual team is not around to witness, and borrow a camera, but worry about filming the finale without Jenny's knowledge. In a restaurant, they discuss their plans and make jokes at Lloyd's expense, unaware that Lloyd and Jenny are on an adjacent table. Lloyd, who is revealed as Jenny's father, vows to stop them and orders Jenny not to go on set the next day.

Jonnie finds Jenny at the nearest swimming pool and begs her to help them. She agrees, snapping that she never wants to see him again. When filming is over, Lloyd is disappointed that his final cut for the film isn't up to his standard and Jonnie isn't happy about the musical adaptation either. They decide to join forces and combine their movies, rewriting the tale as a story about two brothers and a princess. It is shown at the movie premiere and the audience's reception is positive. Lloyd expresses his gratitude to Jonnie during the applause and tells him that Jenny wants to marry him.

== Cast ==
- Cliff Richard as Johnnie
- Walter Slezak as Lloyd Davis
- Susan Hampshire as Jenny Taylor
- Hank Marvin as Hank (The Shadows)
- Bruce Welch as Bruce (The Shadows)
- Brian Bennett as Brian (The Shadows)
- John Rostill as John (The Shadows)
- Melvyn Hayes as Jerry
- Richard O'Sullivan as Edward
- Una Stubbs as Barbara Tate the screenwriter
- Derek Bond as Douglas Leslie
- Gerald Harper as Sheik / Scotsman / Harold
- Joseph Cuby as Miguel (credited as Joe Cuby)

== Production ==
The film was made in Techniscope. Locations scenes were shot on Gran Canaria in the Canary Islands. These included the port and town of Las Palmas. The "desert" scenes were done at the Maspalomas Dunes.

== Music ==
The soundtrack was released by Cliff Richard with The Shadows as the 1964 album Wonderful Life.

== Release ==
Wonderful Life was among the ten most popular films of the year at the British box office in 1964 according to Kinematograph Weekly. However, compared to the first two Cliff Richard's musicals (The Young Ones (1961) and Summer Holiday (1963) ) this film was considered a box office disappointment. The singer said it took seven years for the movie to go into profit.

== Reception ==
The Monthly Film Bulletin wrote: "Saddled with a more than usually imbecilic story, Sidney Furie has still managed to make a likeably bouncy, if not very good film. ... The humour ... is depressingly unfunny; and the musical numbers, with choreography patterned some way after West Side Story, are robbed of most of their effect by the fact that they are danced by non-dancing principals, while the real dancers are kept as a background chorus. On the credit side, however, are a genial performance by Walter Slezak, the likeable Cliff Richard, a lively twist number on the beach involving the entire film unit, and especially a lengthy 'potted history of the movies' ... Like Summer Holiday, in fact, Wonderful Life has more good intentions than accomplishments, but it is kept going by Sidney Furie's amiable, unpretentious drive"

== See also ==
- Wonderful Life (Cliff Richard album)
