= Summer Holiday (song) =

1963 single by Cliff Richard and the Shadows

Single by Cliff Richard, The Shadows and the Norrie Paramor Strings

from the album Summer Holiday
- B-side: "Dancing Shoes"
- Released: 15 February 1963
- Recorded: 9 May & 19 November 1962
- Studio: EMI Studios, London
- Genre: Pop
- Length: 2:03
- Label: Columbia DB 4977
- Songwriters: Bruce Welch; Brian Bennett
- Producer: Norrie Paramor

Cliff Richard, The Shadows and the Norrie Paramor Strings singles chronology
""The Next Time" / "Bachelor Boy"" (1962)	"Summer Holiday" (1963)	"Lucky Lips" (1963)

Audio sample
- file; help

"Summer Holiday" is a song recorded by Cliff Richard and the Shadows, written by rhythm guitarist Bruce Welch and drummer Brian Bennett. It is taken from the film of the same name, and was released as the second single from the film in February 1963. It went to number one in the UK Singles Chart for a total of two weeks. After that, the Shadows' instrumental "Foot Tapper"—also from the same film—took over the top spot for one week, before "Summer Holiday" returned to the top spot for one further week.

"Summer Holiday" is one of Richard's best known titles and it remains a staple of his live shows. It was one of six songs that Richard performed at his spontaneous gig at the 1996 Wimbledon Championships when rain stopped the tennis.

== Notable covers and parodies ==
- Dutch rap duo MC Miker G & DJ Sven expanded on the song in 1986 with "Holiday Rap".
- The song was first parodied in 2006 as "Cowboy Holiday" for the Bob the Builder movie, Built to be Wild.
- In 2019, the UK Government's Drinkaware campaign parodied "Summer Holiday" for a string of radio adverts and videos for the "No Alcoholiday" initiative to encourage people to have drink-free days.

== Chart performance ==
=== Summer Holiday ===
Chart (1963)	Peak position
Australia (Kent Music Report)	3
Australia (Music Maker, Sydney)	1
Belgium (Ultratop 50 Flanders)	5
Belgium (Ultratop 50 Wallonia)	18
Canada (CHUM)	1
Denmark (Quan Musikbureau)	1
Finland (IFPI Finland)	6
France (SNEP)	46
Hong Kong	2
Ireland (IRMA)	2
Israel (Kol)	2
Netherlands (Single Top 100)	2
New Zealand	2^{[*]}
Norway (VG-lista)	1
Spain (Promusicae)	1
South Africa (SARMDA)	10
UK Singles (Official Charts)	1

Notes:

- * Not all New Zealand chart weeks were published in Billboard. The record may have charted higher.

=== Dancing Shoes ===
The B-side "Dancing Shoes" also entered some charts, some of which are listed below.

Chart (1963)	Peak position
Hong Kong	6
South Africa (SARMDA)	4
UK (NME)	25
