= I Could Easily Fall (in Love with You) =

1964 single by Cliff Richard and the Shadows

- Cover of the single released in the Netherlands

Single by Cliff Richard and the Shadows

from the album Aladdin and His Wonderful Lamp
- B-side: "I'm in Love with You"
- Released: 27 November 1964
- Recorded: 15 October 1964
- Studio: EMI Studios, London
- Genre: Pop rock; rock and roll
- Length: 2:54
- Label: Columbia
- Songwriters: Hank Marvin; Bruce Welch; Brian Bennett; John Rostill
- Producer: Norrie Paramor

Cliff Richard and the Shadows singles chronology
"The Twelfth of Never" (1964)	"I Could Easily Fall (in Love with You)" (1964)	"The Minute You're Gone" (1965)

"I Could Easily Fall (in Love with You)" is a song by Cliff Richard and the Shadows, released as a single in November 1964 from their album Aladdin and His Wonderful Lamp. It peaked at number 6 on the UK Singles Chart and received a silver disc for 250,000 sales.

== Release ==
"I Could Easily Fall (in Love with You)" was written by all four members of the Shadows, who had been commissioned to write the score for the 1964 London pantomime Aladdin and His Wonderful Lamp. "I Could Easily Fall (in Love with You)" was the lead single from the show and album and was backed by another song from the album, "I'm in Love with You", which featured the Norrie Paramor Strings and backing vocals by the Mike Sammes Singers.

In May 1965, Richard released a German-language version of "I Could Easily Fall (in Love with You), titled "Es war keine so wunderbar wie du", with the B-side being a German-language version of "The Minute You're Gone", titled "Es könnte schon morgen sein".

== Track listing ==
7": Columbia / DB 7420

1. "I Could Easily Fall (in Love with You)" – 2:54
2. "I'm in Love with You" – 2:38

7": Columbia / C 22 962 (Germany)

1. "Es war keine so wunderbar wie du" – 2:56
2. "Es könnte schon morgen sein" – 2:12

== Personnel ==
- Cliff Richard – vocals
- Hank Marvin – lead guitar, backing vocals
- Bruce Welch – rhythm guitar, backing vocals
- John Rostill – bass guitar
- Brian Bennett – drums

== Charts ==
Chart (1964–65)	Peak position
Australia (Kent Music Report)	9
Austria (Ö3 Austria Top 40)	8
Belgium (Ultratop 50 Flanders)	17
Belgium (Ultratop 50 Wallonia)	47
Canada Top Singles (RPM)	40
Canada (CHUM)	21
Finland (Suomen virallinen lista)	5
Hong Kong	2
Ireland (IRMA)	8
Malaysia	1
Netherlands (Single Top 100)	3
Norway (VG-lista)	3
Rhodesia (Lyons Maid)	1
Singapore	1
South Africa	1
Sweden (Sverigetopplistan)	6
UK Singles (Official Charts)	6

"Es war keine so wunderbar wie du"

Chart (1964)	Peak position
Austria (Podium)	13
Germany (GfK)	5
Switzerland	8

== Cover versions ==
- In 1965, French singer Sheila released a French-language version, titled "Toujours des beaux jours", as a single, which peaked at number 1 in France and number 10 in Wallonia.
- In 1965, Finnish singer Johnny released a Finnish-language version, titled "Rakastuin sinuun liian helposti", with the Sounds. It peaked at number 10 on the Finnish Singles Chart.
- In 1969, Swedish band Flamingokvintetten released a Swedish-language version, titled "Det är lätt att bli kär i nå'n som dig", on their album Chin Chin.
