= The Time in Between (song) =

1965 single by Cliff Richard and the Shadows

Single by Cliff Richard and the Shadows
- B-side: "Look Before You Love"
- Released: 13 August 1965
- Recorded: 10 May 1965
- Studio: Estúdios Valentim de Carvalho, Lisbon, Portugal
- Genre: Pop rock; beat
- Length: 2:58
- Label: Columbia
- Songwriter(s): Georges Aber; Micky Jones; Thomas Brown
- Producer(s): Norrie Paramor

Cliff Richard and the Shadows singles chronology
| "On My Word" (1965) | "The Time in Between" (1965) | "Wind Me Up (Let Me Go)" (1965) |

"The Time in Between" is a song by Cliff Richard and the Shadows, released as a single in August 1965. It peaked at number 22 on the UK Singles Chart.

== Release ==
Originally a French song, "The Time in Between" was written by Georges Aber, guitarist Micky Jones (later known for playing in rock band Foreigner) and drummer Thomas Brown. The Shadows were thinking of recording it by themselves, but "when Cliff heard it he was so enthusiastic about it that [they] passed it over to him". The song was recorded at the Estúdios Valentim de Carvalho whilst the group were in Portugal. It was released single with the B-side "Look Before You Love", written by Chris Arnold, David Martin and Geoff Morrow. Richard "was convinced ["The Time in Between"] was going to be a smash", saying "I think we did a really good job on the track. And yet it didn't get higher than 20 [on the UK Singles Chart]".

Reviewing for New Musical Express, Derek Johnson wrote: "It's medium fast, with Hank and Bruce providing a vocal harmony backing. It's a snappy number, full of life and buoyancy, and you've just got to keep moving to the beat. The melody content is both strong and appealing, while the Shads are in vital and vibrant form".

== Track listing ==
7": Columbia / DB 7660

1. "The Time in Between" – 2:58
2. "Look Before You Love" – 2:57

== Personnel ==
- Cliff Richard – vocals
- Hank Marvin – lead guitar, backing vocals
- Bruce Welch – rhythm guitar, backing vocals
- John Rostill – bass guitar
- Brian Bennett – drums
- Norrie Paramor – piano

== Charts ==
| Chart (1965) | Peak position |
|---|---|
| Australia (Kent Music Report) | 83 |
| Hong Kong | 9 |
| UK Singles (OCC) | 22 |
