= Finders Keepers (1966 film) =

British musical by Sidney Hayers

- Directed by: Sidney Hayers
- Written by: Michael Pertwee
- Produced by: George H. Brown
- Starring: Cliff Richard; The Shadows; Robert Morley; Peggy Mount
- Cinematography: Alan Hume
- Edited by: Tristam Cones
- Music by: Bernard Ebbinghouse
- Distributed by: United Artists
- Release date: 8 December 1966 (London)
- Running time: 94 minutes
- Country: United Kingdom
- Language: English

Finders Keepers is a 1966 British musical film directed by Sidney Hayers, written by Michael Pertwee and starring Cliff Richard and The Shadows. It was released in the U.S. the following year.

The film's tagline is 'The beat is the wildest! The blast is the craziest! ... and the fun is where you find it!'

== Plot ==
Cliff and The Shadows travel to a Spanish town for a gig. When they arrive they are puzzled to find the area empty. They find out that a small bomb has accidentally been dropped on the town and the villagers have fled in panic that it will go off. The boys decide to find the bomb and restore peace in the village, with some musical numbers along the way.

== Cast ==
- Cliff Richard as Cliff
- Hank Marvin as himself (as The Shadows)
- Bruce Welch as himself (as The Shadows)
- Brian Bennett as himself (as The Shadows)
- John Rostill as himself (as The Shadows)
- Robert Morley as Colonel Roberts
- Viviane Ventura as Emilia
- Peggy Mount as Mrs. Bragg
- Graham Stark as Burke
- John Le Mesurier as Mr. X
- Ellen Pollock as grandma
- Ernest Clark as Air Marshal
- Burnell Tucker as pilot
- George Roderick as priest
- Bill Mitchell as G.I. Guard
- Robert Hutton as Commander

== Production ==
The story is loosely based on a real accident on 17 January 1966, when a US B-52 strategic bomber, carrying four thermonuclear bombs, collided in mid-air with KC-135 tanker plane near Palomares, Spain. Three of the four hydrogen bombs were soon found on land near Palomares, and the fourth bomb was recovered from the Mediterranean Sea on 7 April.

A search was made to find an actress to play the Spanish girl who falls for Cliff, and the 21-year-old Viviane Ventura won the role: born in London, but fluent in Spanish, she sang a spirited duet with Cliff on "Paella".

It was during the making of the film that Richard became Christian.

== Soundtrack ==
The soundtrack album featured eleven tracks from the movie (one of which is a medley), plus three additional songs. Of the film tracks, Cliff Richard and the Shadows perform eight of the tracks while the Shadows three (including the medley).

=== Track listing ===
1. "Finders Keepers" (Cliff Richard and The Shadows)
2. "Time Drags By" (Cliff Richard and The Shadows)
3. "Washerwoman" (Cliff Richard and The Shadows)
4. "La La La song" (Cliff Richard and The Shadows)
5. "My Way" (The Shadows)
6. "Oh Senorita" (Cliff Richard and The Shadows)
7. "Spanish Music" (The Shadows)
8. "Fiesta" (Cliff Richard and The Shadows)
9. "This Day" (Cliff Richard and The Shadows)
10. "Paella" (Cliff Richard and The Shadows)
11. "Finders Keepers"/"My Way"/"Paella"/"Fiesta" (Medley) (The Shadows)
12. "Run to the Door" (Cliff Richard) (not in the film)
13. "Where Did the Summer Go" (Cliff Richard) (not in the film)
14. "Into Each Life Some Rain Must Fall" (Cliff Richard and The Shadows) (not in the film)

== Critical reception ==
The Monthly Film Bulletin wrote: "Where previous Cliff Richard musicals (Wonderful Life [1964], Summer Holiday [1963]) had an engaging spontaneity about them, this one rollicks along with a clockwork joviality that makes no demands on anyone involved, least of all the actors. CIiff Richard and The Shadows hare across some pretty back-projected landscapes in a mood of determined merriment that never changes. Sidney Hayers directs at an appropriately frenetic pace, but does nothing to inject any originality into the proceedings, and even the liberally sprinkled musical numbers (quite attractive in themselves) are dully staged and feebly choreographed. The supporting players, Robert Morley and John Le Mesurier in particular, do their best to break up the stultifying air of respectability; but the whole idea of centering a musical comedy round a mislaid nuclear bomb (based on an actual incident) seems, to say the least, a little ill-conceived."

The Radio Times described the film as a "dismal romp" which "marked the end of Cliff's screen collaboration with the Shadows".

Variety wrote that "Michael Pertwee's screenplay does not build up much urgency or suspense but provides opportunity for colorful fiesta, a gentle romance between Richard and Ventura, some verbal dueling between Robert Morley and Graham Stark".

Sky Movies noted that "Peggy Mount and Robert Morley ('For £10,000, I'd walk naked down Horse Guards Parade') provide formidable comedy support for the stars."

British film critic Leslie Halliwell wrote: "Harmless youth musical without much style. Tunes poor, comedy rather too easy-going."
