= Bachelor Boy =

Single by Cliff Richard and the Shadows

from the album Summer Holiday
- A-side: "The Next Time"
- Released: 30 November 1962
- Recorded: 16 November 1962
- Studio: EMI Studios, London
- Genre: Pop
- Length: 2:02
- Label: Columbia
- Songwriters: Cliff Richard; Bruce Welch
- Producer: Norrie Paramor

Cliff Richard and the Shadows singles chronology
"It'll Be Me" (1962)	"Bachelor Boy" (1962)	"Summer Holiday" (1963)

"Bachelor Boy" is a song by Cliff Richard and the Shadows, written by Richard and Bruce Welch (from the Shadows). It became a hit when it was released as the B-side of Richard's single "The Next Time". Both sides of the single were regarded as having chart potential so both sides were promoted and in many markets "Bachelor Boy" became the bigger hit. The single spent three weeks at No. 1 in the UK Singles Chart in January 1963 and was a major hit internationally, although it only reached No. 99 in the US. Both sides of the single were included on the accompanying soundtrack album Summer Holiday. On the soundtrack album the Michael Sammes Singers were credited as backing singers, although they were not credited on the single.

In the UK, the single was the first of three number 1 hit singles from Richard's musical film, Summer Holiday, the other two being "Summer Holiday" and "Foot Tapper". The film was the most successful box-office attraction of the year.

The single was followed at number one by the Shadows' own single "Dance On!"

The song is about some advice a father passes to his son, to "remain a bachelor boy until (his) dying day". Richard later commented, "I didn't mean it to be, but it finally turned out to be prophetic." While Richard has himself never married, the song itself does not rule out marriage, with the final verse stating that as time goes by, the speaker probably will fall in love marry and have a child "but until then I'll be a bachelor boy..." and indicates he would be happy to remain so for life.

== Chart performance ==
The below table only includes countries where "Bachelor Boy" was listed separately on the chart, or where it was listed first when both were listed together on the chart. For a more complete list of countries where the single made the singles chart, refer to the article for "The Next Time".

Chart (1963–1964)	Peak position
Australia (Kent Music Report)	9
Canada (CHUM) ^{[*]}	2
Denmark (Tracklisten)	1
France (SNEP)	31
Hong Kong	3
Netherlands (Single Top 100)	1
Norway (VG-lista)	8
South Africa (SARMD)	1
Sweden (Kvällstoppen)	2
Sweden (Tio i Topp)	1
UK (NME)	3^{[*]}
US Billboard Hot 100	99

In 1995 the hit got a new lease of life used by Batchelors Beans in Ireland.

Notes:

- * In Canada, the week "Bachelor Boy" peaked at number 2, Richard's "Summer Holiday" was at number 1.
- * In the UK, although the single peaked at number 1 in the Record Retailer singles chart that was later accepted as the retrospective official chart for the period, the competing NME singles chart listed the two tracks separately with "The Next Time" peaking at number 1 and "Bachelor Boy" peaking at number 3.
