= Time Drags By =

1966 single by Cliff Richard and the Shadows

- Cover of the single released in the Netherlands

Single by Cliff Richard and the Shadows

from the album Finders Keepers
- B-side: "La La La Song"
- Released: 7 October 1966
- Recorded: 26 April 1966
- Studio: EMI Studios, London
- Genre: Pop rock
- Length: 2:33
- Label: Columbia
- Songwriter(s): Hank Marvin; Bruce Welch; Brian Bennett; John Rostill
- Producer(s): Norrie Paramor

Cliff Richard and the Shadows singles chronology
"Visions" (1966)	"Time Drags By" (1966)	"In the Country" (1966)

"Time Drags By" is a song by Cliff Richard and the Shadows, released as a single in October 1966. It peaked at number 10 on the UK Singles Chart.

== Recording and release ==
"Time Drags By" was written by all four members of the Shadows for the soundtrack to the film Finders Keepers. It was recorded on 26 April 1966 at Abbey Road Studios, then known as EMI, and was one of the first times the group had used multitracking to double track their vocals. The recording also features Jimmy Page playing harmonica. The B-side, "La La La Song", was also written by the Shadows and included on the soundtrack and features backing vocals by the Corona Boys and Girls.

It was released as a single in October 1966 and was nominated for the 1967 Ivor Novello Award for Best Film Song of the Year, but lost to "Born Free", written by John Barry and Don Black.

== Reception ==
Reviewed in Disc, "Time Drags By" was described as "Cliff doing a Ray Davies and sitting around on the grass contemplating the world at large in barber shop quartet fashion! Starts with a harmonica and actually Cliff sounds as though he's been Lee Hazlewood-ded, as a male Nancy Sinatra. In Record Mirror, it was described as a "well-beated Shadow composition and Cliff gets a relaxed, dreamy atmosphere going".

== Track listing ==
1. "Time Drags By" – 2:33
2. "La La La Song" – 2:26

== Personnel ==
- Cliff Richard – vocals
- Hank Marvin – lead guitar, backing vocals
- Bruce Welch – rhythm guitar, backing vocals
- John Rostill – bass guitar, backing vocals
- Brian Bennett – drums
- Jimmy Page – harmonica

== Charts ==
Chart (1966–67)	Peak position
Australia (Kent Music Report)	98
Malaysia (Radio Malaysia)	1
Netherlands (Dutch Top 40)	37
New Zealand (Listener)	13
Rhodesia (Lyons Maid)	8
UK Singles (OCC)	10
