= Visions (Cliff Richard song) =

- Cover of the single released in Germany

Single by Cliff Richard
- B-side: "What Would I Do (For the Love of a Girl)"
- Released: 15 July 1966
- Recorded: 17 November 1965
- Studio: EMI Studios, London
- Genre: Pop
- Length: 3:01
- Label: Columbia
- Songwriter: Paul Ferris

Cliff Richard singles chronology
"Blue Turns to Grey" (1966)	"Visions" (1966)	"Time Drags By" (1966)

"Visions" is a song released in 1966 by Cliff Richard. The song spent 12 weeks on the UK's Record Retailer chart, peaking at No. 7, while reaching No. 1 in Israel, No. 1 in Malaysia, No. 1 in Singapore, No. 4 on the New Zealand Listener chart, and No. 9 on the Irish Singles Chart. The song was a hit in other nations as well.

Cliff would usually sing the chorus of the song, "When Will We Meet Again", at the end of his TV show It's Cliff Richard.

== Track listing ==
1. "Visions" – 3:01
2. "What Would I Do (For the Love of a Girl)" – 2:29

== Personnel ==
- Cliff Richard – vocals
- Bernard Ebbinghouse Orchestra – orchestra and all instrumentation
- Mike Sammes Singers – backing vocals

== Chart performance ==
Chart (1966)	Peak position
Australia (Kent Music Report)	81
Germany (GfK)	40
Ireland (IRMA)	9
Israel	1
Malaysia (Radio Malaysia)	1
Netherlands (Dutch Top 40)	21
New Zealand (Listener)	4
Singapore (Radio Singapore)	1
UK Singles (OCC)	7
