= Blue Turns to Grey =

1966 single by The Rolling Stones

Song by The Rolling Stones

from the album December's Children (And Everybody's)
- Released: 4 December 1965
- Recorded: 6 September 1965
- Genre: Rock
- Songwriter: Jagger–Richards

"Blue Turns to Grey"

Single by Cliff Richard and the Shadows
- B-side: "Somebody Loses" (Tepper/Bennett)
- Released: 18 March 1966
- Recorded: 17 January 1966
- Label: Columbia
- Songwriter: Jagger–Richards
- Producer: Norrie Paramor

Cliff Richard singles chronology
"Wind Me Up (Let Me Go)" (1965)	"Blue Turns to Grey" (1966)	"Visions" (1966)

"Blue Turns to Grey" is a song that was written by Mick Jagger and Keith Richards. The song first appeared in February 1965 when both Dick and Dee Dee and The Mighty Avengers released versions of it as singles. Another version was released shortly thereafter by Tracey Dey on Amy Records. On Dey's single, the label credits the song to "K. Richard-A. Oldham"—Oldham being the surname of the Rolling Stones' then-manager/producer Andrew Loog Oldham. It was released by The Rolling Stones on their 1965 US-only album December's Children (And Everybody's) later that year. On this album, "Blue Turns to Grey" as well as "The Singer Not the Song" features Brian Jones on a 12-string electric guitar and Keith on a 6-string. It did not see a UK release until the 1971 compilation album Stone Age.

When Cliff Richard and the Shadows released their version as a single in March 1966 it became a hit in a number of countries. In the UK it reached number 15.

== Rolling Stones version ==
=== Personnel ===
- Mick Jagger - lead vocals
- Keith Richards - electric guitar, backing vocals
- Brian Jones - electric guitar
- Bill Wyman - bass guitar
- Charlie Watts - drums

== Cliff Richard and the Shadows version ==
=== Chart performance ===
Chart (1966)	Peak position
Australia (Kent Music Report)	20
Israel	1
Malaysia	2
Netherlands (Single Top 100)	18
New Zealand (Recorded Music NZ)	11
Singapore	2
UK Singles (Official Charts)	15

== Other cover versions ==
Flamin' Groovies released a version of the song on their 1978 album, Flamin' Groovies Now.
