= Summer Holiday (1963 film) =

1963 film by Peter Yates

- UK theatrical release poster
- Directed by: Peter Yates
- Written by: Peter Myers; Ronald Cass
- Produced by: Kenneth Harper
- Starring: Cliff Richard; Lauri Peters; David Kossoff; Ron Moody; The Shadows
- Cinematography: John Wilcox
- Edited by: Jack Slade
- Music by: Stanley Black; Peter Myers; Ronald Cass
- Production company: Elstree Distributors
- Distributed by: Warner-Pathé Distributors
- Release dates: 10 January 1963 (World Premiere, London); 18 February 1963 (UK)
- Running time: 107 minutes
- Country: United Kingdom
- Language: English

Summer Holiday is a 1963 British CinemaScope and Technicolor musical film starring singer Cliff Richard. The film was directed by Peter Yates (his directorial debut), produced by Kenneth Harper. The original screenplay was written by Peter Myers and Ronald Cass (who also wrote most of the song numbers and lyrics). The title sequence and first three minutes are in black and white before jumping to colour.

Herbert Ross choreographed the musical numbers.

== Plot ==
Don and friends Cyril, Steve and Edwin are bus mechanics at the huge London Transport bus overhaul works in Aldenham, Hertfordshire. During a miserably wet British summer lunch break, Don arrives, having persuaded London Transport to lend him and his friends an AEC Regent III RT double-decker bus (which throughout the film still purports to be a route 9 to Piccadilly).

They convert the bus into a mobile home, which they drive across to continental Europe, intending to reach the South of France. On the way, they are joined by a trio of young women Sandy, Angie and Mimsie, who are a singing group Do-Re-Mi, and change their destination to Athens in Greece. Their first stop is Paris where they go to a nightclub where Les Shadows are playing. That night they find a stowaway "boy", Bobby. Bobby is really a runaway girl, Barbara, sick of her overbearing American mother. Next they encounter a mime artist Orlando. Only after saying that they will give him a lift does he reveal that he also has a huge entourage to also be accommodated. Barbara's mother works out where she is and organises for the bus to be stopped and the boys appear in court for carrying passengers. The judge agrees that if they can prove they are all entertainers then they can go, so they put on an elaborate mime show. The show ends in an explosion and they escape, however Barbara is revealed as a girl. The mime troupe depart.

Mrs Winters and a male driver-friend Jerry catch up with the bus in Switzerland. The bus struggles on the steep rough roads. Everyone gets off except Don driving and Barbara as a passenger to lessen the weight. The others walk, encountering a St Bernards dog, which they decide to keep. Mrs Winters and her friend follow the bus into Austria. They stop at Hotel zum Schloss and have a nice meal and pair off to dance. Don and Barbara go off to be alone and he admits that he loves her. Meanwhile Mrs Winters and her friend hide a diamond pendant on the empty bus and inform the Yugoslavian authorities that it has been stolen. The bus is stopped by the border guards. The guards find it, but as it has a locket containing Barbara's picture they give it back.

Despite the efforts of Mrs Winters a shepherdess in Yugoslavia puts them back on the right road, after taking them to her village for bread (they think). But there has been a mistranslation and the village thought Don said "bride" and a marriage ceremony is begun. The boys eventually escape and run back to the bus pursued by armed peasants.

When they reach Athens a large crowd greet them due to media coverage. Wrightmore from the British embassy explains the situation. Mrs Winters arrives. She first wants them arrested then she sees the publicity potential. Don goes off alone to clear his head on a hill overlooking the Acropolis. Mrs Winters locks Barbara in her hotel room while she holds a press conference. Don finds Barbara and asks her to marry him. The team help her escape through the window over the door. At the press conference Barbara announces their engagement and Don seems set to start a holiday firm operating 200 buses so all is forgiven.

== Cast ==
- Cliff Richard as Don
- Lauri Peters as Barbara Winters (Bobby)
- David Kossoff as Magistrate
- Ron Moody as Orlando
- The Shadows as themselves
- Melvyn Hayes as Cyril
- Teddy Green as Steve
- Jeremy Bulloch as Edwin
- Una Stubbs as Sandy
- Pamela Hart as Angie
- Jacqueline Daryl as Mimsie
- Madge Ryan as Stella Winters, Barbara's mother
- Lionel Murton as Jerry
- Christine Lawson as Annie
- Wendy Barry as shepherdess in Yugoslavia
- Nicholas Phipps as Wrightmore
- Tom Oliver

== Production ==
London Transport AEC Regent III RT bus, the model featured in the film

The original director was Sidney Furie but he was held up on The Boys. He was replaced by John Krish. Eventually Peter Yates directed the film.

In April 1962, Associated British Picture Corporation of Elstree bought three used RT double-decker buses (RT2305 (KGU334), RT2366 (KGU395), and RT4326 (NLE990)) from London Transport. They were all converted to look like RT1881 (with a fake registration number, WLB991) so they could be used for filming different segments.

The opening ten minutes were filmed at the Aldenham Works, Elstree, where Cliff's character and friends are mechanics at the main bus servicing depot for London Transport. While on lunch one rainy day, they come up with the idea of converting an old RT bus into a mobile home. They enlist the help of their workmates in a musical segment that uses the track Seven Days to a Holiday. The scenes were shot at the works in 1962, during its annual summer shutdown. Filming included large parts of the works as well as numerous actual employees as extras.

The rest of the film was shot in Greece.

== Soundtrack ==
There are 16 musical numbers in the film:

- "Seven Days to a Holiday"
- "Summer Holiday"
- "Let Us Take You for a Ride"
- "Les Girls"
- "Round and Round"
- "Foot Tapper"
- "Stranger in Town"
- "Orlando's Mime"
- "Bachelor Boy"
- "Swinging Affair"
- "Really Waltzing"
- "All At Once"
- "Dancing Shoes"
- "Yugoslavian Wedding"
- "The Next Time"
- "Big News"

The film's producers felt that female lead in the film, Lauri Peters, was not a strong enough singer after several test recording sessions, and all of her parts, both in the film and on the soundtrack album, were dubbed by session vocalist Grazina Frame. Frame had overdubbed female singing voices in Cliff Richard's earlier film The Young Ones.

Cliff Richard, Melvyn Hayes, and the Shadows were recalled to Elstree some weeks after completion of shooting to record Bachelor Boy, as the distributors felt the film was too short.

== Release ==
The film had its world premiere at the Warner Theatre in London's West End on 10 January 1963. A crowd of 3,000 people turned up to Leicester Square and Cliff Richard was prevented by the crowds from getting out of his car, so did not attend the opening.

In the US, Summer Holiday was released by American International Pictures. AIP briefly retitled the film Summer Affair, before ultimately releasing it under its original title. The American release was edited down to 100 minutes. The film opened in Oklahoma City on 23 October 1963.

Richard's American label Epic Records issued the LP Hits From the Original Sound Track of Summer Holiday, featuring several tracks not featured in the film, including his singles "Lucky Lips" and "Do You Want to Dance".

== Reception ==
=== Box-office ===
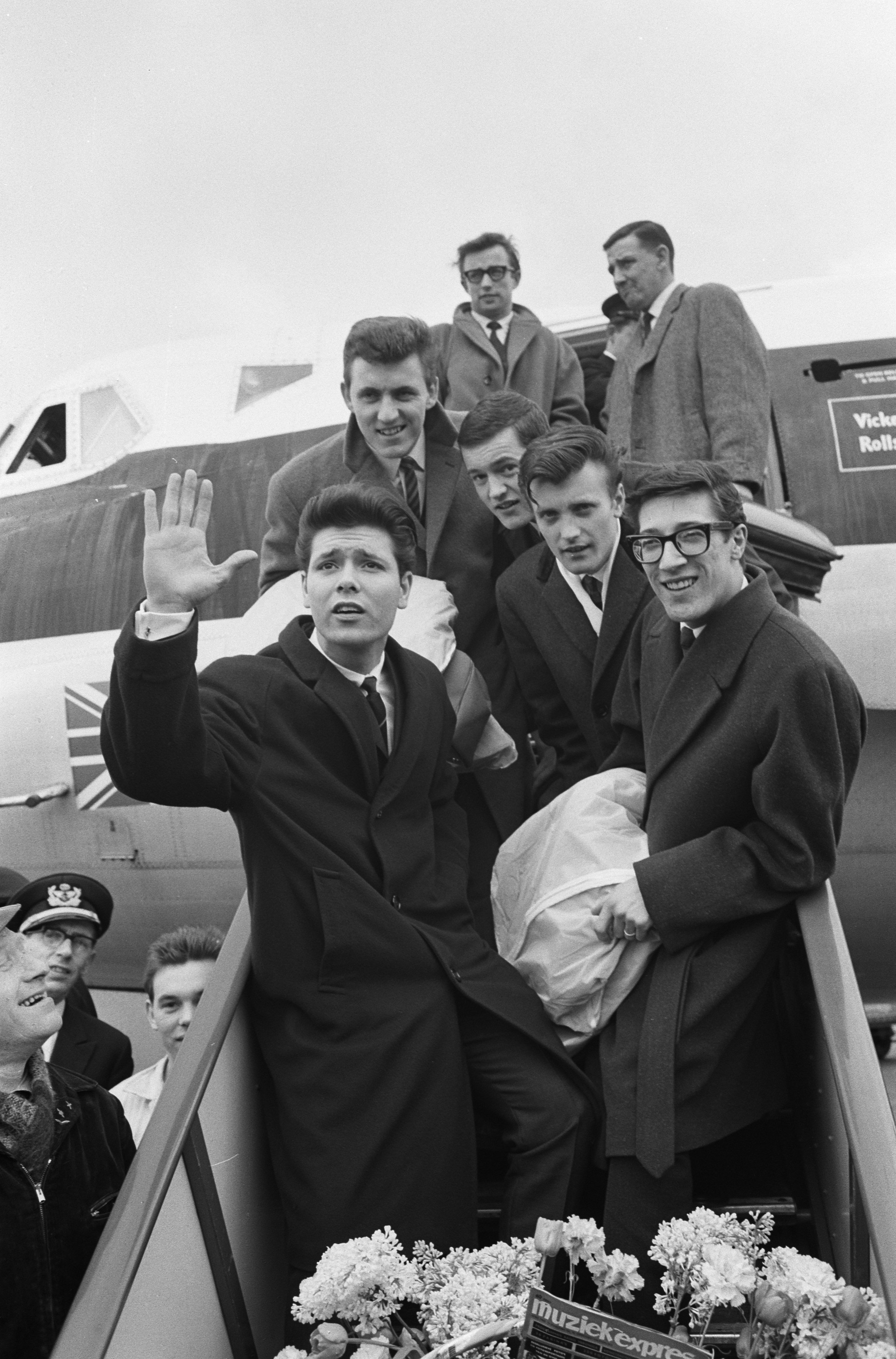
Cliff Richard and the Shadows, April 1962

Summer Holiday was the second most popular movie at the British box office in 1963.

Cliff Richard was voted by exhibitors as the most popular star at the British box-office in the same year.

The film's American release was commercially unsuccessful, which one author attributed to the assassination of President John F. Kennedy.

=== Critical ===
The Monthly Film Bulletin wrote: "Hard on the box-office success of The Young Ones comes another vigorous, likeable but uneven shot at a full-blown British musical. ... There is great pace and drive, as many musical numbers as Cliff Richard can cram in, and plenty of lively slapstick for the boys. But clean-limbed jollity, thumping rhythms, and Technicolor prettiness cannot gloss over slapdash work elsewhere. The rhymes and sentiments of some of the lyrics are painfully banal. The script barely exploits the novelty of touring abroad in a doubledecker bus, preferring instead a string of well-tried situations from the unhappiest tradition of British comic film-making."

Variety wrote: "In CinemaScope and Technicolor, producer Kenneth Harper, valuably aided by director Peter Yates, choreographer Herbert Ross and a varied array of first-league musicians, tunesmiths and orchestrators, has come up with a lively, cneerful tuner. It shows that Richard is no flash in the pan. Also it proves that Britain has at last overcome its diffidence in tackling musical pix. It can safely be recommended to anybody except those to whom the sight of zestful youth enjoying itself is a pain in the neck."

== Cultural impact ==
Many singles from Cliff Richard lifted from the film, including the title track "Summer Holiday", as well as "The Next Time", "Bachelor Boy" and The Shadows instrumental "Foot Tapper" all reached Number one in the British charts during the first three months of 1963.

The film suggested to the photographer Daniel Meadows a way in which he might emulate Benjamin Stone and travel around and photograph Britain from 1973 to 1974.

== Stage adaptations ==
Summer Holiday was adapted into a stage musical in the mid-1990s, starring Darren Day in the role that Cliff Richard played. It premiered for a summer season at The Opera House in Blackpool in 1996, and then later toured nationally, before returning to Blackpool in 1998. The cast for these included Claire Buckfield, Isla Fisher, Faith Brown, Ross King, Peter Baldwin, and Stephen McGlynn. It was also recorded and released on video, entitled "Summer Holiday - The Hits", which was all the musical numbers strung together by clips of Darren Day writing postcards to his friends, and describing what was happening in the story as he wrote.

The stage musical differs in a number of respects from the film version. For example, the route to Athens is via Italy in the stage version rather than the original film route via Yugoslavia. The songs also differ, and include a number of songs from Cliff Richard's other early back catalogue, such as "The Young Ones".

It was revived in 2003, starring Stefan Booth, but later starred Darren Day again. This production also included Day's future partner Suzanne Shaw (from the pop group Hear'say) as Bobby, and Aimi MacDonald as Bobby's mother. The production toured the UK. A further production in 2018 toured the UK with Ray Quinn in the Cliff Richard role and Bobby Crush as "Jerry", the agent.

A revival of the stage musical toured East Anglia in Summer 2022, featuring a professional cast of actor-musicians augmented by local dancers. The production toured the Suffolk and Norfolk coasts, starting in Southwold before heading to Sheringham and finishing in Great Yarmouth.
