= Wind Me Up (Let Me Go) =

1965 single by Cliff Richard

- Cover of the 1982 UK re-release

Single by Cliff Richard
- B-side: "The Night"
- Released: 29 October 1965
- Recorded: 24 August 1964
- Studio: Columbia Studios, Nashville
- Genre: Pop
- Length: 2:27
- Label: Columbia
- Songwriters: John Talley; Bob Montgomery
- Producers: Billy Sherrill; Bob Morgan

Cliff Richard singles chronology
| "The Time in Between" (1965) | "Wind Me Up (Let Me Go)" (1965) | "Blue Turns to Grey" (1966) |

"Wind Me Up (Let Me Go)" is a song by Cliff Richard, released as a single in October 1965. It peaked at number 2 on the UK Singles Chart and received a silver disc for 250,000 sales.

== Recording and release ==
"Wind Me Up (Let Me Go)" was recorded in Nashville, Tennessee, during Richard's visit there in August 1964. It was recorded without the Shadows, instead featuring session musicians and backing vocals by the Jordanaires. The B-side, "The Night”, was credited with the Shadows and was recorded at Abbey Road Studios, then known as EMI, in October 1965. Both tracks were included on the EP Wind Me Up.

== Track listing ==
7": Columbia / DB 7660

1. "Wind Me Up (Let Me Go)" – 2:27
2. "The Night" – 3:24

7": Columbia / C 23 103 (Germany)

1. "Nur bei dir bin ich zu Haus" – 2:42
2. "Glaub nur mir" – 2:42

== Charts ==
| Chart (1965–66) | Peak position |
|---|---|
| Australia (Kent Music Report) | 40 |
| Canada Top Singles (RPM) | 23 |
| Ireland (IRMA) | 5 |
| Netherlands (Dutch Top 40) | 36 |
| Netherlands (Single Top 100) | 15 |
| New Zealand (Listener) | 6 |
| South Africa (Springbok Radio) | 4 |
| Sweden (Sverigetopplistan) | 18 |
| UK Singles (Official Charts) | 2 |

"Nur bei dir bin ich zu Haus"

| Chart (1966) | Peak position |
|---|---|
| Germany (GfK) | 21 |
