= The Interns (band) =

Welsh pop group

The Interns were a Welsh pop group, who performed under that name between 1964 and 1967. They issued four singles in the UK.

== Beginnings ==
Publicity shot for The Rikki Allen Trio

Originally a duo consisting of Rikki Alan (real name Alan Smith, guitar/bass/ vocals), and his brother Gerry Alan (real name Gerald Smith, piano/guitar/vocals), playing local dances and working men's clubs in the area surrounding their home town of Newport, South Wales.

With the addition of Mark Goodwin (drums) they became the Rikki Allen Trio, playing ballroom dates throughout Wales, as well as occasional concert appearances on package shows topped by artists such as Billy Fury, Marty Wilde, and Johnny Kidd.

== London years ==
In 1961, the band turned fully professional, and headed for London. They made their European mainland debut in Germany, May 1963, at the Star Club in Hamburg. Here they shared billings with Ray Charles, The Searchers and (Gerry Allen’s hero) Jerry Lee Lewis. Returning to London, Gerry played piano on singer Paul Raven's (later Gary Glitter) Parlophone disc, "Walk On, Boy". in August 1963, the Rikki Allen Trio band released "The First One" on the Decca label. Also in 1963, the band supported the Rolling Stones on their November–December UK tour, and Vince Hill at the California Ballroom in Dunstable.

In 1964, under the guidance of musical instrument entrepreneur Ivor Arbiter, they morphed into The Interns, picking up another guitarist, Mike Parker (from Walthamstow), which gave the impetus for a name change. The group was managed by the Tito Burns Agency who also managed, Dusty Springfield and The Searchers, amongst others, and recorded for Philips Records. As a result, the band often appeared on the same bill as these artists. For example, on Sunday 23 August 1964, The Interns appeared on the third and last of three Sunday concerts organised by the promoter, Arthur Howes. Dusty Springfield topped the bill, which also featured Eden Kane as well as The High Numbers, who would soon become The Who.

The Interns - Don't You Dare
The Interns single released in the UK in 1964

Publicity shot For The Interns featuring a Gretch guitar

In 1964, the Interns released "Don't You Dare" and "Cry To Me" a cover version of an American record by Brenda Holloway, both singles were produced by Bill Landis. "Don’t You Dare" featured lyrics written by the wives of Rikki and Gerry Allen. The single was advertised in the NME on 20 March 1964. During this period, the group had some television success, appearing regularly on two of the big pop music shows of the time, Thank Your Lucky Stars (e.g., on 11 March 1964) and Ready Steady Go! (e.g., on 17 July 1964). Also in 1964, The Interns appeared in the final part of Ted Willis' The Four Seasons of Rosie Carr, playing the band at the pub where Rosie worked.

== Later careers ==
After splitting from drummer Mark Goodwin and Guitarist Mike Parker in 1966, brothers Rikki and Gerry returned to South Wales, where they continued to perform as a four-piece with a new guitarist and drummer. The new Interns line-up released two more records, "Ray of Sunshine" and "Is It Really What You Want" on Parlophone in the UK and on Capitol Records in the US. Both were recorded at Rockfield Studios, on the outskirts of Monmouth. "Is it Really (What You Want Me to Do)" is considered particularly collectable as it also features Dale Griffin on drums.

Remaining in London, Mark Goodwin took up a number of club residencies before joining the Lonnie Donegan Skiffle Group. Goodwin stayed with the Donegan band into the mid-1970s and during those years played the Riviera Hotel in Las Vegas supporting Vikki Carr in 1970 and Vic Damone in 1971. Donegan and the group played the Greek Theatre in 1969 and it was here that Goodwin met Don Everly of the Everly Brothers. Goodwin spent many hours chatting with Everly about all things musical and was invited to the television studios the next day to attend the recording of the Everly Brothers TV show. Goodwin decided to leave the Donegan group so that he and his new wife Ondrea Lloyd could settle down and start raising a family. It was at this time that Goodwin was invited to join CBS/Arbiter Ltd Musical Instrument Manufacturer and Distributors as drum clinician and promotions manager.

== Rikki Allen Trio discography ==
- "The First One" / "I’ll Pretend I'm Happy", Decca, F11726, 1963

== The Interns discography ==
- "Don't You Dare" / "Here There Everywhere", Philips, BF1320, 1964
- "Cry To Me" / "There's Love For You", Philips, BF1345, 1964
- "Is It Really What You Want" / "Just Like Me", Parlophone, R5479, 1966
- "Is It Really What You Want?" / "Just Like Me", Capitol USA, 5747, 1966
- "Ray Of Sunshine" / "Please Say Something Nice", Parlophone, R5586, 1967
