= Summer Holiday (album) =

1963 soundtrack album by Cliff Richard and The Shadows

Soundtrack album by Cliff Richard and The Shadows
- Released: 18 January 1963
- Recorded: May – November 1962
- Genre: Pop · film score
- Length: 43:33
- Labels: Columbia (EMI) 33SX1472 (mono), SCX3462 (stereo)
- Producer: Norrie Paramor

Cliff Richard and The Shadows chronology
32 Minutes and 17 Seconds (1962)	Summer Holiday (1963)	Cliff's Hit Album (1963)

Singles from Summer Holiday
- 1. "The Next Time"/"Bachelor Boy" Released: 30 November 1962; 2. "Summer Holiday"" Released: 15 February 1963; 3. "Foot Tapper" Released: 22 February 1963

Professional ratings
Review scores
Source	Rating
New Record Mirror	5/5 stars
AllMusic	4/5 stars

Summer Holiday is a soundtrack album by Cliff Richard and the Shadows to the film of the same name. It is their second film soundtrack album and Richard's eighth album overall. The album topped the UK Albums Chart for 14 weeks. Three singles from the album were released. Before the album release both "The Next Time" and "Bachelor Boy" (A- and B-side respectively) had already been hits. This was followed by "Summer Holiday" and lastly "Foot Tapper" (by the Shadows). All three singles topped the UK singles chart.

== Rare Release ==
A "special edition" double-album (limited to 80 copies) was given to the cast and crew of the movie and has since become very collectible, with an original selling for £498 in 2010.

== Track listing ==
Side one
No.	Title	Writer(s)	Performer(s)	Length
1.	"Seven Days to a Holiday"	Ronald Cass, Peter Myers	Cliff Richard, A.B.S. Orchestra, The Michael Sammes Singers	3:13
2.	"Summer Holiday"	Brian Bennett, Bruce Welch	Cliff Richard and the Shadows, The Norrie Paramor Strings	2:10
3.	"Let Us Take You for a Ride"	Cass, Myers	Cliff Richard, A.B.S. Orchestra, The Michael Sammes Singers	4:39
4.	"Les Girls"	Bennett, Hank Marvin, Welch	The Shadows	2:00
5.	"Round and Round"	Bennett, Marvin, Welch	The Shadows	2:05
6.	"Foot Tapper"	Marvin, Welch	The Shadows	2:27
7.	"Stranger in Town"	Cass, Myers	Cliff Richard, A.B.S. Orchestra	2:35
8.	"Orlando's Mime"	Stanley Black	A.B.S. Orchestra	2:18

Side two
No.	Title	Writer(s)	Performer(s)	Length
1.	"Bachelor Boy"	Cliff Richard, Welch	Cliff Richard and the Shadows, The Michael Sammes Singers	2:02
2.	"A Swingin' Affair"	Cass, Myers	Cliff Richard, Grazina Frame, A.B S. Orchestra	4:18
3.	"Really Waltzing"	Cass, Myers	Cliff Richard, A.B.S. Orchestra, The Michael Sammes Singers	1:57
4.	"All at Once"	Cass, Myers	Cliff Richard, A.B.S. Orchestra	3:52
5.	"Dancing Shoes"	Marvin, Welch	Cliff Richard and the Shadows	2:11
6.	"Yugoslav Wedding"	Cass, Myers	A.B.S. Orchestra	3:00
7.	"The Next Time"	Buddy Kaye, Philip Springer	Cliff Richard and the Shadows, The Norrie Paramor Strings	2:58
8.	"Big News"	Cass, Michael Conlin, Richard	Cliff Richard and the Shadows	1:54

== Personnel ==
Cliff Richard and the Shadows

- Cliff Richard – lead vocals
- Hank Marvin – lead guitar, electric piano on Bachelor Boy
- Bruce Welch – rhythm guitar
- Brian 'Licorice' Locking – bass guitar
- Brian Bennett – drums

== Chart performance ==
Chart (1963)	Peak position
UK Albums (Official Charts)	1
Canada Albums (CHUM)	1
Norwegian Albums (VG-lista)	1
