= The Next Time =

Single by Cliff Richard, The Shadows and the Norrie Paramor Strings

from the album Summer Holiday
- B-side: "Bachelor Boy"
- Released: 30 November 1962
- Recorded: 10 May and 19 November 1962
- Studio: EMI Studios, London
- Genre: Pop
- Length: 2:59
- Label: Columbia
- Songwriters: Buddy Kaye; Philip Springer
- Producer: Norrie Paramor

Cliff Richard, The Shadows and the Norrie Paramor Strings singles chronology
| "Wonderful to Be Young" (1962) | "The Next Time" (1962) | "Summer Holiday" (1963) |

"The Next Time" backed with "Bachelor Boy" was the first of three number one hit singles from the Cliff Richard musical, Summer Holiday. Both sides were marketed as songs with chart potential, and the release is viewed retroactively as a double A-side single. However, technically double A-sides were not regarded as such until 1965, so "The Next Time" was pressed as the A-side, with "Bachelor Boy" the B-side (written by Bruce Welch and Cliff Richard). The song was succeeded at number one by The Shadows' "Dance On!".

The recording of the song took place at Abbey Road Studios in London on 10 May 1962. It was produced by Norrie Paramor and engineered by Malcolm Addey. The single spent three weeks at No. 1 in the UK Singles Chart in January 1963.

The song was included on the January 1963 album Summer Holiday. The film was the most successful box-office attraction of the year.

== Chart performance ==
The single is retroactively referred to as a double A-side because both sides of the single were promoted. In many countries, "Bachelor Boy" became the bigger hit and the charts listed it first or on its own. In some countries both songs were listed separately on the charts despite them being the same record.

=== The Next Time ===
| Chart (1962/63) | Peak position |
|---|---|
| Belgium (Ultratop 50 Flanders) | 3 |
| Belgium (Ultratop 50 Wallonia) | 16 |
| Hong Kong | 4 |
| India | 1 |
| Ireland (IRMA) | 1 |
| Israel | 1 |
| New Zealand | 2^{[*]} |
| Norway (VG-lista) | 2 |
| UK (NME) | 1^{[*]} |
| UK Singles (Official Charts) | 1 |

=== Bachelor Boy ===
| Chart (1963) | Peak position |
|---|---|
| Australia (Kent Music Report) | 9 |
| Canada (CHUM) ^{[*]} | 2 |
| Denmark (Tracklisten) | 1 |
| Hong Kong | 3 |
| Netherlands (Single Top 100) | 1 |
| Norway (VG-lista) | 8 |
| South Africa (SARMD) | 1 |
| Sweden (Sverigetopplistan) | 2 |
| UK (NME) | 3^{[*]} |
| US Billboard Hot 100 | 99 |

Notes:

- * Not all New Zealand chart weeks were published in Billboard. The record may have charted higher.
- * In Canada, the week "Bachelor Boy" peaked at number 2, Richard's "Summer Holiday" was at number 1.
- * In the UK, although the single peaked at number 1 in the Record Retailer singles chart that was later accepted as the retrospective official chart for the period, the competing NME singles chart listed the two tracks separately with "The Next Time" peaking at number 1 and "Bachelor Boy" peaking at number 3.
