= Foot Tapper =

1963 single by the Shadows

Single by The Shadows

from the album Summer Holiday
- B-side: "The Breeze and I"
- Released: 22 February 1963
- Recorded: 8 January 1963
- Studio: EMI Studios, London
- Genre: Instrumental rock
- Length: 2:34
- Label: Columbia
- Songwriters: Hank Marvin; Bruce Welch
- Producer: Norrie Paramor

The Shadows singles chronology
"Dance On!" (1962)	"Foot Tapper" (1963)	"Atlantis" (1963)

"Foot Tapper" is an instrumental by British guitar group the Shadows, released as a single in February 1963. It went to number one in the UK Singles Chart, and was the Shadows' last UK number-one hit (not including those where they performed as Cliff Richard's backing group).

== Background and reception ==
Filmmaker Jacques Tati went to see the Shadows at the Olympia in Paris in 1961 and asked them to write a song for his next film. So, Hank Marvin and Bruce Welch wrote "Foot Tapper". However, Tati had funding difficulties and his next film, Playtime, did not appear until 1967. Instead, in 1963, the Shadows had a small role in the film Summer Holiday and its producer Peter Yates needed some music for the radio in the bus scene, so they offered up "Foot Tapper". It was released in February as a re-recorded double A-sided single with the pop standard "The Breeze and I" a week earlier than planned. Though officially issued as a double A-side, chart compilers elected to only give chart placement to "Foot Tapper". "The Breeze and I" did not chart in any country.

Reviewed in New Record Mirror, "Foot Tapper" was described as "a beautifully balanced bit of recording with a compelling theme. Hank, Licorice and Bruce are in precise, driving form – but the side showcases Brian's forceful but controlled drumming, notably on cymbals. Just try and stop your foot tapping. It'll fair hurtle into the charts – and is probably even better than "Dance On". Reviewing for Disc, Don Nicholl described "Foot Tapper" as a "light-hearted modern dancer which will pull in as many customers as the other side – maybe more".

It is also known for being the signature tune and closing theme for the BBC Radio 2 programme Sounds of the 60s, from when it started in 1983 until Brian Matthew left the show in 2017.

== Track listing ==
7": Columbia / DB 4984

1. "Foot Tapper" – 2:34
2. "The Breeze and I" – 2:47

== Personnel ==
- Hank Marvin – electric lead guitar
- Bruce Welch – acoustic rhythm guitar
- Brian "Licorice" Locking – electric bass guitar
- Brian Bennett – drums, sistrum

== Charts ==
Chart (1963)	Peak position
Australia (Kent Music Report)	2
Denmark (Danmarks Radio)	13
Ireland (IRMA)	2
Netherlands (Single Top 100)	7
New Zealand (Lever Hit Parade)	2
Norway (VG-lista)	5
South Africa (SARMDA)	4
Sweden (Kvällstoppen)	3
UK Singles (OCC)	1
