= On My Word =

1964 single by Chip Taylor

- Cover of the single released in the Netherlands

Single by Cliff Richard
- B-side: "Just a Little Bit Too Late"
- Released: 4 June 1965
- Recorded: 25 August 1964
- Studio: Columbia Studios, Nashville, Tennessee
- Genre: Pop
- Length: 2:30
- Label: Columbia
- Songwriter: Chip Taylor
- Producers: Billy Sherrill; Bob Morgan

Cliff Richard singles chronology
"Angel" (1965)	"On My Word" (1965)	"The Time in Between" (1965)

"On My Word" is a song written and first released by American singer-songwriter Chip Taylor as a single in April 1964. It was covered by British singer Cliff Richard and released as a single which peaked at number 12 on the UK Singles Chart.

== Cliff Richard version ==
Cliff Richard recorded his version of "On My Word" whilst in Nashville, Tennessee in August 1964 and features backing vocals by the Jordanaires and an orchestra conducted by Stan Applebaum. It was released as a single in June 1965 with the B-side "Just a Little Bit Too Late" written by Hank Marvin and recorded with the Shadows.

Reviewing for New Musical Express, Derek Johnson wrote: "Considerably snappier than "The Minute You're Gone", it's set to a shuffle rhythm with a subtle Latin flavour, plus brass and chirping girls. Cliff sings in huskily appealing low register, which contrasts effectively with the bouncing beat. The melody's not quite so whistleable as his last one, but it has an insistent quality".

=== Track listing ===
7": Columbia / DB 7596

1. "On My Word" – 2:30
2. "Just a Little Bit Too Late" – 2:35

=== Charts ===
Chart (1965)	Peak position
Australia (Kent Music Report)	31
Hong Kong	6
Malaysia	9
Netherlands (Dutch Top 40)	20
UK Singles (OCC)	12
