= Lucky Lips =

1957 single by Ruth Brown

Single by Ruth Brown
- B-side: "My Heart Is Breaking Over You"
- Released: January 1957
- Recorded: September 25, 1956; New York City
- Genre: Pop; R&B
- Length: 2:07
- Label: Atlantic 1125
- Songwriters: Jerry Leiber; Mike Stoller

Ruth Brown singles chronology
"I Still Love You" (1957)	"Lucky Lips" (1957)	"One More Time" (1957)

Lucky Lips is a song written by Jerry Leiber and Mike Stoller. It was originally recorded by Ruth Brown in 1956 and was successfully covered by Cliff Richard in 1963.

== Ruth Brown and early cover versions ==
The song was first recorded by the R&B singer Ruth Brown for Atlantic Records in New York in September 1956, and was released as a single in early 1957. It was her second hit on the US pop chart, after "(Mama) He Treats Your Daughter Mean" in 1953, reaching number 25 on the pop chart and number 6 on the Billboard R&B chart.

The song was covered by the white singer Gale Storm, as the B-side of her single "On Treasure Island", for Dot Records. Storm's recording reached number 77 on the Billboard pop chart. The song was also covered by Dottie Evans for Bell Records. In Britain, it was recorded by Alma Cogan as the B-side of "Whatever Lola Wants", which reached number 26 on the UK singles chart, also in 1957.

== Cliff Richard version ==
"Lucky Lips"

Single by Cliff Richard and The Shadows
- B-side: "I Wonder"
- Released: May 3, 1963
- Recorded: March 8, 1963
- Studio: EMI Studios, London
- Genre: Pop
- Length: 2:41
- Label: Columbia
- Songwriters: Jerry Leiber; Mike Stoller
- Producer: Norrie Paramor

Cliff Richard and The Shadows singles chronology
"Summer Holiday" (1962)	"Lucky Lips" (1963)	"It's All in the Game" (1963)

Official audio
- "Lucky Lips" (1998 Remaster) on YouTube

(German chronology)

"Rote Lippen soll man küssen"

Single by Cliff Richard and The Shadows
- B-side: "Let's Make A Memory"
- Released: September 1963 (Germany)
- Recorded: August 11, 1963
- Studio: Abbey Road, London
- Genre: Pop
- Length: 2:41
- Label: Columbia
- Songwriters: de:Hans Bradtke; Mike Stoller
- Producer: Norrie Paramor

Cliff Richard and The Shadows singles chronology
"It's All in the Game" (1963)	"Rote Lippen soll man küssen" (1963)	"Don't Talk to Him" (1963)

Official audio
- "Rote Lippen Soll Man Küssen" on YouTube

In 1963 the song was recorded by Cliff Richard, whose version went to number 4 in the UK. It was more successful internationally, reaching number 1 in Belgium, Denmark, Hong Kong, India, Israel, Netherlands, Norway, South Africa and Sweden. His version with German lyrics reached number 1 in West Germany, Austria and Switzerland. Richard was presented with a Gold disc by EMI Records for one million worldwide sales of "Lucky Lips".

Richard's German version, titled "Rote Lippen soll man küssen" ("Red Lips Should Be Kissed"), with lyrics by Hans Bradtke, stayed at number 1 in West Germany for seven weeks and had sold half a million by the end of 1963. The English version also charted in West Germany in its own right before the German version was released in September.

=== Chart performance ===
"Lucky Lips" (English version)

Chart (1963)	Peak position
UK Singles (Official Charts)	4
Australia (Kent Music Report)	4
Belgium (Ultratop 50 Flanders)	1
Belgium (Ultratop 50 Wallonia)	7
Canada (CHUM)	8
Denmark (Tracklisten)	1
Finland (IFPI Finland)	2
France (SNEP)	7
Germany (GfK)	1
Hong Kong	1
Ireland (IRMA)	1
Israel	1
Netherlands (Single Top 100)	1
Norway (VG-lista)	1
South Africa (SARMD)	1
Spain (Promusicae)	10
Sweden (Kvällstoppen)	1
Sweden (Tio i Topp)	1
US (Billboard Hot 100)	62

"Rote Lippen soll man küssen" (German version)

Chart (1963–1964)	Peak position
Austria (Ö3 Austria Top 40)	1
Germany (GfK)	1
Switzerland (Schweizer Hitparade)	1

== Other notable versions ==
With lyrics in Swedish by Christer Jonasson as "Slit och släng", Siw Malmkvist scored a 9 week long Svensktoppen hit with the song from November 5, 1966 – January 14, 1967, peaking at #2. These lyrics reflects the society of Swedish in the 1950s and 60s.

Estonian singer Ivo Linna and his band Rock Hotell recorded an Estonian language version titled Kikilips (Bowtie) about the article of clothing in 1980. His version has become a very well-known song in Estonia.

In 2003, Florian Ast released a Bernese German version titled "Schöni Meitschi" (Beautiful Girls). The song reached #7 in Schweizer Hitparade.
