= John Rostill =

English bass guitarist

- Born: John Henry Rostill; 16 June 1942; Kings Norton, Birmingham, Warwickshire, England
- Died: 26 November 1973 (aged 31) Radlett, Hertfordshire, England
- Genres: Rock and roll, country, pop
- Occupations: Bassist, musician, songwriter
- Instrument: Bass guitar
- Years active: 1962–1973
- Label: Columbia

John Henry Rostill (16 June 1942 – 26 November 1973) was an English musician, bassist and composer, recruited by the Shadows to replace Brian Locking in autumn 1963.

He wrote many of the tunes by the Shadows including "The Rise and Fall of Flingel Bunt" in 1964. He wrote or co-wrote three songs in the 1970s which were massive hits for Olivia Newton-John in the United States—"Let Me Be There", "If You Love Me, Let Me Know" and "Please Mr. Please"—but died before seeing them succeed.

== Biography ==
Born in Kings Norton, Birmingham, England, Rostill attended Rutlish School in south London (1953–59). He worked with several artists before joining the Shadows, including Bournemouth band The Interns (nowadays sometimes confused with Welsh band The Interns, who were based in London at this time signed with Tito Burns Agency; in fact, they were two different bands), the Flintstones and a stint as part of Zoot Money's early backing band. He also played in the bands recruited to back such visiting artists as the Everly Brothers and Tommy Roe.

Stylistically, Rostill combined the solidity of Brian Locking and the adventurousness of Jet Harris. Many of his bass lines were heavily syncopated and he developed a range of new sounds on the Burns bass during his time with the group, a longer period than Harris and Locking put together. To many players, Rostill was ahead of his time and included double-stopping in his technique. Unusually for that time, Rostill sometimes played bass finger-style as well as with a plectrum, depending on the sound he wanted.

After the Shadows' break-up at the end of the 1960s, Rostill toured with Tom Jones.

Rostill was a prolific songwriter, contributing to the Shadows' output from the start (both as a solo composer and as part of the mid-sixties "Marvin/Welch/Bennett/Rostill" team). This combination composed the hits "The Rise and Fall of Flingel Bunt" (a UK no. 5, 1964) and “Genie with the Light Brown Lamp" (UK no. 17, 1965) as well as all the tunes on the 1964 Rhythm & Greens EP.

They also wrote the Cliff Richard and the Shadows hits, "I Could Easily Fall (In Love with You)" (UK no. 6, 1964), "Time Drags By" (UK no. 10, 1966) and "In the Country" (UK no. 6, 1967).

He later went on to write for artists such as Olivia Newton-John ("Let Me Be There" (Aus no. 11, US no. 6, 1973), "If You Love Me, Let Me Know" (Aus no. 2, US no. 5, 1974) and "Please Mr. Please" (Aus no. 35, US no. 3, 1975), the last co-written with Bruce Welch). "If You Love Me" and "Let Me Be There" were also recorded in concert by Elvis Presley after Rostill's death.

As a Shadow, Rostill played a prototype Burns "Shadows" bass guitar which differed from the production model that followed. A replica of his bass was produced by Burns London in late 2006. His personal favourite instrument was a Fender Jazz bass, which he played in both the Terry Young Band and in Bournemouth band, the Interns. He also used it with the Shadows towards the end when the Burns instrument began to wear out.

John Rostill died in Radlett, Hertfordshire, England, on 26 November 1973 aged 31. He was found dead from barbiturate poisoning in his recording studio by his wife and Bruce Welch. The coroner recorded a verdict of "suicide while in a depressed state of mind".

He left behind his wife Margaret and his son Paul, who was a year old when his father died.

=== Early career ===
1963 – Zoot Money Quartet

- Zoot Money (keyboards); Andy Summers (guitar); Jimmy Shipstone (guitar); John Rostill (bass); Colin Allen (drums)

1964 – The Interns

== Discography ==
- 1969: Tom Jones Live in Las Vegas
- 1971: "Funny Old World"/"Green Apples" – Columbia – DB 8794.

== Filmography ==
- Wonderful Life (US title: Swingers' Paradise)
- Finders Keepers
- Rhythm 'n Greens (B-film)
- Thunderbirds are Go (as puppets)

== Pantomimes ==
- Aladdin (appeared with Cliff Richard)
- Cinderella (appeared with Cliff Richard)

== Bibliography ==
- Funny Old World by Rob Bradford (1988)

Republished in 2023 with updated colour photographs.
