= Private Collection: 1979–1988 =

1988 compilation album by Cliff Richard

Compilation album by Cliff Richard
- Released: 7 November 1988
- Recorded: 1978–1988
- Genre: Pop; rock
- Label: EMI
- Producer: Terry Britten; Alan Tarney; Craig Pruess; Cliff Richard; Richard Hewson; Stuart Colman; John Farrar; Mike Batt; Andrew Lloyd Webber; Paul Moessl; Gus Dudgeon

Cliff Richard chronology
Always Guaranteed (1987)	Private Collection: 1979–1988 (1988)	Stronger (1989)

Singles from Private Collection: 1979–1988
- 1. "Mistletoe and Wine" Released: November 1988

Professional ratings
Review scores
Source	Rating
AllMusic	2.5/5 stars

Private Collection: 1979–1988 is a compilation album by Cliff Richard, released in 1988. It features songs such as the number one single "We Don't Talk Anymore" from 1979, to his latest release at the time, the Christmas number one hit "Mistletoe and Wine". The album reached number one on the UK Albums Chart.

== Track listing ==
1. "Some People"
2. "Wired for Sound"
3. "All I Ask of You" (with Sarah Brightman)
4. "Carrie"
5. "Remember Me" *
6. "True Love Ways"
7. "Dreamin'"
8. "Green Light" *
9. "She Means Nothing to Me" (with Phil Everly)
10. "Heart User" *
11. "A Little in Love"
12. "Daddy's Home"
13. "We Don't Talk Anymore"
14. "Never Say Die (Give a Little Bit More)"
15. "The Only Way Out"
16. "Suddenly" (with Olivia Newton-John)
17. "Slow Rivers" (with Elton John)*
18. "Please Don't Fall in Love"
19. "Little Town"
20. "My Pretty One"
21. "Ocean Deep"
22. "She's So Beautiful" (with Stevie Wonder; from Dave Clark's "Time": The Album)
23. "Two Hearts" *
24. "Mistletoe and Wine"

* Excluded from the compact disc release of Private Collection due to CD time constraints.

== Charts and certifications ==
=== Weekly charts ===
Chart (1988–1990)	Peak position
Australian Albums (ARIA)	10
New Zealand Albums (RMNZ)	6
UK Albums (OCC)	1

=== Year-end charts ===
Chart (1988)	Position
UK Albums (OCC)	2

=== Certifications ===
Region	Certification	Certified units/sales
Australia (ARIA)	Platinum	70,000^{^}
New Zealand (RMNZ)	Platinum	15,000^{^}
United Kingdom (BPI)	4× Platinum	1,200,000^{^}
^{^} Shipments figures based on certification alone.
