= The Hit List (Cliff Richard album) =

1994 compilation album by Cliff Richard

Greatest hits album by Cliff Richard
- Released: 3 October 1994
- Genre: Pop; rock
- Label: EMI

Cliff Richard chronology
The Album (1993)	The Hit List (1994)	Songs from Heathcliff (1995)

Singles from The Hit List
- 1. "Miss You Nights" Released: 28 November 1994

Professional ratings
Review scores
Source	Rating
Music Week	5/5 stars

The Hit List, released with the subtitle The Best of 35 Years, is a compilation album by English singer Cliff Richard. Released in October 1994, the album reached number 3 in the UK Albums Chart and was certified platinum in the UK. The album celebrates Richard's 35th anniversary in the music industry and compiled all of Richard's top 5 UK hit singles, which coincidentally totalled 35 at the time. Two bonus tracks were also chosen by Richard for the album – "Miss You Nights", at the request of fans for a re-release, and "Green Light" a favourite of Richard's.

Partially in support of the album, the double A-side single "All I Have to Do Is Dream" / "Miss You Nights" was released in late November. Although "All I Have to Do Is Dream" (a live recording with Phil Everly) was not included on the album, "Miss You Nights" was. The single reached number 14 on the UK Singles Chart.

== Track listing ==
Disc 1

1. "Move It" (with The Drifters)
2. "Living Doll" (with The Drifters)
3. "Travellin' Light" (with The Shadows)
4. "A Voice in the Wilderness" (with The Shadows)
5. "Fall in Love with You" (with The Shadows)
6. "Please Don't Tease" (with The Shadows)
7. "Nine Times Out of Ten" (with The Shadows)
8. "I Love You" (with The Shadows)
9. "Theme for a Dream" (with The Shadows)
10. "Gee Whiz It's You" (with The Shadows)
11. "A Girl Like You" (with The Shadows)
12. "When the Girl in Your Arms Is the Girl in Your Heart" (with Norrie Paramor and his Orchestra)
13. "The Young Ones" (with The Shadows)
14. "Do You Wanna Dance" (with The Shadows)
15. "It'll Be Me" (with The Shadows)
16. "The Next Time" (with The Shadows and the Norrie Paramor Strings)
17. "Bachelor Boy" (with The Shadows)
18. "Summer Holiday" (with The Shadows and the Norrie Paramor Strings)
19. "Lucky Lips" (with The Shadows)
20. "It's All in the Game"

Disc 2

1. "Don't Talk to Him" (with The Shadows)
2. "Constantly"
3. "The Minute You're Gone"
4. "Wind Me Up (Let Me Go)"
5. "Congratulations"
6. "Power to All Our Friends"
7. "We Don't Talk Anymore"
8. "Carrie"
9. "Wired for Sound"
10. "Daddy's Home"
11. "Some People"
12. "Mistletoe and Wine"
13. "The Best of Me"
14. "I Just Don't Have the Heart"
15. "Saviour's Day"
16. "Miss You Nights"
17. "Green Light"

== Charts ==
=== Weekly charts ===
Chart (1994–1995)	Peak position
Australian Albums (ARIA)	2
Dutch Albums (Album Top 100)	38
New Zealand Albums (RMNZ)	5
UK Albums (OCC)	3

=== Year-end charts ===
Chart (1994)	Position
UK Albums (OCC)	15

== Certifications ==
Region	Certification	Certified units/sales
Australia (ARIA)	Gold	35,000^{^}
New Zealand (RMNZ)	2× Platinum	30,000^{^}
United Kingdom (BPI)	Platinum	300,000^{*}
^{*} Sales figures based on certification alone.^{^} Shipments figures based on certification alone.
