= Remember Me (Cliff Richard song) =

1987 single by Cliff Richard

Single by Cliff Richard

from the album Always Guaranteed
- B-side: "Another Christmas Day"
- Released: 19 October 1987
- Recorded: September 1986
- Studio: RG Jones, London
- Genre: Pop rock
- Length: 3:52
- Label: EMI
- Songwriter(s): Alan Tarney
- Producer(s): Alan Tarney

Cliff Richard singles chronology
"Some People" (1987)	"Remember Me" (1987)	"Two Hearts" (1988)

Music video
- "Remember Me" on YouTube

"Remember Me" is a song recorded by English singer Cliff Richard and released in October 1987 as the third single from his Always Guaranteed album. The song reached number 35 in the UK Singles Chart and the top 20 in Germany and Ireland.

The song was written by Alan Tarney who had previously written some of Richard's most successful tracks since his 1976 renaissance, including "We Don't Talk Anymore", "Dreamin'", "A Little in Love" and "Wired for Sound".

A live version of the song was released on the re-release of Richard's From a Distance: The Event album in 2005.

== Track listing ==
UK 7" Single (EM 31)

1. "Remember Me"
2. "Another Christmas Day"

UK 12" Single (12EM 31)

1. "Remember Me" (Extended Version)
2. "Another Christmas Day"
3. "Brave New World"

UK CD single (CDEM 31)

1. "Remember Me"
2. "Some People"
3. "Another Christmas Day"
4. "Remember Me" (Extended Version)

== Chart performance ==
Weekly Chart (1987)	Peak position
Belgium (Ultratop 50 Flanders)	22
Germany (GfK)	20
Ireland (IRMA)	14
UK Singles (OCC)	35
