= Two Hearts (Cliff Richard song) =

1988 single by Cliff Richard

Single by Cliff Richard

from the album Always Guaranteed
- B-side: "Yesterday, Today, Forever"
- Released: 1 February 1988
- Recorded: September 1986
- Studio: RG Jones, London
- Genre: Pop rock
- Length: 4:09
- Label: EMI
- Songwriter(s): Alan Tarney
- Producer(s): Alan Tarney

Cliff Richard singles chronology
| "Remember Me" (1987) | "Two Hearts" (1988) | "Mistletoe and Wine" (1988) |

Music video
- "Two Hearts" on YouTube

Professional ratings
Review scores
| Source | Rating |
|---|---|
| Number One | 3/5 stars |

"Two Hearts" is a song recorded by English singer Cliff Richard and released in February 1988 as the fourth single from his 27th studio album, Always Guaranteed (1987). The song reached number 34 in the UK Singles Chart and number 21 in Ireland. It is written by Alan Tarney who had previously written some of Richard's most successful tracks since his 1976 renaissance, including "We Don't Talk Anymore", "Dreamin'", "A Little in Love" and "Wired for Sound".

A live version of the song was released on the re-release of Richard's From a Distance: The Event album in 2005.

== Critical reception ==
Paul Simper from Number One declared the song as "a very respectable single. Nice, but nicer than nice, to be honest." William Shaw from Smash Hits complimented it as "a smoochy sort of song with a very grandiose chorus which is bound to be a hit like all Cliff's records always are."

== Track listing ==
- UK 7" Single (EM 42)
1. "Two Hearts"
2. "Yesterday, Today, Forever"
- UK 12" Single (12EM 42)
1. "Two Hearts" (Extended Version)
2. "Yesterday, Today, Forever"
3. "Wild Geese"
- UK CD single (CDEM 42)
1. "Two Hearts"
2. "Yesterday, Today, Forever"
3. "Two Hearts" (Extended Version)
4. "Wild Geese"

== Charts ==
| Weekly Chart (1988) | Peak position |
|---|---|
| Ireland (IRMA) | 21 |
| UK Singles (OCC) | 34 |
