= More to Life =

1991 single by Cliff Richard

Single by Cliff Richard

from the album Trainer (BBC TV series soundtrack)
- B-side: "Mo's Theme (instrumental)"
- Released: 2 September 1991
- Recorded: 10–13 June 1991
- Studio: RG Jones, London
- Length: 4:20
- Label: EMI Records
- Songwriters: Simon May; Mike Read
- Producer: Cliff Richard / Paul Moessl

Cliff Richard singles chronology
"Saviour's Day" (1990)	"More to Life" (1991)	"We Should Be Together" (1991)

"More to Life" is a theme-song to the early 1990s Trainer TV series. The song was written by Simon May and Mike Read. The theme won them a TRIC award for Best TV Theme.

Sung by British singer and actor Cliff Richard, it was released as a single in the UK in September 1991 and reached number 23 on the UK Singles Chart.

== Track listing ==
- UK 7" single (EM 205), CD single (CDEM 205), cassette (TCEM 205)
1. "More to Life"
2. "Mo's Theme" (instrumental)

== Charts ==
Chart (1991)	Peak position
UK Singles (OCC)	23
UK Airplay (Music Week)	12
