= Green Light (Cliff Richard song) =

1979 single by Cliff Richard

Single by Cliff Richard

from the album Green Light
- B-side: "Imagine love"
- Released: 16 February 1979
- Recorded: 17 & 25 April 1978
- Studio: Abbey Road Studios, London
- Genre: Pop rock
- Length: 3:45 (single version); 4:05 (album version)
- Label: EMI
- Songwriter: Alan Tarney
- Producer: Bruce Welch

Cliff Richard singles chronology
"Can't Take the Hurt Anymore" (1978)	"Green Light" (1979)	"We Don't Talk Anymore" (1979)

"Green light" is a song recorded by Cliff Richard and released as a single in February 1979. It was the third single and title track taken from his 1978 studio album Green Light. The song is written by Alan Tarney who went on to write some of Richard's biggest hits, such as the follow-up single "We Don't Talk Anymore" (1979), "Dreamin'" (1980), "Wired for Sound" (1981) and "Some People" (1987).

== Release and reception ==
Released as a single over four months after the released of the album, the single peaked at number 57 on the UK Singles Chart in a three-week run. Nevertheless, it broke his singles-chart drought after his previous three singles in 1978 had all missed the charts. In the US, the track received FM radio airplay on AOR formats, but did not chart.

Richard especially included the original version on his 1994 greatest hits album The Hit List (primarily made up of all Richard's top 5 hits to that time) despite it not even making the Top 40 of the UK Singles Charts. About the two bonus tracks on the album, he said in the cover sleeve of the album "A lot of you asked for a re-release of "Miss You Nights" so just for you it's included as a bonus and just for me, so is "Green Light"!

Music critic Bruce Eder, highlighted a rendition Richard recorded with the backing of the London Philharmonic Orchestra and released in 1983 on the live album Dressed for the Occasion. In reviewing what he described as Richard's "most impressive concert album", he said:

"We Don't Talk Anymore" as performed here could easily be in the running for the best recording ever done by Richard, and "Green Light" isn't far behind.

— Bruce Eder, Eder, Bruce. Review: Cliff Richard - Dressed for the Occasion at AllMusic. Retrieved 10 July 2017.

== Track listing ==
7" (UK)

1. "Green Light" – 3:45
2. "Imagine Love" – 4:20

7" (US)

1. "Green Light" – 3:29
2. "Needing a Friend" – 2:56

7" (Netherlands and Germany)

1. "Green Light" – 4:01
2. "Needing a Friend" – 2:55

== Chart performance ==
Chart (1979)	Peak position
UK Singles (OCC)	57

== Covers ==
- 1979: Yvonne Elliman included her version on her album Yvonne (1979).
