= My Pretty One =

- UK picture sleeve

Single by Cliff Richard

from the album Always Guaranteed
- B-side: "Love Ya"
- Released: 8 June 1987
- Recorded: September 1986
- Studio: RG Jones, London
- Genre: Pop rock
- Length: 3:57
- Label: EMI
- Songwriter(s): Alan Tarney
- Producer(s): Alan Tarney

Cliff Richard singles chronology
"Slow Rivers" (1986)	"My Pretty One" (1987)	"Some People" (1987)

Music video
- "My Pretty One" on YouTube

Alternative cover
- European and Australian picture sleeve

"My Pretty One" is a song recorded by English singer Cliff Richard and released in the UK in June 1987 as the lead single from his Always Guaranteed album. The song reached number 6 in the UK Singles Chart. The song was written by Alan Tarney who had previously written some of Richard's most successful tracks since his 1976 renaissance, including "We Don't Talk Anymore", "Dreamin'", "A Little in Love" and "Wired for Sound". The song was originally recorded and released by Jamie Rae in 1985 as Pretty One.

== Track listing ==
UK 7" Single (EM 4)

1. "My Pretty One"
2. "Love Ya"

UK 12" Single (12EM 4)

1. "My Pretty One" (Extended Version)
2. "Love Ya"
3. "Under the Gun"

== Chart performance ==
Chart (1987)	Peak position
Australia (Kent Music Report)	56
Austria (Ö3 Austria Top 40)	20
Belgium (Ultratop 50 Flanders)	36
Germany (GfK)	31
Ireland (IRMA)	4
Netherlands (Single Top 100)	92
South Africa (Springbok Radio)	10
UK Singles (OCC)	6
