= Always Guaranteed =

1987 studio album by Cliff Richard

Studio album by Cliff Richard
- Released: 14 September 1987
- Recorded: September – November 1986
- Studios: RG Jones, London
- Genre: Pop
- Labels: EMI (except USA, Canada); Striped Horse Records (USA); Capitol Records (Canada)
- Producer: Alan Tarney

Cliff Richard chronology
The Rock Connection (1984)	Always Guaranteed (1987)	Private Collection: 1979–1988 (1988)

Singles from Always Guaranteed
- 1. "My Pretty One" Released: 8 June 1987; 2. "Some People" Released: 17 August 1987; 3. "Remember Me" Released: 19 October 1987; 4. "Two Hearts" Released: 1 February 1988

Alternative cover
- US release

Professional ratings
Review scores
Source	Rating
AllMusic	4/5 stars
BBC	(favourable)

Always Guaranteed is the 28th studio album by Cliff Richard, released in 1987. The album peaked at number 5 in the UK Albums Chart and spent a total of 24 weeks on the chart over 1987–88. The album was certified Platinum by the BPI and achieved sales over 1.3 million globally. The album was produced by Alan Tarney, who had produced two of Richard's previous albums, Wired for Sound and I'm No Hero, in the early 1980s and written Richard's highest selling single, "We Don't Talk Anymore", in 1979. Tarney wrote all but one track on the album.

Four songs from the album were released as singles - "My Pretty One" (UK No. 6), "Some People" (UK No. 3 and certified silver for 250,000 sales), "Remember Me" (UK No. 35) and "Two Hearts" (UK No. 34).

The album marked another strong chart comeback for Richard, giving him a second spell of success in the 1980s, which continued with "Mistletoe and Wine" as the single following on from "Two Hearts".

As was sometimes the case on albums written and produced by Alan Tarney, this album contains two songs that Tarney had previously provided to other artists. "Remember Me" had first been recorded by David Cassidy on his 1985 Romance album. However, Tarney further refined the song for Richard, including rewriting the verses' lyrics. "My Pretty One" had first been recorded by Jamie Rae in 1985 and released as a single but had not become a hit. Richard is quoted as saying he'd never have recorded the song if he'd known someone else had recorded it but also said, after finding out, he didn't mind and later, when discussing the varied styles of songs he'd sung, said about "My Pretty One", "It's just a great pop song".

In the US, the album was retitled simply as Cliff Richard. Richard's original 1965 self-titled album had not been released in the US, so there was no conflict.

== Track listing ==
#	Song title	Songwriter	length
1	"One Night"	Alan Tarney	4:31
2	"Once Upon a Time"	Tarney	4:34
3	"Some People"	Tarney	3:52
4	"Forever"	Tarney	4:03
5	"Two Hearts"	Tarney	4:10
6	"Under Your Spell"	Chris Eaton	4:20
7	"This Time Now"	Tarney	3:59
8	"My Pretty One"	Tarney	3:58
9	"Remember Me"	Tarney	3:54
10	"Always Guaranteed"	Tarney	4:40
	CD Re-issue: Bonus tracks		
11	"Under the Gun"	J. D. Martin, James Andrew Rushing	4:13
12	"Brave New World"	Tarney	4:19
13	"Wild Geese"	Jon Sweet, Rod Trott	4:39
14	"Love Ya"	Richard	3:28
15	"One Time Lover Man"	Richard	3:31
16	"Another Christmas Day"	Richard	3:08
17	"Yesterday, Today, Forever"	Richard	3:36
18	"Reunion of the Heart"	Maldwyn Pope	4:24

== Personnel ==
- Cliff Richard – vocals
- Alan Tarney – guitar, bass, keyboards, backing vocals, programming, arrangements
- Chris Eaton – additional backing vocals
- Paul Cox – photography

== Charts ==
=== Weekly charts ===
Chart (1987–88)	Peak Position
Australian Albums (Australian Music Report)	6
Austrian Albums (Ö3 Austria)	23
Danish Albums (Hitlisten)	4
German Albums (Offizielle Top 100)	9
Dutch Albums (Album Top 100)	19
New Zealand Albums (RMNZ)	3
Swedish Albums (Sverigetopplistan)	49
Swiss Albums (Schweizer Hitparade)	21
UK Albums (Official Charts)	5

=== Year-end charts ===
Chart (1987)	Peak Position
United Kingdom (OCC)	28

== Certifications ==
Country	Provider(s)	Certification	Sales/Shipments
Australia	ARIA	Platinum	70,000+
Austria	IFPI	No Certificate	8,000+
Denmark	IFPI	Platinum	30,000+
Germany	IFPI	No Certificate	40,000+
New Zealand	RIANZ	Gold	10,000+
Sweden	IFPI	No Certificate	5,000+
Switzerland	IFPI	No Certificate	25,000+
UK	BPI	Platinum	300,000+
