= Saviour's Day (song) =

Single by Cliff Richard

from the album From a Distance: The Event
- B-side: "Where You Are" (Dave Cooke, Cliff Richard)
- Released: 26 November 1990
- Recorded: 16–18, 20–23 July 1990
- Studio: RG Jones, London
- Genre: Christmas, pop
- Length: 4:55
- Label: EMI Records
- Songwriter: Chris Eaton
- Producers: Cliff Richard and Paul Moessl

Cliff Richard singles chronology
"From a Distance" (1990)	"Saviour's Day" (1990)	"More to Life" (1991)

Music video
- "Saviours Day" on YouTube

"Saviour's Day" is a song by Cliff Richard. It was the United Kingdom Christmas number one single in 1990, the second occasion Richard had a solo Christmas number one (the first being "Mistletoe and Wine"). The video for the song was filmed in Dorset.

== Composition ==
"Saviour's Day" was written by Chris Eaton and produced by Cliff Richard and Paul Moessl. Eaton wrote the song in October 1989, and took his original version of the song with him to a Christmas party to show to Richard. Eaton had been warned that all of Richard's songs for the following year were already booked in and there would not be space for it. However, Eaton insisted that Richard listen to the tape he brought along, and so they left the party and listened to it in Richard's Rolls-Royce. Richard immediately liked the song and predicted that it could be a number one record.

== Music video ==
The music video for "Saviour's Day" was filmed in Dorset, in the town of Swanage and at Durdle Door. The video was shot in September 1990. Richard and the extras in the video were asked to wear winter clothes for the Christmas song, but the day's filming took place on a warm September day with blue sky and sunshine. The video featured Richard and the extras singing together on top of the limestone arch of Durdle Door.

== Release and reception ==
In the UK, "Saviour's Day" entered the UK Singles Chart on 8 December 1990 at number six. It went to number three the following week, and up a further spot in the week before Christmas. The song became that year's Christmas number one when announced on 23 December 1990 and replacing the previous week's UK number one, "Ice Ice Baby" by Vanilla Ice. A week later "Saviour's Day" dropped back down to number three, and spent only one more week in the top 40 at number twenty. The final charted spot in the top 100 was on 19 January 1991, when "Saviour's Day" was at number 53. The song was Richard's second solo Christmas number one in the UK, after "Mistletoe and Wine" in 1988.

In 2017, ShortList's Dave Fawbert listed the song as containing "one of the greatest key changes in music history".

== Charts and certifications ==
=== Chart positions ===
Chart (1990–91)	Peak position
Australian Singles Chart	97
Belgium (Ultratop 50 Flanders)	36
Ireland (IRMA)	5
Luxembourg (Radio Luxembourg)	2
UK Singles (Official Charts)	1

=== Year-end charts ===
Chart (1990)	Position
United Kingdom (OCC)	21

=== Certifications ===
Region	Certification	Certified units/sales
United Kingdom (BPI)	Silver	200,000^{^}
^{^} Shipments figures based on certification alone.
