= Some People (Cliff Richard song) =

1987 single by Cliff Richard

Single by Cliff Richard

from the album Always Guaranteed
- B-side: "One Time Lover Man"
- Released: 17 August 1987
- Studio: RG Jones, London
- Length: 3:51
- Label: EMI
- Songwriter(s): Alan Tarney
- Producer(s): Alan Tarney

Cliff Richard singles chronology
"My Pretty One" (1987)	"Some People" (1987)	"Remember Me" (1987)

Music video
- "Some People" on YouTube

"Some People" is a song by English singer Cliff Richard, released in August 1987 as the second single from his 1987 studio album, Always Guaranteed. The song reached number three on the UK Singles Chart and was certified silver by the British Phonographic Industry (BPI) for shipments over 250,000. The song reached the top 10 in several other countries as well.

The song was written by Alan Tarney, who had previously written some of Richard's most successful tracks since his 1976 renaissance, including "We Don't Talk Anymore", "Dreamin'", "A Little in Love" and "Wired for Sound". A live version of the song was released in 1990 on Richard's From a Distance: The Event album.

== Track listings ==
UK 7-inch single (EM 18)

1. "Some People"
2. "One Time Lover Man"

UK 12-inch single (12EM 18)

1. "Some People" (Extended Version)
2. "One Time Lover Man"
3. "Reunion of the Heart"

UK CD video single (EMCDV 3)

1. "My Pretty One" (audio only)
2. "Reunion of the Heart" (audio only)
3. "Under the Gun" (audio only)
4. "Remember Me" (audio only)
5. "Some People" (video)

== Charts ==
=== Weekly charts ===
Weekly chart performance for "Some People"
Chart (1987)	Peak position
Australia (Kent Music Report)	7
Austria (Ö3 Austria Top 40)	9
Belgium (Ultratop 50 Flanders)	2
European Hot 100 Singles (Music & Media)	7
Ireland (IRMA)	5
Netherlands (Dutch Top 40)	4
Netherlands (Single Top 100)	5
Sweden (Sverigetopplistan)	20
Switzerland (Schweizer Hitparade)	13
UK Singles (OCC)	3
West Germany (GfK)	6

=== Year-end charts ===
Year-end chart performance for "Some People"
Chart (1987)	Position
Belgium (Ultratop)	6
European Hot 100 Singles (Music & Media)	64
Netherlands (Dutch Top 40)	52
Netherlands (Single Top 100)	58
UK Singles (OCC)	43

== Certifications ==
Certifications and sales for "Some People"
Region	Certification	Certified units/sales
United Kingdom (BPI)	Silver	250,000^{^}
^{^} Shipments figures based on certification alone.
