= Alan Tarney =

British record producer

- Born: 19 November 1945 (age 80)
- Origin: Workington, Cumberland, England
- Genres: Pop; rock
- Occupations: Record producer; songwriter; musician
- Instruments: Bass; keyboards; guitar; vocals
- Years active: 1969–present
- Labels: A&M, Bradley's
- Formerly of: James Taylor Move; The Shadows; Tarney/Spencer Band

Alan Tarney (born 19 November 1945) is an English record producer and musician. He was born in Northside, Workington, Cumberland, but spent his teenage years in Adelaide, Australia, where he met his songwriting and musical partner Trevor Spencer. He is best known for his association with Cliff Richard and A-ha.

== Career ==
=== Musician ===
Tarney was part of the influx of British migrants who settled in Elizabeth during the height of the 1960s pop music boom. His first major group in Australia was James Taylor Move, a four-piece outfit regarded as one of Australia's first psychedelic rock bands; the original line-up in 1967 comprised Tarney on bass, his longtime collaborator Trevor Spencer on drums, Kevin Peek on lead guitar and Robert (R.J.) Taylor on vocals. Both the James Taylor Move and their rising-star contemporaries the Twilights were formed by various members of two earlier Adelaide bands, Johnny Broome and the Handels, and the Hurricanes.

James Taylor Move's (JTM) early concerts were in support of the Twilights, who soon moved to Melbourne. JTM built up a solid following in Adelaide and in early 1967 they won the South Australian final of the Hoadley's Battle of the Sounds. They headed to Melbourne in July for the national finals, and although they were defeated by the Groop they decided to remain there.

Securing a deal with Festival Records they released their debut single "And I Hear the Fire Sing" / "Magic Eyes" in August 1967. The A-side was apparently considered too radical for local radio, but the B-side was picked up, received plenty of airplay in the southern states and became a Top 40 hit in Melbourne. In October, Festival released their second and final single, "Baby Jane", backed by the raga-influenced "Still I Can Go On".

Peek left the band in May 1968, and was replaced by two new members, John Pugh and organist Lance Dixon. Lead singer Robert Taylor left the following month, and he was replaced by the 18-year-old blues/soul singer Wendy Saddington. This second line-up lasted only a few more months and made no commercial recordings before their split at the end of 1968.

Tarney and Spencer were next reunited with Kevin Peek in the Kevin Peek Trio (1968–69). They moved to the UK in 1969, where they recruited an old Adelaide friend Terry Britten (ex Twilights) to join the group, which was then renamed Quartet (1969–70). Quartet recorded one album with Decca Records which remains unreleased, but two singles were issued on Decca: "Joseph" / "Mama Where Did You Fail" (F13072, 1970) and "Now" / "Will My Lady Come" (F12974, 1970).

After the demise of Quartet, the four members became session musicians and songwriters, recording and writing for many top UK acts including Cliff Richard, Ray Martin Hoskins, GTO Records/the Springfield Revival and Australian Olivia Newton-John. Around this time Tarney also joined the Shadows and was a member from 1973 to 1977. Tarney twice participated in the Eurovision Song Contest, supporting the UK entries. In 1973, he provided vocals and bass guitar for Cliff Richard's song Power to All Our Friends placing 3rd in the competition and in 1975, he played piano and sang backing vocals for The Shadows entry Let Me Be The One which placed 2nd. In 1975, he was one half of Tarney/Spencer Band along with Trevor Spencer. They signed a 10-album deal with A&M Records, but met with little success and after three album releases, the group disbanded and discontinued their contract with agreement by the record label.

=== Producer ===
In 1979, Tarney began the biggest period of his career when he wrote and arranged the Cliff Richard No. 1, "We Don't Talk Anymore". This led to him becoming Richard's record producer of his next two albums, I'm No Hero (1980) and Wired for Sound (1981). At this time he also wrote and produced Barbara Dickson and Leo Sayer – his distinctive sound being heard on the hit singles "January February" and "More Than I Can Say".

Tarney went on to bigger success in the mid-1980s when he teamed up with Norwegian pop band A-ha. Producing the second version (after Tony Mansfield) of their first single "Take On Me" (1984), the song went on to become a worldwide hit. He worked on the band's biggest selling first three albums, being a co-producer of Hunting High and Low (1985), and producer of Scoundrel Days (1986) and Stay on These Roads (1988). He renewed his working relationship with the band in the production of their album release Cast in Steel (2015).

He produced David Cassidy's comeback 1985 album Romance, which included the top ten hit "The Last Kiss" co-written by Raymond Hoskins and David Cassidy. The basics of that song had previously been written for Cliff Richard for his 1981 album Wired for Sound. The Richard version however, contained different lyrics and was titled "Young Love".

He returned again to write and produce for the Cliff Richard albums Always Guaranteed (1987) and Stronger (1989).

Tarney wrote two songs for the Sky album Cadmium (1983) - "Return to Me" and "A Girl in Winter" - at the request of long-time associate, and Sky member, Kevin Peek.

Tarney's other production credits include the Hollies, Bow Wow Wow, the Dream Academy, Squeeze, Matthew Sweet, Voice of the Beehive and the Diana, Princess of Wales: Tribute album.

== Personal life ==
Tarney lives in Richmond, London. He has a daughter, Mia, a professional artist painter; and a son, Oliver, who works in the film industry.

== Selected discography ==
=== With the Tarney/Spencer Band ===
Albums:

- 1976 Tarney and Spencer (Bradley's)
- 1978 Three's a Crowd (A&M)
- 1979 Run for Your Life (A&M)
- UICY-90680: A&M 60s & 70s Single Box [Japanese Import] – features two tracks by the Tarney/Spencer band. 5-CD box set

CD reissues

- 2003 Tarney and Spencer (Castle Communications plc), UK with four bonus tracks
- 1993 Run for Your Life (Polydor), German. 1,500 copies
- 19?? Three's a Crowd, Canada
- 19?? Run for Your Life, Canada
- 2009 Three's a Crowd (Tone Arm, Digipak), Sweden with four bonus tracks
- 2009 Run for Your Life (TONE TA 0004, Digipak), Sweden with four bonus tracks

=== Writer/co-writer ===
All chart placings refer to UK Singles Chart only unless indicated otherwise.
Singles:

- "Living in Harmony" by Cliff Richard (1972, No. 12)
- "Hey Mr. Dream Maker" by Cliff Richard (1976, No. 31)
- "Rock and Roll Hall of Fame" by John Farnham (1977)
- "Green Light" by Cliff Richard (1979, No. 57)
- "We Don't Talk Anymore" by Cliff Richard (1979, No. 1, US No. 7)

=== Producer ===
All chart placings refer to UK Singles Chart and UK Albums Chart only unless indicated otherwise.
Singles:

- "Pilot of the Airwaves" by Charlie Dore (1979, No. 66, US No. 13), co-produced with Bruce Welch
- "Why don't you say it" by Elkie Brooks (1980, NCP)
- "January February" by Barbara Dickson (1980, No. 11)
- "Dreaming" by Cliff Richard (1980, No. 8, US No. 10)
- "More Than I Can Say" by Leo Sayer (1980, No. 2, US No. 2)
- "A Little in Love" by Cliff Richard (1981, No. 15, US No. 17)
- "Living in a Fantasy" by Leo Sayer (1981, US No. 23)
- "Wired for Sound" by Cliff Richard (1981, No. 4)
- "Annie Get Your Gun" by Squeeze (1982, No. 43)
- "Orchard Road" by Leo Sayer (1983, No. 16)
- "You Don't Need Someone New" by the Lotus Eaters (1983, No. 53)
- "The Love Parade" by the Dream Academy (1985, No. 68, US No. 40)
- "The Last Kiss" by David Cassidy (1985, No. 6)
- "Take On Me" by A-ha (1985, No. 2)
- "The Sun Always Shines on TV" by A-ha (1985, No. 1)
- "Train of Thought" by A-ha (1986, No. 8)
- "Hunting High and Low" by A-ha (1986, No. 5)
- "I've Been Losing You" by A-ha (1986, No. 8)
- "Cry Wolf" by A-ha (1986, No. 5)
- "Manhattan Skyline" by A-ha (1987, No. 13)
- "My Pretty One" by Cliff Richard (1987, No. 6)
- "Some People" by Cliff Richard (1987, No. 3)
- "Remember Me" by Cliff Richard (1987, No. 35)
- "Two Hearts" by Cliff Richard (1988, No. 34)
- "Stay on These Roads" by A-ha (1988, No. 5)
- "Touchy! " by A-ha (1988, No. 11)
- "You Are the One" by A-ha (1988, No. 13)
- "Lean On You" by Cliff Richard (1989, No. 17)
- "Stronger Than That" by Cliff Richard (1990, No. 14)
- "On My Way Home" by Alice (1990, NCP)
- "You're in a Bad Way" by Saint Etienne (1993, No. 12)
- "Disco 2000" (7" remix) by Pulp (1995, No. 7)
- "Somewhere Over the Rainbow"/"What a Wonderful World" medley by Cliff Richard (2001, No. 11)
- "Let Me Be the One" by Cliff Richard (2002, No. 29)

Albums:

- Skin Deep by Peter Doyle (1977)
- Living in a Fantasy by Leo Sayer (1980, No. 15)
- The Barbara Dickson Album by Barbara Dickson (1980, No. 8)
- I'm No Hero by Cliff Richard (1980, No. 4)
- You Know it's Me by Barbara Dickson (1981, No. 39)
- Wired for Sound by Cliff Richard (1981, No. 4)
- Romance by David Cassidy (1985, No. 20)
- Hunting High and Low by A-ha (1985, No. 2)
- Scoundrel Days by A-ha (1986, No. 2)
- Always Guaranteed by Cliff Richard (1987, No. 5)
- Fortune and Men's Eyes by Jennifer Hall (1987)
- Stay on These Roads by A-ha (1988, No. 2)
- Stronger by Cliff Richard (1989, No. 7)
- Cool Touch by Leo Sayer (1990)
- Wanted by Cliff Richard (2001, No. 11)
- 3 songs on Cast In Steel by A-ha (2015, No. 8): "Door Ajar", "Shadow Endeavors", "Goodbye Thompson"

Studio session musician for:

- The Hollies 1983 album What Goes Around... (guitar, keyboards and production)
- Olivia Newton-John
- The Real Thing
- Bonnie Tyler
- Cilla Black
- Cliff Richard
- The Drifters
- The New Seekers
- Bow Wow Wow
- Squeeze
- Etta Cameron
