= From a Distance: The Event =

1990 live album by Cliff Richard

- Original 1990 release

Live album by Cliff Richard
- Released: 5 November 1990 (original version); 21 March 2005 (reconfigured version)
- Recorded: 16–17 June 1989
- Venues: Wembley Stadium, London
- Genres: Rock and roll; pop
- Label: EMI

Cliff Richard chronology
Stronger (1989)	From a Distance: The Event (1990)	Together with Cliff Richard (1991)

Singles from From a Distance: The Event
- 1. "Silhouettes" Released: 13 August 1990; 2. "From a Distance" Released: 1 October 1990; 3. "Saviour's Day" Released: 26 November 1990

Alternative cover
- 2005 release

Professional ratings
Review scores
Source	Rating
AllMusic	4/5 stars

From a Distance: The Event is a live album by Cliff Richard, released in 1990 by EMI Records. The album was recorded in June 1989 at Richard's "The Event" concert, held at Wembley Stadium in London. A remastered and reconfigured version of the album was released in 2005 by EMI.

== Content ==
The album comprises two sets from Richard's "The Event" concert plus two new studio tracks. The first set is a tribute to Jack Good's 1950s Oh Boy! TV series, the all-music show which had kick-started Richard's career in 1958; it comprises rock 'n' roll era tracks from the TV series featuring original artists of the show The Dallas Boys and The Vernons Girls (led by Maggie Stredder), plus guests The Kalin Twins.

The second set comprises cuts of old and new songs from Richard's main show, including the singles "Silhouettes" and "From a Distance", plus two from his set with The Shadows and one from the Aswad set. Also from the second set, the live recording of "We Don't Talk Anymore", a UK number 1 single for Richard in 1979, was remixed with a contemporary dance beat for the album; a further 7" remix was made for single release in some markets outside the UK (including Germany and Australia).

The Christmas song "Saviour's Day" was one of two new studio tracks, while the other is the ballad "All the Time You Need", a track that had become popular with Richard's fans since he had first performed it in concerts a few years prior, but had only been available on Richard's video album Live & Guaranteed 1988!

== Singles ==
Three singles were released from the album. "Silhouettes" was the first to be released, reaching number 10 in the UK Singles Chart. The second single, "From a Distance", peaked at number 11, and the third single, "Saviour's Day", reached number one, becoming the UK's Christmas number one for 1990.

== Commercial performance ==
From a Distance: The Event peaked at number 3 in the UK Albums Chart and was certified double platinum in the UK.

== Track listing ==
Original 1990 release

The original release was of a double-LP, double-cassette, but a single CD. To fit on a single CD, five tracks were excluded.

1. Medley: "Oh Boy!" / "Whole Lotta Shakin' Going On" / "Bird Dog" / "Let's Have a Party" / "It's My Party" / "C'mon Everybody" / "Whole Lotta Shakin' Going On"
2. "Zing Went the Strings of My Heart" (The Dallas Boys)
3. "Always"
4. "When" (Kalin Twins)
5. "The Glory of Love" *
6. "Hoots Mon" * (Oh Boy! band)
7. "Don't Look Now But" (The Vernons Girls)
8. "The Girl Can't Help It"
9. "Sea Cruise"
10. Medley: "Book of Love" / "Blue Moon" / "Do You Wanna Dance" / "Chantilly Lace" / "At the Hop" / "Rock 'n' Roll Is Here to Stay"
11. "From a Distance"
12. "Some People"
13. "We Don't Talk Anymore"
14. "Shake Rattle and Roll"
15. "Silhouettes"
16. "Move It" (with Jet Harris and Tony Meehan)
17. "Summer Holiday" *
18. "The Young Ones" (with The Shadows)
19. "In the Country" * (with The Shadows)
20. "Good Golly, Miss Molly" *
21. "Fighter"/"Thief in the Night"
22. "Share a Dream" (with Aswad)
23. "All the Time You Need"
24. "Saviour's Day"

* Included in the original LP and cassette release, but not the original CD release.

2005 Re-release

The album was re-released in 2005 as a double-CD set. The first CD comprises the full Oh Boy! set plus the two tracks with The Shadows. The second CD comprises Richard's original full main show only. It excludes the two studio tracks, the duet with Aswad and the remixed version of "We Don't Talk Anymore".

== Charts ==
=== Weekly charts ===
Chart (1990–1991)	Peak position
Australian Albums (ARIA)	25
German Albums (Offizielle Top 100)	65
New Zealand Albums (RMNZ)	3
UK Albums (Official Charts)	3

=== Year-end charts ===
Chart (1990)	Position
UK Albums (OCC)	17

== Certifications ==
Region	Certification	Certified units/sales
New Zealand (RMNZ)	Platinum	15,000^{^}
United Kingdom (BPI)	2× Platinum	600,000^{^}
^{^} Shipments figures based on certification alone.
