= Mistletoe and Wine =

Single by Cliff Richard

from the album Private Collection: 1979–1988
- B-side: "Marmaduke"
- Released: 21 November 1988
- Recorded: 6–10 June & 12–13 July 1988
- Studio: RG Jones, London
- Genre: Christmas, pop
- Length: 4:11
- Label: EMI 203024
- Songwriters: Jeremy Paul, Leslie Stewart and Keith Strachan
- Producer: Cliff Richard

Cliff Richard singles chronology
"Two Hearts" (1988)	"Mistletoe and Wine" (1988)	"The Best of Me" (1989)

Music video
- "Mistletoe and Wine" on YouTube

"Mistletoe and Wine" is a Christmas song made famous as a chart-topping single by Cliff Richard in 1988.

The song was written by Jeremy Paul, Leslie Stewart and Keith Strachan for a musical called Scraps, which was an adaptation of Hans Christian Andersen's "The Little Match Girl" set in Victorian London.

== Background ==
Scraps was first performed at the Orange Tree Theatre, Richmond, London in 1976. The musical was renamed The Little Match Girl and adapted for television by HTV in 1987, and featured Roger Daltrey, Paul Daneman, Jimmy Jewel and Twiggy. As originally conceived, "Mistletoe and Wine" had a different meaning from that for which it has come to be known. The writers wanted a song that sounded like a Christmas carol, intending it to be sung ironically while the little matchgirl is kicked out into the snow by the unfeeling middle classes. By the time the musical transferred to television, the song had become a lusty pub song sung by the local whore, as played by Twiggy.

== Cliff Richard version ==
Richard liked the song but changed the lyrics to reflect a more religious theme (which the writers accepted).

Richard's ninety-ninth single, "Mistletoe and Wine" became his twelfth UK number one single, spending four weeks at the top in December 1988 and selling 750,000 copies in the process. In the short six-week period since its release, it became the highest-selling single of 1988. Furthermore, "Mistletoe and Wine" was the number one single in the United Kingdom on the day of the terrorist downing of Pan Am Flight 103. Simultaneously, it also spent four weeks at the top of the Irish Singles Chart. In December 2007 the single re-entered the UK Singles Chart by virtue of downloads, peaking at number 68. The single went platinum in December 2024, some 36 years after its release. According to analysis of PRS for Music figures, it was estimated that the song generates £100,000 of royalties per year.

Richard's version of the song was also used in a British public information film about drunk driving. The film was part of the Drinking and Driving Wrecks Lives campaign, in which films were shown during ad breaks over the Christmas period. This version also appeared in BBC Two's 2015 comedy-drama A Gert Lush Christmas in the scene where Dan (Russell Howard), his girlfriend Lisa (Hannah Britland) and his family are having Christmas Dinner.

It became 1988's Christmas number one single on 18 December 1988, beating the likes of Petula Clark, Kylie Minogue & Jason Donovan (who got 1988's Christmas number two with "Especially for You" and who ended up spending three weeks at number one in January 1989 with that song), Erasure, Phil Collins, U2 and Angry Anderson to the Christmas top spot.

The music video depicts a Christmas setting with Richard singing the song alongside carollers and a marching band. Future Popstars and Hear'Say star Myleene Klass, then aged 10, was one of the carollers.

=== Charts and certifications ===
==== Weekly charts ====
Chart (1988–1989)	Peak position
Australia (ARIA)	30
Belgium (Ultratop 50 Flanders)	22
Netherlands (Single Top 100)	71
Germany (GfK)	70
Ireland (IRMA)	1
Norway (VG-lista)	7
UK Singles (Official Charts)	1
Chart (2014–2025)	Peak position
Croatia International Airplay (Top lista)	68
Poland (Polish Airplay Top 100)	17
Poland (Polish Streaming Top 100)	47
Slovenia (SloTop50)	32

==== Year-end charts ====
Chart (1988)	Position
United Kingdom (OCC)	1

=== Decade-end charts ===
20s Decade-end chart performance
Chart (2025–2026)	Position
Russia Streaming (TopHit)	168

==== Certifications ====
Region	Certification	Certified units/sales
Denmark (IFPI Danmark)	Gold	45,000^{‡}
United Kingdom (BPI)	Platinum	600,000^{‡}
^{‡} Sales+streaming figures based on certification alone.
