= Cliff Richard =

British singer and actor (born 1940)

Sir Cliff Richard OBE
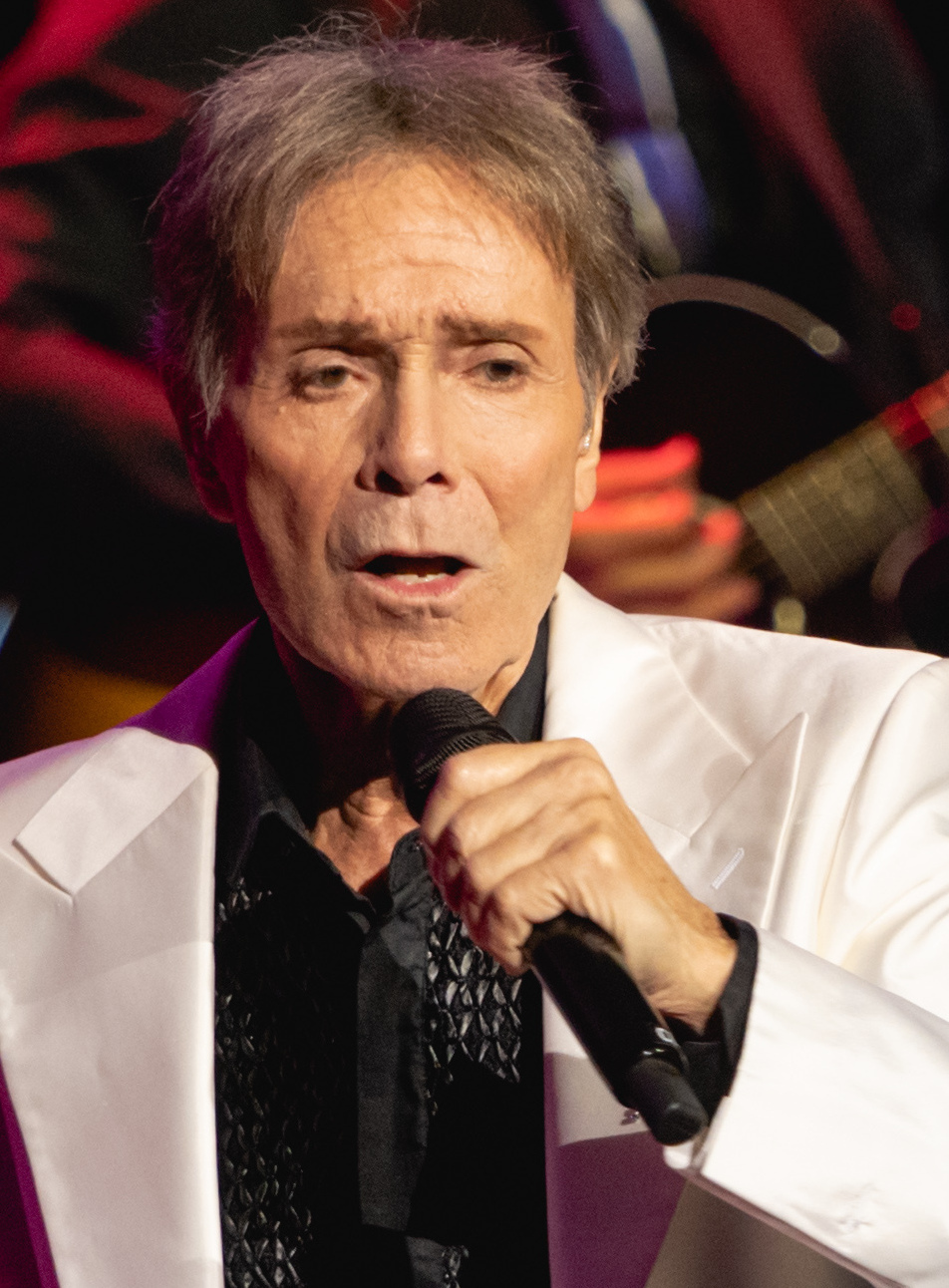
- Richard in 2021
- Born: Harry Rodger Webb; 14 October 1940 (age 86); Lucknow, United Provinces of Agra and Oudh, British India
- Citizenship: United Kingdom; Barbados
- Occupations: Singer; songwriter; actor
- Years active: 1958–present
- Musical career
- Origin: London, England
- Genres: Rock and roll; pop; rockabilly; CCM
- Instruments: Vocals; guitar
- Labels: EMI's Columbia; EMI; Epic; Decca; Rocket; Papillon; Venture3Media; Sony Music; Vox Rock; Warner Music; East West
- Website: cliffrichard.org

Sir Cliff Richard (born Harry Rodger Webb; 14 October 1940) is a British singer and actor. He has total sales of over 21.5 million singles in the United Kingdom and, as of 2026, is the third-top-selling artist in UK singles chart history, behind the Beatles and Elvis Presley.

Richard was originally marketed as a rebellious rock and roll singer in the style of Presley and Little Richard. With his backing group, the Shadows, he dominated the British popular music scene in the pre-Beatles period of the late 1950s to early 1960s. His 1958 hit single "Move It" is often described as Britain's first authentic rock and roll song. Further early hits included "Living Doll", "Travellin' Light" and "Please Don't Tease". He had a successful screen career with films including Expresso Bongo (1959), The Young Ones (1961), Summer Holiday (1963) and Wonderful Life (1964), as well as his own television shows on ITV in the 1960s and the BBC in the 1970s. From the mid-1960s, increased focus on his Christian faith and softening of his music led to a more middle-of-the-road image, and he sometimes ventured into contemporary Christian music. He twice represented the United Kingdom in the Eurovision Song Contest, first in 1968 with "Congratulations" and then in 1973 with "Power to All Our Friends".

In a career spanning more than 65 years, Richard has amassed several gold and platinum discs and awards, including two Ivor Novello Awards and three Brit Awards. More than 130 of his singles, albums and EPs have reached the UK Top 20, more than any other artist. Richard has had 67 UK Top 10 singles, the second highest total for an artist (behind Presley). He holds the record, with Presley, as the only act to make the UK singles charts in all of its first six decades (1950s–2000s). He has achieved 14 UK No. 1 singles, and is the only singer to have had a No. 1 single in the UK in each of five consecutive decades. He also had three UK Christmas No. 1 singles; "I Love You" in 1960, "Mistletoe and Wine" in 1988 and "Saviour's Day" in 1990. He was also part of the 1989 Band Aid II version of "Do They Know It's Christmas?", which was that year's Christmas No. 1 single.

By the late 1990s, Richard had sold more than 250 million records worldwide, making him one of the best-selling music artists of all time. He has never achieved the same popularity in the United States despite eight US Top 40 singles, including the million-selling "Devil Woman" and "We Don't Talk Anymore". In Canada, he had a successful period in the early 1960s and again during the late 1970s/early 1980s, with some releases certified gold and platinum. He has remained a popular music, film and television personality at home in the UK as well as Australia, New Zealand, South Africa, Northern Europe and Asia, and retains a following in other countries. When not touring, he divides his time between Barbados and Portugal. In 2019, he relocated to New York.

== Life and career ==
=== 1940–1958: Childhood and adolescence ===
Cliff Richard was born Harry Rodger Webb on 14 October 1940 at King George's Hospital (now King George's Medical University), Victoria Street, in Lucknow, which was then part of British India. His parents were Rodger Oscar Webb, a manager for a catering contractor that serviced the Indian Railways, and the former Dorothy Marie Dazely. His parents also spent some years in Howrah, West Bengal. After the violence of Direct Action Day, they decided to relocate to Britain permanently. Richard is primarily of English heritage, but he had one great-grandmother who was of half-Welsh and half-Spanish descent, born of a Spanish great-great-grandmother named Emiline Joseph Rebeiro.

The Webb family lived in a modest home in Maqbara, near the main shopping centre of Hazratganj in Lucknow. Dorothy's mother served as the dormitory matron at the La Martiniere Girls' School. Richard had three sisters, Joan, Jacqui and Donna (1942–2016).

In 1948, following Indian independence, the family embarked on a three-week sea voyage to Tilbury, Essex, England, aboard the SS Ranchi. The Webbs moved from comparative wealth in India, where they lived in a company-supplied flat at Howrah near Calcutta, to a semi-detached house in Carshalton, north Surrey. Harry Webb attended a local primary school, Stanley Park Juniors, in Carshalton.

In 1949, his father obtained employment in the credit control office of Thorn Electrical Industries, Enfield, and the family moved in with other relatives in Waltham Cross, Hertfordshire, where he attended Kings Road Junior Mixed Infants School, until a three-bedroom council house in nearby Cheshunt was allocated to them in 1950, at 12 Hargreaves Close.

He then attended Cheshunt Secondary Modern School from 1952 to 1957. As a member of the top stream, he stayed on beyond the minimum leaving age to take GCE Ordinary Level examinations and gained a pass in English literature. He then started work as a filing clerk for Atlas Lamps.

Harry Webb became interested in skiffle. When he was 16, his father bought him a guitar, and in 1957, he formed the school vocal harmony group The Quintones, before singing in the Dick Teague Skiffle Group.

=== 1958–1963: Success and stardom ===
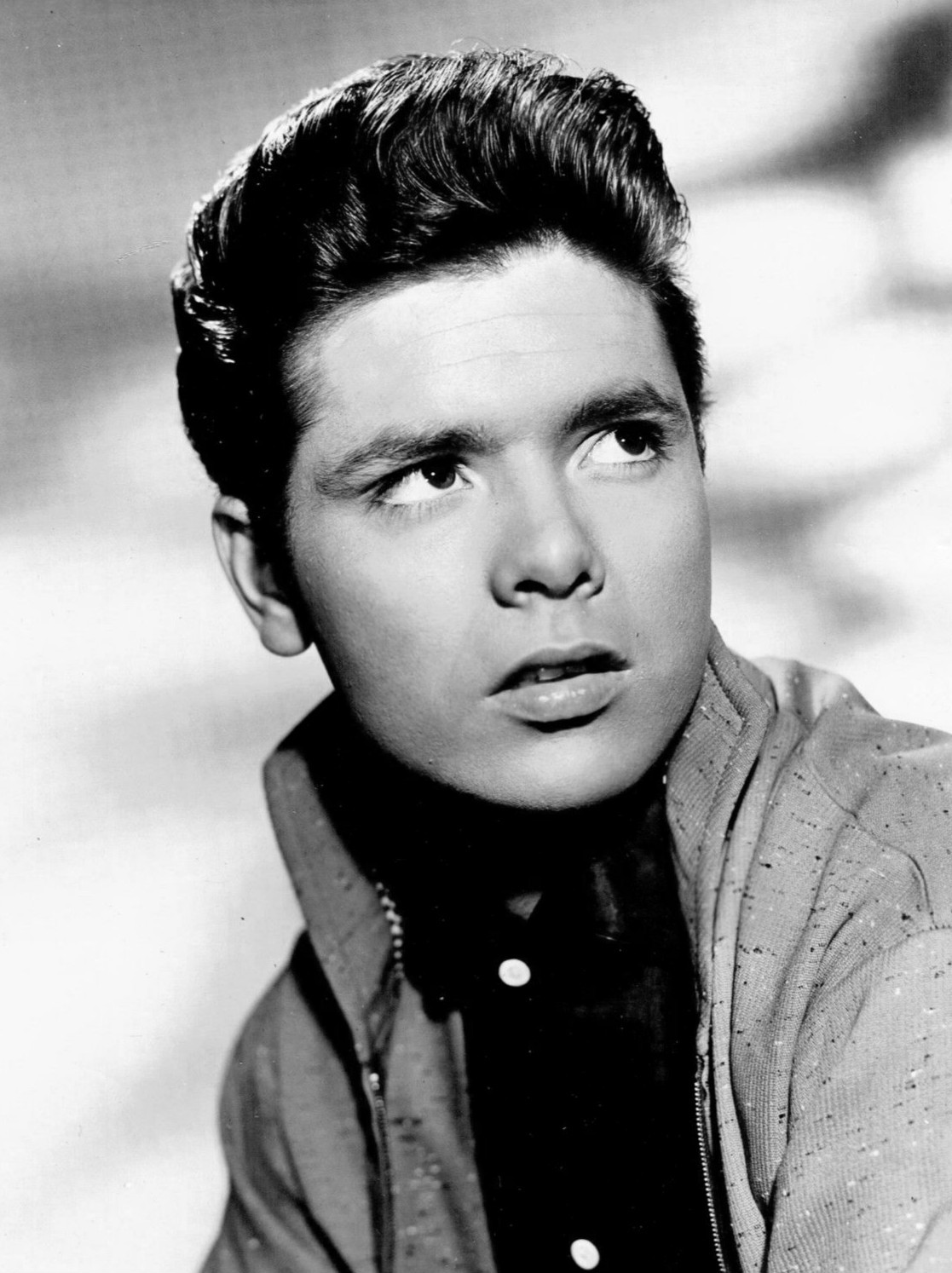
Richard in 1960

Harry Webb became lead singer of a rock and roll group, the Drifters (distinct from the US group of the same name). The 1950s entrepreneur Harry Greatorex wanted the up-and-coming rock 'n' roll singer to change his name. The name Cliff was adopted as it sounded like "cliff face", which suggested "Rock". It was "Move It" writer Ian Samwell who suggested the surname "Richard" as a tribute to Webb's musical hero Little Richard.

Before their first big appearance, at the Regal Ballroom in Ripley, Derbyshire in 1958, they adopted the name "Cliff Richard and the Drifters". The four members were Harry Webb (by then going under the stage name "Cliff Richard"), Ian Samwell on guitar, Terry Smart on drums and Norman Mitham on guitar. None of the other three played with the later and better known Shadows, although Samwell wrote songs for Richard's later career. Agent George Ganjou saw the group perform in London, and recommended them to Norrie Paramor for an audition.

For Richard's debut session, Paramor provided him with "Schoolboy Crush", a song previously recorded by American Bobby Helms. Richard was permitted to record one of his own songs for the B-side; this was "Move It", written and composed by the Drifters' Samwell while he was on board a number 715 Green Line bus on the way to Richard's house for a rehearsal. For the "Move It" session, Paramor used the session guitarist Ernie Shears on lead guitar and Frank Clark on bass.

There are various stories about why the A-side was replaced by the intended B-side. One is that Norrie Paramor's young daughter raved about the B-side; another was that influential TV producer Jack Good, who used the act for his TV show Oh Boy!, wanted the only song on his show to be "Move It" as opposed to "Schoolboy Crush". Richard was quoted as saying:

It's wonderful to be going on TV for the first time, but I feel so nervous that I don't know what to do. I shaved my sideburns off last night... Jack Good said it would make me look more original.

— NME, September 1958

The single went to No. 2 on the UK singles chart. John Lennon credited "Move It" as being the first British rock record.

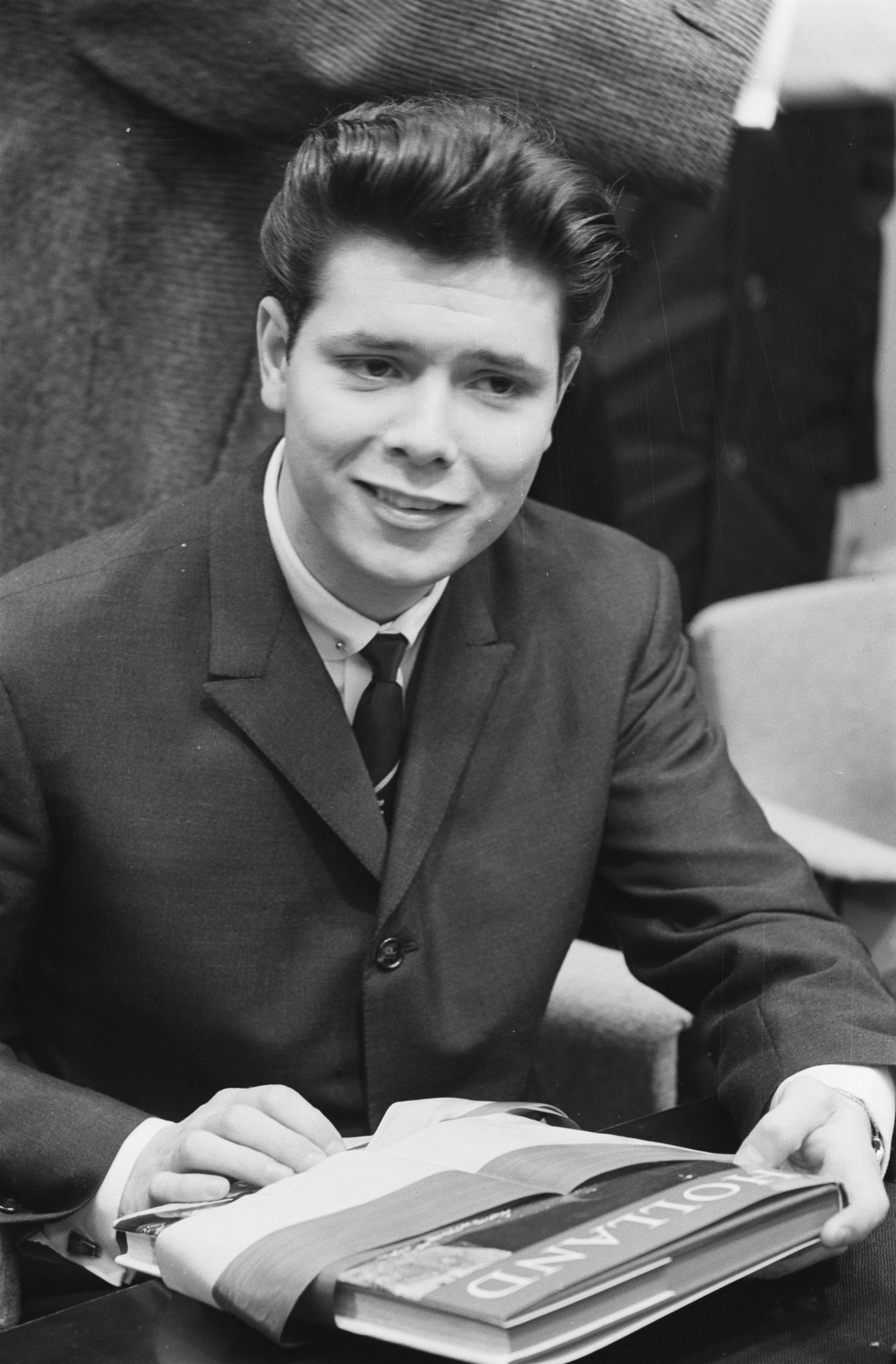
Richard at a press conference in the Netherlands in 1962

In the early days, Richard was marketed as the British equivalent of Elvis. Like previous British rockers such as Tommy Steele and Marty Wilde, Richard adopted Elvis-like dress and hairstyle. In performance he struck a pose of rock attitude, rarely smiling or looking at the audience or camera. His late 1958 and early 1959 follow-up singles, "High Class Baby" and "Livin' Lovin' Doll", were followed by "Mean Streak", which carried a rocker's sense of speed and passion, and Lionel Bart's "Living Doll".

It was on "Living Doll" that the Drifters began to back Richard on record. It was his fifth record and became his first No. 1 single. By that time, the group's line-up had changed with the arrival of Jet Harris, Tony Meehan, Hank Marvin and Bruce Welch. The group was obliged to change its name to "The Shadows" after legal complications with the American group the Drifters as "Living Doll" entered the American top 40, licensed by ABC-Paramount. "Living Doll" was used in Richard's début film Serious Charge, but it was arranged as a country standard, rather than a rock and roll standard.

The Shadows were not a typical backing group. They became contractually separate from Richard, and the group received no royalties for records backing Richard. In 1959, the Shadows (then still the Drifters) landed an EMI recording contract of their own, for independent recordings. That year, they released three singles, two of which featured double-sided vocals and one of which had instrumental A and B sides. They had several hits, including five UK No. 1s. The band also continued to appear and record with Richard and wrote many of his hits. On more than one occasion, a Shadows instrumental replaced a Richard song at the top of the British charts.

Richard's fifth single "Living Doll" triggered a softer, more relaxed, sound. Subsequent hits, the No. 1s "Travellin' Light" and "I Love You" and also "A Voice in the Wilderness", lifted from his film Expresso Bongo, and "Theme for a Dream" cemented Richard's status as a mainstream pop entertainer along with contemporaries such as Adam Faith and Billy Fury. Throughout the early 1960s, his hits were consistently in the top five.

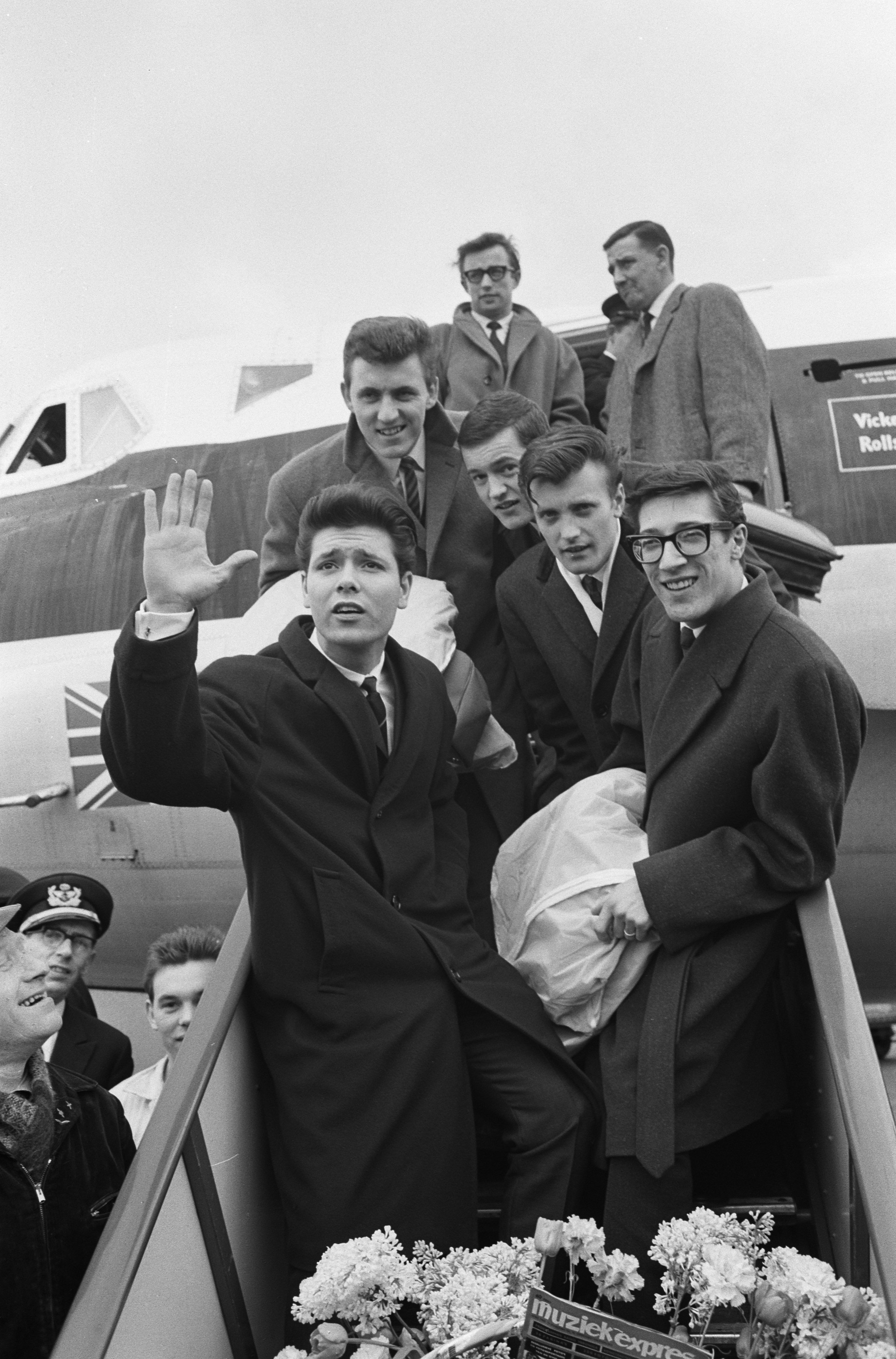
Richard with the Shadows in 1962

In 1961, EMI records organised Richard's 21st birthday party at its London headquarters in Manchester Square led by his producer Norrie Paramor. Photographs of the celebrations were incorporated into Richard's next album, 21 Today, in which Tony Meehan joined in despite having very recently left the Shadows to be replaced by Brian Bennett.

Typically, the Shadows closed the first half of the show with a 30-minute set of their own, then backed Richard on his show-closing 45-minute stint, as exemplified by the retrospective CD album release of Live at the ABC Kingston 1962. Tony Meehan and Jet Harris left the group in 1961 and 1962, respectively, and had chart successes for Decca. The Shadows added bass players Brian Locking (1962–63) and then John Rostill (1963–68) and took on Brian Bennett permanently on drums.

In the early years, particularly on album and EP releases, Richard also recorded ballads backed by the Norrie Paramor Orchestra with Tony Meehan (and later Brian Bennett) as a session drummer. His first such single without the Shadows was "When the Girl in Your Arms Is the Girl in Your Heart" in 1961, and he continued to release one or two per year, including covers of "It's All in the Game" in 1963 and "Constantly" in 1964, a revival of the popular Italian hit "L'edera". In 1965, sessions under the direction of Billy Sherrill in Nashville, Tennessee were particularly successful, yielding "The Minute You're Gone", which topped the UK singles chart, and "Wind Me Up (Let Me Go)", which made No. 2.

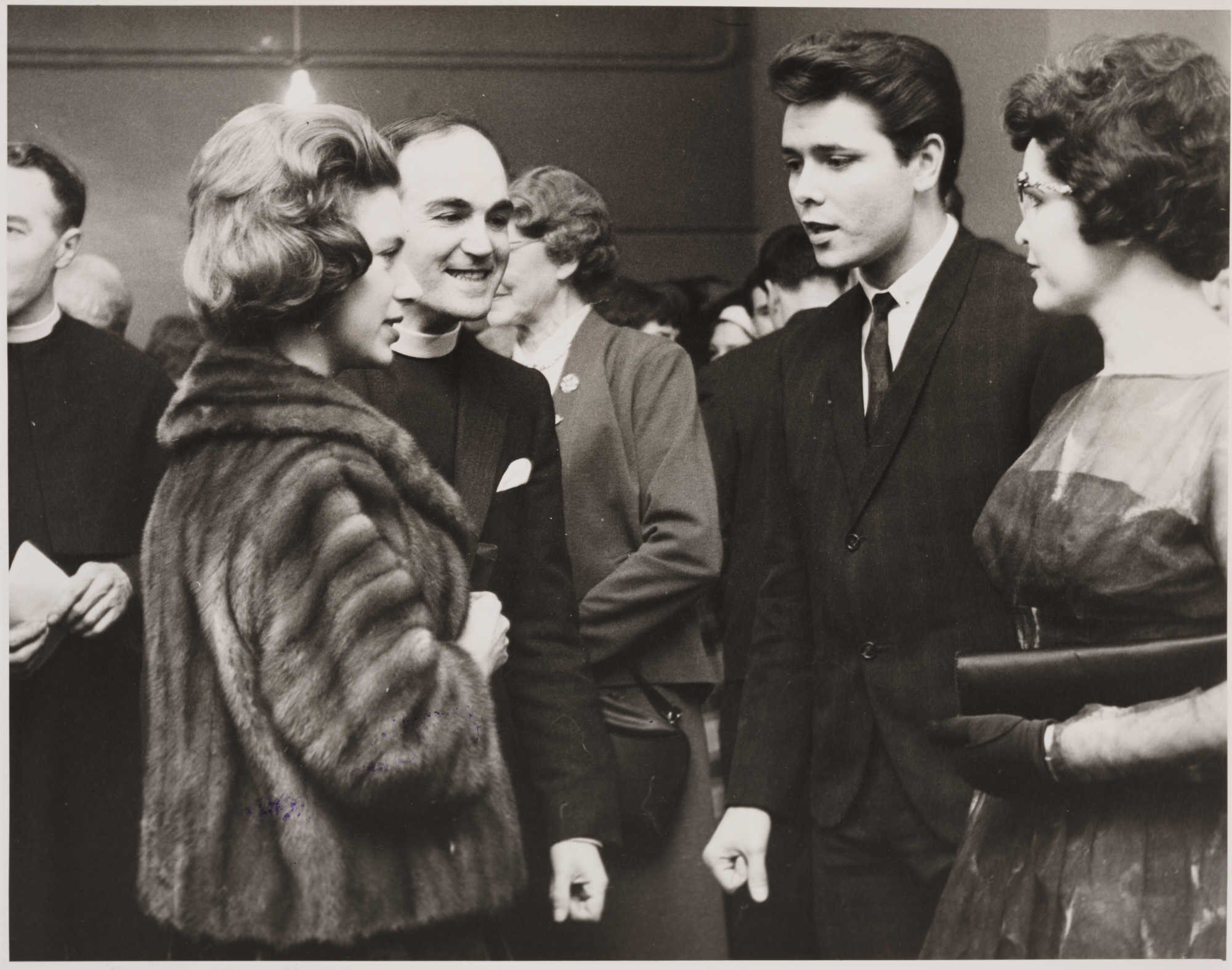
Princess Margaret (left) and Richard at the 59 Club, London in 1962

Richard, and the Shadows in particular, however, never achieved star status in the United States. In 1960 they toured the United States and were well received, but lacklustre support and distribution from a revolving door of American record labels proved an obstacle to long-term success there, despite several chart records by Richard, including the aforementioned "It's All in the Game" on Epic, via a renewed linking of the worldwide Columbia labels after Philips ended its distribution deal with CBS. To the Shadows' chagrin, "Apache" reached No. 2 in the US through a cover version by Danish guitarist Jorgen Ingmann which was almost unchanged from their worldwide hit. Richard and the band appeared on The Ed Sullivan Show, which was crucial for the Beatles, but these performances did not help them gain sustained success in North America.

Richard and the Shadows appeared in six feature films, including a debut in the 1959 film Serious Charge but most notably in The Young Ones, Summer Holiday, Wonderful Life and Finders Keepers. These films created their own genre, known as the "Cliff Richard musical", and led to Richard's being named the No. 1 cinema box office attraction in Britain for both 1962 and 1963, even beating the James Bond films. The title song of The Young Ones became his biggest-selling single in the United Kingdom, selling over one million copies in the UK. The irreverent 1980s TV sitcom The Young Ones took its name from Richard's 1962 film. In mid-1963, Cliff and the Shadows appeared for a season in Blackpool, where Richard had his portrait modelled by Victor Heyfron.

=== 1964–1975: Changing circumstances ===
As with the other contemporary rock acts in Britain, Richard's career was affected by the advent of the Beatles and the Mersey sound in 1963 and 1964. He continued to be popular and have hits in the charts throughout the 1960s, though not at the level that he had enjoyed before. Nor did doors open to him in the US market; he was not considered part of the British Invasion, and despite four Hot 100 hits (including the top 25 "It's All in the Game") between August 1963 and August 1964, the American public had little awareness of him.

Although baptised as an Anglican, Richard did not practise the faith in his early years. In 1964, he became an active evangelical Christian and his faith is an important aspect of his life. Standing up publicly as an evangelical affected his career in several ways. Initially, he believed that he should quit rock 'n' roll, feeling he could no longer be the rocker who had been called a "crude exhibitionist" and "too sexy for TV". Richard intended at first to "reform his ways" and become a teacher, but evangelical Christian friends advised him not to abandon his career. Soon after, Richard re-emerged, performing with Christian groups and recording some overtly Christian material. He still recorded secular songs with the Shadows but devoted a lot of his time to Christian-based work, including appearances with the Billy Graham crusades. Over time, Richard balanced his faith and work, enabling him to remain one of the most popular singers in Britain as well as one of its best-known evangelical Christians.

Richard's 1965 UK No. 12 hit "On My Word" ended a run of 23 consecutive top ten UK hits between "A Voice in the Wilderness" in 1960 to "The Minute You're Gone" in 1965, which, to date, is still a record number of consecutive top ten UK hits for a male artist. Richard continued having international hits, including 1967's "The Day I Met Marie", which reached No. 10 in the UK Singles Chart and No. 5 in the Australian charts.

Richard acted in the 1967 film Two a Penny, released by Billy Graham's World Wide Pictures, in which he played Jamie Hopkins, a young man who gets involved in drug dealing while questioning his life after his girlfriend changes her attitude. He released the live album Cliff in Japan in 1967.

In 1968, Richard sang the UK's entry in the Eurovision Song Contest, "Congratulations", written by Bill Martin and Phil Coulter; it finished second, however, by one point to Spain's "La La La" by Massiel. According to John Kennedy O'Connor's The Eurovision Song Contest—The Official History, this was the closest result yet in the contest, and Richard locked himself in the toilet to avoid the nerves of the voting. Nevertheless, "Congratulations" was a big hit throughout Europe and in Australia and another UK No. 1 in April 1968.

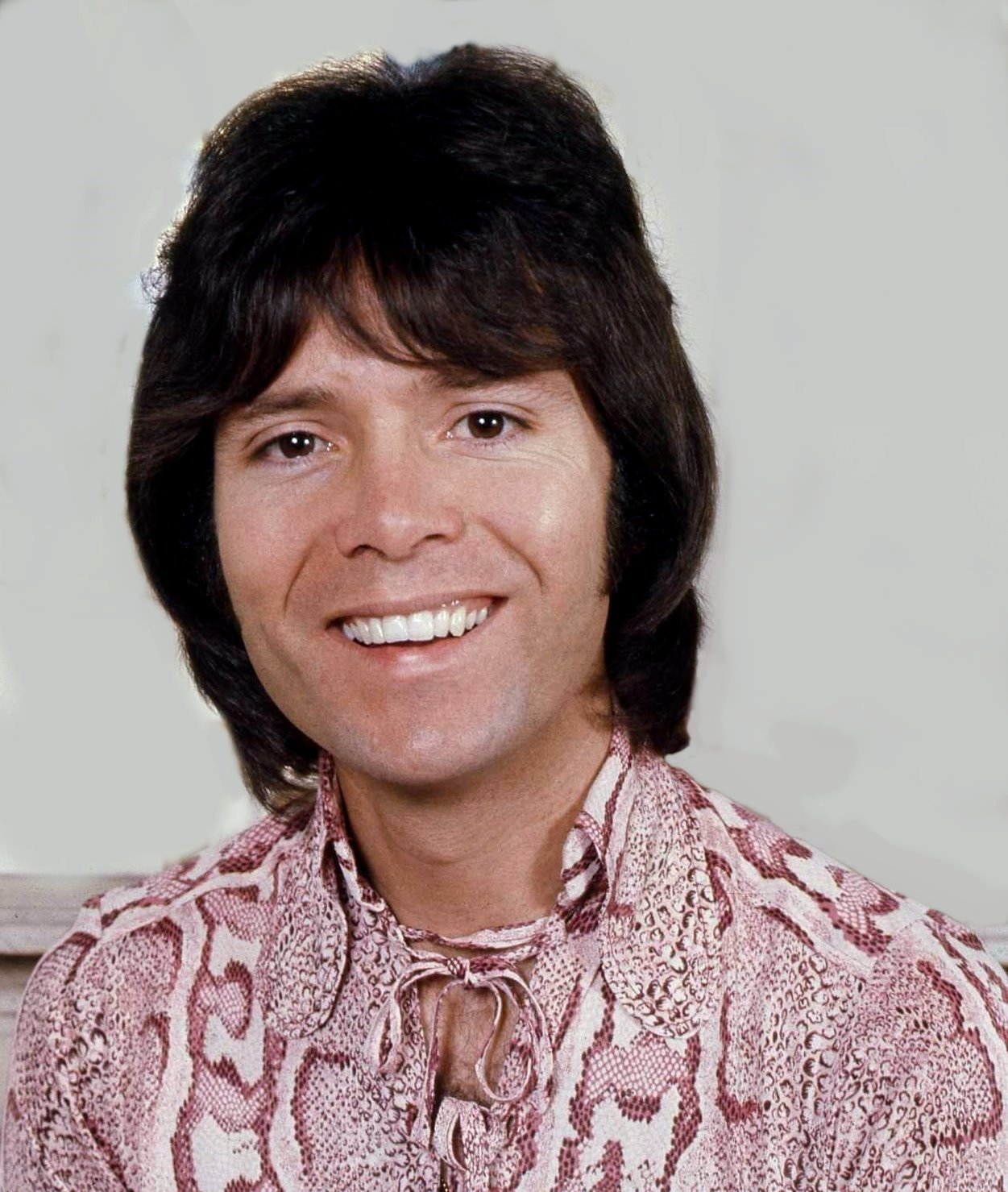
Portrait of Richard by Allan Warren (1973)

After the Shadows disbanded in 1968, Richard continued to record. During the 1970s, he took part in several television shows and hosted his own show, It's Cliff Richard, from 1970 to 1976. It starred Olivia Newton-John, Hank Marvin and Una Stubbs and included "A Song for Europe". He began 1970 by appearing live on the BBC's review of the sixties music scene, Pop Go The Sixties, which was broadcast across Britain and Europe on 31 December 1969. He performed "Bachelor Boy" with the Shadows and "Congratulations" solo. In 1972, he made a short BBC television comedy film called The Case with appearances from comedians and his first ever duets with a woman — Olivia Newton-John. He went on to release a double live album, Cliff Live in Japan 1972, which featured Newton-John.

His final film acting role was in the 1973 British film Take Me High.

In 1973, he sang the British Eurovision entry "Power to All Our Friends", the song finished third close behind Luxembourg's "Tu te reconnaîtras" by Anne-Marie David and Spain's "Eres tú" by Mocedades. This time, Richard took Valium to overcome his nerves and his manager was almost unable to wake him for the performance. Richard also hosted the BBC's qualifying heat for the Eurovision Song Contest, A Song for Europe, in 1970, 1971 and 1972 as part of his BBCTV variety series. He also presented the Eurovision Song Contest Previews for the BBC in 1971 and 1972.

In 1975, he released the single "Honky Tonk Angel", produced by Hank Marvin and John Farrar, oblivious to its connotations or hidden meanings. As soon as he was notified that a "honky-tonk angel" was southern US slang for a prostitute, the horrified Richard ordered EMI to withdraw it and refused to promote it despite having made a video for it. EMI agreed to his demand despite the fact that the single was expected to sell well. About 1,000 copies are known to exist on vinyl.

=== 1976–1994: Renaissance ===
In 1976, the decision was made to repackage Richard as a rock performer. That year, Bruce Welch relaunched Cliff's career and produced the landmark album I'm Nearly Famous, which included the successful but controversial guitar-driven track "Devil Woman", which became Richard's first true hit in the United States, and the ballad "Miss You Nights". In reviewing the new album in Melody Maker, Geoff Brown heralded it the renaissance of Richard. Richard's fans were excited about this revival of a performer who had been a part of British rock from its early days. Many big names in music such as Jimmy Page, Eric Clapton and Elton John were seen sporting I'm Nearly Famous badges, pleased that their boyhood idol was getting back into the heavier rock in which he had begun his career.

Notwithstanding this, Richard continued to release albums with contemporary Christian music content in parallel with his rock and pop albums, for example: Small Corners from 1978 contained the single "Yes He Lives". On 31 December 1976, he performed his latest single, "Hey, Mr. Dream Maker", on BBC1's A Jubilee of Music, celebrating British pop music for Queen Elizabeth II's impending Silver Jubilee.

In 1979, Richard teamed up again with producer Bruce Welch for the pop single "We Don't Talk Anymore", written by Alan Tarney, which hit No. 1 in the UK and No. 7 in the US. Bryan Ferry added hummed backing vocals to the song. The record made Richard the first act to reach the Hot 100's top 40 in the 1980s who had also been there in each of the three previous decades. The song was quickly added onto the end of his latest album Rock 'n' Roll Juvenile, which was re-titled We Don't Talk Anymore for its release in the United States. It was his first time at the top of the UK singles chart in over ten years, and the song would become his biggest-selling single worldwide, selling almost five million copies throughout the world. Later in 1979, Richard performed with Kate Bush at the London Symphony Orchestra's 75th anniversary celebration at the Royal Albert Hall.

With "We Don't Talk Anymore" in 1979, Richard finally began to receive some extended success in the United States to follow on from the success of "Devil Woman" in 1976. In 1980, "Carrie" broke into the US top 40, followed by "Dreamin'", which reached No. 10. His 1980 duet "Suddenly" with Olivia Newton-John, from the film Xanadu, peaked at No. 20, followed by "A Little in Love" (No. 17) and "Daddy's Home" (No. 23) in 1981. After many years of limited success in the US, three of his singles simultaneously charted on the last Hot 100 of 1980 ("A Little in Love", "Dreamin'" and "Suddenly").

In the UK, meanwhile, "Carrie" reached No. 4 and "Dreamin'" peaked at No. 8. In a retrospective review of "Carrie", AllMusic journalist Dave Thompson praised "Carrie" as being "an enthrallingly atmospheric number. One of the most electrifying of all Cliff Richard's recordings."

In 1980, Richard officially changed his name, by deed poll, from Harry Rodger Webb to Cliff Richard. At the same time, he received, from the Queen, the award of Officer of the Order of the British Empire for services to music and charity.

In 1981, the single "Wired for Sound" reached No. 4 in the UK and also became Richard's biggest hit in Australia since the early 1960s. To finish the year, "Daddy's Home" reached No. 2 in the UK. On the singles chart, Richard was having his most consistent period of top twenty hits since the mid-1960s. He also was amassing a string of top ten albums, including I'm No Hero, Wired for Sound, Now You See Me, Now You Don't, a live album he recorded with the Royal Philharmonic Orchestra titled Dressed for the Occasion, and Silver, marking his 25th year in show business in 1983.

In 1986, Richard reached No. 1 by teaming up with the cast of the comedy series The Young Ones to re-record "Living Doll" for the charity Comic Relief. Along with the song, the recording contained comedy dialogue between Richard and the Young Ones. That same year, Richard opened in the West End as a rock musician called upon to defend Earth in a trial set in the Andromeda Galaxy in the multi-media Dave Clark musical Time. Three Richard singles, "She's So Beautiful", which reached No. 17 in the UK, "It's in Every One of Us" and "Born To Rock 'n Roll", were released over 1985 and 1986 from the concept album recorded for Time.

In August 1986, Richard was involved in a five-car crash in torrential rain on the M4 motorway in West London. Richard's car was a write-off, as another car swerved and braked hard. Richard hurt his back in the accident, but was not seriously injured. Police called for a cab from the accident scene so that he was able to perform that night in the Time musical. After the show, Richard said: "I'm lucky to be here". He said that his seatbelt had prevented him from flying through the windscreen.

In October 1986, "All I Ask of You", a duet that Richard recorded with Sarah Brightman from the Andrew Lloyd Webber musical version of The Phantom of the Opera reached No. 3 in the UK singles chart. 1987 saw the release of his Always Guaranteed album, which became his best-selling album of all-new material, and included the two top-10 hit singles "My Pretty One" and "Some People".

Richard concluded his thirtieth year in music by achieving a UK Christmas No. 1 single in 1988 with "Mistletoe and Wine", while simultaneously holding the No. 1 positions on the album and video charts with the compilation Private Collection, which collected his biggest hits from 1979 to 1988. "Mistletoe and Wine" was Richard's 99th UK single and spent four weeks at the top of the chart. It was the best-selling UK single of 1988, shifting 750,000 copies. The album was certified quadruple platinum, becoming Richard's first to be certified multi-platinum by the BPI since it had introduced multi-platinum awards in February 1987.

In May 1989, Richard released his 100th single, "The Best of Me", becoming the first British artist to achieve the feat. The single peaked at No. 2 in the UK. It was also the lead single from the UK top ten album Stronger. Released along with the singles "I Just Don't Have the Heart" (UK No. 3), "Lean On You" (No. 17) and "Stronger Than That" (No. 14), the album become Richard's first studio album to amass four UK top twenty hits.

In 1989, Richard received the Brit Awards honour for "Outstanding Contribution". In June that year, he played London's Wembley Stadium for two nights with a spectacular titled The Event in front of a combined audience of 144,000 people.

On 30 June 1990, Richard performed to an estimated 120,000 people at England's Knebworth Park as part of an all-star concert line-up that also included Paul McCartney, Phil Collins, Elton John and Tears for Fears. The concert in aid of charity was televised around the world and helped to raise $10.5 million for disabled children and young musicians.

Later in 1990, a live album titled From a Distance: The Event was released. It compiled highlights of the previous year's The Event show, and provided two live tracks as singles, "Silhouettes" (UK No. 10) and "From a Distance" (No. 11). However, it was with the Christmas single "Saviour's Day" that Richard scored his 13th UK No. 1 single and his 100th top 40 hit. The album itself reached No. 3 over the Christmas period and was certified double platinum by the BPI.

Following the success of the recent Christmas singles, Richard released his first Christmas album, Together with Cliff Richard, in 1991, but his bid for the UK Christmas No. 1 spot again with "We Should Be Together" was unsuccessful (making No. 10). 1992 saw "I Still Believe in You" (No. 7) released as his Christmas single, while 1993 saw Richard's first new music studio album for over three years released. Simply titled The Album, it debuted at No. 1 on the UK album chart. "Peace in Our Time" (No. 8) was the second single, followed by "Human Work of Art" (No. 24) and "Healing Love" (No. 19) for Christmas. In 1994, the compilation The Hit List was released; meanwhile in the background, Richard was concentrating on bringing the musical Heathcliff to the stage.

With Richard's succession of hit songs and albums from the late 1970s into the early 1980s, followed by another strong run in the late 1980s and early 1990s, a strong fan base had been reestablished and Richard remained one of the best-known music artists in the country. Over the course of the 1980s, he recorded with Olivia Newton-John, Elton John, Stevie Wonder, Phil Everly, Janet Jackson, Sheila Walsh and Van Morrison. Meanwhile, the Shadows later re-formed (and again split). They recorded on their own, but also reunited with Richard in 1978, 1984 and 1989–90.

=== 1995–2007: Knighthood ===
On 17 June 1995, Richard was appointed a Knight Bachelor (invested on 25 October 1995), becoming the first rock star to be so honoured. In 1996, he led the Wimbledon Centre Court crowd in singing during a rain delay when asked by Wimbledon officials to entertain the crowd. In the late 1990s, Richard and former EMI UK managing director Clive Black established the record label Blacknight. In 1998, Richard demonstrated that radio stations were refusing to play his music when he released a dance remix of his forthcoming single "Can't Keep This Feeling In" on a white label record using the alias Blacknight. The single was featured on playlists until the artist's identity was revealed. Richard then released the single under his own name as the lead single for his album Real as I Wanna Be, with each reaching No. 10 in the UK on their respective charts.

In 1999, controversy again arose regarding radio stations refusing to play his releases when EMI, Richard's label since 1958, refused to release his song, "The Millennium Prayer", having judged that the song did not have commercial potential. Richard took it to an independent label, Papillon, which released the charity recording (in aid of Children's Promise). The single went on to top the UK chart for three weeks, becoming his fourteenth and, as of December 2022, most recent No. 1 single.

Richard's next album, in 2001, was Wanted, followed by another top ten album, Cliff at Christmas. The holiday album contained both new and older recordings, including the single "Santa's List", which reached No. 5 in 2003. Richard went to Nashville, Tennessee for his next album project in 2004, employing a writers' conclave to give him the pick of all new songs for the album Something's Goin' On. It was another top 10 album, and produced three UK top 20 singles: "Something's Goin' On", "I Cannot Give You My Love", with Barry Gibb of the Bee Gees, and "What Car".

Richard performing in London during the 50th anniversary tour in 2008

On 14 June 2004, Richard joined the Shadows on-stage at the London Palladium. The Shadows had decided to re-form for another tour of the UK. It was not to be their last tour together, however, as they would re-form once again for a final tour five years later, in 2009.

Two's Company, an album of duets released in 2006, was another top 10 success for Richard and included newly recorded material with Brian May, Dionne Warwick, Anne Murray, Barry Gibb and Daniel O'Donnell, plus some previously recorded duets with artists such as Phil Everly, Elton John and Olivia Newton-John. Two's Company was released to coincide with the UK leg of his latest world tour, Here and Now, which included lesser known songs such as "My Kinda Life", "How Did She Get Here", "Hey Mr. Dream Maker", "For Life", "A Matter of Moments", "When The Girl in Your Arms" and the Christmas single "21st Century Christmas", which debuted at No. 2 on the UK singles chart.

Another compilation album, Love... The Album was released on 12 November 2007. Like Two's Company before it, this album includes both previously released material and newly recorded songs, namely "Waiting for a Girl Like You", "When You Say Nothing at All", "All Out of Love", "If You're Not the One" and "When I Need You" (the last was released as a single, reaching No. 38; the album peaked at No. 13).

=== 2008–present: 50th anniversary and Shadows reunion ===
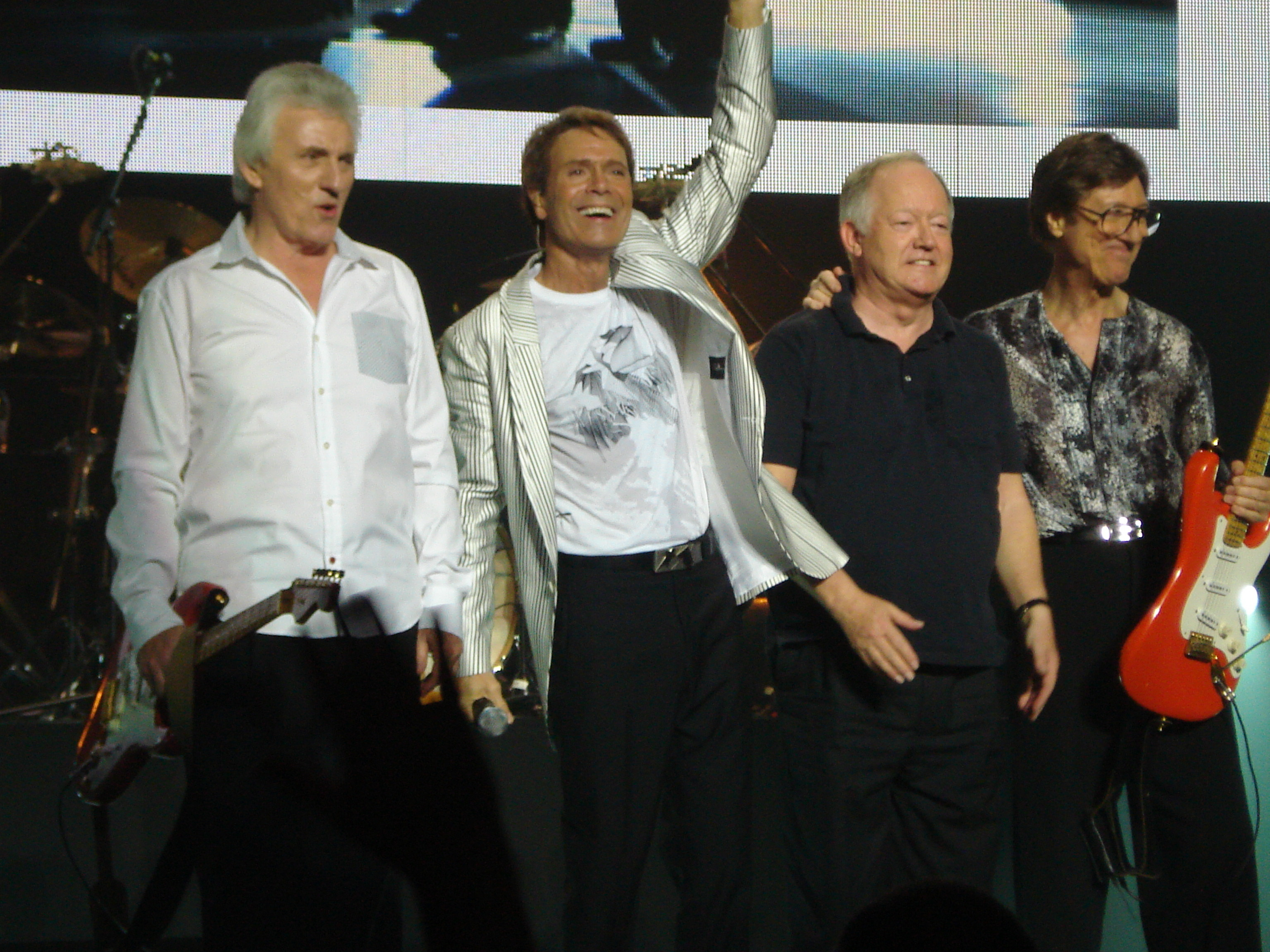
L–R: Bruce Welch, Richard, Brian Bennett and Hank Marvin, 2009

In 2008, Richard's 51st year in the music business, the eight-CD box set And They Said It Wouldn't Last (My 50 Years in Music) was released. In September, a single celebrating his 50 years in pop music, "Thank You for a Lifetime", was released. On 14 September 2008 it reached No. 3 on the UK music charts.

On 11 November 2008, Richard's official website announced that he and the Shadows would reunite to celebrate their 50th anniversary in the music business. A month later they performed at the Royal Variety Performance. In 2009, they brought their partnership to an end with the golden anniversary concert tour of the UK.

A new album, titled Reunited, by Richard and the Shadows, was released in September 2009. It was their first studio project in 40 years. The 28 tracks recorded comprise 25 re-recordings of their earlier work, with three "new" tracks, originally from that era (and earlier), the single "Singing the Blues", along with Eddie Cochran's "C'mon Everybody" and the Frankie Ford hit "Sea Cruise". The album charted at No. 6 in the UK charts in its opening week and peaked at No. 4. The reunion tour continued into Europe in 2010. In June 2009, it was reported by Sound Kitchen Studios in Nashville that Richard was to return there shortly to record a new album of original recordings of jazz songs. He was to record fourteen tracks in a week.

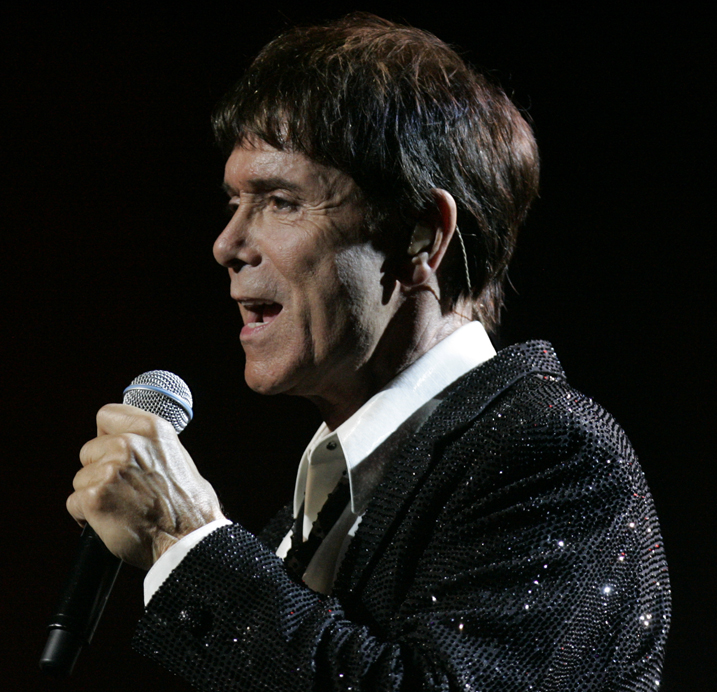
Richard performing at the State Theatre, Sydney, in 2013

Richard performed "Congratulations" at the 70th birthday celebrations of Queen Margrethe II in Denmark on 13 April 2010. On 14 October 2010, Richard celebrated his 70th birthday, and to mark the occasion, he performed a series of six concerts at the Royal Albert Hall, London. To accompany the concerts, a new album of cover versions of swing standards, Bold as Brass, was released on 11 October. The official party celebrating Richard's 70th birthday was held on 23 October 2010, with guests including Cilla Black, Elaine Paige and Daniel O'Donnell.

After a week of promotion, Richard flew out to rehearse for the German Night of the Proms concerts in Belgium at the end of October. He made a surprise appearance at the Antwerp concert of the Night of the Proms on Thursday, 28 October 2010 and sang "We Don't Talk Anymore" to a great reaction from the surprised 20,000 fans at Sportpaleis Antwerp. In all, he toured 12 German cities in November and December 2010, during the Night of the Proms concerts, as the headline act. The total of 18 concerts were attended by over 300,000 fans. Richard performed a selection of hits and tracks from the Bold As Brass album. In November 2010, he achieved his third consecutive UK No. 1 music DVD in three years with the DVD release of Bold as Brass.

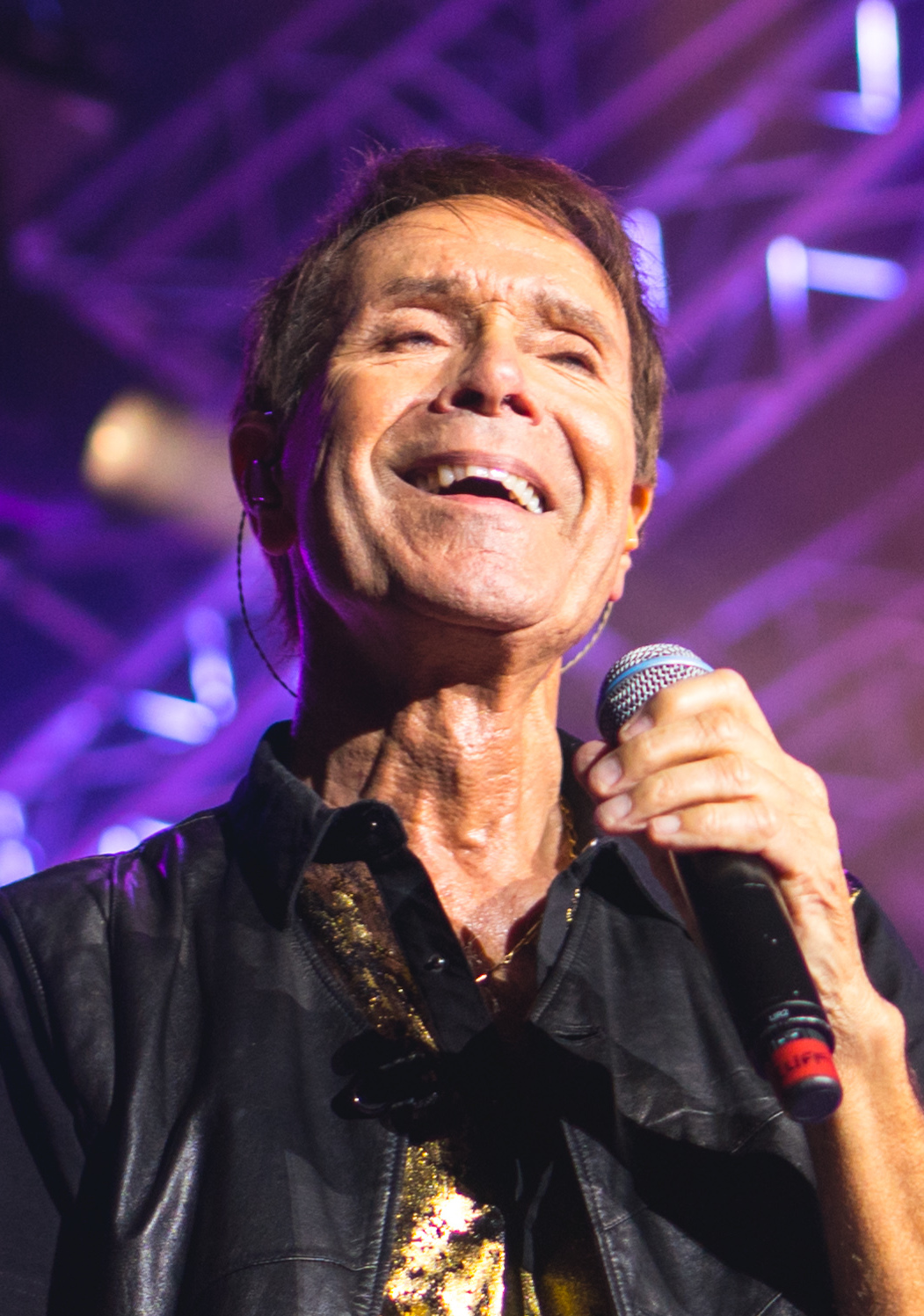
Richard performing in 2017

In October 2011, Richard released his Soulicious album, containing duets with American soul singers including Percy Sledge, Ashford and Simpson, Roberta Flack, Freda Payne and Candi Staton. The album was produced by Lamont Dozier and was supported by a short UK arena tour. Soulicious became Richard's 41st top 10 UK hit album.

He was among the performers at the Diamond Jubilee concert held outside Buckingham Palace in June 2012. On 30 June 2012, Richard helped to carry the Olympic torch from Derby to Birmingham as part of the torch relay for the 2012 Summer Olympics in London. Richard said that his run with the Olympic torch would be one of his top 10 memories.

Richard was involved in a campaign to extend copyright on sound recordings in the UK from 50 to 95 years, and extend the number of years on which a musician can receive royalties. The campaign was initially unsuccessful, and the UK copyright on many of Richard's early recordings expired in 2008. In 2013, following another campaign, copyright on sound recordings was extended to 70 years after first publication to the public for works still in copyright at that point. This means Richard's recordings between 1958 and 1962 are out of copyright in the UK, but those from 1963 will be in copyright until 2034. In November 2013, Richard released the 100th album of his career, The Fabulous Rock 'n' Roll Songbook. By that point, Richard had released 47 studio albums, 35 compilations, 11 live albums and 7 film soundtracks.

Richard was scheduled to open for Morrissey at a live concert at New York's 19,000-capacity Barclays Center on 21 June 2014. Morrissey said that he was "honoured and thrilled" to have Richard on the bill. On 16 June 2014 Morrissey cancelled the concert after collapsing with an "acute fever". Richard announced that he would stage a free show for fans in New York on the same night the cancelled concert was due to take place.

In October 2015, Richard performed on tour to mark his 75th birthday. He took to the stage across seven cities in the UK, including six nights at London's Royal Albert Hall, where he has performed on over 100 occasions during his career. Richard's 2015 tour received a positive review from The Guardian's rock music critic Dave Simpson.

In October 2017, Richard performed in Tel Aviv and took part in a charity tennis event in Herzliya in aid of the Freddie Krivine Foundation, which promotes Jewish–Arab coexistence by providing tennis coaching and mixed activities for Arab and Jewish children in Israel.

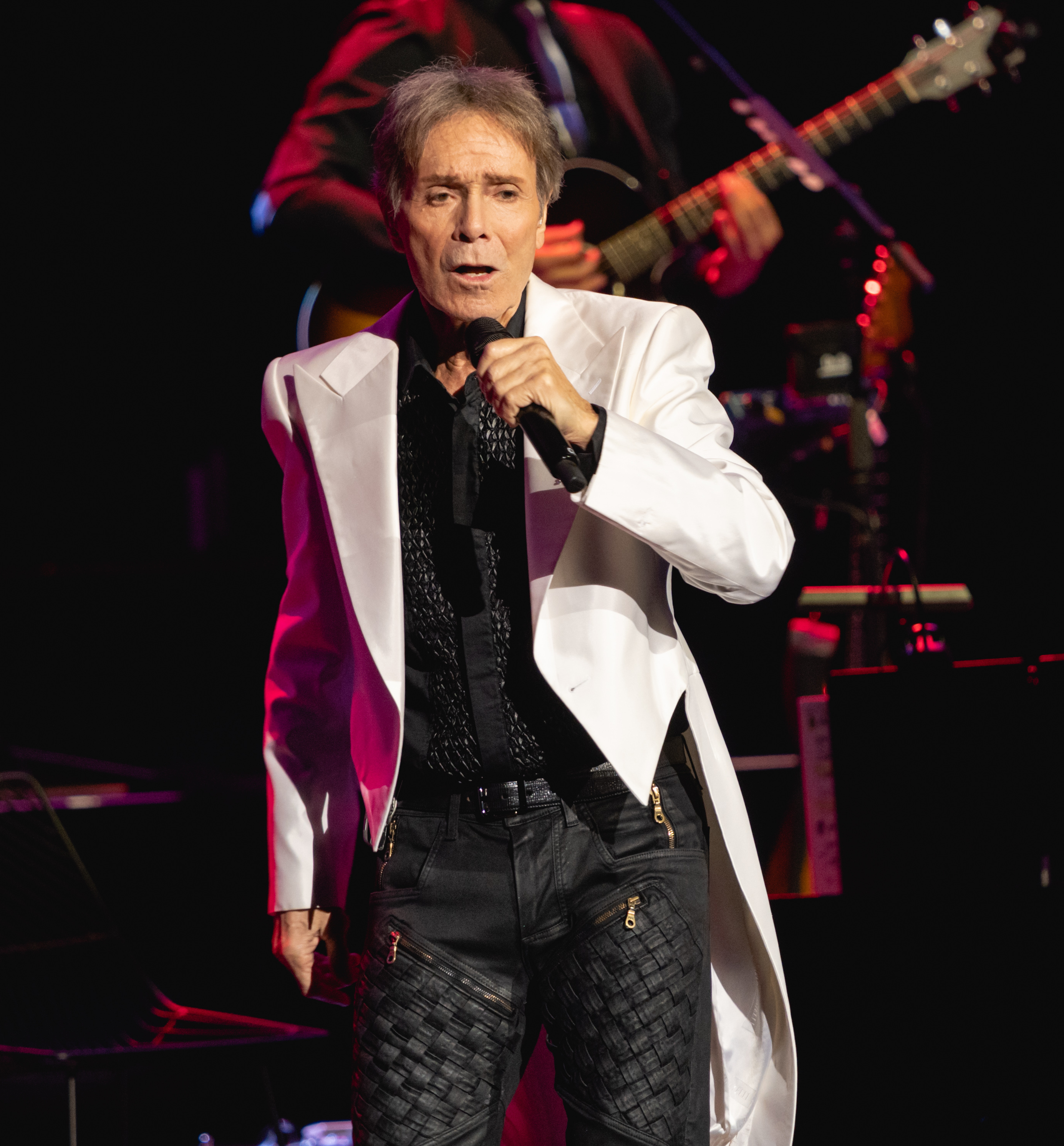
Richard performing in 2021

In August 2018, Richard announced the release of the album Rise Up, which includes new material. The first single of the album, "Rise Up", was released in vinyl format and reached No. 1 on the UK Vinyl Singles Chart in October 2018. He performed a duet with Welsh singer Bonnie Tyler on "Taking Control", which appeared on her 2019 studio album, Between the Earth and the Stars. In 2020 Richard released the album Music... The Air That I Breathe. On 4 July 2022, Richard sang his 1963 hit "Summer Holiday" at the 2022 Wimbledon Championships, as part of the Centenary Celebration.

== Criticism of the music industry and commercial support ==
Richard has openly complained about the lack of commercial support he receives from radio stations and record labels. He spoke about this on The Alan Titchmarsh Show on ITV in December 2007, pointing out that while new bands needed airplay for promotion and sales, long-established artists such as himself also relied upon airplay for the same reasons. He also noted that 1980s radio stations did play his records and that this went some way to help sales and maintain his media presence. In the BBC Radio 2 documentary Cliff – Take Another Look, he pointed out that many documentaries charting the history of British music (e.g. I'm in a Rock 'n' Roll Band!) fail to mention him (or the Shadows).

In 1998, Chris Evans, the then breakfast show host on Virgin Radio, vowed he would never again play a record by Richard, stating that he was "too old". In June 2004, British disc jockey Tony Blackburn was suspended from his radio job at Classic Gold Digital for playing records by Richard against station policy. The head of programmes, Paul Baker, sent an e-mail to Blackburn stating that Richard "doesn't match our brand values. He's not on the playlist, and you must stop playing him." On Blackburn's next morning breakfast show, he read a print-out of the e-mail live on air to the show's 400,000 listeners and went on to play two songs by Richard. Classic Gold managing director John Baish later confirmed Blackburn's suspension from the show.

In 2011, digital station Absolute Radio '60s, dedicated to playing popular music from the 1960s, announced they would not be playing any of Richard's records because they said they did not fit "the cool sound... we're trying to create". DJ Pete Mitchell said: "Timeless acts of the decade that remain relevant today are the Beatles, the Stones, the Doors and the Who, not Sir Cliff." Richard responded to this by saying: "They're lying to themselves, and more importantly they're lying to the public."

Richard has spoken of his irritation about other stars who are praised after taking drugs. In 2009, Richard said he was the "most radical rock-and-roll singer Britain has ever seen" as he did not indulge in drugs or sexual promiscuity. Richard said he is proud that he never adopted the hedonistic lifestyle of a typical rock star. He said: "I've never wanted to trash a hotel room."

Richard has criticised the music industry for encouraging artists to court controversy. In November 2013, he said: "The music industry has changed drastically and that damages young artists. This industry can be very destructive." Richard expressed concern about the sexually explicit public image of singer Miley Cyrus, following controversy surrounding a semi-naked video for her song "Wrecking Ball". In the 1970s, Richard said that he was disturbed by the visual imagery and mock horror of singer Alice Cooper. In 1997, Richard said of the rock band Oasis: "It's just a shame that part of what gives them their kick is their self-destructive impulse."

In an article for The Guardian in 2011, the journalist Sam Leith wrote of Richard's lack of commercial support among radio stations: "His uncompromising Christianity, his clean-living ways, and his connoisseurship of the fruits of his Portuguese winery have made him an object of incomprehension, even ridicule, for the uncultured, alcopop-drinking younger generation." Also writing in The Guardian, John Robb opined that because Richard has rebelled against the drink and drugs culture of typical rock stars, this "rebelling against rebellion" has made Richard something of a countercultural icon.

In December 2013, Richard said that he felt two of his singles, "Mistletoe and Wine" and "The Millennium Prayer", had created a negative reaction against him. He said: "Airplay is vital for single hits. The only way I can have a fair competition is if your records are on the radio. There is an ageism in the radio industry. If you ask me to record a new song, I'm not sure it would get the support it needs."

Author and rock music critic Tony Parsons said: "If you don't like at least some Cliff Richard, then you don't like pop music". Sting also defended Richard, stating: "Cliff Richard is in my opinion one of Britain's finest singers technically and emotionally."

== Personal life ==
Richard's father, Rodger Webb, died in 1961, aged 56, which greatly affected Richard. He later said: "My father died very young. He missed the best parts of my career. When my father was sick, we became very close." Richard's mother, Dorothy, died in October 2007, aged 87, after a decade with Alzheimer's disease. In a 2006 interview, he spoke about the difficulties he and his sisters had in dealing with their mother's condition.

Richard is a lifelong bachelor. In a three-page letter written in October 1961 to "his first serious girlfriend", Australian dancer Delia Wicks, which was made public in April 2010 after her death from cancer, Richard wrote, "Being a pop singer I have to give up one priceless thing—the right to any lasting relationship with any special girl. I've just had to make, probably, one of the biggest decisions I'm ever going to make and I'm hoping that it won't hurt you too much." The couple had been dating for 18 months. In the letter he goes on to say, "I couldn't give up my career, besides the fact that my mother and sisters, since my father's death, rely on me completely. I have showbiz in my blood now and I would be lost without it." Richard urged her to "find someone who is free to love you as you deserve to be loved" and who "is able to marry you".

After Delia Wicks died in 2010, aged 71, her brother Graham Wicks said that she had been "devastated" by Richard's decision to end their relationship, describing Richard as "a very pleasant man".

At the age of 22, a year after his relationship with Delia Wicks ended, Richard had a brief romance with the actress Una Stubbs. Later in the 1960s, Richard considered marriage to the dancer Jackie Irving. Richard described Irving as "utterly beautiful" and says for a time they were "inseparable". Irving went on to marry Adam Faith.

In his autobiography, Richard stressed that "sex is not one of the things that drives me", but he also wrote of his seduction by Carol Costa, who at the time was the estranged wife of Jet Harris.

In the 1980s, Richard considered asking Sue Barker, a former French Open tennis champion and Wimbledon semi-finalist, if she would agree to marry him. In 2008, Richard said of his relationship with Barker: "I seriously contemplated asking her to marry me, but in the end I realised that I didn't love her quite enough to commit the rest of my life to her."

Richard first met Barker in 1982, when she was aged 25. Their romance attracted considerable media attention after Richard flew to Denmark to watch her play in a tennis match and they were later photographed cuddling and holding hands at Wimbledon. In an interview in February 1983, Richard spoke of the possibility of marriage with her. He said: "I'm seeing Sue, the only girl I want to see at the moment and if marriage comes on the horizon, I shall relish it." In September 1983, Richard said that he had no immediate plans to marry Barker. He said: "It's not vital to get married and it's not vital to be a father. But I would like to settle down and have a family one day." In July 1984, Barker said of her romance with Richard: "I love him, he's great and I'm sure we love each other."

In 1986, after Richard's romance with Barker had ended and she began dating tennis player Stephen Shaw, Richard said that he was still a friend of Barker. He said: "We have a mutual respect for each other and that means a lot to me."

When later asked why he has never married, Richard said: "I've had a few false alarms. I've been in love, but marriage is a big commitment and being an artist consumes a great deal of time." He said that in the early 1970s he was in love with the singer and actress Olivia Newton-John. Richard said: "At the time when I and many of us were in love with Olivia she was engaged to someone else. I'm afraid I lost the chance."

In 1988, Richard's nephew, Philip Harrison, spent the first four months of his life in a children's hospital suffering from serious breathing problems. Richard later helped to raise money for the hospital in east London and said that his nephew "had a terrible time but the hospital saved his life".

Although he has never married, Richard has rarely lived alone. For many years, he shared his main home with his charity and promotion schedules manager, Bill Latham, and Latham's mother. In 1982, Richard described them as his "second family". Latham's girlfriend, Jill, also lived at the house in Weybridge, Surrey, with them for a time. In 1993, Bill Latham said of Richard's bachelor status: "His freedom has meant that he has been able to do much more than if he had a family. He always goes the extra mile. If he was to have a relationship, he would give it everything. So because his commitments have been his career, his faith, and more latterly, tennis, he has given himself wholeheartedly to those three activities."

Richard often declines discussion about close relationships, and when asked about suggestions that he may be homosexual has stated categorically that he is not. When the suggestions were first put to him in the late 1970s, Richard responded by saying: "It's untrue. People are very unfair with their criticism and their judgements. I've had girlfriends. But people seem to think that if a bloke doesn't sleep around he must be gay. Marriage is a very special thing to me. I'm certainly not going to do it just to make other people feel satisfied."

When asked in 1992 if he had ever considered the possibility that he might be gay, he responded: "No". Richard said: "Even if I got married tomorrow there would be a group of people who would believe what they wanted to believe. All that counts is what your family and friends know and they all trust and respect me. What the people outside think, I have no control over." Later in 1996, Richard said: "I'm aware of the rumours, but I am not gay." In 1997, he said: "People who are single shouldn't have to be second-class citizens—we needn't be embarrassed or feel guilty about it, we all have a role to play."

Richard said that his faith in God was tested in 1999 after the murder of his close friend, the British television presenter Jill Dando. He said: "I was really angry with God. It shook me rigid that someone as beautiful, talented and harmless could have been killed." Richard said that Dando had many likeable qualities and described her as "a very genuine person". He said of Dando's murder: "It is very difficult to understand and I find it all very confusing." He attended her funeral in May 1999 in Weston-super-Mare, Somerset.

Richard has spoken of his friendship with John McElynn, an American former missionary whom he met in 2001 on a visit to New York City. In 2008, Richard said: "John now spends most of his time looking after my properties, which means I don't have to. John and I have over time struck up a close friendship. He has also become a companion, which is great because I don't like living alone, even now."

In an interview with David Frost in 2002, Richard said that his many good friends have prevented him from feeling lonely and he has always has someone he can talk to. Richard has been a family friend of the Northern Irish broadcaster Gloria Hunniford for over 50 years. When Hunniford's daughter Caron Keating was diagnosed with breast cancer and chose to keep her illness private from the public, Richard was among a small close circle of friends who knew of Keating's condition. When Keating died in April 2004, Richard attended her funeral in Kent and performed his song "Miss You Nights" in tribute to her.

In 2006, Richard received a Portuguese order, in which he was appointed Commander of the Order of Prince Henry (ComIH), in recognition of his 40 years of personal and business involvement in the country, which included investments in winemaking and a house in the Algarve where he has spent part of the year throughout the decades. Richard finished No. 56 in the 2002 100 Greatest Britons list, sponsored by the BBC and voted for by the public.

In his 2008 autobiography, Richard wrote that his views on certain issues are less judgemental than when he was younger. He called on the Church of England to affirm people's commitment in same-sex marriage. He wrote: "In the end, I believe, people are going to be judged for what they are. It seems to me that commitment is the issue, and if anyone comes to me and says: 'This is my partner—we are committed to each other,' then I don't care what their sexuality is. I'm not going to judge—I'll leave that to God."

In 2009, the British media reported on a growing friendship between Richard and Cilla Black. The Daily Telegraph said that Richard and Black looked at properties together in Miami and were regularly seen together in Barbados, where they both owned villas. Richard and Black reportedly enjoyed each other's company dining together in Marbella and watching tennis in the Royal Box at Wimbledon. After Black died in August 2015, Richard said: "She was a very special person, and I have lost a very wonderful friend. I will miss her dearly." Richard performed the song "Faithful One" in tribute to Black at her funeral in Liverpool.

In 2010, Richard confirmed that he is no longer a resident of the United Kingdom and had been granted citizenship by Barbados. He said: "I'm officially a non-resident [of the UK], although I will always be British and proud of it." He currently divides his time between living in Barbados and Portugal. When asked in February 2013 if he had regrets about not starting a family, Richard said that if he had been married with children he could not have devoted so much time to his career. He said: "My three sisters have children, and it's been wonderful to watch them grow up, get married and start families of their own. I've made sure I've always played a part in their lives. So while I think I would have been a good father, I've given myself to my family and I wouldn't have it any other way. My 'freedom' allows me to continue my career. Had I been married, with children, I wouldn't be able to do what I do now."

=== Health ===
In December 2025, Richard revealed that he had been treated for prostate cancer during the preceding year, stating that the disease was "gone at the moment" and expressed support for the introduction of a national screening programme for men.

=== Nationwide Festival of Light ===
In 1971, Richard was a leading supporter of the Nationwide Festival of Light, a movement formed by British Christians who were concerned about the development of the permissive society. Richard joined public figures such as Malcolm Muggeridge, Mary Whitehouse and Bishop Trevor Huddleston to demonstrate in London "for love and family life, against pornography and moral pollution". Muggeridge criticised the media as being "largely in the hands of those who for one reason or another favour the present Gadarene slide into decadence and Godlessness".

One of the targets for the Festival of Light's campaign was the growth of sexually explicit films. Richard was one of approximately 30,000 people who gathered at London's Trafalgar Square for a demonstration. One focus of their protest was against the Swedish sex education film Language of Love, which was showing at a nearby cinema.

=== Philanthropy ===
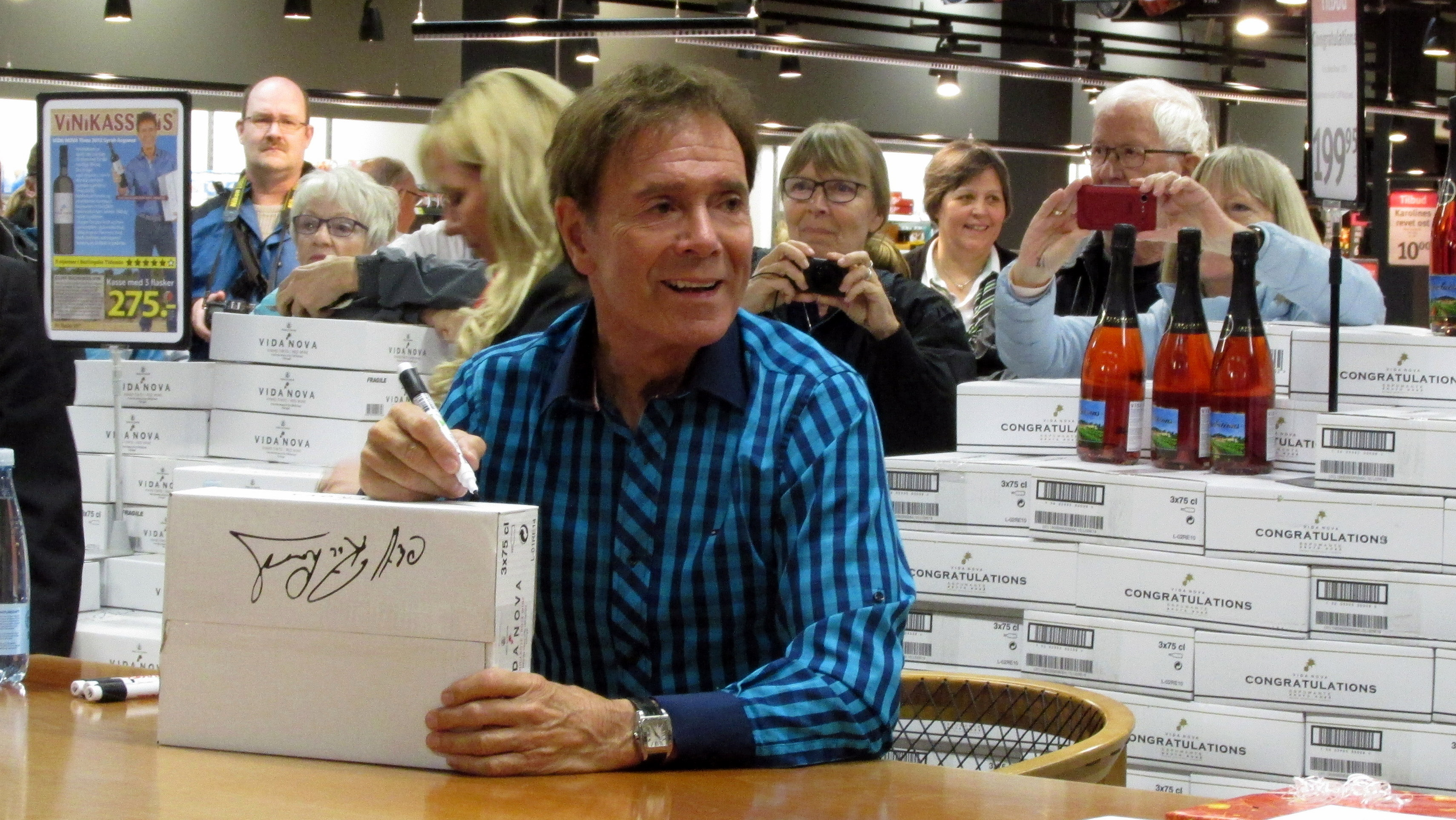
Richard promoting his wine in Denmark, 2015

Since March 1966, Richard has followed the practice of tithing, giving away at least one-tenth of his income to charity. Richard has stated that two biblical principles have guided him in how to use his money. He said: "Firstly, it was the love of money (not money itself) that was the root of all evil. Secondly, to be good and responsible stewards of what was entrusted to us." In 1990, Richard said: "Those of us who have something to offer have to be prepared to give all the time."

For over forty years, Richard has been a supporter of Tearfund, a Christian charity that aims to tackle poverty in many countries across the world. He has made overseas visits to see their work in Uganda, Bangladesh and Brazil. Richard has said: "Playing a part in relieving poverty is, as I see it, the responsibility of us all."

Richard has donated to the dementia research charity, Alzheimer's Research UK. He has helped to raise funds and awareness of the disease by speaking publicly about his mother's condition.

Richard has also supported numerous UK charities over many years through the Cliff Richard Charitable Trust, both through donations and by making personal visits to schools, churches, hospitals and homes for special needs children. Richard's passion for tennis, which was encouraged by his former girlfriend, Sue Barker, also led him in 1991 to establish the Cliff Richard Tennis Foundation. The charity has encouraged thousands of primary schools in the UK to introduce the sport, with over 200,000 children taking part in the tennis sessions which tour the country. The foundation has since become part of the charitable wing of the Lawn Tennis Association.

== Property search, investigation and BBC litigation ==
In August 2014, Richard's apartment in Berkshire was searched after a complaint to the Metropolitan Police's Operation Yewtree, which investigated sexual misconduct allegations in the wake of the Jimmy Savile scandal. Richard was not arrested, and denied the allegations. The BBC was criticised for its coverage of the search. The former Director of Public Prosecutions, Lord Macdonald of River Glaven, QC, criticised the police force for its "completely disreputable conduct" and said its action could make the warrant unlawful. Richard pulled out of a visit to the US Open tennis championships, turned down the freedom of his adopted Portuguese home city of Albufeira, in the Algarve, and cancelled a scheduled appearance at Canterbury Cathedral because he did not want the event to be "overshadowed by the false allegation". He returned to the UK and was interviewed voluntarily by members of South Yorkshire Police. He was never arrested or criminally charged. David Crompton, chief constable of South Yorkshire Police, was criticised for his interactions with the BBC, and publicly apologised to Richard.

In February 2015, South Yorkshire Police announced that the inquiry into the alleged offences had increased and would be continuing. Richard released a statement maintaining that the allegations were "absurd and untrue". The development came a day after an independent report had concluded that South Yorkshire Police had "interfered with the singer's privacy" by telling the BBC about the August 2014 property search. A review by former chief constable Andy Trotter said South Yorkshire Police had breached police guidance on protecting the identity of those under investigation and the handling of the search had dented the force's reputation. The BBC's tip-off regarding the search reportedly came from within Operation Yewtree, although Crompton said he could not be certain that the leak originated from there.

In May 2016, South Yorkshire Police sent a file of evidence to the Crown Prosecution Service. The following month, the CPS announced that after reviewing "evidence relating to claims of non-recent sexual offences dating between 1958 and 1983 made by four men", there was "insufficient evidence" to charge Richard with an offence and that no further action against him would be taken. Richard said he was "obviously thrilled that the vile accusations and the resulting investigation have finally been brought to a close". He said his naming by the media, despite not being charged, meant he had been "hung out like live bait". South Yorkshire Police later "apologised wholeheartedly" to Richard after its investigation into the singer was dropped on 16 June 2016. Richard commented, "My reputation will not be fully vindicated because the CPS's policy is to only say something general about there being 'insufficient' evidence. How can there be evidence for something that never took place?" It was reported that during the 22-month police investigation a man was arrested over a plot to blackmail Richard. The unnamed man in his forties contacted Richard's aides and threatened to spread "false stories" unless he received a sum of money.

On 21 June 2016, the BBC apologised publicly to Richard for causing distress after the controversial broadcast. On 27 September 2016, the Crown Prosecution Service announced that the decision not to prosecute Richard over claims of historical sex offences had been upheld. The CPS reviewed the evidence following applications by two of his accusers and concluded that the decision not to charge Richard was correct. In October 2016, it was reported that Richard was suing the BBC and South Yorkshire Police. Legal papers were filed at the High Court in London on 6 October 2016. South Yorkshire Police later agreed to pay Richard £400,000 after settling a claim he brought against the force.

On 12 April 2018, the case against the BBC opened in the High Court. It was reported that Richard was seeking "very substantial" damages. On 13 April, Richard gave evidence for more than an hour, describing the television coverage as "shocking and upsetting". His written statement was made available online by his lawyers, Simkins LLP. On 18 July 2018, Richard won his High Court case against the BBC and was awarded £210,000 in damages. On 15 August 2018, the BBC stated they would not appeal against the judgement. The BBC repeated an apology for the distress that Richard had been through. The Guardian estimated that the BBC's costs for legal fees and damages had reached £1.9 million after losing the case.

== Cultural significance and impact ==
Cliff Richard's 1958 hit "Move It" is widely regarded as the first authentic British rock and roll record, and "laid the foundations" for the Beatles and Merseybeat music. John Lennon said of Richard that before Cliff and the Shadows, there had been nothing worth listening to in British music.

His successful performing and recording career in the UK has extended over six decades. In 2004, he was named by Channel 4 as the UK's "ultimate pop star", for having sold almost 21 million singles in the nation, which, at that point, was more than any other artist.

== Discography ==
- 1959: Cliff
- 1959: Cliff Sings
- 1960: Me and My Shadows
- 1961: Listen to Cliff!
- 1961: 21 Today
- 1961: The Young Ones
- 1962: 32 Minutes and 17 Seconds with Cliff Richard
- 1963: Summer Holiday
- 1963: When in Spain
- 1964: Wonderful Life
- 1964: Aladdin and His Wonderful Lamp
- 1965: Cliff Richard
- 1965: When in Rome
- 1965: Love is Forever
- 1966: Kinda Latin
- 1966: Finders Keepers
- 1967: Cinderella
- 1967: Don't Stop Me Now!
- 1967: Good News
- 1968: Cliff in Japan
- 1968: Two a Penny
- 1968: Established 1958
- 1969: Sincerely
- 1970: Live at the Talk of the Town
- 1970: About That Man
- 1970: Tracks 'n Grooves
- 1970: His Land
- 1973: Cliff Live in Japan '72
- 1973: Take Me High
- 1974: Help It Along
- 1974: 31 February Street
- 1975: Japan Tour '74
- 1976: I'm Nearly Famous
- 1977: Every Face Tells a Story
- 1978: Small Corners
- 1978: Green Light
- 1979: Thank You Very Much
- 1979: Rock 'n' Roll Juvenile
- 1980: I'm No Hero
- 1981: Wired for Sound
- 1982: Now You See Me, Now You Don't
- 1983: Dressed for the Occasion
- 1983: Silver
- 1983: Rock 'n' Roll Silver
- 1984: The Rock Connection
- 1987: Always Guaranteed
- 1989: Stronger
- 1990: From a Distance: The Event
- 1991: Together with Cliff Richard
- 1993: The Album
- 1995: Songs from Heathcliff
- 1996: Heathcliff Live
- 1997: The Rock 'n' Roll Years 1958–1963 (box set)
- 1998: Real as I Wanna Be
- 2001: Wanted
- 2002: Live at the ABC Kingston 1962
- 2002: The Singles Collection (box set)
- 2003: Cliff at Christmas
- 2004: The World Tour
- 2004: Something's Goin' On
- 2005: From a Distance: The Event (reconfigured version)
- 2006: Two's Company
- 2007: Love... The Album
- 2008: And They Said It Wouldn't Last: My 50 Years in Music (box set)
- 2009: Reunited – Cliff Richard and The Shadows
- 2010: Bold as Brass
- 2011: Soulicious
- 2012: Let Me Tell You Baby...It's Called Rock 'n' Roll!
- 2013: The Fabulous Rock 'n' Roll Songbook
- 2016: Just... Fabulous Rock 'n' Roll
- 2018: Rise Up
- 2020: Music... The Air That I Breathe
- 2022: Christmas with Cliff
- 2023: Cliff with Strings – My Kinda Life
- 2024: Cliff Richard and The Shadows – The Final Reunion
- 2026: Only Number Ones

== Filmography ==
=== Film ===
- 1959: Serious Charge
- 1960: Charlie Drake Stirs it Up - (British Pathé i.d.1698.22)
- 1960: Expresso Bongo
- 1961: The Young Ones (aka It's Wonderful to be Young)
- 1963: Summer Holiday
- 1964: Wonderful Life (aka Swingers' Paradise)
- 1966: Finders Keepers
- 1966: Thunderbirds Are Go (voice as a singing marionette)
- 1968: Two a Penny
- 1970: His Land
- 1972: The Case (features Olivia Newton-John)
- 1973: Take Me High
- 2012: Run for Your Wife (cameo role as a busker)

=== Television series ===
- 1960–63: The Cliff Richard Show (ATV Television)
- 1964–67: Cliff (ATV Television)
- 1965: Cliff and the Shadows (ATV Television)
- 1970–74: It's Cliff Richard featuring Hank Marvin, Una Stubbs and Olivia Newton-John (BBC Television)
- 1975–76: It's Cliff and Friends (BBC Television)

=== Selected television specials ===
| Year | Title | Total viewers | Channel |
|---|---|---|---|
| 1971 | Getaway with Cliff | 5.2 million | BBC |
| 1972 | The Case | 5 million | BBC |
| 1987 | The Grand Knockout Tournament | | BBC1 |
| 1999 | An Audience with Cliff Richard | 11 million | ITV |
| 2001 | The Hits I Missed | 6.5 million | ITV |
| 2008 | When Piers Met Sir Cliff | 5.5 million | ITV |
| 2022 | Cliff at Christmas | | BBC2 |

== Publications ==
- 2020: The Dreamer: An Autobiography
- 2023: A Head Full Of Music (scheduled release October 2023)

== Theatre work ==
- Aladdin and His Wonderful Lamp: music by the Shadows and Norrie Paramor
- Cinderella: music by the Shadows and Norrie Paramor
- Five Finger Exercise by Peter Shaffer
- The Potting Shed by Graham Greene
- Time: music by Dave Clark
- Heathcliff: music by John Farrar and lyrics by Sir Tim Rice
- Snow White and the Seven Dwarfs (pre-recorded) guest appearance as the Magic Mirror

== Awards ==
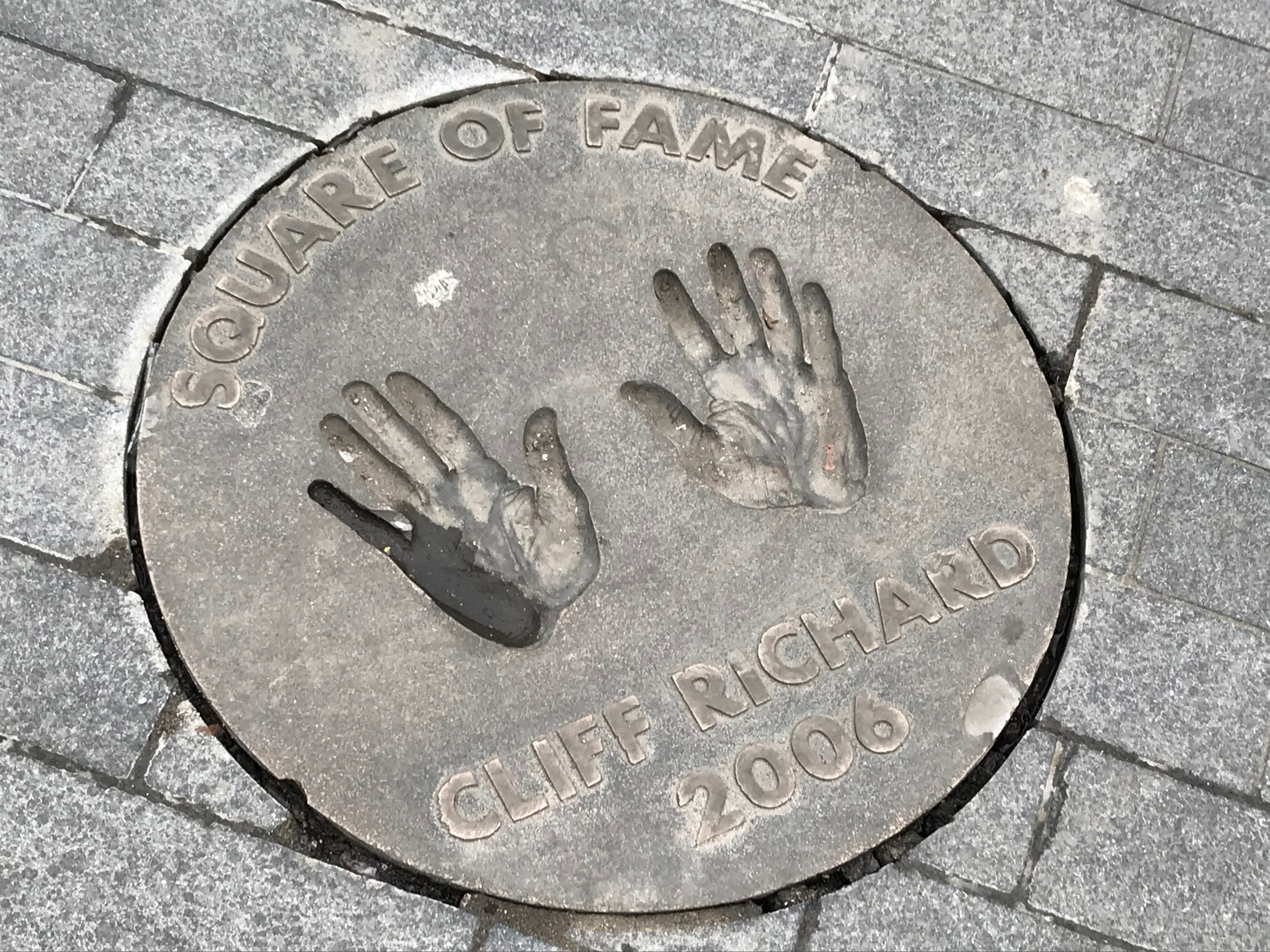
Richard's handprints at the Wembley Square of Fame in London

Brit Awards

- 1977: Best British male solo artist
- 1982: Best British male solo artist
- 1989: Lifetime achievement: Outstanding contribution to music (excluded the Shadows)

TV Times

- 1980: Most Exciting Male Singer on TV
- 1987: Best Male Singer
- 1989: Favourite Singer

The Sun Reader Polls

- 1970: Male Pop Personality
- 1971: Top Male Pop Personality
- 1972: Top Male Pop Personality

NME Reader Polls

- 1958: Best New Disc or TV Singer
- 1959: UK Male Singer
- 1959: Best Single: "Living Doll"
- 1960: Best UK Single: "Living Doll"
- 1961: UK Male Singer
- 1962: UK Male Singer
- 1963: UK Male Singer
- 1963: Best World Male Singer
- 1964: UK Male Singer
- 1964: UK Vocal Personality
- 1965: UK Male Singer
- 1966: UK Male Singer
- 1966: UK Vocal Personality
- 1967: UK Vocal Personality
- 1968: UK Vocal Personality
- 1969: British Vocal Personality
- 1970: UK Male Singer
- 1970: UK Vocal Personality
- 1970: World's Best Recording Artist of the '60s
- 1971: UK Male Singer
- 1971: British Vocal Personality
- 1972: UK Male Singer
- 1972: British Vocal Personality

Ivor Novello

- 1968: Most Performed Work: "Congratulations" by Bill Martin and Phil Coulter
- 1970: Outstanding Services to Music

Melody Maker

- 1959: Best Male Singer
- 1960: Top British Male Singer
- 1962: The Emen Award: Top male singer
- 1962: Top British Male Singer
- 1962: Top single of the year: "The Young Ones"
- 1963: Best Male Singer
- 1964: Best Male Singer
- 1965: Best UK Male Singer
- 1967: Top Male Singer

Disc & Music Echo

- 1967: Best-Dressed Male
- 1968: Best-Dressed Male
- 1969: Best-Dressed Male
- 1970: Top British Male Singer
- 1970: Best-Dressed Male
- 1970: Mr. Valentine
- 1971: Mr. Valentine

Bravo Magazine (West Germany)

- 1964: Best Male Singer: Gold
- 1964: Year End Singles Charts: 1. "Sag 'no' Zu Ihm" ("Don't talk to him")
- 1965: Best Male Singer: Gold
- 1980: Top International Male Singer

Record Mirror

- 1961: Record Mirror Survey: Most successful chart records 1958–1961: No. 1: Cliff Richard, "Living Doll" (Richard had three of the top five records and a further two in the Top 50)
- 1964: Record Mirror Poll: Best-Dressed Singer in the World

1960s

- 1961: Royal Variety Club: Show Business Personality
- 1961: Weekend Magazine: Star of Stars
- 1962: Motion Picture Herald Box-Office Survey of 1962: Most Popular Male Film Actor
- 1963: Motion Picture Herald Box-Office Survey of 1963: Most Popular Male Film Actor
- 1963: 16 (US magazine): Most Promising Singer
- 1964: Billboard (US magazine): Best Recording Artist UK
- 1969: Valentine Magazine: Mr Valentine

1970s

- 1970: National Viewers' and Listeners' Association: Outstanding Contribution to Religious Broadcasting and Light Entertainment
- 1971: Record Mirror: UK Male Singer
- 1974: Nordoff Robbins Music Therapy Committee: Silver Clef: Outstanding Services to the Music Industry
- 1977: The Songwriters' Guild of Great Britain: Golden Badge Award
- 1979: Music Week: Special Award for 21 years as successful recording artistes: Cliff Richard and the Shadows
- 1979: EMI Records: Gold Clock and Gold Key award: EMI celebrates 21-year partnership with Richard

1980s

- 1980: Richard receives O.B.E. from the Queen
- 1980: BBC TV Multi-Coloured Swap Shop: Best UK Male Vocalist
- 1980: National Pop And Rock Awards: Best Family Entertainer
- 1980: Nationwide, in conjunction with Radio 1 and the Daily Mirror: Best Family Entertainer
- 1981: Sunday Telegraph Readers Poll: Top Pop Star
- 1981: Daily Mirror Readers Award: Outstanding Music Personality of the Year
- 1989: The Lifetime Achievement Diamond Award (Antwerp)

1990s

- 1995: American Society of Composers, Authors and Publishers: Pied Piper Award (Richard became the first British recipient of Ascap's coveted Pied Piper Award, which recognises outstanding contributions to the songwriter and music community)
- 1995: The formal investiture of Richard as Knight Bachelor took place at 10:30 a.m. in Buckingham Palace on Wednesday 25 October
- 1998: Dutch Edison: Lifetime Achievement Award

2000s

- 2000: South Bank Awards: Outstanding Achievement Award
- 2003: British Academy of Songwriters, Composers and Authors: Gold Badge of Merit
- 2003: Lawn Tennis Association: 20 Years of Service to Tennis Award
- 2004: Induction into UK Music Hall of Fame (representing the 1950s: Cliff and the Shadows)
- 2004: Ultimate Pop Star (No. 1 singles recording artist in UK)
- 2005: Avenue of Stars (star on the pavement, London)
- 2005: Rose D'or Music Festival (Paris): Golden Rose
- 2006: Commander of the Portuguese Order of Prince Henry (awarded for services to Portugal)

2010s

- 2011: The National German Sustainability Award

== See also ==
- List of best-selling music artists
- List of celebrities who own wineries and vineyards
- Cliff – The Musical

== Bibliography ==
- Tremlett, George (12 September 1975). The Cliff Richard Story. London, England: Futura Publications Limited. ISBN 978-0-86007-232-4.
- Lewry, Peter; Goodall, Nigel (12 September 1991). Cliff Richard: The Complete Recording Sessions, 1958–90. London: Blandford Press. ISBN 978-0-7137-2242-0.
- Richard, Cliff (4 October 1990). Which One's Cliff?. London: Hodder & Stoughton. ISBN 978-0-340-27159-9.
- Richard, Cliff; Latham, Bill (1 September 1983). You, Me and Jesus. London: Hodder & Stoughton. ISBN 978-0340346280.
- Turner, Steve (1 January 2008). Cliff Richard: The Biography. Oxford, England, UK: Lion Books. ISBN 978-0-7459-5279-6.
- Turner, Steve (3 August 2009). Cliff Richard: The Bachelor Boy. London: Carlton Books Ltd. ISBN 978-1-84442-037-7.
- Read, Mike (8 September 1983). The Story of the Shadows. London: Elm Tree books. ISBN 978-0-241-10861-1.
- Frame, Pete (1 December 1993). The Complete Rock Family Rock Trees. London: Omnibus. ISBN 978-0-7119-6879-0.
- Roberts, David (17 June 2006). Guinness World Records: British Hit Singles and Albums (19th ed.). London: Guinness World Records Limited. ISBN 978-1-904994-10-7.
- Warwick, Neil; Kutner, Jon; Brown, Tony (10 April 2004). The Complete Book of the British Charts (3rd ed.). London: Music Sales Ltd. ISBN 978-1-84449-058-5.
- Nicolson, Dave (30 April 2011). Jet Harris: In Spite of Everything. York, UK: Music Mentor Books. ISBN 978-0-9562679-0-0.

| Preceded by Sandie Shaw with "Puppet on a String" | UK in the Eurovision Song Contest; 1968 | Succeeded by Lulu with "Boom Bang-a-Bang" |
| Preceded by The New Seekers with "Beg, Steal or Borrow" | UK in the Eurovision Song Contest; 1973 | Succeeded by Olivia Newton-John with "Long Live Love" |
