= Wired for Sound (song) =

1981 single by Cliff Richard

Single by Cliff Richard

from the album Wired for Sound
- B-side: "Hold On"
- Released: 17 August 1981
- Recorded: May–July 1981
- Genre: Pop rock
- Length: 3:37
- Label: EMI
- Songwriters: Alan Tarney, B.A. Robertson
- Producer: Alan Tarney

Cliff Richard singles chronology
"A Little in Love" (1981)	"Wired for Sound" (1981)	"Daddy's Home" (1981)

Music video
- "Wired for Sound" on YouTube

"Wired for Sound" is a song recorded by English singer Cliff Richard, released in 1981 as the lead single for his album of the same name. The song reached number 4 in the UK Singles Chart and was certified silver by the BPI for sales over 250,000. The song reached number 2 in Australia and South Africa, and was a hit in a number of European countries. The song was written by Alan Tarney and B.A. Robertson.

A live version of the song was released in 1990 as an extra track on Richard's CD and 12" single of "From a Distance".

The music video was filmed at Milton Keynes Shopping Centre.

== Chart performance and certifications ==
=== Weekly charts ===
Chart (1981–82)	Peak position
Australia (Kent Music Report)	2
Austria (Ö3 Austria Top 40)	11
Belgium (Ultratop 50 Flanders)	8
Germany (GfK)	13
Ireland (IRMA)	6
Israel (Reshet Gimmel / IBA)	10
Netherlands (Dutch Top 40)	31
Netherlands (Single Top 100)	34
New Zealand (Recorded Music NZ)	10
South Africa (Springbok Radio)	2
UK Singles (OCC)	4
US Billboard Hot 100	71
US Cash Box Top 100	70

=== Year-end charts ===
Chart (1981)	Position
Australia (Kent Music Report)	52
Belgium (Ultratop Flanders)	93
UK Singles (OCC)	64

Chart (1982)	Position
Australia (Kent Music Report)	29

=== Certifications ===
Certifications for Wired for Sound
Region	Certification	Certified units/sales
United Kingdom (BPI)	Silver	250,000^{^}
^{^} Shipments figures based on certification alone.

== Covers ==
In May 2000, Australian duo B(if)tek featuring Julee Cruise released an electronic music cover version as a single from their album 2020. It reached number 82 in the Australian charts.

English alternative rock band Shed Seven recorded a cover for an unreleased Cliff Richard tribute album. Their version was later released on the limited edition bonus CD of their greatest hits compilation Going For Gold, released in 1999.
