= RG Jones Sound Engineering =

Production support company

RG Jones
- Type: Private
- Industry: Entertainment, Professional Audio
- Founded: 1926 in London, England
- Founder: Reginald Geoffrey Jones
- Headquarters: London, England
- Area served: Worldwide
- Divisions: Rental; Integration; Sales
- Website: rgjones.co.uk

RG Jones Sound Engineering, or simply RG Jones, is a professional audiovisual, sound reinforcement and live touring production support company. Founded in 1926, RG Jones is the oldest British sound reinforcement company still in operation and one of the oldest in the world.

== History ==
Ronald GodfreyJones (1912–1987) worked as a salesman for Milton Products in busy street markets where he could not be heard above the crowd. To solve the problem he built a public address system which he mounted on top the panel van he conducted business out of. The public address system consisted of a microphone connected to an amplifier which fed two large wooden horn loudspeakers he had constructed. Four 12V batteries were used to power a rotary 48V to 23V converter to provide portable electricity for the system. The Milton Products Company asked Jones to build 8 more of these systems, leading to his founding the Magnet Publicity Broadcasting Company, which was later re-named RG Jones.

In 1942 Jones moved his company to Morden in southwest London and began installing sound reinforcement systems in numerous London theatres. Jones also designed the Theatre Panatrope--a system that facilitated precise cueing of a sound effects or music record for theatre productions.

To further expand his business, Jones built a recording studio based in two downstair rooms of his house. Originally recordings were cut straight to acetate disc.

During World War II, RG Jones Recording Studios produced recorded plays used for the American Overseas armed forces radio programs. The company's mobile PA vans and sound equipment were used by The Home Guard and the Red Cross. RG Jones provided PA systems for VE Day celebrations and VJ Day around London.

In 1952, RG Jones opened a second studio at Morden, and became one of the first four track recording studios in the uk.

In 1964, the Rolling Stones first recorded at RG Jones Studios. The studio also recorded many artists who later became mega stars including David Bowie, The Yardbirds, The Springfields, Tom Jones, The Bee Gees and Lulu.

In 1969, RG Jones opened a new studio in Wimbledon, London SW19 and closed the Morden studio which was demolished to make way for Merton College. Notable artists who recorded at the studio before its eventual closure in 2001 included the Moody Blues, The Who, David Bowie, Love Affair, Sonny Boy Williamson, the Rolling Stones, Elton John, the Bee Gees, Leo Sayer, The Police, a-ha, Cliff Richard, and Mark Morrison.

In 1971 company founder Ronald passed the company on to his son, Robin, and retired. Ronald died 16 years later in 1987 at the age of 75.

RG Jones business maintained separate divisions for equipment rental, sales, installation projects, and the recording studio.

In the 1980s, the rental division gained prominence through such high-profile events as Royal Fireworks for the Wedding of Prince Charles and Lady Diana Spencer in 1981, the 1982 visit by Pope John Paul II to the United Kingdom, and the opening of the Thames Barrier the same year. The company also supporting classical open-air concerts at Kenwood House, Marble Hill House, and Crystal Palace Bowl. In 1997, the company provided sound reinforcement at the Funeral of Diana, Princess of Wales. The rental division also experienced an increase in jobs supporting outdoor broadcast events for the BBC, Thames TV, and London Weekend Television. Outdoor festivals, including the Henley Festival, Glastonbury Festival, and Radio 1's Big Weekend became clients for RJ Jones as well. In 2014, the company provided sound reinforcement at the Outlook festival in Croatia.

The RG Jones installation division completed projects for such high-profile entities and buildings as the Lloyd's building, the Royal Academy of Arts, the BBC, Buckingham Palace, St Paul's Cathedral, Westminster Cathedral, Lord's Cricket Ground, Wimbledon Lawn Tennis Club, and City of London Corporation. In 2012, the company completed work at the Baitul Futuh Mosque. The company has been installing, maintaining, and operating AV systems for the Royal Household for more than 30 years, and is the first English sound company to be able to display a Royal warrant.

In 1998, with Robin approaching retirement, management buyout (MBO) talks began, with the MBO completed on 7 July 2004. RG Jones continues to provide sound systems for festivals, concerts, sporting and special events, and also has a large installed sound business providing service to churches, businesses and schools.
