= Cliff Richard singles discography =

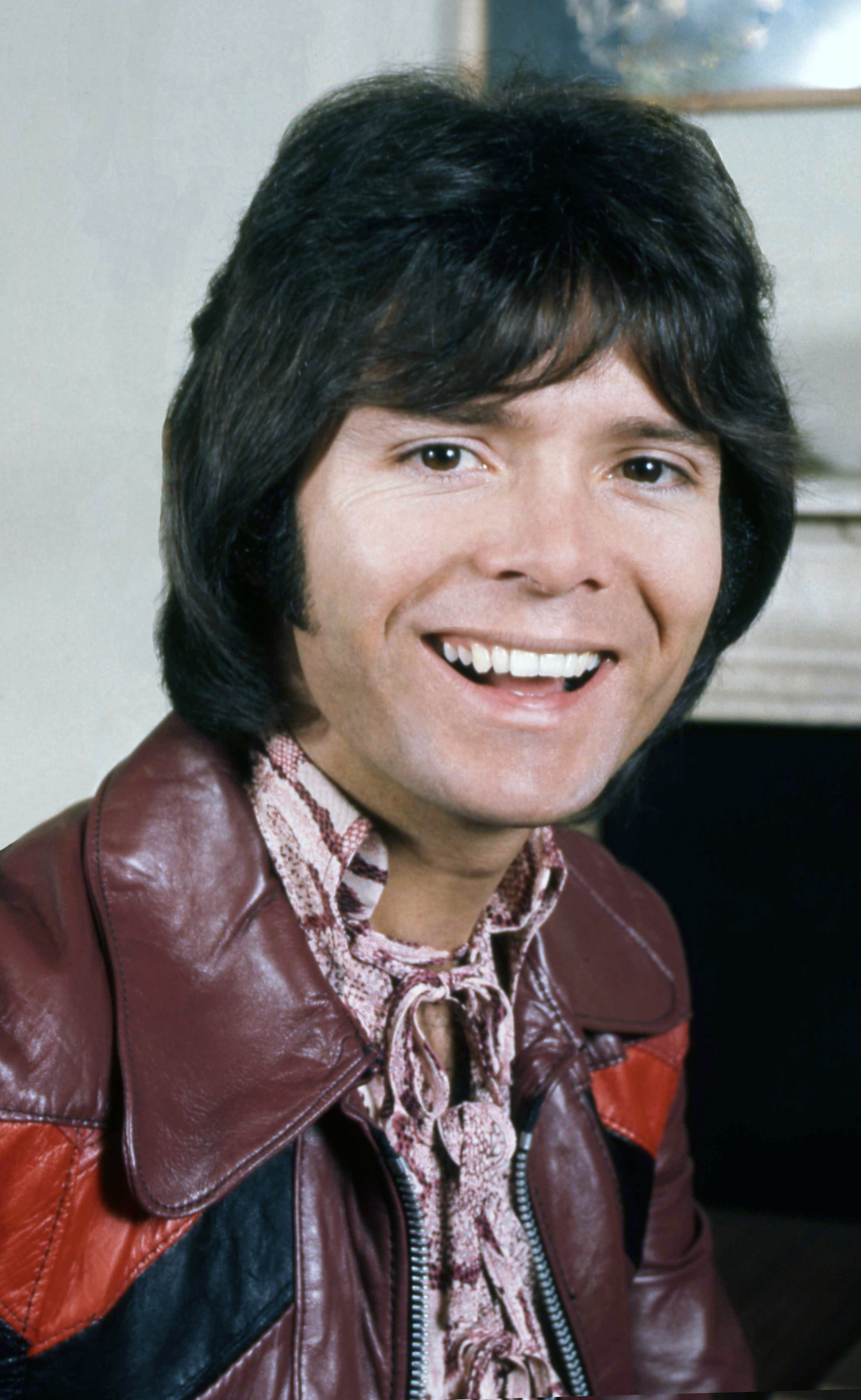
- Richard in 1973
- UK singles: 161
- German-language singles: 22
- Italian-language singles: 5
- Other singles: 25

The singles discography of the British singer Cliff Richard consists in excess of 200 singles, of which 159 singles have been released in the UK in varying vinyl, CD, cassette and digital formats. Listed alongside the UK singles in the discography below are a further 20 singles which were released in other territories, as well as 22 singles which were sung in German and only released in German-speaking countries.

Richard's debut single "Move It", recorded with his equally successful backing band the Drifters (later renamed the Shadows) was written by original guitarist Ian Samwell. It was released in August 1958, and was the first British rock and roll hit to make the UK singles chart top ten, reaching number two and spending 17 weeks on the chart. He achieved his first number one in August 1959 with his fifth single, "Living Doll", which spent six weeks at the summit while becoming the UK's highest-selling single of 1959. From then, through to December 1963, Richard achieved 19 consecutive top-four singles, including seven number ones and a further six peaking at number two. Richard accumulated a total of 28 weeks at number one on the UK singles chart in this period. His biggest hit of this period, "The Young Ones", lifted from the film of the same name, debuted at number one on the charts, spent a total of six weeks at number one and went on to achieve the rare feat in the UK alone, of sales of over a million – it was only the sixth million-seller in the UK and remains his highest-selling single in the UK.

From 1964, despite the emerging dominance of the Beatles and beat music, Richard continued achieving top 10 hits throughout the 1960s, although the frequency of top-five hits dropped off. In 1968, the track "Congratulations" was chosen to be his first Eurovision Song Contest entry, and although it came second in the contest, it became his biggest hit of the last half of the sixties, reaching number one in the UK and a number of European countries.

In the 1950s and 1960s, singles were the dominant sales medium, generally far ahead of album sales. Towards the end of the 1960s and into the 1970s, this shifted, with albums becoming dominant. For the first half of the 1970s, Richard struggled to achieve big hits, apart from his 1973 Eurovision Song Contest entry "Power to All Our Friends". It was not until 1975 that Richard changed the focus of his recording career from singles to albums, beginning with the recording of the I'm Nearly Famous album. It produced the lead single "Miss You Nights", released in late 1975, and "Devil Woman", which became his first US top-ten hit and biggest hit there. From this time, the singles were generally lifted from the albums, although not exclusively. In 1979, Richard's single "We Don't Talk Anymore" became the highest selling record of his career achieving worldwide sales over four million.

From the late 1970s through the 1980s and into the 1990s Richard continued to have many top 10 hit singles, including the seasonal number ones "Mistletoe and Wine" in 1988 and "Saviour's Day" in 1990. Although from the mid-1990s Richard has suffered a lack of radio airplay, he has continued to have success, rounding out the 1990s with the number one "The Millennium Prayer", Throughout the 2000s, he had top-five singles throughout the first decade, up until song downloads began to be included in the UK singles chart.

Richard has achieved 14 number one singles on the UK singles chart, including having the unique distinction of having two versions of the same song hitting number-one on the singles chart. "Living Doll" first topped the charts in 1959, then again 26 years later in a re-recording for the Comic Relief charity with the cast of British TV series The Young Ones. Richard also has the distinction of being the only artist to have achieved UK number-one singles in five consecutive decades, 1950s, 1960s, 1970s, 1980s and 1990s. Richard's sales of singles within the UK itself make him the highest-selling British male solo artist of singles of all time.

== Singles ==
=== 1950s ===
Title	Year	Peak chart positions										Certifications (Note: The British Disc music paper awarded silver discs (for UK sales of 250,000) from 1959 until 1973. Awards were based on professionally audited sales figures submitted by record companies. In 1973, it was superseded by the British Phonographic Industry (BPI) setting up an 'official' certification award system.)	Album
Title	Year	UK	AUS	BEL (FLA)	CAN	GER	IRE	NL	NOR	SWE	US	Certifications	Album
"Move It" / "Schoolboy Crush" (Note: "Schoolboy Crush" was the original A-side and "Move It" the original B-side.) with the Drifters	1958	2 —	100 —	— —	— —	— —	— —	— —	5 —	— —	— —		Non-album singles
"High Class Baby" with the Drifters	1958	7	—	—	—	—	—	—	3	—	—		Non-album singles
"Livin' Lovin' Doll" with the Drifters	1959	20	—	—	—	—	—	—	—	—	—		Non-album singles
"Mean Streak" / "Never Mind" with the Drifters	1959	10; 21	— —	— —	— —	— —	— —	— —	— 5	— —	— —		Non-album singles
"Living Doll" with the Drifters	1959	1	9	16	37	19	1	3	1	1	30	UK: Gold	Non-album singles
"Travellin' Light" / "Dynamite" with the Shadows	1959	1; 16	57 —	— (Note: "Travellin' Light" did not enter the Flanders chart, but did peak at number 38 on the Wallonia chart.) —	— —	— —	1 —	15 —	1 —	4 —	— (Note: "Travellin' Light" did not enter the Billboard Hot 100, but did peak at number 7 on the Music Vendor Beat of the Week Heading for the Top 100 chart.) — (Note: "Dynamite" did not enter the Billboard Hot 100, but did peak at number 15 on the Cash Box Looking Ahead chart.)	UK: Silver	Non-album singles
Cliff Richard: The 1950s		UK	AUS	BEL	CAN	GER	IRE	NL	NOR	SWE	US		
Number 1 hits		2	0	0	0	0	2	0	2	1	0		
Top 10 hits		5	1	0	0	0	2	1	5	2	0		

=== 1960s ===
Title	Year	Peak chart positions											Certifications	Album
Title	Year	UK	AUS	BEL (FLA)	CAN	GER	IRE	NL	NOR	NZ	SWE	US	Certifications	Album
"A Voice in the Wilderness" with the Shadows	1960	2	95	—	—	—	1	14	8	—	8	—	UK: Silver	Non-album singles
"Fall in Love with You" with the Shadows	1960	2	—	—	—	—	2	12	6	—	14	—	UK: Silver	Non-album singles
"Please Don't Tease" with the Shadows	1960	1	2	—	—	—	1	8	1	1	6	—	UK: Silver	Non-album singles
"Nine Times Out of Ten" with the Shadows	1960	3	29	13	—	—	3	—	7	4	—	—	UK: Silver	Non-album singles
"I Love You" with the Shadows	1960	1	78	14	—	34	4	6	5	1	20	—	UK: Silver	Non-album singles
"Catch Me" (Note: "Catch Me" was first released as a single in the US and Canada as "Catch Me, I'm Falling" in early 1961. It was later released in Australia in 1962 as "Catch Me".) with the Shadows	1961	—	22	—	—	—	—	—	—	—	—	—		21 Today
"Theme for a Dream" with the Shadows	1961	3	22	16	—	—	4	12	—	3	—	— (Note: "Theme for a Dream" did not enter the Billboard Hot 100, but did peak at number 12 on the Cash Box Looking Ahead chart.)	UK: Silver	Non-album single
"Gee Whizz It's You" (Note: "Gee Whizz It's You" was not initially officially released in the UK (produced as an export release), but charted due to import sales.) with the Shadows	1961	4	62	20	—	—	3	—	—	—	—	—		My and My Shadows
"A Girl Like You" with the Shadows	1961	3	22	15	—	—	4	7	2	3	4	—	UK: Silver	Non-album single
"What'd I Say" (Note: Similar to "Gee Whizz It's You", "What'd I Say" was only produced as an export release.) with the Shadows	1961	—	—	—	—	—	—	—	—	—	—	—		Listen to Cliff!
"When the Girl in Your Arms Is the Girl in Your Heart"	1961	3	2	4	—	—	2	—	1	5	18	—	UK: Silver	The Young Ones
"Forty Days" (Note: "Forty Days" was only released as a single in Continental Europe and Southern Africa.) with the Shadows	1961	—	—	—	—	—	—	8	—	—	—	—		21 Today
"Outsider" (Note: "Outsider" was only released as a single in Australia, India and Southern Africa.)	1962	—	22	—	—	—	—	—	—	—	—	—		21 Today
"The Young Ones" with the Shadows	1962	1	6	4	5	16	1	1	2	1	4	—	UK: Gold	The Young Ones
"How Wonderful to Know" (Note: "How Wonderful to Know" was only released as a single in Italy and Belgium.)	1962	—	—	—	—	—	—	—	—	—	—	—		21 Today
"I'm Lookin' out the Window" / "Do You Want to Dance" with the Shadows	1962	2	3	— 4	— —	— —	2	— 1	2	2	3	— —	UK: Silver	Non-album single
"Lessons in Love" (Note: "Lessons in Love" was only released as a single in Europe and Southern Africa.) with the Shadows	1962	—	—	—	—	—	—	7	—	—	—	—		The Young Ones
"It'll Be Me" with the Shadows	1962	2	6	8	14	—	2 (Note: The official Irish charts listed "It'll Be Me" for one week only, at number 10, in its inaugural publication, 10 October 1962. Because this is after it had peaked in the existing charts, the chart peak at number 2 in the Evening Herald (1 week, 21 September) and Billboard (2 weeks), has been used instead. Note, the Billboard publication lags 3 or 4 weeks behind the Irish official chart. Billboard. Nielsen Business Media, Inc. (sourced from Teenager Express, Dublin). 20 October 1962. p. 14. ISSN 0006-2510.)	2	2	3	5	—	UK: Silver	32 Minutes and 17 Seconds with Cliff Richard
"Wonderful to Be Young" (Note: "Wonderful to Be Young" was only released as a single in the US and Canada.) with the Shadows	1962	—	—	—	16	—	—	—	—	—	—	— (Note: "Wonderful to Be Young" did not enter the Billboard Hot 100, but did peak at number 35 on the Music Vendor Heading for the Top 100 chart.)		Wonderful to Be Young
"Y'Arriva" (Note: "Y'Arriva" was only released as a single in Scandinavia.) with the Shadows	1962	—	—	—	—	—	—	—	—	—	17	—		21 Today
"The Next Time" / "Bachelor Boy" with the Shadows	1962	1	9	3	— 2	—	1	1	2; 8	4; 2	2	— 99	UK: Gold	Summer Holiday
"Summer Holiday" / "Dancing Shoes" with the Shadows	1963	1	3	5	1	—	2	2	1	1	6; 9	—	UK: Silver	Summer Holiday
"Lucky Lips" with the Shadows	1963	4	4	1	8	1	1	1	1	—	1	62	UK: Silver; World: Gold	Non-album singles
"It's All in the Game"	1963	2	7	6	1	—	2	4	2	3	10	25	UK: Silver	Non-album singles
"Don't Talk to Him" with the Shadows	1963	2	3	7	14	2	1	5	1	5	9	—	UK: Silver	Non-album singles
"Maria No Mas" (Note: "Maria No Mas" was only released as a single in Continental Europe and South America.) with the Shadows	1963	—	—	4	—	—	—	2	—	—	—	—		When in Spain
"I'm the Lonely One" with the Shadows	1964	8	16	—	18	2	9	3	4	—	13	92		Non-album single
"I Only Have Eyes for You" (Note: "I Only Have Eyes for You" was only released as a single in Australia and the US.)	1964	—	31	—	—	—	—	—	—	—	—	— (Note: "I Only Have Eyes for You" did not enter the Billboard Hot 100, but peaked at number 9 on the Bubbling Under Hot 100 Singles chart, which acts as an extension to the Hot 100.)		It's All in the Game
"Constantly (L'Edera)"	1964	4	6	9	—	—	8	3	4	6	10	—	UK: Silver	Non-album single
"On the Beach" with the Shadows	1964	7	4	10	— (Note: In Canada, after the RPM charts became the default national Canadian music chart mid-1964, two of Richard's singles were more successful on the CHUM Chart: "On the Beach" reached number 12 and "I Could Easily Fall (in Love with You)" reached number 21.)	—	6	3	4	—	12	—	UK: Silver	Wonderful Life
"The Twelfth of Never"	1964	8	6	—	14	—	—	13	9	7	—	— (Note: "The Twelfth of Never" did not enter the Billboard Hot 100, but did peak at number 29 on the Cash Box Looking Ahead chart.)		Non-album single
"I Don't Wanna Love You" (Note: "I Don't Wanna Love You" was only released as a single in the US and Canada.)	1964	—	—	—	—	—	—	—	—	—	—	— (Note: "I Don't Wanna Love You" did not enter the Billboard Hot 100, but did peak at number 20 on the Cash Box Looking Ahead chart.)		Cliff Richard
"I Could Easily Fall (in Love with You)" with the Shadows	1964	6	9	17	40	—	8	3	3	—	6	—	UK: Silver	Aladdin and His Wonderful Lamp
"The Minute You're Gone" / "Just Another Guy"	1965	1 —	6	— 24 (Note: In Belgium, "Just Another Guy" charted in 1980 when re-released with "The Minute You're Gone" as the B-side.)	— —	— —	2 —	— (Note: "The Minute You're Gone" did not enter the Dutch Single Top 20, but did peak at number 21 on the Dutch Top 40.) —	6 —	— —	19 —	— (Note: "The Minute You're Gone" did not enter the Billboard Hot 100, but did peak at number 12 on the Record World Singles Coming Up chart.) —	UK: Silver	Non-album single
"Angel" (Note: "Angel" was produced as an export release. It was only released as a single in Europe, Australia and Japan.)	1965	—	6	14	—	—	—	— (Note: "Angel" did not enter the Dutch Single Top 20, but did peak at number 40 on the Dutch Top 40.)	—	—	—	—		Cliff Richard
"On My Word"	1965	12	31	—	—	—	—	— (Note: "On My Word" did not enter the Dutch Single Top 20, but did peak at number 20 on the Dutch Top 40.)	—	—	—	—		Non-album singles
"The Time in Between" with the Shadows	1965	22	83	—	—	—	—	—	—	—	—	—		Non-album singles
"Wind Me Up (Let Me Go)"	1965	2	40	—	23	—	5	15	—	6	18	—	UK: Silver	Non-album singles
"Blue Turns to Grey" with the Shadows	1966	15	20	—	—	—	—	18	—	11	—	—		Non-album singles
"Visions"	1966	7	81	—	—	40	9	— (Note: "Visions" did not enter the Dutch Single Top 20, but did peak at number 21 on the Dutch Top 40.)	—	4	—	—		Non-album singles
"Time Drags By" with the Shadows	1966	10	98	—	—	—	—	— (Note: "Time Drags By" did not enter the Dutch Single Top 20, but did peak at number 37 on the Dutch Top 40.)	—	13	—	—		Finders Keepers
"In the Country" with the Shadows	1966	6	10	—	—	35	10	14	7	3	12	—		Cinderella
"It's All Over"	1967	9	65	—	—	—	11	— (Note: "It's All Over" did not enter the Dutch Single Top 20, but did peak at number 24 on the Dutch Top 40.)	—	15	—	—		Non-album singles
"I'll Come Runnin'"	1967	26	69	—	—	—	—	— (Note: "I'll Come Runnin'" did not enter the Dutch Single Top 20, but did peak at number 31 on the Dutch Top 40.)	—	10	—	—		Non-album singles
"The Day I Met Marie"	1967	10	5	—	—	—	10	7	—	4	—	—		Non-album singles
"All My Love (Solo Tu)"	1967	6	9	3	—	—	8	12	—	5	—	—		Non-album singles
"Congratulations"	1968	1	5	1	32	3	1	1	1	2	1	99	UK: Gold	Non-album singles
"I'll Love You Forever Today"	1968	27	67	—	—	—	—	—	—	—	—	—		Two a Penny
"Wonderful World" (Note: "Wonderful World" was only released as a single in Belgium and Japan.)	1968	—	—	20	—	—	—	—	—	—	—	—		Non-album singles
"Marianne"	1968	22	56	18	—	—	15	— (Note: "Marianne" did not enter the Dutch Single Top 20, but did peak at number 37 on the Dutch Top 40.)	—	—	—	—		Non-album singles
"Don't Forget to Catch Me" with the Shadows	1968	21	47	—	—	—	—	—	—	—	—	—		Established 1958
"Good Times (Better Times)"	1969	12	46	8	—	37	9	12	—	20	17	—		Non-album singles
"Big Ship"	1969	8	38	13	—	—	8	—	—	—	—	—		Non-album singles
"Early in the Morning" (Note: "Early in the Morning" was only released as a single in Continental Europe, Australasia, Japan and Southern Africa.)	1969	—	55	—	—	—	—	—	—	—	—	—		Tracks 'n Grooves
"Throw Down a Line" with Hank Marvin	1969	7	58	12	—	—	8	—	—	15	—	—		Non-album singles
"With the Eyes of a Child"	1969	20	74	—	—	—	16	—	—	—	—	—		Non-album singles
Cliff Richard: The 1960s		UK	AUS	BEL	CAN	GER	IRE	NL	NOR	NZ	SWE	US		
Number 1 hits		7	0	2	2	1	7	5	6	4	2	0		
Top 10 hits		33	20	15	5	4	31	20	24	23	15	0		

=== 1970s ===
Title	Year	Peak chart positions											Certifications	Album
Title	Year	UK	AUS	BEL (FLA)	CAN	GER	IRE	NL	NOR	NZ	SWE	US	Certifications	Album
"The Joy of Living" with Hank Marvin	1970	25	71	—	—	—	—	—	—	—	—	—		Non-album singles
"Goodbye Sam, Hello Samantha"	1970	6	29	4	—	11	1	20	—	10	—	—		Non-album singles
"I Ain't Got Time Anymore"	1970	21	—	—	—	—	14	—	—	—	—	—		Non-album singles
"Sunny Honey Girl"	1971	19	—	30	—	—	—	—	—	20	—	—		Non-album singles
"Silvery Rain"	1971	27	—	—	—	—	—	—	—	—	—	—		Non-album singles
"Flying Machine"	1971	37	—	—	—	35	—	—	—	—	—	—		Non-album singles
"La Ballade de Baltimore" (Note: "La Ballade de Baltimore" was only released as a single in France and Belgium.)	1971	—	—	— (Note: "La Ballade de Baltimore" did not enter the Flanders chart, but did peak at number 31 on the Wallonia chart.)	—	—	—	—	—	—	—	—		Non-album singles
"Sing a Song of Freedom"	1971	13	—	—	—	42	—	—	—	—	14	—		Non-album singles
"Jesus"	1972	35	—	—	58	—	—	—	—	—	—	—		Non-album singles
"Living in Harmony"	1972	12	—	—	—	—	10	—	—	—	—	—		Non-album singles
"A Brand New Song"	1972	51 (Note: "A Brand New Song" was Richard's first UK single not to enter the UK top 50, breaking a run of 57 consecutive chart hits over a period of 16 years. However, it did reach number one on the "Breakers List", which was an officially published BRMB list of the most popular records in the UK outside of the top 50.)	—	—	—	—	—	—	—	—	—	—		Non-album singles
"Power to All Our Friends"	1973	4	31	2	—	4	2	1	1	11	1	— (Note: "Power to All Our Friends" did not enter the Billboard Hot 100, but peaked at number 9 on the Bubbling Under Hot 100 Singles chart, which acts as an extension to the Hot 100.)	UK: Silver	Non-album singles
"Help It Along" / "Tomorrow Rising"	1973	29	—	—	—	—	—	—	—	—	—	—		Non-album singles
"Take Me High"	1973	27	88	—	—	29	—	27	—	6	—	—		Take Me High
"(You Keep Me) Hangin' On"	1974	13	—	—	—	—	15	—	—	13	—	—		Non-album single
"Nothing to Remind Me" (Note: "Nothing to Remind Me" was only released as a promotional single in the UK. However, it was given a commercial release in Belgium.)	1974	—	—	—	—	—	—	—	—	—	—	—		The 31st of February Street
"It's Only Me You Left Behind"	1975	60 (Note: "It's Only Me You've Left Behind" peaked at number ten on the official BRMB "Breakers List".)	—	—	—	—	—	—	—	—	—	—		Non-album singles
"Honky Tonk Angel"	1975	55 (Note: "Honky Tonk Angel" peaked at number five on the official BRMB "Breakers List".)	—	—	—	—	—	—	—	—	—	—		Non-album singles
"Miss You Nights"	1975	15	100	17	—	—	—	10	—	—	—	—		I'm Nearly Famous
"Devil Woman"	1976	9	3	— (Note: "Devil Woman" did not enter the Flanders chart, but did peak at number 32 on the Wallonia chart.)	4	—	6	—	7	5	—	6	CAN: Gold; US: Gold	I'm Nearly Famous
"I Can't Ask for Anymore Than You"	1976	17	—	23	—	—	2	—	—	38	—	80		I'm Nearly Famous
"Hey Mr. Dream Maker"	1976	31	82	—	—	—	—	21	—	34	—	—		Every Face Tells a Story
"My Kinda Life"	1977	15	61	19	—	38	—	18	—	—	—	—		Every Face Tells a Story
"Don't Turn the Light Out" (Note: "Don't Turn the Light Out" was only released as a single in the US and Canada.)	1977	—	—	—	83	—	—	—	—	—	—	57		Every Face Tells a Story
"When Two Worlds Drift Apart"	1977	46	—	—	—	—	—	—	—	—	—	—		Every Face Tells a Story
"Try a Smile" (Note: "Try a Smile" was only released as a single in the US and Canada.)	1977	—	—	—	—	—	—	—	—	—	—	— (Note: "Try a Smile" did not enter the Billboard Hot 100, but did peak at number 48 on the Adult Contemporary chart.)		Every Face Tells a Story
"Every Face Tells a Story (It Never Tells a Lie)" (Note: "Every Face Tells a Story (It Never Tells a Lie)" was only released as a single in Australia.)	1977	—	—	—	—	—	—	—	—	—	—	—		Every Face Tells a Story
"Yes He Lives"	1978	—	—	—	—	—	—	—	—	—	—	—		Small Corners
"Why Should the Devil Have All the Good Music" (Note: "Why Should the Devil Have All the Good Music" was only released as a single in Continental Europe.)	1978	—	—	—	—	—	—	—	—	—	—	—		Small Corners
"Please Remember Me"	1978	—	—	—	—	—	—	—	—	—	—	—		Green Light
"Can't Take the Hurt Anymore"	1978	—	—	—	—	—	—	—	—	—	—	—		Green Light
"Green Light"	1979	57	—	—	—	—	—	—	—	—	—	—		Green Light
"We Don't Talk Anymore"	1979	1	3	1	4	1	1	4	1	5	4	7	UK: Gold; GER: Gold; NL: Gold	Rock 'n' Roll Juvenile
"Hot Shot"	1979	46	—	—	—	—	27	—	—	—	—	—		Rock 'n' Roll Juvenile
"Carrie"	1979	4	18	26	89	26	4	29	—	8	—	34	UK: Silver	Rock 'n' Roll Juvenile
Cliff Richard: The 1970s		UK	AUS	BEL	CAN	GER	IRE	NL	NOR	NZ	SWE	US		
Number 1 hits		1	0	1	0	1	2	1	2	0	1	0		
Top 10 hits		5	2	3	2	2	7	3	3	5	2	2		

=== 1980s ===
Title	Year	Peak chart positions											Certifications	Album
Title	Year	UK	AUS	BEL (FLA)	CAN	GER	IRE	NL	NOR	NZ	SWE	US	Certifications	Album
"Dreamin'"	1980	8	4	2	9	6	9	15	—	12	14	10	UK: Silver	I'm No Hero
"Suddenly" with Olivia Newton-John	1980	15	37	—	60	—	6	—	—	30	—	20		Xanadu (soundtrack)
"A Little in Love"	1980	15	66	25	4	—	16	38	—	29	—	17		I'm No Hero
"In the Night" (Note: "In the Night" was only released as a single in Germany.)	1980	—	—	—	—	52	—	—	—	—	—	—		I'm No Hero
"Give a Little Bit More" (Note: "Give a Little Bit More" was only released as a single in the US, Canada and New Zealand.)	1981	—	—	—	30	—	—	—	—	—	—	41		I'm No Hero
"Wired for Sound"	1981	4	2	8	— (Note: "Wired for Sound" did not enter the RPM 50 Singles, but did peak at number 26 on the Contemporary Adult chart.)	13	6	34	—	10	—	71	UK: Silver	Wired for Sound
"Daddy's Home" (live)	1981	2	8	8	41	73	3	14	—	4	—	23	UK: Gold	Wired for Sound
"The Only Way Out"	1982	10	14	6	— (Note: "The Only Way Out" did not enter the RPM 50 Singles, but did peak at number 3 on the Contemporary Adult chart.)	59	10	20	—	21	—	64		Now You See Me, Now You Don't
"Where Do We Go from Here"	1982	60	—	27	—	—	22	—	—	—	—	—		Now You See Me, Now You Don't
"It Has to Be You, It Has to Be Me" (Note: "It Has to Be You, It Has to Be Me" was only released as a single in Continental Europe.)	1982	—	—	—	—	36	—	—	—	—	—	—		Now You See Me, Now You Don't
"Little Town"	1982	11	—	40	—	—	11	—	—	—	—	—		Now You See Me, Now You Don't
"She Means Nothing to Me" with Phil Everly	1983	9	39	—	—	—	7	—	—	—	—	—		Phil Everly (Phil Everly self-titled album)
"True Love Ways" (live) with the London Philharmonic Orchestra	1983	8	35	24	—	—	4	41	—	45	—	—		Dressed for the Occasion
"Drifting" with Sheila Walsh	1983	64	—	28	—	—	—	—	—	—	—	—		Drifting (Sheila Walsh album)
"Never Say Die (Give a Little Bit More)"	1983	15	81	21	—	63	19	—	9	35	13	73		Silver
"Please Don't Fall in Love"	1983	7	95	—	—	—	5	—	—	—	—	—	UK: Silver	Silver
"Baby You're Dynamite" / "Ocean Deep"	1984	27; 72 (Note: After the UK release of "Baby You're Dynamite" / "Ocean Deep" finished its initial chart run (finishing on 5 May 1984), it was given a new picture cover with "Ocean Deep" as the A-side. It then re-entered the Top 75 chart at 72 for one week (on 15 May 1984).)	46 —	35 —	— —	— —	16 —	— —	— —	— —	— —	— —		Silver
"Donna" (Note: "Donna" was only released as a single in the US and Canada.)	1984	—	—	—	— (Note: "Donna" did not enter the RPM 50 Singles, but did peak at number 7 on the Contemporary Adult chart.)	—	—	—	—	—	—	— (Note: "Donna" did not enter the Billboard Hot 100, but did peak at number 17 on the Adult Contemporary chart.)		Rock 'n' Roll Silver (UK) Give a Little Bit More (US) (Note: The Rock 'n' Roll Silver album was only released as a part of the Silver album's box-set edition in 1983. All its tracks have been re-released as part of the remastered release of the album The Rock Connection (the original release included half of the Rock 'n' Roll Silver tracks; the remastered release also included the remainder as bonus tracks).)
"Two to the Power of Love" with Janet Jackson	1984	83	—	—	—	—	—	—	—	—	—	—		Dream Street (Janet Jackson album)
"Shooting from the Heart"	1984	51	47	—	—	—	—	—	—	—	—	—		The Rock Connection
"Heart User"	1985	46	—	—	—	—	—	—	—	—	—	—		The Rock Connection
"She's So Beautiful"	1985	17	78	15	—	61	13	—	—	40	—	—		Time: The Album (soundtrack)
"It's in Every One of Us"	1985	45	—	—	—	—	—	—	—	—	—	—		Time: The Album (soundtrack)
"Living Doll" with the Young Ones and Hank Marvin	1986	1	1	1	—	24	1	1	9	1	8	—	UK: Gold; NL: Gold; NZ: Gold	Non-album single
"Born to Rock 'n' Roll"	1986	78	88	—	—	—	28	—	—	—	—	—		Time: The Album (soundtrack)
"All I Ask of You" with Sarah Brightman	1986	3	24	—	—	—	1	—	—	—	—	—	UK: Silver	Non-album single (Note: The first Cliff Richard album to include the "All I Ask of You" single with Sarah Brightman was Private Collection: 1979–1988.); For cast version: Phantom of the Opera
"Slow Rivers" with Elton John	1986	44	82	24	—	—	25	—	—	42	—	—		Leather Jackets (Elton John album)
"My Pretty One"	1987	6	56	36	—	31	4	92	—	—	—	—		Always Guaranteed
"Some People"	1987	3	7	2	—	6	5	5	—	—	20	—	UK: Silver	Always Guaranteed
"Remember Me"	1987	35	—	22	—	20	14	—	—	—	—	—		Always Guaranteed
"Two Hearts"	1988	34	—	—	—	—	21	—	—	—	—	—		Always Guaranteed
"Mistletoe and Wine"	1988	1	30	22	—	70	1	71	7	—	—	—	UK: Platinum	Private Collection: 1979–1988
"The Best of Me"	1989	2	59	32	—	61	2	55	—	25	—	—	UK: Silver	Stronger
"I Just Don't Have the Heart"	1989	3	100	25	—	41	7	67	—	—	—	—	UK: Silver	Stronger
"Lean on You"	1989	17	107	—	—	60	10	66	—	—	—	—		Stronger
"Whenever God Shines His Light" with Van Morrison	1989	20	—	—	—	—	3	—	—	—	—	—		Avalon Sunset (Van Morrison album)
Cliff Richard: The 1980s		UK	AUS	BEL	CAN	GER	IRE	NL	NOR	NZ	SWE	US		
Number 1 hits		2	1	1	0	0	3	1	0	1	0	0		
Top 10 hits		14	5	6	2	2	17	2	3	3	1	1		

=== 1990s ===
Title	Year	Peak chart positions							Certifications	Album
Title	Year	UK	AUS	BEL (FLA)	GER	IRE	NL	NZ	Certifications	Album
"Stronger Than That"	1990	14	140	36	—	8	—	—		Stronger
"Silhouettes" (live)	1990	10	—	—	51	13	—	—		From a Distance: The Event
"From a Distance" (live)	1990	11	101	—	—	16	—	—		From a Distance: The Event
"Saviour's Day"	1990	1	97	36	—	5	—	—	UK: Silver	From a Distance: The Event
"We Don't Talk Anymore" (remix) (Note: "We Don't Talk Anymore" was remixed by PWL using the live recording from From a Distance: The Event. It was only released as a single in Continental Europe and Australia.)	1990	—	111	—	—	—	—	—		From a Distance: The Event
"More to Life"	1991	23	—	—	—	17	—	—		Trainer (TV series soundtrack)
"Scarlet Ribbons" (Note: "Scarlet Ribbons" was only released as a single in Continental Europe and New Zealand. It was later released in the UK as the B-side to "This New Year".)	1991	—	—	—	51	—	—	19		Together with Cliff Richard
"We Should Be Together"	1991	10	—	—	—	9	—	—		Together with Cliff Richard
"This New Year"	1991	30	—	—	—	—	—	—		Together with Cliff Richard
"I Still Believe in You"	1992	7	176	—	—	18	—	—		The Album
"Peace in Our Time"	1993	8	—	—	59	26	—	—		The Album
"Human Work of Art"	1993	24	—	—	—	—	—	—		The Album
"Never Let Go"	1993	32	—	—	—	—	—	—		The Album
"Healing Love"	1993	19	—	—	—	—	—	—		The Album
"All I Have to Do Is Dream" (live) with Phil Everly / "Miss You Nights" (remix)	1994	14	93	—	—	—	—	22		Non-album single The Hit List (Note: "Miss You Nights" was a remix of the original lead single from the 1976 studio album I'm Nearly Famous. It was included on the 1994 compilation album The Hit List and used to promote the album on the CD sleeve of the double A-side single "All I Have to Do Is Dream" / "Miss You Nights", which noted it as taken from the album.)
"Misunderstood Man"	1995	19	—	—	—	—	—	—		Songs from Heathcliff
"Had to Be" with Olivia Newton-John	1995	22	—	—	—	—	—	—		Songs from Heathcliff
"The Wedding" with Helen Hobson	1996	40	—	—	—	—	—	—		Songs from Heathcliff
"Be with Me Always"	1997	52	—	—	—	—	—	—		Songs from Heathcliff
"Can't Keep this Feeling In"	1998	10	—	—	—	—	83	—		Real as I Wanna Be
"The Miracle"	1999	23	—	—	—	—	—	—		Real as I Wanna Be
"The Millennium Prayer"	1999	1	2	18	23	3	12	2	UK: Platinum; AUS: 2× Platinum; NZ: 2× Platinum	Non-album single
Cliff Richard: The 1990s		UK	AUS	BEL	GER	IRE	NL	NZ		
Number 1 hits		2	0	0	0	0	0	0		
Top 10 hits		7	1	0	0	4	0	1		

=== 2000s ===
Title	Year	Peak chart positions				Album
Title	Year	UK	UK Physical	DEN	IRE	Album
"Somewhere Over the Rainbow"/"What a Wonderful World" (medley)	2001	11	—	—	—	Wanted
"Let Me Be the One"	2002	29	—	—	—	Wanted
"Santa's List"	2003	5	—	—	19	Cliff at Christmas
"Somethin' Is Goin' On"	2004	9	—	—	—	Something's Goin' On
"I Cannot Give You My Love"	2004	13	—	—	—	Something's Goin' On
"What Car"	2005	12	—	—	—	Something's Goin' On
"Yesterday Once More" with Daniel O'Donnell	2006	—	—	—	—	Two's Company: The Duets
"21st Century Christmas" / "Move It" only latter with Brian May and Brian Bennett	2006	2	1	18	—	Non-album single Two's Company: The Duets
"When I Need You"	2007	38	13	—	—	Love... The Album
"Thank You for a Lifetime"	2008	3	1	—	—	The 50th Anniversary Album
"Singing the Blues" with the Shadows	2009	40	2	—	—	Reunited – Cliff Richard and the Shadows
Cliff Richard: The 2000s		UK	UK Physical	DEN	IRE	
Number 1 hits		0	2	0	0	
Top 10 hits		4	3	0	0	

=== 2010s ===
Title	Year	Peak chart positions	Album
Title	Year	UK Vinyl	Album
"Rip It Up"	2013	—	The Fabulous Rock 'n' Roll Songbook
"Since I Lost My Baby" with Engelbert Humperdinck	2014	—	Engelbert Calling (Engelbert Humperdinck album)
"Golden"	2015	—	75 at 75
"Roll Over Beethoven"	2016	—	Just... Fabulous Rock 'n' Roll
"It's Better to Dream" (Christmas mix)	2016	—	Just... Fabulous Rock 'n' Roll
"Blue Suede Shoes" with Elvis Presley	2017	—	Just... Fabulous Rock 'n' Roll
"(It's Gonna Be) Okay" with the Piano Guys	2017	—	So Far, So Good (The Piano Guys album)
"Rise Up"	2018	1	Rise Up
"Reborn"	2018	—	Rise Up
"Everything That I Am" / "The Miracle of Love"	2018	—	Rise Up
Cliff Richard: The 2010s		UK Vinyl	
Number 1 hits		1	
Top 10 hits		1	

=== 2020s ===
Title	Year	Album
"Falling for You"	2020	Music... The Air That I Breathe
"Older"	2020	Music... The Air That I Breathe
"PS Please"	2020	Music... The Air That I Breathe
"Mistletoe & Wine" with Collabro	2021	Non-album single
"Hurting Each Other" with Carla Williams	2022	A Tribute to the Carpenters (Carla Williams album)
"Sleigh Ride"	2022	Christmas with Cliff
"Rockin' Around the Christmas Tree"	2022	Christmas with Cliff
"It's the Most Wonderful Time of the Year"	2022	Christmas with Cliff
"Heart of Christmas"	2022	Christmas with Cliff
"The Young Ones" (orchestral version)	2023	Cliff with Strings – My Kinda Life
"The Best of Me" (orchestral version)	2023	Cliff with Strings – My Kinda Life

=== German language ===
Title	Year	Peak chart positions			Album
Title	Year	GER	AUT	SWI	Album
"Bin verliebt" ("Fall in Love with You")	1961	40	—	—	Non-album singles
"Schön wie ein Traum" ("Theme for a Dream") / "Vreneli"	1961	33; 50	— —	— —	Non-album singles
"Rote Lippen soll man küssen" ("Lucky Lips")	1963	1	1	1	Non-album singles
"Zuviel allein" ("I'm the Lonely One") / "Sag' "no" zu ihm" ("Don't Talk to Him")	1964	2	—	— 2	Non-album singles
"Das ist die Frage aller Fragen" ("Spanish Harlem")	1964	1	1	1	Non-album singles
"Es war keine so wunderbar wie du" ("I Could Easily Fall (in Love with You)")	1965	5	—	8	Non-album singles
"Nur bei dir bin ich zu Haus" ("Wind Me Up (Let Me Go)")	1965	21	—	—	Non-album singles
"Du bist mein erster Gedanke" ("Quiéreme mucho")	1966	15	9	—	Non-album singles
"Das Glück ist rosarot"	1966	35	—	—	Non-album singles
"Ein Girl wie Du" ("A Girl Like You")	1967	23	—	—	Non-album singles
"Es ist nicht gut, allein zu sein" / "Ein Sonntag mit Marie" ("The Day I Met Marie")	1967	18; 12	— —	— —	Non-album singles
"Man gratuliert mir" ("Congratulations")	1968	—	—	—	Non-album singles
"London ist nicht weit" ("London's Not Too Far") / "Mrs. Emily Jones"	1968	— 34	— —	— —	Non-album singles
"Zärtliche Sekunden" ("Don't Forget to Catch Me")	1969	—	—	—	Hier ist Cliff
"Du, du gefällst mir so" ("Green, Green")	1970	—	—	—	Non-album single
"Goodbye Sam (Das ist die Liebe)" ("Goodbye Sam, Hello Samantha")	1970	11	—	—	Ich träume deine Träume
"Ich träume deine Träume"	1971	—	—	—	Ich träume deine Träume
"Wenn du lachst, lacht das Glück" ("Sally Sunshine")	1971	39	—	—	Ich träume deine Träume
"Gut, dass es Freunde gibt" ("Power to All Our Friends")	1973	—	—	—	Non-album singles
"Es gehören zwei zum Glücklichsein" ("(You Keep Me) Hangin' On")	1974	—	—	—	Non-album singles
"Weihnachtszeit – Mistletoe & Wine" ("Mistletoe and Wine") with Claudia Jung	1996	—	—	—	Winterträume (Claudia Jung album)
"Schmetterlings-Küsse" ("Butterfly Kisses")	2014	—	—	—	Non-album single
Cliff Richard: German language		GER	AUT	SWI	
Number 1 hits		2	2	2	
Top 10 hits		4	3	4	

=== Italian language ===
Title	Year	Album
"Non l'ascoltare" ("Don't Talk to Him")	1965	When in Rome
"Dicitencello vuje" ("Just Say I Love Her")	1965	When in Rome
"Immagina un giorno" ("The Day I Met Marie")	1967	Non-album singles
"Congratulations"	1968	Non-album singles
"Non dimenticare chi ti ama" ("Don't Forget to Catch Me")	1969	Non-album singles

=== Other appearances (singles) ===
Title	Year	Peak chart positions								
Title	Year	UK	AUS	BEL (FLA)	GER	IRE	NL	NZ	SWE	SWI
"Live-In World" The Anti-Heroin Project	1986	142	—	—	—	—	—	—	—	—
"Do They Know It's Christmas?" Band Aid II	1989	1	30	17	74	1	20	8	15	24
"Everybody's Got a Crisis in Their Life" Simon Cummings and various others	1990	—	—	—	—	—	—	—	—	—
"To a Friend" Alexander Mezek	1991	—	—	—	—	—	—	—	—	—
"Grief Never Grows Old" One World Project	2005	4	—	—	—	21	—	—	—	—

== Duets ==
Cliff Richard has duetted on singles and albums with many singers during his career:

Year	Song	Collaborator(s)	Album
1968	"Passing Strangers"	Cilla Black	Completely Cilla: 1963-1973
1969	"The Look of Love/Walk On By"	Cilla Black	The Definitive Collection
1969	"Throw Down a Line"	Hank Marvin	Non-album single
1970	"The Joy of Living"	Hank Marvin	Non-album single
1971	"Don't Move Away"	Olivia Newton-John	Non-album track (B-side of "Sunny Honey Girl")
1980	"Suddenly"	Olivia Newton-John	Xanadu (film soundtrack)
1983	"Drifting"	Sheila Walsh	War of Love (titled Drifting in the UK)
1983	"She Means Nothing to Me" "I'll Mend Your Broken Heart"	Phil Everly	Phil Everly (self-titled album)
1984	"Two to the Power of Love"	Janet Jackson	Dream Street
1986	"All I Ask of You"	Sarah Brightman	Non-album single For cast version: Phantom of the Opera (1986 original London cast soundtrack)
1986	"Only You"	Sarah Brightman	Non-album single (B-side of "All I Ask of You", 12-inch edition only); Love Changes Everything, 2005
1986	"Slow Rivers"	Elton John	Leather Jackets
1989	"Share a Dream"	Aswad	Stronger
1989	"Whenever God Shines His Light"	Van Morrison	Avalon Sunset
1990	"To A Friend"	Alexander Mežek	Presented to the Heart (Alexander Mežek album)
1993	"That's What Friends Are For"	Cilla Black	Through the Years
1994	"This Love"	Tammy Wynette	Without Walls
1995	"We Being Many"	Helen Shapiro	Nothing But the Best
1995	"Move It"	Hank Marvin	Hank Plays Cliff
1995	"Had to Be" "Dream Tomorrow" "I Do Not Love You Isabella" * "Choosing when it's too Late" "Marked with Death"	Olivia Newton-John * and Kristina Nichols	Songs from Heathcliff
1996	"If Ever I Would Leave You"	Helen Hobson	Hobson's Choice
1997	"Move It" (live)	Hank Marvin	Hank Plays Live
1998	"Vita Mia"	Vincenzo La Scola	Real as I Wanna Be, Vita Mia
1999	"My Love" "If it Were Up to Me"	Vincenzo La Scola	Vita Mia
1999	"The Twelfth of Never"	Michelle Wolf	Non-album single (B-side of "The Miracle", CD 1 of 2)
1999	"If it Were Up to Me" "Different is Beautiful"	Vincenzo La Scola; Coolio, Jennifer Paige, Michelle Wolf, Steve Lukather, Vincenzo La Scola	Progression (Peter Wolf album)
2002	"Reunited"	Lulu	Together
2002	"Let It Be Me"	Olivia Newton-John	2 (Japanese release only)
2003	"Imagine"	Cilla Black	Beginnings
2003	"Danny Boy"	Helmut Lotti	Pop Classics In Symphony
2003	"Mary's Boy Child"	Helmut Lotti	Cliff at Christmas
2004	"Miss You Nights" "Let It Be Me"	Elaine Paige	Centre Stage: The Very Best of Elaine Paige
2006	"Anyone Who Had a Heart"	Dionne Warwick	Two's Company The Duets
2006	"Fields of Gold"	Barry Gibb	Two's Company The Duets
2006	"Let There Be Love"	Matt Monro	Two's Company The Duets
2006	"Miss You Nights"	G4	Two's Company The Duets
2006	"Move It"	Brian May and Brian Bennett	Two's Company The Duets
2006	"Yesterday Once More"	Daniel O'Donnell	Two's Company The Duets
2008	"Find a Little Faith"	Olivia Newton-John	A Celebration in Song
2008	"Look Up Look Down"	Olsen Brothers	Respect (Olsen Brothers album)
2009	"I Could Be Persuaded"	The Bellamy Brothers	The Anthology, Vol. 1
2010	"He Knows, She Knows"	Majella O'Donnell	By Request
2010	"The Air That I Breathe"	Albert Hammond	Legend
2011	"Saving a Life"	Freda Payne	Soulicious
2011	"Go On and Tell Him" "She Looked Good" *	Dennis Edwards & The Temptations Review * and Lamont Dozier	Soulicious
2011	"Do You Ever"	Brenda Holloway	Soulicious
2011	"Teardrops" "This Time with You"	Candi Staton	Soulicious
2011	"When I was Your Baby"	Roberta Flack	Soulicious
2011	"Are You Feeling Me"	Deniece Williams	Soulicious
2011	"Oh How Happy"	Marilyn McCoo and Billy Davis Jr.	Soulicious
2011	"Every Piece of My Broken Heart"	Valerie Simpson	Soulicious
2011	"How We Get Down"	Russell Thompkins Jr. & The New Stylistics	Soulicious
2011	"I'm Your Puppet"	Percy Sledge	Soulicious
2011	"Always and Forever"	Billy Paul	Soulicious
2011	"Birds of a Feather"	Peabo Bryson	Soulicious
2012	"Have Yourself a Merry Little Christmas"	Olivia Newton-John, John Travolta	This Christmas
2014	"Since I Lost My Baby"	Engelbert Humperdinck	Engelbert Calling
2016	"Blue Suede Shoes"	Elvis Presley	Just... Fabulous Rock 'n' Roll
2017	"(It's Gonna Be) Okay"	The Piano Guys	So Far So Good
2018	"This Old Heart of Mine" (Dozier & Richard) / "My World Is Empty Without You" (Dozier only)	Lamont Dozier	Reimagination
2018	"You're My World"	Cilla Black	Cilla (with the Royal Philharmonic Orchestra)
2019	"Taking Control"	Bonnie Tyler	Between The Earth and The Stars
2019	"Samstag Nacht" ("Saturday Night")	Howard Carpendale (with the Royal Philharmonic Orchestra)	Symphonie Meines Lebens (Symphony of My Life)
2020	"It is Well"	Sheila Walsh	Braveheart Worship
2020	"Silent Night"	Lisa Troyer	Non-album single

== See also ==
- Cliff Richard albums discography
- Cliff Richard videography
- List of million-selling singles in the United Kingdom
