= Cliff Richard albums discography =

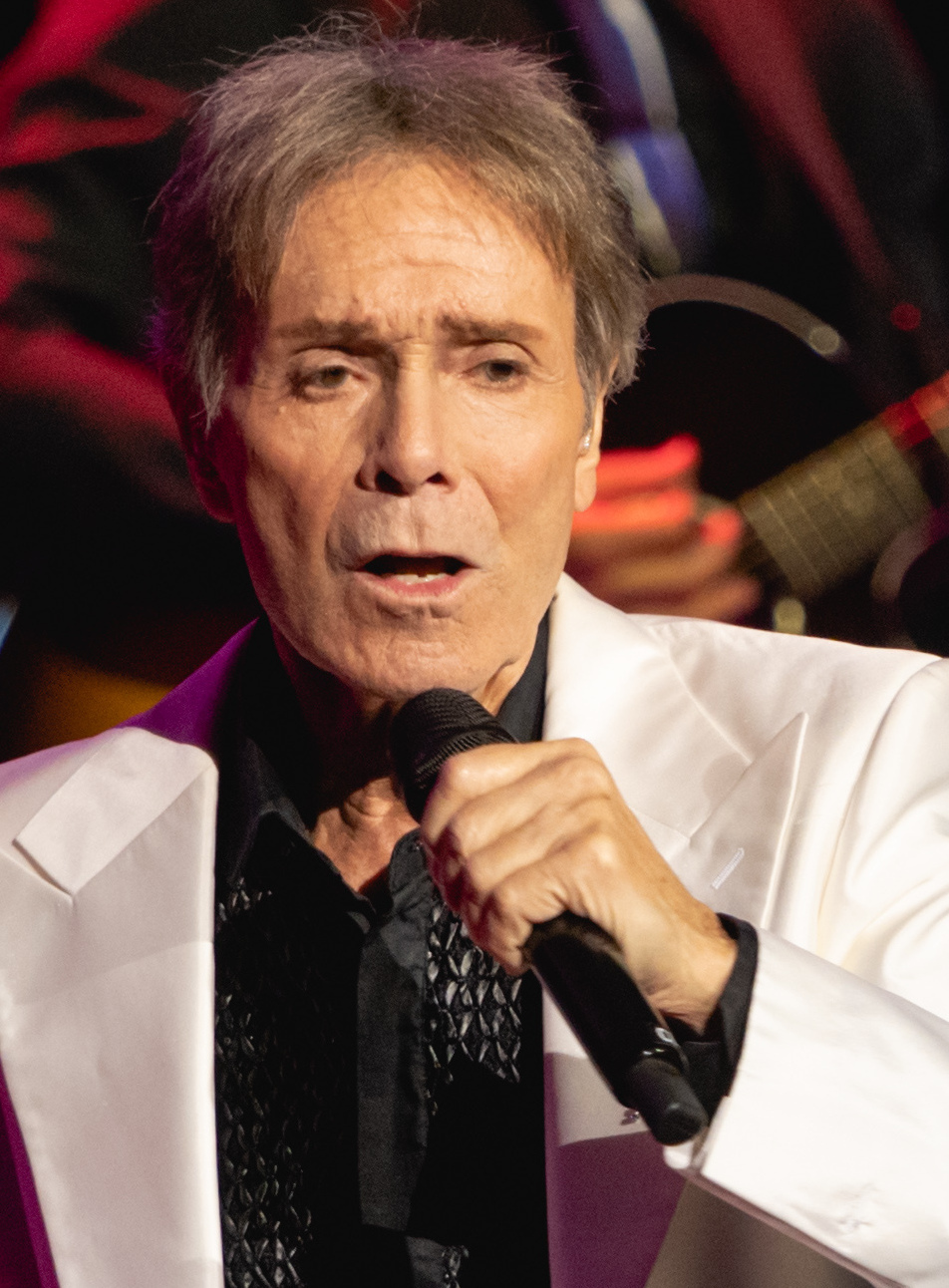
- Richard performing at the Royal Albert Hall in 2021
- Studio albums: 49 (47 UK + 2 Germany)
- EPs: 47 (UK)
- Soundtrack albums: 7
- Live albums: 16 (14 UK + 2 Japan)
- Compilation albums: 17 (UK)
- Cast recording albums: 3 (UK)
- Remix albums: 1
- Budget compilations: 19 (UK)
- Gospel compilations: 8 (7 UK + 1 US)
- Foreign compilations: 22
- Box sets: 12

The albums discography of the British singer Cliff Richard consists of 49 studio albums (47 English and 2 German), seven soundtrack albums, three cast recording albums, 16 live albums, one remix album, 17 mainstream compilation albums, 19 budget-priced compilation albums, eight gospel compilation albums, 12 box sets, and 47 EPs. It also includes repackaged albums and foreign compilation albums (i.e. compilation albums that were not released in the UK).

It is reported that Richard's worldwide sales are 260 million, which makes him the second highest-selling British male solo artist worldwide of all time, after Elton John. Richard, together with his backing band the Shadows, were particularly dominant in the UK from 1958 to 1963 during the pre-Beatles era.

Richard's debut album, Cliff, was released in April 1959. It was recorded live at Abbey Road Studios before a small invited audience. It reached number four in the UK Albums Chart, spending over 30 non-consecutive weeks in the chart (then a top ten). His first studio album, Cliff Sings, was released in November 1959, with backing evenly split between the Shadows and the Norrie Paramor orchestra. Released in October 1960, Me and My Shadows was his first studio album in which he was backed by the Shadows fully throughout and without any cover songs.

After a string of three studio albums that peaked at number two, Richard achieved his first number-one with 21 Today in October 1961. The Young Ones soundtrack followed soon after in December 1961, spending six weeks at number one in the UK and becoming the first UK soundtrack to sell more than one million copies including international sales. In January 1963, the Summer Holiday soundtrack was released and became the peak of Richard's album success in the early 1960s, spending 14 weeks at number one in the UK with major success internationally (outside the US). As the Beatles's popularity took off, Richard's album chart success dropped off progressively, although his Wonderful Life soundtrack of 1964 reached number two, and most of his other studio albums continued to reach the top 10 through to 1966's Kinda Latin and Finders Keepers soundtrack.

Towards the end of the 1960s and the first half of the 1970s, Richard's album sales progressively waned and it was not until his 1976 album I'm Nearly Famous that Richard changed the focus of his recording career from singles to albums, leading to his first top-ten album of the 1970s. This led Richard to have a resurgence in popularity through the rest of the 1970s and 1980s in a period that saw his albums I'm Nearly Famous, Rock 'n' Roll Juvenile and I'm No Hero break the top 100 of the Billboard 200. Since 1987, Richard has reached the top 20 of the UK Albums Chart with all his studio albums and achieved his most recent number one with The Album in 1993.

In 2018, it was Richard's 60th year in the music industry and he released his first studio album of new recordings in 14 years, Rise Up, which was recorded after a battle with the BBC. In 2020, Richard released his 105th album, Music... The Air That I Breathe. The album entered the UK Albums Chart at number three, which saw Richard become the first artist to make the top five of the albums chart for eight consecutive decades. Richard's album Christmas with Cliff was released in November 2022 and is his third album consisting of Christmas music. Richard has achieved seven number-one albums on the UK Albums Chart in the 1960s, 1970s, 1980s and 1990s and has amassed 30 top-five albums and 47 top-ten albums.

Alongside his main 47 studio albums, Richard has also recorded two albums solely recorded in German which were only released in Germany (and German-speaking countries). Richard has also released innumerable compilation albums. In the discography below, the more significant of these have been split into sections. Under the 'Main compilation albums' section are the compilation albums that were released in the UK and charted. The second, 'Budget compilation albums', are the albums released on dedicated budget album labels or released at prices less than full price product (such as mid-price releases). Also included in this section are notable albums released by specialist re-issue record labels, which usually contain previously unreleased material or material previously unreleased on CD. The third section, 'Gospel compilation albums', consists of albums dedicated to gospel tracks only, or released by Christian music labels for the Contemporary Christian music market. The final section, 'Foreign compilation albums' consists of albums that were not released in the UK, but were released elsewhere and charted. The discography below also lists repackaged albums which are previously released albums, typically retitled, given a new cover and released with the same or predominantly the same track listing.

In 2023, marking his 65th anniversary, he released the album Cliff with Strings: My Kinda Life, a reworking of his classic hits reimagined in an orchestral arrangement.

== Studio albums ==
Title	Album details	Peak chart positions										Certifications
Title	Album details	UK	AUS	CAN	DEN	GER	NL	NOR	NZ	SWE	US	Certifications
Cliff Sings	Released: 6 November 1959; Label: Columbia; Formats: LP	2	—	—	—	—	—	—	—	—	—	
Me and My Shadows	Released: 7 October 1960; Label: Columbia; Formats: LP	2	—	—	—	33 (Note: Charted in Germany in 1964 after being reissued as Cliff.)	—	—	—	—	—	
Listen to Cliff!	Released: 14 April 1961; Label: Columbia; Formats: LP	2	—	—	—	—	—	—	—	—	—	
21 Today	Released: 14 October 1961; Label: Columbia; Formats: LP	1	—	—	—	—	—	—	—	—	—	
32 Minutes and 17 Seconds with Cliff Richard	Released: 14 September 1962; Label: Columbia; Formats: LP, reel-to-reel	3	—	1 (Note: The Canadian version of 32 Minutes and 17 Seconds with Cliff Richard was titled On Your Marks...Get Set...Let's Go!.)	—	—	—	13 (Note: Released well before Norway's first album chart which was published 2 February 1963.)	—	—	—	
When in Spain	Released: 6 September 1963; Label: Columbia; Formats: LP	8	—	—	—	—	—	5	—	—	—	
Cliff Richard	Released: April 1965; Label: Columbia; Formats: LP, reel-to-reel	9	—	—	—	—	—	17	—	—	—	
When in Rome	Released: August 1965; Label: Columbia; Formats: LP, reel-to-reel	—	—	—	—	—	—	—	—	—	—	
Love Is Forever	Released: November 1965; Label: Columbia; Formats: LP, reel-to-reel	19	—	—	—	—	—	—	—	—	—	
Kinda Latin	Released: May 1966; Label: Columbia; Formats: LP, reel-to-reel	9	—	—	—	—	—	—	—	—	—	
Don't Stop Me Now!	Released: April 1967; Label: Columbia; Formats: LP, reel-to-reel	23	—	—	—	—	—	—	—	—	—	
Good News (Note: Gospel album or album predominately made up of gospel or Christian songs.)	Released: October 1967; Label: Columbia; Formats: LP, reel-to-reel	37	—	—	—	—	—	—	—	—	—	
Established 1958 (Note: Established 1958 consists of five songs by Cliff Richard (without the Shadows) and five songs by the Shadows (without Richard).)	Released: September 1968; Label: Columbia; Formats: LP, reel-to-reel	30	14	—	—	—	—	—	—	—	—	
Sincerely	Released: September 1969; Label: Columbia; Formats: LP, reel-to-reel	24	—	—	—	—	—	—	—	—	—	
About That Man	Released: 31 July 1970; Label: Columbia; Formats: LP	—	—	—	—	—	—	—	—	—	—	
Tracks 'n Grooves	Released: 30 November 1970; Label: Columbia; Formats: LP, 8-track	37	—	—	—	—	—	—	—	—	—	
The 31st of February Street	Released: October 1974; Label: EMI; Formats: LP, MC, 8-track	—	—	—	—	—	—	—	—	—	—	
I'm Nearly Famous	Released: 7 May 1976; Label: EMI; Formats: LP, MC, 8-track	5	45	23	10	—	—	20	—	—	76	BPI: Gold
Every Face Tells a Story	Released: 18 March 1977; Label: EMI; Formats: LP, MC, 8-track	8	26	—	—	—	—	—	36	—	—	
Small Corners	Released: March 1978; Label: EMI; Formats: LP, MC	33	—	—	—	—	—	—	—	—	—	
Green Light	Released: 29 September 1978; Label: EMI; Formats: LP, MC, 8-track	25	—	—	—	—	—	—	—	—	—	
Rock 'n' Roll Juvenile	Released: 7 September 1979; Label: EMI; Formats: LP, MC	3	28	35	—	6	20	10	41	44	93	BPI: Gold
I'm No Hero	Released: 1 September 1980; Label: EMI; Formats: LP, MC	4	28	25	—	14	17	16	—	36	80	BPI: Gold; MC: Platinum
Wired for Sound	Released: 14 September 1981; Label: EMI; Formats: LP, MC	4	13	23	—	44	—	22	4	39	132	BPI: Platinum; ARIA: Platinum; MC: Gold; RMNZ: Gold
Now You See Me, Now You Don't	Released: 30 August 1982; Label: EMI; Formats: LP, MC	4	21	—	1	—	—	—	19	—	209	BPI: Gold
Silver	Released: 3 October 1983; Label: EMI; Formats: LP, 2×LP, MC, 2×MC	7	65	—	—	57	42	18	47	—	—	BPI: Gold; RMNZ: Gold
The Rock Connection (Note: Part new songs, part compilation of previously released songs.)	Released: 19 November 1984; Label: EMI; Formats: CD, LP, MC	43	30	—	—	—	—	—	21	—	—	BPI: Silver
Always Guaranteed	Released: 14 September 1987; Label: EMI; Formats: CD, LP, MC	5	6	—	4 (Note: Always Guaranteed was released before Denmark's Radio restarted the Top 20 album chart in the first week of 1988.)	9	19	—	3	49	—	BPI: Platinum; ARIA: Platinum; RMNZ: Gold
Stronger	Released: 30 October 1989; Label: EMI; Formats: CD, LP, MC	7	16	—	2	53	—	—	3	—	—	BPI: Platinum; ARIA: Gold; RMNZ: Platinum
Together with Cliff Richard	Released: 18 November 1991; Label: EMI; Formats: CD, LP, MC	10	—	—	—	—	—	—	2	—	—	BPI: Platinum; RMNZ: 2× Platinum
The Album	Released: 19 April 1993; Label: EMI; Formats: CD, LP, MC	1	72	—	20	—	—	—	11	—	—	BPI: Gold
Songs from Heathcliff	Released: 30 October 1995; Label: EMI; Formats: CD, MC	15	—	—	—	—	—	—	50	—	—	BPI: Gold
Real as I Wanna Be	Released: 19 October 1998; Label: EMI; Formats: CD, MC	10	91	—	—	—	100	—	27	—	—	BPI: Silver; RMNZ: Gold
Wanted	Released: 5 November 2001; Label: Papillon; Formats: CD, MC	11	—	—	12	—	—	—	46	—	—	BPI: Gold
Cliff at Christmas	Released: 17 November 2003; Label: EMI; Formats: CD	9	—	—	6	—	—	—	41	59	—	BPI: Platinum
Something's Goin' On	Released: 25 October 2004; Label: Decca; Formats: CD, MC	7	—	—	23	—	67	—	—	—	—	BPI: Gold
Two's Company: The Duets	Released: 6 November 2006; Label: EMI; Formats: CD	8	—	—	16	—	—	—	9	—	—	BPI: Gold; RMNZ: Gold
Love... The Album	Released: 12 November 2007; Label: EMI; Formats: CD	13	—	—	—	—	—	—	28	—	—	BPI: Gold
Reunited – Cliff Richard and the Shadows	Released: 21 September 2009; Label: EMI; Formats: CD, 2×CD	4	40	—	20	—	72	—	7	54	—	BPI: Gold
Bold as Brass	Released: 11 October 2010; Label: EMI; Formats: CD, LP, digital download	3	—	—	23	—	79	—	13	—	—	BPI: Silver
Soulicious	Released: 10 October 2011; Label: EMI; Formats: CD, digital download	10	—	—	—	—	90	—	—	—	—	BPI: Silver
The Fabulous Rock 'n' Roll Songbook	Released: 11 November 2013; Label: Rhino; Formats: CD, digital download	7	7	—	37	—	86	—	—	—	—	BPI: Gold
Just... Fabulous Rock 'n' Roll	Released: 11 November 2016; Label: Sony Music; Formats: CD, LP, digital download	4	15	—	—	—	82	—	— (Note: Just... Fabulous Rock 'n' Roll did not enter the NZ Top 40 Albums Chart, but peaked at number 4 on the NZ Heatseekers Albums Chart.)	—	—	BPI: Gold
Rise Up	Released: 23 November 2018; Label: Warner Music; Formats: CD, digital download	4	—	—	—	—	62	—	—	—	—	BPI: Gold
Music... The Air That I Breathe	Released: 30 October 2020; Label: East West; Formats: CD, digital download	3	59	—	—	—	—	—	—	—	—	BPI: Silver
Christmas with Cliff	Released: 25 November 2022; Label: East West; Formats: CD, LP, digital download	2	—	—	—	—	61	—	40	—	—	BPI: Silver
Cliff with Strings – My Kinda Life	Released: 3 November 2023; Label: East West; Formats: CD, LP, digital download	5	—	—	—	—	—	—	—	—	—	
Only Number Ones	Released: 27 November 2026; Label: Parlophone; Formats: CD, LP, digital download	—	—	—	—	—	—	—	—	—	—	
"—" denotes releases that did not chart or were not released in that territory.

== German studio albums ==
Title	Album details
Hier ist Cliff	Released: May 1969; Label: Hörzu; Formats: LP
Ich träume deine Träume	Released: March 1971; Label: Columbia; Formats: LP

== Soundtrack albums ==
Title	Album details	Peak chart positions			
Title	Album details	UK	AUS	CAN	NOR
The Young Ones	Released: 15 December 1961; Label: Columbia; Formats: LP, reel-to-reel	1	—	—	19
Summer Holiday	Released: 18 January 1963; Label: Columbia; Formats: LP, reel-to-reel	1	—	1	1
Wonderful Life	Released: 3 July 1964; Label: Columbia; Formats: LP, reel-to-reel	2	5	—	4
Finders Keepers	Released: 9 December 1966; Label: Columbia; Formats: LP, reel-to-reel	6	—	—	—
Two a Penny	Released: August 1968; Label: Columbia; Formats: LP, MC	—	—	—	—
His Land	Released: 27 November 1970; Label: Columbia; Formats: LP	—	—	—	—
Take Me High	Released: December 1973; Label: Columbia; Formats: LP	41	—	—	—
"—" denotes releases that did not chart or were not released in that territory.

== Cast recording albums ==
Title	Album details	Peak chart positions		Certifications
Title	Album details	UK	NOR	Certifications
Aladdin and His Wonderful Lamp	Released: December 1964; Label: Columbia; Formats: LP, reel-to-reel	13	11	
Cinderella	Released: January 1967; Label: Columbia; Formats: LP, reel-to-reel	30	—	
Heathcliff Live (The Show)	Released: 2 December 1996; Label: EMI; Formats: 2×CD, 2×MC	41	—	BPI: Silver
"—" denotes releases that did not chart or were not released in that territory.

== Live albums ==
Title	Album details	Peak chart positions				Certifications
Title	Album details	UK	AUS	GER	NZ	Certifications
Cliff	Released: April 1959; Label: Columbia; Formats: LP	4	—	—	—	
Cliff in Japan	Released: May 1968; Label: Columbia; Formats: LP	29	—	—	—	
Cliff: Live at the Talk of the Town	Released: July 1970; Label: Regal; Formats: LP, MC, 8-track	—	—	—	—	
Cliff Live in Japan '72 (Note: Japan double-album release; not released in the UK in its original form. Retitled as Cliff Goes East for release in Southeast Asia and New Zealand. Subsequently, repackaged in 1976 as a single album titled Live! (or Live) in numerous countries, including the UK. Eventually released in the UK on 10 April 2010 (on CD) with original title, sleeve and track listing.)	Released: February 1973; Label: Odeon; Formats: 2×LP	—	—	—	—	
Help It Along	Released: June 1974; Label: EMI; Formats: LP, MC	—	—	—	—	
Japan Tour '74 (Note: Japan double-album release; not released in the UK in its original form. Eventually released in the UK on 6 April 2009 (on CD) with original title, sleeve and track listing.)	Released: July 1975; Label: EMI; Formats: 2×LP	—	—	—	—	
Thank You Very Much	Released: February 1979; Label: EMI; Formats: LP, MC, 8-track	5	—	—	—	BPI: Gold
Dressed for the Occasion	Released: 9 May 1983; Label: EMI; Formats: LP, MC	7	30	—	—	BPI: Silver
From a Distance: The Event (Note: Includes two studio-recorded tracks and a heavily remixed version of "We Don't Talk Anymore".)	Released: 5 November 1990; Label: Columbia; Formats: CD, 2×LP, MC	3	21	65	7	BPI: 2× Platinum; RMNZ: Platinum
Live at the ABC Kingston 1962	Released: 4 March 2002; Label: EMI; Formats: CD	128	—	—	—	
Cliff Richard — The World Tour	Released: 5 April 2004; Label: EMI; Formats: CD	167	—	—	—	
From a Distance: The Event (reconfigured version)	Released: 21 March 2005; Label: EMI; Formats: 2×CD	—	—	—	—	
Let Me Tell You Baby...It's Called Rock 'N' Roll!	Released: 31 October 2012; Label: Rollercoaster; Formats: 2×CD, 10-inch LP	—	—	—	—	
The Final Reunion	Released: 19 April 2024; Label: Demon; Formats: 2×CD	—	—	—	—	
Live in Berlin 1970 (The Broadcast Archives)	Released: 11 October 2024; Format: Digital	—	—	—	—	
Live in London 1980 (The Broadcast Archives)	Released: 30 May 2025; Format: Digital	—	—	—	—	
"—" denotes releases that did not chart or were not released in that territory.

== Remix albums ==
Title	Album details
My Kinda Life	Released: 18 May 1992; Label: EMI; Formats: CD, MC

== Compilation albums ==
=== Main compilation albums ===
Title	Album details	Peak chart positions									Certifications
Title	Album details	UK	AUS	CAN	DEN	FIN	GER	NL	NOR	NZ	Certifications
Cliff's Hit Album	Released: 5 July 1963; Label: Columbia; Formats: LP, reel-to-reel	2	—	1 (Note: The Canadian version of Cliff's Hit Album was titled Living Doll.)	—	—	—	—	3	—	
More Hits by Cliff	Released: July 1965; Label: Columbia; Formats: LP, reel-to-reel	20	—	—	—	6	—	—	16	—	
The Best of Cliff	Released: June 1969; Label: Columbia; Formats: LP, reel-to-reel	5	—	—	—	—	—	—	—	—	
The Best of Cliff Volume 2	Released: November 1972; Label: Columbia; Formats: LP, MC, 8-track	49	—	—	—	—	—	—	—	—	
40 Golden Greats	Released: 30 September 1977; Label: EMI; Formats: 2×LP, 2×MC	1	—	—	—	—	30	—	—	—	BPI: Platinum
Love Songs	Released: 15 June 1981; Label: EMI; Formats: LP, MC	1	1	—	—	30	—	—	—	2	BPI: Platinum; ARIA: Platinum; RMNZ: Platinum
Cliff and the Shadows: 20 Original Greats	Released: 2 July 1984; Label: EMI; Formats: LP, MC	43	—	—	—	—	—	—	—	—	
Private Collection: 1979–1988	Released: 7 November 1988; Label: EMI; Formats: CD, 2×LP, MC	1	10	—	—	—	—	—	—	6	BPI: 4× Platinum; ARIA: Platinum; RMNZ: 4× Platinum
The Hit List	Released: 3 October 1994; Label: EMI; Formats: 2×CD, 2×MC	3	2	—	—	—	—	38	—	5	BPI: Platinum; ARIA: Gold; RMNZ: 2× Platinum
Cliff Richard at the Movies 1959–1974	Released: 29 July 1996; Label: EMI; Formats: 2×CD, 2×MC	17	—	—	—	—	—	—	—	—	
The Rock and Roll Years	Released: 21 July 1997; Label: EMI; Formats: CD, MC	32	—	—	—	—	—	—	—	—	
The Whole Story: His Greatest Hits	Released: 9 October 2000; Label: EMI; Formats: 2×CD, 2×MC	6	26	—	—	—	—	—	—	12	BPI: Platinum; RMNZ: Gold
The Platinum Collection	Released: 14 November 2005; Label: EMI; Formats: 3×CD	51	—	—	—	—	—	—	—	—	BPI: Gold
The 50th Anniversary Album	Released: 3 November 2008; Label: EMI; Formats: 2×CD	11	—	—	12	—	—	—	—	26	BPI: Gold
75 at 75	Released: 18 September 2015; Label: Rhino; Formats: 3×CD, digital download	4	—	—	—	—	—	63	—	—	BPI: Gold
Stronger Thru the Years	Released: 10 November 2017; Label: Parlophone; Formats: 2×CD, digital download	14	—	—	—	—	—	—	—	—	BPI: Silver
Cliff Richard and the Shadows: The Best of the Rock 'n' Roll Pioneers	Released: 29 November 2019; Label: Parlophone; Formats: 2×CD, 2×LP, digital download	11	—	—	—	—	—	—	—	—	BPI: Silver
"—" denotes releases that did not chart or were not released in that territory.

=== Budget compilation albums ===
Title	Album details
Rock on with Cliff	Released: April 1980; Label: Music for Pleasure; Formats: LP, MC
Cliff in the 60s	Released: May 1984; Label: Music for Pleasure; Formats: LP, MC
From the Heart	Released: April 1985; Label: Tellydisc; Formats: 2×LP, MC
The EP Collection: Ballads and Love Songs	Released: 29 September 1989; Label: See for Miles; Formats: CD, LP, MC
25 of the Best of Cliff Richard	Released: June 1997; Label: EMI/Music for Pleasure; Formats: LP, MC
The Hits in Between	Released: 7 September 1998; Label: EMI; Formats: CD
1960s	Released: 12 October 1998; Label: EMI; Formats: CD
1970s	Released: 12 October 1998; Label: EMI; Formats: CD
1980s	Released: 12 October 1998; Label: EMI; Formats: CD
1950s	Released: 24 June 2002; Label: EMI; Formats: CD
1990s	Released: 24 June 2002; Label: EMI; Formats: CD
My Songs	Released: 18 August 2003; Label: EMI; Formats: CD
Sings the Standards	Released: 18 August 2003; Label: EMI; Formats: CD
Rare 'B' Sides 1963–1989	Released: 6 April 2009; Label: EMI; Formats: CD
Lost & Found (From the Archives)	Released: 6 April 2009; Label: EMI; Formats: CD
Rare EP Tracks 1961–1991	Released: 12 April 2010; Label: EMI; Formats: CD
The Early Years	Released: 12 April 2010; Label: EMI; Formats: CD
The Collection	Released: 5 July 2010; Label: EMI; Formats: 2×CD

=== Gospel compilation albums ===
Title	Album details	Peak chart positions
Title	Album details	UK
Walking in the Light	Released: August 1984; Label: Myrrh; Formats: CD, LP, MC	—
It's a Small World	Released: November 1985; Label: Myrrh; Formats: CD, LP, MC	—
Hymns and Inspirational Songs	Released: August 1986; Label: Word; Formats: CD, LP, MC	—
Carols	Released: 7 November 1988; Label: World; Formats: LP, MC	—
The Winner	Released: April 1995; Label: Alliance Music; Formats: CD, MC	121
Yesterday Today Forever	Released: 14 September 1998; Label: Alliance Music; Formats: 2×CD	—
Rockspel	Released: 27 January 2003; Label: Kingsway Music; Formats: CD	—
Healing Love (Songs of Inspiration)	Released: 3 April 2007; Label: Music Mill; Formats: CD; US-only release	—
"—" denotes releases that did not chart or were not released in that territory.

=== Foreign compilation albums ===
Title	Album details	Peak chart positions										Certifications
Title	Album details	AUS	AUT	DEN	FIN	GER	NL	NOR	NZ	SWE	US	Certifications
Cliff's Greatest	Released: 1963; Label: Columbia; Formats: LP	—	—	—	—	15	—	—	—	—	—	
It's All in the Game	Released: March 1964; Label: Epic; Formats: LP	—	—	—	—	—	—	—	—	—	115	
Cliff International	Released: 1964; Label: Columbia; Formats: LP	—	—	—	—	27	—	11	—	—	—	
Power to All Our Friends	Released: 1973; Label: EMI; Formats: LP, MC	—	—	—	28	—	—	17	—	—	—	
Seine grossen Erfolge	Released: 1974; Label: Columbia/EMI; Formats: LP	—	—	—	—	—	—	—	—	—	—	
Cliff Richard's 20 Golden Greats	Released: 1977; Label: EMI; Formats: LP, MC	61	—	—	—	—	—	—	—	—	—	
Move It – Seine besten Songs	Released: 1979; Label: Arcade/EMI; Formats: LP, MC	—	4	—	—	—	—	—	—	—	—	
Grootste Hits	Released: January 1981; Label: EMI; Formats: LP, MC; Released in Scandinavia and Finland as 18 Greatest Hits	—	—	—	7	—	5	—	—	—	—	IFPI FIN: Gold
1958–1981	Released: 1981; Label: EMI; Formats: LP, MC	—	—	—	—	—	—	—	1	—	—	RMNZ: Platinum
25 Years of Gold	Released: February 1983; Label: EMI; Formats: LP, MC	1	—	—	—	—	—	—	—	—	—	
Remember Me	Released: October 1987; Label: Columbia; Formats: CD, 2×LP, 2×MC	6	17	—	—	12	74	—	—	—	—	
Their 40 Big Ones	Released: December 1987; Label: EMI; Formats: 2×LP, 2×MC	—	—	—	—	—	—	—	12	—	—	RMNZ: Gold
The Definitive Rock & Roll Album	Released: February 1989; Label: EVA; Formats: 2×CD, 2×LP, 2×MC	—	—	—	—	—	86	—	—	—	—	
The Definitive Film & Musical Album	Released: February 1989; Label: EVA; Formats: 2×CD, 2×LP, 2×MC	—	—	—	—	—	79	—	—	—	—	
The Definitive Hit Album	Released: February 1989; Label: EVA; Formats: 2×CD, 2×LP, 2×MC	—	—	—	—	—	86	—	—	—	—	
The Definitive Love Album	Released: February 1989; Label: EVA; Formats: 2×CD, 2×LP, 2×MC	—	—	—	—	—	68	—	—	—	—	
Meine großen Erfolge	Released: December 1994; Label: EMI; Formats: CD	—	—	—	—	81	—	—	—	—	—	
Pure Gold – Det Beste av det Beste	Released: 1995; Label: EMI; Formats: CD	—	—	—	—	—	—	4	—	—	—	IFPI NOR: Gold
Miss You Nights	Released: 1998; Label: CMC; Formats: CD	—	—	11	—	—	—	—	—	—	—	
40 Years of Hits in Holland	Released: April 1998; Label: EMI; Formats: CD	—	—	—	—	—	9	—	—	—	—	NVPI: Gold
40 Jahre – 40 Hits	Released: September 1998; Label: EMI; Formats: 2×CD	—	—	—	—	37	—	—	—	—	—	
My Danish Collection	Released: 2000; Label: CMC; Formats: 2×CD; Released in Sweden as My Swedish Collection and Norway as My Norwegian Collection	—	—	6	—	—	—	15	—	22	—	
"—" denotes releases that did not chart or were not released in that territory.

== Box sets ==
Title	Album details	Peak chart positions		Certifications
Title	Album details	UK	AUS	Certifications
The Cliff Richard Story	Released: February 1974; Label: World/EMI; Formats: 6×LP, 6×MC	—	—	BPI: Gold
Cliff	Released: 19 February 1982; Label: Columbia/EMI; Formats: 12×7"	—	—	
The Best of Cliff Richard & the Shadows	Released: 1984; Label: Reader's Digest; Formats: 8×LP, 3×MC	—	—	BPI: Gold
The Cliff Richard Collection	Released: 1991; Label: EMI; Formats: 5×CD; Australia-only release	—	25	
The Rock 'n' Roll Years 1958–1963	Released: 9 June 1997; Label: EMI; Formats: 4×CD, 4×MC	—	—	
On the Continent	Released: November 1997; Label: Bear Family; Formats: 5×CD; Germany-only release	—	—	
40th Anniversary – Complete	Released: February 1998; Label: EMI; Formats: 5×CD; Australia-only release	—	24	
The Singles Collection	Released: 12 August 2002; Label: EMI; Formats: 6×CD	188	—	
And They Said It Wouldn't Last: My 50 Years in Music	Released: 15 September 2008; Label: EMI; Formats: 8×CD+10"	—	—	
Move It – The Best of the Early Years	Released: October 2011; Label: Delta; Formats: 3×CD	96	—	
Hot Hundred	Released: October 2013; Label: Delta; Formats: 4×CD	103	—	
Original Album Series	Released: 17 June 2016; Label: Parlophone; Formats: 5×CD	—	—	
"—" denotes releases that did not chart or were not released in that territory.

== Repackaged albums ==
Title	Album details	Certifications
How Wonderful to Know	Released: 1964; Label: World Record Club; Formats: LP, reel-to-reel; Repackaging of 21 Today	
It'll Be Me	Released: November 1969; Label: Regal; Formats: LP; Repackaging of 32 Minutes and 17 Seconds with Cliff Richard	
All My Love	Released: September 1970; Label: Music for Pleasure; Formats: LP; Repackaging of Cliff Richard	
Everyone Needs Someone to Love	Released: June 1975; Label: Sounds Superb; Formats: LP, MC; Repackaging of Love Is Forever	
Live!	Released: 1 October 1976; Label: Music for Pleasure; Formats: LP, MC; Repackaging of Cliff Live in Japan '72	BPI: Silver
Carols & Christmas Songs	Released: October 1995; Label: Alliance Music; Formats: CD; Repackaging of Carols	

== EPs ==
Title	EP details	Peak chart positions	
Title	EP details	UK (Note: Later deemed the official chart for the period, Record Retailer introduced an EP chart on 12 March 1960 which remained until its discontinuation at the end of 1967. EPs that were released before March 1960 but appeared on this first chart have their highest position shown in parentheses to indicate the position is not necessarily a true indication of the album's sales performance since its release date.)	AUS
Serious Charge	Released: May 1959; Label: Columbia; Formats: 7"	—	—
Cliff (No.1)	Released: June 1959; Label: Columbia; Formats: 7"	—	—
Cliff (No.2)	Released: July 1959; Label: Columbia; Formats: 7"	—	—
Expresso Bongo	Released: 8 January 1960; Label: Columbia; Formats: 7"	(1) (Note: Prior to the inception of the EP chart, Expresso Bongo peaked at number 14 on the UK Singles Chart.)	—
Cliff Sings (No.1)	Released: January 1960; Label: Columbia; Formats: 7"	(4)	—
Cliff Sings (No.2)	Released: February 1960; Label: Columbia; Formats: 7"	(3)	—
Cliff Sings (No.3)	Released: June 1960; Label: Columbia; Formats: 7"	2	—
Cliff Sings (No.4)	Released: September 1960; Label: Columbia; Formats: 7"	—	—
Cliff's Silver Discs	Released: 2 December 1960; Label: Columbia; Formats: 7"	1	—
Me & My Shadows (No.1)	Released: February 1961; Label: Columbia; Formats: 7"	5	—
Me & My Shadows (No.2)	Released: March 1961; Label: Columbia; Formats: 7"	8	—
Me & My Shadows (No.3)	Released: April 1961; Label: Columbia; Formats: 7"	6	—
Listen to Cliff (No.1)	Released: September 1961; Label: Columbia; Formats: 7"	17	—
Dream	Released: November 1961; Label: Columbia; Formats: 7"	3	—
Listen to Cliff (No.2)	Released: November 1961; Label: Columbia; Formats: 7"	—	—
Cliff's Hit Parade	Released: February 1962; Label: Columbia; Formats: 7"	4	—
Cliff Richard (No.1)	Released: March 1962; Label: Columbia; Formats: 7"	—	—
Hits from The Young Ones	Released: April 1962; Label: Columbia; Formats: 7"	1	—
Cliff Richard (No.2)	Released: June 1962; Label: Columbia; Formats: 7"	19	—
Cliff's Hits	Released: November 1962; Label: Columbia; Formats: 7"	—	—
Time for Cliff & the Shadows	Released: 1 March 1963; Label: Columbia; Formats: 7"	—	—
Holiday Carnival	Released: May 1963; Label: Columbia; Formats: 7"	1	—
Hits from Summer Holiday	Released: June 1963; Label: Columbia; Formats: 7"	4	—
More Hits from Summer Holiday	Released: 6 September 1963; Label: Columbia; Formats: 7"	—	—
Cliff's Lucky Lips	Released: October 1963; Label: Columbia; Formats: 7"	17	—
Love Songs	Released: 1 November 1963; Label: Columbia; Formats: 7"	4	—
When in France	Released: February 1964; Label: Columbia; Formats: 7"	—	—
Cliff Sings Don't Talk to Him	Released: March 1964; Label: Columbia; Formats: 7"	15	—
Cliff's Palladium Successes	Released: May 1964; Label: Columbia; Formats: 7"	—	—
Wonderful Life (No.1)	Released: August 1964; Label: Columbia; Formats: 7"	3	58
A Forever Kind of Love	Released: September 1964; Label: Columbia; Formats: 7"	—	—
Wonderful Life (No.2)	Released: October 1964; Label: Columbia; Formats: 7"	—	—
Hits from Wonderful Life (No.3)	Released: December 1964; Label: Columbia; Formats: 7"	—	—
Why Don't They Understand?	Released: February 1965; Label: Columbia; Formats: 7"	—	—
Cliff's Hits from Aladdin and His Wonderful Lamp	Released: 5 March 1965; Label: Columbia; Formats: 7"	20	—
Look in My Eyes Maria	Released: May 1965; Label: Columbia; Formats: 7"	15	—
Angel	Released: September 1965; Label: Columbia; Formats: 7"	—	—
Take Four	Released: October 1965; Label: Columbia; Formats: 7"	4	—
Wind Me Up	Released: 4 February 1966; Label: Columbia; Formats: 7"	—	—
Hits from When in Rome	Released: 1 April 1966; Label: Columbia; Formats: 7"	—	—
Love Is Forever	Released: June 1966; Label: Columbia; Formats: 7"	—	—
Thunderbirds Are Go!	Released: 11 November 1966; Label: Columbia; Formats: 7"	—	—
La La La La La	Released: November 1966; Label: Columbia; Formats: 7"	—	—
Cinderella	Released: May 1967; Label: Columbia; Formats: 7"	—	—
Carol Singers	Released: November 1967; Label: Columbia; Formats: 7"	—	—
Congratulations – Cliff Sings 6 Songs for Europe	Released: 17 May 1968; Label: Columbia; Formats: 7"	—	—
Christmas EP	Released: 9 December 1991; Label: EMI; Formats: 7", 2×7"	—	—
"—" denotes releases that did not chart or were not released in that territory.

== See also ==
- Cliff Richard singles discography
- Cliff Richard videography
