= Cliff Richard videography =

Cliff Richard video discography
- Video albums: 38
- Music videos: 62
- Video compilation albums: 1
- Video box sets: 3
- Video album reissues: 9

The videography of the British singer Cliff Richard consists of 38 video albums, one video compilation album, three video box sets, and 62 music videos. A number of these albums have been reissued and subsequently recharted. Richard's first music video was for his 1976 single "Miss You Nights", which coincided with his resurgence in popularity.

== Video albums ==
| Title | Album details | Peak chart positions | | | | | | | | Certifications |
| Title | Album details | UK Video | UK DVD | UK Music | AUS | IRE | NL | NZ | SWE | Certifications |
|---|---|---|---|---|---|---|---|---|---|---|
| Thank You Very Much (with the Shadows) | Released: October 1981; Label: Picture Music/EMI; Formats: VHS | — | — | — | — | — | — | — | — | |
| The Video Connection | Released: November 1983; Label: Picture Music/EMI; Formats: VHS, Beta, LD | — | — | 2 | — | — | — | — | — | |
| Together – Cliff & the Shadows 1984 | Released: November 1984; Label: Picture Music International; Formats: VHS, Beta, LD | — | — | 1 | — | — | — | — | — | |
| Rock in Australia | Released: December 1986; Label: Picture Music International; Formats: VHS, Beta | — | — | 2 | — | — | — | — | — | |
| Always Guaranteed (EP) | Released: April 1988; Label: PMI Video Collection; Formats: VHS | — | — | 6 | — | — | — | — | — | |
| Private Collection | Released: November 1988; Label: Picture Music International; Formats: VHS, LD, V-CD | — | — | 1 | — | — | — | — | — | |
| Live & Guaranteed 1988! | Released: March 1989; Label: Picture Music International; Formats: VHS | — | — | 3 | — | — | — | — | — | |
| From a Distance: The Event | Released: November 1990; Label: Picture Music International; Formats: VHS | — | — | 2 | — | — | — | — | — | ARIA: Platinum |
| Together with Cliff Richard | Released: 18 November 1991; Label: Picture Music International; Formats: VHS | — | — | 2 | — | — | — | — | — | |
| When the Music Stops | Released: March 1993; Label: Wienerworld; Formats: VHS | — | — | 2 | — | — | — | — | — | |
| Access All Areas | Released: 12 April 1993; Label: Picture Music International; Formats: 2xVHS, 2xLD | — | — | 1 | — | — | — | — | — | |
| The Story So Far | Released: 15 November 1993; Label: Picture Music International; Formats: VHS | — | — | 3 | — | — | — | — | — | |
| The Hit List | Released: 3 October 1994; Label: Picture Music International; Formats: VHS | 12 | — | 2 | — | — | — | — | — | UK: Platinum |
| Christmas with Cliff Richard | Released: 7 November 1994; Label: Wienerworld; Formats: VHS | — | — | 20 | — | — | — | — | — | |
| The Hit List – Live | Released: 16 October 1995; Label: Picture Music International; Formats: VHS | 29 | — | 3 | — | — | — | — | — | UK: Gold |
| Cliff at the Movies | Released: 4 October 1996; Label: PolyGram Video; Formats: VHS | 36 | — | 6 | — | — | — | — | — | UK: Gold |
| Heathcliff | Released: 6 October 1997; Label: Video Collection International; Formats: VHS | 7 | 87 | 1 | — | — | — | — | — | UK: 5× Platinum |
| The Making of Heathcliff | Released: 6 April 1998; Label: Video Collection International; Formats: VHS | 72 | — | 2 | — | — | — | — | — | |
| 40th Anniversary Concert | Released: 2 November 1998; Label: Video Collection International; Formats: VHS | 24 | — | 3 | — | — | 10 | — | — | UK: 3× Platinum |
| Live in the Park | Released: 8 November 1999; Label: Video Collection International; Formats: VHS | 22 | — | 2 | — | — | 16 | — | — | UK: 3× Platinum; AUS: Platinum |
| An Audience with Cliff Richard | Released: 20 March 2000; Label: Video Collection International; Formats: VHS | 52 | — | 1 | — | — | — | — | — | |
| The Countdown Concert | Released: 16 October 2000; Label: Video Collection International; Formats: VHS | 8 | — | 2 | — | — | — | — | — | UK: 2× Platinum; AUS: Platinum |
| Unforgettable | Released: 12 November 2001; Label: Video Collection International; Formats: DVD, VHS | 50 | — | 4 | — | — | — | — | — | UK: Platinum |
| The Hits I Missed | Released: 18 March 2002; Label: Video Collection International; Formats: VHS | — | — | 3 | — | — | — | — | — | |
| Cliff – World Tour 2003 | Released: 13 October 2003; Label: Video Collection International; Formats: DVD, VHS | 31 | 49 | 1 | — | — | — | 1 | — | UK: 2× Platinum; AUS: Gold; NZ: Platinum |
| Castles in the Air | Released: 11 October 2004; Label: Universal; Formats: DVD, VHS | 16 | 16 | 1 | — | — | — | 3 | — | UK: 2× Platinum |
| On the Beach | Released: 21 March 2005; Label: Universal; Formats: DVD, VHS | — | — | — | — | — | — | — | — | |
| Live Here and Now | Released: 27 November 2006; Label: Universal; Formats: DVD | 41 | 41 | 3 | — | — | — | — | — | UK: Platinum |
| Time Machine Tour 50th Anniversary | Released: 1 December 2008; Label: Universal; Formats: DVD | 40 | 38 | 1 | — | — | — | — | — | UK: Platinum |
| The Final Reunion (with the Shadows) | Released: 9 November 2009; Label: 2 Entertain; Formats: DVD, Blu-ray | 7 | 7 | 1 | 1 | — | 1 | — | 1 | UK: 4× Platinum; AUS: 2× Platinum; DEN: Gold |
| Rare and Unseen | Released: 29 March 2010; Label: Wienerworld; Formats: DVD | — | — | 4 | — | — | — | — | — | |
| Bold as Brass | Released: 22 November 2010; Label: 2 Entertain; Formats: DVD, Blu-ray | 35 | 33 | 1 | — | — | 18 | — | — | UK: Platinum |
| The Soulicious Tour | Released: 14 November 2011; Label: Universal; Formats: DVD | 29 | 28 | 2 | 24 | — | — | — | — | UK: Platinum |
| Live in Berlin | Released: 13 May 2013; Label: ZYX Music; Formats: DVD | — | — | — | — | — | — | — | — | |
| Still Reelin' and a-Rockin' – Live in Sydney | Released: 11 November 2013; Label: Universal; Formats: DVD, Blu-ray | 33 | 29 | 1 | 5 | — | 6 | — | 7 | UK: Gold |
| Cliff Richard 75th Birthday Concert | Released: 30 November 2015; Label: Spirit Entertainment; Formats: DVD, Blu-ray | 26 | 23 | 1 | 2 | — | 15 | — | — | UK: Platinum |
| 60th Anniversary Concert | Released: 19 November 2018; Label: Spirit Entertainment; Formats: DVD, Blu-ray | 13 | 9 | 1 | — | 1 | 3 | — | — | UK: Gold |
| The Great 80 Tour | Released: 6 December 2021; Label: Spirit Entertainment; Formats: DVD, Blu-ray, digital download | 4 | 1 | 1 | — | 2 | — | — | — | |
| The Blue Sapphire Tour | Released: 18 December 2023; Label: Spirit Entertainment; Formats: DVD, Blu-ray, digital download | 8 | 6 | 1 | — | 2 | — | — | — | |
"—" denotes releases that did not chart or were not released in that territory.

== Video album reissues ==
| Title | Album details | Peak chart positions | |
| Title | Album details | UK Music | AUS |
|---|---|---|---|
| Thank You Very Much (with the Shadows) | Released: November 1989; Label: Music Club/Picture Music International; Formats: VHS | 2 | — |
| Rock in Australia | Released: May 1991; Label: Music Club/Picture Music International; Formats: VHS | 6 | — |
| The Video Connection | Released: April 1992; Label: Music Club/Picture Music International; Formats: VHS | 10 | — |
| Oh Boy! | Released: October 1993; Label: Music Club/Picture Music International; Formats: VHS; Reissue of From a Distance part 1 | 19 | — |
| Live & Guaranteed 1988! | Released: March 1995; Label: Picture Music International; Formats: VHS+CD | 17 | — |
| Cliff at the Movies | Released: June 1998; Label: PolyGram Video; Formats: VHS | 13 | — |
| From a Distance: The Event | Released: 18 March 2005; Label: EMI; Formats: DVD | 3 | 30 |
| 40th Anniversary Concert | Released: 31 October 2005; Label: Demon Vision; Formats: DVD | 8 | — |
| Live in the Park | Released: 31 October 2005; Label: Demon Vision; Formats: DVD | 12 | — |
"—" denotes releases that did not chart or were not released in that territory.

== Video compilation albums ==
| Title | Album details | Peak chart positions |
| Title | Album details | UK Music |
|---|---|---|
| The Story of Cliff Richard | Released: 3 October 2011; Label: IMC Vision; Formats: DVD | 10 |

== Video box sets ==
| Title | Album details | Peak chart positions |
| Title | Album details | UK Music |
|---|---|---|
| The Cliff Richard Box | Released: March 2006; Label: Demon Vision; Formats: 4xDVD | 24 |
| Live 2004–2006 | Released: 26 November 2007; Label: Universal; Formats: 3xDVD | — |
| The Concert Collection | Released: 17 November 2014; Label: Universal; Formats: 3xDVD | 5 |
"—" denotes releases that did not chart.

== Music videos ==
| Title | Year | Director |
|---|---|---|
| "Miss You Nights" | 1976 | Unknown |
| "Devil Woman" | 1976 | Unknown |
| "I Can't Ask for Anymore Than You" | 1976 | Unknown |
| "Hey Mr. Dream Maker" | 1977 | Unknown |
| "My Kinda Life" | 1977 | Unknown |
| "When Two Worlds Drift Apart" | 1977 | Unknown |
| "Green Light" | 1979 | Unknown |
| "We Don't Talk Anymore" | 1979 | Brian Grant |
| "Hot Shot" | 1979 | Brian Grant |
| "Carrie" | 1980 | Brian Grant |
| "Dreamin'" | 1980 | Brian Grant |
| "Suddenly" (with Olivia Newton-John) | 1980 | Jeff Margolis |
| "A Little in Love" | 1980 | Unknown |
| "Wired for Sound" | 1981 | Unknown |
| "Daddy's Home" | 1981 | Keith McMillan |
| "The Only Way Out" | 1982 | Keith McMillan |
| "Where Do We Go from Here" | 1982 | Unknown |
| "Never Say Die (Give a Little Bit More)" | 1983 | Russell Mulcahy |
| "Please Don't Fall in Love" | 1983 | Unknown |
| "Baby You're Dynamite" | 1984 | Unknown |
| "Ocean Deep" | 1984 | Unknown |
| "Shooting from the Heart" | 1984 | Unknown |
| "She's So Beautiful" | 1985 | Ken Russell |
| "It's in Every One of Us" | 1985 | Unknown |
| "Living Doll" (with the Young Ones) | 1986 | Unknown |
| "All I Ask of You" (with Sarah Brightman) | 1986 | Ken Russell |
| "Slow Rivers" | 1986 | Unknown |
| "My Pretty One" | 1987 | Dieter Trattmann |
| "Some People" | 1987 | Dieter Trattmann |
| "Remember Me" | 1987 | Dieter Trattmann |
| "Two Hearts" | 1988 | Dieter Trattmann |
| "Mistletoe and Wine" | 1988 | Dieter Trattmann |
| "The Best of Me" | 1989 | Terence Bulley |
| "I Just Don't Have the Heart" | 1989 | Terence Bulley |
| "Lean on You" | 1989 | Unknown |
| "Whenever God Shines His Light" (with Van Morrison) | 1989 | Peter Christopherson |
| "Stronger Than That" | 1990 | Gordon Elsbury |
| "From a Distance" | 1990 | Unknown |
| "Saviour's Day" | 1990 | Unknown |
| "We Should Be Together" | 1991 | Unknown |
| "This New Year" | 1991 | Paul Cox |
| "I Still Believe in You" | 1992 | Paul Cox |
| "Peace in Our Time" | 1993 | Neil MacKenzie Matthews |
| "Human Work of Art" | 1993 | Dieter Trattmann |
| "Healing Love" | 1993 | Dieter Trattmann |
| "Misunderstood Man" | 1995 | Unknown |
| "Had to Be" (with Olivia Newton-John) | 1995 | Nick Morris |
| "I Do Not Love You Isabella" | 1996 | Nick Morris |
| "Can't Keep This Feeling In" | 1998 | Gregg Masuak |
| "Butterfly Kisses" | 1998 | Gregg Masuak |
| "Vita Mia" (with Vincenzo La Scola) | 1998 | Unknown |
| "The Millennium Prayer" | 1999 | Unknown |
| "Somewhere Over the Rainbow"/"What a Wonderful World" | 2001 | Unknown |
| "Santa's List" | 2003 | Unknown |
| "Somethin' Is Goin' On" | 2004 | Unknown |
| "Danny Boy" (with Helmut Lotti) | 2006 | Unknown |
| "21st Century Christmas" | 2006 | Unknown |
| "It's Gonna Be Okay" (with the Piano Guys) | 2017 | Unknown |
| "Rise Up" | 2018 | Unknown |
| "Reborn" | 2018 | Unknown |
| "It Is Well" (with Sheila Walsh) | 2020 | Unknown |
| "Sleigh Ride" | 2022 | Unknown |

== See also ==
- Cliff Richard singles discography
- Cliff Richard albums discography
