= Give a Little Bit More =

Give a Little Bit More may refer to:

- "Give a Little Bit More", a 1981 song by Cliff Richard, released in the US and Canada as the third single from his 1980 album I'm No Hero
- Give a Little Bit More, the title of the US and Canada release of Cliff Richard's 1983 studio album titled Silver outside North America
- "Never Say Die (Give a Little Bit More)", a 1983 song by Cliff Richard, released as the lead single from his 1983 album Silver (retitled Give a Little Bit More in the US and Canada)
