= Rise Up (Cliff Richard album) =

2018 studio album by Cliff Richard

Studio album by Cliff Richard
- Released: 23 November 2018
- Studio: Criteria Studios, Florida; Abbey Road Studios, London
- Genre: Pop
- Length: 58:32
- Label: Vox Rock; Warner Music
- Producer: Rupert Christie; Jochem van der Saag; Jorge Vivo; James Morgan; Juliette Pochin

Cliff Richard chronology
Stronger Thru the Years (2017)	Rise Up (2018)	Music... The Air That I Breathe (2020)

Singles from Rise Up
- 1. "Rise Up" Released: 29 August 2018; 2. "Reborn" Released: 18 October 2018; 3. "Everything That I Am" / "The Miracle of Love" Released: December 2018

Rise Up is the 44th studio album by the British pop singer Cliff Richard, released on 23 November 2018 by Vox Rock and Warner Music.

It was promoted as Richard's first album of new material in 14 years following 2004's Something's Goin' On, as most of his albums since then were compilations, covers projects, or a combination of the two (with the possible exception of his 2011 album Soulicious, which contains primarily new material, with 11 original songs out of 15).

The album followed Richard's legal battle with the BBC, and he said of the album's title, "I chose 'Rise Up' as the title track because after the bad period I went through in my life, I've managed to rise up out of what seemed like a quagmire". Richard also said he hoped the album would attract a new audience: "I could be recognised by some of these younger people to be a valuable artist. I'm not messing around with it, it's for real". The album reached number four on the UK Albums Chart and was certified Gold.

Three singles were released from the album. The title track, written by Terry Britten (who wrote Richard's hits "Devil Woman" and "Carrie") was released as the first lead single. "Reborn" was the second lead single. It was co-written by Chris Eaton, who wrote Richard's 1990 Christmas number one, "Saviours Day". The third single was the double A-side "Everything That I Am" / "The Miracle of Love".

The album also includes Richard performing a duet with Olivia Newton-John on the track "Everybody's Someone", originally recorded by LeAnn Rimes and Brian McFadden.

== Track listing ==
All tracks produced by Rupert Christie; additional production by Jochem van der Saag and Jorge Vivo, except "The Minute You're Gone", "Miss You Nights", "Devil Woman" and "Some People" produced by James Morgan and Juliette Pochin and feature the Royal Philharmonic Orchestra.

No.	Title	Writer(s)	Length
1.	"Rise Up"	Terry Britten; Graham Lyle	3:26
2.	"Reborn"	Steve Mandile; Christopher Neville Eaton	3:58
3.	"Everybody's Someone" (duet with Olivia Newton-John)	Martin Sutton; Chris Neil	3:45
4.	"Gonna Be Alright"	Ben Robbins; Steve Balsamo; Peter Wright	3:26
5.	"Stardust"	Anna Krantz	4:55
6.	"Dancing into Nightfall"	Jamie Hartman; Shridhar Solanki	2:49
7.	"River Flow"	Henk Pool; Micky Skeel Hansen; Joona Pietikainen	2:59
8.	"Wide Deep and High"	Eaton	3:23
9.	"There's One"	Sharon Vaughn; Carl Falk; Don Mescall	4:00
10.	"That's What the Night Is For"	Phil Thornalley; Jon Green	3:57
11.	"Everything That I Am"	Tom Nichols; Sigurd Rösnes; Martin Sjølie	3:21
12.	"The Miracle of Love"	Eaton; Alexander James Brown	4:08
13.	"The Minute You're Gone" (with the Royal Philharmonic Orchestra)	Jimmy Gateley	2:35
14.	"Miss You Nights" (with the Royal Philharmonic Orchestra)	Dave Townsend	3:59
15.	"Devil Woman" (with the Royal Philharmonic Orchestra)	Britten; Christine Holmes	3:51
16.	"Some People" (with the Royal Philharmonic Orchestra)	Alan Tarney	4:00

== Charts and certifications ==
=== Weekly charts ===
Chart (2018)	Peak position
Australian Digital Albums (ARIA)	30
Belgian Albums (Ultratop Flanders)	77
Dutch Albums (Album Top 100)	62
Irish Albums (IRMA)	94
Scottish Albums (OCC)	7
UK Albums (OCC)	4

=== Year-end charts ===
Chart (2018)	Position
UK Albums (OCC)	54

=== Certifications ===
Region	Certification	Certified units/sales
United Kingdom (BPI)	Gold	100,000^{‡}
^{‡} Sales+streaming figures based on certification alone.
