= Dream (Cliff Richard and the Shadows EP) =

1961 EP by Cliff Richard and the Shadows

EP by Cliff Richard and the Shadows
- Released: November 1961
- Recorded: 4 & 12 May 1961
- Studios: EMI Studios, London
- Genre: Pop
- Length: 10:54
- Label: Columbia
- Producer: Norrie Paramor

Cliff Richard and the Shadows chronology
Listen to Cliff (No. 1) (1961)	Dream (1961)	Listen to Cliff (No. 2) (1961)

Dream is an EP by Cliff Richard and the Shadows, released in November 1961. It peaked at number 3 on both the Record Retailer and Melody Maker EP charts.

== Release ==
On the back of the success of "Theme for a Dream" (a top-three hit in March 1961), Richard decided to record several "dream" themed pop standards. Recorded in May at EMI Studios, these tracks were released as an EP, appropriately named Dream, in November 1961. Writing in the liner notes, James Wynn described Richard as "[adding] new dimensions to these time-tested favourites, giving them a freshness and vitality that brings them bang up to date. Such fine standards thoroughly deserve a new lease of life – and Cliff is just the right person to provide it".

== Track listing ==
Side A
No.	Title	Writer(s)	Length
1.	"Dream"	Johnny Mercer	2:33
2.	"All I Do Is Dream of You"	Nacio Herb Brown; Arthur Freed	2:51

Side B
No.	Title	Writer(s)	Length
3.	"I'll See You in My Dreams"	Gus Kahn; Isham Jones	2:50
4.	"When I Grow Too Old to Dream"	Oscar Hammerstein II; Sigmund Romberg	2:40
Total length:			10:54

== Personnel ==
- Cliff Richard – vocals
- Hank Marvin – lead guitar
- Bruce Welch – rhythm guitar
- Jet Harris – bass guitar
- Tony Meehan – drums

== Charts ==
Chart (1961–62)	Peak position
UK Record Retailer Top 20	3
UK Melody Maker Top 10	3
