= Love... The Album =

2007 studio album by Cliff Richard

Studio album by Cliff Richard
- Released: 12 November 2007
- Recorded: 1963–2007
- Genre: Pop, easy listening
- Length: 57:50 (CD version), 56:45 (Digital download version)
- Label: EMI Records
- Producer: Michael Omartian; Norrie Paramor; Bruce Welch; Cliff Richard; Richard Hewson; Craig Pruess; Monroe Jones; Paul Moessl; Alan Tarney

Cliff Richard chronology
Two's Company The Duets (2006)	Love... The Album (2007)	And They Said It Wouldn't Last (My 50 Years In Music) (2008)

Singles from Love... The Album
- 1. "When I Need You" Released: 29 October 2007

Love... The Album is a hybrid compilation/studio album by British singer Cliff Richard, released by EMI on 12 November 2007 in the UK. The five new studio tracks were produced by Michael Omartian. It reached No. 13 in the UK Albums Chart.

There are two versions of this album, the CD version and the digital download version. The difference is on track 12, the CD version is "For Life" whilst the digital download version is "My Pretty One".

The five new recordings on the album are cover songs: "Waiting for a Girl Like You" (originally by Foreigner), "If You're Not The One" (originally by Daniel Bedingfield), "When I Need You" (originally recorded by Leo Sayer), "When You Say Nothing at All" (originally by Keith Whitley) and "All Out of Love" (originally by Air Supply). The album launched only one single, a cover of Leo Sayer's "When I Need You" which reached no. 38 in the UK Singles Chart.

== Background ==
On 30 October 2007, before releasing the CD version of Love... the Album, EMI and the Cliff Richard Organisation decided that for 2 weeks, if there is a high enough demand for the digital download version of the album (which was 400 copies), then the price will drop from £7.99 to £3.99. For each album being downloaded, the price of the album drops by 1 pence.

During the two-week period, Richard said:

As artists we face a stark choice. We either keep one step ahead of the technology which is changing our industry so radically - or we throw our hands and quit. Personally I'm not for quitting!

On 8 November 2007, it was announced that the £3.99 price tag for the album has been secured and that all people who have downloaded it during the two-week period would all pay £3.99 instead of the original price. All copies downloaded contributed to the first week of the UK Albums Chart.

== Track listing ==
CD version (EMI 5093702)
No.	Title	Writer(s)	Producer(s)	Length
1.	"Waiting for a Girl Like You"	Mick Jones; Lou Gramm	Michael Omartian	4:15
2.	"It's All in the Game"	Charles G. Dawes; Carl Sigman	Norrie Paramor	3:13
3.	"Miss You Nights"	Dave Townsend	Bruce Welch	3:56
4.	"If You're Not the One"	Daniel Bedingfield	Omartian	4:30
5.	"Constantly"	Saverio Seracini; Vincenzo D'Acquisto	Paramor	2:39
6.	"The Best of Me"	Jeremy Lubbock; David Foster; Richard Marx	Cliff Richard	4:11
7.	"When I Need You"	Carole Bayer Sager; Albert Hammond	Omartian	4:14
8.	"True Love Ways"	Norman Petty; Buddy Holly	Richard; Richard Hewson	3:18
9.	"The Twelfth of Never"	Jerry Livingston; Paul Francis Webster	Paramor	2:44
10.	"When You Say Nothing at All"	Paul Overstreet; Don Schlitz	Omartian	3:30
11.	"Ocean Deep"	Rod Trott; Jon Sweet	Craig Pruess; Richard	5:19
12.	"For Life"	Chris Eaton; Bobby Huff	Monroe Jones	5:01
13.	"All Out of Love"	Graham Russell; Clive Davis	Omartian	3:23
14.	"I Still Believe in You"	David Pomeranz; Dean Pitchford	Paul Moessl	3:45
15.	"Some People"	Alan Tarney	Tarney	3:52

=== Digital download version ===
#	Title	Time
1.	"Waiting for a Girl Like You"; Writers: Foreigner, L. Gramm, M. Jones; Producer: M. Omartian	4:15
2.	"It's All in the Game"; Writers: C. Dawes, G. Sigman; Producer: N. Paramor	3:13
3.	"Miss You Nights"; Writer: D. Townsend; Producer: B. Welch	3:56
4.	"If You're Not the One"; Writer: D. Bedingfield; Producer: M. Omartian	4:30
5.	"Constantly"; Writers: S. Seracini, V. D'Acquisto; Producer: N. Paramor	2:39
6.	"The Best of Me"; Writers: J. Lubbock, D. Foster, R. Marx; Producer: C. Richard	4:11
7.	"When I Need You"; Writers: C. Bayer Sager, A. Hammond; Producer: M. Omartian	4:14
8.	"True Love Ways"; Writers: N. Petty, B. Holly; Producers: C. Richard, R. Hewson	3:18
9.	"The Twelfth of Never"; Writers: J. Livingstone, F. Webster; Producer: N. Paramor	2:44
10.	"When You Say Nothing at All"; Writers: P. Overstreet, D. Schlitz; Producer: M. Omartian	3:30
11.	"Ocean Deep"; Writers: R. Trott, J.Sweet; Producers: C. Pruess	5:19
12.	"My Pretty One"; Writer: A. Tarney; Producer: A. Tarney	3:56
13.	"All Out of Love"; Writers: G. Russell, C. Davis; Producer: M. Omartian	3:23
14.	"I Still Believe in You"; Writers: D. Pomeranz, Pitchford; Producer: P. Moessl	3:45
15.	"Some People"; Writer: A. Tarney; Producer: A. Tarney	3:52

== Charts and certifications ==
=== Weekly charts ===
Chart (2007−08)	Peak position
New Zealand Albums (RMNZ)	28
UK Albums (OCC)	13

=== Year-end charts ===
Chart (2007)	Position
United Kingdom (OCC)	95

=== Certifications ===
Region	Certification	Certified units/sales
United Kingdom (BPI)	Gold	100,000^{^}
^{^} Shipments figures based on certification alone.
