= More Hits – by Cliff =

Compilation album by Cliff Richard
- Released: 1965
- Label: Columbia

Professional ratings
Review scores
Source	Rating
AllMusic	3/5 stars

More Hits – by Cliff is a compilation album by Cliff Richard released in 1965 on Columbia Records.

== Track listing ==
Side 1
No.	Title	Length
1.	"It'll Be Me"
2.	"The Next Time"
3.	"Bachelor Boy"
4.	"Summer Holiday"
5.	"Dancing Shoes"
6.	"Lucky Lips"
7.	"It's All in the Game"

Side 2
No.	Title	Length
1.	"Don't Talk to Him"
2.	"I'm the Lonely One"
3.	"Constantly"
4.	"On the Beach"
5.	"A Matter of Moments"
6.	"The Twelfth of Never"
7.	"I Could Easily Fall (in Love with You)"

== Charts ==
Chart (1965)	Peak position
UK Albums (Official Charts)	20
