= Baby You're Dynamite =

1984 single by Cliff Richard

Single by Cliff Richard

from the album Silver
- B-side: "Ocean Deep" (UK); "Back in Vaudeville" (Eur, Aus)
- Released: 19 March 1984 (7-inch); 23 April 1984 (12-inch)
- Recorded: August 1983
- Studio: Abbey Road
- Genre: Pop
- Length: 3:20 (7-inch edit); 5:08 (12-inch extended mix)
- Label: EMI Records
- Songwriter(s): Doug Flett, Guy Fletcher
- Producer(s): Bruce Welch

Cliff Richard singles chronology
"Please Don't Fall in Love" (1983)	"Baby You're Dynamite" (00000002)	"Ocean Deep" (1984)

Music video
- "Baby You're Dynamite" on YouTube

"Baby You're Dynamite" is a song performed by Cliff Richard and was released as a single in early 1984 in the UK. The song is written by Doug Flett and Guy Fletcher. It first appeared on Richard's 1983 album Silver and in the UK became the third single lifted from the album. During the single's 6-week run on UK Singles Chart, with "Ocean Deep" as the B-side, it peaked at number 27.

In some markets such as Germany, Australia and The Netherlands, the song was the second single lifted from the Silver album. This single was released in late 1983 and had a different B-side, "Back in Vaudeville", a non-album track.

== Reversal of A and B-sides ==
Shortly after the single's original release, fans lobbied the record company to release the B-side, "Ocean Deep" as the A-side. Several disc-jockeys also insisted on playing "Ocean Deep" instead of the A-side. This eventually mounted enough pressure on EMI Records to release "Ocean Deep" as the A-side. A new picture cover was created for the single, but the release simply reused the same catalogue number and relegated an extended mix of "Baby You're Dynamite" to the B-side.

"Ocean Deep" entered the chart at number 72 in May, three weeks after "Baby You're Dynamite" had left the chart, but climbed no further in its three remaining weeks in the top 100.

== Charts ==
"Baby You're Dynamite"/"Ocean Deep"

Chart (1984)	Peak position
UK Singles (OCC)	27
Ireland (IRMA)	16

"Baby You're Dynamite"/"Back in Vaudeville"

Chart (1983)	Peak position
Australia (Kent Music Report)	46
Belgium (Ultratop 50 Wallonia)	35

"Ocean Deep"/"Baby You're Dynamite" (extended mix)

Chart (1984)	Peak position
UK Singles (OCC)	72
