= Christmas with Cliff =

Studio album by Cliff Richard
- Released: 25 November 2022
- Recorded: 2022
- Studio: Criteria Studios, North Miami, Florida
- Label: East West
- Producer: Sam Hollander; Chris Walden; Josh Edmondson

Cliff Richard chronology
Music... The Air That I Breathe (2020)	Christmas with Cliff (2022)	Cliff with Strings – My Kinda Life (2023)

Singles from Christmas with Cliff
- 1. "Sleigh Ride" Released: 14 October 2022; 2. "Rockin' Around the Christmas Tree" Released: 28 October 2022; 3. "It's the Most Wonderful Time of the Year" Released: 11 November 2022; 4. "Heart of Christmas" Released: 24 November 2022

Christmas with Cliff is the 46th studio album by British pop singer Cliff Richard, released on 25 November 2022 by East West Records. The album entered the UK Albums Chart at number two, becoming Richard's 47th top 10 solo album.

Christmas with Cliff consists of 13 new recordings of Christmas music, including three newly written songs ("First Christmas", "Heart of Christmas", and "Six Days After Christmas (Happy New Year)"). It is Richard's third Christmas album following Together with Cliff Richard (1991) and Cliff at Christmas (2003), and his first made up entirely of new recordings.

== Commercial performance ==
The album debuted at number two on the UK Albums Chart, with first-week sales of 24,358 units. It is Richard's highest-charting album since the number-one album, The Album (1993). Christmas with Cliff is also his 47th top 10 solo album.

== Track listing ==
No.	Title	Writer(s)	Producer(s)	Length
1.	"It's the Most Wonderful Time of the Year"	Eddie Pola; George Wyle	Sam Hollander; Josh Edmondson^{[a]}	2:31
2.	"Sleigh Ride"	Leroy Anderson; Mitchell Parish	Hollander; Edmondson^{[a]}	2:43
3.	"First Christmas"	Simon Goodall; Alison Goodall	Chris Walden	3:43
4.	"Joy to the World"	Isaac Watts; George Frideric Handel	Walden	3:12
5.	"Jingle Bell Rock"	Joseph Beal; James Boothe	Hollander; Edmondson^{[a]}	2:19
6.	"Blue Christmas"	Billy Hayes; Jay Johnson	Hollander; Edmondson^{[a]}	2:26
7.	"When a Child is Born"	Zacar; Fred Jay	Walden	3:35
8.	"Mary, Did You Know?"	Mark Lowry; Buddy Greene	Walden	3:09
9.	"Heart of Christmas"	Jorge Mhondera; Jesse Reeves; Jonny Pike	Hollander; Edmondson^{[a]}	3:47
10.	"Go Tell It on the Mountain"	John Wesley Work Jr.	Walden	4:01
11.	"Oh Come, All Ye Faithful"	Traditional	Walden	3:16
12.	"Rockin' Around the Christmas Tree"	John Marks	Hollander; Edmondson^{[a]}	2:09
13.	"Six Days After Christmas (Happy New Year)"	Chris Eaton; AJ Brown	Walden	3:30

=== Notes ===
- ^a signifies a co-producer

== Charts ==
Chart performance for Christmas with Cliff
Chart (2022)	Peak position
Dutch Albums (Album Top 100)	61
Hungarian Albums (MAHASZ)	37
Irish Albums (OCC)	30
New Zealand Albums (RMNZ)	40
Scottish Albums (OCC)	1
UK Albums (OCC)	2

== Certifications ==
Certifications for Christmas with Cliff
Region	Certification	Certified units/sales
United Kingdom (BPI)	Silver	60,000^{‡}
^{‡} Sales+streaming figures based on certification alone.
