= Please Don't Fall in Love =

1983 song by Cliff Richard

Single by Cliff Richard

from the album Silver
- B-side: "Too Close to Heaven"
- Released: November 7, 1983
- Recorded: 21–23 March 1983
- Studio: AIR Studios, London
- Genre: Pop
- Length: 3:13
- Label: EMI
- Songwriter: Mike Batt
- Producer: Mike Batt

Cliff Richard singles chronology
"Never Say Die (Give a Little Bit More)" (1983)	"Please Don't Fall in Love" (1983)	"Baby You're Dynamite" (1984)

Music video
- "Please Don't Fall in Love" on YouTube

"Please Don't Fall in Love" is a song sung by Cliff Richard and released as a single in November 1983 in the UK. The song is written by Mike Batt. It was the second single released in the UK from Richard's 25th Anniversary studio album Silver. It reached number 7 in the UK Singles Chart and earned a Silver disc for sales over 250,000. Mike Batt said in a recent radio programme on Three Counties Radio that the song, alongside "A Winter's Tale (David Essex song)" and "I Feel Like Buddy Holly", was written about a relationship of his that wouldn't work for geographical reasons. However, he has now been married to that lady for 40 years.

In some markets such as Germany, Australia and The Netherlands, the song was the third single lifted from the Silver album.

== Chart performance ==
Chart (1983–84)	Peak position
Australia (Kent Music Report)	95
Ireland (IRMA)	5
UK Singles (OCC)	7
