= Ocean Deep =

1984 single by Cliff Richard

Single by Cliff Richard

from the album Silver
- B-side: "Baby You're Dynamite" (Extended Mix)
- Released: May 1984
- Recorded: May–June 1983
- Studio: Strawberry Studios South (Dorking)
- Genre: Soft rock
- Length: 5:19
- Label: EMI Records
- Songwriters: Rod Trott; Jon Sweet
- Producer: Craig Pruess

Cliff Richard singles chronology
"Baby You're Dynamite" (1984)	"Ocean Deep" (1984)	"Two to the Power of Love" (1984)

Music video
- "Ocean Deep" on YouTube

"Ocean Deep" is a sentimental ballad written by Rod Trott and Jon Sweet and originally released in 1983 by British singer Cliff Richard on his album Silver. It was later released as a single in 1984 in the UK and South East Asia.

The song's release in the UK as the fourth single from Richard's Silver album was belated after initially being consigned to the B-side of the album's third single "Baby You're Dynamite". Although pressure was mounted from fans and several disc-jockeys, it was only after "Baby You're Dynamite" had finished its chart run that the record company finally flipped the single, promoting "Ocean Deep" to the A-side. As the A-side, "Ocean Deep" only reached number 72 in a further 3 week run on the UK Singles Chart. Despite having little chart success, the song quickly became a phenomenon among Richard's fans the world over, with fans voting the song as their favourite, 25 times out of 26 in the annual "Cliff Poll" of fans' favourite songs between 1984 (when it first appeared) and the final poll in 2009.

The song broke through to the wider public in South East Asia, becoming very popular in the Philippines where it became one of the bigger hits of the 1980s and Richard's biggest hit in the region.

== Background ==
Richard discussed with an interviewer from a Philippine show how he came to record the song, "Ocean Deep was an unusual one because it came through the post from two writers who I didn't know; they were amateurs. When something comes in like that, privately, usually they're not very good. So I didn't listen to it for about three months. And then when I came home from a tour, I saw this tape and I said, 'Okay, I'll play it', and I exclaimed, Oh, it’s fantastic!' I love the song! I was so pleased that these two guys sent that to me. I'm very happy that "Ocean Deep" is very popular in Southeast Asia."

== Single release ==
"Ocean Deep" first appeared on a single as the B-side of the UK release of "Baby You're Dynamite" in March 1984 (the third single from Richard's album Silver). During the single's 6 week run on UK Singles Chart (peaking at no 27), both fans and several disc-jockeys (who played the B-side instead of the A-side) mounted enough pressure to eventually cause EMI Records to release "Ocean Deep" as the A-side. A new picture cover was created for the single, but the release simply reused the same catalogue number and relegated an extended mix of "Baby You're Dynamite" to the B-side. "Ocean Deep" entered the chart at number 72 in May, three weeks after "Baby You're Dynamite" had left the chart, but climbed no further in its three remaining weeks in the top 100.

In the United States and Canada, it was released in early 1984 as the B-side of "Donna" (originally by Ritchie Valens) on EMI America. Both songs were taken from the 1983 album Give a Little Bit More (the US version of the Silver).

== Other albums ==
The song has subsequently been included in many compilation albums, including:

- 1988: Private Collection: 1979–1988
- 2007: Love... The Album.

== Track listing ==
UK Original "Baby You're Dynamite" single release, March 1984

1. Side-A – "Baby You're Dynamite" – 3:51
2. Side-B – "Ocean Deep" – 5:19

UK "Ocean Deep" single release, May 1984

1. Side-A – "Ocean Deep" – 5:19
2. Side-B – "Baby You're Dynamite" (extended mix)

USA / Canada

1. Side-A – "Donna" – 4:19
2. Side-B – "Ocean Deep" - 5:19

== Covers ==
- Prudence Liew, a pop singer from Hong Kong released the song with the title "Love Has No Boundaries" as the lead single off her 1989 album Jokingly Saying. This version was a cover of Frances Yip's 1985 Cantonese version.
- Wakin Chau, a Hong Kong-born Taiwanese singer and actor also known as Zhōu Huájiàn, recorded the song for his 1993 English album Songs of Birds.
