= Music... The Air That I Breathe =

2020 studio album by Cliff Richard

Studio album by Cliff Richard
- Released: 30 October 2020
- Recorded: 2009–2020
- Studio: Village; Strange Cargo
- Label: East West; Warner Music
- Producer: Al van der Beek; The Bellamy Brothers; Rupert Christie; Albert Hammond; John Hartley; Larry Klein; David Mackay; Steven Sharp Nelson; Cliff Richard

Cliff Richard chronology
Rise Up (2018)	Music... The Air That I Breathe (2020)	Christmas with Cliff (2022)

Singles from Music... The Air That I Breathe
- 1. "Falling for You" Released: 29 September 2020; 2. "Older" Released: 15 October 2020; 3. "PS Please" Released: 29 October 2020

Music... The Air That I Breathe is the 45th studio album by British pop singer Cliff Richard, released on 30 October 2020. The album entered the UK Albums Chart at number 3, which has seen Richard become the first artist to make the top five of the albums chart for eight consecutive decades.

The album partly covers songs of The Beatles and Bee Gees, and the title track by The Hollies.

On radio, the album was BBC Radio 2's 'Album of the Week' in its first week of release, with the lead single "Falling for You" in rotation (and has been so for several weeks). The latest single "PS Please", featuring Mark Knopfler on lead guitar, has been added to the BBC Radio 2 new music playlist.

In other media, the album has been part of the conversation when Richard was interviewed on Piers Morgan's Life Stories (ITV, UK) on 25 October 2020, The One Show (BBC, UK) on 28 October 2020 and Sunrise (7, Australia) on 30 October 2020. Richard was also featured singing his new song "PS Please" on Songs of Praise (BBC) on 1 November 2020.

== Background ==
The album comprises seven newly recorded songs and five previously released duets that have not been included in a Richard album before. Of the seven newly recorded songs, two are brand new and five are covers. The brand new songs are "Falling for You" and "PS Please".

"Falling for You", written by Chris Eaton and Alexander Brown, was released on 29 September 2020 as the first lead single from the album. The second single, "Older", a cover of the Ben Platt song, was released on the 15 October 2020. A third single "PS Please", featuring Mark Knopfler" on lead guitar, contains a posthumous lyric of snippets of letters a father had written to his daughter, to open on her 17th and 23rd birthdays.

The duets included were recorded between 2009 and 2020 and feature artists including Albert Hammond, Sheila Walsh, the Bellamy Brothers, Bonnie Tyler, and the Piano Guys.

== Track listing ==
Taken from online sources and the physical sleeve cover:

No.	Title	Writer(s)	Producer(s)	Length
1.	"Falling for You"	Chris Eaton; Alexander James Brown	Larry Klein	3:13
2.	"The Air That I Breathe" (with Albert Hammond)	Albert Hammond; Mike Hazlewood	Albert Hammond	4:10
3.	"Here Comes the Sun"	George Harrison	Klein	3:02
4.	"It Is Well Inside My Soul" (with Sheila Walsh)	Horatio Spafford^{[a]}	John Hartley	3:55
5.	"Older"	Ben Platt; Michael Pollack; Nate Cyphert	Klein	3:45
6.	"PS Please" (featuring Mark Knopfler)	Matt Prime; Seye Adelekan; Tim Woodcock	Rupert Christie	3:36
7.	"Where or When"	Richard Rodgers; Lorenz Hart	Klein	3:31
8.	"I Could Be Persuaded" (with The Bellamy Brothers)	Bellamy Brothers; Don Schlitz	Bellamy Brothers; Cliff Richard	3:54
9.	"Too Much Heaven"	Robin Gibb; Barry Gibb; Maurice Gibb	Klein	5:13
10.	"Taking Control" (with Bonnie Tyler)	Steve Womack	David Mackay	3:36
11.	"Let It Be Me"	Gilbert Bécaud; Mann Curtis; Pierre Delanoë	Klein	3:18
12.	"(It's Gonna Be) Okay" (with the Piano Guys)	Andy Grammer; Dave Bassett	Steven Sharp Nelson; Al van der Beek	3:32

Notes:

- a Adapted by Ian Morgan Cron and Jess Clayton Cates

== Personnel ==
=== Production ===
All tracks produced by Larry Klein, except as follows:

- "The Air That I Breathe" produced by Albert Hammond
- "It Is Well Inside My Soul" produced by John Hartley
- "PS Please" produced by Rupert Christie
- "I Could Be Persuaded" produced by the Bellamy Brothers and Cliff Richard
- "Taking Control" produced by David Mackay
- "(It's Gonna Be) Okay" produced by Al van der Beek and Steven Sharp Nelson

== Charts and certifications ==
=== Weekly charts ===
Chart (2020)	Peak position
Australian Albums (ARIA)	59
Scottish Albums (OCC)	4
UK Albums (OCC)	3

=== Year-end charts ===
Chart (2020)	Position
UK Albums (OCC)	79

=== Certifications ===
Region	Certification	Certified units/sales
United Kingdom (BPI)	Silver	60,000^{‡}
^{‡} Sales+streaming figures based on certification alone.
