= Soulicious (Cliff Richard album) =

2011 studio album by Cliff Richard

Studio album by Cliff Richard
- Released: 10 October 2011
- Recorded: April & June 2011
- Genre: Pop, soul, R&B
- Label: EMI
- Producer: Lamont Dozier; Nickolas Ashford & Valerie Simpson; David Gest (exec.)

Cliff Richard chronology
| Bold as Brass (2010) | Soulicious (2011) | The Fabulous Rock 'n' Roll Songbook (2013) |

Soulicious is a 2011 studio album by Cliff Richard featuring duets with some of soul music's most respected names. Guest artists include Freda Payne, Dennis Edwards from the Temptations, Candi Staton, Percy Sledge, Roberta Flack, Deniece Williams, Brenda Holloway, Marilyn McCoo and Billy Davis Jr from the 5th Dimension, Russell Thompkins Jr from the Stylistics, Billy Paul and Peabo Bryson.

The album was produced by Motown songwriters and producers Lamont Dozier and husband and wife duo Nickolas Ashford and Valerie Simpson. It was recorded at several studios, in Memphis at both the Willie Mitchell's Royal Studios and Ardent Studios (with Lamont Dozier producing), and in New York at Above Asia Studios (with Nickolas Ashford and Valerie Simpson producing).

The album is Richard's first album of primarily new songs since 2004's Something's Goin' On album, and also includes four covers. The album reached number 10 on the UK Albums Chart and was certified silver in the UK.

== Track listing ==
| No. | Title | Writer(s) | Producer(s) | Length |
|---|---|---|---|---|
| 1. | "Saving a Life" (with Freda Payne) | Beau Dozier; Joshua Scott | Lamont Dozier | 4:08 |
| 2. | "Go On and Tell Him" (with Dennis Edwards & The Temptations Review) | B. Dozier | L. Dozier | 4:54 |
| 3. | "Do You Ever" (with Brenda Holloway) | B. Dozier | L. Dozier | 5:03 |
| 4. | "Teardrops" (with Candi Staton) | Cecil Womack; Linda Womack | L. Dozier | 4:27 |
| 5. | "When I Was Your Baby" (with Roberta Flack) | Nickolas Ashford & Valerie Simpson; Michael McDonald | Ashford & Simpson | 5:06 |
| 6. | "Are You Feeling Me" (with Deniece Williams) | L. Dozier; Jud Mahoney | L. Dozier | 4:21 |
| 7. | "Oh How Happy" (with Marilyn McCoo and Billy Davis Jr.) | Edwin Starr; L. Dozier | L. Dozier | 3:36 |
| 8. | "Every Piece of My Broken Heart" (with Valerie Simpson) | B. Dozier; James Burney | Ashford & Simpson | 3:55 |
| 9. | "How We Get Down" (with Russell Thompkins Jr & The New Stylistics) | B. Dozier; L. Dozier; Bruce Boniface | L. Dozier | 4:00 |
| 10. | "This Time with You" (with Candi Staton) | L. Dozier | L. Dozier | 3:56 |
| 11. | "Don't Say You Love Me (It'll Ruin My Day)" | Andre Henry | Ashford & Simpson | 3:14 |
| 12. | "She Looked Good" (with Dennis Edwards & the Temptations Review and Lamont Dozier) | L. Dozier | L. Dozier | 3:49 |
| 13. | "I'm Your Puppet" (Cliff Richard, Percy Sledge) | Dan Penn; Spooner Oldham | L. Dozier | 4:03 |
| 14. | "Always and Forever" (featuring Billy Paul) | Rod Temperton | L. Dozier | 4:59 |
| 15. | "Birds of a Feather" (with Peabo Bryson) | Nickolas Ashford & Valerie Simpson; McDonald | Ashford & Simpson | 3:55 |

== Charts ==
| Chart (2011−12) | Peak position |
|---|---|
| UK Albums (OCC) | 10 |
| Dutch Albums (Album Top 100) | 90 |
