= Two's Company (Cliff Richard album) =

2006 studio album by Cliff Richard

Two's Company The Duets

Studio album by Cliff Richard
- Released: 6 November 2006
- Length: 52:25
- Label: EMI Records

Cliff Richard chronology
The Platinum Collection (2005)	Two's Company The Duets (2006)	Love... The Album (2007)

Singles from Two's Company The Duets
- 1. "Yesterday Once More (with Daniel O'Donnell)" Released: 6 November 2006; 2. "Move It" Released: 11 December 2006

Two's Company: The Duets is a 2006 album by Cliff Richard. It is a part-compilation and part-studio album of duets. The guests include Elton John, Barry Gibb, Dionne Warwick, Olivia Newton-John, Lulu, Brian May and Hank Marvin.

In the UK, the album reached number 8 in the UK Albums Chart and was certified Gold. The album has sold over 320,000 copies worldwide. The album features a reworking of "Move It", with Brian May of Queen on guitar. When released as a double A-Side single with "21st Century Christmas", the song reached number 2 on the UK Singles Chart. A digital only single of "Yesterday Once More", a cover of the Carpenters song, was recorded with Daniel O'Donnell and released earlier in November. The album also features a posthumous duet featuring vocals of Matt Monro.

== Track listing ==
No.	Title	Producer(s)	Length
1.	"Move It" (with Brian May and Brian Bennett)	Brian May; Brian Bennett	4:07
2.	"Anyone Who Had a Heart" (with Dionne Warwick)	Chris Porter	3:30
3.	"Miss You Nights" (with G4)	Graham Stack, Matt Furmidge	3:56
4.	"Yesterday Once More" (with Daniel O'Donnell)	Porter	4:05
5.	"She Means Nothing to Me" (with Phil Everly)	Stuart Colman	3:36
6.	"All I Ask of You" (with Sarah Brightman)	Andrew Lloyd Webber	4:10
7.	"Let There Be Love" (with Matt Monro)	John Burgess	3:14
8.	"Throw Down a Line" (with Hank Marvin)	Norrie Paramor	2:49
9.	"Fields of Gold" (with Barry Gibb)	Porter	3:21
10.	"Up Where We Belong" (with Anne Murray)	Porter	4:29
11.	"Slow Rivers" (with Elton John)	Gus Dudgeon	3:11
12.	"Suddenly" (with Olivia Newton-John)	John Farrar	4:01
13.	"Danny Boy" (with Helmut Lotti)	Peter Koelewijn	3:56
14.	"Reunited" (with Lulu)	Porter; Rick Mitra	4:00

== Charts and certifications ==
=== Weekly charts ===
Chart (2006)	Peak position
UK Albums (OCC)	8
Danish Albums (Hitlisten)	16
New Zealand Albums (RMNZ)	9

=== Year-end charts ===
Chart (2006)	Position
United Kingdom (OCC)	86

=== Certifications ===
Region	Certification	Certified units/sales
United Kingdom (BPI)	Gold	100,000^{^}
^{^} Shipments figures based on certification alone.
