= Silver (Cliff Richard album) =

1983 studio album by Cliff Richard

Studio album by Cliff Richard
- Released: 3 October 1983
- Recorded: March–August 1983
- Studio: Strawberry Recording Studios South, Mayfair Studios, AIR Studios, Abbey Road Studios
- Genre: Pop, rock, rock and roll
- Label: EMI
- Producer: Craig Pruess; Terry Britten; Mike Batt; Bruce Welch

Cliff Richard chronology
Dressed for the Occasion (1983)	Silver (1983)	Walking in the Light (1984)

Singles from Silver
- 1. "Never Say Die (Give a Little Bit More)" Released: August 1983; 2. "Please Don't Fall in Love" Released: November 1983; 3. "Baby You're Dynamite" Released: March 1984; 4. "Ocean Deep" Released: May 1984

Alternative cover
- Cover for the remastered version

Alternative cover
- Cover of Rock 'n' Roll Silver

Silver is the 26th studio album by Cliff Richard. It was released in October 1983 to mark his 25th anniversary in music. The North American version was titled Give a Little Bit More and had a revised track list.

A limited edition 2-LP box set of Silver was also released in the UK. The second LP, entitled Rock 'n' Roll Silver contained 9 new recordings of rock and roll classics, including Richard's debut single "Move It", and one new song "Makin' History".

The album reached number 7 in the UK Albums Chart and earned Gold certification.

== Singles ==
The album spawned three UK hit singles. "Never Say Die (Give a Little Bit More)" was the lead single and reached number 15 in the UK Singles Chart. It was followed up by "Please Don't Fall in Love" which reached number 7. In early 1984 "Baby You're Dynamite" was released and reached number 27. However, while it was on the chart, fans pushed for the B-side, "Ocean Deep" to be released as an A-side and pressure mounted as disc-jockeys played the track too. But not until a fortnight after "Baby You're Dynamite" had finished its run on the chart was the single re-released with "Ocean Deep" as the A-side; it reached number 72 upon its re-entry to the chart.

Extended versions of "Never Say Die (Give a Little Bit More)" and "Baby You're Dynamite" were released as vinyl 12" singles, but have not been released on a digital format.

The album track "The Golden Days Are Over" was recorded by the pop group Bucks Fizz and released as a single in late 1984.

== Album releases ==
The original 1983 CD release of Silver only included 9 tracks from the Silver LP and 7 from the Rock 'n' Roll Silver LP, in order to fit on a single disc.

In 1992 it was re-released on CD (paired with The Rock Connection in a twin-pack) with the same track-listing, but was titled Rock 'n' Roll Silver. In 2002, Silver was remastered and re-released on CD, excluding the Rock 'n' Roll Silver tracks, but including the B-sides of the singles as two bonus tracks.

Rock 'n' Roll Silver has not yet been released on CD in its original form, but Richard's 1984 album The Rock Connection which originally contained 5 tracks from Rock 'n' Roll Silver, also included the remaining 5 tracks as bonus tracks when the remastered CD edition was released in 2004.

Professional ratings
Review scores
Source	Rating
AllMusic	link

== Track listing ==
=== Silver ===
Side one

1. "Silver's Home Tonight" (Craig Pruess, David Reilly) – 3:43
2. "Hold On" (Sue Shifrin, Terry Britten) – 3:18
3. "Never Say Die (Give a Little Bit More)" (Sue Shifrin, Terry Britten) – 3:42
4. "Front Page" (Aleksander John, Nick Battle)^{[A]} – 3:15
5. "Ocean Deep" (Jonathan Sweet, Rodney Trott) – 5:18

Side two

1. "Locked Inside Your Prison" (Robert Heatlie) – 3:29
2. "Please Don't Fall in Love" (Mike Batt) – 3:13
3. "Baby You're Dynamite" (Doug Flett, Guy Fletcher) – 3:57
4. "The Golden Days Are Over" (Sue Shifrin, Terry Britten) – 4:17
5. "Love Stealer" (Phil Wainman, Richard Myhill) – 3:38

CD Bonus tracks (2002)

1. "Too Close to Heaven" (Mike Batt) – 4:15 (from the B-side of "Please Don't Fall in Love" single, 1983)
2. "Lucille" (Al Collins, Richard Penniman) – 3:39 (from the B-side of "Never Say Die (Give a Little Bit More)" single, 1983)

=== Rock 'n' Roll Silver ===
Side one

1. "Makin' History"^{[A]} (Mark Griffiths, Graham Lyle) – 3:47
2. "Move It" (Ian Samwell) – 3:05
3. "Donna" (Ritchie Valens) – 4:23
4. "(Let Me Be Your) Teddy Bear"^{[A]} (Kal Mann, Bernie Lowe) – 3:06
5. "It'll Be Me" (Jack Clement) – 3:13

Side two

1. "Lucille" (Richard Penniman, Albert Collins) – 3:39
2. "Little Bitty Pretty One" (Robert Byrd) – 2:41
3. "Never Be Anyone Else But You" (Baker Knight) – 4:04
4. "Be Bop A Lula" (Gene Vincent, Bill "Sheriff Tex" Davis) – 3:17
5. "Tutti Frutti"^{[A]} (Penniman, Dorothy LaBostrie) – 2:24

=== Silver (1983 CD Release) ===
1. "Silver's Home Tonight" – 3:43
2. "Hold On" – 3:18
3. "Never Say Die (Give a Little Bit More)" – 3:42
4. "Locked Inside Your Prison" – 3:29
5. "Please Don't Fall in Love" – 3:13
6. "Baby You're Dynamite" – 3:57
7. "Love Stealer" – 3:38
8. "The Golden Days Are Over" – 4:17
9. "Ocean Deep" – 5:18
10. "Move It" – 3:05
11. "Donna" – 4:23
12. "Be Bop A Lula" – 3:17
13. "Lucille" – 3:39
14. "Little Bitty Pretty One" – 2:41
15. "Never Be Anyone Else But You" – 4:04
16. "It'll Be Me" – 3:13
Notes:
- A Excluded from the original 1983 CD release of Silver and the 1992 twin-pack CD release.

== Production ==
- "Never Say Die (Give a Little Bit More)" recorded at Mayfair Studios, London, May 1983. Produced by Terry Britten.
- "Please Don't Fall in Love" and "Too Close to Heaven" recorded at AIR Studios, March 1983. Produced by Mike Batt.
- "Baby You're Dynamite" recorded at Abbey Road Studios, August 1983. Produced by Bruce Welch.
- All other tracks recorded at Strawberry Studios South, May–June 1983.
- Other Silver tracks produced by Craig Pruess and Cliff Richard.
- Rock 'n' Roll Silver produced by Thunder.

== Give a Little Bit More ==
Give a Little Bit More

Studio album by Cliff Richard
- Released: October 1983
- Recorded: Strawberry Recording Studios South, Mayfair Studios, Air Studios, Abbey Road Studios
- Genre: Pop, Rock, Rock and Roll
- Label: EMI America
- Producer: Craig Pruess, Terry Britten, Mike Batt, Bruce Welch

Singles from Give a Little Bit More
- 1. "Never Say Die (Give a Little Bit More)" Released: October 1983; 2. "Donna" Released: February 1984

In the United States and Canada, the album was released by EMI America under the title Give a Little Bit More. It had a rearranged track list order and included a cover of the Ritchie Valens song "Donna" which replaced "Front Page". "Donna" was taken from the limited edition UK album Rock 'n' Roll Silver.

=== Track listing ===
Side One

1. "Never Say Die (Give a Little Bit More)"
2. "Hold On"
3. "Silver's Home Tonight"
4. "The Golden Days Are Over"
5. "Donna"

Side Two

1. "Locked Inside Your Prison"
2. "Please Don't Fall in Love"
3. "Baby You're Dynamite"
4. "Ocean Deep"
5. "Love Stealer"
