= Never Say Die (Give a Little Bit More) =

1983 song by Cliff Richard

Single by Cliff Richard

from the album Silver
- B-side: "Lucille"; "Front Page" (US, Can)
- Released: 22 August 1983 (7-inch)
- Recorded: 21–22 May 1983
- Studio: Mayfair Studios
- Genre: Pop
- Length: 3:42 (7-inch edit); 5:30 (12-inch extended mix)
- Label: EMI Records
- Songwriters: Terry Britten, Sue Shifrin
- Producer: Terry Britten

Cliff Richard singles chronology
"True Love Ways" (1983)	"Never Say Die (Give a Little Bit More)" (1983)	"Please Don't Fall in Love" (1983)

Music video
- "Never Say Die (Give a Little Bit More)" on YouTube

"Never Say Die (Give a Little Bit More)" is a song by Cliff Richard that was released in the UK in May 1983 as the lead single from Richard's 25th Anniversary 1983 album Silver. The song reached number 15 on the UK Singles Chart, and did better in Norway in reaching number 9 and in Sweden reaching number 13.

The song is written by Terry Britten and Sue Shifrin. Terry Britten is the songwriter who had written Richard's 1976 hit "Devil Woman" and 1980 hit "Carrie".

== Chart performance ==
Chart (1983)	Peak position
UK Singles (OCC)	15
Australia (Kent Music Report)	81
Belgium (Ultratop 50 Flanders)	21
Ireland (IRMA)	19
Luxembourg (Radio Luxembourg)	11
New Zealand (Recorded Music NZ)	35
Norway (VG-lista)	9
South Africa (Springbok Radio)	23
Sweden (Sverigetopplistan)	13
US Billboard Hot 100	73
US Billboard Adult Contemporary	23
US Cash Box Top 100	78
West Germany (GfK)	63
