= Something's Goin' On =

2004 studio album by Cliff Richard

Studio album by Cliff Richard
- Released: 25 October 2004 (UK)
- Recorded: 2004
- Genres: Pop, rock, Easy listening
- Length: 56:06
- Label: Decca
- Producers: Barry Gibb; Trey Bruce; Dann Huff; Monroe Jones; Steve Mandile; Michael Omartian; Tommy Sims

Cliff Richard chronology
Cliff at Christmas (2003)	Something's Goin' On (2004)	The Platinum Collection (2005)

Singles from Something's Goin' On
- 1. "Somethin' Is Goin' On" Released: 11 October 2004; 2. "I Cannot Give You My Love" Released: 13 December 2004; 3. "What Car" Released: 9 May 2005

Alternative cover
- German release on Edel Records label.

Professional ratings
Review scores
Source	Rating
hitl-reviews.de	6/8 stars
The Big Issue	5/5 stars
The Guardian	3/5 stars

'Something's Goin' On' is the 36th studio album by British singer Cliff Richard, released by Decca on 25 October 2004 in the UK. The album reached #7 in the UK Albums Chart and was certified "Gold" by the BPI.

This album was Richard's first with Decca and was recorded in Nashville, Franklin, and Miami in the United States. Reviews of the album were positive. Music Week rated this as "Album of the Week as it contained a well-rounded package."

Three singles were released from this album, the first being the title song Somethin' Is Goin' On, which reached #9 in the UK Singles Chart and stayed for 3 weeks.

The second single release is a song written by Barry Gibb from the Bee Gees called I Cannot Give You My Love, which reached #13 in the UK Singles Chart and stayed for 4 weeks. Barry Gibb also appears as a guest on the album as a guitarist and sings backing vocals in the track, his brother Maurice Gibb also featured as keyboardist on the album.

The final single release was What Car, which reached #12 in the UK Singles Chart and stayed for 3 weeks.

The album has sold over 150,000 copies worldwide.

== International release ==
The album was released as "For Life" on the Edel Records label in 2005 for the European market. It had a revised track-listing, including four of the five additional tracks released as B-sides on the singles. These four tracks were recorded during the same series of recording sessions for the rest of the album.

== Track listing ==
#	Title	Time
1.	"Thousand Miles to Go"; Writers: Steve Mandile, Dennis Matkosky, Brian White; Producers: Dann Huff, Steve Mandile	4:25
2.	"Somethin' is Goin' On"; Writers: Steve Mandile, David Mullen, Marcus Hummon; Producer: Tommy Sims	4:24
3.	"I Will Not Be a Mistake"; Writers: Gary Burr, Helen Darling, Will Robinson; Producers: Dann Huff, Steve Mandile	3:57
4.	"Simplicity"; Writers: Bob Farrell, Craig Wiseman, Dennis Matkosky; Producer: Tommy Sims	4:13
5.	"Sometimes Love"; Writers: Don Poythress, Brian White; Producer: Trey Bruce	3:07
6.	"I Cannot Give You My Love"; Writers; Barry Gibb, Ashley Gibb; Producer: Barry Gibb	5:03
7.	"The Day That I Stop Loving You"; Writers: Robert Huff, Darrell Brown, Jennifer Kimball; Producer: Michael Omartian	4:06
8.	"What Car?"; Writers: Trey Bruce, David Mullen, Gary Burr; Producer: Trey Bruce	3:31
9.	"How Did She Get Here?"; Writers: Steve Mandile, Gary Burr, Darrell Brown; Producer: Trey Bruce	4:13
10.	"Field of Love"; Writers: Will Robinson, Jennifer Kimball, Tommy Sims; Producer: Tommy Sims	5:06
11.	"For Life"; Writers: Chris Eaton, Bobby Huff guitar Duane Eddy. Producer: Monroe Jones	5:00
12.	"I Don't Wanna Lose You"; Writers: Chris Eaton, John Hartley; Producer: Trey Bruce	4:43
13.	"Faithful One"; Writers: Chris Eaton, Brian White; Producer: Tommy Sims, Michael Omartian	4:18

== B-Sides ==
#	Title	Time
1.	"How Many Sleeps"; Writers: Barry Gibb, David English; Producers: Barry Gibb	4:06
2.	"She's All Mine"; Writers: Chris Eaton, Ralph Van Mannenn; Producer: Trey Bruce	3:55
3.	"Slow Down"; Writers: Chris Eaton, Gary Burr, Darrell Brown; Producers: Michael Omartian	4:12
4.	"Diamonds On A Chain"; Writers: Don Poythress, Brian White; Producers: Monroe Jones	3:13
5.	"Sentimental Journey" (from Listen to Cliff!, 1961); Writers: Les Brown, Bud Green, Ben Homer; Producers: Norrie Paramor	2:07

== Personnel ==
- Cliff Richard - vocals
- Barry Gibb - vocals and guitar (on "I Cannot Give You My Love" only)
- Maurice Gibb - keyboards
- Hal Roland - keyboards
- Alan Kendall - guitar
- George Perry - bass
- Steve Rucker - drums
- Gustav Lescano - harmonica
- John Merchant - engineer

== Charts ==
Chart (2004)	Peak position
Danish Albums (Hitlisten)	23
Dutch Albums (Album Top 100)	67
Scottish Albums (Official Charts)	25
UK Albums (Official Charts)	7
