= 25 Years of Gold =

Greatest hits album by Cliff Richard
- Released: February 1983
- Recorded: 1958–1982
- Genre: Rock and roll, pop, rock
- Label: EMI
- Producer: Norrie Paramor, Dave Mackay, Bruce Welch, Alan Tarney, Craig Pruess, Cliff Richard, Richard Hewson

Cliff Richard chronology
| Now You See Me...Now You Don't (1982) | 25 Years of Gold (1983) | Dressed for the Occasion (1983) |

25 Years of Gold is a compilation album of hits by Cliff Richard, released in 1983 by EMI Records in Australia. The album spent three weeks at the top of the Australian album charts in 1983, 12 months after Richard's previous compilation Love Songs spent 2 weeks at number one on the same chart.

== Track listing ==
1. "Move It"
2. "Livin' Doll"
3. "Please Don't Tease"
4. "Do You Wanna Dance"
5. "The Young Ones"
6. "It'll Be Me"
7. "Bachelor Boy"
8. "Summer Holiday"
9. "Lucky Lips"
10. "On the Beach"
11. "In the Country"
12. "All My Love"
13. "Congratulations"
14. "Power to All Our Friends"
15. "Devil Woman"
16. "Dreaming"
17. "Wired for Sound"
18. "Daddy's Home"
19. "The Only Way Out"
20. "True Love Ways"

== Charts ==
=== Weekly Chart ===
| Year | Chart | Position |
|---|---|---|
| 1983 | Australian Kent Music Report Albums Chart | 1 |

=== Year-end chart ===
| Chart (1983) | Position |
|---|---|
| Australia (Kent Music Report) | 40 |
