= Walking in the Light =

1984 compilation album by Cliff Richard

Compilation album by Cliff Richard
- Released: August 1984
- Recorded: 1975–1982
- Genre: Gospel, CCM, pop
- Label: Myrrh
- Producer: Bruce Welch, Cliff Richard, Terry Britten, Alan Tarney, Richard Hewson

Cliff Richard chronology
Silver (1983)	Walking in the Light (1984)	The Rock Connection (1984)

Walking in the Light is a compilation album of gospel songs by Cliff Richard. It is particularly notable as being one of the best selling contemporary Christian music (CCM) albums during the 1980s in the UK.

The album's tracks were all originally released during Richard's renaissance period of the late 1970s and early 1980s on his studio albums, live albums, and the B-side of his pop singles. The track selection wraps up most of the Gospel tracks Richard released in the period that were not included on his two Gospel studio albums of the period, Small Corners (1978) and Now You See Me, Now You Don't (1982). A follow-up gospel compilation album It's a Small World was released the following year (1985), but it only contained two tracks not already available on earlier Richard albums; namely, "Tiny Planet" (previously unreleased) and "Moving In" (B-side of "Carrie", 1980).

== Track listing ==
As per the album liner notes and record centre-label:

Side 1
No.	Title	Writer(s)	Length
1.	"Better Than I Know Myself" (from Wired for Sound, 1981)	David Cooke / Judy Mackenzie	3:43
2.	"Such is the Mystery" (from I'm Nearly Famous, 1976)	John Dawson Read	5:10
3.	"Every Face Tells a Story" (from Every Face Tells a Story, 1977)	Michael Allison / Peter Sills	3:20
4.	"Love and a Helping Hand" (from the B-side of "Little Town", 1982)	Cliff Richard	3:06
5.	"You Got Me Wondering" (from Every Face Tells a Story, 1977)	Terry Britten	3:35
6.	"Walking in the Light" (from the B-side of "Hot Shot", 1979)	Terry Britten	3:15

Side 2
No.	Title	Writer(s)	Length
7.	"Why Should the Devil Have All the Good Music" (live; from Thank You Very Much, 1979)	Larry Norman	4:35
8.	"Under the Influence" (from the B-side of "The Only Way Out", 1982)	Garth Hewitt	2:49
9.	"Lost in a Lonely World" (from Wired for Sound, 1981)	Chris Eaton	4:03
10.	"You Me and Jesus" (from the B-side of "Little Town", 1982)	Cliff Richard	2:17
11.	"Summer Rain" (from Wired for Sound, 1981)	Chris Eaton	4:18
12.	"Thief in the Night" (live with the London Philharmonic Orchestra; from Dressed for the Occasion, 1983)	Paul Field	3:56
