= Dressed for the Occasion (Cliff Richard album) =

1983 live album by Cliff Richard

Live album by Cliff Richard
- Released: 9 May 1983
- Recorded: 23 November 1982
- Venue: Royal Albert Hall, London
- Genre: Pop
- Label: EMI
- Producer: Cliff Richard, Richard Hewson

Cliff Richard chronology
Now You See Me, Now You Don't (1982)	Dressed for the Occasion (1983)	Silver (1983)

Singles from Dressed for the Occasion
- 1. "True Love Ways" Released: 8 April 1983

Professional ratings
Review scores
Source	Rating
AllMusic	4/5 stars

Dressed for the Occasion is an album by English singer Cliff Richard, recorded live with the accompaniment of the London Philharmonic Orchestra at the Royal Albert Hall in November 1982. It was released in May 1983 on the EMI label and reached No. 7 in the UK Albums Chart and No. 30 in Australia. It was certified Silver in the UK.

"True Love Ways", a cover of the Buddy Holly original, was released in April 1983 as the lead single from the album and reached No. 8 on the UK Singles Chart. No further singles were released from the album, however the album includes covers of two additional hit songs, being "Softly, as I Leave You", of which the original English version by Matt Monro reached No. 10 in the UK Singles Chart in 1962; the other being "The Treasure of Love", of which Clyde McPhatter's original in 1956 reached No. 1 on the US Billboard Rhythm and Blues Chart and No. 22 on the Billboard Top 100, but only No. 27 in the UK Singles Chart.

The album also includes orchestral versions of several of Richard's hits since his 1976 renaissance, "Miss You Nights", "Devil Woman", "Green Light", "We Don't Talk Anymore" and "Carrie".

== Track listing ==
Side one

1. "Green Light" (Alan Tarney) – 4:11
2. "We Don't Talk Anymore" (Alan Tarney) – 4:34
3. "True Love Ways" (Buddy Holly, Norman Petty) – 3:11
4. "Softly, as I Leave You" (Giorgio Calabrese, Tony De Vita, Hal Shaper) – 3:28
5. "Carrie" (Terry Britten, B.A. Robertson) – 3:25
6. "Miss You Nights" (Dave Townsend) – 4:04

Side two

1. "Galadriel (Spirit of Starlight)" (Hank Marvin, John Farrar) – 5:36
2. "Maybe Someday" (Dean Klevatt, Karel Fialka) – 3:31
3. "Thief in the Night" (Paul Field) – 4:07
4. "Up in the World" (Clifford T. Ward) – 2:40
5. "The Treasure of Love" (Joe Shapiro, Lou Stallman) – 2:02
6. "Devil Woman" (Terry Britten, Christine Holmes) – 4:36

Additional (previously unreleased) live tracks from the concert (2004 re-issue):

1. "The Golden Days are Over" (Terry Britten, Sue Shifrin) – 4:04
2. "You, Me and Jesus" (Cliff Richard) – 2:06
3. "Discovering" (Chris Eaton) – 3:40
4. "Daddy's Home (James Sheppard, William H. Miller) – 2:40
5. "Little Town" (Chris Eaton) – 3:50

== Personnel ==
- Cliff Richard – lead and backing vocals
- London Philharmonic Orchestra conducted by Richard Hewson
- David Cooke – synthesizer
- Mark Griffiths – bass guitar
- Graham Jarvis – drums
- Steve Gray – piano
- Tony Rivers – backing vocals
- Tony Harding – backing vocals
- Stu Calver – backing vocals
- John Perry – backing vocals

=== Technical personnel ===
- Producers – Cliff Richard and Richard Hewson
- Conductor – Richard Hewson
- Arrangement – Richard Hewson
- Engineer – John Kurlander
- Mixing – Keith Bessey (at Strawberry Studios South)
- Recording – Doug Hopkins (using Pumacrest Mobile)

Credits adapted from the album's liner notes and the book Cliff Richard – The Complete Recording Sessions 1958–1990.

== Charts and certifications ==
=== Charts ===
Chart (1983)	Peak position
UK Albums (OCC)	7
Australian Albums (Australian Music Report)	30

=== Certifications ===
Region	Certification	Certified units/sales
United Kingdom (BPI)	Silver	60,000^{^}
^{^} Shipments figures based on certification alone.
