= Together with Cliff Richard =

1991 studio album by Cliff Richard

Studio album by Cliff Richard
- Released: 18 November 1991
- Studio: RG Jones, London
- Genre: Christmas
- Label: EMI
- Producer: Paul Moessl; Craig Pruess; Cliff Richard

Cliff Richard chronology
From a Distance: The Event (1990)	Together with Cliff Richard (1991)	The Album (1993)

Singles from Together with Cliff Richard
- 1. "Scarlet Ribbons" Released: 14 October 1991 (Europe, New Zealand only); 2. "We Should Be Together" Released: 25 November 1991; 3. "This New Year" Released: 30 December 1991

Professional ratings
Review scores
Source	Rating
AllMusic	2/5 stars

Together with Cliff Richard is a Christmas album by Cliff Richard, released in November 1991. The album features Richard singing popular traditional Christmas songs, his Christmas hits from recent years and two original songs.

The album reached number 10 in the UK Albums Chart and number two in New Zealand. The singles differed between regions. In the UK, "We Should Be Together" reached number 10 in the UK Singles Chart in the week of Christmas. It was followed by "This New Year", released just in time for the new year and made number 30. In Europe and New Zealand, Richard's cover of the 1950s standard "Scarlet Ribbons" was released as a single, reaching number 51 in Germany and number 19 in New Zealand.

A companion video of the album with the same title was also released at the same time, featuring all 12 tracks from the album plus Richard's 1960 Christmas hit "I Love You". Each song was filmed on a different set in front of an audience.

== Track listing ==
No.	Title	Writer(s)	Length
1.	"Have Yourself a Merry Little Christmas"	Ralph Blane; Hugh Martin	4:23
2.	"Venite (O Come All Ye Faithful)"	John Francis Wade	4:41
3.	"We Should Be Together"	Bruce Roberts	4:25
4.	"Mistletoe and Wine"	Jeremy Paul; Leslie Stewart; Keith Strachan	4:05
5.	"Christmas Never Comes"	Paul Field	3:59
6.	"Christmas Alphabet"	Buddy Kaye; Jules Loman	3:58
7.	"Saviour's Day"	Chris Eaton	4:54
8.	"The Christmas Song (Merry Christmas to You)"	Mel Tormé; Robert Wells	4:19
9.	"Little Town" (not on vinyl)	Eaton; traditional	4:12
10.	"Scarlet Ribbons"	Evelyn Danzig; Jack Segal	3:47
11.	"Silent Night"	Franz Grüber; Joseph Mohr; traditional	5:47
12.	"White Christmas"	Irving Berlin	3:13
13.	"This New Year"	Eaton	5:15

== Personnel ==
Adapted from AllMusic.

- Keith Bessey – engineer
- Dave Bishop – brass, alto sax, soprano sax, tenor sax
- John Clark – guitar
- Mickey Clark – background vocals
- Paul Dunne – guitar
- Andrew Greasly – assistant, strings, violin
- Mark Griffiths – bass
- Graham Jarvis – drums, percussion
- Gerry Kitchingham – engineer, remixing
- Peter May – drums, percussion
- Mae McKenna – vocals
- Paul Moessl – arranger, conductor, drum programming, keyboards, producer
- Sonia Jones Morgan – vocals
- Mick Mullins – vocals
- Peter Howarth – vocals
- Keith Murrell – vocals
- Tessa Niles – vocals, background vocals
- Nigel Perrin – vocals, voices
- Craig Pruess – arranger, keyboards, producer, programming
- James Rainbird – choir/chorus
- Cliff Richard – primary artist, producer, vocal arrangement, vocals, background vocals
- Frank Ricotti – drums, percussion
- Tony Rivers & The Castaways – arranger, vocal arrangement, vocals, background vocals
- Ben Robbins – engineer, remixing
- Miriam Stockley – vocals
- Steve Stroud – bass
- Anthony "Packrat" Thompson – vocals, background vocals
- Derek Watkins – brass, cornet
- Recorded and mixed at RG Jones, London

== Charts and certifications ==
=== Weekly charts ===
Chart (1991)	Peak position
New Zealand Albums (RMNZ)	2
UK Albums (OCC)	10

=== Year-end charts ===
Chart (1991)	Position
United Kingdom (OCC)	39

=== Certifications ===
Region	Certification	Certified units/sales
New Zealand (RMNZ)	2× Platinum	30,000^{^}
United Kingdom (BPI)	Platinum	300,000^{^}
^{^} Shipments figures based on certification alone.

=== Postponed Australian release ===
Curiously, the release of Together with Cliff Richard was postponed in Australia until the 1992 Christmas season, despite Richard touring Australia late in 1991 (with his From a Distance tour) and including numerous songs from the Christmas album in the repertoire. EMI Australia instead allowed the previous year's From a Distance: The Event album to receive attention (as it had not yet charted) and released a new five-CD box set, The Cliff Richard Collection, made up of previously released material. Both sets did finally chart briefly at the end of the tour, reaching number 21 and number 25 respectively. When Together with Cliff Richard was eventually released in late 1992, momentum from the tour had since passed and the album did not chart.
