= Wally Roker =

American singer (1937–2015)

Christian Waldemar "Wally" Roker (April 14, 1937 – December 2, 2015) was an American vocal group singer, best known as a member of The Heartbeats and sometimes called "The Godfather of Doo-Wop". He helped establish Scepter Records, worked in promotion and management for several other record labels, and helped set up the Doo-Wop Hall of Fame.

== Life and work ==
He was the son of Danish-born Frederik Waldemar Frederiksen, and Edna Hennemann, born in the Virgin Islands, who took the name Roker from a later marriage. Wally Roker was brought up by his mother and stepfather in New York City. He started singing in a vocal group, the Hearts, with Vernon Sievers, Albert Crump and Robbie Tatum, in Jamaica, Queens, in 1953. With Roker handling bass vocals, they added lead singer James Sheppard (later of Shep and the Limelites), and changed their name to the Heartbeats when they found out there was another group of the same name. The group first recorded in 1955, and had their biggest hit, "A Thousand Miles Away", the following year. The Heartbeats released a succession of singles through the late 1950s on various labels, including Hull, Rama, Gee and Roulette, before splitting up in 1960.

Roker had been in charge of much of the group's business arrangements. After they split up, Roker worked in A&R for Florence Greenberg of Scepter Records, and introduced her to songwriter Luther Dixon, who went on to write several hits for the Shirelles on Scepter. In 1965 he moved to Chicago, and in 1970 to Los Angeles, where he worked for several record labels including ABC. He worked in various capacities as record executive, producer, publisher, and manager, for the band Tower of Power among others. He also set up the Roker Record Group, with several labels within it. He helped establish the Doo-Wop Music Hall of Fame in Los Angeles, and became its Director of Music Marketing. He also appeared in reunion concerts with other members of the Heartbeats.

He died at the age of 78, following brain surgery.
