= Moondreams (Norman Petty song) =

1957 song by The Norman Petty Trio

Single by Norman Petty Trio
- B-side: "Toy Boy"
- Released: 1957
- Recorded: July 20 and 22, 1957
- Studio: Norman Petty Recording Studios (Clovis, New Mexico)
- Label: Columbia
- Songwriter: Norman Petty

"Moondreams" is a song written by Norman Petty and released in 1957 by The Norman Petty Trio. Featured musicians are Petty on organ, Buddy Holly on guitar, Vi Petty on piano, Mike Mitchell on percussion and the Picks on backing vocals.

"Moondreams" was one of the four songs recorded by Buddy Holly in a session on October 21, 1958 at Decca's recording studio in the Pythian Temple in New York City with the Dick Jacobs orchestra, the other tracks being "True Love Ways", "Raining in My Heart", and "It Doesn't Matter Anymore".

Holly's version of "Moondreams" was released on The Buddy Holly Story, Vol. 2 and as the B-side to "True Love Ways" (May 20, 1960) in the UK.

"Moondreams"

Single by Denny Laine
- B-side: "Heartbeat"
- Released: 1977
- Length: 2:41
- Label: Capitol/EMI
- Songwriter: Norman Petty
- Producer: Paul McCartney

Denny Laine released the song as a single in 1977. Record World called Laine's version "a light, lilting ballad that, like many a Holly classic, was never a hit for him" but that "Laine's version should set things straight."
