= Never Say No to Panda =

2010 Egyptian television advert series

- The panda confronts a father and son at a supermarket
- Agency: Advantage Marketing
- Client: Arab Dairy
- Language: Egyptian Arabic
- Running time: 0:33
- Product: Panda Cheese
- Release date: 2010
- Music by: "True Love Ways" — Buddy Holly & The Picks
- Production company: The House
- Country: Egypt

Never Say No to Panda (Egyptian Arabic: باندا مايتقاللهاش لأ [ˈbændæ mæjetʔæl.læˈhæːʃ læʔ], "You don't say no to Panda") is a series of television commercials produced in Egypt by Advantage Marketing for Arab Dairy, manufacturers of Panda Cheese. The commercials, which feature a giant panda who terrorizes people for not wanting to try the cheese, became a viral Internet hit. The ads were created by the Elephant Cairo agency and written by Ali Ali and Maged Nassar.

== Premise ==
In each commercial, a person is offered Panda cheese, and declines; this causes a giant panda to suddenly appear in front of them while the Buddy Holly & The Picks song "True Love Ways" plays in the background. The panda stares at the person for a few seconds before going into a silent but violent outburst, destroying objects around them, such as wrecking an office computer, pushing a television onto the floor, unplugging a hospital patient's IV, or pouring marinara sauce over an unprepared pizza.

One commercial shows a mother asking her husband if he got Panda cheese for the kids, but he said he didn't because they already had lots of food for the party. At that moment, the panda appears, slowly clapping and staring for a few seconds while the song starts to play in the background, before taking the birthday cake and throwing it at the wall. The slogan “Kids not exempted!” as well as the Panda Cheese slogan, “Never Say No To Panda” (in Egyptian Arabic), show up.

In a second variant of the commercial, a father is playing catch with his son at the park. When his son throws the ball again, it lands in the panda's hands, much to the father's wife and daughter's shock. The panda then proceeds to squish the ball with its bare hands, while the lyrics “Just you know why…Why…”, play and then stop for a brief moment. The song then resumes, while the panda grabs a spanner from the car and damages the windshield with it. Again, the two slogans show up (with “Never Say No To Panda” being displayed in English this time).

Two similar commercials also appear. In the first commercial, a father and son are at the grocery store. The son suggests they buy Panda cheese, but the father says their shopping cart is full. The panda appears and stares at the father before tipping over the shopping cart and stomping on the spilled merchandise. In the second commercial, the father and son return to the store, and the father is intimidated by the panda enough to buy two packages of Panda cheese before everyone walks away peacefully.

== Awards ==
In 2010, the commercials won two grand prix at the Dubai Lynx International Advertising Festival in May, a Silver Film Lion at the Cannes International Advertising Festival in June, and a Gold for Film at the Epica Awards.
