= Allison Danzig =

American sportswriter (1898–1987)

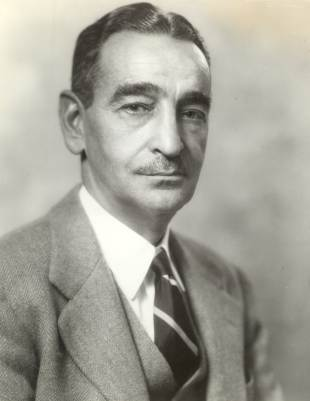
- Allison Danzig
- Born: February 27, 1898; Waco, Texas, U.S.
- Died: January 27, 1987 (aged 88); Bergen County, New Jersey, U.S.
- Education: Cornell University
- Occupation: Sportswriter

Allison "Al" Danzig (February 27, 1898 – January 27, 1987) was an American sportswriter who specialized in writing about tennis, but also covered college football, squash, many Olympic Games, and rowing. Danzig was the only American sportswriter to extensively cover real tennis, the precursor to modern lawn tennis.

Danzig covered every tournament in the Grand Slam, the U.S. Open, the Australian Open, Wimbledon, and the French Open, as well as many others. In 1968, Danzig was inducted into the International Tennis Hall of Fame in Newport, Rhode Island, becoming the first journalist in the Hall. In an interview shortly before his death, he named Bill Tilden as the greatest player he had covered.

== Early life and education ==
Danzig was born on February 27, 1898 in Waco, Texas, and grew up in Albany, New York. His sister, Evelyn Danzig, wrote the music for the hit song "Scarlet Ribbons" in 1949.

He attended Cornell University, where he was co-editor of The Cornell Daily Sun with E.B. White. Danzig also briefly played football for the Cornell Big Red while weighing just 125-pounds. He graduated from Cornell in 1921.

== Career ==
He joined The New York Times in 1923, after a stint at the Brooklyn Eagle, and remained there until his retirement in 1968. Before becoming a sportswriter, Danzig wrote obituaries, and was originally planning for a career as a foreign correspondent.

Danzig wrote several books, including: The Racquet Game (Macmillan 1930), a history of racquet sports; The Fireside Book of Tennis (Simon & Schuster 1972); and Oh, How They Played The Game (Macmillan 1971), about the early days of American football. A critic at The New York Times called his book History of American Football: Its Great Teams, Players and Coaches (1956) "without doubt, the most ambitious and best book ever published on the subject of college football." His last book, The Winning Gallery, was a collection of articles and essays about real tennis, published by the United States Court Tennis Association (USCTA).

He is credited with coining the term "ace" to describe a serve in which the opposing player fails to get their racket on the ball.

He lived most of his adult life in Roslyn Estates, New York, with his wife, two daughters, and one son.

== Death ==
Danzig retired to Bergen County, New Jersey, where he died on January 27, 1987, at age 88.
