= For the First Time Anywhere =

Compilation album by Buddy Holly
- Released: February 1983
- Recorded: 1955–1958
- Studio: Norman Petty Recording Studios (Clovis, New Mexico)
- Genres: Rock and roll; rockabilly
- Length: 20:56
- Label: MCA
- Producer: Norman Petty

Buddy Holly chronology
The Great Buddy Holly (1982)	For the First Time Anywhere (1983)	From the Original Master Tapes (1985)

Professional ratings
Review scores
Source	Rating
AllMusic	4.5/5 stars

For the First Time Anywhere is a compilation album by American rock and roll singer Buddy Holly. The album was released in February 1983 (see 1983 in music).

For the First Time Anywhere features the undubbed versions of songs previously released with overdubs by the Fireballs.

At the time of release this was considered an important release for Holly fans and awarded with a four star review from Rolling Stone.

== Track listing ==
Side A

1. "Rock-A-Bye Rock" - 2:23
2. "Maybe Baby" (1st Version) - 1:55
3. "Because I Love You" - 2:38
4. "I'm Gonna Set My Foot Down" - 2:16
5. "Changing All Those Changes" - 1:40

Side B

1. "That's My Desire" - 2:24
2. "Baby Won't You Come Out Tonight" - 1:56
3. "It's Not My Fault" - 1:19
4. "Brown-Eyed Handsome Man" - 2:03
5. "Bo Diddley" - 2:22
