= Dreamin' (Cliff Richard song) =

1980 single by Cliff Richard

Single by Cliff Richard

from the album I'm No Hero
- B-side: "Dynamite"
- Released: 8 August 1980
- Recorded: 12 May – 27 June 1980
- Studio: Riverside Studios, London
- Genre: Pop rock; glam rock
- Length: 3:38
- Label: EMI
- Songwriters: Alan Tarney; Leo Sayer
- Producer: Alan Tarney

Cliff Richard singles chronology
"Carrie" (1979)	"Dreamin'" (1980)	"Suddenly" (1980)

Music video
- "Dreamin'" on YouTube

"Dreamin'" ("Dreaming" in US) is a song recorded by Cliff Richard from his 1980 album, I'm No Hero. The track was the first of three singles released and was the biggest hit from the album, becoming a top-ten hit in numerous countries including the UK and the US where it became his third and last top ten hit.

== Release and reception ==
"Dreamin'" was composed by Alan Tarney with lyrics by Leo Sayer, whose own hit, a cover of "More Than I Can Say", was on the charts concurrently with "Dreaming" during the last four months of 1980. When recording the song, Richard was concerned that it was pitched too high for his range. However, Tarney told him "it was fantastic and asked [him] to try to sing it in this key".

It was released with the B-side being a re-recording of "Dynamite", a song Richard had originally recorded with the Shadows in 1959 and released as the B-side to their number-one hit "Travellin' Light". The re-recording was later included on Richard's 1984 album The Rock Connection due to a lack of material for that album.

Reviewing for Record Mirror, Robin Smith wrote "Golden toed and tonsilled Cliff takes a snort of Ginseng and mounts yet another winner. Smooth as a koala bear's bum in summer and with the same listenable capacity as 'We Don't Talk Anymore', The man who makes the EMI accounts department very happy, looks set for another decade".

The release of the follow-up single from Richard's I'm No Hero album, "A Little in Love" was delayed by the release of his duet with Olivia Newton-John "Suddenly", from the Xanadu soundtrack.

== Track listing ==
7": EMI / EMI 5095

1. "Dreamin'" – 3:38
2. "Dynamite" – 3:12

== Personnel ==
- Cliff Richard – vocals, backing vocals
- Alan Tarney – bass, backing vocals
- Michael Boddicker – synthesiser
- Nick Glennie-Smith – synthesiser
- Trevor Spencer – drums

== Charts and certifications ==
=== Weekly charts ===
Chart (1980–81)	Peak position
Australia (Kent Music Report)	4
Austria (Ö3 Austria Top 40)	3
Belgium (Ultratop 50 Flanders)	2
Canada Top Singles (RPM)	9
Canada Adult Contemporary (RPM)	10
Canada (CHUM Radio Networks)	7
Denmark (IFPI)	1
Finland (IFPI Finland)	9
Germany (GfK)	6
Ireland (IRMA)	9
Netherlands (Dutch Top 40)	12
Netherlands (Single Top 100)	15
New Zealand (Recorded Music NZ)	12
Portugal (Música & Som)	2
South Africa (Springbok Radio)	12
Switzerland (Schweizer Hitparade)	5
Sweden (Sverigetopplistan)	14
UK Singles (Official Charts)	8
US Billboard Hot 100	10
US Adult Contemporary (Billboard)	21
US Cash Box Top 100	9
Zimbabwe (ZIMA)	6

=== Year-end charts ===
Chart (1980)	Rank
Australia (Kent Music Report)	36
Belgium (Ultratop Flanders)	29
Canada Top Singles (RPM)	83
Denmark (IFPI)	13
UK Singles (OCC)	80
US (Joel Whitburn's Pop Annual)	74

=== Certifications ===
Region	Certification	Certified units/sales
United Kingdom (BPI)	Silver	250,000^{^}
^{^} Shipments figures based on certification alone.
