= Cliff at Christmas =

2003 studio album by Cliff Richard

Studio album by Cliff Richard
- Released: 17 November 2003
- Genre: Christmas
- Length: 71:03
- Label: EMI

Cliff Richard chronology
Wanted (2001)	Cliff at Christmas (2003)	Something's Goin' On (2004)

Singles from Cliff at Christmas
- 1. "Santa's List" Released: December 2003

Cliff at Christmas is the 2003 Christmas album of Cliff Richard, containing eight new songs and nine previously released songs including all of his previous hit Christmas-themed singles included. One new single was released from the album, entitled "Santa's List", which reached a peak position of #5 in the UK charts over the festive period. The album reached #9 in the UK Albums Chart and was certified platinum. In 2018, it was number 3 on the Official Top 20 biggest selling Christmas albums of the 21st century in the UK, having sold 409,000 copies.

The album marked a brief return to record label EMI with whom he had previously been signed for 41 years.

== Background ==
Cliff Richard was signed to EMI Records since his single "Move It", released in 1958. In 1999, he left the label due to a dispute over the release of "The Millennium Prayer", with the single subsequently being released on the Chrysalis Group owned Papillon Records label and becoming his first number one single in nine years. He returned to EMI in 2003 to release his single "Santa's List" and the album Cliff at Christmas.

Richard had previous success with singles at Christmas, and is closely associated with the season having had number ones over the period in 1999 with the aforementioned "The Millennium Prayer", in 1988 with "Mistletoe and Wine" and in 1990 with "Saviour's Day". It was with this album and the single "Santa's List" that he was aiming to achieve another Christmas number one record. However bookmakers Ladbrokes placed his chance this happening for the third time at fifty to one. "Santa's List" was written by Chris Eaton (the same songwriter who wrote "Saviour's Day") and Nick Trevisick.

== Promotion ==
To coincide with a number of other 2004 Christmas releases, including a number of "best of" albums, EMI re-released Cliff at Christmas in 2004 with a £150,000 advertising campaign. This promotion of the previous year's album was announced two weeks after Richard left the label to join Decca Records.

== Reception ==
In the UK Albums Chart, Cliff at Christmas entered the charts at number 38 on 29 November 2003. Over the course of the following three weeks it climbed the charts until it peaked at number 9 on 20 December. It dropped slightly during the Christmas week to number 14 and then exited the chart in January. When re-released in late 2004 it entered the chart at 66 on 11 December, before climbing to 60 the following week and then left the charts for the final time.

The 2003 release of the album went platinum in the UK charts, selling over 300,000 copies. It was Richard's first album to go platinum since the release of The Whole Story: His Greatest Hits in 2000.

== Track listing ==
No.	Title	Length
1.	"Have Yourself a Merry Little Christmas"	4:17
2.	"Mistletoe and Wine"	4:06
3.	"Walking in the Air"	4:20
4.	"Little Town"	4:08
5.	"Mary's Boy Child" (with Helmut Lotti)	3:39
6.	"Christmas is Quiet"	4:20
7.	"Let it Snow"	3:33
8.	"Saviour's Day"	4:54
9.	"White Christmas"	3:16
10.	"Silent Night"	5:29
11.	"Santa's List"	4:39
12.	"When a Child is Born"	3:36
13.	"Come to Us"	4:34
14.	"The Christmas Song"	4:12
15.	"We Should Be Together"	4:26
16.	"Winter Wonderland"	2:53
17.	"The Millennium Prayer"	4:41

Tracks 3, 5, 7, 11–14, and 16 are new recordings.

== Chart performance ==
=== Weekly album charts ===
Year	Album details	Peak chart positions					Certifications	Sales (based on certifications)
Year	Album details	UK	BE	DK	NZ	SE	Certifications	Sales (based on certifications)
2003	Cliff at Christmas	9	43	6	41	59	UK: Platinum	UK: 300,000

=== Year-end album charts ===
Chart (2003)	Position
United Kingdom (OCC)	50

=== Singles charts ===
Year	Single details	Peak chart positions		Certifications	Sales (based on certifications)
Year	Single details	UK	IR	Certifications	Sales (based on certifications)
2003	"Santa's List"	5	19		
