= This New Year =

1991 single by Cliff Richard

Single by Cliff Richard

from the album Together with Cliff Richard
- B-side: "Scarlet Ribbons"
- Released: 30 December 1991
- Recorded: July 1991
- Studio: RG Jones, London
- Genre: Christmas, Adult Contemporary
- Length: 4:20
- Label: EMI Records
- Songwriter(s): Chris Eaton
- Producer(s): Cliff Richard / Paul Moessl

Cliff Richard singles chronology
"We Should Be Together" (1991)	"This New Year" (1991)	"I Still Believe in You" (1992)

Music video
- "This New Year" on YouTube

"This New Year" is a new-year themed song by Cliff Richard, released as a single in the UK on 30 December 1991. It was the second single released from his first Christmas album, Together with Cliff Richard.

The song was written by Chris Eaton who had written Richard's 1990 Christmas single, "Saviour's Day", which had reached number one in the UK Singles Chart the previous year. "This New Year" reached number 30 early January 1992.

== Track listing ==
UK 7" Single (EMS218) and Cassette (TCEM218)

1. "This New Year"
2. "Scarlet Ribbons"

UK 12" Single (12EMP218)

1. "This New Year"
2. "Scarlet Ribbons" (12" remix)
3. "We Don't Talk Anymore" (1991 remix)

UK CD Single (CDEM218)

1. "This New Year"
2. "I Love You" (live acoustic version, from "Together with Cliff Richard" video album)
3. "Scarlet Ribbons" (12" remix)
4. "We Don't Talk Anymore" (1991 remix)

== Chart performance ==
Chart (1992)	Peak position
UK Singles (OCC)	30
