= Five sharps =

Five sharps may refer to:

- B major, a major musical key with five sharps
- G-sharp minor, a minor musical key with five sharps
- The Five Sharps, a short-lived music group
