= Now You See Me, Now You Don't (album) =

1982 studio album by Cliff Richard

Studio album by Cliff Richard
- Released: 30 August 1982
- Recorded: September 1981; January 1982; 25–26 March 1982 (orchestra)
- Studios: Abbey Road Studios; Strawberry Studios, Stockport
- Genres: Rock, gospel, CCM
- Label: EMI
- Producers: Cliff Richard, Craig Pruess

Cliff Richard chronology
Wired for Sound (1981)	Now You See Me, Now You Don't (1982)	Dressed for the Occasion (1983)

Singles from Now You See Me, Now You Don't
- 1. "The Only Way Out" Released: 2 July 1982; 2. "Where Do We Go from Here" Released: 10 September 1982; 3. "Little Town" Released: 15 November 1982

Now You See Me, Now You Don't is the 25th studio album by Cliff Richard, released in August 1982. The album is largely a mix of lightly veiled and more overtly gospel-message tracks, together with a few non-gospel tracks. It reached No. 4 in the UK Albums Chart, No. 1 in Denmark, No. 21 in Australia and No. 19 in New Zealand. It was certified Gold in the UK.

The lead single from the album, "The Only Way Out" was released in July 1982, reaching No. 10 in the UK Singles Chart. With this foundation, the album peaked at No. 4 on its debut in early September, matching the chart placing of Richard's previous two studio albums. Follow-up single "Where Do We Go from Here" was released in September but stalled at No. 60. In Germany, "It Has to Be You, It Has to Be Me" was released as a single, instead, and reached number 36 in a five-week chart run.

Late in November, "Little Town" was lifted from the album to become Richard's first Christmas song to be released as a single. It reached No. 11 in the UK in December.

== Background ==
Richard first went public about his Christian faith in June 1966. The following year he released Good News, his first album of traditional gospel songs. It mixed rock-tinged American gospel with traditional hymn performances. Richard followed it up with further gospel and Christian albums intermingled between releases of his mainstream pop albums, About that Man (primarily spoken-word, 1970), His Land (a film soundtrack, 1970), Help it Along (a live album, 1974) and Small Corners (his second studio gospel album, 1978).

Richard had also begun intermingling gospel tracks into some of his mainstream pop albums, starting with "Such is the Mystery" on his 1976 album I'm Nearly Famous and continuing on 1977's Every Face Tells a Story. From then on, more gospel songs that he considered to be musically high-calibre became available to him; he included three gospel songs on his 1981 album Wired for Sound. For his 1982 follow-up album (which became Now You See Me, Now You Don't), Richard planned a fully-fledged gospel album. He chose to produce it together with Craig Pruess. A quote from Pruess identifies two particular goals Richard had in mind for the album: "He wanted this album to be more heavyweight and wanted to break away from the pop sound. He approached it to prove a point. He didn't want his gospel albums to be regarded as inferior to his other albums. He felt they could be as good as anything else he did. He wanted to fuse his beliefs and his enthusiasm with his professional life."

The resultant album is not made up entirely of overtly gospel songs though, and has been described as a "gospel album in disguise" in the liner notes of the 2002 digitally remastered CD re-release. In reflection on the album, Richard himself said "I knew people would say the album is neither one thing nor the other. But it was very satisfying for me not to have to divide my musical tastes in two and produce an album simply offering music that I enjoyed."

The track "Thief in the Night" was originally recorded by Christian trio Nutshell on their 1979 album Believe It or Not. Richard also went on to record an orchestral version of the song with the London Philharmonic Orchestra for his 1983 live album Dressed for the Occasion and later included it on his 1985 CCM compilation album Walking in the Light.

== Critical reception ==
Professional ratings
Review scores
Source	Rating
Smash Hits	5/10

Billboard magazine in 1982 gave a positive albeit brief review of the album, saying "Richard has made some of the best pop singles of recent years, and several cuts here are worthy to join that list." It went on to describe the album as "[continuing] the pattern of his recent LPs, concentrating on sleek, buoyant pop tracks that bristle with excitement. There are also a few ballads for balance, including two traditional pieces - 'The Water is Wide' and 'Little Town,' where a new melody was put to the Christmas favourite 'Oh Little Town of Bethlehem'."

== Track listing ==
Side one

1. "The Only Way Out" (Ray Martinez) – 3:20
2. "First Date" (Aleksander John, Nicholas Battle) – 3:33
3. "Thief in the Night" (Paul Field) – 3:50
4. "Where Do We Go from Here" (Chris Eaton) – 2:53
5. "Son of Thunder" (Mart Jenner, John Perry) – 3:58
6. "Little Town" (Traditional; lyrics by Phillips Brooks, music by Chris Eaton) – 4:03

Side two

1. "It Has to Be You, It Has to Be Me" (David Cooke, Paul Field) – 4:17
2. "The Water Is Wide" (Traditional; arranged by Cliff Richard and Craig Pruess) – 3:50
3. "Now You See Me, Now You Don't" (Aleksander John, Stephen Turner) – 3:00
4. "Be in My Heart" (John Perry) – 4:38
5. "Discovering" (Chris Eaton) – 4:50

Bonus tracks (2002 re-issue)

1. "Under the Influence" (Garth Hewitt) – 2:49 (from the B-side of "The Only Way Out" single, 1982)
2. "Love and a Helping Hand" (Cliff Richard) – 3:06 (from the B-side of "Little Town" single, 1982)
3. "You, Me and Jesus" (Cliff Richard) – 2:17 (from the B-side of "Little Town" single, 1982)

== Personnel ==
As per the album liner notes:

- Cliff Richard – lead and backing vocals
- Mart Jenner, Paul Westwood, Bill Roberts – electric guitar
- John Clark – electric and acoustic guitars
- Mark Griffiths, Andy Pask – bass guitar
- Graham Todd – acoustic piano, electric piano
- Dave Cooke – Oberheim OB-X synthesizer
- Graham Jarvis – drum kit, cymbals, toms
- Craig Pruess – acoustic piano, synthesizers, electronic percussion, sequencers and autoharp
- Mel Collins – saxophone
- Paul Hart – electric violin
- Peter Skellern – acoustic piano
- Mo Foster – fretless bass
- Dave Mattacks – drum kit
- Backing vocals – Tony Rivers, Nigel Perrin
- Solo vocal on "Little Town" – Nigel Perrin
- The Mike Sammes Singers (on "Be In My Heart") – Mike Sammes, Enid Heard, Valerie Bain, Carole Allum, Angela Young, Michael Clarke, Danny Street and Tom Saffery

=== Orchestra on "Little Town" ===
- Conductor – Martyn Ford
- Arrangement – Craig Pruess
- Vocal arrangement – Tony Rivers
- Dave Arnold – tympani, chimes
- Trumpets – John Wilbraham, Crispian Steele-Perkins, Paul Cosh, Ted Hobart, Michael Laird, Gerry Ruddock, Mark Emney and Simon Ferguson
- French horns – Jeff Bryant, John Pigneevy, Chris Larkin, John Rooke, Robin Davies and Phillip Eastop
- Bass trombones – Geoff Perkins and Steve Saunders
- Tenor trombones – John Iveson, Dave Purser, Michael Hext, David Whitson, Paul Beer and Roger Brenner
- Double basses – Ian Anderson, Michael Brittain and Chris Laurence

== Production ==
- Recorded at EMI Abbey Road during September 1981 (Engineer John Walker assisted by Tony Richards). Strawberry Studios during January 1982 (Engineer John Walker assisted by Steve Cook). Strawberry Studios during March and April 1982 (Engineer Keith Bessey assisted by Steve Cook). EMI Abbey Road March 25 and 26 1982 for the orchestra (Engineer John Kurlander).
- Mixed at The Townhouse, April and May 1982 (Engineer Keith Bessey assisted by Howard Grey)
- Mastered by Gordon Vicary and Keith Bessey at The Townhouse.

== Charts and certifications ==
=== Charts ===
Chart (1982)	Peak position
UK Albums (Official Charts)	4
Australian Albums (Australian Music Report)	21
Denmark Albums (IFPI Denmark)	1
New Zealand Albums (RMNZ)	19

=== Certifications ===
Region	Certification	Certified units/sales
United Kingdom (BPI)	Gold	100,000^{^}
^{^} Shipments figures based on certification alone.
