= True Love Ways =

Single by Buddy Holly

Single by Buddy Holly

from the album The Buddy Holly Story, Vol. 2
- B-side: "That Makes It Tough (US); Moondreams (UK)"
- Released: June 29, 1960
- Recorded: October 21, 1958
- Studio: Decca (New York City)
- Genre: Pop
- Length: 2:47
- Label: Coral 9-62210
- Songwriters: Buddy Holly, Norman Petty

Buddy Holly singles chronology
"Peggy Sue Got Married" (1959)	"True Love Ways" (1960)	"Reminiscing" (1962)

"True Love Ways" is a song written by Buddy Holly and Norman Petty. Buddy Holly's original was recorded with the Dick Jacobs Orchestra in New York City in October 1958, four months before the singer's death. It was first released on the posthumous album The Buddy Holly Story, Vol. 2 (Coral 57326/757326), in March 1960. The song was first released as a single in Britain in May 1960, reaching number 25 on the UK Singles Chart. It was released the following month in the US, but did not make the charts. In 1988, a UK re-release of the recording by MCA, the single reached no. 65 on the UK singles chart in a five-week chart run.

In 1965, Peter and Gordon's version became a hit internationally, reaching number 2 in the UK, number 14 in the US Billboard Hot 100 and the top 10 in numerous other countries.

Other notable covers include Mickey Gilley's 1980 version which reached number 1 on the US Billboard Hot Country Singles chart and Cliff Richard's version that reached the top 10 in the UK and Ireland in 1983 and was a minor hit internationally.

== Buddy Holly original ==
=== Background and recording ===
The song was recorded at Holly's last recording session before his death on February 3, 1959. The session took place at Decca's recording studio in the Pythian Temple in New York City on October 21, 1958 and also included the recordings of "It Doesn't Matter Anymore", "Raining in My Heart", and "Moondreams".

In the extended version of the song, in the first ten seconds Holly can be heard preparing to sing. The audio starts with audio saying "Yeah, we're rolling." A piano player and a tenor saxophone player play some notes, and Holly mutters, "Okay," and clears his throat. The producer yells, "Quiet, boys!" to everyone else in the room, and at the end of the talkback, the producer says, "Pitch, Ernie", to signal the piano player to give Holly his starting note, a B-flat.

Holly biographer Bill Griggs points out that the melody borrows heavily from the gospel song "I'll Be All Right," a favorite of Holly's, and one that would be played at his funeral in 1959. According to Griggs, the framework of the melody was written by Buddy, with the remainder, and lyrics, added by Petty.

Holly's widow, Maria Elena Holly, claimed that the song was written for her as a wedding gift. On April 29, 2011, she unveiled the never-before-seen "True Love Ways" photo of their wedding kiss, now displayed at P.J. Clarke's above Table 53, the table where they became engaged while on their first date, on June 20, 1958.

A listing of producer Norman Petty's productions claims that Vi Petty, Norman's wife, recorded the first version of this song on June 4, 1958—two weeks prior to Buddy's engagement with Maria. However, only white label promotional copies were pressed (in July).

=== Personnel ===
- Al Caiola – guitar
- Sanford Block – bass
- Ernie Hayes – piano
- Doris Johnson – harp
- Abraham Richman – saxophone
- Clifford Leeman – drums
- Sylvan Shulman, Leo Kruczek, Leonard Posner, Irving Spice, Ray Free, Herbert Bourne, Julius Held and Paul Winter – violins
- Bill Linnane – keyboard
- David Schwartz, Howard Kay – violas

=== Releases ===
- UK: "True Love Ways" b/w "Moondreams" (Coral Q72397, 20 May 1960).
- USA: "True Love Ways" b/w "That Makes It Tough" (Coral C62210, June 29, 1960).

Two compilation albums by Buddy Holly have used the title of the song. The 1989 Telstar album reached no. 8 on the UK album chart. The 2018 Decca album with the Royal Philharmonic Orchestra reached no. 10 on the UK album chart.

=== Chart performance ===
Chart (1960)	Peak position
UK Singles (Official Charts)	25
Chart (1988)	Peak position
UK Singles (Official Charts)	65

== Peter and Gordon version ==
British pop duo, Peter and Gordon, released their version in 1965. It reached number 2 in the UK Singles Chart and is the only version of the song to have made the Top 40 of the US singles charts, reaching number 14 on the Billboard Hot 100 chart in June 1965 during the British Invasion era. Cash Box described it as "a pretty, lyrical emotion-packed reading of the Buddy Holly-penned oldie."

=== Chart performance ===
Chart (1965)	Peak position
Canada Top Singles (RPM)	3
Ireland (IRMA)	4
Netherlands (Single Top 100)	9
Norway (VG-lista)	10
UK Singles (Official Charts)	2
US Billboard Hot 100	14

Note, Canadian chart weeks following the song's climb up to number 3 on the Canadian chart are missing in the archive, so the song may have climbed higher.

== Mickey Gilley version ==
"True Love Ways"

Single by Mickey Gilley

from the album That's All That Matters to Me
- B-side: "More I Turn the Bottle Up"
- Released: March 28, 1980
- Genre: Country
- Length: 2:54
- Label: Epic
- Songwriters: Buddy Holly, Norman Petty
- Producer: Jim Ed Norman

Mickey Gilley singles chronology
"A Little Gettin' Used To" (1979)	"True Love Ways" (1980)	"Stand by Me" (1980)

Mickey Gilley, country singer, released a successful cover version in 1980 (during the height of his popularity). Gilley's version reached the No. 1 spot on the Billboard magazine Hot Country Singles chart in July 1980.

=== Chart performance ===
Chart (1980)	Peak position
US Hot Country Songs (Billboard)	1
US Billboard Hot 100	66
Canadian RPM Country Tracks	1

=== Year-end charts ===
Chart (1980)	Position
US Country Songs (Billboard)	7

== Cliff Richard version ==
"True Love Ways"

Single by Cliff Richard with the London Philharmonic Orchestra

from the album Dressed for the Occasion
- B-side: "Galadriel"
- Released: 8 April 1983
- Recorded: 23 November 1982
- Venue: Royal Albert Hall
- Genre: Pop
- Length: 3:10
- Label: EMI
- Songwriter: Buddy Holly
- Producers: Cliff Richard, Richard Hewson

Cliff Richard with the London Philharmonic Orchestra singles chronology
"She Means Nothing to Me" (1983)	"True Love Ways" (1983)	"Never Say Die (Give a Little Bit More)" (1983)

British pop singer Cliff Richard released his cover as the lead single from his Dressed for the Occasion album in April 1983. The recording is of a live performance at the Royal Albert Hall in 1982 with the London Philharmonic Orchestra. Richard's version reached No. 8 on the UK Singles Chart and was a hit in several other countries.

=== Chart performance ===
Chart (1983)	Peak position
Australia (Kent Music Report)	35
Belgium (Ultratop 50 Flanders)	24
Ireland (IRMA)	4
Netherlands (Single Top 100)	41
New Zealand (Recorded Music NZ)	45
UK Singles (Official Charts)	8

== Other notable versions ==
- Vi Petty, wife of co-writer Norman Petty, and pianist on many Petty productions, is believed to have recorded the first version in June 1958, with, initially, only limited promotional pressings made.
- Dick Rivers, a French singer, recorded a French adaptation, "Ne pleure pas" (1965). It reached number 19 in Belgium's Wallonia (French) charts and 43 in France.
- Randy Gurley recorded the song and it was a hit for her in 1978 on the Record World Country Singles Chart peaking peaked at no. 90 on the week of September 30. It also made it to no. 77 on the Billboard Country chart.
- David Essex and Catherine Zeta-Jones recorded a duet for Essex's 1994 album Back to Back. The single reached no. 38 on the UK singles chart.
- Ricky Nelson recorded the song in 1985, five days before his death in a plane crash. It was his last recording before his death, although the recording remains unreleased. However, an earlier recording from 1978 is widely available.

== Popular culture ==
- The Never Say No to Panda series of commercials for the product Panda Cheese, from the Egyptian company Arab Dairy, uses the Buddy Holly & The Picks version of the song as the theme tune of its unpredictable and destructive panda mascot. The commercials featuring the song became an instant hit on the internet and become an internet meme.

== Sources ==
- Bustard, Anne (2005). Buddy: The Story of Buddy Holly. Simon & Schuster. ISBN 978-1-4223-9302-4.
- Dawson, Jim; Leigh, Spencer (1996). Memories of Buddy Holly. Big Nickel Publications. ISBN 978-0-936433-20-2.
- Goldrosen, John; Beecher, John (1996). Remembering Buddy: The Definitive Biography. New York: Da Capo Press. ISBN 0-306-80715-7.
- Goldrosen, John (1975). Buddy Holly: His Life and Music. Popular Press. ISBN 0-85947-018-0
- Laing, Dave (1971–2010). Buddy Holly. Icons of Pop Music. Bloomington, IN: Indiana University Press. ISBN 0-253-22168-4. OCLC 611172616.
- Mann, Alan (1996). The A-Z of Buddy Holly. Aurum Press (2nd edition). ISBN 1-85410-433-0 or 978–1854104335.
- Norman, Phillip (1996) Rave On: The Biography of Buddy Holly. Simon & Schuster Publishing. ISBN 0684800829.
- Peer, Elizabeth and Ralph II (1972). Buddy Holly: A Biography in Words, Photographs and Music Australia: Peer International. ASIN B000W24DZO.
- Peters, Richard (1990). The Legend That Is Buddy Holly. Barnes & Noble Books. ISBN 0-285-63005-9 or 978–0285630055.
- Rabin, Stanton (2009). OH BOY! The Life and Music of Rock 'n' Roll Pioneer Buddy Holly. Van Winkle Publishing (Kindle). ASIN B0010QBLLG.
- Tobler, John (1979). The Buddy Holly Story. Beaufort Books.
