= Suddenly (Olivia Newton-John and Cliff Richard song) =

1980 single by Olivia Newton John and Cliff Richard

- Picture sleeve of UK vinyl single

Single by Olivia Newton-John and Cliff Richard

from the album Xanadu
- B-side: "You Made Me Love You"
- Released: 10 October 1980 (UK)
- Recorded: March 1980
- Studio: Los Angeles, US
- Genre: Pop
- Length: 4:02
- Label: MCA; Jet
- Songwriter: John Farrar
- Producer: John Farrar

Olivia Newton-John singles chronology
"Xanadu" (1980)	"Suddenly" (1980)	"Physical" (1981)

Cliff Richard singles chronology
"Dreamin'" (1980)	"Suddenly" (1980)	"A Little in Love" (1980)

Music video
- "Suddenly" on YouTube

Professional ratings
Review scores
Source	Rating
Billboard	(unrated)

"Suddenly" is a duet performed by Olivia Newton-John and Cliff Richard from the soundtrack Xanadu, and is the love theme from the 1980 film of the same name. It was written and produced by John Farrar.

"Suddenly" reached number 15 on the UK Singles Chart in October 1980 and number 20 on the US Billboard Hot 100 in January 1981. It finished the year as number 91 on the Billboard Year-End Hot 100 Singles of 1981. It was also a major Adult Contemporary hit, reaching number four. The music video shows Newton-John and Richard in a penthouse singing the song to each other, taken from her ABC TV special "Hollywood Nights" that aired before the 52nd Academy Awards on April 14, 1980.

The single's B-side, "You Made Me Love You" (Olivia solo), was also featured in the film Xanadu but does not appear on the soundtrack album.

== Personnel ==
- Olivia Newton-John – vocals
- Cliff Richard – vocals
- John Farrar – guitar and synthesizer
- David McDaniel – bass
- Ed Greene – drums
- Michael Boddicker – vocoder
- Jai Winding – electric piano
- Richard Hewson – orchestra conductor
- David J. Holman – mixing and engineering

== Track listing and formats ==
7-inch vinyl single

1. "Suddenly" – 4:03
2. "You Made Me Love You" (Olivia Newton-John) – 3:04

== Charts ==
=== Weekly charts ===
Chart (1980–81)	Peak position
Australia (Kent Music Report)	37
Canada Top Singles (RPM)	60
Canada Adult Contemporary (RPM)	14
Ireland (IRMA)	6
Israel (Israeli Singles Chart)	9
New Zealand (Recorded Music NZ)	30
UK Singles (Official Charts)	15
US Billboard Hot 100	20
US Adult Contemporary (Billboard)	4
US Cash Box	19
Luxembourg (Radio Luxembourg)	5
Quebec (ADISQ)	7

Year-end chart (1981)	Rank
US Top Pop Singles (Billboard)	91

Chart (2022)	Peak position
U.S. Digital Song Sales (Billboard)	42
