= She Means Nothing to Me =

1983 single by Phil Everly and Cliff Richard

Single by Phil Everly and Cliff Richard

from the album Phil Everly
- B-side: "A Man and a Woman"
- Released: 7 February 1983 (UK)
- Recorded: 5 October 1982
- Studio: Eden Studios, London
- Genre: Rock and roll, pop rock
- Length: 3:27
- Label: Capitol
- Songwriter(s): John David
- Producer(s): Stuart Coleman

Phil Everly singles chronology
| "Louise" (1982) | "She Means Nothing to Me" (1983) | "Sweet Pretender" (1983) |

Cliff Richard singles chronology
| "Little Town" (1982) | "She Means Nothing to Me" (1983) | "True Love Ways" (1983) |

"She Means Nothing to Me" is a song recorded by Phil Everly and British singer Cliff Richard, released as a single in 1983 as the second single from Phil Everly's eponymous album. The song reached number 9 in the UK Singles Chart. The song was written by Welsh musician and songwriter John David. Cliff Richard included a remixed version of the track with louder vocals on his 1984 album The Rock Connection.

== Personnel ==
As per the album liner notes and record centre-label:

- Phil Everly – lead vocals
- Cliff Richard – lead vocals, backing vocals
- Terry Williams – drums
- Mickey Gee – rhythm guitar, electric rhythm
- Mark Knopfler – rhythm guitar
- John David – lead guitar
- Pete Wingfield – electric piano
- Stuart Colman – bass, 6-string bass, reverse lead guitar, Korg, claps, fingerpops
- Rod Houison – percussion, engineer
- Neill King – engineer

== Chart performance ==
| Chart (1983) | Peak position |
|---|---|
| Australia (Kent Music Report) | 39 |
| Ireland (IRMA) | 7 |
| UK Singles (OCC) | 9 |
