= Lewis Redner =

American composer (1831-1908)

Lewis Henry Redner (December 15, 1831, Philadelphia, Pennsylvania – August 29, 1908, Hotel Marlborough, Atlantic City, New Jersey) was an American musician, best known as the composer of the popular Christmas carol "St. Louis", better known as "O Little Town of Bethlehem".

Redner worked in the real-estate business in Philadelphia, and played the organ at four different churches during his life. He held the title of Organist/Choirmaster at the Church of the Holy Trinity, Philadelphia 1861-1864 and 1869-1871 While there, he set Pastor Phillips Brooks's poem of his recollection of a pilgrimage to Bethlehem to music on Christmas Eve, 1868, and the carol was first sung the next day.

Redner was very involved with local charities. He served on the first board of Sunday Breakfast Rescue Mission, a homeless shelter and soup kitchen, in 1878.

Redner never married. He was buried at The Woodlands Cemetery in Philadelphia.
