= Dynamite (Cliff Richard and the Shadows song) =

1959 single by Cliff Richard and the Shadows

Single by Cliff Richard and the Shadows
- A-side: "Travellin' Light"
- Released: 2 October 1959
- Recorded: 6 September 1959
- Studio: EMI Studios, London
- Genre: Rock and roll
- Length: 1:54
- Label: Columbia
- Songwriter: Ian Samwell
- Producer: Norrie Paramor

Cliff Richard and the Shadows singles chronology
"Living Doll" (1959)	"Travellin' Light" / "Dynamite" (1959)	"A Voice in the Wilderness" (1960)

"Dynamite" is a song by Cliff Richard and the Shadows, first released in October 1959 as the B-side to the number one hit "Travellin' Light".

== Release and chart performance ==
"Dynamite" was written by former Drifters member Ian Samwell, who wrote several songs for Richard and the group. Due to the ways in which the New Musical Express chart (the canonical Official Singles Chart until 1960) was compiled at the time, the B-sides of some records gained enough popularity that they entered the chart, generally alongside the A-side. This happened to several of Richard's singles in the 1950s and 1960s, though the only other 'official' one was "Mean Streak" and "Never Mind" earlier in 1959.

On the New Musical Express chart, "Travellin' Light" spent five weeks at number one and "Dynamite" spent four non-consecutive weeks in the chart, peaking at number 16. However, on the Melody Maker and the Disc charts, "Travelling Light" and "Dynamite" charted together, topping the chart for seven weeks and six weeks in the respective charts.

"Dynamite" was also released as an EP in Spain in 1959, becoming a top-ten hit. It featured "Travellin' Light" as well as live versions of Ritchie Valens' "Donna" and Elvis Presley's "Danny". In April 1965, "Dynamite" was released as a single and EP in Japan. It became a massive hit, peaking at number 6 on the Tokushin Music Report. Speaking about this, Richard said:

"...quite often we found that records that wouldn't necessarily be a hit here in England were smash hits in Japan. Going back to things like Dynamite... When I go to Japan, I get calls to do Dynamite. Well, I mean, I never did like it very much anyway. And I like it even less now, really. But Japan loved it. It's incredible. And it's such a big market, one has to sort of take notice. I mean you– It sells like half a million copies. So you can't sort of say, 'Well, I'm not going to do it because I don't like it.' I mean, a lot of people liked it. And if you're going to be an entertainer, you gotta do things perhaps you don't like".

== Other takes ==
Several other takes of "Dynamite" by Richard and the Shadows have also been released. A slightly faster version with a different backing and slightly altered lyrics was first released on the Dutch compilation Time to Rock! in 1962 and was later released as the B-side to a re-release of "Move It" in the Netherlands and Belgium in 1968. This version was first released in the UK on the 1987 compilation Rock On with Cliff Richard and has since been included on several other compilations including 25 of the Best of Cliff Richard in 1997. Another alternative take, similar to the other faster take, has also been released on the box set And They Said It Wouldn't Last: My 50 Years in Music in 2008.

In 1980, Richard re-recorded "Dynamite" at Riverside Studios with producer Alan Tarney on bass, Michael Boddicker and Nick Glennie-Smith on synthesisers, and Trevor Spencer on drums. It was released as the B-side to the top-ten hit "Dreamin'". It was later included on Richard's 1984 studio album The Rock Connection and as a bonus track on the 2001 re-release of his 1980 album I'm No Hero.

== Track listing ==
7": Columbia / DB 4351

1. "Travellin' Light" – 2:31
2. "Dynamite" – 1:54

EP: La voz de su amo / 7EPL 13.342 (Spain)

1. "Dynamite" – 1:54
2. "Travellin' Light" – 2:31
3. "Donna" – 3:08
4. "Danny" – 2:52

7": Odeon / OR-1215 (Japan, 1965)

1. "Dynamite" – 1:54
2. "What'd I Say" – 3:00

EP: Odeon / OP-4068 (Japan, 1965)

1. "Dynamite" – 1:54
2. "Constantly" – 2:40
3. "Do You Want to Dance" – 2:16
4. "Evergreen Tree" – 2:40

== Personnel ==
- Cliff Richard – vocals
- Hank Marvin – lead guitar
- Bruce Welch – rhythm guitar
- Jet Harris – bass guitar
- Tony Meehan – drums

== Charts ==
Chart (1959–1960)	Peak position
Spain (Promusicae)	9
UK New Musical Express Top 30	16
US Cash Box Looking Ahead	15

Chart (1965)	Peak position
Japan (Tokushin Music Report)	6
