= Where Do We Go from Here (Cliff Richard song) =

1982 single by Cliff Richard

Single by Cliff Richard

from the album Now You See Me, Now You Don't
- B-side: "Discovering"
- Released: 10 September 1982
- Recorded: January 1982
- Genre: Pop rock
- Length: 2:58
- Label: EMI
- Songwriter: Chris Eaton
- Producers: Cliff Richard, Craig Pruess

Cliff Richard singles chronology
"The Only Way Out" (1982)	"Where Do We Go from Here" (1982)	"Little Town" (1982)

Music video
- "Where Do We Go from Here" on YouTube

"Where Do We Go from Here" is a song recorded by British singer Cliff Richard, released in 1982 as the second single from his album Now You See Me, Now You Don't. The song was written by British singer-songwriter Chris Eaton. The song reached number 22 in Ireland and 27 in Belgium, but only reached number 60 in the UK Singles Chart.

== Critical reception ==
The single was met with a highly satirical and negative review from Simon Hills of Record Mirror. Hills dismissed the song's commercial success, jokingly suggesting that "nobody actually buys Cliff's records" and theorizing that a "drug company" was buying up Richard's "dreadful singles" to keep him in the limelight as proof of a youth-retaining formula. While mockingly considering whether the singer's religious faith or his relationship with tennis player Sue Barker was the secret to his success, Hills concluded that "love's an even bigger mystery than the reason why old men like Cliff have hits." He was also critical of the performance itself, questioning the distinctiveness of the vocals by asking if anyone had ever recognized Richard's voice "before you're told it's Cliff singing."

== Chart performance ==
Chart (1982)	Peak position
Belgium (Ultratop 50 Flanders)	27
Ireland (IRMA)	22
UK Singles (Official Charts)	60
