= Love Me (Buddy Holly song) =

Single by Buddy Holly
- A-side: Blue Days–Black Nights
- Released: 16 April 1956
- Recorded: 26 January 1956
- Studio: Bradley Studios, Nashville, Tennessee
- Genre: Country, Rockabilly
- Length: 2:05
- Label: DECCA 9-29854
- Songwriters: Buddy Holly, Sue Parrish
- Producer: Owen Bradley

Buddy Holly singles chronology
"Love Me" (1956)	"Modern Don Juan" (1956)

Love Me is a song co-written by Buddy Holly, with Lubbock-based songwriter Sue Parrish. It was released on April 16, 1956, by Decca, as the B-side of Holly's debut single "Blue Days–Black Nights". The single was recorded at Bradley Studios in Nashville, with Owen Bradley producing. Due to creative differences, the single had a more country sound than Holly liked and, paired with lack of promotion, was a commercial failure.

== Background ==
Decca Records expressed interest in signing Holly after seeing his group, Buddy and Bob, featuring Bob Montgomery on guitar and Larry Welborn on bass. Holly was signed, with the hope of capitalizing on rock 'n' roll's popularity. Montgomery was rejected by Decca because his voice was deemed "too country", and Welborn was unable to travel due to school.

Due to an inadvertent misspelling on Holly's Decca recording contract, he decided to change his name from Holley to Holly. The "Blue Days–Black Nights"/"Love Me" single was the first release to use that spelling, which Holly retained for the rest of his career.

Holly assembled a new band to record at Bradley's studio, consisting of guitarist Sonny Curtis, who Holly had played with on many live dates, and school friend Don Guess on double bass. During the recording session, the group recorded "Love Me", along with "Don't Come Back Knockin'", "Blue Days–Black Nights", and "Midnight Shift". Recording took place between 7:15 and 10:15 PM on January 26, 1956. The band was supplemented by session musicians Doug Kirkham and Grady Martin on drums and rhythm guitar respectively.

== Release and reception ==
The single was released on April 16, 1956, on Decca Records, as a 45rpm 7" single and a 78rpm 10" single. It was not a commercial success and failed to reach the U.S. charts, selling around 18,000–19,000 copies. The executives at Decca weren't sure whether to market Holly as a rockabilly or country & western performer, and spent little on promoting the single, organizing no publicity beyond a few handout photographs of Holly. However, the "Blue Days–Black Nights"/"Love Me" single garnered a positive review in Billboard magazine. "Love Me" also received a B+ review in Cashbox magazine.

Despite Holly's shortcomings at Decca, the label capitalized on the musician after he found success with the Crickets and later as a solo artist in 1957. "Love Me" was re-released on January 7, 1958, this time backed by "You Are My One Desire", which again failed to chart. "Love Me" was included, along with other songs from the Nashville recordings on the album That'll Be The Day, released in April 1958.

== Personnel ==
- Buddy Holly - vocals
- Sonny Curtis - lead guitar
- Grady Martin - rhythm guitar
- Don Guess - bass
- Doug Kirkham - drums
