= I'm No Hero =

1980 studio album by Cliff Richard

Studio album by Cliff Richard
- Released: 1 September 1980
- Recorded: May–June 1980 at Riverside Recordings, London; mixed at Roundhouse Studios, London
- Genre: Pop rock
- Label: EMI
- Producer: Alan Tarney

Cliff Richard chronology
Rock 'n' Roll Juvenile (1979)	I'm No Hero (1980)	Love Songs (1981)

Singles from I'm No Hero
- 1. "Dreamin'" Released: August 1980 (UK); 2. "A Little in Love" Released: Dec 80 (US), Jan 81 (UK); 3. "In the Night" Released: Dec 1980 (Germany only); 4. "Give a Little Bit More" Released: April 1981 (US/Canada only)

Alternative cover
- US version of the album

Professional ratings
Review scores
Source	Rating
AllMusic	2.5/5 stars

I'm No Hero is the 23rd studio album by Cliff Richard, released in 1980. The album includes three hit singles, of which "Dreamin'" and "A Little in Love" were top 20 hits in both the UK and the US.

== Background ==
Following the success of Richard's 1979 single "We Don't Talk Anymore", which was written and arranged by Alan Tarney, the record company was keen to use his services again. For the follow-up album in 1980, Tarney was employed as producer for the entire album. This gave I'm No Hero a cohesive sound but was criticised at the time for being too unadventurous. The songs on the album were similar in style to "We Don't Talk Anymore", but it was also a success, generating two top 20 singles, while the album itself made the top five in the UK.

With the lead single "Dreamin'" released in August 1980, the album came out a few weeks later. "Dreamin'" became a top 10 hit in both the UK and US, while the follow-up, "A Little in Love", released belatedly in January 1981, reached No.15 in the UK and No.17 in the US. The album itself reached No.4 in the UK Albums Chart, but due to the lack of singles, failed to sustain as lengthy a run in the top 75 as Richard's previous album, Rock 'n' Roll Juvenile. The delayed release of the second single was due to the release of "Suddenly", a duet with Olivia Newton-John, taken from the Xanadu soundtrack. This was also a top 20 hit in the UK and US - making this Richard's most successful period in the American market.

The album received positive reviews and kept Richard high in the charts during this, his revival period. It was also the last time he appeared in the US top 20. The track "Give a Little Bit More", which was co-written by Andy Hill, who was about to become famous as the writer and producer for Bucks Fizz, was released in some countries as a single, as was "In the Night" (not the same as the Barbara Dickson song which was released around that time and also produced by Tarney). "Give a Little Bit More" gave Richard a third hit from the album in the US, peaking at No. 41. This track was unreleased as a single in the UK, where it was covered by Johnny Logan in September 1980, but his version failed to chart.

I'm No Hero was remastered and re-issued on compact disc in July 2001.

== Track listing ==
All tracks written by Alan Tarney, except where noted.

Side one

1. "Take Another Look" – 4:11
2. "Anything I Can Do" – 4:01
3. "A Little in Love" – 3:42
4. "Here (So Doggone Blue)" – 3:50
5. "Give a Little Bit More" (Andy Hill, Jonathan Hodge) – 3:35

Side two

1. "In the Night" (Rod Bowkett) – 3:48
2. "I'm No Hero" (Trevor Spencer, Tarney) – 3:25
3. "Dreamin'" (Leo Sayer, Tarney) – 3:40
4. "A Heart Will Break" (Spencer, Tarney) – 3:59
5. "Everyman" – 4:11

CD bonus tracks (2001 re-issue)

1. "Dynamite" (Ian Ralph Samwell) – 3:12
2. "Keep on Looking" – 3:40

== Personnel ==
- Cliff Richard – vocals
- Alan Tarney – bass guitar, guitars, arrangements
- Trevor Spencer – drums
- Michael Boddicker, Nick Glennie-Smith – keyboards

== Charts and certifications ==
=== Weekly charts ===
Release date	Single title	UK Chart peak	US Chart peak	Australia	Canada	Ireland
August 1980	"Dreamin'"	8	10	4	9^{^}	9
January 1981	"A Little in Love"	15	17	66	4^{^^}	16
May 1981	"Give a Little Bit More"	NR	41	NR	30	NR
Release date	Album title	UK Chart peak	US Chart peak	Australia	Canada	
September 1980	I'm No Hero	4	80	28	25	

NOTES:
^ "Dreaming" also reached no.83 on the Canadian RPM "Top 100 Singles of 1980" chart.
^^ "A Little in Love" also reached no. 33 on the Canadian RPM "Top 100 Singles of 1981" chart.
NR - not released

=== Certifications ===
Region	Certification	Certified units/sales
United Kingdom (BPI)	Gold	100,000^{^}
Canada (Music Canada)	Platinum	100,000^{^}
^{^} Shipments figures based on certification alone.
