= Wired for Sound =

Studio album by Cliff Richard
- Released: 14 September 1981
- Recorded: 1 May 1981 ("Daddy's Home"); 27 May – 9 June 1981
- Venues: Hammersmith Odeon; ("Daddy's Home" only)
- Studios: Gallery Studios, London
- Label: EMI
- Producers: Alan Tarney; Cliff Richard ("Daddy's Home" only)

Cliff Richard chronology
Love Songs (1981)	Wired for Sound (1981)	Now You See Me, Now You Don't (1982)

Singles from Wired for Sound
- 1. "Wired for Sound" Released: 17 August 1981; 2. "Daddy's Home" Released: 6 November 1981

Professional ratings
Review scores
Source	Rating
AllMusic	3.5/5 stars
Smash Hits	7/10

Wired for Sound is the 24th studio album by Cliff Richard, released in September 1981. The album peaked at number 4 in the UK albums chart upon release and spent a total of 25 weeks on the chart in 1981–82. The album was certified Platinum by the BPI and achieved global sales of over one million.

The title track was released as the lead single off the album and was followed up by a cover of Shep and the Limelites 1961 doo-wop hit, "Daddy's Home". The singles peaked at numbers 4 and 2, respectively, on the UK singles chart. "Daddy's Home" was held off number 1 for four consecutive weeks by the Human League's "Don't You Want Me" but earned gold certification from the BPI for sales over half a million. The track was recorded live at the Hammersmith Odeon on 1 May 1981, for a rock 'n' roll special to be broadcast later by BBC Television.

"Broken Doll" is a cover of a Wreckless Eric single from 1980. Reportedly, Richard also wanted to record Eric's "(I'd Go The) Whole Wide World", too, but only if he could change some of the lyrics – which Eric refused. "Young Love" was given new lyrics and retitled "The Last Kiss" for a cover version by David Cassidy featuring George Michael. It was released as the lead single for Cassidy's 1985 album Romance, becoming a top ten hit in the UK and Germany. "Once in a While" was originally recorded by Leo Sayer on his 1980 album Living in a Fantasy and released as a single in the UK and Australia.

The promotional video for the title track is one of Richard's best-known and was filmed around the centre of Milton Keynes, the new town in Buckinghamshire that was developed after the Second World War. It features Richard walking around and on rollerskates while listening to music on a Walkman cassette player; such devices were then newly available in the UK.

A remastered version of the album was issued in July 2001, with the B-sides of both singles included as bonus tracks.

== Track listing ==
All songs written and composed by Alan Tarney except where indicated.

Side one

1. "Wired for Sound" (Tarney, B. A. Robertson) – 3:36
2. "Once in a While" – 4:38
3. "Better Than I Know Myself" (Dave Cooke, Judy MacKenzie) – 3:39
4. "Oh No, Don't Let Go" – 3:37
5. "'Cos I Love That Rock 'n' Roll" – 4:10

Side two

6. "Broken Doll" (Eric Goulden, Walter Hacon) – 4:15
7. "Lost in a Lonely World" (Chris Eaton) – 4:01
8. "Summer Rain" (Eaton) – 4:15
9. "Young Love" – 4:03
10. "Say You Don't Mind" (does not appear on the US release) – 4:01
11. "Daddy's Home" (live) (James Sheppard, William Miller) – 2:56

2001 reissue bonus tracks

12. "Shakin' All Over" (live) (Frederick Heath) (B-side of "Daddy's Home") – 2:43
13. "Hold On" (B-side of "Wired for Sound") – 3:43

== Personnel ==
- Cliff Richard – vocals and backing vocals
- John Clark – guitar on "Lost in a Lonely World"
- Nick Glennie-Smith – piano on "Young Love", engineer
- Graham Jarvis – drums on all tracks except "Once in a While", "Summer Rain" and "Young Love"
- Trevor Spencer – drums on "Once in a While", "Summer Rain" and "Young Love"
- Alan Tarney – all instruments except those listed in credits, backing vocals, arrangements, production
- Rebecca Swearingen – photography

== Charts ==
=== Charts ===
Weekly chart performance for Wired for Sound
Chart (1981–82)	Peak position
Australian Albums (Kent Music Report)	13
Canada Top Albums/CDs (RPM)	23
German Albums (Offizielle Top 100)	44
New Zealand Albums (RMNZ)	4
Norwegian Albums (VG-lista)	22
Swedish Albums (Sverigetopplistan)	39
UK Albums (Official Charts)	4
US Billboard 200	132

=== Year-end charts ===
Year-end chart performance for Wired for Sound
Chart	Position
Australian Albums (Kent Music Report)	33
Canada Top Albums/CDs (RPM)	100
UK Albums (OCC)	31

== Certifications ==
Certifications for Wired for Sound
Region	Certification	Certified units/sales
Australia (ARIA)	Platinum	50,000^{^}
Canada (Music Canada)	Gold	50,000^{^}
New Zealand (RMNZ)	Gold	7,500^{^}
United Kingdom (BPI)	Platinum	300,000^{^}
^{^} Shipments figures based on certification alone.
