= That's How Love Goes =

That's How Love Goes may refer to:

- "That's How Love Goes", a song by Jermaine Jackson from Jermaine
- "That's How Love Goes", a song by Katey Sagal from Well...
- "That's How Love Goes", a song by Boyzone from Where We Belong
