= The Videos (group) =

The Videos were a short-lived American Doo-wop group. The group was formed in 1957 by five individuals who were each seventeen years old.

- Charles Baskerville (second tenor)
- Clarence Bassett (first tenor), previously with The Five Sharps
- Ronald Cussey (often given as Cuffey) (lead, second tenor), previously with The Five Sharps
- Johnny Jackson (baritone), previously with The Five Sharps
- Ronnie Woodhall (lead, bass)

Performing a cover of The Orioles' "At Night" at Amateur Night at the Apollo Theater, the group came to the attention of WWRL disk-jockey Jocko Henderson via Sid Wick. Hendrson arranged a record deal with Philadelphia's Casino Records, and their first release "Trickle Trickle" is considered a doo-wop classic. The record did not chart on Billboard, but did hit #90 on Cashbox. Before the next single could be recorded, Ronald Cussey had been diagnosed with leukemia and Ronnie Woodhall had died. With a lead singer and a second tenor gone the group had ended before any momentum could be established. Charles Baskerville and Clarence Bassett then became members of Shep and the Limelites.
