= Love Songs (Cliff Richard album) =

1981 compilation album by Cliff Richard

Compilation album by Cliff Richard
- Released: 15 June 1981
- Genre: Soft rock
- Label: EMI
- Producer: Various

Cliff Richard chronology
I'm No Hero (1980)	Love Songs (1981)	Wired for Sound (1981)

Love Songs is a compilation album of ballads by Cliff Richard released by EMI in 1981. The album spent five weeks at the top of the UK album charts in 1981 and two weeks at the top of the Australian album charts in 1982.

The compilation spans a 20-year period, from "Theme for a Dream" (1960) through to "A Little in Love" (1980).

== Track listing ==
1. "Miss You Nights"
2. "Constantly"
3. "Up in the World"
4. "Carrie"
5. "A Voice in the Wilderness"
6. "The Twelfth of Never"
7. "I Could Easily Fall (In Love with You)"
8. "The Day I Met Marie"
9. "Can't Take the Hurt Anymore"
10. "A Little in Love"
11. "The Minute You're Gone"
12. "Visions"
13. "When Two Worlds Drift Apart"
14. "The Next Time"
15. "It's All in the Game"
16. "Don't Talk to Him"
17. "When the Girl in Your Arms Is the Girl in Your Heart"
18. "Theme for a Dream"
19. "Fall in Love with You"
20. "We Don't Talk Anymore"

== Charts ==
=== Weekly charts ===
Chart (1981–1982)	Peak position
UK Albums (OCC)	1
Australian Albums (Kent Music Report)	1
New Zealand Albums (RMNZ)	2

=== Year-end charts ===
Chart (1981/1982)	Position
United Kingdom 1981 (OCC)	7
Australia 1982 (Kent Music Report)	28

== Certifications ==
Region	Certification	Certified units/sales
Australia (ARIA)	3× Platinum	150,000^{^}
New Zealand (RMNZ)	Platinum	15,000^{^}
United Kingdom (BPI)	Platinum	300,000^{^}
^{^} Shipments figures based on certification alone.

Note: Although the New Zealand reference only shows the certification of Love Songs to be Gold, it was later certified Platinum.
