= The Millennium Prayer =

Single by Cliff Richard
- B-side: "Two Worlds"
- Released: 15 November 1999
- Recorded: August 1999
- Studio: Skratch Studio/Surrey & Whitfield Street Studios/London
- Genre: Pop
- Length: 4:41
- Label: Papillon
- Songwriters: Paul Field; Stephen Deal; Cliff Richard; Nigel Wright; Robert Burns; Jesus; Dave Arch; Anne Skates
- Producer: Nigel Wright

Cliff Richard singles chronology
"The Miracle" (1999)	"The Millennium Prayer" (1999)	"Somewhere Over the Rainbow" (2001)

"The Millennium Prayer" is a song recorded by English singer Cliff Richard, in which the words of the Lord's Prayer are set to the tune of "Auld Lang Syne". It was released in November 1999 as a charity single in the lead-up to the new millennium, hence the name. The single became a surprise hit reaching number one in the UK, number two in Australia and New Zealand, number three in Ireland, and the top 20 in a number of European countries.

== Background ==
The original adaption of "The Lord's Prayer" to "Auld Lang Syne" (a contrafactum) was created by composer Paul Field and writer Stephen Deal as the finale to the Christian musical Hopes & Dreams (a Share Jesus International production). It is the only single that credits Jesus as a lyricist. The original recording of the song, also sung by Richard, featured on the musical's soundtrack album Hopes & Dreams: A New Musical For A New Millennium released in January 1999. Paul Field had also told Richard of his wife's suggestion, "that it would make a great Christmas single for Cliff." Richard took up the suggestion and recorded a new version for release as a single in the lead up to Christmas, with Field hearing of the recording from Richard after it had been recorded.

== Release and live performances ==
Richard's record label, EMI, declined to release it amid concerns about its commercial potential, so Richard approached the independent record label Papillon Records for the release, with the proceeds going to the charity Children's Promise.

Richard performed the song exclusively on the TV programme An Audience with... Cliff Richard before a music video had been made for it.

The song was Richard's 14th UK No. 1 hit, his 112th hit overall, and the third highest-selling single of his career. The song was listed No. 2 of all-time worst singles in a poll run by Channel 4 in 2003. The song won the Ivor Novello Award for the best selling single of 1999.

Although the version Richard released as a single was not taken from any album, the following year the song was included on his compilation album The Whole Story: His Greatest Hits, and in 2003 on his album Cliff at Christmas.

== Charts and certifications ==
=== Weekly charts ===
Weekly chart performance
Chart (1999–2000)	Peak position
Australia (ARIA)	2
Belgium (Ultratop 50 Flanders)	18
Europe (Eurochart Hot 100)	5
Germany (GfK)	23
Ireland (IRMA)	3
Netherlands (Dutch Top 40)	14
Netherlands (Single Top 100)	12
New Zealand (Recorded Music NZ)	2
Scottish Singles Sales (Official Charts)	1
Switzerland (Schweizer Hitparade)	19
UK Singles (Official Charts)	1
UK Indie (Official Charts)	1

=== Year-end charts ===
Annual chart rankings
Chart (1999)	Position
Australia (ARIA)	23
UK Singles (OCC)	3

=== Certifications ===
Certifications and sales
Region	Certification	Certified units/sales
Australia (ARIA)	2× Platinum	140,000^{^}
New Zealand (RMNZ)	2× Platinum	20,000^{*}
United Kingdom (BPI)	Platinum	600,000^{^}
^{*} Sales figures based on certification alone.^{^} Shipments figures based on certification alone.
