= Treasure of Love (Clyde McPhatter song) =

Single by Clyde McPhatter

from the album Clyde McPhatter & The Drifters
- B-side: "When You're Sincere"
- Released: April 1956
- Genre: R&B
- Length: 2:07
- Label: Atlantic
- Songwriters: Joe Shapiro, Lou Stallman

Clyde McPhatter singles chronology
"Seven Days" (1955)	"Treasure of Love" (1956)	"I'm Lonely Tonight" (1956)

"Treasure of Love" is a song written by Joe Shapiro and Lou Stallman and performed by Clyde McPhatter . It was featured on the 1956 album Clyde McPhatter & The Drifters. "Treasure of Love" reached No. 1 on the U.S. R&B chart, No. 16 on the U.S. pop chart. Overseas, the song went to No. 27 on the UK Singles Chart.

== Cover versions ==
- Dorothy Collins released a cover version of the song as a single in 1956, but it did not chart. It was arranged by Dick Jacobs.
- Pat Boone released a version of the song on his 1957 EP "Pat" on Mike.
- Tommy Steele released a version of the song on his 1957 album Tommy Steele Stage Show.
- Johnny Burnette released a version of the song on his 1961 album Johnny Burnette Sings.
- Ruth Brown released a version of the song on her 1962 album Along Came Ruth. It was arranged by Jerry Kennedy.
- Jill Jackson released a version of the song as a single in 1965, but it did not chart. It was produced by Jimmy Bowen and arranged by Bill Justis.
- B. J. Thomas released a version of the song as a single in 1966, but it did not chart.
- Ronnie Hawkins released a version of the song on his 1971 album The Hawk. It was produced by Tom Dowd.
- John Holt released a version of the song on his 1972 album Pledging My Love.
- Mel Carter released a version of the song as a single in 1973, but it did not chart. It was produced by Bob Marcucci.
- Cliff Richard and the London Philharmonic Orchestra released a version of the song on their 1983 album Dressed for the Occasion. It was produced by Richard Anthony Hewson and Richard and arranged by Hewson.
- The Persuasions released a version of the song on their 1984 album No Frills.
- Dion released a version of the song on his 1986 album Velvet and Steel.
