= Daddy's Home (song) =

1961 single by Shep and the Limelites

Single by Shep and the Limelites
- B-side: "This I Know"
- Released: March 1961
- Genre: Doo-wop, R&B
- Length: 2:47
- Label: Hull
- Songwriters: James "Shep" Sheppard, Clarence Bassett, Charles Baskerville

Shep and the Limelites singles chronology
| "I'm So Lonely" (1961) | "Daddy's Home" (1961) | "Ready for Your Love" (1961) |

"Daddy's Home" is a song by American doo-wop group Shep and the Limelites. The song was written by the three members of the band, James "Shep" Sheppard (1935–1970), Clarence Bassett (1936–2005) and Charles Baskerville. The group recorded the original version of "Daddy's Home" on February 1, 1961, and it was released on Hull Records in March 1961 with the B-side being "This I Know".

The song is considered a sequel to the Heartbeats' song "A Thousand Miles Away", with the closing line in the coda being: "I'm not a thousand miles away".

"Daddy's Home" reached no. 2 on the Billboard popular music chart in May 1961. It was kept from No.1 by "Travelin' Man" by Ricky Nelson.

Later songs by the band were not as successful as "Daddy's Home", but still sold well.

== Part of a song cycle ==
The song is an example of James Sheppard's legacy of composing of rock 'n' roll's first-ever song cycle titles, telling the story of a relationship, beginning with going home to his girl, and further twists along the way, like getting married, celebrating their anniversary, problems encountered etc. The songs that told this story cycle were famously "A Thousand Miles Away", "500 Miles to Go", both with the Heartbeats; and continued with "Daddy's Home", "Three Steps from the Altar," "Our Anniversary", and "What Did Daddy Do?" for Shep and the Limelites.

== Charts ==
=== Weekly charts ===
| Chart (1961) | Peak position |
|---|---|
| Canada (CHUM Hit Parade) | 11 |
| US Billboard Hot 100 | 2 |
| US Cash Box Top 100 | 3 |

=== Year-end charts ===
| Chart (1961) | Rank |
|---|---|
| US Billboard Hot 100 | 41 |
| US Cash Box Top 100 | 27 |

== Covers ==
The song was covered by many artists including P. J. Proby (1970), Frank Zappa (1971), Jermaine Jackson (1972), Toots and the Maytals (Funky Kingston 1973), The Carpenters (‘’Live In Japan’’ 1974, Richard Carpenter lead), Junior English, Cliff Richard (1981) and Tim Maia (1997)

=== Jermaine Jackson ===
"Daddy's Home"

Single by Jermaine Jackson

from the album Jermaine
- B-side: "Take Me in Your Arms (Rock Me for a Little While)"
- Released: November 15, 1972
- Recorded: 1972
- Studio: Motown
- Genre: Doo-wop; R&B
- Length: 2:59
- Label: Motown
- Songwriters: James "Shep" Sheppard, Clarence Bassett, Charles Baskerville

Jermaine Jackson singles chronology
| "That's How Love Goes" (1972) | "Daddy's Home" (1972) | "You're in Good Hands" (1973) |

Jermaine Jackson covered the song for his 1972 debut solo album, Jermaine, and it was released as the second single from the album. His version featured the rest of the Jackson 5 on backing vocals. The single peaked at number 9 on the US Billboard Hot 100 and number 3 in Canada in March 1973. The song sold over 1 million copies in the US.

Record World said of this version "Beautifully produced, this funky ballad should be a natural winner."

His version was sampled in the 1973 break-in record "Super Fly Meets Shaft" (US #31).

==== Weekly charts ====
| Chart (1973) | Peak position |
|---|---|
| Australia (Kent Music Report) | 27 |
| Canada RPM Top Singles | 3 |
| Netherlands | 10 |
| US Billboard Hot 100 | 9 |
| US Billboard Best Selling Soul Singles | 3 |
| US Cash Box Top 100 | 7 |

===== Year-end charts =====
| Chart (1973) | Rank |
|---|---|
| Canada | 38 |
| US Cash Box Top 100 | 45 |

=== Cliff Richard version ===
"Daddy's Home (live)"

Single by Cliff Richard

from the album Wired for Sound
- B-side: "Shakin' All Over (live)"
- Released: November 6, 1981
- Recorded: May 1, 1981
- Venue: Hammersmith Odeon
- Genre: Pop, Doo-wop
- Length: 2:55
- Label: EMI
- Songwriters: James Sheppard, Clarence Bassett, Charles Baskerville
- Producer: Cliff Richard

Cliff Richard singles chronology
| "Wired for Sound" (1981) | "Daddy's Home (live)" (1981) | "The Only Way Out" (1982) |

Music video
- "Daddy's Home" on YouTube

British singer Cliff Richard released a live version as a single for the Christmas period in 1981. It was the second single from his 1981 album Wired for Sound.

The song became an international hit reaching number 2 on the UK Singles Chart and number 23 on US Billboard Hot 100 in March 1982 — nearly twenty years after the release of the original by Shep and the Limelites. In Britain, it was certified Gold by the BPI for sales over 500,000.

A video clip was recorded to accompany the single release instead of using footage of the original BBC live recording.

==== Charts and certifications ====
===== Weekly charts =====
| Chart (1981–1982) | Peak position |
|---|---|
| Australia (Kent Music Report) | 8 |
| Canada (RPM 50 Singles) | 41 |
| Finland (IFPI Finland) | 20 |
| Belgium (Ultratop 50 Flanders) | 8 |
| Germany (GfK) | 73 |
| Ireland (IRMA) | 3 |
| Netherlands (Dutch Top 40) | 14 |
| Netherlands (Single Top 100) | 14 |
| New Zealand (Recorded Music NZ) | 4 |
| UK Singles (Official Charts) | 2 |
| US Billboard Hot 100 | 23 |
| US Adult Contemporary (Billboard) | 3 |
| US Cash Box Top 100 | 22 |

===== Year-end charts =====
| Chart (1981) | Position |
|---|---|
| UK Singles (OCC) | 27 |
| Chart (1982) | Position |
| Australia (Kent Music Report) | 76 |
| Belgium (Ultratop Flanders) | 94 |
| US Adult Contemporary (Billboard) | 50 |

==== Certifications ====
| Region | Certification | Certified units/sales |
|---|---|---|
| United Kingdom (BPI) | Gold | 500,000^{^} |
^{^} Shipments figures based on certification alone.
