= The Heartbeats (doo-wop group) =

American musical group (1953–1959)

The Heartbeats were a 1950s American doo-wop group best known for their song "A Thousand Miles Away", which charted at No. 53 in the US Billboard listings in 1957.

== Career ==
The Heartbeats began as a quartet in early 1953 in Jamaica, Queens, New York, as "The Hearts", consisting of baritone Vernon Sievers, bass Wally Roker, first tenor Albert Crump, and second tenor Robbie Tatum. When it was later discovered that there was a female group of the same name (who scored a minor Billboard hit with "Lonely Nights"), the male group extended their name to "Heartbeats". They were signed shortly after James "Shep" Sheppard joined the group as lead vocalist and were shuffled between various production companies and record labels over the next few years. The group split up in 1959 and Sheppard went on to form Shep and the Limelites. Roker remained in the music business as a promoter while the other group members went on to other professions. James Sheppard died in his automobile on January 24, 1970, from gunshot injuries sustained during an attempted robbery on the Long Island Expressway.

On May 13, 2003, the four original surviving Heartbeats, joined by Walter Crump (Albert's brother) on lead vocals, reunited for the PBS special Rock and Roll at 50 at the Benedum Center in Pittsburgh, Pennsylvania. Later that same year on December 27, they reunited again for their 50th anniversary at a meeting of the United in Group Harmony Association in New Jersey. Albert Crump and Robbie Tatum retired from performing shortly thereafter.

The Heartbeats recently consisted of original members Wally Roker (bass) and Vernon Sievers (baritone), lead vocalist Walter Crump, and two members of the 1980s lineup of Shep and The Limelites, Ron Bassett (second tenor) and Randy Reid (first tenor).

Original first tenor Albert Crump died of cancer on October 3, 2012, at age 75. Wally Roker died on December 2, 2015, following brain surgery, at the age of 78.

== Singles ==
- "A Thousand Miles Away"
- "Crazy For You"
- "I Won't Be the Fool Anymore"
- "500 Miles to Go"
- "After New Year's Eve"
- "Down on My Knees"
- "Your Way"
- "People Are Talking"
- "One Million Years"
- "Darling, How Long?"
- "Tormented"
