= A Little in Love (Cliff Richard song) =

1980 single by Cliff Richard

Single by Cliff Richard

from the album I'm No Hero
- B-side: "Keep on Looking" (Europe); "Everyman" (North America)
- Released: 9 December 1980 (US); 12 January 1981 (UK)
- Recorded: May–June 1980
- Studio: Riverside Studios, London
- Genre: Soft rock, pop rock
- Length: 3:23 (single), 3:42 (LP)
- Label: EMI
- Songwriter: Alan Tarney
- Producer: Alan Tarney

Cliff Richard singles chronology
"Suddenly" (1980)	"A Little in Love" (1980)	"Wired for Sound" (1981)

Music video
- "A Little in Love" on YouTube

"A Little in Love" is a song recorded by Cliff Richard, released as the second single from his 1980 album, I'm No Hero. The song spent five months on the U.S. Billboard Hot 100, peaking at number 17. It reached number 15 on the UK Singles Chart, reached the Top 5 in Canada and was a hit in numerous European countries.

"A Little in Love" was the follow-up single to "Dreamin'" from Richard's I'm No Hero album. Its release was delayed as a result of his intervening duet with Olivia Newton-John, "Suddenly" from the Xanadu soundtrack. In the US and Canada, "A Little in Love" was followed by "Give a Little Bit More" as the third single from the album, while in Germany "A Little in Love" was released as the third single after "In the Night". The UK and most other regions had no third single released from the album.

== Chart performance ==
=== Weekly charts ===
Chart (1980–81)	Peak position
Australia (Kent Music Report)	66
Belgium (Ultratop 50 Flanders)	25
Canada (RPM 50 Singles)	4
Canada (CHUM Radio Networks)	2
Ireland (IRMA)	16
Luxembourg (Radio Luxembourg)	6
Netherlands (Single Top 100)	38
New Zealand (Recorded Music NZ)	29
UK Singles (Official Charts)	15
US Billboard Hot 100	17
US Billboard Adult Contemporary	6
US Cash Box Top 100	15

=== Year-end charts ===
Chart (1981)	Rank
Australia (Kent Music Report)	178
Canada	33
US Billboard Hot 100	61
US Cash Box Top 100	99
