= A Thousand Miles Away =

Single by The Heartbeats
- B-side: "Oh Baby Don't"
- Released: October 1956 (US)
- Genre: Doo-wop
- Length: 2:22
- Label: Hull, Rama
- Songwriter(s): James Sheppard and William H. Miller

"A Thousand Miles Away" is a 1956 song recorded by the American doo-wop group The Heartbeats. The song was written by James Sheppard and William H. Miller. The sequel, "Daddy's Home", also written by Sheppard and performed by his group Shep and the Limelites, was released in 1961. It did even better on the charts, reaching #2 on the US Billboard Hot 100.

== Background ==
Sheppard co-wrote the song after his ex-girlfriend moved away to Texas.

== Track listing ==
7" Vinyl

1. a. "A Thousand Miles Away" - 2:22
2. b. "Oh Baby Don't" - 2:25

== Chart performance ==
- "A Thousand Miles Away" reached #5 on the R&B Singles chart and #52 in the US on The Billboard Hot 100.
- A 1960, reissue had the song peak at #96 on the Hot 100.

== Cover versions ==
Other artists who have released a cover versions of the song are:

- The Fleetwoods
- The Diamonds
- Harry Nilsson

== In popular culture ==
The song was featured in the 1973 film American Graffiti.
