= We Should Be Together (Cliff Richard song) =

Single by Cliff Richard

from the album Together with Cliff Richard
- B-side: "Miss You Nights (Live)"
- Released: 25 November 1991
- Recorded: 19 July 1991
- Studio: RG Jones, London, UK
- Genre: Christmas; pop
- Length: 4:20
- Label: EMI
- Songwriter: Bruce Roberts
- Producer: Cliff Richard / Paul Moessl

Cliff Richard singles chronology
"More to Life" (1991)	"We Should Be Together" (1991)	"This New Year" (1991)

Music video
- "We Should Be Together" on YouTube

"We Should Be Together" is a Christmas-themed song by British singer and actor Cliff Richard. Released as a single in November 1991 in the UK by EMI Records, the song was considered a contender for the Christmas number one spot but peaked at number 10. The song differed from Richard's previous Christmas efforts—primarily being a love song. The promotional video for the single depicts an offshore oil worker who makes the journey back to his home to join his family for Christmas. In the song, at around 3 minutes and 44 seconds, the solo trumpet quotes the second theme from the second movement of Dvořák's New World Symphony. This quote bears significance to the song, as Dvořák wrote this symphony when he was missing his home.

== Charts ==
The song peaked at No.10 in December 1991 in the UK Chart - ultimately the coveted Christmas No.1 single of that year went to Queen's Bohemian Rhapsody which was re-released following the death of Freddie Mercury in the November of that year.

Chart (1991)	Peak position
Ireland (IRMA)	9
UK Singles (OCC)	10
UK Airplay (Music Week)	36
