= That'll Be the Day (album) =

Studio album by Buddy Holly
- Released: April 1958
- Recorded: January 26, July 22, November 15, 1956
- Studio: Bradley Studios, Nashville, Tennessee
- Genre: Rockabilly; country; rock and roll
- Length: 25:06
- Label: Decca
- Producer: Owen Bradley

Buddy Holly chronology
Buddy Holly (1958)	That'll Be the Day (1958)	The Buddy Holly Story (1959)

Singles from That'll Be the Day
- 1. "Blue Days–Black Nights" / Love Me" Released: 16 Apr 1956; 2. "Modern Don Juan" / "You Are My One Desire" Released: 24 Dec 1956; 3. "That'll Be the Day" / "Rock Around With Ollie Vee" Released: 12 Aug 1957; 4. "Love Me" / "You Are My One Desire" Released: 6 Jan 1958; 5. ""Girl On My Mind" / "Ting-A-Ling"" Released: 23 Jun 1958

Professional ratings
Review scores
Source	Rating
Allmusic	3/5 stars

That'll Be The Day is the second and final studio album from Buddy Holly. Decca, Holly's first major record label, after failing to produce a hit single from Holly's early recordings, packaged these 1956 tunes after he had some success with recordings from the Brunswick and Coral labels, especially the previously released single "That'll Be the Day". This is the last album released before his death in a plane crash on February 3, 1959, and is rare among collectors.

== Background ==
Recordings were done in three different sessions typically running just 3 hours long, January, July and November 1956 at the Bradley Film and Recording Studio at 804 16th Avenue South in Nashville, Tennessee. From these sessions a single was released on April 16, 1956 (D 29854), "Blue Days–Black Nights" / "Love Me". A second single "Modern Don Juan" / "You Are My One Desire" (D 30166) was released December 24, 1956. Low sales convinced Decca to shelve the remaining tracks.

When Buddy Holly found new fame with his re-recording of "That'll Be the Day" with his band the Crickets, Decca began to issue Holly's recordings from these sessions as singles, which culminated in a full-length LP as well as an accompanying EP.

The Decca 1956 Nashville recordings were repackaged several times. Instruments and background vocals were added with later releases as late as 1984. The mid-1970s British album The Nashville Sessions is the best of the vinyl editions according to Allmusic.

The album reached no. 5 on the UK album chart in 1961 in a re-release. The album was re-released in 1967 under the title The Great Buddy Holly.

== Track listing ==
Side 1
No.	Title	Writer(s)	Length
1.	"You Are My One Desire"	Don Guess	2:23
2.	"Blue Days–Black Nights"	Ben Hall	2:04
3.	"Modern Don Juan"	Don Guess, Jack Neal	2:39
4.	"Rock Around With Ollie Vee" (with the Three Tunes)	Sonny Curtis	2:18
5.	"Ting a Ling" (with the Three Tunes)	Ahmet Ertegun	2:41
6.	"Girl on My Mind" (with the Three Tunes)	Don Guess	2:18

Side 2
No.	Title	Writer(s)	Length
1.	"That'll Be the Day" (with the Three Tunes) (July 22, 1956 Decca version)	Buddy Holly, Jerry "J.I." Allison	2:30
2.	"Love Me"	Buddy Holly, Sue Parrish	2:07
3.	"I'm Changing All Those Changes" (with the Three Tunes)	Buddy Holly	2:14
4.	"Don't Come Back Knockin'"	Buddy Holly, Sue Parrish	2:14
5.	"Midnight Shift"	Earl Lee, Jimmie Ainsworth	2:10

1999 Bonus tracks

No.	Title	Writer(s)	Length
1.	"Rock Around With Ollie Vee (No.2)"	Sonny Curtis	2:14
2.	"Changing All Those Changes" (Demo)	Buddy Holly	1:39

== Personnel ==
- Buddy Holly* – vocal & guitar
- Sonny Curtis* – lead guitar
- Grady Martin* – rhythm guitar
- Doug Kirkham* – bass and percussion
- Don Guess* – bass
- Jerry Allison* – drums
- Harold Bradley – guitar
- Floyd Cramer – piano
- Farris Coursey – drums
- E.R. "Dutch" McMillin – saxophone
- Owen Bradley – piano

* line up on July 22 credited as "The Three Tunes". According to buddyhollycenter.org the group name was Buddy and the Two Tones (i.e. Buddy Holly with Don Guess and Sonny Curtis).

- Owen Bradley produced the sessions.
- The Picks added background harmonies on later releases. Not on the original recordings and releases.

== Charts ==
=== Album ===
Chart (1961)	Peak position
UK Album Chart	5
