= Nutshell (band) =

British Christian musical group

Nutshell were a British Christian musical group, active from the early 1970s up to 1981.

== Career ==
The band were originally called Jesus Revolution, and the members were Paul Field, Heather Barlow and Pam Thiele (née May). They had changed the name by the time of their first release, In Your Eyes (1976). The following year they released their second LP, Flyaway (1977).

After the second LP had been released Barlow and Thiele left the group; Field began again with two new female vocalists, Annie McCaig and Mo McCafferty. They released two further LPs, Begin Again (1978) and Believe it or Not (1979). After the release of Believe it or Not, the band changed its name to Network 3 and released two singles, "Last Train Home" (1980) and "Dangerous Game" (1981), both of which were produced by Cliff Richard and featured his backing vocals.

The band broke up after this, and a Best of Nutshell LP was released in 1981.

Whilst Barlow and Thiele left the music business, Field built up a successful career as a solo singer, songwriter and producer. McCaig and McCafferty also remained in the music business, providing backing vocals for numerous artists.

Ken Scott has described Nutshell, at their best, as an English version of the American Christian folk group 2nd Chapter of Acts.

== Discography ==
Nutshell

=== Albums ===
- In Your Eyes (1976, Myrrh Records, MYR1029)
- Flyaway (1977, Myrrh, MYR1056)
- Begin Again (1978, Myrrh, MYR1067)
- Believe it or Not (1979, Myrrh, MYR1084)
- Best of Nutshell (1981, Myrrh, MYR1099)

=== Singles ===
- "Flyaway" (1977, Myrrh, 178, US only)

Network 3

- "Last Train Home" (1981, EMI, single, 5120)
- "Dangerous Game" (1981, EMI, single, 5205)
