= Travellin' Light (Cliff Richard song) =

1959 single by Cliff Richard and the Shadows

Single by Cliff Richard and the Shadows
- B-side: "Dynamite"
- Released: 2 October 1959
- Recorded: 25 July 1959
- Studio: EMI Studios, London
- Genre: Pop
- Length: 2:31
- Label: Columbia
- Songwriters: Sid Tepper; Roy C. Bennett
- Producer: Norrie Paramor

Cliff Richard and the Shadows singles chronology
"Living Doll" (1959)	"Travellin' Light" (1959)	"A Voice in the Wilderness" (1960)

"Travellin' Light" is a song by Cliff Richard and the Shadows, released as a single in October 1959. It was the follow-up single to Richard's first UK number one, "Living Doll", and also reached that peak, remaining at the top of the New Musical Express chart for five weeks. "Travellin' Light" was also a number-one hit in Ireland and Norway, selling 1.59 million copies worldwide.

== Background and release ==
Songwriters Sid Tepper and Roy C. Bennett originally wrote "Travellin' Light" for a scene in the 1958 Elvis Presley film King Creole. However, the scene was subsequently cut from the film.

Richard's previous single saw the start of his transition from rock and roll to ballads, with the country pop song "Living Doll". Following its success, producer Norrie Paramor told Richard to sing another country-tinged song, "Travellin' Light". The song was recorded on 25 July 1959 at EMI Studios, backed by the Drifters, who prior to the single's release changed their name to the Shadows to avoid confusion with the American group. "Travellin' Light" was released as a single on 2 October 1959 backed with "Dynamite".

== Personnel ==
- Cliff Richard – vocals
- Hank Marvin – lead guitar
- Bruce Welch – rhythm guitar
- Jet Harris – bass guitar
- Tony Meehan – drums

== Chart performance ==
Chart (1959)	Peak position
Australia (Kent Music Report)	57
Belgium (Ultratop 50 Wallonia)	38
Ireland (Evening Herald)	1
Netherlands (Single Top 100)	15
Norway (VG-lista)	1
Sweden (Sverigetopplistan)	4
UK Disc Top 20	1
UK Melody Maker Top 20	1
UK New Musical Express Top 30	1
UK Record Mirror Top 20	1
US Music Vendor Beat of the Week Heading for the Top 100	7
