= The Rock Connection =

1984 studio album by Cliff Richard

Studio album by Cliff Richard
- Released: 19 November 1984
- Recorded: 1983–1984 at Strawberry Studios South; 1984 at Gallery Studios (London); 1982 at Eden Studios; 1980 at Riverside Recordings (London)
- Genre: Pop rock; rock and roll; rock; hard rock
- Label: EMI
- Producer: Cliff Richard; Keith Bessey; Craig Pruess; Stuart Colman; Alan Tarney; Rod Houison

Cliff Richard chronology
Walking in the Light (1984)	The Rock Connection (1984)	Always Guaranteed (1987)

Singles from The Rock Connection
- 1. "Shooting from the Heart" Released: October 1984; 2. "Heart User" Released: January 1985

Alternative cover
- Cover for the Australian release

The Rock Connection is the twenty-seventh solo studio album by Cliff Richard. Released in November 1984 on EMI, the album is a part studio, part compilation album. It includes seven studio tracks recorded exclusively for the album, five tracks from the previous year's limited release album Rock 'n' Roll Silver, one previously released single, and one B-side from 1980.

The album reached number 43 on the UK Albums Chart. Two singles were released to promote the album. "Shooting from the Heart" was released in October 1984 as the lead single, but only reached number 51 on the UK Singles Chart. "Heart User" was followed in January 1985 and it only reached number 46. However, a remix of the hit single "She Means Nothing to Me" - a duet with Phil Everly of the Everly Brothers featuring Mark Knopfler - was also included although released almost two years prior. Originally released in January 1983 and lifted from Phil Everly's self-titled solo album, "She Means Nothing to Me" made it to number 9 on the UK Singles Chart. The remix version increased the volume of the vocals and ends with a held note instead of a fade.

== Critical reception ==
Reviewing for AllMusic, critic Bruce Eder wrote of the album "The resulting album was decidedly uneven -- much of it came off as a loud, lean, crisp mix of rock & roll and power pop, Richard's voice surrounded by (and often immersed beneath) in-your-face electric guitars and synthesizers."

== Track listing ==
1. "Heart User" (Terry Britten, Sue Shifrin) - 3:40
2. "Willie and the Hand Jive" (Johnny Otis) - 3:52
3. "Lovers and Friends" (Jon Sweet, Rod Trott) - 4:32
4. "Never Be Anyone Else But You" (Baker Knight) - 4:03
5. "La Gonave" (Cliff Richard) - 3:57
6. "Over You" (Dave Cooke, Richard) - 3:11
7. "Shooting from the Heart" (Roger Greenaway) - 3:09
8. "Learning How to Rock and Roll" (Drew McCulloch) - 3:12
9. "Lucille" (Albert Collins, Little Richard) - 3:37
10. "Be-Bop-A-Lula" (Gene Vincent, Donald Graves, Bill "Sheriff Tex" Davis) - 3:15
11. "Donna" (Ritchie Valens) - 4:21
12. "Dynamite" (Ian Samwell) - 3:11
13. "She Means Nothing to Me" with Phil Everly (John David) - 3:34
14. "Makin' History" (Mark Griffiths, Graham Lyle) - 3:47

Additional tracks

Bonus tracks on the 2004 release
1. "Move It" (Ian Samwell) - 3:06
2. "Teddy Bear" (Bernie Lowe, Kal Mann) - 3:06
3. "It'll Be Me" (Jack Clement) - 3:13
4. "Little Bitty Pretty One" (Bobby Day) - 2:42
5. "Tutti Frutti" (Dorothy LaBostrie, Joe Lubin, Little Richard) - 2:26
6. "I'll Mend Your Broken Heart" (Stewart Blandamer) - 3:24

== Personnel ==
Tracks 1–3, 6–8

- Cliff Richard - producer, lead and backing vocals
- Keith Bessey - producer, engineer
- John Clark - guitars
- Mark Griffiths - bass guitar
- Stuart Tosh - drums
- Dave Cooke - keyboards
- Alan Park - keyboards

Tracks 4, 9–11, 14–19

- Cliff Richard - producer, lead vocals
- Thunder - producer
- Keith Bessey - engineer
- John Clark - guitars
- Martin Jenner - guitars
- Mark Griffiths - bass guitar
- Graham Jarvis - drums
- Dave Cooke - keyboards
- Alan Park - keyboards
- Stuart Calver - backing vocals
- Tony Rivers - backing vocals
- John Perry - backing vocals

Track 5

- Cliff Richard - producer, lead vocals, backing vocals
- Craig Pruess - producer, keyboards, programming
- Keith Bessey - engineer
- John Clark - guitars
- Mark Griffiths - bass guitar
- Graham Jarvis - drums

Track 12

- Alan Tarney - producer, bass guitar
- Ashley Howe - engineer
- Cliff Richard - lead and backing vocals
- Trevor Spencer - drums
- Nick Glennie-Smith - synthesizer
- Michael Boddicker - synthesizer

Tracks 13 & 20

- Phil Everly/Cliff Richard - lead vocals, backing vocals
- Stuart Colman - producer, lead guitar, bass guitar, percussion
- Rod Houison - engineer, percussion
- Neil King - engineer
- John David - guitar
- Mark Knopfler - guitars
- Billy Bremmer - guitars
- Mickey Gee - rhythm guitar
- Pete Wingfield - piano
- Terry Williams - drums

== Chart performance ==
Chart (1984)	Position
Australia Albums (Kent Music Report)	30
New Zealand Albums (RMNZ)	21
UK Albums (OCC)	43

== Sales and certifications ==
Region	Certification	Certified units/sales
United Kingdom (BPI)	Silver	60,000^{^}
^{^} Shipments figures based on certification alone.
