= Evelyn Danzig =

American songwriter (1902–1996)

Evelyn Danzig Levine
- Born: January 16, 1902; Waco, Texas, U.S.
- Died: July 26, 1996 (aged 94); Los Angeles, California, U.S.
- Education: Academy of Holy Name Conversatory
- Occupations: Songwriter, pianist
- Family: Allison Danzig (brother)

Evelyn Danzig Levine (January 16, 1902 – July 26, 1996) was an American Tin Pan Alley songwriter, who was best known for co-writing the music for the folk style ballad popular song "Scarlet Ribbons", published in 1949, with lyrics by her collaborator Jack Segal.

== Biography ==
Danzig, the youngest of six children born to Ethel and Morris Danzig (from Danzig), was born in Waco, Texas, the sister of Allison Danzig, a noted sports writer for The New York Times from 1923 through 1967. She studied at the Academy of Holy Name Conservatory at Albany, New York, then piano and composition in New York under the tutorship of Sigismund Stojowski. She became a professional pianist and played on many radio stations – in the 1930s, she had her own radio program out of New York City called Treble and Clef – and she composed music for theatrical purposes.

"Scarlet Ribbons" was written in only 15 minutes in 1949 at Danzig's home in Port Washington, New York, after she invited lyricist Segal to hear her music. Recordings of the song by Juanita Hall and Dinah Shore made no great impression but in 1952 Harry Belafonte, at his third session for RCA Records, covered the song with an arrangement using only a guitar and male vocal group, and made the song a hit in concert. The four-year-old recording finally became a major success in 1956.

In 1959, the Browns recorded a top 20 hit version of the song, that peaked at Number 13 on the Billboard Hot 100 chart. Joan Baez, a huge fan of Belafonte, included the hit on her demo "San Francisco" album in 1964.

The song was both writers' most successful. Segal had other hits such as "When Sunny Gets Blue", which became popular when originally recorded by Johnny Mathis with Ray Conniff and His Orchestra, but further collaborations with Levine, including "Where I May Live With My Love", "The Wonder of Wonderful You", "When a Warmhearted Women Loves a Cold-hearted Man" and "Midnight in Manhattan" did not have outstanding success.

== Personal life ==
Danzig was married to Manuel W. Levine (1898-1986), who was the District Attorney for Nassau County, New York from 1959 to 1963, before beginning service as a State Supreme Court justice in Mineola, New York. Evelyn Levine died in 1996 in Los Angeles, California.

== Sources ==
- Claghorn, Charles Eugene. Women Composers and Songwriters. A Concise Biographical Dictionary, Scarecrow Press, 1996.
- Grattan, Virginia L. American Women Songwriters. A Biographical Dictionary, Greenwood Press, 1993.
- Larkin, Colin. The Encyclopedia of Popular Music, 3rd edition, Macmillan, 1998.
