= Little Town (song) =

1982 single by Cliff Richard

Single by Cliff Richard

from the album Now You See Me, Now You Don't
- B-side: "Love and a Helping Hand"; "You, Me and Jesus"
- Released: 15 November 1982
- Recorded: September 1981; January 1982; 25–26 March 82 (Orchestra)
- Studio: Abbey Road; Strawberry Studios
- Genre: Christmas carol
- Length: 4:08
- Label: EMI
- Composer(s): Chris Eaton
- Lyricist(s): Phillips Brooks
- Producer(s): Cliff Richard, Craig Pruess

Cliff Richard singles chronology
"Where Do We Go from Here" (1982)	"Little Town" (1982)	"She Means Nothing to Me" (1983)

"Little Town" is a new arrangement of the traditional Christmas carol "O Little Town of Bethlehem" by English singer-songwriter Chris Eaton. Eaton adapted the lyrics (with some rearrangement of parts of verses) to a new melody he composed in a contemporary Christmas music style. It was first recorded by English singer Cliff Richard and released as a single in the UK for the 1982 Christmas season, reaching number 11 on the UK Singles Chart.

In the US, the better known version is the rendition by renowned CCM artist Amy Grant, who included it on her 1983 album A Christmas Album.

== Cliff Richard original ==
"Little Town" was released in November 1982 as the third single from Richard's 1982 studio album Now You See Me, Now You Don't. It peaked at number 11 for two weeks on the UK Singles Chart over the Christmas week and the following week. The recording featured singer and vocal arranger Tony Rivers and countertenor Nigel Perrin.

=== Personnel ===
As per the album liner notes:

- Cliff Richard – lead vocal, backing vocals
- Tony Rivers – backing vocals, vocal arrangement
- Nigel Perrin – backing vocals, countertenor solo vocal
- Martyn Ford – orchestra conductor
- Craig Pruess – orchestral arrangement, piano, synthesizers, sequencers, electronic percussion, sleigh bells
- Graham Jarvis – drums
- Orchestra:
  - Dave Arnold – Timpani, chimes
  - John Wilbraham – trumpet
  - Crispian Steele-Perkins – trumpet
  - Paul Cosh – trumpet
  - Ted Hobart – trumpet
  - Michael Laird – trumpet
  - Gerry Ruddock – trumpet
  - Mark Emney – trumpet
  - Simon Ferguson – trumpet
  - Jeff Bryant – French horn
  - John Pigneevy – French horn
  - Chris Larkin – French horn
  - John Rooke – French horn
  - Robin Davies – French horn
  - Phillip Eastop – French horn
  - Geoff Perkins – bass trombone
  - Steve Saunders – bass trombone
  - John Iveson – tenor trombone
  - Dave Purser – tenor trombone
  - Michael Hext – tenor trombone
  - David Whitson – tenor trombone
  - Paul Beer – tenor trombone
  - Roger Brenner – tenor trombone
  - Ian Anderson – double bass
  - Michael Brittain – double bass
  - Chris Laurence – double bass

=== Chart performance ===
Chart (1982)	Peak position
Belgium (Ultratop 50 Flanders)	40
Ireland (IRMA)	11
UK Singles (OCC)	11

=== Release ===
The song was first released on 30 August 1982 on Richard's studio album Now You See Me, Now You Don't. The single was released in the UK on the 15 November 1982 in the standard 7-inch vinyl format with picture cover, and also as a 7-inch picture disc variant. On the B-side were "Love and a Helping Hand" and "You, Me and Jesus", except in the US/Canada, where "Be in My Heart" (from the album) was used instead.

In 1988, the song was included on Richard's compilation album Private Collection: 1979–1988 and as an extra B-side on the 12-inch and CD single of his UK Christmas hit "Mistletoe and Wine".

A remixed version of the song with additional instrumentation was included on Richard's 1991 and 2003 Christmas albums Together with Cliff Richard and Cliff at Christmas. The song has also been included on some compilation box sets, The Singles Collection (2002) and ...And They Said it Wouldn't Last (2008).

== Amy Grant version ==
In 1983, CCM artist Amy Grant recorded a slightly more upbeat version of the song on her Christmas album, A Christmas Album.
