= Scarlet Ribbons (For Her Hair) =

1949 popular song

Single by the Browns

from the album Town & Country
- B-side: "Blue Bells Ring"
- Released: 1959
- Genre: Countrypolitan
- Length: 2:35
- Label: RCA Victor
- Composer: Evelyn Danzig
- Lyricist: Jack Segal
- Producer: Chet Atkins

The Browns singles chronology
"The Three Bells" (1959)	"Scarlet Ribbons (For Her Hair)" (1959)	"The Old Lamplighter" (1959)

"Scarlet Ribbons (For Her Hair)" is a popular folk style ballad. The music was written by Evelyn Danzig and the lyrics by Jack Segal. The song has become a standard with many recorded versions, and has appeared on several Christmas albums.

== Background and lyrics ==
"Scarlet Ribbons" was written in only 15 minutes in 1949 at Danzig's home in Port Washington, New York after she invited lyricist Segal to hear her music. The song tells a miraculous tale: the singer (who could be a mother or a father) peeks into his daughter's bedroom to say goodnight and hears the daughter praying for "scarlet ribbons for my hair". It is late, no stores are open in the town, and there is nowhere to obtain any ribbons. The singer's heart "is aching" throughout the night but when at dawn they again peek into the daughter's bedroom they see lovely "scarlet ribbons" in "gay profusion lying there." The singer says that if they live to be two hundred (or, in some versions of the song, a hundred), they will never know from where the ribbons came.

== Selected recordings ==
=== Jo Stafford ===
"Scarlet Ribbons" was first released by Jo Stafford in 1949. In January 1950, Stafford's version reached No. 14 on Billboard's chart of "Records Most Played by Disc Jockeys".

=== Harry Belafonte ===
In 1952 Harry Belafonte, at his third session for RCA Records, covered the song with an arrangement using his guitarist Millard Thomas and male vocal group. The four-year-old recording finally became a success in 1956 after it appeared on his second album, which reached No. 1 on Billboard's album chart for six weeks and stayed on the chart for over a year. The song reached No. 18 on the UK's New Musical Express chart in late 1957.

=== The Kingston Trio ===
The Kingston Trio included their rendition of "Scarlet Ribbons" on their 1959 album At Large.

=== Danny Thomas ===
Danny Thomas sang the song on the The Danny Thomas Show episode "A Locket For Linda".

=== The Browns ===
In 1959, the Browns released what would become the most successful version of "Scarlet Ribbons" in the US. The Browns' version spent 14 weeks on the Billboard Hot 100, reaching No. 13 on January 2, 1960, while reaching No. 7 on Billboard's Hot C&W Sides.

=== Cliff Richard ===
In 1991, Cliff Richard released the song on his Christmas album Together with Cliff Richard, and as a single. The song reached No. 19 on the New Zealand Singles Chart and No. 51 in Germany.

=== Sinéad O'Connor ===
In 1992, Sinéad O'Connor released the song on her third album Am I Not Your Girl? This version failed to gain success in the charts, but was featured in the "Queen of Sheba" episode of The Royle Family, a British television sitcom.
