= O Little Town of Bethlehem =

19th-century Christmas carol by Phillips Brooks

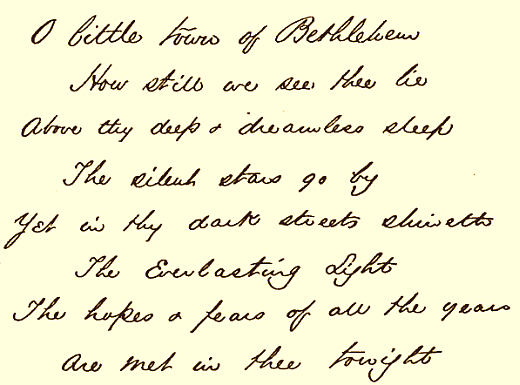
- Author's manuscript of first stanza
- Genre: Christmas carol
- Written: 1868
- Text: Phillips Brooks
- Based on: Micah 5:2
- Meter: 8.6.8.6.7.6.8.6
- Melody: "St. Louis" by Lewis Redner, "Forest Green" by Ralph Vaughan Williams

"O Little Town of Bethlehem" is a Christmas carol. Based on an 1868 text written by Phillips Brooks, the carol is popular on both sides of the Atlantic, but to different tunes: in the United States and Canada, to "St. Louis" by Brooks' collaborator, Lewis Redner; and in the United Kingdom and Ireland to "Forest Green", a tune collected by Ralph Vaughan Williams and first published in the 1906 English Hymnal.

== Words ==
O Little Town of Bethlehem

1. O little town of Bethlehem
How still we see thee lie:
Above thy deep and dreamless sleep
The silent stars go by;
Yet in thy dark streets shineth
The Everlasting Light;
The hopes and fears of all the years
Are met in thee tonight.

2. For Christ is born of Mary,
And gathered all above,
While mortals sleep, the angels keep
Their watch of wondering love.
O morning stars, together
Proclaim the holy birth!
And praises sing to God the King,
And peace to men on earth.

3. How silently, how silently
The wondrous gift is giv'n;
So God imparts to human hearts
The blessing of His heaven;
No ear may hear His coming,
But in this world of sin,
Where meek souls will receive Him still
The dear Christ enters in.

4. Where children pure and happy
Pray to the blessed Child:
Where Misery cries out to Thee,
Son of the undefiled;
Where Charity stands watching,
And Faith holds wide the door,
The dark night wakes, the glory breaks,
And Christmas comes once more.

5. O Holy Child of Bethlehem!
Descend to us, we pray,
Cast out our sin, and enter in,
Be born in us today;
We hear the Christmas angels
The great glad tidings tell;
O come to us, abide with us,
Our Lord Emmanuel!

— Phillips Brooks, Sunday School Service and Hymn Book (NY: E.P. Dutton, 1870).

The text was written by Phillips Brooks (1835–1893), an Episcopal priest, then rector of Church of the Holy Trinity, Philadelphia, and later of Trinity Church, Boston. He was inspired by visiting the village of Bethlehem in the Sanjak of Jerusalem in 1865. Three years later, he wrote the poem for his church, and his organist Lewis Redner (1831–1908) added the music.

The text of the carol was first published in The Sunday School Service and Hymn Book, arranged by the Sunday School Committee of the Diocese of Ohio in five stanzas of eight lines. The original fourth verse is omitted in most hymn and carol books.

== Music ==
=== St. Louis ===
Symphonic arrangement
Seoul Philharmonic Orchestra

Redner's tune, simply titled "St. Louis", is the tune used most often for this carol in the United States. Redner recounted the story of his composition:

As Christmas of 1868 approached, Mr. Brooks told me that he had written a simple little carol for the Christmas Sunday-school service, and he asked me to write the tune to it. The simple music was written in great haste and under great pressure. We were to practice it on the following Sunday. Mr. Brooks came to me on Friday, and said, "Redner, have you ground out that music yet to 'O Little Town of Bethlehem'?" I replied, "No", but that he should have it by Sunday. On the Saturday night previous my brain was all confused about the tune. I thought more about my Sunday-school lesson than I did about the music. But I was roused from sleep late in the night hearing an angel-strain whispering in my ear, and seizing a piece of music paper I jotted down the treble of the tune as we now have it, and on Sunday morning before going to church I filled in the harmony. Neither Mr. Brooks nor I ever thought the carol or the music to it would live beyond that Christmas of 1868.

My recollection is that Richard McCauley, who then had a bookstore on Chestnut Street west of Thirteenth Street, printed it on leaflets for sale. Rev. Dr. Huntington, rector of All Saints' Church, Worcester, Mass., asked permission to print it in his Sunday-school hymn and tune book, called The Church Porch, and it was he who christened the music "Saint Louis".

=== Forest Green ===
MIDI rendition

In the United Kingdom and the Commonwealth, and sometimes in the U.S. (especially in the Episcopal Church), the English hymn tune "Forest Green" is used instead. "Forest Green" was adapted by Ralph Vaughan Williams from an English folk ballad called "The Ploughboy's Dream" which he had collected from a Henry Garman of Forest Green, Surrey in 1903. Garman was born in 1830 in Sussex, and in the 1901 census was living in Ockley, Surrey; Vaughan Williams' manuscript notes he was a "labourer of Forest Green near Ockley – Surrey. ([aged] about 60?)", although Mr Garman would have been nearer 73 when he recited the tune. The tune has a strophic verse structure and is in the form A–A–B–A. Adapted into a hymn tune harmonised by Vaughan Williams, it was first published in the English Hymnal of 1906 (transcribed below).

=== Other versions ===
Two versions also exist by Henry Walford Davies, called "Wengen", or "Christmas Carol". "Wengen" was published in Hymns Ancient and Modern in 1922, meanwhile "Christmas Carol" is usually performed only by choirs rather than as a congregational hymn. This is because the first two verses are for treble voices with organ accompaniment, with only the final verse as a chorale/refrain harmony. This setting includes a recitative from the Gospel of Luke at the beginning, and cuts verses 2 and 4 of the original 5-verse carol. This version is often performed at the service of Nine Lessons and Carols in King's College, Cambridge.

William Rhys-Herbert included a new hymn-tune and harmonization as part of his 1909 cantata, Bethany.

The song has been included in many of the Christmas albums recorded by numerous singers in the modern era.

"Little Town" is an arrangement of "O Little Town of Bethlehem" by English singer-songwriter Chris Eaton. It was first recorded and released by English singer Cliff Richard in 1982 who had a Christmas hit with it in the UK. In the US, the better known version is by American CCM artist Amy Grant, released on her 1983 Christmas album.

== See also ==
- List of Christmas carols
