= Chris Eaton (British musician) =

British singer-songwriter

- Born: Christopher Neville Eaton; 16 September 1958 (age 68); Sedgley, Staffordshire, England
- Genres: Contemporary Christian; pop
- Occupations: Singer; songwriter
- Formerly of: Lyrix; Mark Williamson Band
- Website: chriseaton.co.uk

Christopher Neville Eaton (born 16 September 1958) is a British Contemporary Christian singer-songwriter, who has written songs for singers including Cliff Richard, Amy Grant, Janet Jackson and Jaci Velasquez.

== Career ==
Born in Sedgley, Staffordshire, Eaton was a member of the 1980s bands Lyrix and the Mark Williamson Band prior to his solo career. He has toured the US to promote his albums, and also toured Europe as the opening act for Art Garfunkel in 1998. He worked on Roger Daltrey's 1987 solo album Can't Wait to See the Movie, singing backing vocals.

Eaton wrote Cliff Richard's 1990 UK Christmas No. 1 single "Saviour's Day" and has also written songs that have been performed by other CCM artists such as Amy Grant, who recorded a version of Eaton's "Breath of Heaven". He also wrote several Jaci Velasquez songs including "On My Knees" and "God So Loved" as well as producing two albums.

== Personal life ==
Eaton married singer songwriter Abby Scott in May 2009. He had been previously married, but the marriage ended in 1990.

== Discography ==
=== Albums ===
- 1986: Vision
- 1995: Wonderful World
- 1997: Cruisin' (released in North America as What Kind of Love)
- 2008: Dare to Dream

=== Songs recorded by other artists ===
Eaton has composed many songs recorded by other artists for their albums. Below is a small selection of these:

Cliff Richard

- 1981: Wired for Sound "Lost in a Lonely World" and "Summer Rain"
- 1982: Now You See Me, Now You Don't "Where Do We Go from Here"*, "Little Town"* (rearrangement of "O Little Town of Bethlehem") and "Discovering"
- 1987: Always Guaranteed "Under Your Spell"
- 1989: Stronger "Joanna"
- 1990: From a Distance: The Event "Saviour's Day"* and "All the Time You Need"
- 1991: Together with Cliff Richard "This New Year"
- 2001: Wanted "Let Me Be the One"*
- 2003: Cliff at Christmas "Santa's List"*
- 2004: Something's Goin' On "For Life", "I Don't Wanna Lose You" and "Faithful One"
- 2015: 75 at 75 "Golden"*
- 2018: Rise Up "Reborn"*
- 2020: Music... The Air That I Breathe "Falling for You"*
- 2022: Christmas with Cliff "Six Days After Christmas (Happy New Year)"

Amy Grant

- 1985: Unguarded "Sharayah"
- 1992: Home for Christmas "Breath of Heaven"* and "Emmanuel, God With Us"
- 1991: Heart in Motion "Hats"

Jaci Velasquez

- 1996: Heavenly Place "On My Knees"
- 1998: Jaci Velasquez (self-titled album) "God So Loved"*

Michael English

- 1991: Michael English "Do You Believe in Love"

Russ Taff

- 1985: Medals "Here I Am," "How Much It Hurts" and "Vision"
- 1987: Russ Taff "Believe in Love"

Rachael Lampa

- 2000: Live for You "Live for You"*

Diamond Rio

- 2009: The Reason "Into Your Hands" and "Just Love"

The Imperials

- 1985: Let the Wind Blow "In the Promised Land"
- 1987: This Year's Model "Outlander" and "Warriors"

Military Voices

- 2014: "1914 – The Christmas Truce"* (feat. Abby Scott, Flt Lt Matt Little, the Raf Spitfire Choir & William Inscoe)

Janet Jackson

- 1984: Dream Street "Hold Back the Tears"

Sheena Easton

- 1995: My Cherie "Dance Away the Blues"

Note: *denotes songs released as singles
