= The Only Way Out (Cliff Richard song) =

1982 single by Cliff Richard

Single by Cliff Richard

from the album Now You See Me, Now You Don't
- B-side: "Under the Influence"; "Be In My Heart" (US/Canada)
- Released: 2 July 1982
- Recorded: January 1982
- Genre: Pop rock
- Length: 3:24
- Label: EMI
- Songwriter: Ray Martinez
- Producers: Cliff Richard, Craig Pruess

Cliff Richard singles chronology
"Daddy's Home" (1981)	"The Only Way Out" (1982)	"Where Do We Go from Here" (1982)

Music video
- "The Only Way Out" on YouTube

"The Only Way Out" is a song recorded by English singer Cliff Richard, released in 1982 as the lead-single for his album Now You See Me, Now You Don't. The song was written by British guitarist Ray Martinez. The song reached number 10 in the UK Singles Chart and reached the top 20 in Australia, Belgium, Finland, Ireland, the Netherlands and Switzerland.

== Chart performance ==
=== Weekly charts ===
Chart (1982)	Peak position
Australia (Kent Music Report)	14
Canada RPM Adult Contemporary	3
Denmark (Hitlisten)	28
Belgium (Ultratop 50 Flanders)	6
Germany (GfK)	59
Ireland (IRMA)	10
Finland (IFPI Finland)	20
Netherlands (Single Top 100)	20
New Zealand (Recorded Music NZ)	21
Switzerland (Schweizer Hitparade)	14
UK Singles (Official Charts)	10
US Billboard Hot 100	64
US Adult Contemporary (Billboard)	26
US Cash Box Top 100	69

=== Year-end charts ===
Chart (1982)	Rank
Australia (Kent Music Report)	168
