= Shep and the Limelites =

American musical group (1960–1966)

Shep and the Limelites was an American doo-wop trio of the early 1960s, composed of James "Shep" Sheppard (September 24, 1935 – January 24, 1970), Clarence Bassett (March 13, 1936 – January 25, 2005) and Charles Baskerville (July 6, 1936 – January 18, 1995). They are best known for their 1961 hit recording, "Daddy's Home", co-written by Sheppard, Bassett, and Baskerville.

== Career ==
Sheppard and Bassett, both from Queens, New York, and Baskerville, originally from Virginia, organized a group in Queens in 1960. This was billed initially as Shane Sheppard and the Limelites, but quickly became Shep and the Limelites. All three had previous experience in other groups: Shep with the Heartbeats (notable for "A Thousand Miles Away"); Bassett with the Five Sharps and then, with Baskerville, in the Videos ("Trickle, Trickle" – later covered by the Manhattan Transfer).

Shep & The Limelites' recording sessions for Hull Records started in August 1960. They recorded the original version of "Daddy's Home" on February 1, 1961. "Daddy's Home" reached no. 2 on the Billboard popular music chart in May, and was covered by P. J. Proby (1970) Jermaine Jackson (1972), Toots and the Maytals (Funky Kingston 1973), Junior English, and Cliff Richard (1981). Later songs were not as successful as "Daddy's Home", but still sold well; among these were "What Did Daddy Do", "Ready For Your Love" and "Our Anniversary".

Kahl Music, publisher of "A Thousand Miles Away", an earlier song written by Sheppard, sued Keel Music, publisher of "Daddy's Home", for copyright violation. Keel eventually lost, and this resulted in the end of the Limelites and Hull Records in 1966. Bassett joined the Flamingos and Baskerville joined the Players and then the Drifters. Sheppard re-formed the Limelites in the late 1960s, but was murdered on January 24, 1970. He died in his car on the Long Island Expressway as a result of gunshot injuries sustained during an attempted robbery. Baskerville died, at age 58 on January 18, 1995, in New York. Bassett died on January 25, 2005, at age 68 from the complications of emphysema, at his home in Richmond, Virginia.

James Sheppard's legacy includes the composing of rock 'n' roll's first song cycle. Writing songs for both the Heartbeats and Shep and the Limelites, he tells the story of going home to his girl, with twists along the way, getting married, and celebrating their anniversary. The songs that told this story were "A Thousand Miles Away", "500 Miles to Go", both with the Heartbeats; and then "Daddy's Home", "Three Steps from the Altar", "Our Anniversary", and "What Did Daddy Do?" for Shep and the Limelites.

== Discography ==
=== Singles ===
- "Too Young to Wed" / "Two Loving Hearts" (Apt 45–25039, July 1960)
- "I'm So Lonely (What Can I Do)" / "One Week from Today" (Apt 45–25046, 1961)
- "Daddy's Home" / "This I Know" (Hull 45-H-740, March 1961) – charted at No. 2
- "Ready for Your Love" / "You'll Be Sorry" (Hull 45-H-742, May 1961) – charted at No. 42
- "Three Steps from the Altar" / "Oh, What a Feeling" (Hull 45-H-747, September 1961) - charted at No. 58 on the week ending December 10, 1961
- "Our Anniversary" / "Who Told the Sandman" (Hull 45-H-748, February 1962) - charted at No. 59 on the week ending March 3, 1962
- "What Did Daddy Do" / "Teach Me, Teach Me How to Twist" (Hull 45-H-751, May 1962) - charted at No. 94 on the week ending June 30, 1962.
- "Everything Is Going to Be Alright" / "Gee Baby, What About You" (Hull 45-H-753, August 1962)
- "Remember Baby" / "The Monkey" (Hull 45-H-756, January 1963) - charted at No. 91 on the week ending February 9, 1963.
- "Stick by Me (And I'll Stick By You)" / "It's All Over Now" (Hull 45-H-757, May 1963)
- "Steal Away (With Your Baby" / "For You My Love" (Hull 45-H-759, October 1963)
- "Why, Why, Won't You Believe Me" / "Easy to Remember (When You Want to Forget)" (Hull 45-H-761, November 1963)
- "I'm All Alone" / "Why Did You Fall for Me" (Hull 45-H-767, September 1964)
- "Party for Two" / "You Better Believe" (Hull 45-H-770, 1965)
- "I'm a Hurting Inside / "In Case I Forget" (Hull 45-H-772, September 1965)

=== Albums ===
- Our Anniversary (Hull LP-1001, 1962)
