= The Five Sharps =

Doo-wop group from New York City

- Origin: Queens, New York
- Genres: Doo Wop
- Years active: 1952
- Label: Jubilee
- Past members: Robert Ward; Tom Duckett; Ronald Cuffey; Mickey Owens; Clarence Bassett

The Five Sharps were an American short-lived vocal group from Queens, New York. They are best known today for their recording of "Stormy Weather". "Stormy Weather" is today considered one of the most collectible doo-wop singles ever released. According to the Acoustic Music organization, this version of the song "is one of the rarest of all R&B records. Only three 78rpm and no 45rpm copies are known to exist".

After the group broke up, several of the members went on to join other groups, such as The Videos.

== The recording of "Stormy Weather" ==
In 1952, after months of performing at local functions, The Five Sharps were spotted by a producer and taken into a studio to record two songs. The group recorded their own "Sleepy Cowboy" and the standard "Stormy Weather". The session took most of the day and they were paid in hot dogs and soda pop. First tenor Bobby Ward remembers that sales of "Stormy Weather" were so bad that he and the other members had to buy their own copies, even though they had never been paid for the recording in the first place. The song was released on Jubilee #5104.

== The 78 rpm ==
In late 1961, record collector Billy Pensabene found a 78 rpm copy of the record and brought it to Times Square Records, run by Irving "Slim" Rose. Slim borrowed the record to play on his "Sink Or Swim With Swingin' Slim" radio show on WBNX. While in his care, however, the record was broken. Slim admitted in June 1965 that the record "broke under [his] arm" on the way home from the studio, but at other times he claimed that his pet raccoon, Teddy, had broken the disc by sitting on it.

Slim assured his angry customer that he would replace the broken record. He put up a sign in his store offering $25 in credit for a 78 of the song and $50 for a 45 rpm single. When weeks went by without any takers on his offer, Slim raised the rewards. Slim then went to the owner of Jubilee Records, Jerry Blaine, to get him to reissue the original. He was told that "Stormy Weather" was one of a batch of 80 masters which had been destroyed in a fire.

Since Jubilee, in 1952, had been releasing singles on both the 78 and 45 formats, collectors assumed that there must be a 45 somewhere (even then, collectors valued 45s much more than 78s). None ever surfaced, however, and only a handful of 78's of "Stormy Weather" have ever been found.

== The re-recording ==
In 1964, as the legend of the song grew, Jubilee hired a new group of musicians, under the name of The Five Sharps. They then recorded a new version of "Stormy Weather". It was released as Jubilee 5478, a 45 single. This version is not nearly as collectible as the first version.

== After "Stormy Weather" ==
Cuffey was diagnosed with leukemia and died in 1960. Bassett joined late-period incarnations of both the Drifters and the Flamingos, and later, formed the 1970s band, Creative Funk. Bobby Ward cut one unsuccessful record titled "The Key To The City" in New York in the mid 1960s, but was largely inactive musically. The other members, pianist Tommy Duckett and Mickey Owens, left the music industry until 1975, when four of the surviving group members, including Ward, performed at the Academy of Music in New York.
