= The Picks =

Former Vocal Quartet

- Origin: Texas, United States
- Genres: Lubbock sound
- Years active: 1956–1959, 1969–1974, 1984–1985
- Members: John Pickering; Bill Pickering; Bob Lapham

The Picks was an American vocal quartet that backed Buddy Holly and the Crickets' band on nine of the first twelve Crickets releases on Brunswick in 1957, as well as backing Buddy Holly solos for group sounds. The original members were John Pickering (lead), Bill Pickering (tenor), and Bob Lapham (baritone).

== Biography ==
In 1940, as young members of the Pickering Family Quartet (Mom, Pop, Billy and Johnny), who were singing daily on KICA, Clovis, New Mexico, the two brothers first met Norman Petty and Violet Ann Brady (later, Vi Petty). At the time, Johnny was seven and Billy and Norman were thirteen. Norman Petty, whose piano show followed their radio show, soon became good friends with Billy and Johnny. The family soon moved back and forth between Clovis (KICA), Lubbock (KFYO and KSEL) and Houston (KTRH and KPRC), performing with and meeting many other professional musicians over the years. "Pop" (John M.) Pickering died suddenly in 1953 and Mom (Beth), John and Bill were then joined by radio celebrity Jerry "Jaybird" Drennan as bass-singer for a short time. Soon after the death of "Pop", "Mom" retired from professional singing and Bill and John moved on to perform on their own. They helped form "The Plainsmen" (radio singers and winners of a Horace Heidt competition at Lubbock) but Bill left the group soon after and John joined a radio and TV gospel quartet called "Happy Rhythm Boys". Bill became a disc jockey for KLLL in Lubbock and was the first DJ to play Buddy Holly’s first Decca solo release, "Blue Days, Black Nights".

Later in 1956, Bill returned to Clovis as a KICA DJ and was re-acquainted with old friend Norman Petty at his then new 7th Street Recording Studio in Clovis, New Mexico. Seeing that Norman’s studio was to be known as the best state-of-the-art-studio in New Mexico, Bill soon called his brother John at Lubbock to come to Clovis and do back-up vocals for Norman’s artists. Upon agreeing to this arrangement, John called his friend and fellow Texas Tech student Bob Lapham and the "Picks" trio was formed.

On July 13, 1957, Norman Petty decided to show the Picks a couple of tracks from Buddy Holly, who had recorded them as solos (backed by the instrumental Crickets) at the studio ten days prior. While listening to "Oh, Boy!", everyone agreed that additional vocals were needed only on "Oh, Boy!". Norman quickly suggested that the trio overdub harmony back-up vocals to "Oh Boy" with a "Crickets" sound. The Picks agreed and the second "Crickets" hit, "Oh, Boy!" was soon ready for release on a Brunswick single 45. Due to the success of that song, the Picks' voices were soon added to eight more Buddy Holly lead solo recordings. This resulted in "The Crickets"' versions of "Maybe Baby", "It's Too Late", "Tell Me How", "Rock Me My Baby", "Send Me Some Loving", "An Empty Cup", "Last Night" and "You Got Love". Including "Oh, Boy!", the Picks' nine overdubbed songs were included on the only Crickets' album released while Buddy Holly was alive: The Chirping Crickets (BL 54038; mono 33 1/3 LP; November 27, 1957). The Picks were never credited for their work during Holly's lifetime; it was not until 1987 on an MCA reissue of the original album that they were credited in the USA for their performances.

== Post-Buddy Holly ==
After Buddy’s tragic death in a plane crash, the Picks quietly settled down outside the celebrity lifestyle and Bob Lapham became a successful newspaper editor. John and Bill (The Pickering Brothers) regrouped at Houston in 1969–1970 and released Nashville-recorded turntable hits for Pete Drake's Stop Records. Some of the six national Pickering Brothers' releases were "Proud Mary", "Words", "Going Down to the River" and their own version of "Oh, Boy!". Some of the Buddy Holly and The Picks albums also contain the Picks' versions of "Words" and "You've Lost That Lovin' Feeling" from those sessions at Nashville, as well as Houston-recorded Buddy Holly Tributes written by John Pickering, entitled "Buddy Holly Not Fade Away" and "Forever 22". In 1971, the Pickering Brothers were managed and produced on the Daffan Record label in Houston by Songwriter Hall-of-Famer Ted Daffan, writer of "Born to Lose", "Worried Mind", and many other monster hit songs. Unfortunately, the Pickering Brothers' career as a duet came to an abrupt stop on October 8, 1973, when Bill Pickering suffered a near-fatal brain aneurysm. John Pickering, however, continued as a solo artist, releasing on Pick Records the "Picks 25th Anniversary" cassette tape for fan clubs. At first comatose, blind, and unable to sing for a long time afterwards, Bill Pickering survived, regained his vision, and recovered his high tenor voice prior to 1984.

== A comeback ==
In 1984, John and Bill met with Maria Elena Holly at Lubbock and told her about their desire to overdub more Buddy Holly solos, and she agreed. Buddy's original solo masters were sent to Houston for the purpose, and many more latter-day overdubs were completed by the Picks, beginning in 1984. Bill Pickering died on January 25, 1985, and at his request shortly before his death, the first Buddy Holly and the Picks (1986) album was released, although it happened more than a year after his death.

In 1987, John Pickering and his wife Vicky helped Vi Petty plan and organize the first Clovis Music Festival at Clovis, New Mexico, while John was recording 30 songs over a period of three months at Norman Petty's downtown twenty-four track Mesa Theater Recording Studio. John still wrote songs and solos, occasionally providing all three parts of back-up harmonies for other artists at Houston, Texas.

John Pickering was finishing a book about the Pickering Family Quartet, the Picks, the Pickering Brothers, and their musical careers.

Bob Lapham is an author with several books to his credit, including a novel (fiction with some facts) called Meet Me at the River Buddy Holly. He was a retired newspaper editor living in Abilene, Texas. He occasionally did some back-up singing produced by his son, John Mark Lapham, who has had a long association with England's musical group The Earlies.

Longtime members of the internet Rockabilly Hall of Fame, the original three Picks (John Pickering, the late Bill Pickering, and Bob Lapham) were inducted into the New Mexico Music Hall of Fame at Albuquerque, New Mexico on November 10, 2007. On February 23, 2009, a resolution was read into the Texas State Senate honoring the Picks for over 50 years of artistic contributions to the state. In 2006, the West Texas Music Hall of Fame presented the Picks the Pioneer Award.

=== The Picks' overdubs ===
In February 1984, Steve Hoffman, an employee of MCA sent what are known as safety copies of several Buddy Holly master recordings to John Pickering of the Picks who took them to Sound Masters studios in Houston, Texas. There, the reunited group overdubbed their new vocal parts onto at least 60 recordings, and sent them back. The general consensus seems to be that MCA might have issued these "new" recordings as an album. This however, was not to be.

With these plans having fallen through, Pickering decided to take matters into his own hands and release them himself.

These recordings slowly made their way to the public on privately pressed albums like The Original Chirping Sound and Buddy Holly Not Fade Away. In 1992, Pickering approached Viceroy Records to arrange a deal for major nationwide distribution of these overdubbed recordings. He hit a brick wall when MCA made it clear that Pickering did not have proper legal clearance to release such recordings. Andy McKaie, an MCA executive, has stated that Pickering has never bothered to ask for licensing on the songs. Given the reported volume of sales of such albums it may seem surprising that MCA chose not to take legal action to stop the unauthorised use of their masters. To this day, many budget labels release these recordings, again without authorisation from MCA. Such albums often masquerade as 'Buddy Holly Greatest Hits' and some buyers seem to have been unaware that they are not the original versions. There has been much criticism in such Rock'n'Roll magazines as Holly International and Now Dig This, and online, from Buddy Holly fans who regard the Picks intrusion on classic Holly recordings as 'like painting a moustache on the Mona Lisa'.

== Death ==
Billy Duane Pickering died January 25, 1985, at age 57.

John Winton Pickering died on February 28, 2011, in Houston, Texas, following complications after a stroke, aged 77.

Bob Lapham died April 4, 2018, at age 83 in Abilene, TX.
