= The Best of Cliff Vol. 2 =

Compilation album by Cliff Richard
- Released: 1972
- Label: Columbia

Professional ratings
Review scores
Source	Rating
AllMusic	2/5 stars

The Best of Cliff Vol. 2 is a compilation album by Cliff Richard released in 1972 on Columbia Records.

== Track listing ==
Side 1
No.	Title	Length
1.	"Goodbye Sam, Hello Samantha"
2.	"Marianne"
3.	"Throw Down a Line"
4.	"Jesus"
5.	"Sunny Honey Girl"
6.	"I Ain't Got Time Anymore"
7.	"Flying Machine"

Side 2
No.	Title	Length
1.	"Sing a Song of Freedom"
2.	"With the Eyes of a Child"
3.	"Good Times (Better Times)"
4.	"I'll Love You Forever Today"
5.	"The Joy of Living"
6.	"Silvery Rain"
7.	"Big Ship"

== Charts ==
Chart (1972)	Peak position
UK Albums (OCC)	49
