= Flying Machine (song) =

1971 single by Cliff Richard

- Cover of the single released in Germany

Single by Cliff Richard
- B-side: "Pigeon"
- Released: 25 June 1971
- Recorded: 20 March 1971
- Studio: EMI Studios, London
- Genre: Pop rock
- Length: 3:02
- Label: Columbia
- Songwriter(s): Georg Hultgreen
- Producer(s): Norrie Paramor

Cliff Richard singles chronology
"Silvery Rain" (1971)	"Flying Machine" (1971)	"Sing a Song of Freedom" (1971)

"Flying Machine" is a song by British singer Cliff Richard, released as a single in June 1971. It peaked at number 37 on the UK Singles Chart, becoming Richard's first UK single to not make the Top 30.

== Release ==
"Flying Machine" was written by Norwegian musician Georg Kajanus (then known as Georg Hultgreen), who had been a member of folk rock band Eclection and who would go on to be the lead singer of Sailor. He recorded a demo version on acetate, which Richard listened to and recorded his version in March 1971. It was arranged by and features the orchestra of Norrie Paramor. Hultgreen also features on Richard's version playing the flute. It was released as a single with the B-side "Pigeon", which was written by Guy Fletcher and Doug Flett and features the Nick Ingman Orchestra.

Hultgreen recorded his own proper version in 1972 as part of Kajanus Pickett (with Phil Pickett), which was released on their sole album Hi Ho SIlver!. His original demo version was later released on the 2006 album Kajanus (Revealed).

== Track listing ==
7": Columbia / DB 8797

1. "Flying Machine" – 3:02
2. "Pigeon" – 2:45

== Personnel ==
- Cliff Richard – vocals
- Georg Hultgreen – flute
- Big Jim Sullivan – guitar
- Norrie Paramor Orchestra – all other instrumentation

== Charts ==
Chart (1971)	Peak position
Denmark (IFPI)	4
Germany (GfK)	35
Malaysia (Rediffusion)	1
UK Singles (OCC)	37
