= Minx (Toyah Willcox album) =

Studio album by Toyah
- Released: 22 July 1985
- Recorded: 1985
- Studios: Audio International Studios, London
- Genres: New wave; pop
- Length: 40:08
- Label: Portrait
- Producer: Christopher Neil

Toyah chronology
Mayhem (1985)	Minx (1985)	Desire (1987)

Singles from Minx
- 1. "Don't Fall in Love (I Said)" Released: April 1985; 2. "Soul Passing Through Soul" Released: June 1985; 3. "World in Action" Released: September 1985

Minx is the first solo album by English singer Toyah Willcox, released in 1985 by Portrait Records. It spawned the moderate hit "Don't Fall in Love (I Said)".

== Background ==
Although still credited simply as "Toyah" (which was the name of the band she fronted up until 1984), the album was technically the start of Willcox's career as a solo artist, and her first LP for a major label, Portrait Records (part of the CBS group) after she left the independent label Safari which had released all of her music up until then. Minx was to be Toyah's only album for Portrait.

The album represented a departure from her previous works, which tended toward thematic albums written almost in their entirety by Willcox and long-standing band members such as Joel Bogen and Phil Spalding. As an attempt to make a more "polished" pop album and supposedly to break into the U.S. market, a lot of artistic control was ceded to the producers leading to an unprecedented four cover versions from the original CD's 12 tracks. The material was produced by Christopher Neil.

The cover photograph was taken by Terence Donovan, showing Willcox wearing outfits designed by Japanese avant-garde fashion designer Issey Miyake. She wore a number of Miyake's garments during this period, which were used in photoshoots and subsequent artworks.

The lead single "Don't Fall in Love (I Said)" was a hit in the UK and Ireland, reaching the top 40, but follow-up releases "Soul Passing Through Soul" and "World in Action" were less successful. Minx debuted and peaked at number 24 in the UK and was Toyah's only entry on the pan-European albums chart (at number 81). It was particularly popular in Israel.

The album, which was out of print by the 1990s, was reissued in 2005 with bonus tracks. In 2020, it was released as part of the Toyah Solo box set and subsequently reissued on red vinyl. The album was re-released again in 2024, as a 2-CD set.

== Track listing ==
Side one
No.	Title	Writer(s)	Length
1.	"Soldier of Fortune, Terrorist of Love"	Toyah Willcox, Adrian Lee	3:10
2.	"Don't Fall in Love (I Said)"	Willcox, Simon Darlow	3:45
3.	"Soul Passing Through Soul"	Willcox, Michael St James	3:52
4.	"Sympathy" (Rare Bird cover)	Graham Standfield, David Kassinetti, Stephen Gould, Mark Ashton	3:28
5.	"I'll Serve You Well"	Willcox, Darlow	5:57

Side two
No.	Title	Writer(s)	Length
6.	"All in a Rage"	Willcox, Joel Bogen	3:28
7.	"Space Between the Sounds"	Willcox, Darlow	4:32
8.	"School's Out" (Alice Cooper cover)	Alice Cooper, Michael Bruce	3:56
9.	"World in Action"	Harry Bogdanovs	3:36
10.	"America for Beginners" (Latin Quarter cover)	Steve Skaith, Mike Jones	4:24

Original CD/cassette bonus tracks
No.	Title	Writer(s)	Length
6.	"Over Twenty-One" (DATA cover)	Georg Kajanus	3:17
12.	"Vigilante"	Bogdanovs	3:23
Total length:			46:48

2005 CD additional bonus tracks
No.	Title	Writer(s)	Length
13.	"Snow Covers the Kiss"	Willcox, Bogen, Christopher Neil	3:13
14.	"Kiss the Devil"	Willcox, Lee	3:21
15.	"Don't Fall in Love (I Said)" (Extended Mix)	Willcox, Darlow	5:12
16.	"Soul Passing Through Soul" (Extended Mix)	Willcox, St James	4:45
17.	"World in Action" (Extended Mix)	Bogdanovs	5:39
18.	"World in Action" (Action Mix)	Bogdanovs	9:23
Total length:			78:21

== Personnel ==
- Toyah Willcox – lead and backing vocals
- Ian Wherry, Simon Darlow – keyboards
- Al Hodge – guitar
- Peter Van Hooke – drums
- Frank Ricotti – percussion
- Alan Carvell, Chris Neil, Lorna Wright, Linda Taylor – backing vocals

Guest musicians

- Adrian Lee – keyboards on track 1
- Andy Brown – bass on track 3 and 16
- John Earle, Ray Beavis – saxophones on track 3 and 16
- Michael St James – backing vocals on track 3
- Richard Hewson – string arrangements on track 4
- Joji Hirota – percussion on track 5
- Phil Palmer – guitar on track 6
- The English Chorale – additional vocals on track 7
- Paul Raven – bass on track 8
- Paul Ferguson – drums on track 8
- Richard Bull – guitar on tracks 9, 17 and 18
- John Kirby – backing vocals on track 10
- Jon McLoughlin – additional guitar on track 18

Production

- Christopher Neil – producer
- Simon Hurrell – engineer

== Charts ==
Chart (1985)	Peak position
European Albums (Music & Media)	81
UK Albums (Official Charts Company)	24

Chart (2020)	Peak position
UK Vinyl Albums	33

Chart (2024)	Peak position
Scottish Albums	80
UK Physical Albums (Official Charts Company)	32
UK Independent Albums	7
