= Wonderful World (Cliff Richard song) =

1968 song by Cliff Richard

- Cover of the single released in Belgium

Single by Cliff Richard

from the EP Congratulations: Cliff Sings 6 Songs for Europe
- B-side: "I'll Love You Forever Today"
- Released: August 1968
- Recorded: 2 February 1968
- Studio: EMI Studios, London
- Genre: Pop
- Length: 2:35
- Label: Columbia
- Songwriter(s): Guy Fletcher; Doug Flett
- Producer(s): Norrie Paramor

Cliff Richard singles chronology
"I'll Love You Forever Today" (1968)	"Wonderful World" (1968)	"Marianne" (1968)

"Wonderful World" is a song written by Guy Fletcher and Doug Flett and first recorded and released by British singer Cliff Richard.

== Recording and release ==
"Wonderful World" was recorded by Richard as a potential song for the Eurovision Song Contest 1968. It was first performed on 5 March 1968 on A Song for Europe, the UK national selection television programme for the Contest. The song came third in the vote, losing out to "Congratulations" and "High 'n' Dry". "Congratulations" backed with "High 'n' Dry" was then released as a single in March 1968. "Wonderful World" was first released in May 1968 on the EP Congratulations: Cliff Sings 6 Songs for Europe, which included all six shortlisted songs sung by Richard for the Eurovision national selection process.

"Wonderful World" was only released as a single in Belgium and Japan. It was first released in Belgium in August 1968 with the B-side "I'll Love You Forever Today", which had been released as a single in the UK. It was released in Japan several months later with the B-side "Little Rag Doll", written by Mike Leander, and which was also recorded as a potential Eurovision song. "Wonderful World" was also released as the B-side to the French release of "I'll Love You Forever Tomorrow".

Richard also recorded a German-language version in October 1968, also titled "Wonderful World" (the song features the lyrics "Wonderful World", but the rest are in German). It was released in March 1969 as the B-side to "Zärtliche Sekunden", the German-language version of "Don't Forget to Catch Me".

== Track listing ==
7": Columbia / DCB 121 (Belgium)

1. "Wonderful World" – 2:35
2. "I'll Love You Forever Today" – 3:02

7": Odeon / OR-2110 (Japan)

1. "Wonderful World" – 2:35
2. "Little Rag Doll" – 2:15

== Personnel ==
- Cliff Richard – vocals
- John Paul Jones – bass guitar
- Bernard Ebbinghouse Orchestra – all other instrumentation
- Mike Sammes Singers – backing vocals

== Charts ==
Chart (1968)	Peak position
Belgium (Ultratop 50 Flanders)	20

== Elvis Presley version ==
"Wonderful World"

Song by Elvis Presley
- Recorded: March 7, 1968
- Studio: Western Recorders Studio 1, Hollywood, California
- Genre: Pop
- Length: 2:14
- Songwriter(s): Guy Fletcher; Doug Flett
- Producer(s): Billy Strange

"Wonderful World" was recorded by Elvis Presley in March 1968 for the film Live a Little, Love a Little, in which Presley also starred and which was released in October 1968. It was not released as a single and no soundtrack album or EP was released to promote the film. However, Presley's version of "Wonderful World" was released at the beginning of October (several weeks before the film's release) on the budget compilation album Singer Presents Elvis Singing Flaming Star and Others, which was a promotional release only available at certain stores. This album was given a full release in March 1969 under the title Elvis Sings Flaming Star.

"Wonderful World" became the first song by British writers to be recorded by Presley. However, the lyrics on Presley's version are completely different to the original version as Fletcher and Flett were asked to rewrite them for the film. After Presley recorded the song, Fletcher and Flett were asked to write another song for Presley. They wrote "The Fair's Moving On", which was released as the B-side to "Clean Up Your Own Backyard".
