= Trouble (Sailor album) =

Studio album by Sailor
- Released: 1975
- Recorded: October 1975
- Studio: CBS Studios, London
- Genre: Glam rock, pop rock
- Length: 29:25
- Label: Epic
- Producer: Jeffrey Lesser

Sailor chronology
Sailor (1974)	Trouble (1975)	The Third Step (1976)

Singles from Trouble
- 1. "A Glass of Champagne" Released: 7 November 1975; 2. "Girls, Girls, Girls" Released: 5 Mar 1976

Trouble is the second album by the British pop group Sailor, formed in 1973 and best known in the 1970s for their hit singles "A Glass of Champagne" and "Girls, Girls, Girls" (both featured on this album), written by the group's Norwegian lead singer and 12-string guitar player, Georg Kajanus. The album reached #45 in the UK charts.

== Track listing ==
All words and music by Georg Kajanus

Side 1

1. "Girls, Girls, Girls" – 3:02
2. "Trouble in Hong Kong" – 3:07
3. "People in Love" – 3:29
4. "Coconut" – 2:24
5. "Jacaranda" – 2:15

Side 2

1. "A Glass of Champagne" – 2:41
2. "My Kind of Girl" – 3:01
3. "Panama" – 3:25
4. "Stop That Man" – 3:05
5. "The Old Nickelodeon Sound" – 2:56

== Personnel ==
Sailor

- Grant Serpell - drums, percussion, vocals
- Phil Pickett - bass nickelodeon, guitarron, piano, vocals
- Henry Marsh - nickelodeon, accordion, piano, marimbas, vocals
- Georg Kajanus - 12-string guitars, charango, Veracruzana harp, lead vocals

== Production ==
- Produced by: Jeffrey Lesser
- Associate Producer: Rupert Holmes
- Recorded at: CBS Studios, London (October 1975)
- Mastering Engineer: Arun Chakraverty
- Album Design: Roslav Szaybo (CBS Records)
- Photography: Peter Lavery

== Charts ==
=== Weekly charts ===
Chart (1974–76)	Peak position
Australian Albums (Kent Music Report)	17
Austrian Albums (Ö3 Austria)	5
Dutch Albums (Album Top 100)	4
Finnish Albums (Suomen virallinen lista)	2
German Albums (Offizielle Top 100)	3
Norwegian Albums (VG-lista)	18
Swedish Albums (Sverigetopplistan)	25
UK Albums (Official Charts)	45

=== Year-end charts ===
Chart (1976)	Position
German Albums (Offizielle Top 100)	10
