= Girl, You'll Be a Woman Soon =

1967 single by Neil Diamond

Single by Neil Diamond

from the album Just for You
- B-side: "You'll Forget" (US, UK); "New Orleans" (continental Europe)
- Released: March 1967
- Recorded: 1966
- Genre: Folk rock; pop rock
- Length: 2:48
- Label: Bang
- Songwriter: Neil Diamond
- Producers: Jeff Barry, Ellie Greenwich

Neil Diamond singles chronology
"You Got to Me" (1967)	"Girl, You'll Be a Woman Soon" (1967)	"Thank the Lord for the Night Time" (1967)

"Girl, You'll Be a Woman Soon" is a song written by American musician Neil Diamond, whose recording of it on Bang Records reached number 10 on the US pop singles chart in 1967. The song enjoyed a second life when it appeared on the 1994 Pulp Fiction soundtrack, performed by rock band Urge Overkill. Other versions have been recorded by Cliff Richard (1968), Jackie Edwards (1968), the Biddu Orchestra (1978), and 16 Volt (1998).

== Neil Diamond version ==
The song first appeared on Diamond's album Just for You. The mono and stereo versions of this song differ slightly. On the mono "Just For You" LP as well as on the 45, the strings do not come in until the second verse. It also has a slightly longer fade. The stereo "Just For You" LP version has a shorter fade and the strings come in on the first chorus. The lyrics describe a narrator romantically interested in a young woman whose friends and family disapprove of him ("They never get tired of putting me down") while he urges the woman to reach her own conclusions about him ("Don't let them make up your mind").

Billboard described the single as a "sure-fire chart topper," stating that an "easy rhythm backs a soulful reading of a compelling lyric." Cash Box called the single a "rhythmic, mid-tempo ballad that should see lots of Top 40 play."

=== Track listing ===
7-inch single

1. "Girl, You'll Be a Woman Soon"
2. "You'll Forget"

=== Charts ===
Chart (1967)	Peak position
US Billboard Pop Singles	10
Chart (1971)	Peak position
Dutch Mega Top 100	27

== Certifications ==
Region	Certification	Certified units/sales
New Zealand (RMNZ)	Gold	15,000^{‡}
^{‡} Sales+streaming figures based on certification alone.

== Cliff Richard version ==
"Girl You'll Be a Woman Soon"

Single by Cliff Richard
- A-side: "I'll Love You Forever Today"
- Released: June 21, 1968
- Recorded: February 11, 1968
- Studio: EMI Studios, London
- Genre: Pop
- Length: 3:03
- Label: Columbia
- Songwriter: Neil Diamond
- Producer: Norrie Paramor

Cliff Richard singles chronology
"Congratulations" (1968)	"Girl You'll Be a Woman Soon" (1968)	"Marianne" (1968)

Cliff Richard covered the song as the B-side to his 1968 single "I'll Love You Forever Today", which was featured in the movie Two a Penny.

=== Track listing ===
7-inch single

1. "I'll Love You Forever Today" – 3:06
2. "Girl, You'll Be a Woman Soon" – 3:03

=== Charts ===
Chart (1968)	Peak position
UK Singles Chart	27

== Urge Overkill version ==
"Girl, You'll Be a Woman Soon"

Single by Urge Overkill

from the album Stull (EP) and Pulp Fiction
- B-side: "Bustin' Surfboards"
- Released: 1994
- Length: 3:10
- Label: MCA
- Songwriter: Neil Diamond
- Producers: Urge Overkill, Kramer

Urge Overkill singles chronology
"Positive Bleeding" (1993)	"Girl, You'll Be a Woman Soon" (1994)	"The Break" (1995)

Music video
- "Girl, You'll Be a Woman Soon" on YouTube

American alternative rock band Urge Overkill recorded a cover of the song for their second extended play (EP), Stull (1992). This version would later appear in Quentin Tarantino's 1994 film Pulp Fiction. Issued as a single in late 1994, this version achieved some chart success both domestically and internationally, peaking at number one in Iceland and reaching the top 20 in Flanders, France, and New Zealand. On the US Billboard Modern Rock Tracks chart, the song peaked at number 11.

=== Track listing ===
CD single

1. "Girl, You'll Be a Woman Soon" – 3:10
2. "Bustin' Surfboards" (by the Tornadoes) – 2:27
3. "Bullwinkle Part II" (by the Centurians) – 2:18

=== Charts ===
Chart (1994–1995)	Peak position
Australia (ARIA)	21
Austria (Ö3 Austria Top 40)	22
Belgium (Ultratop 50 Flanders)	10
Belgium (Ultratop 50 Wallonia)	29
Europe (Eurochart Hot 100)	65
France (SNEP)	10
Iceland (Íslenski Listinn Topp 40)	1
New Zealand (Recorded Music NZ)	19
Scotland Singles (OCC)	28
UK Singles (OCC)	37
US Billboard Hot 100	59
US Modern Rock Tracks (Billboard)	11

=== Certifications ===
Region	Certification	Certified units/sales
United Kingdom (BPI)	Silver	200,000^{‡}
^{‡} Sales+streaming figures based on certification alone.

=== Release history ===
Region	Date	Format(s)	Label(s)	Ref.
United States	1994	Cassette	MCA	
United Kingdom	November 7, 1994	CD; cassette	MCA	
