= Early in the Morning (Vanity Fare song) =

1969 single by Vanity Fare

Single by Vanity Fare

from the album Early in the Morning
- B-side: "You Made Me Love You"
- Released: 20 June 1969
- Recorded: 1969
- Genre: Sunshine pop; pop rock
- Length: 2:52
- Label: Page One
- Songwriters: Mike Leander; Eddie Seago
- Producers: Des Champ; Roger Easterby

Vanity Fare singles chronology
"Highway of Dreams" (1969)	"Early in the Morning" (1969)	"Hitchin' a Ride" (1969)

"Early in the Morning" is a song by British band Vanity Fare, released as a single in June 1969. It became an international hit and was awarded a gold disc for sales over one million. The song reached number 8 on the UK Singles Chart. In the US it peaked at number 12 on the Billboard Hot 100 the week of 31 January 1970, number 10 on Cash Box and number 4 on the Easy Listening chart. In Canada it reached number 10 on RPM magazine's RPM100 chart and number 4 on the RPM Adult chart. In the Dutch Top 40, the single reached number 33.

== Release and reception ==
"Early in the Morning" was the first song to be written by Mike Leander and Eddie Seago together. It was released with the B-side "You Made Me Love You", written by Vanity Fare's Barry Landeman. It was a non-album single in the UK and Europe, but was included on the North American and Australasian album Early in the Morning. Despite its release in June, "Early in the Morning" did not enter the UK Single Chart until the week of 23 July, reaching it peak three weeks later.

Reviewing for New Musical Express, Derek Johnson wrote: "Take an invigorating gypsy hora dance, and slow it down to mid-tempo – and you'll get some idea of the rhythmic feel of this sparkling item. It's catchy and hummable, with an air of suppressed vitality and carefree abandon. Jogs along merrily and features an attractive vocal blend from Vanity Fare, while the acoustic guitars and clavioline emphasise the Balkan quality. Very easy listening, and a song that's very easy to assimilate".

== Charts ==
Chart (1969–70)	Peak position
Australia (Go-Set)	18
Australia (Kent Music Report)	25
Canada Top Singles (RPM)	10
Canada Adult Contemporary (RPM)	4
Finland (Suomen virallinen lista)	18
Germany (GfK)	26
Ireland (IRMA)	15
Japan (Oricon Singles Chart)	51
Malaysia (Radio Malaysia)	1
Netherlands (Dutch Top 40)	33
Netherlands (Single Top 100)	28
New Zealand (Listener)	14
Rhodesia (Lyons Maid)	6
Switzerland (Schweizer Hitparade)	6
UK Singles (Official Charts)	8
US Billboard Hot 100	12
US Easy Listening (Billboard)	4
US Cash Box Top 100	10
US Record World 100 Top Pops	9

== Cliff Richard version ==
"Early in the Morning"

Single by Cliff Richard

from the album Tracks 'n Grooves
- B-side: "Ooh La La" (Japan); "Take Action" (Australia)
- Released: 15 August 1969
- Recorded: 2 May 1969
- Studio: EMI Studios, London
- Genre: Pop rock
- Length: 2:16
- Label: Columbia; Odeon (Japan)
- Songwriters: Mike Leander; Eddie Seago
- Producer: Norrie Paramor

Cliff Richard singles chronology
"Big Ship" (1969)	"Early in the Morning" (1969)	"Throw Down a Line" (1969)

Richard recorded two different songs both titled "Early in the Morning". The first was "Early in the Morning", written by Bobby Darin and Woody Harris, in 1958 for the album Jack Good's Oh Boy!. In May 1969, Cliff Richard recorded a second one, which was a cover of "Early in the Morning" by Vanity Fare, arranged by and featuring the orchestra of Mike Vickers. It was released as a single in various countries, becoming most successful in Japan, where it peaked at number 4 on the Oricon Singles Chart. After its success in Japan, the song was added as the lead track to the Japanese release of Richard's fifteenth studio album Sincerely, released there in December 1969. Elsewhere, it was included on Richard's following studio album Tracks 'n Grooves, released in November 1970.

=== Release ===
"Early in the Morning" was first released as a single in the Netherlands in August 1969, with the B-side "Shout", a cover of the Isley Brothers song and taken from Richard's album Don't Stop Me Now!. Although it reached the "bubbling under" chart in September 1969, it didn't reach the Top 40. It was released in Australia and New Zealand in September with the B-sides "Take Action", from the album Sincerely, and "Twist and Shout", from Two a Penny, respectively. It was also released in Japan in September with the B-side "Ooh La La" from the album Established 1958. "Early in the Morning" was also released as a single in France, Italy and Spain with the B-sides "Baby I Could Be So Good at Loving You", "I Get the Feelin'" and "Someday (You'll Want Me to Want You)", respectively. It was also released in South Africa and Rhodesia with the B-side "Rattler".

Richard has said that he was "amazed" that his version was successful in Japan, "because I know that Vanity Fair [sic] had made by far the superior record, because I'm a sucker for vocal harmonies and things. And I hadn't really used harmonies too much on my version. But we sold about half a million copies over there and in fact, Vanity Fair [sic] didn't get a sale in Japan. And whenever I see them, I feel quite embarrassed". Vanity Fare's version did actually get a release in Japan, selling over 23,000 copies and peaking at number 51 on the Oricon Singles Chart.

=== Track listings ===
7" (Netherlands)

1. "Early in the Morning" – 2:16
2. "Shout" – 3:24

7" (Australia)

1. "Early in the Morning" – 2:16
2. "Take Action" – 2:08

7" (New Zealand)

1. "Early in the Morning" – 2:16
2. "Twist and Shout" – 2:38

7" (Japan)

1. "Early in the Morning" – 2:14
2. "Ooh La La" – 2:52

7" (France)

1. "Early in the Morning" – 2:16
2. "Baby I Could Be So Good at Loving You" – 3:09

7" (Italy)

1. "Early in the Morning" – 2:16
2. "I Get the Feelin'" – 2:17

7" (Spain)

1. "Early in the Morning" – 2:16
2. "Someday (You'll Want Me to Want You)" – 2:21

7" (South Africa and Rhodesia)

1. "Early in the Morning" – 2:16
2. "Rattler" – 2:47

=== Charts ===
==== Weekly charts ====
Chart (1969–70)	Peak position
Australia (Kent Music Report)	55
Netherlands (Dutch Top 40 Tipparade)	2
Japan (Oricon Singles Chart)	4
Japan International (Oricon)	1
Rhodesia (Lyons Maid)	10

==== Year-end charts ====
Chart (1969)	Peak position
Japan Foreign Hits	15

Chart (1970)	Peak position
Japan Foreign Hits	13
