= Rogue (band) =

British band (1975–1979)

- Origin: England
- Genres: Soft rock
- Years active: 1975–1979
- Labels: Epic Records, Ariola
- Members: Guy Fletcher; Al Hodge; John Hodkinson

Rogue were a British soft rock band who were active between 1975 and 1979, comprising Guy Fletcher, Al Hodge and John Hodkinson. The group's original material was all written by Fletcher and his songwriting partner Doug Flett, though Flett was never a member of the band.

== Band history ==
In 1975, Fletcher, former Onyx guitarist Hodge, and former If-vocalist Hodkinson formed the soft-rock trio Rogue which released several singles, including "Dedication", "Cool Clear Air", "Lay Me Down", "Lady Put the Light Out", "Too Much Too Soon", "One to One", and "Borderline", as well as three albums. Their song "Fallen Angel" was a No. 12 hit in the Netherlands in January 1976 and narrowly missed the Billboard Hot 100, charting at No. 8 on the Bubbling Under Hot 100 chart.

The group disbanded in 1979.

== Album discography ==
- Fallen Angels (Epic 69235, 1975)
- Let It Go (Epic 81987, 1977)
- Would You Let Your Daughter (Ariola 5028, 1979)

== Covers ==
The band also produced a version of "Dedication" for London's Capital Radio, with the first line: "Capital's our local station."

Their song "Dedication" was covered by the Bay City Rollers on their 1976 album Dedication. Released as a single in the US, it reached No. 60 on the Billboard Hot 100. Frankie Valli's recording of their song "Fallen Angel" reached No. 11 on the UK Singles Chart in May 1976, before being featured in the Broadway show Jersey Boys.
