= Grant Serpell =

British drummer (born 1944)

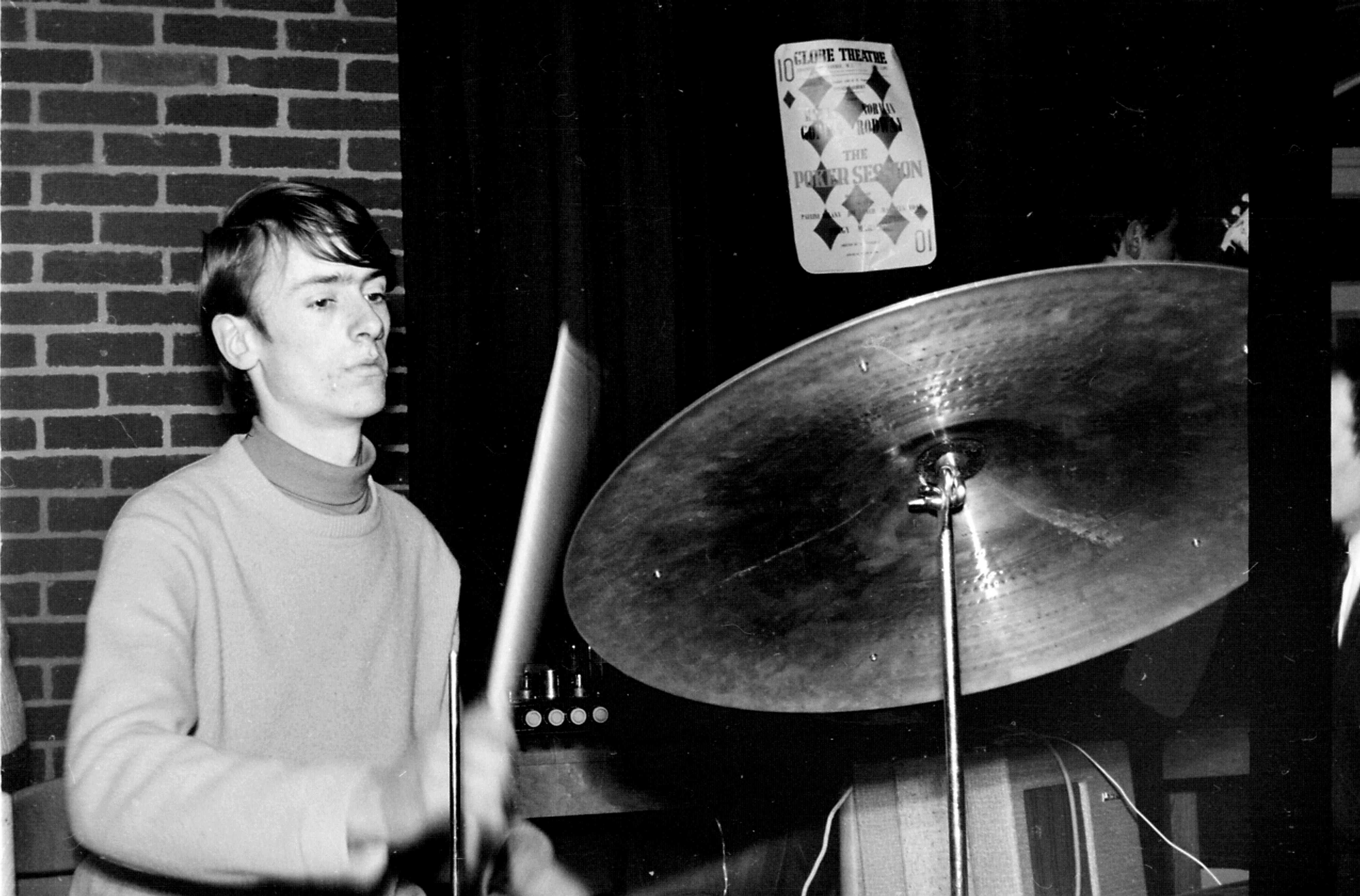
- Serpell in the 1960s

Background information
- Born: Stephen Grant Serpell; 9 February 1944 (age 82); Maidenhead, Berkshire, England
- Genres: Pop music
- Occupations: Musician, teacher
- Instruments: Drums, percussion, vocals
- Years active: 1968–1979, 1990–2011

Stephen Grant Serpell (born 9 February 1944) is a British drummer. He was a member of several bands during the 1960s and 1970s, including Affinity and Sailor.

== Early life ==
Serpell was born in Maidenhead to a farmer from Cornwall and an office clerk. He originally took violin lessons but after a drummer called Ray Cobb stayed the night at their house, he switched to drums. He formed his first band at Grammar school. He then studied for a degree in Chemistry from the University of Sussex.

== Career ==
While at university, Serpell founded The Jazz Quartet, and he played with the University of Sussex Jazz Trio (known as The U.S. Jazz Trio).

Serpell joined Affinity in 1965 while still in University, but when he graduated a year later, he was replaced. In 1968, the group reformed after a years break and rehired Serpell again. He played on their first and only album, Affinity. They split up in 1972 but reformed for a reunion in 2006 and 2011, both of which Serpell attended. In 1973, Serpell formed Sailor with Georg Kajanus, Phil Pickett and Henry Marsh. In 1975, they recorded "A Glass of Champagne", which went to number 2 in the UK.

In 1983, during Sailor's quieter times, Serpell became a chemistry teacher, first at Altwood Church of England School and then at Waingels Copse Comprehensive School (now Waingels College), where he became head of the department and then became director of studies at a sixth form. While at Waingels College he taught Irwin Sparkes of The Hoosiers and, after hearing a demo from Sparkes and Alan Sharland, encouraged them to experience life a little more to help provide inspiration for their songs.

Serpell enjoyed a revival of Sailor's success, which started in the early 1990s when the four original members reformed the band. Until retiring in 2011, he toured the UK and Europe with the band. Sailor disbanded in 2010.

== Personal life ==
Grant married Michelle Kingsland in 1966 and a year later they had their first child, Edmund Charles, followed two years later by their second child, Charlotte Anna.

== Discography ==
According to AllMusic, Serpell contributed to the following albums:

=== Affinity ===
- Affinity (1970)

=== Sailor ===
- Sailor — Released: August 1974 — Label: Epic
- Trouble — Released: November 1975 — Label: Epic
- The Third Step — Released: September 1976 — Label: Epic
- Checkpoint — Released: August 1977 — Label: Epic
- Hideaway — Released: September 1978 — Label: Epic
- Dressed for Drowning — Released: 1980 — Label: Epic
