= With the Eyes of a Child =

1969 single by Cliff Richard

- Cover of the single released in the Netherlands

Single by Cliff Richard
- B-side: "So Long"
- Released: 21 November 1969
- Recorded: 29 July 1969
- Studio: EMI Studios, London
- Genre: Pop
- Length: 2:55
- Label: Columbia
- Songwriters: Guy Fletcher; Doug Flett
- Producer: Peter Vince

Cliff Richard singles chronology
"Throw Down a Line" (1969)	"With the Eyes of a Child" (1969)	"The Joy of Living" (1970)

"With the Eyes of a Child" is a song by British singer Cliff Richard, released as a single in November 1969. It peaked at number 20 on the UK Singles Chart.

== Release and reception ==
"With the Eyes of a Child" was written by songwriting duo Guy Fletcher and Doug Flett, who had previously written "Wonderful World" and "What's More (I Don't Need Her)" for Richard and who would go on to write numerous more for him, such as "Sing a Song of Freedom" and "Power to All Our Friends". It was produced by Peter Vince, credited on the record as 'An NP [Norrie Paramor] production by Peter Vince'. It was released with the B-side "So Long", written by Chris Arnold, David Martin and Geoff Morrow.

Reviewing for New Musical Express, Derek Johnson described "With the Eyes of a Child" as "an enchanting ballad with a philosophic lyric pleading for universal brotherhood. And while it isn't strictly a Christmas disc, its release is in keeping with the season of goodwill".

== Track listing ==
7": Columbia / DB 8641

1. "With the Eyes of a Child" – 2:55
2. "So Long" – 2:38

== Personnel ==
- Cliff Richard – vocals
- Mike Vickers Orchestra – all instrumentation

== Chart position ==
Chart (1969–70)	Peak position
Australia (Kent Music Report)	74
Ireland (IRMA)	16
UK Singles (OCC)	20
