= Soul Passing Through Soul =

Single by Toyah

from the album Minx
- B-side: "All in a Rage"
- Released: June 1985
- Genre: New wave; pop
- Length: 3:52
- Label: Portrait
- Songwriter(s): Toyah Willcox; Michael St James
- Producer(s): Christopher Neil

Toyah singles chronology
"Don't Fall in Love (I Said)" (1985)	"Soul Passing Through Soul" (1985)	"World in Action" (1985)

Music video
- "Soul Passing Through Soul" on YouTube

"Soul Passing Through Soul" is a song by British singer Toyah Willcox, released as the second single from her album Minx in 1985 by Portrait Records.

== Background ==
The song was written by Toyah Willcox and Michael St James, and produced by Christopher Neil. The backing instrumentation of the track mirrors the riff of David Bowie's "'Heroes'" which was performed by Toyah's future husband, Robert Fripp. Released in June 1985, the single failed to enter the UK Top 40, peaking at number 57. It spent three weeks on the UK Singles Chart. The single B-side, "All in a Rage", was also taken from Minx. The extended mix which features on the 12" vinyl was added to the 2005 CD reissue of Minx. The cover photograph was taken by Terence Donovan and pictures Toyah wearing a fiberglass bodice previously sported by Grace Jones.

== Music video ==
The music video for the song was directed by Jay Williams and pictures Toyah and dancers performing dance routines based on Buddhist prayers and tai chi.

== Track listing ==
- 7" single

A. "Soul Passing Through Soul" (Toyah Willcox, Michael St James) – 3:52
B. "All in a Rage" (Willcox, Joel Bogen) – 3:28

- 12" single

A. "Soul Passing Through Soul" (Extended Mix) (Willcox, St James) – 4:48
B1. "Soul Passing Through Soul" (Willcox, St James) – 3:50
B2. "All in a Rage" (Willcox, Bogen) – 3:28

== Personnel ==
- Toyah Willcox – vocals, backing vocals
- Michael St James – backing vocals
- Christopher Neil – backing vocals
- Andy Brown – bass
- Peter Van Hooke – drums
- Al Hodge – guitar
- Ian Wherry – keyboards
- Frank Ricotti – percussion
- Ray Beavis – saxophone
- John Earle – saxophone

== Charts ==
Chart (1985)	Peak position
UK Singles (Official Charts Company)	57
