= Living in Harmony =

Living in Harmony may refer to:

- "Living in Harmony" (song), a 1972 song by British singer Cliff Richard
- "Living in Harmony" (The Prisoner), an episode of the British TV series The Prisoner
