= Sailor (Sailor album) =

1974 studio album by Sailor (British music group)

Studio album by Sailor
- Released: August 1974
- Recorded: 16 May 1974
- Studio: Morgan, London
- Genre: Pop rock; folk rock; cabaret
- Length: 34:23
- Label: Epic
- Producer: Georg Kajanus

Sailor chronology
Sailor (1974)	Trouble (1975)

Singles from Sailor
- 1. "Traffic Jam" Released: August 1974

Sailor is the debut studio album by British rock group Sailor, released in August 1974 by Epic Records, and produced by Georg Kajanus.

== Background ==
=== Production and songs ===
Sailor recorded their debut album on 16 May 1974 at the Studio 2 section of Morgan Studios. The title track "Sailor" features a foghorn sound, replicated by an ARP 2600 synthesiser with echoes and reverbs. "Traffic Jam" was the only song recorded prior to their studio session, as it was part of a demo tape. All of the members of Sailor have expressed acknowledgement of the Beach Boys being influential to their sound in the album, each having owned a copy of Surf's Up on LP.

Georg Kajanus intended for the debut album to revolve around prostitutes and sailors, viewing it as a concept album. In a 1974 interview for Record Mirror, Henry Marsh describes the musical content of Kajanus' songs as "polite, not offensive", suggesting that the sailors in the songs are "more loveable" characters than the lyrics suggest. "The Girls of Amsterdam" and "Sailor's Night at the Town" were inspired by Kajanus' recollection of his time at the red light district around Europe and Mexico.

== Release and critical reception ==
Professional ratings
Review scores
Source	Rating
The Encyclopedia of Popular Music	3/5 stars
AllMusic	3.5/5 stars

Sailor was released in August 1974 by Epic Records. With an accompanying single "Traffic Jam", the album was supported by a series of tours, including a scheduled, but later cancelled concert tour with rock band Mott The Hoople, where Sailor was a supporting act, and a television appearance on BBC Two's music series In Concert, broadcast on 4 September 1974. Their TV appearance attracted the attention of the National Viewers' and Listeners' Association (alluded as the "Whitehouse brigade" by Record Mirror) over the word "flasher", and mentions of automobile brands like Ford Motors and the Volkswagen Beetle in the performed song, "Traffic Jam", which they perceived as advertisement. Despite this, the album and its accompanying singles had a favourable and welcoming reception.

CashBox remarked favourably that in "Traffic Jam", Sailor showed "tremendous poise" with its "lighthearted happy sound and an infectious beat which could take it all the way to the top". Sounds noted that the reception was enthusiastic in countries like the Netherlands, and described Sailor's music as "idiosyncratic", remarking that they hoped "British audiences will respond to them as open-mindedly as the Dutch did". Alan Francis, writing for Record Mirror, was favourable to the "faultless harmonies" of "Josephine Baker" and "Traffic Jam" in one of their live performances supporting the debut album, stating that Sailor encompassed a mix of "folk, rock, and pop" but did not have a "cluttered sound".

Writing for AllMusic, Dave Thompson compared Sailor's music style in the debut album to The Beach Boys, 10cc, and Jacques Brel and named "Traffic Jam", "Let's Go to Town", and "Josephine Baker" as exemplary songs that fully reflects the "magic of this band". Music writer Colin Larkin gave the album three stars out of five stars. Reviewing for the Cherry Red Records boxed set Sailor: The Albums 1974-78 including a reissue of Sailor, Kevin Rathert in It's Psychedelic Baby! Magazine noted the vocal harmonies in Sailor and described the album as a mix of "light hearted, red light district folk tunes" and "excellent cabaret style tunes" that makes for a "pleasant listen".

== Track listing ==
All songs written by Georg Kajanus.

Side one
No.	Title	Length
1.	"Traffic Jam"	3:24
2.	"Blue Desert"	3:45
3.	"Sailor"	2:57
4.	"The Girls of Amsterdam"	3:08
5.	"The Street"	3:32

Side two
No.	Title	Length
1.	"Let's Go to Town"	4:04
2.	"Josephine Baker"	4:00
3.	"Blame it on the Soft Spot"	3:39
4.	"Open Up the Door"	2:30
5.	"Sailor's Night on the Town"	3:24
Total length:		34:23

== Personnel ==
Personnel per Epic Records, James McCarraher, and AllMusic.

Sailor

- Georg Kajanus – lead vocals, twelve-string acoustic guitar
- Phil Pickett – electric bass, piano, nickelodeon (keyboards), vocals
- Henry Marsh – accordion, piano, nickelodeon, vocals
- Grant Serpell – drums, percussion, vocals

Production

- Georg Kajanus – producer, director
- Dan Loggins – executive producer
- Robin Black – recording engineer
- David Harris – recording engineer
- Rosław Szaybo – art direction (sleeve design)
- Simon Cantwell – art direction (back sleeve)
- Brian D. Hennessey – photography

== Charts ==
Original release

Chart (1974–75)	Position
Dutch Albums (Album Top 100)	2
Australian Albums (Kent Music Report)	96
