= Don't Fall in Love (I Said) =

Single by Toyah

from the album Minx
- B-side: "Snow Covers the Kiss"; "Kiss the Devil"
- Released: April 1985
- Genre: New wave; pop
- Length: 3:40
- Label: Portrait
- Songwriters: Toyah Willcox; Simon Darlow
- Producer: Christopher Neil

Toyah singles chronology
"The Vow" (1983)	"Don't Fall in Love (I Said)" (1985)	"Soul Passing Through Soul" (1985)

Music video
- "Don't Fall in Love (I Said)" on YouTube

"Don't Fall in Love (I Said)" is a song by British singer Toyah Willcox, released as the lead single from her album Minx in 1985 by Portrait Records. It was a top-40 chart success in the UK and Ireland.

== Background ==
The song was written by Toyah Willcox and Simon Darlow, and produced by Christopher Neil. The lyrics of the track tell about love from a cynical point of view. It was Toyah's first single as a solo artist, released in April 1985, over a year and 5 months after the Toyah band's final single "The Vow". "Don't Fall in Love" spent a total of 6 weeks on the UK Singles Chart, peaking at number 22. It also reached number 17 in Ireland and was Toyah's only entry on the pan-European singles chart (at number 71). The B-sides from the 7" and 12" vinyl, together with the extended mix of the title song, appeared on the 2005 CD reissue of Minx.

== Music video ==
The song's music video was directed by Terence Donovan who also took photographs for the single as well as the Minx album covers. The clip pictures Willcox strutting through Wimbledon Common in London at night, wearing a latex dress.

== Track listing ==
- 7" single

A. "Don't Fall in Love (I Said)" (Toyah Willcox, Simon Darlow) – 3:40
B. "Snow Covers the Kiss" (Willcox, Joel Bogen, Christopher Neil) – 3:13

- 12" single

A. "Don't Fall in Love (I Said)" (Extended Mix) (Willcox, Darlow) – 5:13
B1. "Snow Covers the Kiss" (Willcox, Bogen, Neil) – 3:13
B2. "Kiss the Devil" (Willcox, Adrian Lee) – 3:21

== Personnel ==
- Toyah Willcox – vocals, backing vocals
- Linda Taylor – backing vocals
- Lorna Wright – backing vocals
- Peter Van Hooke – drums
- Al Hodge – guitar
- Simon Darlow – keyboards
- Ian Wherry – keyboards

== Charts ==
Chart (1985)	Peak position
European Singles (Music & Media)	71
Irish Singles (IRMA)	17
UK Singles (Official Charts Company)	22
