= Lady Put the Light Out (song) =

Single by Rogue
- B-side: "Sweet City Lady"
- Released: 1977
- Genre: Soft rock
- Length: 3:24
- Label: Epic
- Songwriter(s): Guy Fletcher, Doug Flett
- Producer(s): Guy Fletcher

Rogue singles chronology
"Dedication" (1976)	"Lady Put the Light Out" (1977)	"Borderline" (1979)

"Lady Put the Light Out" is a 1977 song by British soft rock band Rogue. It was covered by Frankie Valli on his 1977 album Lady Put the Light Out, by Joe Cocker on his 1978 album Luxury You Can Afford, and by Tom Jones on his 1998 compilation album More Great Hits from Tom Jones.
