= Don't Forget to Catch Me =

1968 single by Cliff Richard and the Shadows

- Cover of the single released in the Netherlands

Single by Cliff Richard and the Shadows

from the album Established 1958
- B-side: "What's More (I Don't Need Her)"
- Released: 15 November 1968
- Recorded: 31 May 1968
- Studio: EMI Studios, London
- Genre: Pop
- Length: 2:46
- Label: Columbia
- Songwriters: Hank Marvin; Bruce Welch; Brian Bennett
- Producer: Norrie Paramor

Cliff Richard and the Shadows singles chronology
| "Marianne" (1968) | "Don't Forget to Catch Me" (1968) | "Good Times (Better Times)" (1969) |

"Don't Forget to Catch Me" is a song by Cliff Richard and the Shadows, released as a single in November 1968 from their album Established 1958. It peaked at number 21 on the UK Singles Chart.

== Release and reception ==
"Don't Forget to Catch Me" was written by the Shadows' Hank Marvin, Bruce Welch and Brian Bennett and it became Richard's final single to feature the group until the 2009 cover of "Singing the Blues". The B-side "What's More (I Don't Need Her)" was written by Guy Fletcher and Doug Flett and wasn't sung with the Shadows. Instead, it features backing vocals by the Breakaways and accompaniment by the Mike Leander Orchestra.

Reviewing for New Musical Express, Derek Johnson described "Don't Forget to Catch Me" as "an easy-going number with a jaunty jog-trotting beat, casually but effectively handled by Cliff". and that "the tune is basically simple and immensely catchy and it's in the sing-along vein. Not a song to be handed down to prosperity but having sufficient instant appeal to carry it up the Chart". Penny Valentine for Disc and Music Echo was much more scathing of the single, writing: "'Presumably because he's celebrating his tenth anniversary in pop – though I hardly find this a good enough excuse – they have issued this track from Cliff's LP Established 1958. I find it a bit pointless and sad. Lately, Cliff surprised me by coming up with some quite good records – Marianne being one of the best – and it's a shame that this is reverting back to the corny, boring stuff of years gone by. A waste of time, talent and people's ears".

== Track listing ==
7": Columbia / DB 8503

1. "Don't Forget to Catch Me" – 2:46
2. "What's More (I Don't Need Her)" – 2:33

== Personnel ==
- Cliff Richard – vocals
- Hank Marvin – lead guitar, backing vocals
- Bruce Welch – rhythm guitar, backing vocals
- John Rostill – bass guitar, backing vocals
- Brian Bennett – drums
- Norrie Paramor Orchestra – orchestra accompaniment

== Charts ==
| Chart (1968–69) | Peak position |
|---|---|
| Australia (Kent Music Report) | 47 |
| South Africa (Springbok Radio) | 9 |
| UK Singles (OCC) | 21 |
