= Sing a Song of Freedom =

1971 single by Cliff Richard

- Cover of the single released in Sweden

Single by Cliff Richard
- B-side: "A Thousand Conversations"
- Released: 29 October 1971
- Recorded: 24 August 1971
- Studio: EMI Studios, London
- Genre: Pop rock
- Length: 3:24
- Label: Columbia
- Songwriters: Guy Fletcher; Doug Flett
- Producer: Norrie Paramor

Cliff Richard singles chronology
"Flying Machine" (1971)	"Sing a Song of Freedom" (1971)	"Jesus" (1972)

"Sing a Song of Freedom" is a song by British singer Cliff Richard, released as a single in October 1971. It peaked at number 13 on the UK Singles Chart.

== Release ==
"Sing a Song of Freedom" was written by songwriting duo Guy Fletcher and Doug Flett and was arranged by and features an orchestral accompaniment by Brian Bennet. In Cliff Richard: The Biography, writer Steve Turner wrote that "Sing a Song of Freedom" "was an all-purpose anthem with no real message which drew upon the popular banner-waving slogans of campus politics". It was, however, banned in South Africa due to the repressive politics there at the time.

It was released as a single with the B-side "A Thousand Conversations", written by Hank Marvin and Bruce Welch, which had been first released by their group Marvin, Welch & Farrar on their debut eponymous album.

== Track listing ==
7": Columbia / DB 8836

1. "Sing a Song of Freedom" – 3:24
2. "A Thousand Conversations" – 2:18

== Personnel ==
- Cliff Richard – vocals
- Big Jim Sullivan – guitar
- The Breakaways – backing vocals
- Brian Bennett Orchestra – all other instrumentation

== Charts ==
Chart (1971–72)	Peak position
Denmark (IFPI)	6
Germany (GfK)	42
Malaysia (Rediffusion)	1
Sweden (Kvällstoppen)	14
UK Singles (OCC)	13
