= Fallen Angel (Rogue song) =

1975 single by Rogue

Single by Rogue

from the album Fallen Angels
- B-side: "Morning Comes Quickly" / "Mother Nature" / "Run for Shelter" / "We Could Use a Little Rain"
- Released: 1975
- Genre: Soft rock
- Length: 3:50
- Label: Epic
- Songwriters: Guy Fletcher, Doug Flett
- Producer: Guy Fletcher

Rogue singles chronology
"Cool Clear Air" (1975)	"Fallen Angel" (1975)	"Lay Me Down" (1976)

"Fallen Angel"

Single by Frankie Valli

from the album Fallen Angel
- B-side: "Carrie (I Wouldn't Marry You)"
- Released: March 1976
- Genre: Soft rock
- Label: Private Stock
- Songwriters: Guy Fletcher, Doug Flett
- Producer: Bob Gaudio

Frankie Valli singles chronology
"Our Day Will Come" (1975)	"Fallen Angel" (1976)	"We're All Alone" (1976)

"Fallen Angel" is a song by British soft rock band Rogue from their debut album Fallen Angels. Produced by band member Guy Fletcher, it was released as a single in 1975 and was a hit in the Netherlands, peaking at No. 12 on the Dutch Top 40. In the U.S., the song missed the Billboard Hot 100 by 8 places, reaching No. 108 in 1976 (No. 8 on the Bubbling Under the Hot 100 chart).

== Frankie Valli cover ==
In 1976, the song was covered by Frankie Valli; this version was a hit in both the UK and U.S., peaking at numbers 11 and 36, respectively. On the U.S. Adult Contemporary chart, the song peaked at No. 9. Its biggest success was in Ireland, where it reached No. 3 on the Irish Singles Chart.

The song is featured in the Broadway musical Jersey Boys. The musical repurposes the song as its eleven o'clock number, sung by Valli as he mourns the death of his daughter Francine (who in real life died four years after the song was released).

== Chart history ==
Rogue

Chart (1975–76)	Peak position
Netherlands (Dutch Top 40)	12
U.S. Billboard Bubbling Under the Hot 100	8

Frankie Valli cover

Chart (1976)	Peak position
Canada RPM Adult Contemporary	23
Ireland (IRMA)	3
UK Singles (OCC)	11
U.S. Billboard Hot 100	36
U.S. Billboard Adult Contemporary	9
U.S. Cash Box Top 100	49
