= Silvery Rain =

1971 song written by Hank Marvin

- Cover of the single released in Belgium

Single by Cliff Richard
- B-side: "Annabella Umbrella" "Time Flies"
- Released: 26 March 1971
- Recorded: 17 November 1970
- Studio: EMI Studios, London
- Genre: Pop
- Length: 3:46
- Label: Columbia
- Songwriter: Hank Marvin
- Producer: Norrie Paramor

Cliff Richard singles chronology
"Sunny Honey Girl" (1971)	"Silvery Rain" (1971)	"Flying Machine" (1971)

"Silvery Rain" is a song composed by Hank Marvin and first released by Marvin, Welch & Farrar on their eponymous debut album in February 1971. It was also recorded by Cliff Richard, who released it as a single in March 1971. His version peaked at number 27 on the UK Singles Chart.

== Cliff Richard version ==
=== Release ===
"Silvery Rain" was released with two B-sides. The first, "Annabella Umbrella", was written by Valerie Avon and Harold Spiro and features an accompaniment by the Nick Ingam Orchestra. The second, "Time Flies", was written by Brian Bennett and Mike Hawker.

"Silvery Rain" has been described as a being a "social comment on the problems of pesticides and poisons". Derek Johnson for New Musical Express described it as "one of the least commercial and uncharacteristic he has ever recorded".

=== Track listing ===
7": Columbia / DB 8774

1. "Silvery Rain" – 3:46
2. "Annabella Umbrella" – 2:49
3. "Time Flies" – 2:54

=== Personnel ===
- Cliff Richard – vocals
- Big Jim Sullivan – guitar
- Brian Bennett Orchestra – all other instrumentation

=== Charts ===
Chart (1971)	Peak position
Denmark (IFPI)	18
Netherlands (Dutch Top 40 Tipparade)	17
Netherlands (Single Tip)	10
UK Singles (OCC)	27

== Other versions ==
- In 1981, Australian singer Olivia Newton-John covered "Silvery Rain" on her 1981 album Physical and also released an accompanying music video for the song.
