= Lady Put the Light Out =

Studio album by Frankie Valli
- Released: November 1977
- Studios: Mediasound, New York City
- Length: 38:48
- Label: Private Stock
- Producer: Charles Calello

Frankie Valli chronology
Valli (1976)	Lady Put the Light Out (1977)	Frankie Valli... Is the Word (1978)

Lady Put the Light Out is an album by Frankie Valli, released in November 1977. It was his final album for Private Stock Records, which folded in early 1978.

== Background, composition and recording ==
After The Four Seasons' 1977 album Helicon had seen diminished success compared to its predecessor Who Loves You, the band went separate ways to pursue other projects and tend to their personal lives. Valli, whose role in the Seasons had diminished in the late 1970s due to a record company strategy to differentiate Valli's Private Stock solo records from the Seasons' albums on Warner Bros. Records, took the opportunity to launch his first true solo album and tour. Unlike previous Valli solo albums, this would have no involvement from the Seasons nor from Valli's usual producers and songwriters Bob Gaudio or Bob Crewe, instead hiring another former Season, Charles Calello, to produce the album.

Valli assembled some New York City session players for the album Lady Put the Light Out, and chose songs by songwriters such as Eric Carmen, Paul Anka, Carole Bayer Sager, and the team of Barry Mann and Cynthia Weil. The song "Native New Yorker", which was later covered in a hit version by the band Odyssey, was written by Sandy Linzer and Denny Randell, who had been writing songs for the Four Seasons since the 1960s. "I Need You" was also a hit for the band 3T.

== Track listing ==
1. "I Need You" (Eric Carmen) – 3:23
2. "Second Thoughts" (Paul Anka) – 3:15
3. "I Could Have Loved You" (Albert Hammond, Carole Bayer Sager) – 3:28
4. "With You" (Carole Bayer Sager, Ken Ascher) – 3:48
5. "Native New Yorker" (Denny Randell, Sandy Linzer) – 5:18
6. "Lady Put the Light Out" (Guy Fletcher, Doug Flett) – 4:28
7. "Boats Against the Current" (Eric Carmen) – 4:03
8. "Rainstorm" (Chris Andrews) – 3:55
9. "I'm Gonna Love You" (Barry Mann, Cynthia Weil) – 3:04
10. "There's Always a Goodbye" (Randy Richards) – 4:06

== Personnel ==
- Frankie Valli – vocals
- David Spinozza, Jay Berliner, Jeff Layton, Jeff Mironov, John Tropea, Lance Quinn, Vinnie Bell – guitar
- Bob Babbitt, Gordon Edwards, Wilbur Bascomb – bass guitar
- Kenny Ascher, Richard Tee – keyboards
- Larry Fast – synthesizer
- Allan Schwartzberg, Steve Gadd – drums
- David Friedman – percussion
- Richie Gajate-Garcia – congas
- Marvin Stamm – horns
- Gene Orloff – strings
- Margaret Ross – harp
- Helen Miles, Hilda Harris, Lani Groves, Linda November, Ullanda McCullough, Vivian Cherry, Yvonne Lewis – backing vocals
