= Phil Pickett =

English songwriter, musician (born 1946)

- Born: Phillip Stuart Pickett; 19 November 1946 (age 79); Münster, Germany
- Genres: Pop
- Instruments: Bass, keyboards, vocals, guitar
- Years active: 1973–present
- Formerly of: Sailor, Culture Club

Philip Stuart Pickett (born 19 November 1946) is an English songwriter, musician, vocal arranger, producer and artist manager.

Pickett is best known for being the bassist for the glam pop band Sailor, who had a number 2 UK chart song in 1975 with "A Glass of Champagne". In 1982, Pickett joined Culture Club as a keyboardist, and co-wrote their song "Karma Chameleon".

== Early years ==
Pickett was born in Münster, Germany. His father, Phillip George Pickett, was a jazz pianist and RAF pilot who died in a plane crash in Rhodesia in 1950 a day before his 27th birthday. With his death, Pickett and his mother, Eileen, moved to Birmingham, England in 1950. His early musical influences included Steve Winwood and the Rolling Stones.

After leaving school, he learned to trade as a baker and moved to San Francisco. While there, he joined Joan Baez School for Non Violence. With many young American men being called up to be drafted to Saigon, Phil quickly moved back to England, but not before meeting an idol of his, Duke Ellington, who urged him to "go back home and write your music". Instead of going back to Birmingham, he moved to London and began his work as a musician.

== Career ==
=== Sailor ===
Moving to London in 1969, Phil met Georg Kajanus, who was from Norway. They formed the duo Kajanis/Pickett but after meeting Henry Marsh and Grant Serpell, became the glam pop group Sailor. The band originally had fame in just Netherlands, having two top five hits in 1974 and 1975 before achieving nationwide success with their song "A Glass of Champagne", which went to number two in the UK (behind "Bohemian Rhapsody" by Queen) in 1975.

Sailor disbanded in 1978 and reformed with all four original members in 1989.

According to the band's own website, Sailor stopped performing in May 2014.

=== Culture Club ===
On returning to England from the US in 1982 Pickett, by now in demand as a session player and arranger, joined Boy George's band, Culture Club on keyboards and backing vocals initially co-writing "It's a Miracle" and "Karma Chameleon". The latter song, according to Sir Richard Branson (in Losing My Virginity) to whom his label Culture Club were signed "Became Number 1 in every country in the world that had a chart, selling 1.4 million records in the UK alone". This earned Pickett two Ivor Novello Awards, possibly the music industry's most prestigious songwriting award in 1983 – for "Best Pop Song" and "Highest-Selling A-side". Pickett played extensively on all of the band's records throughout this period. He also co-wrote many other songs with the band including "Move Away" produced by Arif Mardin which, in 1986, climbed to Number 7 in the US Billboard chart before the lead singer's drugs conviction in the UK, which eclipsed the band's career and prospects for several years afterwards.

Notable songs written by Pickett for Culture Club:

- "Karma Chameleon" (1983)
- "It's a Miracle" (1984)
- "Move Away" (1986)

=== Other projects ===
Pickett recorded the 1984 Olympic Games theme song, "Destiny" with MCA. Jon Moss from Culture Club contributed with drums and the single cover was created by fashion illustrator Tony Viramontes. In 1989, Pickett discovered charismatic Nigerian singer songwriter Keziah Jones busking in Portobello Road London, a relationship that soon evolved into management. In 1994, he sold his London studio to AC/DC.

Throughout a long career in the music industry, Pickett has also been associated with a variety of artists, writers and producers including Phil Ramone, Quincy Jones, Arif Mardin, Stewart Levine, Paul McCartney, Joe Cocker, Jeff Beck, Take That, Malcolm McLaren, BA Robertson, Robbie Williams, Van Morrison, and Sheena Easton and has written songs for West End musical theatre Casper and The Mask and Hollywood movies, including Electric Dreams, Top Secret!, White Nights, and The Lost Boys.

In July 2015, Pickett was invited to join the songwriting fraternity - The Society Of Distinguished Songwriters or "S.O.D's" as they are commonly known in the business. Other members include Sir Tim Rice, Justin Hayward, Mike Batt, Gary Barlow and Björn Ulvaeus.

== Personal life ==
With his wife Ann, they have three children: Jack (born 1975/1976), Gus (born 1980) and Harry (born 1991). In the 1990s, he moved his family from Gloucestershire to Cotswolds.

== Discography ==
Sailor

- Sailor (1974)
- Trouble (1975)
- The Third Step (1976)
- Checkpoint (1977)
- Hideaway (1978)
- Dressed for Drowning (1980)
- Sailor (1991)
- Street Lamp (1992)

Culture Club

- Kissing to Be Clever (1982)
- Colour by Numbers (1983)
- Waking Up with the House on Fire (1984)
- From Luxury to Heartache (1986)

== Other sources ==
- Losing My Virginity by Sir Richard Branson published by Crown Publishing Group, ISBN 978-0812932294
- Take It Like a Man by Boy George and Spencer Bright published by HarperCollins, ISBN 978-0060173685
- Karma Chameleon by Culture Club - Songfacts
