= Tracks 'n Grooves =

1970 studio album by Cliff Richard

Tracks ‘n Grooves

Studio album by Cliff Richard
- Released: 30 November 1970
- Recorded: June 1967 – September 1969
- Studio: Abbey Road
- Genres: Pop, Rock
- Label: EMI Columbia
- Producers: Norrie Paramor, Peter Vince

Cliff Richard chronology
| Sincerely (1969) | Tracks ‘n Grooves (1970) | The Best of Cliff Volume Two (1972) |

Tracks ‘n Grooves is the sixteenth studio album by British singer Cliff Richard, released in November 1970 on the EMI Columbia label. It is his thirtieth album overall. The album reached #37 in the UK Album Charts.

A year earlier, the opening track "Early in the Morning" was released as a single in several countries but not in the UK. It reached number 1 in Japan in December 1969 and was later listed in Billboard as 13th on the list of Japan's "Foreign Hits of 1970". Vanity Fare also released the song as a single around the same time, including in the UK, where their version reached the top ten.

== Track listing ==
Side One

1. "Early in the Morning" (Mike Leander, Eddie Seago)
2. "As I Walk Into the Morning of Your Life" (Joe Brooks)
3. "Love, Truth & Emily Stone” (Hank Marvin, Petrina Lordan)
4. "My Head Goes Around" (Geoff Goddard)
5. "Put My Mind at Ease" (Neil Diamond)
6. "Abraham, Martin & John" (Dick Holler)
7. "The Girl Can’t Help It" (Bobby Troup)
8. "Bang Bang (My Baby Shot Me Down)" (Sonny Bono)

Side Two

1. "I’ll Make It All Up To You" (Charlie Rich)
2. "I’d Just Be Fool Enough" (Melvin Endsley)
3. "Don’t Let Tonight Ever End" (Sylvana Simoni, Giulio Libano, Jack Wood)
4. "What a Silly Thing To Do" (Terry Britten)
5. "Your Heart’s Not In Your Love" (Neil Sedaka, Carole Bayer)
6. "Don't Ask Me to Be Friends" (Jack Keller, Gerry Goffin)
7. "Are You Only Fooling Me" (Raymond Froggatt)

== Production ==
- All tracks produced by Norrie Paramor except Side 1 Track 3 by Peter Vince
- Side 1, Tracks 1, 3 & 4 Arranged and Conducted by Mike Vickers.
- Side 2, Track 7 Arranged and Conducted by Mike Vickers.
- Side 1, Tracks 2, 5 & 7 Arranged and Conducted by Mike Leander
- Side 2, Tracks 1, 2, 3 & 4 Arranged and Conducted by Mike Leander
- Side 1, Track 6 & Side 2 Track 5 Arranged and Conducted by Nick Ingram
- Side 1, Track 8 Arranged by Brian Bennett, Conducted by Norrie Paramor
- Side 2, Track 6 Arranged and Conducted by Bernard Ebbinghouse
