= Marvin, Welch & Farrar (album) =

Marvin, Welch, & Farrar

Studio album by Marvin, Welch & Farrar
- Released: February 1971
- Studio: EMI Studios, London
- Genre: Folk rock; soft rock
- Label: Regal Zonophone
- Producer: Hank Marvin; Bruce Welch; John Farrar

Marvin, Welch & Farrar chronology
Marvin, Welch, & Farrar (1971)	Second Opinion (1971)

Singles from Marvin, Welch & Farrar
- 1. "Faithful" Released: 1971

Marvin, Welch & Farrar is the debut album of British-Australian music group Marvin, Welch & Farrar, released in February 1971.

== Critical reception ==
Professional ratings
Review scores
Source	Rating
AllMusic	3/5 stars
Disc and Music Echo	3/5 stars

Disc and Music Echo wrote: "The guitars/drums/vocal format is tried-and-true – yet in their case particularly pleasing. But the Hank/Bruce songs, while good, smell somewhat of those CSN&Y-cum-Hollies harmonies. Therefore, despite their appeal, they tend to become predictable in parts. Their "Faithful" single is included, and Hank and Bruce deserve full marks for a very pretty album, even if it doesn't exactly stop you in your tracks".

In a retrospective review for AllMusic, Dave Thompson wrote "Marvin Welch & Farrar may or may not be the template around which everyone from vintage 10cc to classic Wishbone Ash modeled their magic. But it certainly sounds like it should have been." They also wrote "Marvin, Welch and Farrar crafted a rousing, respectable and utterly enjoyable early 1970s rock album".

== Track listing ==
1. "You're Burning Bridges" (Hank Marvin) - 4:00
2. "A Thousand Conversations" (Bruce Welch, Hank Marvin) -
3. "Brownie Kentucky" (Hank Marvin) - 2:32
4. "My Home Town" (Hank Marvin, Bruce Welch, John Farrar) - 3:14
5. "Silvery Rain" (Hank Marvin) - 2:30
6. "Throw Down a Line" (Hank Marvin) - 3:20
7. "Baby I'm Calling You" (Bruce Welch, Hank Marvin) - 2:46
8. "Faithful" (Hank Marvin, Bruce Welch, John Farrar) - 2:19
9. "Mistress Fate & Father Time" (Bruce Welch, Hank Marvin) - 3:13
10. "Take Her Away" (Bruce Welch, Hank Marvin)
11. "Wish You Were Here" (Bruce Welch, Hank Marvin) - 3:20
12. "Mr. Sun" (Bruce Welch, Hank Marvin) - 2:45

The North American release omits "A Thousand Conversations" and "Take Her Away"

== Personnel ==
Marvin, Welch & Farrar

- Hank Marvin – vocals, guitar
- Bruce Welch – vocals, guitar
- John Farrar – vocals, guitar, string arrangement

with:

- Dave Richmond – bass guitar
- Peter Vince – occasional piano and organ
- Alan Hawkshaw – occasional piano and organ
- Clem Cattini – drums
- Graeme Hall – strings conductor

Technical

- Peter Vince - engineer
- Richard Lush – tape operator
- Hipgnosis – cover design, photography

== Charts ==
Chart (1971)	Peak position
UK Albums (OCC)	30
