= Henry Marsh (musician) =

English musician and composer

- Born: Ian Henry Murray Marsh; 8 December 1948 (age 77); Bath, Somerset, England, UK
- Instruments: Keyboards, guitar, vocals
- Years active: 1973–present
- Formerly of: Sailor

Ian Henry Murray Marsh (born 8 December 1948) is an English musician and composer, best known as a member of the pop group Sailor.

== Early life ==
Marsh was born in Bath, Somerset. He is the great-great-great grandson of Lord Collingwood and son of Ken Marsh, a racecar driver. He was educated at Sherborne School and New College, Oxford.

Marsh's first group was at school; Jeremy Irons was the drummer. After Oxford, Marsh joined a group with, among others, John G. Perry, at first called Toast, which expanded to become Gringo.

== Career ==
=== Sailor ===
He was invited in 1973 by Phil Pickett to join a group called Kajanus Pickett, after Pickett and Georg Kajanus. The group became Sailor with the inclusion of Grant Serpell. On stage Marsh was known for playing the Nickelodeon, a large instrument designed by Kajanus consisting of two upright pianos, two synthesizers, mini organs and glockenspiels. Sailor's original line-up split up in 1978, although Pickett and Marsh released more material as Sailor with Gavin and Virginia David in 1980, with an album of Pickett compositions called Dressed for Drowning. After Sailor disbanded, he worked with Kajanus on DATA and "And The Mamluks", a short-lived electronic-music project. In 1989 Sailor reformed with Marsh. He left in 1999 but returned in 2005. Marsh's sons, Oliver and Thomas, have also performed with the band in reformed gigs. Throughout this time, Marsh recorded numerous library music albums, including Tribute To The Sixties.

=== Composing ===
Marsh eventually teamed up with writer Barry Mason in 1986. They and David H. Bell, a Broadway director, wrote a musical called Malibu, first performed in 1991. He wrote another musical, Casper—The Musical, with Pickett in 1999. Marsh wrote musical scores for other theatre productions including Romeo and Juliet, The Grapes of Wrath and The Dark at the Top of the Stairs. He received the Joseph Jefferson Award for Best Original Music in Theater Production in 1998 for The Comedy of Errors, and in 1999 for Much Ado About Nothing. He also received a best composer nomination for As You Like It in 2002. In 2004 he was nominated for two Jefferson Awards for The Taming of the Shrew and A Midsummer Night's Dream. His musical theatre work in the USA included One Last Summer, In Stitches and Female Problems for which he received a nomination for Best New Work. His musical theatre work in the UK included The Mask, Spider-Man and Casper.

As joint owner of MB Productions with award-winning writer, composer and performer Paul Boross (formerly of comedy music acts Morris Minor and the Majors with Tony Hawks, and The Calypso Twins with Ainsley Harriott), Marsh was also commissioned to compose numerous scores for television programmes shown by the BBC, ITV, Channel 4, Sky, and other TV channel networks during the 1990s and 2000s. These included Eye of the Storm, Pirates, Blockbusters, Strike It Rich, Win Lose Or Draw, Backdate, Get Wet, Butterfingers, House Invaders, and The Fastest Man On Earth, as well as several presentation packages and advertisement campaigns. His solo library music has been used worldwide, including in The Fresh Prince of Bel-Air, Private Parts, Father Ted, Home and Away, Peak Practice and many others. During the 2010s, Marsh composed the music for independently produced short films SON of Nosferatu (2011) and Reg (2016).

== Personal life ==
In April 1970 Marsh married Susan Norddahl; they had two sons and a daughter before their divorce. Marsh subsequently married Patricia "Dee Dee" Wilde, founder member of Pan's People. They jointly run WM Productions, a video production company. As of 2002, they lived in Rood Ashton, Wiltshire. Marsh has been practising Transcendental Meditation since the early 1980s; Wilde is also a practitioner.
