= Guy Fletcher (songwriter) =

English recording artist; songwriter

Guy Fletcher OBE
- Born: Mervyn Guy Fletcher; 21 April 1944 (age 82); St Albans, Hertfordshire, England
- Genres: Pop, soft rock
- Occupations: Record producer, singer, songwriter
- Years active: 1960s–present
- Website: Guyfletcher.com

Mervyn Guy Fletcher OBE (born 21 April 1944) is an English record producer, singer and songwriter who, in partnership with Doug Flett, wrote several hits for other artists. As a singer, he had a small hit in the Netherlands and other European countries with the song "Mary in the Morning" (1971). With Rogue, Fletcher had a minor hit with "Fallen Angel" in 1975.

Fletcher was chairman of PRS for Music from 1 January 2011 until 31 December 2016.

== Life and career ==
Fletcher was born on 21 April 1944 in St Albans, Hertfordshire, England. He was educated at Sir Joseph Williamson's Mathematical School.

He worked as a session singer for the record producer Joe Meek, and as a jazz trumpet player. After deciding to turn to songwriting, he met lyricist Doug Flett in 1966 and their long partnership resulted in writing songs for several international artists. They were the first British writers to have a song recorded by Elvis Presley, when "The Fair's Movin' On" appeared on the B-side of his 1969 single "Clean Up Your Own Backyard". Other Presley recordings followed, including "Wonderful World", the opening song in the film, Live a Little, Love a Little and "Just Pretend", featured in That's The Way It Is.

Fletcher and Flett's first UK top 10 success was with the Hollies' "I Can't Tell the Bottom from the Top" (1970), and they also had hits with songs performed by Cliff Richard, "With the Eyes of a Child", "Sing a Song of Freedom", "Baby You're Dynamite" and "Power to All Our Friends", which was the UK entry for the 1973 Eurovision Song Contest, achieving third place.

Their greatest international success was with "Save Me", a No. 6 hit on the Billboard Hot Country Singles & Tracks chart, when released in 1983 by Louise Mandrell. "Save Me" was also a Billboard Hot 100 entry for American stars Donna McDaniel and Merrilee Rush in 1977 and was recorded by Helen Reddy for her 1981 album Play Me Out. In 1977, the South-African band Clout had a hit with it around Europe (No. 4 in Germany and Switzerland, No. 5 in Belgium, No. 6 in the Netherlands). Fletcher and Flett also wrote hits for Ray Charles ("Is There Anyone Out There"), Tom Jones, Joe Cocker ("Lady Put the Light Out") and the Bay City Rollers ("Dedication"). Fletcher and Flett also discovered, managed and published for Chris de Burgh.

In 1975, Fletcher formed the soft rock trio Rogue, with former Onyx guitarist Al Hodge and John Hodkinson. They released three albums and several singles, including "Cool Clear Air", "Lay Me Down", "Lady Put the Light Out", "Too Much Too Soon", "One to One", and "Borderline". Their song "Fallen Angel" was a No. 12 hit in the Netherlands in January 1976; Frankie Valli's recording went to No. 11 on the UK Singles Chart in May 1976, before being featured in the Broadway show Jersey Boys. The band disbanded in 1979.

In 1985, Fletcher sang vocals on various songs for the BBC children's TV series Bertha.

Fletcher was chairman of PRS for Music where he had been a director since 1998. He served six years as chairman and was succeeded by Nigel Elderton. Fletcher is chairman and managing director of the rights management company, Commercial Arts Ltd. He was for twelve years the chairman of the British Academy of Songwriters, Composers and Authors, where he led several campaigns against the erosion of composers' rights. He has won many awards including an ASCAP award in the US and an Ivor Novello Award in the UK. Fletcher has also composed TV music, songs, commercials and music for the stage.

In 2005, he was honoured in HM the Queen's birthday honours list with an OBE for services to British music.

== Family ==
Fletcher has a nephew, also called Guy Fletcher, who has been a longtime keyboardist for both Mark Knopfler and his former band Dire Straits.

He has five children (three daughters and two sons), including children's television presenter Justin Fletcher.

== Discography ==
- Guy Fletcher (Philips, 1971)
- When the Morning Comes (Philips, 1972)
- Bertha: Songs from the BBC TV series (BBC Records and Tapes, 1985)

Rogue albums

- Fallen Angels (Epic 69235, 1975)
- Let It Go (Epic 81987, 1977)
- Would You Let Your Daughter (Ariola 5028, 1979)
