= Jesus (Jeremy Faith song) =

1971 single by Jeremy Faith

Single by Jeremy Faith and the St Mathews Church Choir And Orchestra

from the album Lord
- B-side: "Jesus (Instrumental)"
- Released: June 1971
- Genre: Christian rock; contemporary Christian
- Length: 3:44
- Label: Decca
- Songwriters: Michel Hamburger; Pierre Darjean
- Producer: Michel Hamburger

Jeremy Faith and the St Mathews Church Choir And Orchestra singles chronology
"Jesus" (1971)	"You Are My Lord "J"" (1971)

"Jesus" is a song by Austrian rock musician Helmut Grabher, under the alias Jeremy Faith, released as a single in June 1971 from his album Lord. It was a hit in several European countries and was later covered by Cliff Richard, who had a minor hit with it.

== Charts ==
Chart (1971–72)	Peak position
Belgium (Ultratop 50 Flanders)	6
Belgium (Ultratop 50 Wallonia)	2
France (IFOP)	3
Italy (Musica e dischi)	18
Netherlands (Dutch Top 40 Tipparade)	5
Spain (El Musical)	29
Sweden (Kvällstoppen)	5

== Certifications ==
Region	Certification	Certified units/sales
France (SNEP)	Gold	500,000^{*}
^{*} Sales figures based on certification alone.

== Cliff Richard version ==
"Jesus"
- Cover of the single released in Germany

Single by Cliff Richard
- B-side: "Mister Cloud"
- Released: 18 February 1972
- Recorded: 14 December 1971
- Studio: EMI Studios, London
- Genre: Christian rock; contemporary Christian
- Length: 4:15
- Label: Columbia
- Songwriters: Michel Hamburger; Pierre Darjean
- Producer: Nick Ingman

Cliff Richard singles chronology
"Sing a Song of Freedom" (1971)	"Jesus" (1972)	"Living in Harmony" (1972)

=== Release ===
Richard released his version in February 1972 with the B-side "Mister Cloud" which was written by songwriting duo Guy Fletcher and Doug Flett. It was produced by Nick Ingman, credited on the record as 'An NP [Norrie Paramor] production by Nick Ingman'. Ingman also arranged the song and it features his orchestra.

Richard has said "I didn't record a gospel song for a long time after I became a Christian. And Jesus was the first one I did. I was convinced that it would be wrong for me just to record a single – religious sort of gospel content single – just because I was a Christian. And I wanted very much to be sure that it was a good song. And I waited a long time for that particular song, Jesus. But when it came, I instantly knew I had to record that one. We spent a bit time on it too, of course, and did a, you know, did some phasing on it and gave it some effect. And I must say, I was really quite pleased with the recording".

However, after it failed to be particularly successful, Richard said that "somehow it seems very difficult for people to accept me with a gospel single. Everybody else can make them but somehow whenever I do, the motive or intention is held suspect. A number of BBC producers would not play Jesus because of the title although they are perfectly prepared to plug a Hari Krishna [sic] or Maharishi inspired song".

=== Track listing ===
7": Columbia / DB 8864

1. "Jesus" – 4:15
2. "Mister Cloud" – 3:45

=== Charts ===
Chart (1972)	Peak position
Canada Top Singles (RPM)	58
Hong Kong (Radio Hong Kong)	1
UK Singles (Official Charts)	35
