= Sincerely (Cliff Richard album) =

1969 studio album by Cliff Richard

Studio album by Cliff Richard
- Released: September 1969
- Recorded: September 1966 – April 1969
- Studio: EMI Abbey Road
- Genre: Pop
- Label: Columbia - SCX 6357
- Producer: Norrie Paramor

Cliff Richard chronology
Two a Penny (1968)	Sincerely (1969)	Tracks 'n Grooves (1970)

Sincerely was the 14th studio album by Cliff Richard, released in 1969. It is his 26th album overall.

The album reached number 24 in the UK Albums Chart, in a three-week run in the top 40.

== Track listing ==
1. "In the Past" (Mick Cahill)
2. "Always" (Terry Britten)
3. "Will You Love Me Tomorrow" (Carole King, Gerry Goffin)
4. "You'll Want Me" (Roger Cook, Roger Greenaway)
5. "I'm Not Getting Married" (Albert Hammond, Mike Hazlewood)
6. "Time" (Michael Merchant)
7. "For Emily, Whenever I May Find Her" (Paul Simon)
8. "Baby I Could Be So Good At Loving You" (Buzz Clifford)
9. "Sam" (Mitch Murray, Peter Callander)
10. "London's Not Too Far" (Hank Marvin)
11. "Take Action" (Terry Britten)
12. "Take Good Care of Her" (Arthur Kent, Ed Warren)
13. "When I Find You"" (Jimmy Campbell)
14. "Punch and Judy" (Mike d'Abo)

== Personnel ==
Taken from the sleeve notes, as follows:

- Mike Leander - arranger and conductor, tracks 1, 2, 7, 8, 10, 14
- Brian Bennett - arranger, track 3; arranger and conductor, tracks 4, 11
- Mike Vickers - arranger and conductor, tracks 5, 13
- Bernard Ebbinghouse - arranger and conductor, tracks 6
- Alan Hawkshaw - arranger and conductor, tracks 9, 12
- Norrie Paramor - conductor, track 3; producer
- Cliff Richard - lead vocals
