= Living in Harmony (song) =

1972 single by Cliff Richard

- Cover of the single released in Germany

Single by Cliff Richard
- B-side: "Empty Chairs"
- Released: 28 July 1972
- Recorded: 4 July 1972
- Studio: EMI Studios, London
- Genre: Pop
- Length: 3:21
- Label: Columbia
- Songwriters: Alan Tarney; Trevor Spencer
- Producer: Norrie Paramor

Cliff Richard singles chronology
"Jesus" (1972)	"Living in Harmony" (1972)	"A Brand New Song" (1972)

"Living in Harmony" is a song by British singer Cliff Richard, released as a single in July 1972. It peaked at number 12 on the UK Singles Chart.

== Release ==
"Living in Harmony" was written by songwriting duo Alan Tarney and Trevor Spencer. Tarney would go on to write as well as produce numerous songs for Richard. It was released as single with the B-side "Empty Chairs", a song written by Don Mclean for his album American Pie. Both tracks were arranged by and feature the orchestra of Nick Ingman. Richard has described "Living in Harmony" as being "the end of times", as it was the last single of Richard's to be produced by Norrie Paramor (he did also produce "An Old Accordion", the B-side to the follow-up single "A Brand New Song").

It was first recorded by Olivia Newton-John for her second album Olivia, released in August 1972. Richard had heard her version and said to manager Peter Gormley, "It's a fabulous song, but I don't like the arrangement very much" and that "somehow or another, it seems to me a commercial song but it doesn't sound commercial". So, Richard has said, "we really worked on making it commercial. And in essence it was commercial, but I think somehow – I don't know what they did to their session, but it was too fast and everything. And we really got down and I think we came up – I mean, with all love, Olivia – I think we did a better version of it".

== Track listing ==
7": Columbia / DB 8917

1. "Living in Harmony" – 3:21
2. "Empty Chairs" – 3:24

== Personnel ==
- Cliff Richard – vocals, backing vocals
- The Breakaways – backing vocals
- Nick Ingman Orchestra – all instrumentation

== Charts ==
Chart (1972)	Peak position
Hong Kong (Radio Hong Kong)	4
Ireland (IRMA)	10
Malaysia (Rediffusion)	8
South Africa (Springbok Radio)	18
Thailand (Radio HSA)	2
UK Singles (Official Charts)	12
