= Good Times (Better Times) =

1969 single by Cliff Richard

- Cover of the single released in Germany

Single by Cliff Richard
- B-side: "Occasional Rain"
- Released: 21 February 1969
- Recorded: 31 January 1969
- Studio: IBC Studios, London
- Genre: Pop
- Length: 2:16
- Label: Columbia
- Songwriters: Jerry Lordan; Roger Cook; Roger Greenaway
- Producer: Norrie Paramor

Cliff Richard singles chronology
| "Don't Forget to Catch Me" (1968) | "Good Times (Better Times)" (1969) | "Big Ship" (1969) |

"Good Times (Better Times)" is a song by Cliff Richard, released as a single in February 1969. It peaked at number 12 on the UK Singles Chart.

== Reception ==
Reviewing for New Musical Express, Derek Johnson described "Good Times (Better Times)" as "a happy light-hearted and immensely danceable disc", "with a walloping bass drum, dancing strings, organ, backing brass and vocal riff chanting".

== Track listing ==
1. "Good Times (Better Times)" – 2:16
2. "Occasional Rain" – 2:44

== Personnel ==
- Cliff Richard – vocals
- Mike Vickers Orchestra – orchestra and all instrumentation

== Charts ==
| Chart (1969) | Peak position |
|---|---|
| Australia (Go-Set) | 38 |
| Australia (Kent Music Report) | 46 |
| Austria (Podium) | 11 |
| Belgium (Ultratop 50 Flanders) | 8 |
| Belgium (Ultratop 50 Wallonia) | 28 |
| Finland (Suomen virallinen lista) | 14 |
| Germany (GfK) | 37 |
| Ireland (IRMA) | 9 |
| Netherlands (Dutch Top 40) | 9 |
| Netherlands (Single Top 100) | 12 |
| New Zealand (Listener) | 20 |
| Rhodesia (Lyons Maid) | 11 |
| South Africa (Springbok Radio) | 17 |
| Sweden (Kvällstoppen) | 17 |
| UK Singles (Official Charts) | 12 |
