= Onyx (Cornish band) =

Cornish psychedelic rock band

- Also known as: The Onyx, Salamander
- Origin: Wadebridge, Cornwall, England
- Genre: Psychedelic rock
- Years active: 1965–1971
- Labels: Pye, CBS, Parlophone
- Past members: Al Hodge; Tony Priest; Dick Bland; Steve Cotton; Roger Dell
- Website: the-onyx.co.uk

A rare Spanish picture sleeve of Onyx's 1971 single, a cover version of the Crosby, Stills, and Nash song "Our House" with the B-side "Air"

The Onyx or Onyx were an English psychedelic rock band formed in Wadebridge, Cornwall, England in 1965. Descended from a band called Rick & The Hayseeds, the group came to be known as The Onyx Set, named after an Onyx ring owned by original band member Mike Black-Borow. After various changes in the line-up they shortened their name to The Onyx and the classic line-up was formed. The band members were guitarist Al Hodge, who had previously played with various local bands such as The Buccaneers and The Fabulous Jaguars, vocalist Tony Priest, bassist Dick Bland, keyboard player Steve Cotton and drummer Roger Dell.

The band evolved from doing cover versions of popular contemporary beat bands in their early days to psychedelia. They were known for their intricate five-part harmonies. During the late 1960s they were a popular live attraction, focusing most of their gigging activity in Bristol and South Wales, as well as touring throughout the UK and making trips to Germany. They also featured on numerous Radio One sessions, resulting in the band being one of the most played bands on BBC Radio at the time. They also featured heavily on radio stations in Europe.

They released a total of seven singles, one of which was released under the pseudonym. Salamander. Oddly, it had been hoped that a change in the band's name would help distance them from their BBC Radio One work and increase record sales. Most of the A sides of the singles were written by Guy Fletcher and Doug Flett with the B sides credited to the members of the band. They are also credited as the writers on the single. "Climb That Tree", which was recorded by The She Trinity in 1970, in addition to writing "I'm Going Down" for Mike Raynor & Sky.

Hodge left the band in late 1970 to get married and return to Cornwall, leaving just prior to the release of "Our House". The band continued as The Onyx with a new guitarist, Bernie Lee from Paper Blitz Tissue and Orange Bicycle, releasing one final single "The Next Stop Is Mine".

Under the guidance of Jerry Lordan, the band emerged shortly afterwards as Vineyard, releasing two singles on Decca and Deram. Original drummer Dell left the band to be replaced by Herman Rarebell (later of Scorpions). Vineyard recorded a number of tracks for a possible LP release, but with poor singles sales these tracks remained unreleased. The band finally disbanded in 1975.

Bland went on to work with Joe Brown, Shakin' Stevens and Cliff Richard

The band featured on the Bam Caruso's Rubble collection in the early 1980s, as well as numerous other compilations. In 2009, Wooden Hill released a collection of previously unreleased studio demos recorded in late 1967 titled Kaleidoscope of Colours - The Onyx Demo Sessions 1967.

== Discography ==
- "You've Gotta Be with Me" / "It's All Put On" (Pye 7N 17477) 1968
- "My Son John" / "Step by Step" (Pye 7N 17622) 1968
- "Tamaris Khan" / "So Sad Inside" (Pye 7N 17668) 1968
- "Time Off" / "Movin' In" (CBS 4635) 1969
- "Crystal Ball" / "Billy" (CBS 5102) 1970 (as Salamander)
- "Our House" / "Air" (Parlophone R 5888) 1971
- "The Next Stop Is Mine" / "What's That You Say" (Parlophone R 5906) 1971

Previously unreleased demo sessions

- Kaleidoscope of Colours - The Onyx Demo Sessions 1967 (Wooden Hill WH 027CD) 2009

As Vineyard

- "Ghost Train (Here It Come Again)" / "Unicorns and Minotaurs" (Decca F 13518) 1974
- "Charlemaine" / "Myla" (Deram DM 420) 1974
