= The Joy of Living (song) =

1970 single by Cliff Richard and Hank Marvin

- Cover of the single released in Germany

Single by Cliff Richard and Hank Marvin
- B-side: "Leave My Woman Alone" "Boogitoo"
- Released: 6 February 1970
- Recorded: 7 January 1970
- Studio: Advision Studios, London
- Genre: Pop rock
- Length: 3:04
- Label: Columbia
- Songwriter(s): Hank Marvin; Paul Ferris
- Producer(s): Norrie Paramor

Cliff Richard singles chronology
"With the Eyes of a Child" (1969)	"The Joy of Living" (1970)	"Goodbye Sam, Hello Samantha" (1970)

Hank Marvin singles chronology
"Throw Down a Line" (1969)	"The Joy of Living" (1970)	"Break Another Dawn" (1970)

"The Joy of Living" is a song by British singers Cliff Richard and Hank Marvin released as a single in February 1970. It peaked at number 25 on the UK Singles Chart.

== Release and reception ==
"The Joy of Living" was Richard's second single with Marvin, excluding their work with the Shadows, with the first, "Throw Down a Line", released the previous year. It was written by Marvin and Paul Ferris, the latter of whom had previously written "Visions" for Richard. It was released as a single with two B-sides. The first, "Leave My Woman Alone", written and originally recorded by Ray Charles, was sung only by Richard. The second, "Boogitoo", was written by Marvin and Richard Anthony Hewson and was sung only by Marvin.

The song has been described as "a cynical look at the modern age, where Britain is in danger of being turned into one huge motorway". Richard has said that "the 'multicoloured crocodile' was the car, killing the trees and poisoning the air. I mean! It was kind of the first stages of the green movement, wasn't it? I said [to Hank] I'd love to sing something like that. So we were trying to make a point."

Reviewing for Record Mirror, Peter Jones described "The Joy of Living" as "super-gentle, vocally, but not for long. Beautiful crisp Marvin guitar spasms, full chorus, and a sort of Gospel build-up. Do listen to the lyrics, which are thoughtfully strong. Actually, a darned good and repetitive pop record."

== Track listing ==
7": Columbia / DB 8657

1. "The Joy of Living" – 3:04
2. "Leave My Woman Alone" – 2:57
3. "Boogitoo" – 2:49

== Charts ==
Chart (1970)	Peak position
Australia (Kent Music Report)	71
UK Singles (OCC)	25
