= Big Ship (Cliff Richard song) =

1969 single by Cliff Richard

- Cover of the single released in the Netherlands

Single by Cliff Richard
- B-side: "She's Leaving You"
- Released: 23 May 1969
- Recorded: 22 April 1969
- Studio: EMI Studios, London
- Genre: Pop
- Length: 2:26
- Label: Columbia
- Songwriter: Raymond Froggatt
- Producer: Norrie Paramor

Cliff Richard singles chronology
| "Good Times (Better Times)" (1969) | "Big Ship" (1969) | "Early in the Morning" (1969) |

"Big Ship" is a song by Cliff Richard, released as a single in May 1969. It peaked at number 8 on the UK Singles Chart.

== Background and release ==
"Big Ship" was written by Raymond Froggatt and was close to being selected as Lulu's entry for the 1969 Eurovision Song Contest. However, it was rejected in favour of "Boom Bang-a-Bang". In January 1969, record producer Mickie Most wrote in Melody Maker that "Big Ship" was "a number one record ... not just here but all over the world" and was "strongly in line for a future record" by Herman's Hermits. The band did record the song but it remained unreleased until its inclusion on the box set Into Something Good: The Mickie Most Years 1964–72.

Cliff Richard's manager Peter Gormley heard about the song and given the success of Richard's Eurovision song "Congratulations" the year before decided to get him to record a version. It was recorded with the Mike Vickers Orchestra, who performed all instrumentation on the track. "Big Ship" was released as a single with the B-side "She's Leaving You", written by the Shadows' drummer Brian Bennett, who also conducted the orchestra that backs the song.

== Reception ==
Reviewing for Record Mirror, Peter Jones wrote that "the chorus, with organ and voices added, is dead commercial, and Cliff fills in the verses with his usual warmth and clarity. There Is a shanty-ish sort of feel to it and some excellent brass figures behind. Not his best, but better than most". For New Musical Express, Derek Johnson described the song as having a "breezy air of light-hearted gaiety and vitality. Set to a rollicking nautical-flavoured score, with a vocal group joining in the chorus, it's a happy-go-lucky ditty in much the same mould as "Good Times"".

== Track listing ==
1. "Big Ship" – 2:26
2. "She's Leaving You" – 3:28

== Charts ==
| Chart (1969) | Peak position |
|---|---|
| Australia (Go-Set) | 29 |
| Australia (Kent Music Report) | 38 |
| Belgium (Ultratop 50 Flanders) | 13 |
| Belgium (Ultratop 50 Wallonia) | 45 |
| Denmark (IFPI) | 7 |
| Ireland (IRMA) | 8 |
| Singapore (Radio Singapore) | 1 |
| UK Singles (OCC) | 8 |
