= DATA (band) =

English synthpop band

- Origin: London, England
- Genre: Synthpop
- Years active: 1980–2009, 2015-Present
- Labels: Polydor, Illuminated, Virgin, Sire/Warner Bros., Proto, Eternity
- Past members: Georg Kajanus; Francesca "Frankie" Boulter; Phillipa "Phil" Boulter

DATA was an electronic music band created in 1980 by Georg Kajanus, creator of such bands as Eclection, Sailor and Noir (with Tim Dry of the robotic/music duo Tik and Tok). After the break-up of Sailor in the late 1970s, Kajanus decided to experiment with electronic music and formed DATA, together with vocalists Francesca ("Frankie") and Phillipa ("Phil") Boulter, daughters of British singer John Boulter.

The classically orientated title track of DATA’s first album, Opera Electronica, was used as the theme music to the short film, Towers of Babel (1981), which was directed by Jonathan Lewis (director). Jonathan Lewis and starred Anna Quayle and Ken Campbell. Towers of Babel was nominated for a BAFTA award in 1982 and won the Silver Hugo Award for Best Short Film at the Chicago International Film Festival of the same year.

DATA released two more albums, the experimental 2-Time (1983) and the Country & Western-inspired electronica album Elegant Machinery (1985). The title of the last album was the inspiration for the name of Swedish pop synth group, elegant MACHINERY, formerly known as Pole Position.

In 1995, Accumulator was released, a compilation album containing the complete albums 2-Time and Elegant Machinery, and the track "Fallout" from Opera Electronica.

== Discography ==
=== Studio albums ===
- Opera Electronica (1981)
- 2-Time (1983)
- Elegant Machinery (1985)
- Accumulator (1995, compilation album)

=== Singles ===
- Over 21

・"Fallout" b/w "Politics" (1980 & 1981)

- "Fever of Love" b/w "Talk" (1981)
- "Cuckooland" b/w "Talk" (1981)
- "Star" b/w "Talk" (1981)
- "Living inside Me" b/w "A-O (No Bungalow)", "Data Plata" (1983)
- "Stop" b/w "Blow" (1985)
- "Blow" b/w "Blow", "D.J." (1985)
- "Blow", "Fallout" b/w (1985)
- "Ricocheted Love" b/w "In Blue", "D.J." (1986)
