= Georg Kajanus =

Norwegian composer and pop musician (born 1946)

- Born: Georg Johan Tjegodiev Kajanus; 9 February 1946 (age 80); Trondheim, Norway
- Origin: London, England
- Genres: Folk, pop, electronic
- Instruments: Guitar, synth keyboards, vocals
- Years active: 1960s–present
- Formerly of: Eclection, Sailor, DATA

Georg Johan Tjegodiev Kajanus (also Tchegodaieff; born 9 February 1946) is a Norwegian composer and pop musician based in the United Kingdom, best known as the lead singer and songwriter of the British pop group Sailor.

== Early years ==
Kajanus was born on 9 February 1946, in Trondheim, Norway, to Prince Pavel [also Paulo] Tjegodiev of Russia and Johanna Kajanus, a French-Finnish sculptor, bronze medal winner for sculpture at the Exposition Internationale des Arts et Techniques dans la Vie Moderne (1937), and granddaughter of Robert Kajanus, the Finnish composer, conductor, champion of Sibelius and founder of the Helsinki Philharmonic Orchestra. He is the brother of the late actress and film-maker Eva Norvind and the uncle to Mexican theatre and television actress Nailea Norvind.

Kajanus moved with his mother and sister to Paris at the age of twelve where he studied music and classical guitar, as well as attending the Cité Universitaire’s flying school. The family then relocated to Montreal, Quebec, Canada, where Kajanus worked as a stained-glass window designer.

== Career ==
=== Early musical career ===
After arriving in London in 1967, Kajanus was a member of UK-based folk rock band Eclection, who released a self-titled album in 1968 and wrote Cliff Richard's single "Flying Machine" (1971).

Kajanus and Phil Pickett, who had been acquainted for some time, collaborated on an album, Hi Ho Silver! (1972), as Kajanus/Pickett. Deciding to form a group, tentatively named KP Packet, Kajanus and Pickett enlisted drummer and percussionist Grant Serpell (Affinity), and keyboard player and guitarist Henry Marsh (Gringo). In 1973, the foursome made their first recordings in a small studio in North London. Most of this material was not released at the time, but three demos are featured in Sailor's Buried Treasure 2-CD box set (2006).

Kajanus moved to Mexico City, Mexico and for three years lived in seclusion before returning to London in 1973.

=== Sailor ===
Kajanus had developed a musical theatre concept, Red Light Review, based on his memories of being a young man in places like Pigalle in Paris's red-light district. Encouraged by Grant Serpell to rework this material as pop songs, Kajanus devised the concept for Sailor.

Sailor signed to Epic Records-CBS Records and between 1974 and 1978 released five albums with Kajanus: Sailor, Trouble, The Third Step, Checkpoint (without Pickett) and Hideaway. Kajanus was the lead singer, guitarist and, for the first three albums, the sole songwriter for the band, penning its two major hits, "A Glass of Champagne" and "Girls, Girls, Girls". Kajanus then left Sailor, leaving Pickett as the creative force behind their next album, Dressed for Drowning.

Kajanus designed an instrument used in the band called the "Nickelodeon", a large wooden frame consisting of two upright pianos, two synthesizers, mini organs and glockenspiels, that allowed the group to perform their acoustic arrangements correctly on stage. On stage, Kajanus played the piano on one side and Henry Marsh played the keys on the other side.

=== Later projects ===
After leaving Sailor in 1978, Kajanus began to experiment with electronic music, forming DATA with Frankie and Phil Boulter. Georg later worked with the Japanese composer and musician Shigeru Umebayashi, co-writing and producing songs for his album, Ume (1988).

In 1989, Kajanus reunited with Henry Marsh and Phil Pickett to write and record some new material. This was not released at the time, but three songs are featured in Sailor's Buried Treasure 2-CD box set (2006).

Kajanus, Marsh, Pickett and Grant Serpell reformed Sailor in 1990. The group recorded two albums, Sailor (1991) and Street Lamp (1992), with Kajanus once again writing and arranging all the material. They achieved further chart success in continental Europe with singles such as "La Cumbia" and "The Secretary".

In the late nineties, Kajanus formed the "poetic-techno" duo Noir with Tim Dry (previously of Tik and Tok). Noir’s single "Walking" was used extensively in the 1997 Channel 4 television series Feast, an avant-garde culinary program directed by TV food maestro David Pritchard. Feast was hosted by Noir and also starred French TV chef Jean Christophe Novelli.

Noir's album Strange Desire, recorded in 1995, was eventually released on Angel Air Records in 2007. In 2008, Kajanus began working with Roberto Trippini and Barbie Wilde on a new version of the Sailor musical - an update of his original Red Light Review concept - which he describes as "a bittersweet musical about two people searching for love in the ruins of post-War Marseille".

Kajanus's other current musical project is People Industry, which he describes as "an exuberant, musical exploration of the human journey."
