= A Glass of Champagne =

1975 song by Sailor

Single by Sailor
- A-side: "A Glass of Champagne"
- B-side: "Panama"
- Released: December 1975
- Genre: Glam rock, pop
- Length: 2:40
- Label: Epic
- Songwriter: Georg Kajanus
- Producers: Jeffrey Lesser, Rupert Holmes

Sailor singles chronology
"Sailor" (1975)	"A Glass of Champagne" (1975)	"Girls, Girls, Girls" (1976)

"A Glass of Champagne" is a song written by Georg Kajanus. A recording of the song by the band Sailor, of which Kajanus was a member, was released in December 1975 and reached number 2 in the UK in January 1976. The single was produced by Jeffrey Lesser and Rupert Holmes.

== Reception ==
Only "Bohemian Rhapsody" by Queen prevented "A Glass of Champagne" reaching the top of the UK Singles Chart in January 1976. The song reached number one in Ireland, as well as number three in Germany, the Netherlands top 100 and Switzerland, number four in Australia, number five in the Netherlands top 40, number eight in Austria and Norway, number eleven in Belgium, number fifteen in Sweden, and number twenty-three in Finland.

== Charts ==
Chart	Peak position
Australia Kent Music Report	4
Austria Ö3 Austria Top 40	8
Belgium Ultrapop	11
Finland Official Finnish Charts	23
Germany GfK Entertainment charts	3
Ireland Singles Chart	1
Netherlands Dutch Single Top 100	3
Netherlands Dutch Top 40	5
Norway VG-lista	8
Sweden Sverigetopplistan	15
Switzerland Swiss Hitparade	3
UK Official Singles Chart	2
