= Two a Penny =

1968 British film by James F. Collier

- Directed by: James F. Collier
- Written by: Stella Linden (original story and screenplay)
- Produced by: Frank R. Jacobson
- Starring: Cliff Richard; Ann Holloway; Dora Bryan; Avril Angers; Geoffrey Bayldon; Peter Barkworth; Mona Washbourne; Earl Cameron; Charles Lloyd-Pack; Billy Graham
- Cinematography: Michael Reed
- Edited by: Ann Chegwidden; Eugene Pendleton
- Music by: Mike Leander; Cliff Richard
- Distributed by: World Wide Pictures
- Release date: 1968
- Running time: 98 min
- Country: United Kingdom
- Language: English

Two a Penny is a 1967 British film, released nationally in 1968, directed by James F. Collier and starring Cliff Richard. It was produced by Frank R. Jacobson for Billy Graham's film distribution and production company World Wide Pictures The original story and screenplay was by Stella Linden.

== Plot ==
Jamie Hopkins is an art student and frustrated pop star who lives with his mother. She works as a receptionist for Dr. Berman, a psychiatrist who is experimenting with psychedelic drugs. Jamie wants to make money quickly, and begins to work at the doctor's office as a pretence in order to steal drugs.

When his girlfriend Carol is converted to Christianity while attending a crusade led by evangelist Billy Graham, she attempts to show him the error of his ways. Soon after, Jamie is caught stealing from Dr. Berman's drug supply, and attempting to double-cross drug dealer Alec Fitch.

Initially hostile toward his girlfriend's newfound faith, Jamie eventually accepts it.

== Cast ==
- Cliff Richard as Jamie Hopkins
- Dora Bryan as Ruby Hopkins
- Ann Holloway as Carol Turner
- Avril Angers as Mrs. Burry
- Geoffrey Bayldon as Alec Fitch
- Peter Barkworth as vicar
- Donald Bisset as Dr. Berman
- Edward Evans as Jenkins
- Mona Washbourne as Mrs. Duckett
- Tina Packer as Gladys
- Earl Cameron as verger
- Noel Davis as Dennis Lancaster
- Nigel Goodwin as Hubert
- Charles Lloyd-Pack as Reverend Allison
- Billy Graham as himself

== Production ==
Billy Graham was filmed at his "London Crusade" in 1967.

== Reception ==
The Monthly Film Bulletin wrote: "A naive piece of propaganda which makes its intentions clear from the start by introducing us to wicked Jamie as he borrows money from his girl in the symbolically looming shadow of a church. His subsequent progress from degradation to salvation moves unerringly from cliché to cliché, none more mawkishly embarrassing than the one in which poor abandoned Carol, stammering out a line or two of "The Lord's Prayer" in a churchyard at night, is rewarded by the prompt appearance of Cliff Richard with a comforting song on his lips. Avril Angers manages a few tart exchanges as a lecherous landlady with fond memories of wartime gaieties with ENSA; otherwise the general air of Sunday School homily is unrelieved."

Kine Weekly wrote: "A sincere, good film, this is also remarkably entertaining and free from religious cant. ... The picture is a religious tract but it has been so intelligently conceived and written, and it is so sincerely and professionally acted by its principal, that it can qualify as entertaining in most situations. Except for one or two moments, the script avoids the kind of sentimentality that so often presents religious sincerity as a kind of mawkish mush."

The Radio Times Guide to Films gave the film 3/5 stars, writing: "It is a surprisingly well-balanced offering both pro and con viewpoints and contains some fine performances from Dora Bryan, Avril Angers and other well-known character actors of the time. The obstacle is Cliff himself, who was already a popular family entertainer but is awkwardly miscast as a hoodlum who would rather push drugs than marry his Bible-thumping girlfriend. Today, of course, the film has considerable curiosity value."

Leslie Halliwell called the film "a curiosity".

== Soundtrack ==
Two a Penny

Soundtrack album by Cliff Richard
- Released: August 1968
- Recorded: Jun–Oct 1967, May 1968
- Studio: EMI Abbey Road
- Label: Columbia Columbia SCX 6262
- Producer: Norrie Paramor

Cliff Richard chronology
Don't Stop Me Now! (1967)	Two a Penny (1968)	Sincerely (1969)

Singles from Two a Penny
- 1. "I'll Love You Forever Today" Released: 21 June 1968

The soundtrack album Two a Penny by Cliff Richard was released in August 1968. It was his fifth film soundtrack and his twenty-third album overall. Accompaniment is credited to the Mike Leander Orchestra and production to Norrie Paramor.

Track listing:
Side A:

1. Two A Penny (2:44)
2. "I'll Love You Forever Today" (3:08)
3. "Questions" (2:53)
4. "Long Is The Night" (instrumental) (2:32)
5. "Lonely Girl" (3:09)
6. "And Me (I'm On The Outside Now)" (3:02)
7. "Daybreak" (instrumental) (2:20)

Side B:

1. "Twist and Shout" (2:39)
2. "Celeste" (instrumental) (2:47)
3. "Wake Up Wake Up" (2:37)
4. "Cloudy" (2:19)
5. "Red Rubber Ball" (2:07)
6. "Close to Kathy" (2:57)
7. "Rattler" (2:52)
