= Throw Down a Line =

1969 single by Cliff Richard and Hank Marvin

- Cover of the single released in the Netherlands

Single by Cliff Richard and Hank Marvin
- B-side: "Reflections"
- Released: 5 September 1969
- Recorded: 2 May 1969
- Studio: EMI Studios, London
- Genre: Pop rock
- Length: 2:49
- Label: Columbia
- Songwriter: Hank Marvin
- Producer: Norrie Paramor

Cliff Richard singles chronology
"Early in the Morning" (1969)	"Throw Down a Line" (1969)	"With the Eyes of a Child" (1969)

Hank Marvin singles chronology
"Sacha" (1969)	"Throw Down a Line" (1969)	"The Joy of Living" (1970)

"Throw Down a Line" is a song by Cliff Richard and Hank Marvin, released as a single in September 1969. It peaked at number 7 on the UK Singles Chart.

== Background and release ==
"Throw Down a Line" was written by Hank Marvin, guitarist for the Shadows, who had temporarily split up. He recalled that he wrote it "with Jimi Hendrix in mind. I had a Vox drum box – all I could get out of it was 'gong-CLOCK-gong-CLOCK'. Anyway, I couldn't get it to Hendrix. Mickie Most took it to Jeff Beck and Rod Stewart. Then Cliff heard an acetate and said 'Why didn't you play it to me first?'". The Jeff Beck Group did record a version of "Throw Down the Line" in February 1969, but it wasn't included on the band's album Beck-Ola as Most didn't think it would be a hit. It remained unreleased until its inclusion as a bonus track on the 2004 reissue of Beck-Ola.

Richard and Marvin recorded their version in May 1969, with Richard singing the lead vocals, Marvin singing the vocal harmonies and playing guitar and it was backed by the Mike Vickers Orchestra. It was released as a single with the B-side "Reflections", which was performed only by Richard and was written by Richard and Keith Craddock.

== Reception ==
Reviewing for Record Mirror, Peter Jones wrote "there's a strongly bluesy-soul, earnest -yearning sort of feel to it, and Cliff really tackles this "different" kind of song with immense style and verve. Excellent lyrics – kindly listen closely. And a lot of good guitar". For New Musical Express, Derek Johnson described the song as "very bluesy and moody" and wrote that "the lyric is intense, almost bitter – and Cliff handles it with greater emotion and sensitivity than I've ever heard him employ before".

== Track listing ==
1. "Throw Down a Line" – 2:49
2. "Reflections" – 2:56

== Charts ==
Chart (1969)	Peak position
Australia (Kent Music Report)	58
Belgium (Ultratop 50 Flanders)	12
Belgium (Ultratop 50 Wallonia)	22
Ireland (IRMA)	8
Japan (Oricon Singles Chart)	62
New Zealand (Listener)	15
South Africa (Springbok Radio)	19
UK Singles (OCC)	7
