= I'll Love You Forever Today =

1968 single by Cliff Richard

- Cover of the single released in the Netherlands

Single by Cliff Richard

from the album Two a Penny
- B-side: "Girl You'll Be a Woman Soon"
- Released: 21 June 1968
- Recorded: 1 July 1967
- Studio: EMI Studios, London
- Genre: Pop
- Length: 3:06
- Label: Columbia
- Songwriters: Cliff Richard; James Collier
- Producer: Norrie Paramor

Cliff Richard singles chronology
"Congratulations" (1968)	"I'll Love You Forever Today" (1968)	"Marianne" (1968)

"I'll Love You Forever Today" is a song by British singer Cliff Richard released as a single in June 1968. It peaked at number 27 on the UK Singles Chart.

== Release and reception ==
"I'll Love You Forever" was written for the film Two a Penny by its director James Collier and Cliff Richard who also stars in the film and sings the soundtrack album. The single was arranged by and features the orchestra of Mike Leander. It was released with the B-side "Girl You'll Be a Woman Soon", written and originally released by Neil Diamond in 1967. Richard also recorded a German-language version of "I'll Love You Forever", titled "Die Liebe ist immer nur heut'", for his album Hier ist Cliff.

Reviewing for Record Mirror, Peter Jones wrote that the song has a "splendid arrangement with splashes of brass and Cliff at his relaxed, warm, ballad best. It's gently done, with tinkling backing... really it has instant impact". However, Penny Valentine for Disc and Music Echo described it as "probably the most boring song Cliff's ever recorded", saying that "it would take a coal-heaver to do anything with this one –and he's certainly not that".

== Track listing ==
7": Columbia / DB 8437

1. "I'll Love You Forever Today" – 3:06
2. "Girl You'll Be a Woman Soon" – 3:03

== Personnel ==
- Cliff Richard – vocals
- Mike Leander Orchestra – all instrumentation

== Charts ==
Chart (1968)	Peak position
Australia (Kent Music Report)	67
Malaysia (Radio Malaysia)	1
UK Singles (OCC)	27
