= Marvin, Welch & Farrar =

British-Australian pop group (1970–1973)

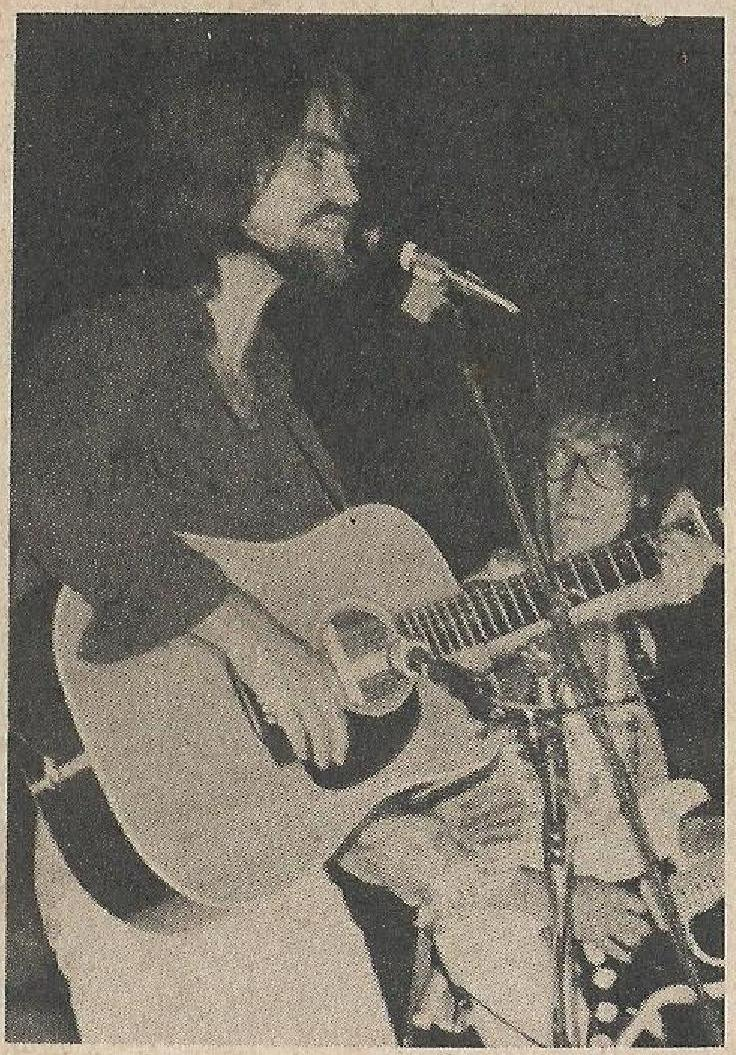
- John Farrar and Hank Marvin performing with the band in 1972

Background information
- Origin: London, England
- Genres: Rock
- Years active: 1970–1973
- Labels: Regal Zonophone, EMI
- Spinoff of: The Shadows; The Strangers
- Past members: John Farrar; Hank Marvin; Bruce Welch

Marvin, Welch & Farrar (a.k.a. MWF) were a 1970s British and Australian popular music group formed by Hank Marvin and Bruce Welch, both members of The Shadows – as a change of direction manoeuvre during 1970 to 1973 – and John Farrar (ex-The Strangers). The distinction was that while The Shadows were famous for their instrumental work, Marvin Welch & Farrar were a trio, vocal harmony group. They have been favourably compared to US folk close harmony group Crosby Stills Nash and Young (a.k.a. CSNY) and The Hollies.

Their second album, Second Opinion (1971), produced by Peter Vince, was voted one of the best ever sounding albums recorded at Abbey Road studios by EMI Records' sound engineers in a private poll during the 1970s.

== History ==
Marvin, Welch & Farrar was formed in London in July 1970 and comprised Hank Marvin on lead vocals and lead guitar; Bruce Welch on lead vocals and rhythm guitar; and John Farrar on lead vocals and guitar (both lead and rhythm). Reports were appearing in the United Kingdom music press by August that Marvin and Welch of The Shadows were forming a new group.

Marvin later recalled, "I thought at the time that, as the Shadows weren't working regularly, it would be nice to do something new – singing rather than instrumental, though with instrumentals as well, of course. I was talking to Bruce about it and I thought about forming a five-piece. He wasn't keen on a big group so we shelved the idea and started writing songs together. He suggested the two of us should record the songs together. I suggested adding one more person – I wanted the extra strength of a third voice and the scope it would offer".

The third member of the new group was then-unknown on the British 'pop' music scene: Farrar was a member of Australian group, The Strangers, which in 1968 had shared a bill with The Shadows. Welch had watched them from the wings of the theatre and was impressed by the young singer-guitarist: Farrar used a coke bottle to provide a slide guitar effect. When Olivia Newton-John reminded Welch and Marvin about Farrar – who was by then married to Pat Carroll, Newton-John's ex-singing partner – the duo invited him to send over some tapes, and then to join them.

Farrar remembered "Bruce had tried to phone me earlier and had left a message at my mother's house. I had been out working, and had gone home with my wife and we were both fast asleep around 1.30 am when the 'phone rang. When I picked up the 'phone and Bruce told me what he was planning, I couldn't believe it. Pat wanted me to drop everything and fly to London on the next plane, but I was desperately planning to be cool... Pat and I didn't go back to bed until the following morning. We spent the whole night smoking cigarettes, drinking cups of coffee and talking... I was trying so hard to be cool, but if the truth be known I wanted to get on the next plane, too".

The Strangers had been formed in 1961, and when founder, Laurie Arthur, decided to leave in early 1964, he was replaced by then 18-year-old Farrar. In 1968 they were a support act for The Shadows' appearance at the Menzies Hotel in Melbourne. The Strangers visited Vietnam in 1970 to play for Australian and United States troops, and Farrar spent some time in the US studying recording techniques in West Coast studios. Then came the invitation to join Marvin and Welch in London. Three months after the phone call from Welch, Farrar and Carroll were in London and Marvin, Welch and Farrar had begun rehearsing. Welch related "Originally, we planned just to record. But the enormity of John's move across the world and the good reception our album received changed that".

A 13-week Cliff Richard BBC TV series began in January 1971, and Marvin, Welch and Farrar appeared in five of the shows. It was also announced that the new group would be participating in Richard's European tour, scheduled for later that year. They would be billed as 'The Shadows – featuring Marvin, Welch and Farrar'. This was apparently for the benefit of audiences on the continent, who might be less familiar with the new vocal group. The Brian Bennett Orchestra would be accompanied Richard's set and both Welch and The Shadows bass guitarist, John Rostill, were to play in The Shadows/Marvin, Welch and Farrar set. In fact session bassist Dave Richmond – who had played on the Marvin, Welch and Farrar debut album – replaced Rostill for the tour. The Marvin, Welch and Farrar element in the show was confined to three numbers out of ten.

Although the two ex-Shadows were anxious to emphasise their commitment to the new venture, the public were not so sure. Despite an almost total lack of concert and record appearances, the Shadows were voted Top Instrumental Group in the 1971 New Musical Express poll. Live appearances by the new trio still brought demands from the audience for old Shadows numbers. During 1971 and 1972 Marvin Welch & Farrar performed live sessions at the BBC for Radio 1 broadcasting on the Dave Lee Travis Show.

Marvin mused "we lost out both ways. We lost out on the old Shadows, and we lost out by not getting through to the people we thought we'd get through to. They just wouldn't accept us". As musicians and songwriters, the group were well respected. Richard felt "The music was good. Excellent in fact. The engineers and EMI who produced all the Beatles things voted 'Second Opinion' the best album to come out of the company".

Second Opinion, the trio's second LP, was released in the US on the Sire label, which later released albums by artists such as the Ramones. Marvin, Welch and Farrar records, although well received, did not set the charts alight. The group remained unconcerned, working in the studios or on tour. At other times, they were individually or collectively writing songs, some of which were recorded by Richard or Newton-John as well as by the trio. Farrar and Welch were arranging and producing Newton-John's recordings, until she broke off her engagement to the latter, after which Farrar alone became responsible for her recording career.

By 1972, however, Welch had dropped out of the trio. The group had not lived up to his expectations, and some sections of the music press were critical of the Richard-Shadows-Newton-John stable generally. Adverse criticisms, though, did not seem to affect the box-office, and the autumn 1971 Palladium season had been a great success. When Richard toured in 1972, it was Marvin and Farrar, with the assistance of Bennett who joined them. Also involved were ex-Shadow Alan Hawkshaw, Newton-John and Carroll. The Marvin-Farrar set mixed Shadows favourites with new material.

Marvin and Farrar recorded an LP as a duo with one track also featuring Welch, which was presumably originally recorded for a planned third Marvin, Welch and Farrar LP. The album track, "Music makes my day", features Newton-John playing a recorder as an accompaniment. Marvin, on reflection, was less than enthusiastic about that joint album: "it lacked something in direction. It was a bit like Frankenstein meets the Beach Boys".

The album, Hank Marvin and John Farrar, was also released in the US, on the Capitol label. Richard's second appearance in the Eurovision Song Contest was in 1973, and Farrar was a member of his backing group. When Richard toured Australia in the same year, Farrar was musical director for both the gospel and secular segments of the tour. Backing Richard were Farrar's former group, the Strangers, and the vocal accompaniment was provided by Pat Carroll Singers.

== MW&F gigs ==
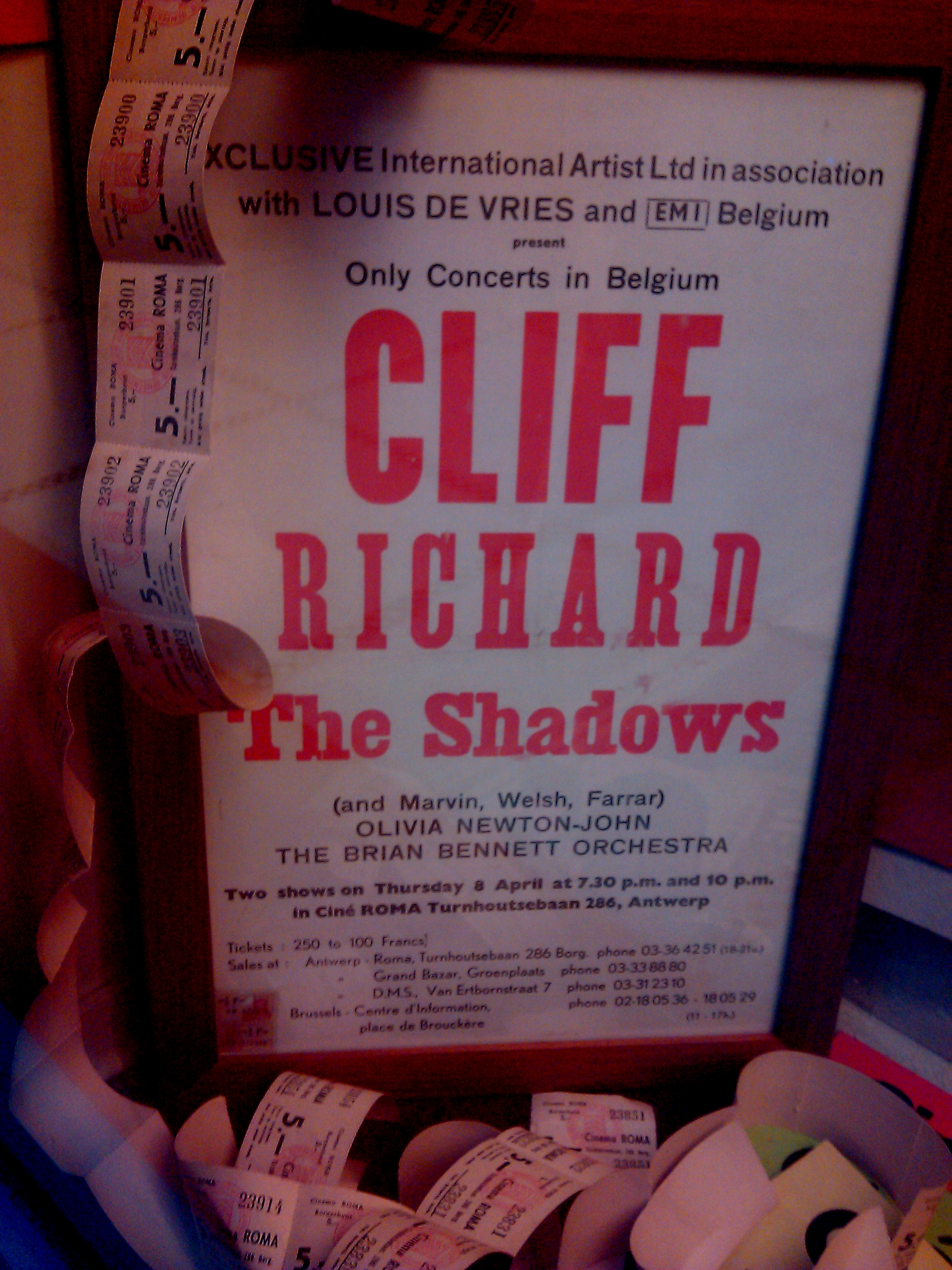
Flyer for a co-headlining 1971 Belgian gig

Stage appearances by Marvin, Welch and Farrar, and latterly by Marvin and Farrar, resulted in demands for 'old' Shadows numbers such as FBI and Apache etc. So in 1973, Marvin and Welch bowed to the inevitable and announced that the Shadows would come together once or twice a year for recording purposes only. Marvin and Farrar would still be working together, and would join with Welch and Bennett as the Shadows. The first LP by the new line-up was released in November 1973 as Rockin' with Curly Leads.

Almost all the tracks recorded by Marvin, Welch & Farrar were written by its core members, with occasional contributions from co-writers.

== Discography (MW&F) ==
Albums

- Live at the BBC – unissued, BBC copyright, various sessions – 1970–1972
- Marvin, Welch & Farrar – LP/CD – Regal Zonophone/See4Miles – 1971/1991
- Second Opinion – LP/CD – Regal Zonophone/See4Miles – 1971/1991
- Second Opinion – Quadraphonic LP – Regal Zonophone – 1972
- Step From The Shadows – LP/CD – See4Miles – 1986
- A Thousand Conversations – The Best of Marvin, Welch & Farrar – LP/CD – EMI – 1997
- Marvin, Welch & Farrar / Second Opinion (Remastered) – CD – BGO – 2006
- Cliff Richard 'Live' In Japan '72 – 2LP/8-CD boxset – Toshiba-EMI/EMI – 1973/2008
- 'Live' In Japan '72 – album by Cliff Richard, CD – EMI (in 2009) features M&F track "Backscratcher".
- Live at the Paris Olympia – album by the Shadows, CD – EMI (in 1992) features 10 songs from their MW&F era.
- Live at the Paris Olympia/'Live' In Japan – double album by the Shadows, 2CD – Magic Records of France (in 2002) features 10 songs from their MW&F era.

Singles

- Faithful / Mr. Sun – 7" – Regal Zonophone RZ 3030 – 22 January 1971
- Lady of the Morning / Tiny Robin – 7" – Regal Zonophone RZ 3035 – 28 May 1971
- Marmaduke / Strike A Light – 7" – Regal Zonophone RZ 3048 – 17 March 1972
- Faithful / Brownie Kentucky – 7" – Regal Zonophone RZ.701 [New Zealand] – 1971

== Discography (M&F) ==
Albums

- Hank Marvin & John Farrar – LP/CD – EMI/See4Miles – 1973/1991
- Hank Marvin & John Farrar (Remastered) – CD – BGO – 2007

Singles

- Music Makes My Day / Skin Deep – 7" – EMI – EMI 2044 – 20 July 1973
- Small And Lonely Light / Galadriel (Spirit of Starlight) – 7" – EMI – EMI 2335 – 22 August 1975

== Guitars used by MW&F/M&F ==
- Marvin (acoustic): Gibson (6+12 strings); Martin D-45, D-28, Yamaha
- Marvin (electric): Burns Marvin; Fender Stratocaster (Sunburst & Black); Gibson Les Paul De-Luxe.
- Welch (acoustic): Martin D-28
- Farrar (acoustic): Martin D-28
- Farrar (electric): Fender Telecaster (thin-line with 3 Bigsby pedals); Gibson Les Paul

== Line ups ==
=== Studio albums ===
MW&F "MW&F"/"2nd Opinion"

- 1970–1972: Marvin(g)+Welch(g)+Farrar(g) && Alan Hawkshaw(kb)+Clem Cattini(d)+Dave Richmond(b)

MW&F BBC radio1 sessions(unissued)

- 1970–1972: Marvin(g)+Welch(g)+Farrar(g) && Brian Bennett(d)+Geoff Atherton(b)

M&F "HM&JF"

- 1973: Marvin(g)+Farrar(g) && Alan Tarney(b)+Trevor Spencer(d)+OliviaNJ(recorder)+BBennett(perc)

=== Live concerts ===
MW&F (w/Gene Pitney or w/Cliff Richard)

- 1970–71: Marvin(g)+Welch(g)+Farrar(g)

M&F (Japan Tour – Cliff Richard/Olivia Newton-john/Pat Carroll)

- 1972: Marvin(g)+Farrar(g) && Rostill(b)+Hawkshaw(kb)+Bennett(d)

M&F (Ronnie Scott's jazz club)

- 1973: Marvin(g)+Farrar(g) && Dave Olney(b)+Andrew Steele(d)

M&F (Batleys Night club)

- 1973: Marvin(g)+Farrar(g) && Geoff Atherton(b)+Andrew Steele(d) 1973: Hank Marvin, John Farrar, Andrew Steele, Pat Carroll,. Robert Young (Bailey's cabaret club circuit) UK.

== Session musicians ==
- Clem Cattini – Drums and percussion – (1st album)
- Dave Richmond – Bass guitar – (1st/2nd albums)
- Alan Hawkshaw – Piano and organ – (1st/2nd albums)
- Peter Vince – Piano and organ – (1st album)
- Brian Bennett – Drums and percussion (2nd album/M&F album)
- Duffy Power – Harmonica – (2nd album)
- Johnny Van Derek – Fiddle – (2nd album)
- Dave Olney – Bass guitar – live
- Geoff Atherton – Bass guitar – live
- Andrew Steele – Drums – live
- Alan Tarney – Bass guitar – (M&F album)
- Trevor Spencer – Drums and percussion – (M&F album)
- Olivia Newton-John – Recorder – (M&F album)
- Richard Hewson – Orchestra – (M&F album)
- Robert Young (born Robert Parkes Stockport) – live percussion

== Bibliography ==
Books

- 1. The Story of the Shadows by Mike Read. 1983. Elm Tree books. ISBN 0-241-10861-6.
- 2. Rock 'n' Roll, I Gave You The Best Years of My Life — A Life in the Shadows by Bruce Welch. ISBN 0-670-82705-3 (Penguin Books).
- 3. A pocket guide to Shadow music, by M.Campbell, R.Bradford, L.Woosey. Idmon. ISBN 0-9535567-4-3.
- 4. A guide to The Shadows and Hank Marvin on CD, by M.Cambell & L.Woosey. Idmon. ISBN 0-9535567-3-5.
- 5. The Complete Rock Family Rock Trees, by Pete Frame. Omnibus. ISBN 0-7119-6879-9.
- 6. The Shadows Discography, by John Friesen. No ISBN.
- 7. The Shadows Discography, by George Geddes. No ISBN.
- 8. Guinness World Records: British Hit Singles and Albums (19th Edn), David Roberts. ISBN 1-904994-10-5.
- 9. The Complete Book of the British Charts Singles and Albums, by Neil Warwick, Jon Kutner & Tony Brown, 3rd Edn. ISBN 978-1-84449-058-5.
- 10. John Farrar — Music makes my day, (A Shadsfax-Tribute-40pp-booklet), by T.Hoffman, A.Hardwick, S.Duffy, G.Jermy, A.Lewis, J.Auman. No ISBN.

Sheet Music (Book Albums)

- 1. Marvin Welch and Farrar, 1970, Music Sales Ltd. ISBN ????????.
