= Sailor (band) =

British glam/pop rock group

- Origin: UK
- Genres: Glam rock
- Years active: 1973–1979, 1990-2014
- Past members: Georg Kajanus; Henry Marsh; Phil Pickett; Grant Serpell

Sailor were a British pop/glam rock group, best known in the 1970s for their hit singles "A Glass of Champagne" and "Girls, Girls, Girls", written by the group's lead singer and 12-string guitar player, Georg Kajanus. According to the band's own website, Sailor stopped performing in May 2014.

== In the 1970s ==
The group's leader, Georg Kajanus, had previously written "Flying Machine" for Cliff Richard in 1971, although it was Richard's first British single that failed to reach the top 30. Sailor developed from Kajanus Pickett, a singer-songwriter duo that had formed when Phil Pickett and Kajanus met in 1970 at E H Morris, a music publisher where Pickett briefly worked. They later recorded the album Hi Ho Silver for Signpost Records. Sailor first came together in 1973 with the addition of musicians Henry Marsh (ex-Gringo) and Grant Serpell (ex-Affinity).

The group's work included Kajanus's invention of a special nickelodeon made of pianos, synthesizers and glockenspiels that allowed the four-piece band to reproduce on stage the acoustic arrangements that they had done in the recording studio.

The group's first UK single was "Traffic Jam" from their first album, Sailor. "A Glass of Champagne", issued late the following year from the Trouble album, reached No. 2 in the UK Singles Chart. The follow-up "Girls, Girls, Girls" also made the Top 10, but of their subsequent singles, only "One Drink Too Many" registered in the UK Top 40.

Sailor's original line-up split up in 1978, although Pickett and Marsh released more material as Sailor with Gavin and Virginia David in 1980, with an album of Pickett compositions called Dressed for Drowning, produced by James William Guercio at his Caribou studio in Colorado (Epic / Caribou).

== Revival ==
In 1989, Sailor reformed to release a new album after a ten-year silence with two new singles, "The Secretary" and "La Cumbia". The band started touring again in 1993, and performed on many television programmes in Europe. In 1995, Kajanus departed the band again to pursue other projects. The arrival of Peter Lincoln saw Sailor issue their first live album, Live in Berlin. Original member Marsh left in 1999, and was replaced by Anthony England. England left the band in May 2001, to be replaced by Rob Alderton; the new line-up recorded their first DVD in November 2002. In 2004, Sailor in a German TV show were named the 45th-most successful pop band of the last 40 years in Germany. A biography of the group by James McCarraher, entitled A Glass of Champagne – The Official Sailor Story, was published in June 2004. Alderton left in July 2005, and Marsh returned to the line-up.

Buried Treasure, a double album of previously recorded material, was released in February 2006. By September, Lincoln had left Sailor to join Sweet. After this, Marsh's classically trained son Oliver joined the band as their new guitarist and lead singer. He was replaced in 2009 by Nick Parvin but rejoined in May 2011 along with his brother Thomas, who joined as drummer, replacing Serpell. According to the band's own website, Sailor stopped performing in May 2014.

== Band members ==
Georg Kajanus (born Prince Georg Johan Tchegodaieff, 9 June 1946, Trondheim, Norway)
1973–1979, 1990–1995: lead vocals, 12-string guitars, acoustic guitars, charango, Veracruzana harp, harmonium, synthesisers, "Klockwork machinery"
Henry Marsh (born Ian Henry Murray Marsh, 8 December 1948, Bath, Somerset)
1973–1999, 2005–2014: Nickelodeon, accordion, piano, marimbas, synthesised brass and reed, synthesisers, acoustic/electric guitars, computer programming, vocals
Phil Pickett (born Philip Stuart Pickett, 19 November 1946, Münster, Germany)
1973–2014 (except Checkpoint): bass Nickelodeon, piano, guitarron, synthesised strings, calliope, xylophone, bass, cruz bass, Hammond organ, mandolin, autoharp, vocals (lead vocals on Dressed for Drowning)
Grant Serpell (born Stephen Grant Serpell, 9 February 1944, Maidenhead, Berkshire)
1973–1979, 1990–2011: drums, percussion, vocals
Gavin David
1980: vocals
Virginia David
1980: lead and backing vocals
Peter Lincoln
1996–2006: 12-string and 6-string acoustic guitars, electric guitar, charango, lead vocals
Anthony England
1999–2001: Nickelodeon, vocals
Rob Alderton
2001–2005: Nickelodeon, accordion, vocals
Oliver Marsh
2006–2009, 2011-2014: guitar, lead vocals
Nick Parvin
2009–2011:guitar, lead vocals
Thomas Marsh
2011–2014: drums, percussion, vocals

== Discography ==
=== Studio albums ===
Year	Title	Details	Peak chart positions							
Year	Title	Details	AUS	AUT	FIN	GER	NL	NOR	SWE	UK
1974	Sailor	Released: August 1974; Label: Epic	91	-	-	-	2	-	-	-
1975	Trouble	Released: November 1975; Label: Epic	17	5	2	3	4	18	25	45
1976	The Third Step	Released: September 1976; Label: Epic	-	-	4	11	-	11	26	-
1977	Checkpoint	Released: August 1977; Label: Epic	-	-	-	44	-	16	48	-
1978	Hideaway	Released: September 1978; Label: Magnet (MAGL 5042)	-	-	-	-	-	-	29	-
1980	Dressed for Drowning	Released: 1980; Label: Caribou	-	-	-	-	-	-	-	-
1991	Sailor	Released: 1991; Label: RCA; Different from 1974 album	-	-	-	-	-	-	-	-
1992	Street Lamp	Released: September 1992; Label: RCA	-	-	-	-	-	-	-	-

=== Compilations ===
- 1978 Greatest Hits Vol.1
- 1990 Girls, Girls, Girls: The Very Best of Sailor
- 1994 Hits and Highlights
- 1995 Greatest Hits – Best of the Best
- 1996 Legacy: Greatest and Latest
- 1999 Girls, Girls, Girls
- 2002 Sailor
- 2005 Best: Down by the Docks
- 2006 Buried Treasure (double CD)
- 2007 Buried Treasure (single CD)
- 2007 The Best of Sailor
- 2007 A Glass of Champagne: All the Hits
- 2008 Traffic Jam: Sound and Vision (CD/DVD)

=== Live albums and DVDs ===
- 1998 Live in Berlin
- 2003 Pirate Copy: Sailor Live in Concert (DVD)
- 2005 Sailor Live
- 2005 Sailor Live: One Drink Too Many

=== Singles ===
Year	Single	Peak chart positions													
Year	Single	UK	AUS	AUT	BE (FLA)	BE (WA)	FIN	GER	IRE	NL 40	NL 100	NZ	NOR	SUI	SWE
1974	"Traffic Jam"	-	47	-	24	-	-	-	-	4	10	-	-	-	-
1975	"Blue Desert"	-	-	-	-	-	-	-	-	-	-	-	-	-	-
1975	"Sailor"	-	-	-	12	50	-	-	-	2	2	-	-	-	-
1975	"Let's Go to Town" (Netherlands-only release)	-	-	-	-	-	-	-	-	-	(Note: "Let's Go to Town" did not chart on the Single Top 100, but did reach #3 on the Single Tip chart)	-	-	-	-
1975	"Abre la Puerta (Open Up the Door)" (Spain-only release)	-	-	-	-	-	-	-	-	-	-	-	-	-	-
1975	"A Glass of Champagne"	2	4	8	11	47	23	3	1	5	3	-	8	3	15
1975	"The Old Nickelodeon Sound" (New Zealand-only release)	-	-	-	-	-	-	-	-	-	-	-	-	-	-
1976	"Girls, Girls, Girls"	7	21	3	6	39	8	2	16	2	2	13	6	2	-
1976	"Stiletto Heels"	55 (Note: Chart position is from the official UK "Breakers List".)	-	-	-	-	21	12	-	-	-	-	-	11	-
1977	"One Drink Too Many"	35	-	21	-	-	-	22	-	-	-	-	-	-	-
1977	"Down by the Docks"	-	-	-	-	-	-	24	-	-	-	-	-	-	-
1977	"Romance"	-	-	-	-	-	-	-	-	-	-	-	-	-	-
1978	"All I Need Is a Girl"	-	-	-	-	-	-	-	-	-	-	-	-	-	-
1978	"The Runaway"	-	-	-	-	-	-	-	-	-	-	-	-	-	-
1978	"Give Me Shakespeare"	-	-	21	-	-	-	-	-	-	-	-	-	-	-
1978	"Stay the Night"	-	-	-	-	-	-	-	-	-	-	-	-	-	-
1979	"Stranger in Paris" (Netherlands-only release)	-	-	-	-	-	-	-	-	-	-	-	-	-	-
1980	"Don't Send Flowers"	-	-	-	-	-	-	-	-	-	-	-	-	-	-
1981	"Danger on the Titanic"	-	-	-	-	-	-	-	-	-	-	-	-	-	-
1981	"Hat Check Girl" (Promo; US-only release)	-	-	-	-	-	-	-	-	-	-	-	-	-	-
1990	"The Secretary" (Europe-only release)	-	-	-	-	-	-	33	-	-	-	-	-	-	-
1991	"Music" (Europe-only release)	-	-	-	-	-	-	-	-	-	-	-	-	-	-
1991	"La Cumbia"	-	-	24	4	-	-	25	-	6	7	-	-	-	-
1991	"Knock Knock" (Europe-only release)	-	-	-	-	-	-	-	-	-	-	-	-	-	-
1992	"Latino Lover" (Europe-only release)	-	-	-	-	-	-	61	-	-	-	-	-	-	-
1992	"It Takes 2 to Tango" (Germany-only release)	-	-	-	-	-	-	-	-	-	-	-	-	-	-
1992	"Precious Form" (Germany-only release)	-	-	-	-	-	-	-	-	-	-	-	-	-	-
1996	"Karma Chameleon" (Denmark-only release)	-	-	-	-	-	-	-	-	-	-	-	-	-	-
2001	"Estepona" (UK-only release)	-	-	-	-	-	-	-	-	-	-	-	-	-	-

=== Sailor, the Musical Journey ===
The premiere of Sailor, the Musical Journey at the Carnegie Hall was in July 2006 in Dunfermline, Scotland. The new musical was written by Bill Blenman and made up entirely of Kajanus compositions.
