= Marianne (Sergio Endrigo song) =

1968 song by Sergio Endrigo

Single by Sergio Endrigo
- Language: Italian
- B-side: "Il dolce paese"
- Released: April 1968
- Genre: Pop
- Length: 3:06
- Label: Cetra
- Songwriter: Sergio Endrigo

Sergio Endrigo singles chronology
| "Canzone per te" (1968) | "Marianne" (1968) | "La colomba" (1968) |

Eurovision Song Contest 1968 entry
- Country: Italy
- Artist: Sergio Endrigo
- Language: Italian
- Composer: Sergio Endrigo
- Lyricist: Sergio Endrigo
- Conductor: Giancarlo Bigazzi

Finals performance
- Final result: 10th
- Final points: 7

Entry chronology
- ◄ "Non andare più lontano" (1967)
- "Due grosse lacrime bianche" (1969) ►

"Marianne" is a song composed, written, and recorded by Italian singer Sergio Endrigo. It represented Italy in the Eurovision Song Contest 1968 held in London, placing tenth. Cliff Richard recorded later a cover version of the song with English lyrics written by Bill Owen.

== Background ==
=== Conception ===
"Marianne" was composed, written, and recorded by Sergio Endrigo. It is a ballad, with the singer expressing his love for the title character. He sings, however, that she never stays with him, and he wonders about what she is doing. Nonetheless, his feelings for her remain unaltered. In addition to the Italian language original version, he also recorded a version with French lyrics by Jacques Chaumelle.

=== Selection ===
Radiotelevisione italiana (RAI) internally selected "Marianne" performed by Endrigo as it entrant for the 13th edition of the Eurovision Song Contest.

=== Eurovision ===
On 6 April 1968, the Eurovision Song Contest was held at the Royal Albert Hall in London hosted by the British Broadcasting Corporation (BBC), and broadcast live throughout the continent. Endrigo performed "Marianne" eleventh on the evening, following France's "La source" by Isabelle Aubret and preceding the UK's "Congratulations" by Cliff Richard. Giancarlo Bigazzi conducted the event's orchestra in the performance of the Italian entry.

At the close of voting, the song had received 7 points, placing it tenth in a field of seventeen. It was succeeded as Italian representative at the 1969 contest by "Due grosse lacrime bianche" by Iva Zanicchi.

== Legacy ==
=== Cliff Richard version ===
"Marianne"
- Cover of the single released in Germany

Single by Cliff Richard

from the album Established 1958
- B-side: "Mr. Nice"
- Released: 20 September 1968
- Recorded: 2 July 1968
- Studio: Chappell Studios, London
- Genre: Pop
- Length: 3:19
- Label: Columbia
- Composer: Sergio Endrigo
- Lyricist: Bill Owen
- Producer: Norrie Paramor

Cliff Richard singles chronology
| "I'll Love You Forever Today" (1968) | "Marianne" (1968) | "Don't Forget to Catch Me" (1968) |

Following the Contest, it was rewritten in English by Bill Owen for Cliff Richard to record. "Marianne" features an accompaniment by the Mike Leander Orchestra and was released as a single in September with the B-side "Mr. Nice", written by Terry Britten. It peaked at number 22 on the UK Singles Chart.

==== Reception ====
Reviewing for Record Mirror, Peter Jones described "Marianne" as "a really lovely ballad, a hymn of praise to a chick, and Richard really shows off his vocal range, to a swelling, swirling orchestral backing laid down lovingly by Mike Leander. As ever, it's a distinctive vocal treatment and perhaps Richard's most ambitious bit of actually singing on record". For New Musical Express, Derek Johnson described the song as "a piquant and emotional ballad" that "certainly doesn't register with an immediate impact. But once you've heard it a few times, you'll find that the haunting melody is firmly implanted in your mind, and you just can't lose it".

==== Track listing ====
7": Columbia / DB 8476

1. "Marianne" – 3:19
2. "Mr. Nice" – 2:13

7": Columbia / DSA 834 (South Africa)

1. "Marianne" – 3:19
2. "Close to Kathy" – 2:48

==== Charts ====
| Chart (1968) | Peak position |
|---|---|
| Australia (Kent Music Report) | 56 |
| Belgium (Ultratop 50 Flanders) | 18 |
| Belgium (Ultratop 50 Wallonia) | 33 |
| Ireland (IRMA) | 15 |
| Netherlands (Dutch Top 40) | 37 |
| UK Singles (OCC) | 22 |
