= Al Hodge (rock musician) =

English guitarist and songwriter (1950–2006)

Al Hodge (21 December 1950 – 6 July 2006) was an English guitarist, singer and songwriter, who had success with "Rock 'n' Roll Mercenaries", a song that was recorded by Meat Loaf with John Parr in 1986. Hodge co-wrote the song with an American, Michael Dan Ehmig.

Hodge was one of the most successful singer-songwriters to come out of Cornwall in recent years. For 40 years Hodge, who was born in Bodmin, performed mostly in pubs and clubs. During the 1960s, he was the guitarist for the Cornish rock band the Onyx. In the mid to late 1970s, he was a member of the soft rock band Rogue. He also did session work with English singer Toyah Willcox, rock band Sad Café, Randy Crawford, Linda Ronstadt, Clifford T. Ward and Suzi Quatro.

Hodge was a guitarist for Leo Sayer from 1981 to 1985, and for Elkie Brooks in 1999 and 2000. He wrote music for numerous television programmes and appeared on many TV shows throughout Europe.

In the years before he died, he taught many young guitarists in Cornwall. He died after a two-year battle with cancer, at the age of 55, on 6 July 2006.

In July 2007, the first Alstock Festival was held in his memory, with one of the bands made up of Al Hodge's students. In June 2008, the second Alstock took place in Bodmin, with a much larger line-up of local bands. It is now held every year on the last Saturday in July. In addition, every year an award is now made at Bodmin College in Hodge's name. The Al Hodge Young Musician Award includes a £500 grant for outstanding dedication or achievements in the school year.
