= 75 at 75 =

2015 compilation album by Cliff Richard

Compilation album by Cliff Richard
- Released: 18 September 2015
- Genre: Pop; rock
- Label: Rhino; Warner Music UK

Cliff Richard chronology
The Fabulous Rock 'n' Roll Songbook (2013)	75 at 75 (2015)	Just... Fabulous Rock 'n' Roll (2016)

Singles from 75 at 75
- 1. "Golden" Released: 16 August 2015

75 at 75 is a three-CD compilation album by the British singer Cliff Richard, released in 2015. The album contains 75 tracks spanning Richard's career of more than 55 years and was released to coincide with his 75th birthday.

The album includes one new track, "Golden", written by Chris Eaton who also wrote Richard's 1990 UK Christmas number one single, "Saviour's Day".

== Track listing ==
=== Disc 1 ===
1. "Move It"
2. "High Class Baby"
3. "Mean Streak"
4. "Living Doll"
5. "Travellin' Light"
6. "A Voice In the Wilderness"
7. "Fall In Love with You"
8. "Please Don't Tease"
9. "Nine Times Out of Ten"
10. "I Love You"
11. "Theme for a Dream"
12. "Gee Whiz It's You"
13. "A Girl Like You"
14. "When the Girl in Your Arms Is the Girl in Your Heart"
15. "The Young Ones"
16. "I'm Looking Out the Window"
17. "Do You Wanna Dance"
18. "It'll Be Me"
19. "The Next Time"
20. "Bachelor Boy"
21. "Summer Holiday"
22. "Lucky Lips"
23. "It's All in the Game"
24. "Don't Talk to Him"
25. "I'm the Lonely One"
26. "Constantly"
27. "On the Beach"
28. "The Twelfth of Never"
29. "I Could Easily Fall in Love with You"
30. "The Minute You're Gone"
31. "Wind Me Up (Let Me Go)"

=== Disc 2 ===
1. "Visions"
2. "Time Drags By"
3. "In the Country"
4. "It's All Over"
5. "The Day I Met Marie"
6. "All My Love (Solo Tu)"
7. "Congratulations"
8. "Big Ship"
9. "Throw Down a Line"
10. "Goodbye Sam, Hello Samantha"
11. "Power to All Our Friends"
12. "Miss You Nights"
13. "Devil Woman"
14. "We Don't Talk Anymore"
15. "Carrie"
16. "Dreaming"
17. "A Little in Love"
18. "Wired for Sound"
19. "Daddy's Home"
20. "The Only Way Out"
21. "She Means Nothing to Me"
22. "True Love Ways"
23. "Please Don't Fall in Love"
24. "All I Ask of You" (featuring Sarah Brightman)
25. "My Pretty One"

=== Disc 3 ===
1. "Some People"
2. "Mistletoe and Wine"
3. "The Best of Me"
4. "I Just Don't Have the Heart"
5. "Silhouettes"
6. "From a Distance"
7. "Saviour's Day"
8. "We Should Be Together"
9. "I Still Believe in You"
10. "Peace in Our Time"
11. "Can't Keep This Feeling In"
12. "The Millennium Prayer"
13. "Somewhere Over the Rainbow"/"What a Wonderful World"
14. "Santa's List"
15. "Somethin' Is Goin' On"
16. "21st Century Christmas"
17. "Move It" [remake] (featuring Brian Bennett and Brian May)
18. "Thank You for a Lifetime"
19. "Golden"

== Charts and certifications ==
=== Weekly charts ===
Chart (2015−16)	Peak position
UK Albums (OCC)	4
Belgian Albums (Ultratop Flanders)	110
Dutch Albums (Album Top 100)	63
Irish Albums (IRMA)	42

=== Year-end charts ===
Chart (2015)	Position
United Kingdom (OCC)	67

=== Certifications ===
Region	Certification	Certified units/sales
United Kingdom (BPI)	Gold	100,000^{‡}
^{‡} Sales+streaming figures based on certification alone.
