= The Whole Story: His Greatest Hits =

2000 greatest hits album by Cliff Richard

Greatest hits album by Cliff Richard
- Released: 9 October 2000
- Genres: Pop; rock
- Length: 153:25
- Label: EMI

Cliff Richard chronology
Real as I Wanna Be (1998)	The Whole Story: His Greatest Hits (2000)	Wanted (2001)

Professional ratings
Review scores
Source	Rating
AllMusic	4.5/5 stars

The Whole Story: His Greatest Hits is a greatest hits album by Cliff Richard, released in 2000. It includes 46 of Richard's biggest hits, from his first single "Move It" to his then most recent single, "The Millennium Prayer". The album reached number 6 in the UK Albums Chart.

== Track listing ==
Disc 1

1. "Move It" (Ian Samwell)
2. "Living Doll" (Lionel Bart)
3. "Travellin' Light" (Brian Bennett, Sid Tepper)
4. "Please Don't Tease" (Peter Chester, Bruce Welch)
5. "I Love You" (Bruce Welch)
6. "The Young Ones (Brian Bennett, Sid Tepper)
7. "It'll Be Me" (Jack Clement)
8. "Do You Wanna Dance" (Bobby Freeman)
9. "The Next Time" (Buddy Kaye, Philip Springer)
10. "Bachelor Boy" (Cliff Richard, Bruce Welch)
11. "Summer Holiday" (Brian Bennett, Bruce Welch)
12. "It's All in the Game" (Charles Dawes, Carl Sigman)
13. "Don't Talk to Him" (Cliff Richard, Bruce Welch)
14. "Constantly" (Michael Julien, Saverio Seracini)
15. "On the Beach" (Hank Marvin, Cliff Richard, Bruce Welch)
16. "I Could Easily Fall (In Love with You)" (Brian Bennett, Hank Marvin, John Rostill, Bruce Welch)
17. "The Minute You're Gone" (Jimmy Gateley)
18. "Visions" (Paul Ferris)
19. "In the Country" (Brian Bennett, Hank Marvin, John Rostill, Bruce Welch)
20. "The Day I Met Marie" (Hank Marvin)
21. "Power to All Our Friends" (Guy Fletcher, Doug Flett)
22. "Miss You Nights" (David Townsend)
23. "Devil Woman" (Terry Britten, Christine Holmes)
24. "My Kinda Life" (Chris East)
25. "We Don't Talk Anymore" (Alan Tarney)
26. "Carrie" (Terry Britten, B. A. Robertson)
27. "Dreamin'" (Leo Sayer, Alan Tarney)

Disc 2

1. "Wired for Sound" (Alan Tarney, B. A. Robertson)
2. "Daddy's Home" (William Miller, James Sheppard)
3. "The Only Way Out" (Craig Pruess)
4. "True Love Ways" (Buddy Holly, Norman Petty)
5. "Please Don't Fall in Love" (Mike Batt)
6. "She's So Beautiful" (Oli Poulsen)
7. "My Pretty One" (Alan Tarney)
8. "Some People" (Alan Tarney)
9. "Mistletoe and Wine" (Jeremy Paul, Leslie Stewart, Keith Strachan)
10. "The Best of Me" (David Foster, Jeremy Lubbock, Richard Marx)
11. "I Just Don't Have the Heart" (Stock Aitken Waterman)
12. "Silhouettes" (Bob Crewe, Frank Slay)
13. "From a Distance" (Julie Gold)
14. "Saviour's Day" (Chris Eaton)
15. "I Still Believe in You" (Dean Pitchford, David Pomeranz)
16. "Peace in Our Time" (Andy Hill, Peter Sinfield)
17. "Be with Me Always" (John Farrar, Tim Rice)
18. "Can't Keep This Feeling In" (Dennis Lambert, Arnie Roman, Steve Skinner)
19. "The Millennium Prayer" (traditional)

== Charts and certifications ==
=== Weekly charts ===
Chart (2000)	Peak position
Australian Albums (ARIA)	26
New Zealand Albums (RMNZ)	12
UK Albums (Official Charts)	6

=== Year-end charts ===
Chart (2000)	Position
UK Albums (OCC)	48

=== Certifications ===
Region	Certification	Certified units/sales
United Kingdom (BPI)	Platinum	300,000^{^}
New Zealand (RMNZ)	Gold	7,500^{^}
^{^} Shipments figures based on certification alone.
