= Stronger Thru the Years =

2017 compilation album by Cliff Richard

Compilation album by Cliff Richard
- Released: 10 November 2017
- Label: Rhino; Warner Music UK

Cliff Richard chronology
Just... Fabulous Rock 'n' Roll (2016)	Stronger Thru the Years (2017)	Rise Up (2018)

Stronger Thru the Years is a compilation album by Cliff Richard, released in 2017.

== Track listing ==
Disc 1

1. "Stronger Than That" (Alan Tarney)
2. "Miss You Nights" (Dave Townsend)
3. "The Next Time" (with The Shadows) (Buddy Kaye, Philip Springer)
4. "Dreamin'" (Leo Sayer, Alan Tarney)
5. "Joanna" (Chris Eaton)
6. "It's All in the Game" (Charles Dawes, Carl Sigman)
7. "The Minute You're Gone" (Jimmy Gateley)
8. "The Day I Met Marie" (Hank Marvin)
9. "Living Doll" (with The Drifters) (Lionel Bart)
10. "Travellin' Light" (with The Shadows) (Roy Bennett, Sid Tepper)
11. "Please Don't Tease" (with The Shadows) (Peter Chester, Bruce Welch)
12. "I Just Don't Have the Heart" (Matt Aitken, Mike Stock, Pete Waterman)
13. "Fall in Love with You" (with The Shadows) (Ian Ralph Samwell)
14. "I Love You" (with The Shadows) (Bruce Welch)
15. "Clear Blue Skies" (Dave Cook, Chris Turner)
16. "The Young Ones" (with The Shadows) (Roy Bennett, Sid Tepper)
17. "Summer Holiday" (with The Shadows) (Brian Bennett, Roy Bennett, Bruce Welch)
18. "Always Guaranteed" (Alan Tarney)
19. "Don't Talk to Him" (with The Shadows) (Cliff Richard, Bruce Welch)

Disc 2

1. "When the Girl in Your Arms Is the Girl in Your Heart" (Roy Bennett, Sid Tepper)
2. "Constantly" (Vincenzo D'Acquisto, Michael Julien, Saverio Seracini)
3. "Remember Me" (Alan Tarney)
4. "The Twelfth of Never" (Jerry Livingston, Paul Francis Webster)
5. "I Could Easily Fall (In Love with You)" (with The Shadows) (Brian Bennett, Hank Marvin, John Rostill, Bruce Welch)
6. "Wind Me Up (Let Me Go)" (Bob Montgomery, John Talley)
7. "Do You Wanna Dance" (with The Shadows) (Bobby Freeman)
8. "Devil Woman" (Terry Britten, Christine Sparkle)
9. "All My Love (Solo Tu)" (Federico Monti Arduini, Peter Callander)
10. "We Don't Talk Anymore" (Alan Tarney)
11. "She Means Nothing to Me" (with Phil Everly) (John David)
12. "Carrie" (Terry Britten, BA Robertson)
13. "Suddenly" [From the film Xanadu] (with Olivia Newton-John) (John Farrar)
14. "Sci-Fi" (Terry Britten, BA Robertson)
15. "All I Ask of You" (featuring Sarah Brightman (Andrew Lloyd Webber)
16. "The Best of Me" (David Foster, Jeremy Lubbock, Richard Marx)
17. "Monday Thru' Friday" (Terry Britten)
18. "Daddy's Home" (William Miller, James Sheppard)
19. "Rock 'n' Roll Juvenile" (Cliff Richard)

== Charts and certifications ==
=== Weekly charts ===
Chart (2017)	Peak position
UK Albums Chart	14

=== Certifications ===
Region	Certification	Certified units/sales
United Kingdom (BPI)	Silver	60,000^{‡}
^{‡} Sales+streaming figures based on certification alone.
