= 40 Golden Greats (Cliff Richard album) =

1977 compilation album by Cliff Richard

Compilation album by Cliff Richard
- Released: 30 September 1977
- Recorded: 24 July 1958 – 10 January 1977
- Genre: Pop, rock and roll
- Length: 107:59
- Label: EMI Records
- Producer: Norrie Paramor, Bruce Welch, David Mackay

Cliff Richard chronology
Every Face Tells a Story (1977)	40 Golden Greats (1977)	Small Corners (1978)

40 Golden Greats is a compilation album by Cliff Richard made up of his biggest hit songs from the start of his music career (with his original backing band The Shadows) through to his most recent solo hits of the time. The double album was released on EMI Records in September 1977 and reached number one on the UK Albums Chart.

== Track listing ==
=== Album 1 ===
Side A

Track #	Song title	Credits	Length
1	"Move It"	Cliff Richard & The Drifters	2:24
2	"Livin' Doll"	Cliff Richard & The Drifters	2:38
3	"Travellin' Light"	Cliff Richard and The Shadows	2:39
4	"Fall in Love with You"	Cliff Richard and The Shadows	2:31
5	"Please Don't Tease"	Cliff Richard and The Shadows	2:59
6	"Nine Times Out of Ten"	Cliff Richard and The Shadows	2:08
7	"Theme for a Dream"	Cliff Richard and The Shadows	2:06
8	"Gee Whizz It's You"	Cliff Richard and The Shadows	2:00
9	"When the Girl in Your Arms Is the Girl in Your Heart"	Cliff Richard	2:24
10	"A Girl Like You"	Cliff Richard and the Shadows	2:31

Side B

Track #	Song title	Credits	Length
1	"The Young Ones"	Cliff Richard and the Shadows	3:11
2	"Do You Want to Dance"	Cliff Richard and the Shadows	2:15
3	"I'm Looking Out the Window"	Cliff Richard	2:46
4	"It'll Be Me"	Cliff Richard and The Shadows	1:55
5	"Bachelor Boy"	Cliff Richard and The Shadows	2:02
6	"The Next Time"	Cliff Richard and The Shadows	2:57
7	"Summer Holiday"	Cliff Richard and The Shadows	2:07
8	"Lucky Lips"	Cliff Richard and The Shadows	2:43
9	"It's All in the Game"	Cliff Richard	3:12
10	"Don't Talk to Him"	Cliff Richard and the Shadows	2:52

=== Album 2 ===
Side A

Track #	Song title	Credits	Length
1	"Constantly"	Cliff Richard	2:39
2	"On the Beach"	Cliff Richard and The Shadows	2:28
3	"I Could Easily Fall (In Love with You)"	Cliff Richard and The Shadows	2:55
4	"The Minute You're Gone"	Cliff Richard	2:21
5	"Wind Me Up (Let Me Go)"	Cliff Richard	2:29
6	"Visions"	Cliff Richard	3:01
7	"Blue Turns to Grey"	Cliff Richard and The Shadows	2:22
8	"In the Country"	Cliff Richard and The Shadows	2:43
9	"The Day I Met Marie"	Cliff Richard	2:16
10	"All My Love"	Cliff Richard	2:57

Side B

Track #	Song title	Credits	Length
1	"Congratulations"	Cliff Richard	2:32
2	"Throw Down a Line"	Cliff & Hank	2:49
3	"Goodbye Sam, Hello Samantha"	Cliff Richard	2:48
4	"Sing a Song of Freedom"	Cliff Richard	3:25
5	"Power to All Our Friends"	Cliff Richard	3:03
6	"(You Keep Me) Hangin' On"	Cliff Richard	2:59
7	"Miss You Nights"	Cliff Richard	3:58
8	"Devil Woman"	Cliff Richard	3:36
9	"I Can't Ask for Anymore Than You"	Cliff Richard	2:50
10	"My Kinda Life"	Cliff Richard	3:27

== Charts and certifications ==
=== Weekly charts ===
Chart (1977)	Peak position
German Albums (Offizielle Top 100)	30
UK Albums (OCC)	1

=== Year-end charts ===
Chart (1977)	Position
UK Albums (OCC)	26

=== Certifications ===
Region	Certification	Certified units/sales
United Kingdom (BPI)	Platinum	300,000^{^}
^{^} Shipments figures based on certification alone.
