= Reunited – Cliff Richard and The Shadows =

2009 studio album by Cliff Richard & The Shadows

Studio album by Cliff Richard & The Shadows
- Released: 21 September 2009
- Recorded: 2009
- Genre: Rock and roll
- Length: 69:22
- Label: EMI Records
- Producer: Brian Bennett, Warren Bennett

Cliff Richard & The Shadows chronology
The 50th Anniversary Album (2008)	Reunited – Cliff Richard and The Shadows (2009)	Bold as Brass (2010)

Singles from Reunited – Cliff Richard and The Shadows
- 1. "Singing the Blues" Released: 14 September 2009

Reunited is a 2009 studio album by British pop singer Cliff Richard and his original backing band the Shadows. The album celebrates the 50th anniversary of Cliff's first recordings and performances with The Shadows, and is their first studio collaboration for forty years. It features re-recordings of their hits from the late 1950s and early 1960s, plus three rock and roll era songs not previously recorded by them; "C'mon Everybody", "Sea Cruise" and the album's only single "Singing the Blues".

It is Richard's 39th studio album and 70th album release overall. It is also the Shadows' 73rd album release overall and features Hank Marvin, Bruce Welch and Brian Bennett.

== Track listing ==
1. I Could Easily Fall (In Love with You) (Hank Marvin, Bruce Welch, John Rostill, Brian Bennett)
2. The Young Ones (Sid Tepper, Roy C. Bennett)
3. Move It (Ian Samwell)
4. Living Doll (Lionel Bart)
5. Bachelor Boy (Bruce Welch, Cliff Richard))
6. Nine Times Out of Ten (Blackwell)
7. C'mon Everybody (Eddie Cochran)
8. Travellin' Light (Sid Tepper, Roy C. Bennett)
9. It'll Be Me (Jack Clement)
10. In the Country (Marvin, Welch, Rostill, Bennett)
11. On the Beach (Marvin, Welch, Richard)
12. The Next Time (Buddy Kaye)
13. Please Don't Tease (Bruce Welch, Peter Chester)
14. Sea Cruise (Huey "Piano" Smith)
15. Willie and the Hand Jive (Johnny Otis)
16. Summer Holiday (Bruce Welch, Brian Bennett)
17. Do You Wanna Dance? (Bobby Freeman)
18. Don't Talk to Him (Bruce Welch, Cliff Richard)
19. Time Drags By (Marvin, Welch, Rostill, Bennett)
20. Gee Whizz It's You (Hank Marvin, Pete Chester)
21. Lucky Lips (Leiber and Stoller)
22. Singing the Blues *single (Melvin Endsley)

The limited edition 2-CD set also includes:

1. I'm the Lonely One (Gordon Mills)
2. A Girl Like You (Jerry Lordan)
3. I Love You (Bruce Welch)

== Personnel ==
- Cliff Richard – vocals
- Hank Marvin – lead guitar
- Bruce Welch – rhythm guitar
- Brian Bennett – drums, percussion
- Mark Griffiths – bass guitar
- Warren Bennett – keyboards

Production

- Produced and Arranged By Warren Bennett & Brian Bennett

== Charts and certifications ==
=== Charts ===
Chart (2009−2010)	Peak position
Australian Albums (ARIA)	40
Danish Albums (Hitlisten)	20
Dutch Albums (Album Top 100)	72
New Zealand Albums (RMNZ)	7
Swedish Albums (Sverigetopplistan)	54
UK Albums (OCC)	4

=== Year-end charts ===
Chart (2009)	Position
UK Albums (OCC)	68

=== Certifications ===
Region	Certification	Certified units/sales
United Kingdom (BPI)	Gold	100,000^{*}
^{*} Sales figures based on certification alone.
