= The 50th Anniversary Album =

2008 compilation album by Cliff Richard

Compilation album by Cliff Richard
- Released: 3 November 2008
- Recorded: 1958–2008
- Genre: Rock and roll, pop, easy listening
- Label: EMI Records

Cliff Richard chronology
And They Said It Wouldn't Last (My 50 Years In Music) (2008)	The 50th Anniversary Album (2008)	Reunited – Cliff Richard and The Shadows (2009)

Singles from The 50th Anniversary Album
- 1. "Thank You for a Lifetime" Released: 8 September 2008

The 50th Anniversary Album is a compilation album by Cliff Richard. The album was released by EMI on 3 November 2008 to mark his 50th Anniversary as a recording artist.

The album features 50 tracks across two CDs. It includes Richard's 50th anniversary single "Thank You for a Lifetime" which reached No. 3 in the UK Singles Chart in September 2008.

== Track listing ==
CD one

1. "Move It" (August 1958, No. 2)
2. "Living Doll" (July 1959, No. 1)
3. "Travellin' Light" (October 1959, "No. 1)
4. "Please Don't Tease" (June 1960, No. 1)
5. "Nine Times Out of Ten" (September 1960, No. 3)
6. "I Love You" (December 1960, No. 1)
7. "The Young Ones" (January 1962, No. 1)
8. "I'm Looking Out the Window" (May 1962, No. 2)
9. "Do You Wanna Dance?" (May 1962, No. 2 as B-side of "I'm Looking Out the Window")
10. "It'll Be Me" (August 1962, No. 2)
11. "The Next Time" (November 1962, No. 1)
12. "Bachelor Boy" (November 1962, No. 1)
13. "Summer Holiday" (February 1963, No. 1)
14. "Lucky Lips" (May 1963, No. 4)
15. "It's All in the Game" (August 1963, No. 2)
16. "Don't Talk to Him" (November 1963, No. 2)
17. "Constantly" (April 1964, No. 4)
18. "On the Beach" (June 1964, No. 7)
19. "The Twelfth of Never" (October 1964, No. 8)
20. "I Could Easily Fall (In Love with You)" (November 1964, No. 6)
21. "The Minute You're Gone" (March 1965, No. 1)
22. "Wind Me Up (Let Me Go)" (October 1965, No. 2)
23. "In the Country" (December 1966, No. 6)
24. "The Day I Met Marie" (September 1967, No. 10)
25. "Congratulations" (February 1968, No. 1)
26. "Power to All Our Friends" (March 1973, No. 4)
27. "Miss You Nights" (January 1976, No. 15)
28. "Devil Woman" (April 1976, No. 9)
29. "We Don't Talk Anymore" (July 1979, No. 1)

CD two

1. "Carrie" (January 1980, No. 4)
2. "Dreaming" (August 1980, No. 8)
3. "A Little in Love" (January 1981, No. 15)
4. "Wired for Sound" (August 1981, No. 4)
5. "Daddy's Home" (live) (November 1981, No. 2)
6. "Little Town" (November 1982, No. 11)
7. "True Love Ways" (Live) (April 1983, No. 8)
8. "My Pretty One" (June 1987, No. 6)
9. "Some People" (August 1987, No. 3)
10. "Mistletoe and Wine" (November 1988, No. 1)
11. "The Best of Me" (May 1989, No. 2)
12. "Silhouettes" (live) (August 1990, No. 10)
13. "From a Distance" (October 1990, No. 11)
14. "Saviour's Day" (November 1990, No. 1)
15. "Peace in Our Time" (March 1993, No. 8)
16. "Can't Keep This Feeling In" (October 1998, No. 10)
17. "The Millennium Prayer" (November 1999, No. 1)
18. "Somewhere Over the Rainbow"/"What a Wonderful World" (December 2001, No. 11)
19. "21st Century Christmas" (December 2006, No. 2)
20. "What Car" (May 2005, No. 12)
21. "Thank You for a Lifetime" (September 2008, No. 3)

== Charts and certifications ==
=== Charts ===
Chart (2008)	Peak position
UK Albums (OCC)	11
Danish Albums (Hitlisten)	12
Irish Albums (IRMA)	29
New Zealand Albums (RMNZ)	26

=== Certifications ===
Region	Certification	Certified units/sales
United Kingdom (BPI)	Gold	100,000^{*}
^{*} Sales figures based on certification alone.
