= And They Said It Wouldn't Last: My 50 Years in Music =

2008 box set by Cliff Richard

And They Said It Wouldn't Last (My 50 Years in Music)

Box set by Cliff Richard
- Released: 15 September 2008
- Genre: Pop
- Label: EMI

Cliff Richard chronology
Love... The Album (2007)	And They Said It Wouldn't Last (My 50 Years in Music) (2008)	The 50th Anniversary Album (2008)

......And They Said It Wouldn't Last (My 50 Years in Music) is a commemorative box set released to celebrate Cliff Richard's fifty years in the music business. It was released on 15 September 2008. Its release was preceded on 8 September by a new single called "Thank You for a Lifetime" which doesn't appear in the set. The set includes eight CDs, a reproduction of Cliff's first single (a 10-inch 78 rpm vinyl record of Move It/Schoolboy Crush), a 52-page photo book of Cliff's fifty years in music, and a gold-plated coin bearing the 'Cliff's 50 Anniversary' graphic.

== Boxed set ==
The package is divided into the eight disks

- CD1: The Early Years
- CD2: Rare B-Sides 1963–1989
- CD3: Rare EP Tracks 1961–1991
- CD4: Stage & Screen
- CD5: The Hits — Number Ones Around the World
- CD6: Faith and Inspiration
- CD7: Live in Japan 1972
- CD8: Lost and Found (From the Archives)

== CD1 – The Early Years ==
1. "Move It"
2. "Schoolboy Crush"
3. "High Class Baby"
4. "My Feet Hit the Ground"
5. "Apron Strings"
6. "Livin' Lovin' Doll"
7. "Never Mind"
8. "Mean Woman Blues"
9. "Don't Bug Me Baby"
10. "Blue Suede Shoes"
11. "Dynamite"
12. "Mean Streak"
13. "She's Gone"
14. "I Cannot Find a True Love"
15. "Willie and the Hand Jive"
16. "'D' in Love"
17. "Nine Times Out of Ten"
18. "Choppin' 'n' Changin'"
19. "Mumblin' Mosie"
20. "Tough Enough"
21. "Gee Whiz It's You"
22. "Now's the Time to Fall in Love"
23. "Nine Times Out of Ten" (bonus track)
24. "A Girl Like You" (bonus track)
25. "Fall in Love with You" (bonus track)
26. "Never Mind" (bonus track)
27. "I Love You" (bonus track)
28. "Dynamite" (bonus track)
29. "Michelle" (bonus track)
30. "Poor Boy" (bonus track)

== CD2 – Rare B Sides 1963–1989 ==
1. "Say You're Mine"
2. "True True Lovin'"
3. "Just Another Guy"
4. "Just a Little Bit Too Late"
5. "Somebody Loses"
6. "I Get the Feelin'"
7. "Our Story Book"
8. "Sweet Little Jesus Boy"
9. "Occasional Rain"
10. "She's Leaving You"
11. "So Long"
12. "Monday Comes Too Soon"
13. "I Was Only Fooling Myself"
14. "Time Flies"
15. "Annabella Umbrella"
16. "Pigeon"
17. "A Thousand Conversations"
18. "My Cloud"
19. "Empty Chairs"
20. "The Old Accordion"
21. "Come Back Billie Jo"
22. "I Only Know I Love You" (bonus track)
23. "Back in Vaudeville" (bonus track)
24. "Stronger Than That" (bonus track)
25. "I Just Don't Have the Heart" (bonus track)

== CD3 – Rare EP Tracks 1961–1991 ==
1. "Dream"
2. "I'll See You in My Dreams"
3. "Carnival"
4. "Some of These Days"
5. "For You For Me"
6. "Your Eyes Tell On You"
7. "I Wonder"
8. "I'm in the Mood for Love"
9. "Watch What You Do With My Baby"
10. "Perhaps Perhaps Perhaps"
11. "Frenesi"
12. "Why Don't They Understand"
13. "I'm Afraid to Go Home"
14. "Where is Your Heart"
15. "Lies and Kisses"
16. "Sweet and Gentle"
17. "The Night"
18. "Look Before You Love"
19. "La La La La La"
20. "Never Knew What Love Could Do"
21. "The Twelve Days of Christmas"
22. "The Holly and the Ivy"
23. "It's Wonderful to Be Young" (bonus track)
24. "It Came Upon a Midnight Clear" (bonus track)
25. "Sooner or Later" (bonus track)
26. "A Spoonful of Sugar" (bonus track)
27. "Zip-A-Dee-Do-Dah" (bonus track)
28. "Chim Chim Cheree" (bonus track)

== CD4 – Stage & Screen ==
1. "Mad About You"
2. "Love"
3. "Lessons in Love"
4. "Dancing Shoes"
5. "On the Beach"
6. "This Was My Special Day"
7. "I Could Easily Fall (In Love with You)"
8. "Time Drags By"
9. "Shooting Star"
10. "Why Wasn't I Born Rich"
11. "In the Country"
12. "Two a Penny"
13. "His Land"
14. "Take Me High"
15. "Suddenly"
16. "Born to Rock 'n' Roll"
17. "She's So Beautiful"
18. "It's in Every One of Us"
19. "Misunderstood Man"
20. "Be With Me Always"
21. "Had to Be"

== CD5 – The Hits – Number Ones Around the World ==
1. "Living Doll"
2. "Travellin' Light"
3. "Please Don't Tease"
4. "I Love You"
5. "Theme for a Dream"
6. "When the Girl in Your Arms Is the Girl in Your Heart"
7. "The Young Ones"
8. "It'll Be Me"
9. "The Next Time"
10. "Bachelor Boy"
11. "Summer Holiday"
12. "Lucky Lips"
13. "It's All in the Game"
14. "Constantly"
15. "The Minute You're Gone"
16. "Congratulations"
17. "Power to All Our Friends"
18. "Devil Woman"
19. "We Don't Talk Anymore"
20. "Living Doll (with The Young Ones)"
21. "Mistletoe and Wine"
22. "Saviour's Day"
23. "The Millennium Prayer"

== CD6 – Faith & Inspiration ==
1. "Help It Along"
2. "Higher Ground"
3. "Such is the Mystery"
4. "I Wish We'd All Been Ready"
5. "Up in Canada"
6. "Why Should the Devil Have All the Good Music"
7. "Yes He Lives"
8. "When I Survey the Wondrous Cross"
9. "Walking in the Light"
10. "Better Than I Know Myself"
11. "Discovering"
12. "Be in My Heart"
13. "Little Town"
14. "Love and a Helping Hand"
15. "Yesterday Today Forever"
16. "Where You Are"
17. "There's No Power in Pity"
18. "Free"
19. "Faithful One"

== CD7 – Live in Japan ==
1. "Backscratcher"
2. "Can't Let You Go"
3. "Have a Little Talk With Myself"
4. "Sunny Honey Girl"
5. "The Minute You're Gone"
6. "Flying Machine"
7. "The Day I Met Marie"
8. "Silvery Rain"
9. "My Way"
10. "Move It"
11. "Living in Harmony"
12. "Walk On By"/"The Look of Love"
13. "Early in the Morning"
14. "Goodbye Sam, Hello Samantha"
15. "Living Doll"
16. "Bachelor Boy"
17. "The Young Ones"
18. "Congratulations"
19. "The Girl Can't Help It"
20. "Great Balls of Fire"
21. "Lucille"
22. "Jailhouse Rock"
23. "Good Old Rock 'n' Roll"
24. "Do You Wanna Dance"
25. "Sing a Song of Freedom"

== CD8 – Lost and Found (From the Archives) ==
1. "Deep Purple"
2. "I Love You the Way You Are"
3. "Words"
4. "The Letter"
5. "If I Do"
6. "Note in a Bottle"
7. "All My Love"
8. "The Day I Met Marie"
9. "No Name No Fame"
10. "Love is Like a Crescendo"
11. "Postmark Heaven"
12. "When You Are There"
13. "A Sad Song With a Happy Soul"
14. "'Cause I Believe in Loving"
15. "I Who Have Nothing"
16. "Run For Shelter"
17. "Sweet Lovin' Ways"
18. "Love of My Life"
19. "Honky Tonk Angel"
20. "Song of Yesterday"
21. "Mobile Alabama School Leaving Hullabaloo"
