= Thank You Very Much (album) =

1979 live album by Cliff Richard and The Shadows

Live album by Cliff Richard and The Shadows
- Released: February 1979
- Recorded: March 1978
- Venue: London Palladium, London
- Genre: Pop
- Label: EMI, Columbia/CBS USA
- Producer: Bruce Welch

Cliff Richard chronology
Green Light (1978)	Thank You Very Much (1979)	Rock 'n' Roll Juvenile (1979)

The Shadows chronology
Tasty (1977)	Thank You Very Much (1979)	String of Hits (1979)

Professional ratings
Review scores
Source	Rating
Allmusic	4/5 stars

Thank You Very Much is an album of the March 1978 reunion concerts at the London Palladium by English singer Cliff Richard and the group that backed him in the 1950s and 1960s The Shadows. It was released in February 1979 on the EMI label and reached No. 5 in the UK Albums Chart.

The concert had sections with Richard and The Shadows playing together, The Shadows playing alone and Richard playing more recent material with his own band. There was also an acoustic section credited as Cliff, Hank and Bruce.

The material played spans from the 1958 debut single "Move It" to tracks from Richard's gospel album Small Corners released only a month before the concert (although only "Why Should the Devil Have All the Good Music" made the original album). Although "Please Don't Tease" was originally a number one hit for Cliff Richard and The Shadows in 1960, the version played here is the rearranged version from the B-side of the 1978 single "Please Remember Me" and is played by Cliff's band. The album closes with a cover of Dennis Wilson's "End of the Show" (the closing track from his Pacific Ocean Blue album). The repeated refrain of that song is where the album title Thank You Very Much comes from.

The original album only contains fifteen tracks. A CD version released in 2004 adds three more tracks but the entire concert has never been released. A video version of the concert with the same title features clips and interviews.

== Track listing ==
Side One

1. "The Young Ones" (Sid Tepper, Roy C. Bennett) - Cliff and the Shadows
2. "Do You Wanna Dance" (Bobby Freeman) - Cliff and the Shadows
3. "The Day I Met Marie" (Hank Marvin) - Cliff and the Shadows
4. "Shadoogie" (Marvin, Bruce Welch, Jet Harris, Tony Meehan) - The Shadows
5. "Atlantis" (Jerry Lordan) - The Shadows
6. "Nivram" (Marvin, Welch, Harris) - The Shadows
7. "Apache" (Lordan) - The Shadows
8. "Please Don't Tease" (Welch, Peter Chester) - Cliff Richard
9. "Miss You Nights" (Dave Townsend) - Cliff Richard

Side Two

1. "Move It" (Ian Samwell) - Cliff and the Shadows
2. "Willie and the Hand Jive" (Johnny Otis) - Cliff and the Shadows
3. "All Shook Up" (Otis Blackwell, Elvis Presley) - Cliff, Hank and Bruce
4. "Devil Woman" (Terry Britten, Barry Authors) - Cliff Richard
5. "Why Should the Devil Have All the Good Music" (Larry Norman) - Cliff Richard
6. "End of the Show" (Dennis Wilson, Gregg Jakobson) - Cliff and the Shadows

Additional (previously unreleased) live tracks from the concert (2004 re-issue):

1. "Up In Canada" (Norman) - Cliff Richard
2. "Yes He Lives" (Britten) - Cliff Richard
3. "Let Me Be the One" (Paul Curtis) - The Shadows

== Personnel ==
- Cliff Richard – lead vocals, (and guitar on "All Shook Up")

The Shadows

- Hank Marvin – guitar
- Bruce Welch – guitar (and vocals on "Let Me Be the One")
- Brian Bennett – drums
- Alan Jones – bass guitar
- Cliff Hall – keyboards

Cliff Richard's Band

- Terry Britten – guitar
- Dave Christopher – guitar
- Graham Murray – guitar
- Mo Foster – bass guitar
- Graham Todd – keyboards
- Clem Cattini – drums
- Graham Jarvis – drums
- Tony Rivers – backing vocals
- Stuart Calver – backing vocals
- John Perry – backing vocals

=== Technical personnel ===
- Producer – Bruce Welch (The Shadows solo tracks also produced by Hank Marvin)
- Engineer – Tony Clark (on the RAK Mobile)
- Re-mixing – Tony Clark, Peter Vince (at Abbey Road Studios)

Credits from the album's sleeve notes

== Charts and certifications ==
=== Charts ===
Chart (1979)	Peak position
UK Albums (OCC)	5

=== Certifications ===
Region	Certification	Certified units/sales
United Kingdom (BPI)	Gold	100,000^{^}
^{^} Shipments figures based on certification alone.
