= I'm the Lonely One =

1964 single by Cliff Richard and the Shadows

Single by Cliff Richard and the Shadows
- B-side: "Watch What You Do with My Baby"
- Released: 31 January 1964
- Recorded: 23 November 1963
- Studio: EMI Studios, London
- Genre: Beat; pop; rhythm and blues
- Length: 2:16
- Label: Columbia
- Songwriter: Gordon Mills
- Producer: Norrie Paramor

Cliff Richard and the Shadows singles chronology
"Maria No Mas" (1963)	"I'm the Lonely One" (1964)	"Constantly (L'Edera)" (1964)

"I'm the Lonely One" is a song by Cliff Richard and the Shadows, released as a single in January 1964. It peaked at number 8 on the UK Singles Chart.

== Background and release ==
"I'm the Lonely One" was written by then-Viscounts member Gordon Mills. The B-side, "Watch What You Do with My Baby" was written by Elvis Presley songwriters Bill Giant, Bernie Baum and Florence Kaye. Both songs were included on the EP Cliff's Palladium Successes.

Reviewing for Disc, Don Nicholl described "I'm the Lonely One" as "a snappy change of pace that will probably do [Richard] a lot of good in the parade. The song skips along infectiously on a good light beat and the hand clapping in the accompaniment will pull you in quickly".

The song did receive some criticism however, with one letter to the music press asking why the group had to "sink so low and go all R&B on their latest record? On this disc, they lose all claim to originality". However, Richard said "actually, it wasn't originally planned as a single. I usually include a couple of rockers on my albums, and this song was cut with that in view, but the beat craze changed our plans."

In April 1964, Richard released a German-language version of "I'm the Lonely One", titled "Zuviel allein (The Lonely One)", with German lyrics by Kurt Hertha and backing vocals by the Botho-Lucas-Quartett. It was released as a double A-side with a German-language version of "Don't Talk to Him", titled "Sag' "no" zu ihm".

== Track listing ==
7": Columbia / DB 7203

1. "I'm the Lonely One" – 2:16
2. "Watch What You Do with My Baby" – 2:04

7": Columbia / C 22 707 (Germany)

1. "Zuviel allein" – 2:16
2. "Sag' "no" zu ihm" – 2:53

== Personnel ==
- Cliff Richard – vocals
- Hank Marvin – lead guitar, backing vocals
- Bruce Welch – rhythm guitar, backing vocals
- John Rostill – bass guitar
- Brian Bennett – drums
- Norrie Paramor – piano

== Charts ==
Chart (1964)	Peak position
Australia (Kent Music Report)	16
Canada (CHUM)	18
Denmark (Danmarks Radio)	5
Finland (Suomen virallinen lista)	9
Germany (GfK)	2
Ireland (IRMA)	9
Netherlands (Single Top 100)	3
Norway (VG-lista)	4
South Africa	1
Sweden (Sverigetopplistan)	13
UK Singles (OCC)	8
US Billboard Hot 100	92
