= Jean-Pierre Danel =

French musical artist

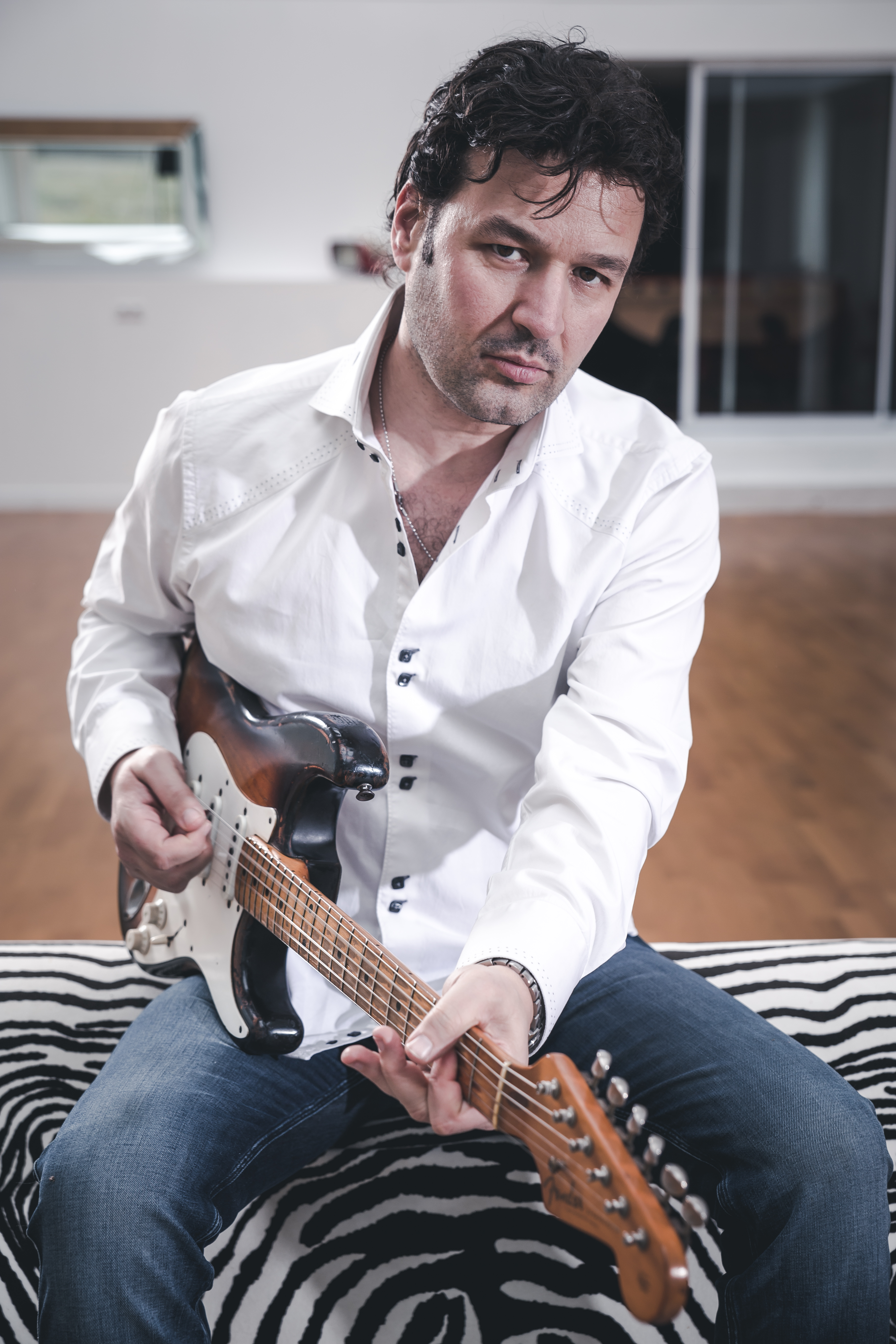

Background information
- Born: 4 June 1968 (age 58); La Varenne, Val-de-Marne, France
- Genres: Blues, blues-rock, hard rock, pop
- Occupations: Musician, songwriter, producer
- Instruments: Guitar, vocals
- Years active: 1982–present
- Label: Sony/BMG
- Website: jeanpierredanel.com

Jean-Pierre Danel (born 4 June 1968) is a French guitarist, record producer, and songwriter. Jean-Pierre Danel has recorded a large number of guitar albums as well as guitar teaching materials. In 2006, his album Guitar Connection, released by Sony BMG, was certified gold in France.

He has received around fifteen gold and platinum records in France [2] and is the best-selling solo guitarist in the country [3]. He has also recorded numerous duets with French and international guitarists and is a record producer whose sales total over 26 million copies. Furthermore, he is the author of a dozen books. He is the son of singer Pascal Danel and author Margit Danel.

== Biography ==
=== 1980s to 1990s ===
Born in La Varenne, Val-de-Marne, France, Jean-Pierre Danel is son of the French pop singer Pascal Danel and the nephew of opera director Jean-Pierre Ponnelle.

Jean-Pierre Danel developed a passion for the guitar at the age of ten and a half after listening to an album by the British band The Shadows. He taught himself the instrument, without lessons or any knowledge of music theory. He became a professional guitarist in 1982 at the age of 14[8] during an initial two-and-a-half-month tour, and the following year began recording in the studio with top French musical teams (musicians who played for Michel Berger, Johnny Hallyday, Francis Cabrel, Céline Dion, etc.). He subsequently released several instrumental guitar albums in the 1980s and 1990s, earning nine gold records[9] in France and, notably, abroad. He founded his own production company at the age of 20 and quickly achieved great success as a producer, all while continuing his career as a guitarist. In 2001, he was featured on the compilation *Masters de la Guitare – Les Plus Grands Guitaristes du Monde* (Masters of the Guitar – The World's Greatest Guitarists) alongside Eric Clapton, B.B. King[10],[11], and Carlos Santana. He went on to receive various awards, including two honors from the Instrumental Rock Guitar Hall of Fame in the USA and the French Grand Prix for Guitar.

=== Stratospheric (2000) ===
In 2001, His album *Stratospheric* was released in 34 countries, won two awards in the United States, and—a few years later—earned a gold record for its international sales..

=== Guitar Connection (2006) ===
In 2006, *Guitar Connection* was released; it topped the sales charts in France for two weeks[12] and was certified gold[13],[14],[15]. *Guitar Connection 2* reached number 8 and also achieved gold status[11], while Volume 3 ranked 18th on the charts[16] and 4th in newsstand sales. Numerous singles also charted, and *Guitar Connection – Tribute to The Shadows* subsequently reached number 6. *The Best of Guitar Connection* was also released, peaking at number 2 in digital sales. The series sold over 450,000 copies in France[17],[18],[19].

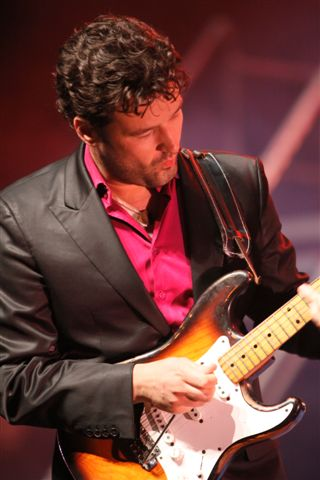
Jean-Pierre Danel

=== Out of the Blues (2010) ===
In 2010, *Out of the Blues* was released—an album of duets featuring Danel and 24 guest artists (including Louis Bertignac, Michael Jones, Axel Bauer, Laurent Voulzy, Hank Marvin[20], Paul Personne, and Nono from Trust). He launched the album alongside Carla Bruni[21],[22]; it reached number 3 on the charts, and both the album and the accompanying DVD were certified gold[23],[24].

In the United States, the composition "The Pink Side of Miss Daisy" charted on Billboard[25],[26], while "Philippine’s Smiles" reached the iTunes charts in the United States (reaching number 12), Great Britain, Israel, Sweden (hitting number 1), France, South America, and elsewhere. Overall, the recordings have charted in 93 countries.

=== The Hit List (2013) ===
Danel's digital compilation album The Hit List debuted on the French compilation albums chart at number 18.

=== Guitar Tribute (2016) ===
On 25 March 2016, Danel released Guitar Tribute (Sony Music), a box set containing 2 CDs (a compilation and a live album) and the DVD of a private live show, All You Need Is Live, which he dedicated to his daughter. Half of the concert consisted of Danel's hits, with two new songs, while the other half was a collection of covers of classics that influenced the guitar player (e.g. The Beatles, The Shadows, Elvis Presley, etc.). Half of the tunes are vocal and several duets are included, as well as video tributes to Danel by Brian May of Queen, Hank Marvin of The Shadows, several French artists, and Sony Music and Warner Music CEOs. To promote his work, Danel embarked on a promotional tour, with a primetime TV show, several other TV appearances, and TV advertising. Guitar Tribute entered the compilation albums chart at number 7 and the DVD All You Need is Live became certified double platinum.

In 2017, after Génération Guitare: a double album with guitarist Jean-Félix Lalanne, Sony Music released an anthology featuring a 10-CD box set called Guitar Player, which includes 214 of Danel's recordings, selected from his various albums.

In 2019, a rose was named after him. In 2020, a documentary was announced and a biography was published. His album Côté Jazz reached the top of the Jazz Albums Chart in France.

That summer, Sony released *Guitar Player* [41], a 10-CD anthology featuring 214 tracks. In 2018, Jean-Pierre Danel filmed the *Guitar Story* TV special; released in 2020, it achieved gold record status [42]. Three singles—"Skywalking," "Speed Limit," and "Je m'en fous" (a duet with his father featuring his daughter)—charted on the sales lists. In the spring, a "Jean-Pierre Danel" rose was created [43], and he received a lifetime achievement award in Monaco.

Christophe Malavoy provided the narration for a feature-length documentary in which more than seventy prominent figures discussed Jean-Pierre Danel's career [44], including Brian May, Laurent Voulzy, journalists (such as Harry Roselmack), media executives (TF1, Skyrock), heads of major record labels (Sony, Warner), and the president of SACEM. A biography titled *Guitar Hero Made in France* was subsequently published about him [45].

=== Guitar Story (2020) and Guitar Safari (2022) ===
In 2021, he released the TV special Guitar Story on DVD. His album and DVD Hats Off to the Boys was then released in several countries. His DVD Guitar Video Connection, celebrating 40 years of his career, was released in 2022, and a triple album, Guitar Safari, was released at the same time. To celebrate 40 years of recording, a new album, a best-of album, and a live album were also released.

In the spring of 2024, Jean-Pierre Danel released a new single, "Spicy Marie," marking a musical shift for him as the composition blended his rock guitar style with dance music production. The track reached number 8 on the Club 40—a chart of the most-played club tracks compiled by SNEP and Yacast[54]—and hit number 1 on the Top Electro chart. He followed this with a series of club-oriented singles—both instrumental and vocal, such as "Guitar Club," "Love U (Yes I Do)," "Rocket Girl," "Electric Polaroid," and "Get Me Now"—which all reached number 1 on the national Top Electro chart (with one exception peaking at number 2) and placed in the top 3 of the general chart; notably, "Will We Meet Again?" reached number 1 on both the general chart and the Top Electro chart in May 2026 (https://www.club40.fr/), (week of July 3). His album *Guitar on the Dancefloor* was released on vinyl exclusively via Amazon, where it topped the sales charts (https://www.larep.fr/bazoches-sur-le-betz-45210/actualites/de-belles-emotions-pour-jean-pierre-danel_14797248/).

In August 2026, his single "4 Ever and Ever"—a number 1 hit on the Top Electro chart—won the award for Best Electro Track at the InterContinental Music Awards in Los Angeles.

In 2025, his vocal composition "Love U (Yes I Do)" charted on the French Club chart, peaking at number 6 in April and May (weeks 17 and 19, April and May 2025), while each of its two remixes reached number 2 on different weeks on the Electro national charts.

== Puzzle Productions ==
Jean-Pierre Danel is considered one of France's most important independent record producers[11],[7],[55],[56]. He founded the company Puzzle Productions in 1989, becoming the youngest French producer at the time. He states: "There are records I produced in the studio where I was at the controls, and then there is the catalog of recordings built through song rights I acquired over the years; this represents more than 18,000 tracks, including works by Elvis Presley, Brassens, and Stone & Charden..."

He has worked across multiple musical genres, including pop, jazz, classical, dance, and children's music, with recordings distributed through major record labels. He has also worked as a music publisher, collaborating with artists such as Johnny Hallyday and on productions including the show Les Années Twist. Through Puzzle Productions, he acquired the master recordings of thousands of songs and remastered and reissued them. His catalog comprises more than 18,000 tracks, including his own productions and recording rights acquired from more than 900 artists.

He also produced remixes for various international artists, such as Madonna, Moby, and Daft Punk. He was responsible for launching the first budget-priced collection from a major label—priced at half the cost of the low-price CDs available at the time—during the late 1990s. He sold millions of copies of these releases.

This marked a major shift for the music industry, establishing a category of records that has since been adopted by all major labels in Europe.

In May 2014, marking his 25-year career as a producer, he was presented with a multi-diamond award at Sony Music for 23 million records sold[7] and the 191 gold and platinum records he had received up to that point[58],[59],[60],[61]. In 2024, he received a second award—marking his company's 35th anniversary—for 26,400,000 records sold and 207 gold and platinum-certified records.

== Writer ==
Danel is also the author of several books, the best known of which are biographies of French playwright and actor Sacha Guitry. His second book about Guitry is featured on the book list for French students at Berkeley University, CA.

In 2023, he published a biography of French theater star Sarah Bernhardt. Danel also published a book in 2012 about the Fender Stratocaster (foreword by Hank Marvin). In 2014, he released the video "The Fender Stratocaster Story", based on the book and on his vast collection of guitars, in which can be found "Miss Daisy", a scarce 1954 pre-production Stratocaster worth US$250,000.

== Charities ==
Danel produced records to the benefit of various charities, including Amnesty International and for AIDS.

A vegetarian and animal lover, Danel launched Guitar Players for Animal Rights to the benefit of PETA, and was joined by fellow guitarists Brian May (of Queen), Steve Lukather (of Toto), Hank Marvin (of The Shadows), as well as French stars such as singer and composer/producer for Celine Dion, Jean-Jacques Goldman, and French movie star Jean-Paul Belmondo.

In 2012, he was one of around forty artists who signed a call in support of marriage equality[75]. A vegetarian since childhood[76], he launched a charity campaign for animal rights in 2013; he was joined by Brian May (of Queen)[77] and Hank Marvin[78], and received support from Paul McCartney.

He has also initiated numerous charitable campaigns—supporting causes such as Amnesty International, UNICEF, children with cancer, AIDS and polio research, underprivileged children (alongside Jamel Debbouze), the SPA (with Jean-Paul Belmondo, Michael Jones, and Jean-Jacques Goldman), as well as Les Petits Frères des Pauvres and refugees from the war in Ukraine.

== Discography ==
=== Albums ===
Charting albums

Full list

- Chorus (1993)
- Remember Shadows (1994)
- Guitar Generation (1995)
- Le Meilleur Des Shadows (1995)
- Guitar Line (1997)
- Plays 18 Hits of the Shadows (1997)
- Tribute to the Shadows 40 Years (2 CD, 40 tracks, 1998)
- Les Années Shadows (2 CD, 46 titres, 1998)
- The Best of the Guitar Legends (Vol. 1 to 3, 75 tracks, 1998)
- A Tribute to the Shadows – The Gold Series (1998)
- Guitar Greatest (2 CD, 2000)
- La Légende Des Shadows (2000)
- The Guitar Album (2000)
- Stratospheric (2000)
- Plays Hits of the Shadows (2000)
- The Playback Collection (Vol. 1 to 4, 2001)
- Guitarmania (4 CD, 88 tracks, 2001)
- Nuits Parisiennes (2001)
- A Tribute to the Shadows (vol. 1 to 4, 80 tracks, 2000–2001)
- Guitar Classics (2002)
- Guitar Gold Themes (2002)
- The Shadows' Anthology – The Tribute Album by Jean-Pierre Danel (2002)
- Essential Guitar (2002)
- All The Best (2 CD, 2002)
- Guitare (5 CD, 100 Titres, 2003)
- Guitar Greatest Hits (2005)
- Guitar Connection (2006)
- Guitar Connection 2 (2007)
- Guitar Connection 3 (2008)
- The Best of Guitar Connection (2009)
- Guitar Connection Anthology (2009)
- Out of the Blues (Duet album) (CD + DVD) (2010)
- When the Guitar Rocks (2011)
- Guitar Guitar Guitar (2011)
- Guitar Anthology (100 titres) (2011)
- The Blues Album (2012)
- Guitar Greatest Hits (2012)
- The Greatest Guitar Hits (2012)
- The Best of Guitar (2012)
- The Best of Jean-Pierre Danel (2012)
- The Hit List (2013)
- Guitar Greatest Hits (2014) (3-CD metal box)
- Guitar Tribute (2016) (Box set, 2 CDs + DVD)
- All You Need Is Live (2016) (DVD)
- Génération Guitare (with Jean-Félix Lalanne; double album) (2017)
- Guitar Player (10-CD anthology box set; 214 tracks) (2017)
- Guitar Story TV Special (DVD) (2020)
- Côté Jazz (2020)
- Les Notes Bleues (2020)
- All the Jazz (2021) (compilation)
- Guitar Safari (2022)
- Guitar on the Dancefloor (2025)

JEAN-PIERRE DANEL - CLASSEMENTS AU TOP DES VENTES EN FRANCE (SNEP/IFOP)

31 ALBUMS / 5 DVD

ALBUMS/DVD

Chorus #25 -

Remember Shadows #34 -

Guitar Line #61 Argent

Les années Shadows #7 (kiosques)

Tribute to The Shadows #135 -

Guitar Connection #1

Guitar Connection 2 #8

Guitar Connection 3 #18 / #4 (kiosques)

Guitar Connection - Tribute To The Shadows #6

The Best Of Guitar Connection #23

Jean-Pierre Danel Plays The Shadows #38 -

Guitar Connection Anthology #19 (kiosques)

Guitar Connection (ré-entrée) #7 (Digital) -

Guitar Connection (2 ré-entrée) #33 (Digital) -

Guitar Connection 3 (ré-entrée) #26 (Digital) -

The Best Of Guitar Connection (ré-entrée) #2 (Digital) -

Out of the Blues #3

Out of the Blues (DVD) #3 (kiosques)

When the Guitar Rocks #9 -

Guitar, Guitar, Guitar #14 -

Stratospheric #46 -

Rock Guitar Legends #117 -

Guitar Tribute #7 / #1 (Digital) -

All You Need Is Live ! (DVD) #1 (kiosques et Digital)

Génération Guitare (avec Jean-Félix Lalanne) #7 (Compilations) / #60 (Albums) -

Côté Jazz #1 Jazz / #3 (Digital) -

Jazz Guitar #15 (Jazz) -

Guitar Story TV Special (DVD) #5 (kiosques)

The Hit List #1 (Back Catalogue) / #5 (Digital) -

The Gold Collection #11 (Back Catalogue) / #63 (Digital) -

Rock Guitar (The Classics) #12 (Back Catalogue) / #66 (Digital) -

The Best Of Jean-Pierre DANEL #1 (Back Catalogue) / #10 (Digital) -

The Pink Side Of Miss Daisy (L’album) #2 (Back Catalogue) / #22 (Digital) -

Music for Driving #39 -

Hats Off to the Boys (DVD) #8 (kiosques)

Les Notes Bleues #9 (Jazz) / #18 (Digital) -

All That Jazz ! #10 (Jazz) -

Guitar Video Connection - 40 ans de Musique (DVD) #1 (kiosques)

Guitar Safari - 40 ans de Musique #1 (kiosques)

Guitar on the Dancefloor #1 (Vinyles - Exclusivité Amazon) -

SINGLES

Chez Toi et Moi #78 (Airplay) -

A Love Theme... #15 -

Sleepwalk #18 -

Ballad For A Friend #39 -

NZ Girl Blues #5 -

My Song Of You (Duo avec Laurent Voulzy) #7 -

Guitar Connection Medley (Part.1) #13 -

Nivram (Duo avec Hank Marvin) #15 -

The Pink Side Of Miss Daisy #9 / #4 (Kiosques)

Honky Tonk Woman #18 -

The Rise and Fall of Flingel Bunt #43 -

Good Guitar Vibrations #20 -

Come Together #21 -

Concerto de Aranjuez #30 -

While My Guitar Gently Weeps (Duo avec P. Danel) #29 -

Out Of The Blues #20 -

Rock me Baby (Duo avec Axel Bauer) #36 -

Shazam ( Duo avec Jean-Félix Lalanne) #173 -

Skywalking #54 -

Je m’en Fous (Duo avec Pascal Danel, Feat Philippine Danel) #39 -

Ce Petit Chemin #55 -

Speed Limit #22 -

Philippine’s Smiles (Live) #26 -

Blue Nocturne #40 -

This Incredible Fortune To Be Two (Trio avec L. Bertignac et Beverly Jo Scott) #46 -

Shadoogie (Duo avec Pascal Danel) (Live) #92 -

Johnny B. Goode #87 -

Hound Dog (Live) #84 -

Medley Lucille/Rip it Up/Blue Suede Shoes (Live) #80 -

Look my Way (Duo avec Jake Shimabukuro) #52 -

Indian Horse #48 -

Guitar Safari #47 -

Spicy Marie (Redrums Bassline Mix) #8 (Clubs) -

Spicy Marie (Hot Nurse Mix) #1 (Electro) -

Guitar Club #11 (Clubs) -

Guitar Club (Green Eyed Girl Mix) #2 (Electro) -

Love U (Yes I do) (Radio Edit) #1 (Clubs) -

Love U (Yes I do) (Electro Mix) #2 (Electro) -

Love U (Yes I do) (Shatta Mix) #2 (Electro) -

Love U (Yes I do) (Double Kisses Mix) #1 (Electro) -

Rocket Girl (Radio Edit) #2 (Clubs) -

Rocket Girl (House Vocal Mix) #1 (Electro) -

Rocket Girl (Afro Vocal Mix) #2 (Electro) -

4 Ever and Ever (Super Nu Disco Remix) #1 (Electro) -

4 Ever and Ever (Radio Edit) #3 (Clubs) -

4 Ever and Ever (Afro House Remix) #2 (Electro) -

4 Ever and Ever (Latino House Remix) #2 (Electro) -

4 Ever and Ever (Disco House Remix) #3 (Electro) -

Ce que tu voudras (40e Anniversaire) (Exclusivité Amazon) #1 -

Will we meet again ? (Radio Edit) #1 (Clubs) -

Will we meet again ? (Nu Disco Mix) #1 (Electro) -

Will we meet again ? (Afro Mix) #1 (Electro) -

Will we meet again ? (Private Mix) #1 (Electro) -

Electric Polaroid (Afro House Remix) #5 (Electro) –

Electric Polaroid (Nu Disco Mix) #8 (Electro) -

Electric Polaroid (Radio Edit) #11 (Clubs) –

=== Participation ===
- Les Masters De La Guitare – Les Plus Grands Guitaristes (1 track among other guitar players) (2001)

== Books ==
- Femme, mode d'emploi : la femme vue par les hommes : 3000 citations par plus de 500 auteurs (édité par Jean-Pierre Danel), éditions NM7, Paris, 2000, 313 p. ISBN 2-913973-09-4 BnF 377101648
- Le destin fabuleux de Sacha Guitry, éditions Marque-Pages, coll. « Beaux livres », 2007, 269 p. ISBN 978-2915397147
- Chroniques d'une vie passionnante : enfin, je crois : journal pour de vrai d'un futur papa dans les ennuis, Courcelles publishing, Paris, 2008, 288 p., ISBN 978-2-916569-26-0, BnF 41237809k
- Petites explications sur les femmes à l'attention des hommes perdus et désespérés : près de 2,700 citations sur les femmes par plus de 800 auteurs (réunies par Jean-Pierre Danel), Courcelles publishing, Paris, 2008, 317 p. ISBN 978-2-916569-31-4 BnF 413696993
- 365 moyens de se faire pardonner, enfin, de tenter d'essayer : petit guide à l'attention des hommes qui ont gaffé, et s'ils l'ont pas fait exprès, eh ben c'est grave quand même !, Courcelles publishing, Paris, 2010, 92 p. ISBN 978-2-916569-34-5 BnF 42136792d
- 365 moyens d'adopter le life style des people : et de devenir hyper-intéressant chez son coiffeur, Courcelles publishing, Paris, 2010, 93 p. ISBN 978-2-916569-35-2 BnF 421367734
- 365 moyens de rendre son homme heureux : tout ce qu'il faut dire, faire et savoir pour que votre homme ronronne de bonheur ! : petit guide à l'attention des femmes optimistes et motivées, Courcelles publishing, Paris, 2010, 92 p. ISBN 978-2-916569-36-9 BnF 421367854
- Elvis Presley : La légende du king, Courcelles Publishing, Paris, janvier 2010 ISBN 978-2-916569-37-6
- Légende de la Fender Stratocaster , Auteurs du Monde, préface de Hank Marvin, septembre 2012 ISBN 979-10-91301-12-1
- Elvis Presley intime : L'icône perdue (avec un CD audio), Editions Contre-dires, Décembre 2013 ISBN 9782849333839
- Miss Daisy : Le graal de la Fender Stratocaster Auteurs du Monde, octobre 2020
- Cordes Sensibles – Un guitariste au pays du show business Auteurs du Monde, préface de Gilbert Mitterrand, juin 2021
- Sarah Bernhardt : La Belle Etoile Auteurs du Monde, avril 2023
