= Pete Chester =

English drummer and songwriter

Peter Charles 'Pete' Chester (born 9 September 1941) is an English drummer and songwriter. He is the son of comedian and broadcaster Charlie Chester.

== Career ==
Chester started his career by forming the band The Five Chesternuts with Hank Marvin and Bruce Welch in 1957, who released the unsuccessful single "Teenage Love" on the Columbia label and appeared on the Six-Five Special on BBC television. Marvin and Welch left in 1958 to join Cliff Richard and The Drifters, the forerunner of what became Cliff Richard and The Shadows the following year. Chester had a UK hit record in 1960, "Ten Swingin' Bottles" which reached the NME and Record Mirror charts.

In 1959, Welch visited Chester and asked him if he had any songs, as everybody was songwriting at the time. They went through his list of songs and found "Please Don't Tease", which Chester had just written, and they worked on it together. Welch eventually sang it to Richard, who recorded it. It went to number one for three weeks in 1960.

Chester's song "Left Out Again", and "Tell Me", written with Bruce Welch, appeared on Richard's album Me and My Shadows, released later in 1960. The first single released under The Shadows' name was "Saturday Dance", written by Chester and Hank Marvin.
