= Le QuecumBar =

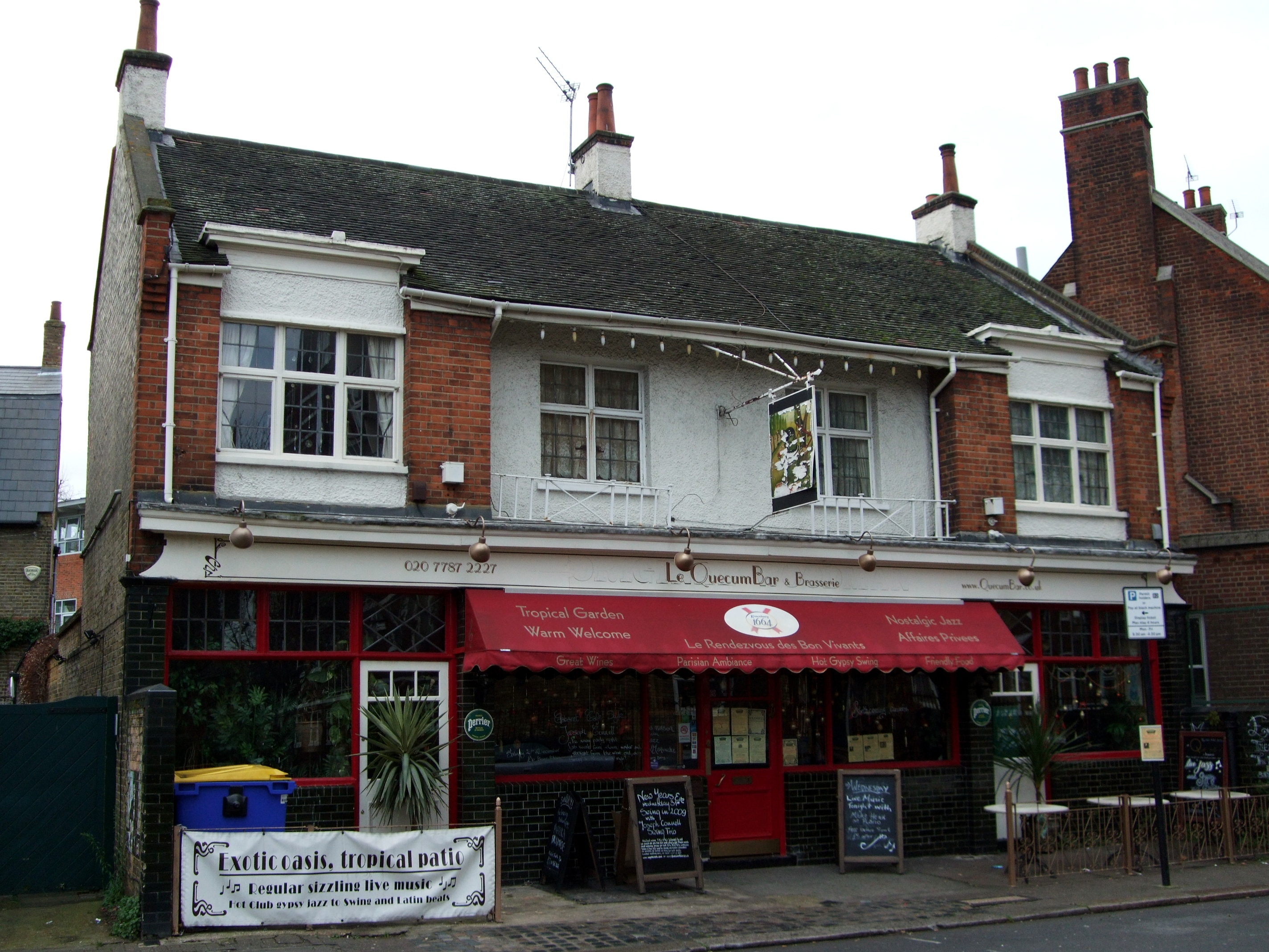
- Front view of the venue

- Location within Greater London

General information
- Type: Music venue, brasserie
- Location: Battersea; London, SW11; United Kingdom
- Coordinates: 51°28′26″N 0°10′25″W

Website
- www.quecumbar.co.uk

Le QuecumBar was a music venue and brasserie in Battersea, London, England dedicated to Gypsy Swing and the music of Django Reinhardt.

== History ==
The venue originally opened in 1841 as The Woodman, a typical London pub, before being renamed as "The Original Woodman" in 1860 due to a pub with the same name opening nearby by Manns, the same brewery. It featured regular live music and concerts by Gypsy Swing musicians, including Fapy Lafertin. Johnny Depp visited the venue in order to study the character of Roux in the film Chocolat.

== Closure ==
After 19 years of operation, Le QuecumBar closed its doors on 6 April 2022. The owner cited financial pressures, including rising rents and the ongoing impact of the COVID-19 pandemic, as contributing factors to the venue's closure.

== Le Q Records ==
The independent record label owned by Le QuecumBar specializes in live recordings of bands that have performed at the venue. The Shadows' Hank Marvin has appeared on live recordings, and the venue's recording of 'When I Was A Boy' by Biel Ballester was featured on the soundtrack of Woody Allen's film, Vicky Cristina Barcelona. The Angelo Debarre quartet have recorded a live album at the venue, which was released on Lejazzetal records.
