= The Day I Met Marie =

- Cover of the single released in the Netherlands

Single by Cliff Richard
- B-side: "Our Story Book"
- Released: 11 August 1967
- Recorded: 1 June 1967
- Studio: EMI Studios, London
- Genre: Baroque pop
- Length: 2:17
- Label: Columbia
- Songwriter: Hank Marvin
- Producer: Norrie Paramor

Cliff Richard singles chronology
"I'll Come Runnin'" (1967)	"The Day I Met Marie" (1967)	"All My Love (Solo Tu)" (1967)

"The Day I Met Marie" is a song by Cliff Richard, released as single in August 1967. The song was written by Hank Marvin and produced by Norrie Paramor.

It reached number 10 on singles chart in both the UK and Ireland, number 5 in Australia, number 4 in New Zealand and number 7 in the Netherlands.

In an era when singles were often not included on studio albums, the track was not included in any of Richard's albums at the time. The first album it was released on was Richard's 1969 compilation The Best of Cliff. It has been included on numerous compilations since, including 40 Golden Greats in 1977, Love Songs in 1981, The Whole Story: His Greatest Hits in 2000, The 50th Anniversary Album in 2008 and 75 at 75 in 2015. A live version with the Shadows is also included on the 1979 live album Thank You Very Much.

The song was covered by the Shadows in their album, From Hank, Bruce, Brian and John, in 1967.

== Track listing ==
1. "The Day I Met Marie" (2:16)
2. "Our Story Book" (2:31)

== Charts ==
Chart (1967)	Peak position
Australia (Go-Set)	7
Australia (Kent Music Report)	5
Denmark (Danmarks Radio)	10
Ireland (IRMA)	10
Netherlands (Dutch Top 40)	8
Netherlands (Single Top 100)	7
New Zealand (Listener)	4
Rhodesia (Lyons Maid)	9
UK Singles (OCC)	10
