= 21st Century Christmas =

- Artwork for the download edition

Single by Cliff Richard
- A-side: "Move It" (2006 version)
- Released: 11 December 2006
- Recorded: 2006
- Studio: Stanley House Studios, London
- Genre: Christmas, Pop
- Length: 4:00
- Label: EMI
- Songwriter(s): Ralph Murphy, Paul Brady
- Producer(s): Chris Porter

Cliff Richard singles chronology
"What Car?" (2005)	"21st Century Christmas" / "Move It" (2006)	"When I Need You" (2007)

"21st Century Christmas" is a 2006 Christmas song released by Cliff Richard. It was released as a double A-side single alongside a new version of Richard's first hit "Move It" (featuring Queen guitarist Brian May).

Richard had achieved a UK number one single in each of the previous five decades, but not one in the sixth decade. The promotional release spruiked the opportunity that "Cliff has a great chance to make it to No 1 with this single - and it would ensure his record of No. 1 single in 6 consecutive decades becomes virtually unassailable." However, the single fell just short, reaching No. 2 on the UK Singles Chart.

The track was not included on Richard's contemporaneous album release, Two's Company - The Duets (given it was not a duet), but was included on Richard's subsequent compilation albums, The 50th Anniversary Album (2008) and 75 at 75 (2015).

== Charts ==
Chart (2006)	Peak position
Denmark (Tracklisten)	18
Europe (Eurochart Hot 100)	10
Scotland (OCC)	2
UK Singles (OCC)	2
UK Physical Singles (OCC)	1
