= Miss You Nights =

1975 single by Cliff Richard

- Sleeve of 1982 UK re-release

Single by Cliff Richard

from the album I'm Nearly Famous
- B-side: "Love Enough"
- Released: 14 November 1975
- Recorded: 9 September 1975
- Studio: Abbey Road
- Genre: Pop
- Length: 3:57
- Label: EMI
- Songwriter: Dave Townsend
- Producer: Bruce Welch

Cliff Richard singles chronology
"Honky Tonk Angel" (1975)	"Miss You Nights" (1975)	"Devil Woman" (1976)

Music video
- "Miss You Nights on YouTube

"Miss You Nights" is a song written by Dave Townsend and made famous worldwide by Cliff Richard. It has been recorded by numerous other artists, most notably Westlife, who released it as the second track on a double A-side single in 2003. The Westlife version reached number 3 on the UK singles chart.

== Background ==
Dave Townsend wrote the song in 1974 whilst his girlfriend was away on holiday. He recorded it on an album for Island Records, but the label shelved the album and decided to recoup part of the cost of the unreleased album through cover deals. Some demo tapes were handed to Bruce Welch of the Shadows, who worked as producer for Cliff Richard and was looking for songs to revitalize his career. Welch immediately recognized it as a hit: "Andrew Powell's string arrangement helped to make it a great love song through its imagery and potent feelings of longing and loneliness". Welch and Richard recorded it in September 1975. Of the song and its writer, Richard said: "I think it's one of the nicest songs I've ever made... when I heard his version it was terrific. He [Townsend] was pleased to have that happen. I mean it could have been anybody and it would have been a hit."

== Original release ==
Cliff Richard released "Miss You Nights" on 14 November 1975 as the lead single from his studio album I'm Nearly Famous. In March 1976, it reached No. 15 on the UK singles chart.

Chart performance

Chart	Peak position
UK Singles (Official Charts)	15
Australia (Kent Music Report)	100
Belgium (Ultratop 50 Flanders)	17
Belgium (Ultratop 50 Wallonia)	42
Netherlands (Single Top 100)	10
South Africa (Springbok Radio)	2

Album appearances

"Miss You Nights" was first included on Richard's 1976 studio album I'm Nearly Famous. As one of his most enduring songs, it has been included on many of his compilation albums. The most notable of these compilation albums and albums with alternative versions are:

- 1977: 40 Golden Greats
- 1979: Thank You Very Much (1978 live version)
- 1981: Love Songs
- 1983: Dressed for the Occasion (1982 live version with the Royal Philharmonic Orchestra)
- 1990: From a Distance: The Event box-set edition. An a cappella version with Coro Croz Corona (choir) was included on a single-sided 7" vinyl record.
- 1994: The Hit List
- 2005: From a Distance: The Event (1989 live version, but only included on the 2005 re-release containing the full original live concert track-listing)
- 2008: The 50th Anniversary Album
- 2015: 75 at 75
- 2018: Rise Up (original vocals with new backing by the Royal Philharmonic Orchestra)

== Cliff Richard 1994 re-release ==
"Miss You Nights (remix)"

Single by Cliff Richard

from the album The Hit List
- A-side: "All I Have to Do Is Dream" (double A-side)
- Released: 28 November 1994
- Recorded: 9 September 1975 (remixed 1994)
- Label: EMI
- Songwriter: Dave Townsend
- Producer: Bruce Welch

Cliff Richard singles chronology
"Healing Love" (1993)	"Miss You Nights (remix)" (1994)	"Misunderstood Man" (1995)

In 1994, Cliff Richard re-released the song on a double A-side single with "All I Have to Do Is Dream", which was listed first. "All I Have to Do Is Dream", originally by The Everly Brothers was recorded as a live duet with Phil Everly, while "Miss You Nights" is a remix of the 1976 original. The double A-side single reached #14 in the UK singles chart.

Track list:

CD1:

1. "All I Have to Do Is Dream"
2. "Miss You Nights"
3. "When Will I Be Loved"
4. "Tribute to the Legends - Medley"

CD2:

1. "All I Have to Do Is Dream"
2. "Miss You Nights"
3. "True Love Ways"
4. "Party Megamix"

Chart performance

Chart	Peak position
Australian Singles Chart (ARIA)	93
UK Singles (Official Charts)	14

== Westlife version ==
"Miss You Nights"

Single by Westlife

from the album Unbreakable – The Greatest Hits Volume 1
- A-side: "Tonight" (double A-side)
- Released: 23 March 2003
- Recorded: 2002
- Studio: Rokstone Studios, London
- Genre: Pop
- Length: 3:09
- Label: BMG
- Songwriter: Dave Townsend
- Producer: Steve Mac

Westlife singles chronology
"Unbreakable" (2002)	"Tonight" / "Miss You Nights" (2003)	"Hey Whatever" (2003)

Music video
- "Miss You Nights" on YouTube

Westlife released "Tonight" and "Miss You Nights" together in 2003 as a double A-side single in the United Kingdom (with "Tonight" listed first). However it was "Tonight" rather than "Miss You Nights" that received most of the radio airplay. The single reached number 3 in both the UK and Scotland. In all other countries where the single charted, only "Tonight" is listed as the charting track. In some countries "Miss You Nights" was excluded from the single altogether.

The song was composed in the traditional verse–chorus form in A major and in this rendition Filan, McFadden and Feehily's vocal ranges from the chords of E_{4} to B_{5}.

Chart performance

Chart	Peak position
Europe (Eurochart Hot 100)	14
Scottish Singles Sales (Official Charts)	3
UK Singles (Official Charts)	3

== Other versions ==
Cliff Richard also recorded two more versions of the song as duets:

- 2004: With Elaine Paige, included on her album Centre Stage: The Very Best of Elaine Paige
- 2005: With G4 on their album G4 & Friends, later also included on Cliff Richard's 2006 album Two's Company - The Duets

Other covers include:

- 1976: Diane Solomon on her album Mixed Feelings
- 1977: Marie Osmond on her album This Is the Way That I Feel
- 1978: Dobie Gray on his album Midnight Diamond
- 1979: Art Garfunkel on his album Fate for Breakfast
- 1979: The Nolans on their album Nolan Sisters
- 1980: Demis Roussos on his album Man of the World
- 1980: Roger Whittaker on his album You Are My Miracle
- 1981: Brotherhood of Man on their album 20 Disco Greats / 20 Love Songs
- 1982: Carl Wayne with Choral Union
- 1983: Acker Bilk
- 1990: Johnny Logan & The Jordanaires single from Logan's album Love Songs
- 1996: Randy VanWarmer on his album Sun, Moon & Stars
- 2001: Smokie on their album Uncovered Too
- 2005: Rick Springfield on his album The Day After Yesterday
