= Thank You for a Lifetime =

Single by Cliff Richard

from the album The 50th Anniversary Album
- B-side: "Mobile Alabama School Leaving Hullabaloo" (1978, previously unreleased)
- Released: 8 September 2008
- Recorded: 2008
- Genre: Pop
- Label: EMI
- Songwriters: Jez Ashurst; Charles Grant; Peter Woodroffe

Cliff Richard singles chronology
"When I Need You" (2007)	"Thank You for a Lifetime" (2008)	"Singing the Blues" (2009)

"Thank You for a Lifetime" is a 2008 pop single by Cliff Richard to coincide with the 50th anniversary of his music career. The single release reached No. 3 on the UK Singles Chart. The song is a tribute to his fans, and features the line "I gave you a lifetime, you gave me the time of my life". It was written by Charlie Grant, Jez Ashurst and Pete Woodroffe. As of November 2022, it remains his last UK Top 10 hit.

== Charts ==
Chart (2008)	Peak position
Europe (Eurochart Hot 100)	13
Scotland Singles (OCC)	1
UK Singles (OCC)	3
UK Physical Singles (OCC)	1
