= All My Love (Solo Tu) =

- Cover of the single released in the Netherlands

Single by Cliff Richard
- B-side: "Sweet Little Jesus Boy"
- Released: 10 November 1967
- Recorded: 5 October 1967
- Studio: EMI Studios, London
- Genre: Pop
- Length: 2:55
- Label: Columbia
- Songwriter(s): Federico Monti Arduini; Peter Callander
- Producer(s): Norrie Paramor

Cliff Richard singles chronology
"The Day I Met Marie" (1967)	"All My Love" (1967)	"Congratulations" (1968)

"Solo tu" ("Only You") is a song by Italian singer Orietta Berti, released as a single in April 1967. Whilst it did not chart, it was a finalist in that year's summer festival Un disco per l'estate. The song became better known after it was adapted into English as "All My Love", and covered by Cliff Richard later in 1967.

== Cliff Richard version ==
"All My Love" was adapted into English by Peter Callander and was first recorded by Cilla Black in August 1967, though her version was not released until 1997 on the compilation album 1963–1973: The Abbey Road Decade. Cliff Richard recorded his version in October 1967 and was chosen for release as a single the following month in favour of another Cilla Black song "I Only Live to Love You". It reached number 6 on the UK Singles Chart and also performed well in other countries.

The single's B-side, "Sweet Little Jesus Boy", is a spiritual Christmas song from 1934 written by Robert MacGimsey. It was first Christian song released by Richard. Richard also recorded a German-language version of "All My Love" titled "Sternengold" in March 1968, which was released on the Germany-only compilation album Congratulations und 13 weitere Hits.

=== Reception ===
Reviewing the single for Record Mirror, Peter Jones described it as "a soft, vibrant ballad, very sentimental, sung with great charm. It's all very dreamy and romantic and the backing is just right". Derek Johnson for the New Musical Express added that "it is so commercial and so very well done that – bearing in mind Engelbert's success – I wouldn't be surprised to see it go to No. 1". However, Penny Valentine for Disc and Music Echo was not as complementary, writing that "Cliff sounds as though he is singing in the wrong key", but praised "the commercial aspect of the whole thing [that] hits you when the first chorus comes in".

=== Charts ===
Chart (1967–68)	Peak position
Australia (Go-Set)	10
Australia (Kent Music Report)	9
Belgium (Ultratop 50 Flanders)	3
Belgium (Ultratop 50 Wallonia)	16
Denmark (Danmarks Radio)	9
Ireland (IRMA)	8
Japan (Oricon Singles Chart)	67
Netherlands (Dutch Top 40)	11
Netherlands (Single Top 100)	12
New Zealand (Listener)	5
Rhodesia (Lyons Maid)	5
Singapore (Radio Singapore)	1
South Africa (Springbok Radio)	3
Spain (Promusicae)	20
UK Singles (OCC)	6
