= Nine Times Out of Ten =

1960 single by Cliff Richard and the Shadows

Single by Cliff Richard and the Shadows
- B-side: "Thinking of Our Love"
- Released: 16 September 1960
- Recorded: 15 March 1960
- Studio: EMI Studios, London
- Genre: Rock and roll
- Length: 2:07
- Label: Columbia
- Songwriters: Waldense Hall; Otis Blackwell
- Producer: Norrie Paramor

Cliff Richard and the Shadows singles chronology
"Please Don't Tease" (1960)	"Nine Times Out of Ten" (1960)	"I Love You" (1960)

"Nine Times Out of Ten" is a song by Cliff Richard and the Shadows, released as a single in September 1960. It peaked at number 3 on the UK Singles Chart and also received a silver disc for 250,000 sales.

== Background and release ==
In a vote by a panel of teenagers to decide from a selection of Richard's unreleased tracks which ones should be released as singles, "Nine Times Out of Ten" came second to "Please Don't Tease. Both Richard and his producer Norrie Paramor thought "Nine Times Out of Ten" would be the number one choice, as they both preferred the song.

"Nine Times Out of Ten" was co-written by American rock and roll influence Otis Blackwell, known for co-writing songs such as "Great Balls of Fire", "All Shook Up" and "Fever". The B-side, "Thinking of Our Love", was written by the Shadows' Bruce Welch and Hank Marvin "at three o'clock in the morning in Oklahoma City". The single set a new record for the number of advance sales of the single in the UK, with around 180,000 sales, and went straight in at number 3 on the UK Singles Chart.

Upon the release of "Nine Times Out of Ten", Richard was described as making "a surprise return to rock 'n' roll" and a "break from the beaty ballads that have kept Cliff in the charts". However, Richard said at the time that he was "giving [his] fans what they have been asking for".

== Reception ==
Reviewing for Disc, Don Nicholl wrote that "Nine Times Out of Ten" "doesn't quite measure up to some of his previous work", blaming the timing of its release. He described it as a "very fast rocker written in the Presley idiom and it seems to be somewhat dated to me". Nicholl also wrote that "Thinking of Our Love" is a "quieter number" with "considerable charm in the gentle melody".

== Track listing ==
1. "Nine Times Out of Ten" – 2:07
2. "Thinking of Our Love" – 2:38

== Personnel ==
- Cliff Richard – vocals
- Hank Marvin – lead guitar
- Bruce Welch – rhythm guitar
- Jet Harris – bass guitar
- Tony Meehan – drums

== Charts ==
Chart (1960–61)	Peak position
Australia (Kent Music Report)	29
Belgium (Ultratop 50 Flanders)	13
Belgium (Ultratop 50 Wallonia)	33
India (The Voice, Calcutta)	10
Ireland (Evening Herald)	3
New Zealand (Lever Hit Parade)	4
Norway (VG-lista)	7
UK Singles (OCC)	3
