= On the Beach (Cliff Richard song) =

1964 single by Cliff Richard and the Shadows

Single by Cliff Richard and the Shadows

from the album Wonderful Life
- B-side: "A Matter of Moments"
- Released: 26 June 1964
- Recorded: 5 November 1963
- Studio: EMI Studios
- Length: Surf rock
- Label: Columbia
- Songwriters: Bruce Welch; Hank Marvin; Cliff Richard
- Producer: Norrie Paramor

Cliff Richard and the Shadows singles chronology
"Constantly" (1964)	"On the Beach" (1964)	"The Twelfth of Never" (1964)

"On the Beach" is a 1964 hit song by Cliff Richard and the Shadows. It was taken from and released in the lead up to the release of the film Wonderful Life and its soundtrack. It become an international hit for Richard, reaching number 7 in the UK Singles Chart and charting in Australia (No. 4), Ireland (No. 6), Norway (No. 4), South Africa (No. 2) and Sweden (No. 12).

== Track listing ==
7": Columbia / DB 7305

1. "On the Beach" – 2:58
2. "A Matter of Moments" – 2:56

== Personnel ==
- Cliff Richard – vocals
- Hank Marvin – lead guitar, backing vocals
- Bruce Welch – rhythm guitar, backing vocals
- Brian Locking – bass guitar
- Brian Bennett – drums

== Chart performance ==
Chart (1964)	Peak position
Australia (Kent Music Report)	4
Belgium (Ultratop 50 Flanders)	10
Belgium (Ultratop 50 Wallonia)	49
Hong Kong	6
Ireland (IRMA)	6
Malaysia (Radio Malaysia)	2
Netherlands (Single Top 100)	3
Norway (VG-lista)	4
Singapore (Radio Singapore)	2
South Africa	2
Sweden (Sverigetopplistan)	12
UK Singles (OCC)	7
