= Don't Talk to Him =

1963 single by Cliff Richard and the Shadows

Single by Cliff Richard and The Shadows
- B-side: "Say You're Mine"
- Released: 1 November 1963
- Recorded: 13 October 1963
- Studio: EMI Studios, London
- Genre: Beat; pop rock
- Length: 2:53
- Label: Columbia
- Songwriters: Cliff Richard; Bruce Welch
- Producer: Norrie Paramor

Cliff Richard and The Shadows singles chronology
"It's All in the Game" (1963)	"Don't Talk to Him" (1963)	"Maria No Mas" (1963)

"Don't Talk to Him" is a song by Cliff Richard and The Shadows, released as a single in November 1963. It peaked at number 2 on the UK Singles Chart and received a silver disc for 250,000 sales.

== Background and release ==
The music for "Don't Talk to Him" was composed by Shadows guitarist Bruce Welch. He then asked Richard if he would write the lyrics. However, Richard has said that he was "sort of scared of writing", but agreed to "have a go". He recalled he "took it back to the cottage where I was staying. We were in Blackpool. And I sat down one night and played it through on my guitar and came up with the lyrics".

It was recorded at Abbey Road Studios, then known as EMI, whereas the B-side, "Say You're Mine", written by Tony Meehan and Norman Stracey, was recorded whilst the group was in Blackpool, at the Jubilee Hall. Both tracks were included on the EP Cliff Sings Don't Talk to Him, released in March 1964.

Richard also recorded a German-language version of "Don't Talk to Him", titled "Sag' "no" zu ihm", with German lyrics by Carl Ulrich Blecher and backing vocals by the Botho-Lucas-Quartett. It was released as a single in Germany in April 1964 as a double A-side with a German-language version of "I'm the Lonely One", titled "Zuviel allein". However, "Sag' "no" zu ihm" was more successful than the other side, becoming a top-ten hit in Germany and top-twenty hit in Austria.

== Reception ==
Reviewed in Record Mirror, "Don't Talk to Him" was described as a "beaty sort of catchy number with Cliff singing very well indeed on the cleverly arranged number which is slightly reminiscent of the oldie "It's Magic"". Another reviewer wrote that "in sharp contrast to It's All In The Game comes a haunting melody in slow cha-cha tempo", which is "ideal for dancing and makes easy-on-the-ear listening".

== Track listing ==
1. "Don't Talk to Him" – 2:53
2. "Say You're Mine" – 2:34

== Personnel ==
- Cliff Richard – lead and backing vocals
- Hank Marvin – lead guitar, backing vocals
- Bruce Welch – rhythm guitar, backing vocals
- Brian Locking – bass guitar
- Brian Bennett – drums

== Charts ==
Chart (1963–64)	Peak position
Australia (Kent Music Report)	3
Belgium (Ultratop 50 Flanders)	7
Belgium (Ultratop 50 Wallonia)	31
Canada (CHUM)	14
Denmark (Danmarks Radio)	3
Germany (GfK)	2
Ireland (IRMA)	1
Netherlands (Single Top 100)	5
New Zealand (Lever Hit Parade)	5
Norway (VG-lista)	1
Sweden (Sverigetopplistan)	9
UK Singles (OCC)	2

"Sag' "no" zu ihm"

Chart (1964)	Peak position
Austria (Podium)	12
Germany (GfK)	2
