= It'll Be Me (Jerry Lee Lewis song) =

Song written by Jack Clement

- Dutch release picture sleeve

Single by Jerry Lee Lewis
- A-side: "Whole Lot of Shakin' Going On"
- Released: April 15, 1957
- Recorded: February 1957
- Studio: Sun Studio, Memphis, Tennessee
- Genre: Rock and roll; rockabilly
- Length: 2:44
- Label: Sun
- Songwriter: Jack Clement
- Producers: Sam Phillips; Jack Clement

Jerry Lee Lewis singles chronology
"Crazy Arms" (1956)	"Whole Lot of Shakin' Going On" / "It'll Be Me" (1957)	"Great Balls of Fire" (1957)

"It'll Be Me" is a song written by Jack Clement, first released in April 1957 by Jerry Lee Lewis, as B-side to his single "Whole Lot of Shakin' Going On".

== Background and recording ==
Lewis had been performing "Whole Lot of Shakin' Going On" as part of his stage act and believed it was going to be a hit record. He wanted to recorded it and release it as his next single, but Sam Phillips, owner of Sun Records, did not believe it would be successful, seeing it as too vulgar and risqué. Instead, Phillips asked Jack Clement to write a new song with the intention that it be the follow up single to Lewis' first local hit, "Crazy Arms". The inspiration for the song, "It'll Be Me", came to Clement while he was going to the toilet. He was thinking a breakup with his girlfriend and also reincarnation and how it would be funny if he came back as a turd and how his girlfriend would looked down into the toilet bowl and he would be there. Hence, the original lyrics Clement came up with were "If you find a turd in your toilet bowl, it'll be me, and I'll be lookin' for you", with the first section later changed to "If you find a lump in your sugar bowl".

Lewis did not believe "It'll Be Me" would be a hit by itself and was insistent that he wanted to record "Whole Lot of Shakin' Going On". Phillips relented, agreeing that it could be the B-side to "It'll Be Me". Recording took place in February 1957. Five takes of "It'll Be Me" had been recorded and according to Clement, who was producing the record, "was in the control room and getting tired of it, so I went out there and said, 'Why don't we get off of this? We'll come back to it later, Jerry. Let's cut something else...'". Clement had put on enough tape to record one more take and band member J.M. Van Eaton suggested they play "Whole Lotta Shakin' Going On".

In the end, "Whole Lot of Shakin' Going On" was released as the A-side with "It'll Be Me" released as the B-side. Another slower and shorter version of the song, from a later recording session, was released in May 1958 on his first album Jerry Lee Lewis.

== Personnel ==
- Jerry Lee Lewis – vocals, piano
- Roland James – guitar
- J.M. Van Eaton – drums

== Cliff Richard and the Shadows version ==
"It'll Be Me"

Single by Cliff Richard and the Shadows

from the album 32 Minutes and 17 Seconds with Cliff Richard
- B-side: "Since I Lost You"
- Released: August 31, 1962
- Recorded: May 17, 1962
- Studio: EMI Studios, London
- Genre: Rock and roll
- Length: 1:55
- Label: Columbia
- Songwriter: Jack Clement
- Producer: Norrie Paramor

Cliff Richard and the Shadows singles chronology
"Lessons in Love" (1962)	"It'll Be Me" (1962)	"Wonderful to Be Young" (1962)

Cliff Richard and the Shadows released their version as a single in August 1962. It reached number two on the UK Record Retailer chart and was a top-ten hit in numerous other countries.

"It'll Be Me" was reported to have been released especially for the group's younger fans, with the rock and roll beat reminiscent of their early releases which initially found them fame. It was a direct contrast from their previous release in the UK, the ballad "I'm Lookin' out the Window", with Richard saying that "no artist can afford to concentrate for too long on one style". Nevertheless, the B-side, "Since I Lost You", written by the Shadows' Bruce Welch and Hank Marvin, is a sentimental ballad, with one reviewer for the Worcester Evening News writing that "this will be more popular than the top side with his fans who flocked out to buy "I'm Looking Out The Window"."

=== Charts ===
Chart (1962–63)	Peak position
Australia (Kent Music Report)	6
Belgium (Ultratop 50 Flanders)	8
Belgium (Ultratop 50 Wallonia)	28
Canada (CHUM)	14
Denmark (Quan Musikbureau)	2
Ireland (Evening Herald)	2
Israel (Kol Israel Broadcasting)	2
Hong Kong	8
Netherlands (Single Top 100)	2
Norway (VG-lista)	2
South Africa (SARMDA)	3
Sweden (Sverigetopplistan)	5
UK Disc Top 20	2
UK Melody Maker Top 50	2
UK New Musical Express Top 30	2
UK Record Retailer Top 50	2
