= Move It =

1958 single by Cliff Richard and the Drifters

Single by Cliff Richard and the Drifters
- B-side: "Schoolboy Crush"
- Released: 29 August 1958
- Recorded: 24 July 1958
- Studio: EMI, London
- Genre: Rock and roll
- Length: 2:23
- Label: Columbia
- Songwriter: Ian Samwell
- Producer: Norrie Paramor

Cliff Richard and the Drifters singles chronology
"Move It" (1958)	"High Class Baby" (1958)

Alternative cover
- Cover of 1982 reissue

"Move It" is a song written by Ian Samwell and recorded by Cliff Richard and the Drifters (the English band that would later become the Shadows). Originally intended as the B-side to "Schoolboy Crush", it was released as Richard's debut single on 29 August 1958 and became his first hit record, reaching the top five in the UK. It is often described as Britain's first authentic rock and roll song, and credited with being one of the first authentic rock and roll songs produced outside the United States.

== Background and recording ==
Recording director of Columbia, Norrie Paramor had been given a demo tape of Cliff Richard and the Drifters by their agent George Ganjou and decided to give them an audition at EMI Studios, which they passed. A recording session at EMI was then booked for 24 July to record a song Paramor thought would suit them, "Schoolboy Crush", written by Aaron Schroeder and Sharon Gilbert, which had originally been recorded by American singer Bobby Helms. The issue was that they needed another song as the flipside for a single. However, this was solved when Drifters guitarist Ian Samwell wrote "Move It" a week before the session.

The song was written whilst Samwell was on a Green Line bus from London Colney to where Richard lived in Cheshunt for a rehearsal. It was his first attempt at writing a song and was a riposte to an article by Steve Race published in Melody Maker which stated: "So rock’n’roll is dead, is it? My funeral oration consists of just two words: good riddance". Sitting on an empty top deck of the bus, Samwell began playing on his guitar trying to figure out Chuck Berry's licks, and stumbled upon a riff that would become the intro to "Move It". After playing this, he began quickly writing down lyrics on a packet of guitar strings. Upon arriving at Richard's house, he rewrote the lyrics so that Richard could read them and then played it to the band. The band liked the song and their manager Johnny Foster suggested the title "Move It".

For the recording session, Paramor hired two session musicians, bassist Frank Clarke and guitarist Ernie Shear, as he was not sure the Drifters would be able to provide the necessary backing. The Mike Sammes Singers were also hired to provide backing vocals on "Schoolboy Crush".

== Release ==
Franklyn Boyd, the publisher for "Schoolboy Crush", wanted to promote the song and with a white label record of the single, asked BBC television producer Dennis Main Wilson if Richard would be able to appear on the programme Six-Five Special. However, after being told he wouldn't be able to appear for six weeks, Boyd asked Jack Good at ITV who had had success with two pilot episodes for his rival programme Oh Boy!. Good listened to "Schoolboy Crush" and "Move It" and loved the latter, deciding to use Richard on the show. The only catch was Richard could only appear if he sang "Move It" and not "Schoolboy Crush", despite the fact that by this point all the promotion had gone into "Schoolboy Crush". Not wanting this opportunity to be missed, on 13 September, Richard appeared on the first episode of Oh Boy! singing "Move It".

"Schoolboy Crush" was released backed with "Move It" on 29 August 1958. Following the success of Richard on Oh Boy!, the record label changed the promotion to "Move It" and it entered the charts in the UK by the end of the following week, peaking at number 2 on the New Musical Express chart. "Move It" was released in the US in November 1958, backed with Richard's subsequent UK single "High Class Baby", but failed to find much success, selling just over 1100 copies.

On the original recording of "Move It", Richard sang the first verse twice as Samwell did not complete the lyrics for a second verse. However, Samwell finally finished the second verse in 1995 and sent it to Hank Marvin who included "Move It" on his album Hank Plays Cliff, with Richard having recorded a new vocal track which included the new verse. The new version was debuted live at a Royal Variety Performance in front of Queen Elizabeth II that year. Since then, Richard has continued to perform the song with the additional verse.

== Influence ==
The Beatles, in an outtake on The Get Back Journals, were recorded playing "Move It" in medley with "Good Rockin' Tonight". John Lennon was separately quoted as saying, "I think the first English record that was anywhere near anything was 'Move It' by Cliff Richard, and before that there'd been nothing."

Led Zeppelin included Richard's original version of the song on a 2010 compilation put together by them, titled Led Zeppelin: The Music that Rocked Us.

== Personnel ==
Cliff Richard and the Drifters

- Cliff Richard – vocals
- Ian Samwell – rhythm guitar
- Terry Smart – drums

Session musicians

- Ernie Shear – lead guitar
- Frank Clarke – double bass
- Mike Sammes Singers – backing vocals on "Schoolboy Crush"

== Charts ==
Chart (1958–59)	Peak position
Australia (Kent Music Report)	100
Norway (VG-lista)	5
UK Disc Top 20	2
UK Melody Maker Top 20	3
UK New Musical Express Top 30	2
UK Record Mirror Top 20	3

== 2006 version ==
"Move It"
- Cover of 7" vinyl edition of single

Single by Cliff Richard featuring Brian May and Brian Bennett

from the album Two's Company: The Duets
- A-side: "21st Century Christmas"
- Released: 11 December 2006
- Recorded: 27 June 2006
- Studio: Abbey Road Studio 2, London
- Genre: Rock and roll
- Length: 4:07
- Label: EMI
- Songwriter: Ian Samwell
- Producers: May; Bennett

Cliff Richard featuring Brian May and Brian Bennett singles chronology
"Yesterday Once More" (2006)	"21st Century Christmas" / "Move It" (2006)	"When I Need You" (2007)

In 2006, Richard re-recorded "Move It" with Brian May of Queen on guitar and Brian Bennett of the Shadows on drums. He recorded it as part of a campaign to extend the copyright on recordings from 50 years to 70 years, with Richard's original recording of "Move It" set to enter the public domain at the end of 2008. The British government turned down this request in 2007 and so a number of Richard's songs entered the public domain over the next few years. However, the copyright law was eventually changed in 2013, though this was not retroactive, so songs recorded before 1963 remained in the public domain.

"Move It" was released as the second track on a double A-side CD single alongside "21st Century Christmas". The single peaked on debut at number 2 on the UK Singles Chart in December. A limited edition 7" vinyl single was also released with "Move It" as the A-side. The track was included on Richard's 2006 duets album Two's Company: The Duets.

=== Personnel ===
- Cliff Richard – vocals
- Brian May – guitar
- Brian Bennett – drums
- Mo Foster – bass
- Sara Bricusse – other instruments

== Other re-recordings ==
Richard has re-recorded the song numerous times, both in the studio and during stage performances. The re-recordings appear on the following albums:

Studio albums

- Don't Stop Me Now! (1967)
- Rock 'n' Roll Silver (25th anniversary album, 1983)
- Hank plays Cliff (Hank Marvin album with Richard as guest vocals, 1995)
- Two's Company (2006)
- Reunited – Cliff Richard and The Shadows (50th anniversary album, 2009)
- Just... Fabulous Rock 'n' Roll (2016)

Live albums

- Cliff (debut album, 1959)
- Thank You Very Much (1979)
- From a Distance: The Event (1990)
- Party at the Palace (various artists album, 2002) Richard performed with S Club 7 and Brian May (on lead guitar) for the Golden Jubilee of Elizabeth II, 2002.
- The World Tour (2004)

Live recordings on singles

- Human Work of Art (1993, CD1) – Acoustic version recorded live at Wembley Arena, 1992
- The Miracle (1999, CD2) – Recorded live at the Royal Albert Hall, 1999
