= I Love You (Cliff Richard song) =

Single by Cliff Richard and The Shadows
- B-side: "'D' In Love" (Tepper-Bennett)
- Released: 25 November 1960
- Recorded: 9 September 1960
- Studio: EMI Studios, London
- Genre: Pop
- Length: 2:02
- Label: Columbia 45-DB4547
- Songwriter: Bruce Welch
- Producer: Norrie Paramor

Cliff Richard and The Shadows singles chronology
"Nine Times Out of Ten" (1960)	"I Love You" (1960)	"Catch Me" (1961)

"I Love You" is the fourth UK number-one hit single (and the second of the 1960s) by Cliff Richard and the Shadows. It was written by the Shadows' rhythm guitarist Bruce Welch.

Released in November 1960, it was a Christmas No. 1 and stayed at the chart summit for two weeks, although unlike Richard's later Christmas No. 1 singles ("Mistletoe and Wine" and "Saviour's Day"), it did not carry a traditional holiday theme. The song also reached No. 1 in New Zealand. and also India (The Voice, Calcutta).

It took until 1977 before another song entitled "I Love You" entered the UK Singles Chart. It was recorded by Donna Summer.

== Track listing ==
1. "I Love You" – 2:02
2. "'D' in Love" – 2:29

== Personnel ==
- Cliff Richard – vocals
- Hank Marvin – lead guitar
- Bruce Welch – rhythm guitar
- Jet Harris – bass guitar
- Tony Meehan – drums

== Charts ==
Chart (1960–61)	Peak position
Australia (Kent Music Report)	78
Belgium (Ultratop 50 Flanders)	14
Belgium (Ultratop 50 Wallonia)	49
Germany (GfK)	34
India (The Voice, Calcutta)	1
Ireland (Evening Herald)	4
Netherlands (Single Top 100)	6
New Zealand (Lever Hit Parade)	1
Norway (VG-lista)	6
Sweden (Sverigetopplistan)	20
UK Singles (OCC)	1
