= L'edera (song) =

Italian song

Single by Nilla Pizzi
- B-side: "Nel blu, dipinto di blu"
- Released: January 1958
- Length: 3:39
- Composer: Saverio Seracini
- Lyricist: Vincenzo D'Acquisto

"L'edera" (Italian pronunciation: [ˈleːdera]; "The Ivy") is an Italian language song, written by Saverio Seracini and Vincenzo D'Acquisto. The song premiered at the 8th Sanremo Music Festival in January 1958, being performed first by Nilla Pizzi and then Tonina Torrielli, with separate performances, and placing second in the competition, behind "Nel blu, dipinto di blu" by Domenico Modugno and Johnny Dorelli. "L'edera" was later recorded by several Italian artists, including Claudio Villa.

== "Constantly (L'Edera)" ==
"Constantly (L'Edera)"

Single by Cliff Richard
- Released: 24 April 1964
- Recorded: 17 November 1963
- Studio: Abbey Road Studios
- Length: 2:40
- Label: Columbia
- Composer: Saverio Seracini
- Lyricist: Michael Julien
- Producer: Norrie Paramor

Cliff Richard singles chronology
"I'm the Lonely One" (1964)	"Constantly (L'Edera)" (1964)	"On the Beach" (1964)

Music video
- "Constantly" on YouTube

In 1963, the song was recorded as "Constantly (L'Edera)" by Cliff Richard with English lyrics by Michael Julien, arranged and conducted by Norrie Paramor. It was released as a non-album single in 1964.

The British single reached No. 4 in the UK Singles Chart and was an international hit charting in Australia (No. 6), Ireland (No. 8), New Zealand (No. 3), Norway (No. 4) and Sweden (No. 10).

=== "True True Lovin'" ===
In some markets, "Constantly" appeared as a B-side to another Cliff Richard single "True True Lovin'". In Hong Kong, this configuration reached at least number 6.

=== Chart performance ===
Chart (1964)	Peak position
UK Singles (Official Charts)	4
Australia (Kent Music Report)	6
Australia (Music Maker, Sydney)	3
Belgium (Ultratop 50 Flanders)	9
Denmark (Tracklisten)	4
Finland (IFPI Finland)	19
Holland (Platennieuws)	1
Ireland (IRMA)	8
Malaysia (Radio Malaysia)	1
Netherlands (Single Top 100)	3
Norway (VG-lista)	4
Philippines	7
South Africa	1
Spain (Promusicae)	8
Sweden (Sverigetopplistan)	10

== See also ==
- Cliff Richard discography
