= Please Don't Tease =

Single by Cliff Richard and the Shadows
- B-side: "Where Is My Heart"
- Released: 24 June 1960
- Recorded: 25 March 1960
- Studio: EMI Studios, London
- Genre: Pop
- Length: 2:59
- Label: Columbia 45-DB4479
- Songwriters: Bruce Welch; Pete Chester
- Producer: Norrie Paramor

Cliff Richard and the Shadows singles chronology
"Fall in Love with You" (1960)	"Please Don't Tease" (1960)	"Nine Times Out of Ten" (1960)

"Please Don't Tease" is a 1960 song recorded by Cliff Richard and the Shadows. Recorded in March and released as a single in June, the song became their third No. 1 on the UK Singles Chart spending three weeks at the summit. The song was written by the Shadows' rhythm guitarist Bruce Welch together with Pete Chester.

== Release ==
To decide upon the release of this track as a single, Richard's record company recruited a teenage panel to listen to and vote on a selection of his unreleased tracks. "Please Don't Tease" won the vote and was duly released, "Nine Times Out of Ten" came second and was the follow-up single.

The single also reached number 1 in India, Ireland, New Zealand, Norway and Thailand. The single sold 1.59 million copies worldwide.

"Please Don't Tease" was included on the EP Cliff's Silver Discs, released December 1960. Its first inclusion on an LP was Cliff's Hit Album, released in July 1963.

In 1978, the song was revisited in a contemporary arrangement and added to his live repertoire. It was played without the Shadows at their reunion concerts in March 1978 (as recorded on Thank You Very Much), and recorded in the studio and released as the B-side of "Please Remember Me" in July 1978.

== Track listing ==
1. "Please Don't Tease" – 2:59
2. "Where Is My Heart" – 2:12

== Personnel ==
- Cliff Richard – vocals
- Hank Marvin – lead guitar
- Bruce Welch – rhythm guitar
- Jet Harris – bass guitar
- Tony Meehan – drums

== Chart performance ==
Chart (1960)	Peak position
Australia (Kent Music Report)	2
France (SNEP)	22
India (The Voice, Culcutta)	1
Ireland (IRMA)	1
Netherlands (Single Top 100)	8
New Zealand (Lever Hit Parade)	1
Norway (VG-lista)	1
Sweden (Sverigetopplistan)	6
UK Singles (Official Charts)	1
