= Brian Bennett =

British musician (born 1940)

Brian Bennett OBE
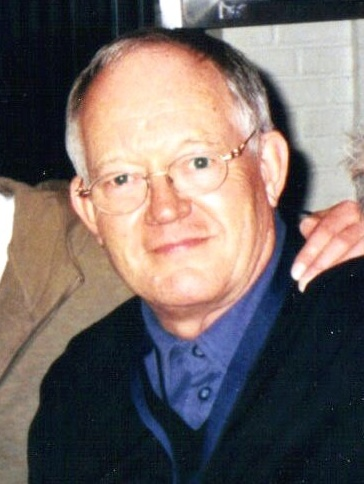
- Bennett in 2005

Background information
- Also known as: James Aldenham
- Born: Brian Laurence Bennett; 9 February 1940 (age 86)
- Origin: Palmers Green, North London, England, UK
- Genre: Rock and roll
- Occupations: Musician, composer
- Instruments: Drums, piano
- Years active: 1956–present
- Website: www.brianbennettmusic.co.uk

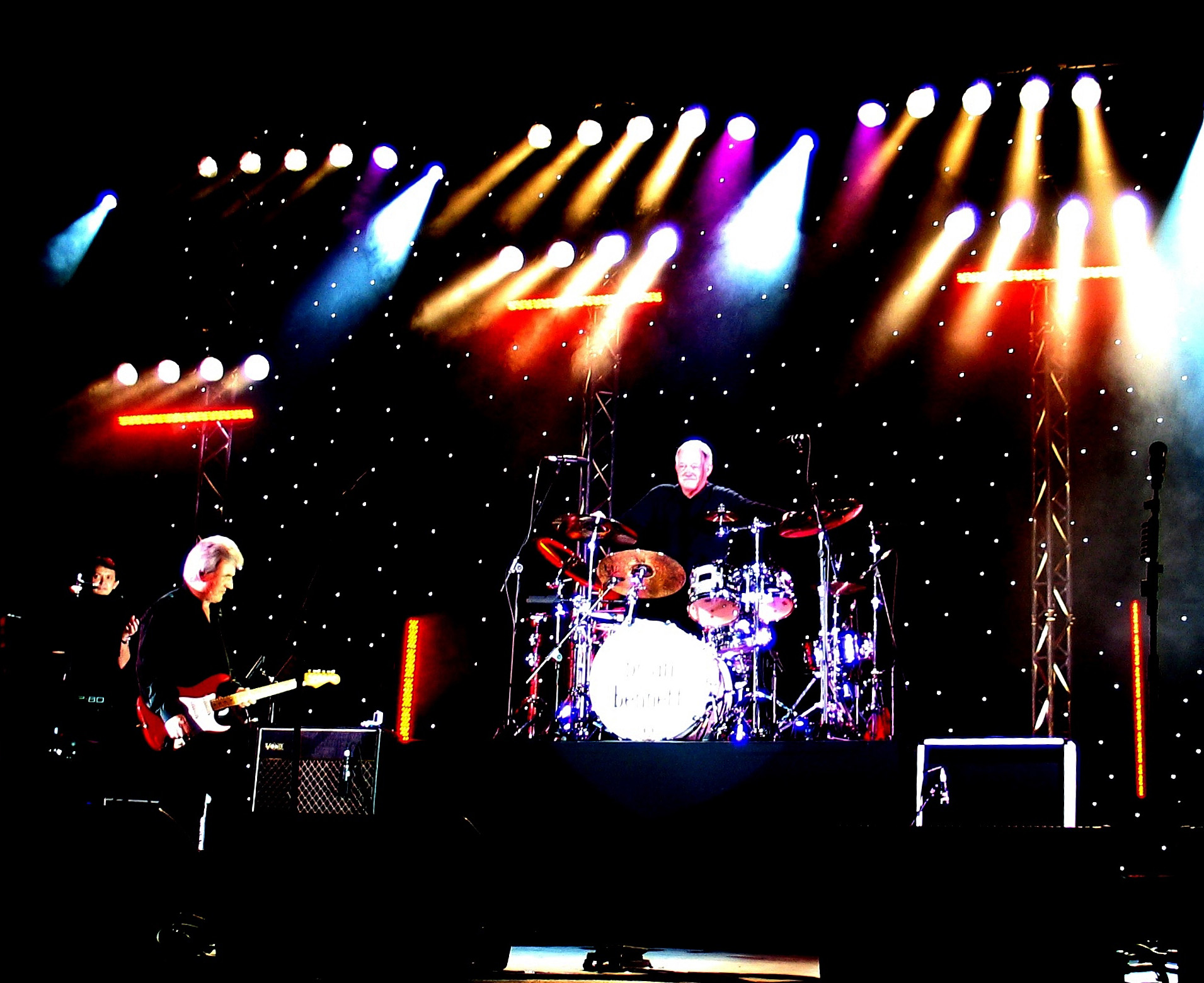
Brian Bennett, Bruce Welch and Warren Bennett at a concert in Brussels in 2005

Brian Laurence Bennett (born 9 February 1940) is an English drummer, pianist, composer and producer of popular music. He is best known as the drummer of the UK rock and roll group the Shadows. He is the father of musician and Shadows band member Warren Bennett.

== Early life ==
Bennett was born in Palmers Green, North London, England and was educated at Hazelwood School and Winchmore School.

== Career ==
=== Early career ===
Bennett studied drums with Max Abrams after returning to London and became the in-house drummer at The 2i's Coffee Bar in Soho and was a regular performer on Jack Good's TV show Oh Boy!

He then became a member of Marty Wilde's Wildcats in 1959. After a successful period with the Wildcats, during which he appeared on their instrumental record without Wilde (recorded as the Krew Kats), "Trambone", he backed Tommy Steele for some of his London stage performances.

=== The Shadows ===
In October 1961 he joined Cliff Richard and the Shadows as the replacement for Tony Meehan. The Shadows were known for their instrumental songs, mainly; "Apache" (1960), "F.B.I." (1961), "Wonderful Land" (1962), and "Foot Tapper" (1963), among many others.

Bennett is best known for co-writing "Summer Holiday" with rhythm guitarist Bruce Welch. The band split up between 1968 and 1973, but was reformed by Marvin, Welch and Bennett. In addition to his work with the Shadows he has also appeared in Cliff Richard's backing band and plays piano and occasionally vibraphone.

The band reunited from 2008 to 2010, and played one-off concerts in 2015 and 2020. Bennett along with Hank Marvin and Bruce Welch was one of three core members of the group

=== Other works ===
In 1967, Bennett released a solo album of jazz music, entitled Change of Direction, in mono and stereo (neither charted). This was the first solo album by a member of the Shadows. Also in the 1960s and 1970s, Bennett played the drums on records by other artists including Labi Siffre, Ella Fitzgerald, Olivia Newton-John, The Walker Brothers and Peter Frampton.

Bennett has enjoyed a parallel and successful career as a composer of library music, issuing multiple LPs with production music labels such as Bruton and KPM. He was also a member of Steve Gray's WASP ensemble, which recorded library music for the KPM 1000 Series. This has resulted in the use of his music for many popular TV theme tunes including BBC sports themes such as Rugby Special ("Holy Mackerel") and BBC Golf ("Chase Side Shoot Up"), Channel 9 Australia's cricket theme and police drama Bluey theme tune ("New Horizons"), the sitcoms Robin's Nest and Birds of a Feather, The Ruth Rendell Mysteries, Pulaski, Square Deal, Close to Home, Murder in Mind and, with his son Warren, composed and played the incidental music in New Tricks.

Bennett made several unsuccessful attempts to write the UK entry to the Eurovision Song Contest and twice performed in the competition. In 1970, he provided backing vocals for Mary Hopkin when she placed 2nd in the contest and five years later, when The Shadows represented the UK in 1975, he placed 2nd again with his band. His compositions in the UK Eurovision heats placed 2nd in 1971, 4th in 1973 and 3rd in 1975 when he wrote a song for The Shadows.

In the 1970s, music by Bennett was selected for several Radley Metzger films, including Barbara Broadcast and The Opening of Misty Beethoven. Two of his most famous works were "The Journey" and "Just a Minute" written under the alias James Aldenham and used for the ITV Schools on 4 broadcasts between 1987 and 1993. He scored the British-German film The Harpist in 1999. He is also an orchestral conductor, having learned how to arrange and conduct music for orchestras from a correspondence course.

Bennett's compositions had a resurgence when used by hip hop rappers in the 2010s, including Kanye West and Nas. In 2017, Bennett and Welch unveiled a blue plaque at the Globe theatre in Stockton. In 2021, he along with many other drummers, were enlisted by Don Powell of Slade to record the charity single "Let There Be Drums". In 2022, he released a single "Name of the Game" with Dave Richmond, which was on the UK Physical Singles Chart for one week in December 2022, at number 82.

== Personal life ==
Bennett's son, Warren, formerly played keyboards for the band Glass Ties, and is also a composer and producer. Brian is a widower. In the early 1960s, Bennett did a postal course with Berklee College of Music in composing.

In May 2005, Bennett took part in the Shadows' European tour. During a show in Reykjavík, Iceland he sustained what was thought to be a minor injury to a finger. A splinter from a drumstick pierced under his fingernail on his right hand, he removed it with a pair of old pliers and applied a plaster. He eventually called a doctor while in France and had a quick operation to heal his wounded finger. Bennett managed to play for the rest of the tour using an altered playing style.

== Honours ==
He was appointed OBE (Officer of the Order of the British Empire) in the 2004 Queen's Birthday Honours List for services to music.

Bennett runs a home recording studio, Honeyhill studios, in Radlett, Hertfordshire. In March 2010, at the age of 70, Bennett completed a 50th Anniversary reunion world tour with Cliff Richard and the Shadows.

== Discography ==
=== Albums ===
Year	Label	Title	Notes
1967	Columbia	Change of Direction	
1969	Columbia	Illustrated London Noise	
1974	KPM	Synthesis	Collaboration with Alan Hawkshaw
1978	DJM	Voyage (A Journey Into Faded Dark)	
1978	DJM	Voyage (A Journey Into Discoid Funk)	
1978	Bruton	Tone Poems	
The World Around Us	Bruton		
1982	Bruton	Nature Watch	
1985	Bruton	In The Groove	Collaboration with Warren Bennett
1990	Bruton	Air Scapes	
1994	BELART	Nomads Of The Wind	

=== Singles ===
Year	Month	Label	A-side	B-side	Notes	UK
1967	3 November	Columbia	"Canvas"	"Slippery Jim De Grize"	DB 8294	
1974	19 July	Fontana	"Chase Side Shoot-Up"	"Pegasus"	6007040	
1976	1 September	DJM	"Thunderbolt"	"Clearing Skies"	DJS10714 / Released as "The Brian Bennett Band"	
1977	18 March	DJM	"Saturday Night Special"	"Farewell To A Friend"	DJS10756 / Released as "The Brian Bennett Band"	
1977	24 June	DJM	"The Girls Back Home"	"Jonty Jump"	DJS10791 / Released as "The Brian Bennett Band"	
1978	31 March	DJM	"Pendulum Force"	"Ocean Glide"	DJS10843	
1982	22 January	DJM	"Top Of The World"	"Soul Ice"	DJM10981	
2006	11 December	EMI	"Move It"	"21st Century Christmas"	Single by Cliff Richard / Bennett is a featured artist alongside Brian May	2
2022	25 November	Measured Mile	"Name of the Game"	"Confunktion"	Collaboration with Dave Richmond	82 (Physical Singles Chart)

== Production credits ==
=== Films ===
Year	Title	Songs
1986	Luxo Jr.	"Chateau Latour", "Finesse", "Quicksilver"
2007	Light & Heavy	"Chateau Latour"
2007	Surprise	"Quicksilver"

=== Music ===
Year	Artist	Album	Single	Notes
1976	Dennis Waterman	Downwind of Angels		
1977	Dennis Waterman	Dennis Waterman		
1977	Demis Roussos	The Demis Roussos Magic		
2016	Drake		"Summer Sixteen"	Bennett's recording of "Glass Tubes" is sampled in the song, and so he is credited as a songwriter
