= Bruce Welch =

English musician (born 1941)

Bruce Welch OBE
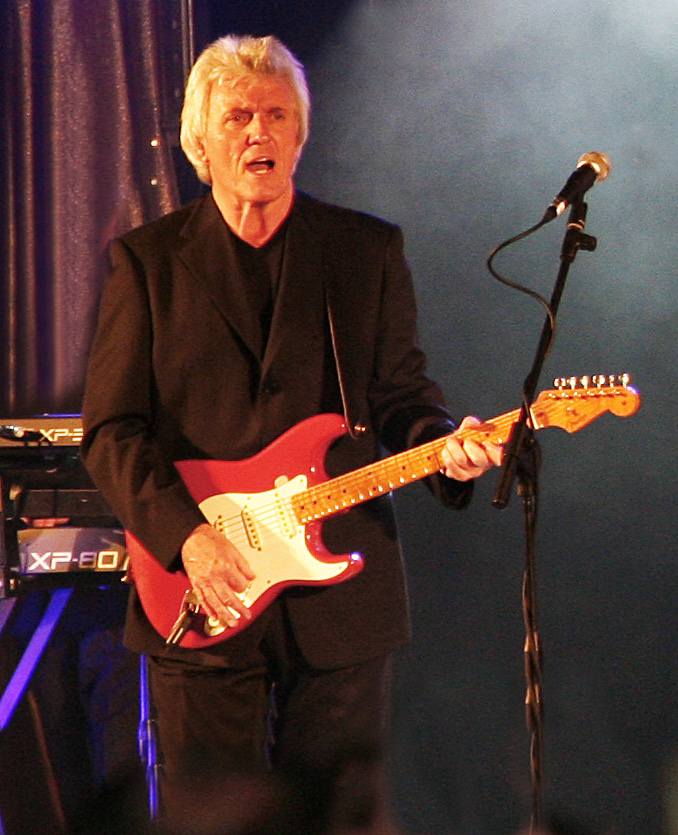
- Welch performing in September 2007

Background information
- Born: Bruce Cripps; 2 November 1941 (age 84); Bognor Regis, Sussex, England
- Origin: Newcastle upon Tyne, Tyne & Wear, England
- Genres: Instrumental rock
- Occupations: Musician; producer; songwriter; music publishing company owner
- Instruments: Guitar, vocals
- Years active: 1958–present
- Formerly of: The Shadows; Marvin, Welch & Farrar
- Website: www.brucewelchtribute.com

Bruce Welch (born Bruce Cripps; 2 November 1941) is an English guitarist, songwriter, producer, singer and businessman best known as a founding member of the Shadows.

== Early life ==
Bruce Welch was born in Bognor Regis in 1941. His parents (Stan Cripps and Grace Welch) moved him to 15 Broadwood View, Chester-le-Street, County Durham shortly after. Welch's mother died when he was aged six, and he grew up with his Aunt Sadie.

== The Shadows ==
After learning to play the guitar, he formed a Tyneside skiffle band called the Railroaders when he was fourteen. His Rutherford Grammar School friend Brian Rankin (later to be known as Hank Marvin) joined the group, and they travelled to London in 1958 for the final of a talent competition. Although they did not win, they joined with members of other entrant bands and formed the Five Chesternuts with Pete Chester (born 1942), son of comedian Charlie Chester, on drums.

Upon moving to London, Bruce Welch and Hank Marvin briefly operated as the Geordie Boys before enlisting in an outfit called the Drifters. In September 1958, Welch and Marvin joined the Drifters, later to become the Shadows, as Cliff Richard's backing band. As well as success with the Shadows, Welch acted as producer for (among others) Richard and songwriter for his ex-fiancée, Olivia Newton-John. He also released a solo single, "Please Mr. Please", which was not commercially successful, though the song has been recorded by several other recording artists (most notably Newton-John, who would take it into the top 10 of the US pop and country charts in 1975).

Welch wrote several number 1 hit singles for Richard and for the Shadows. Among tunes or songs written or co-written by Welch are the Shadows' hits "Foot Tapper", "Theme for Young Lovers", and "The Rise and Fall of Flingel Bunt", Marvin Welch & Farrar's "Faithful" and "My Home Town", and Cliff Richard hits "Please Don't Tease", "In the Country", "Summer Holiday", "I Love You" and "I Could Easily Fall (In Love with You)".

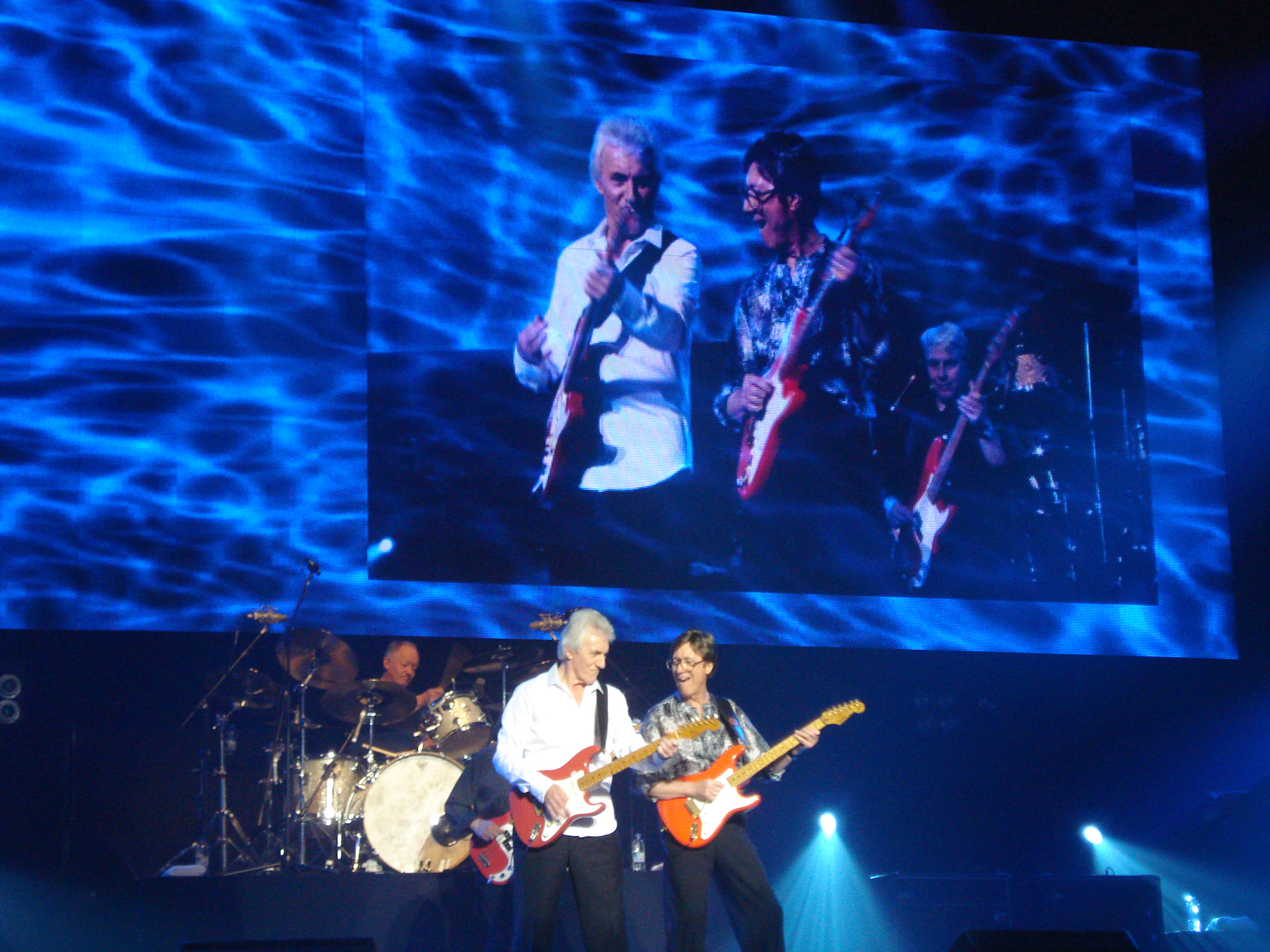
Welch with Hank Marvin during The Shadows 50th Anniversary Tour in 2009

He was the musical consultant for the West End musical Buddy – The Buddy Holly Story.

After the Shadows disbanded in 1990, with Marvin deciding to tour with his own band, Welch's plans for his own tours did not fully materialise until 1998, when he formed Bruce Welch's Shadows (originally called 'Bruce Welch's Moonlight Shadows' – a name that was dropped after 1998). The group featured former Shadows bassist Alan Jones and keyboardist Cliff Hall, with Bob Watkins on drums. Phil Kelly and Barry Gibson (owner of Burns Guitars) shared lead guitar duties until Gibson's departure in 2000. Daniel Martin and Justin Daish replaced Kelly for the 2012 Shadowmania.

== Shadowmania ==
In 1998, he produced Shadowmania, a one-day show comprising various Shadows tribute bands, with his own band topping the bill. Owing to the event's success, he presented it annually until 2012, missing only 2004 and 2009 due to tours with the reformed Shadows.

At Shadowmania 2011 he included a 'Tribute to Jet Harris', his former band member who had died from cancer in March of that year. At Shadowmania 2012, Phil Kelly could not appear because of illness and was replaced by session guitarist-songwriter Daniel Martin.

== Honours ==
Welch was appointed OBE (Officer of the Order of the British Empire) in the 2004 Birthday Honours list for services to music.

== Personal life ==
Welch lives in Richmond, south west London. Bruce married Jilly Hamilton on 12 September 2024 in a private family service in Richmond.

== Early career groups (before Shadows and Drifters) ==
1956–57 – The Railroaders (No. 1)

- Hank Marvin (guitar), Bruce Welch (guitar), George Williams (guitar) and Jim ? (drums)

1956–57 – The Railroaders (No. 2)

- Hank Marvin (guitar), Bruce Welch (guitar), Eddie Silver (guitar), George Williams (bass) and Jim ? (drums)

1958 – The Five Chesternuts

- 7-inch single – "Jean Dorothy"/"Teenage Love" – on Columbia
- Gerry Hurst (vocals), Hank Marvin (guitar), Bruce Welch (guitar), Neil Johnson (bass) and Pete Chester (drums)

== Groups ==
- The Railroaders
- The Five Chesternuts
- The Drifters
- Cliff Richard and the Drifters
- The Shadows
- Cliff Richard and the Shadows
- Marvin, Welch & Farrar
- Bruce Welch's Shadows

== Discography ==
- "Please Mr Please"/"Song of Yesterday" – EMI 2141 – 7-inch – 1974.
- Marvin Welch and Farrar – Marvin Welch and Farrar – Regal Zonophone – 1971.
- Marvin Welch and Farrar – Second Opinion – Regal Zonophone 1971.
- The Five Chesternuts – "Jean Dorothy" – Columbia – 7-inch – 1958.
- The Shadows – The Shadows discography

== Guest vocals ==
- Marvin and Farrar – Hank Marvin and John Farrar – EMI – LP/CD – 1973.

== Production credits ==
- Cliff Richard – "We Don't Talk Anymore" – 7-inch and 12-inch (extended mix) – EMI – 1979.
- Cliff Richard – I'm Nearly Famous – LP/CD – EMI – 1975.
- Cliff Richard – Every Face Tells a Story – LP/CD – EMI – 1976.
- Cliff Richard – Green Light – LP/CD – EMI – 1978.
- Cliff Richard – "Little Mistreater" on album The Album – LP/CD – EMI – 1992.
- The Shadows – XXV – LP/CD – Polydor – 1983.
- Tarney / Spencer Band – "Cathy's Clown" – 7-inch – A&M – 1979.
- Roger Whittaker – The Genius of Love – LP/CD – 1986.
- Olivia Newton-John – If Not For You – LP/CD – Pye – 1971.
- Olivia Newton-John – Olivia – LP/CD – Pye – 1972.
- Charlie Dore – Where to Now – LP/CD – Island/Lemon – 1979.
- Cilla Black – Especially for You – LP/CD – Ktel/Hallmark – 1980.
- Alan David – Alan David – LP – EMI/EMC3365 – 1981.
- Alan Davy – [unreleased album] – 1981.
- Sutherland Brothers and Quiver – Down to Earth – LP/CD – CBS/Lemon – 1977/.
- Page Three – "Hold on to Love" – 7-inch – WB.
- McArthur Park – "Taffeta Rose" / "Sammy" – Columbia – 7-inch.

== Bibliography ==
Books

- J. Harris, R. Ellis and C. Richard, Driftin' with Cliff Richard (London, 1959).
- The Shadows by Themselves by Royston Ellis with the Shadows. Consul Books. 1961. No ISBN
- Mike Read (1983). The Story of the Shadows: An Autobiography. Hamish Hamilton. ISBN 978-0-241-10861-1.
- Bruce L. Welch; Howard Elson (1989). Rock and Roll: I Gave You the Best Years of My Life. Viking. ISBN 978-0-670-82705-3.
- "That Sound" (From Move It On: The Story of the Magic Sound of the Shadows), by R. Pistolesi, M. Addey & M. Mazzini. Publ: Vanni Lisanti. June 2000. No ISBN
- A Pocket Guide to Shadow Music, by M. Campbell, R. Bradford, L. Woosey. Idmon. ISBN 0-9535567-4-3
- Les Woosey Malcolm Campbell (2005). Guide to the Shadows and Hank Marvin on CD. ISBN 978-0-9535567-3-1.
- The Shadows at Polydor, by M.Campbell. Idmon. ISBN 0-9535567-2-7
- Malcolm Campbell (1 January 2001). The Shadows at EMI: The Vinyl Legacy. Idmon Publ. ISBN 978-0-9535567-1-7.
- Pete Frame (1998). More Rock Family Trees. Omnibus Press. ISBN 978-0-7119-6879-0.
- 17 Watts: First 20 Years of British Rock Guitar, the Musicians and Their Stories, by Mo Foster, Sanctuary Music Library, ISBN 9781860742675
- The Shadows Discography, by John Friesen. No ISBN
- The Shadows Discography, by George Geddes. No ISBN
- David Roberts (June 2006). British Hit Singles & Albums. Guinness World Records. ISBN 978-1-904994-10-7.
- Neil Warwick; Jon Kutner; Tony Brown (30 November 2004). The Complete Book of the British Charts: Singles and Albums. Omnibus Press. ISBN 978-1-84449-058-5.
- John Farrar—Music Makes my Day, (A Shadsfax-Tribute-40pp-booklet), by T. Hoffman, A. Hardwick, S. Duffy, G. Jermy, A. Lewis, J. Auman. No ISBN
- John Rostill—Funny Old World, (Tribute-60pp-booklet), by B. Bradford. No ISBN
