= Hank Marvin =

English musician (born 1941)

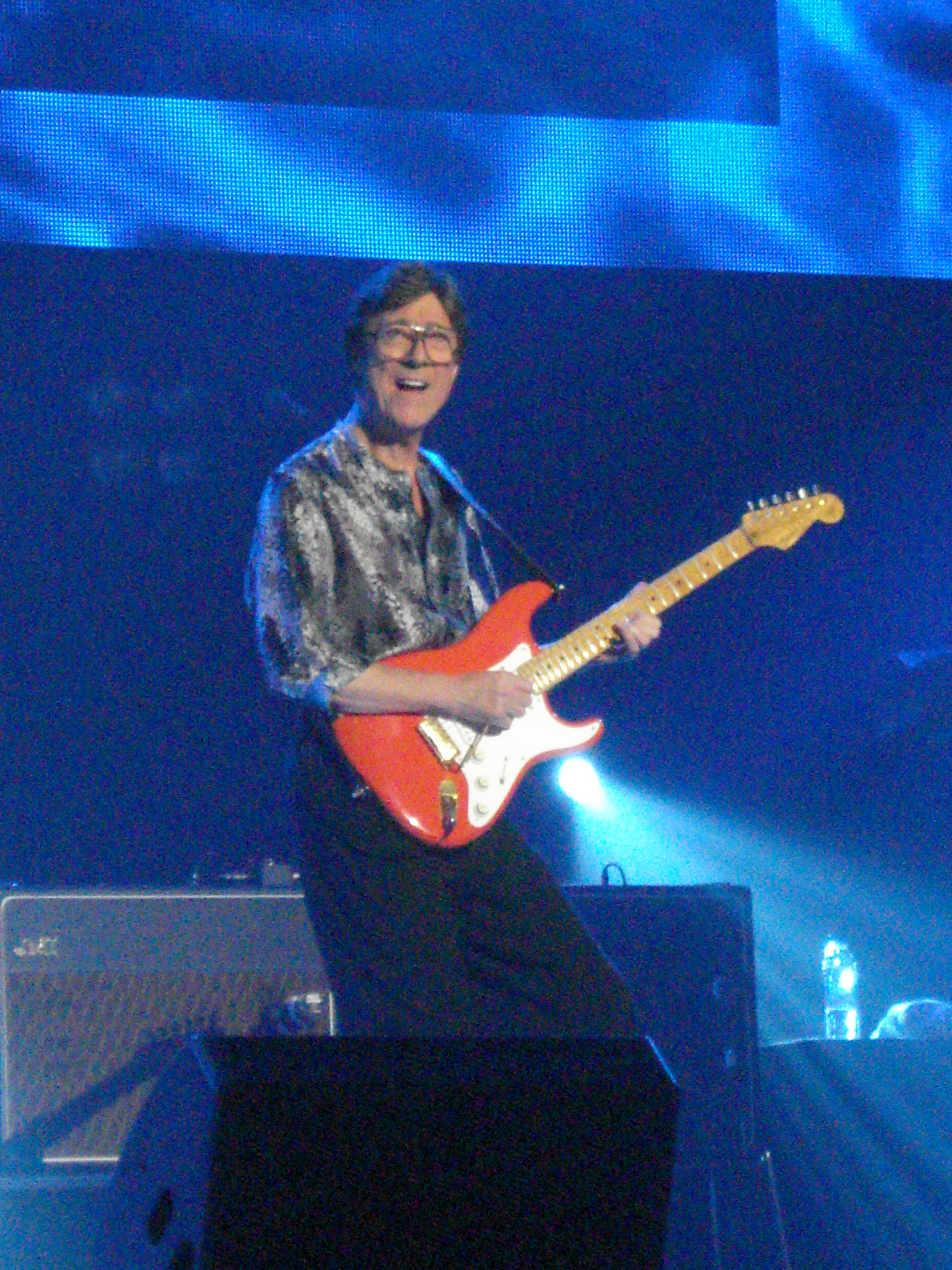
- Marvin in 2009

Background information
- Born: Brian Robson Rankin; 28 October 1941 (age 85); Newcastle upon Tyne, England
- Genres: Beat; instrumental rock; rock and roll
- Occupations: Musician; vocalist; songwriter
- Instruments: Guitar; banjo; vocals; piano
- Years active: 1958–present
- Formerly of: The Shadows; Marvin, Welch & Farrar

Hank Brian Marvin (born Brian Robson Rankin; 28 October 1941) is a British and Australian musician and songwriter. He is known as the lead guitarist for the Shadows.

== Early life and career ==
Marvin was born as Brian Robson Rankin at 138 Stanhope Street in Newcastle upon Tyne, England. His father was an army officer. He played banjo and piano. After hearing Buddy Holly he decided to learn the guitar and also adopted Holly-style dark-rimmed glasses.

He chose his stage name while launching his career. It is an amalgamation of his childhood nickname, Hank, and the first name of American country singer Marvin Rainwater.

== Career ==
=== The Shadows ===
He moved to London in April 1958 after persuading his parents to let him do so in pursuit of a career in the music business. Sixteen-year-old Marvin and his Rutherford Grammar School friend, Bruce Welch, met Johnny Foster, Cliff Richard's manager, at The 2i's Coffee Bar in Soho, London. Foster was looking for a guitarist for Cliff Richard's UK tour and was considering Tony Sheridan. Instead he offered Marvin the position. Marvin agreed to join the Drifters, as Cliff Richard's group was then known, provided there was a place for Welch.

Marvin met Richard for the first time at a nearby Soho tailor's shop, where Richard was having a fitting for a stage jacket. The Drifters had their first rehearsal with Richard at the Webb family home (Cliff's parents) in Cheshunt, Hertfordshire. After a threat of legal action by representatives of the American band of the same name, the Drifters became the Shadows in 1959.

The Shadows were known for their instrumental songs, mainly; "Apache" (1960), "F.B.I." (1961), "Wonderful Land" (1962), and "Foot Tapper" (1963), among many others. The band split up briefly between 1968 and 1973, but was reformed by Marvin, Welch and Bennett.

Marvin and the Shadows reformed for a 2004 Final Tour, and a 2005 European tour was also undertaken. Cliff Richard and the Shadows performed the final tour dates in 2009 and 2010.

=== Solo career ===
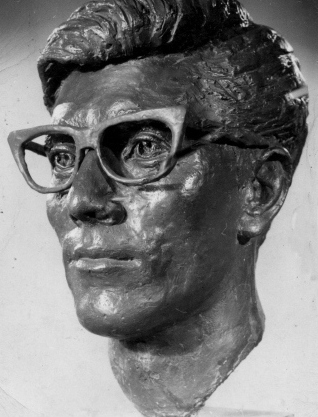
Sculpture of Hank Marvin by artist Victor Heyfron M.A. 1964

Marvin's first critically lauded, eponymous solo album of instrumentals, which featured guitar set to orchestrated backing, was released in 1969, following the first disbanding of the Shadows, in late 1968. The single "Sacha" topped the singles chart in New South Wales, Australia, having been 'discovered' by two DJs at 2WG Wagga Wagga. Marvin has experimented with styles and material, releasing some instrumental albums, some with mostly vocals (e.g. Words and Music, All Alone With Friends), one with only acoustic guitars and one with a guitar orchestra (The Hank Marvin Guitar Syndicate).

In 1970, Marvin and Welch formed Marvin, Welch & Farrar, a vocal-harmony trio. They became 'Marvin & Farrar' for a vocal album in 1973 and then reverted to the Shadows in late 1973, for the instrumental Rockin' with Curly Leads album. The Shadows came second for the United Kingdom in the 1975 Eurovision Song Contest with "Let Me Be the One".

Marvin wrote "Driftin'", "Geronimo", "Spider Juice" (his daughter's name for orange juice), "I Want You to Want Me" for the Shadows, and "The Day I Met Marie". He co-wrote Richard's 1961 hit; "Gee Whizz It's You" with Ian Samwell. With Welch, Brian Bennett, and John Rostill, he wrote hits for Cliff Richard, including; "On the Beach", "I Could Easily Fall in Love with You", "Time Drags By", and "In the Country".

In 1969 and 1970, he teamed with Richard for: two 'Cliff & Hank' hit singles, his own song; "Throw Down a Line" (also recorded by Marvin, Welch & Farrar), and "The Joy of Living", while Richard also had a hit with his ecology song, "Silvery Rain". "Silvery Rain" was covered by Olivia Newton-John on her 1981 album Physical.

In 1977, Marvin played lead guitar on Roger Daltrey's third solo album, One of the Boys, on the tracks Parade and Leon. He co-wrote Olivia Newton-John's 1977 hit "Sam" with John Farrar and Don Black.

In 1988, Marvin collaborated with French keyboardist and composer Jean Michel Jarre on the track "London Kid", on Jarre's Revolutions album and was a guest in Jarre's Destination Docklands concert at London's Royal Victoria Dock. Jarre said the Shadows' success had influenced him and led to his decision to devote his career to instrumental music.

In 1992, Duane Eddy guested on Marvin's album Into the Light on the track "Pipeline".

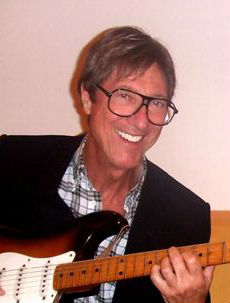
Hank Marvin in 2007

Marvin dueted twice with French guitarist Jean-Pierre Danel – on his 2007 and 2010 albums, both top-ten hits and certified gold. Marvin also participated on one of his DVDs and wrote the foreword for Danel's book about the Fender Stratocaster.

Marvin has continued to release instrumental solo albums, all of which have reached the UK Top 10 album charts since 2002. His latest solo album, Without a Word, was released in 2017.

In 2024, Marvin contributed guitar to a re-release of Mark Knopfler's "Going Home: Theme of the Local Hero" in aid of the Teenage Cancer Trust. In 2025, a group of musicians including Marvin and Roger Taylor recorded a version of "Let There Be Drums" in support of the Cure Parkinson's charity.

== Personal life ==
Marvin's first wife was Beryl, with whom he had four children. He is currently married to Carole and he has two more children.

Since 1986, Marvin has lived in Perth, Western Australia. He became an Australian citizen in 1990. He has made impromptu appearances on stage when musician friends visit the area, such as in February 2013 when Cliff Richard held a concert at Sandalford Winery. He is a Jehovah's Witness.

== Style and influence ==
According to Guitar.com, "In 1960 [Marvin] defined the role of 'lead guitarist'" and "became the first British 'guitar hero'". The website continued, "Hank is legendary for his expressive phrasing, but rather than use his Strat's controls to accentuate volume swells, he prefers to use a pedal to give that vocal quality to his lines." Marvin influenced many British rock guitarists, including George Harrison, Eric Clapton, David Gilmour, Brian May, Mark Knopfler, Peter Frampton, Steve Howe, Roy Wood, Tony Iommi, Pete Townshend, Jeff Beck and Jimmy Page.

In 1959, Cliff Richard purchased a fiesta red Fender Stratocaster for Marvin to use on stage, which is widely claimed to be the first Stratocaster in the United Kingdom. Although it allegedly still belongs to Richard, it has been in the possession of Bruce Welch since 1968. Marvin has performed on stage almost exclusively with fiesta red Stratocasters since Richard's original purchase.

In Canada, Cliff Richard and the Shadows had top 10 hits, especially from 1961 to 1965. Canadian guitarists Randy Bachman and Neil Young credit Marvin as influential, Young penning the song "From Hank to Hendrix" on his Harvest Moon album in partial tribute.

== Awards ==
While Welch and Bennett were both appointed Officer of the Order of the British Empire (OBE) in the 2004 Birthday Honours for services to music, Marvin declined for "personal reasons".

On 28 October 2009, Marvin was presented with a BASCA Gold Badge Award in recognition of his unique contribution to music.

== Early group personnel ==
- 1955–1956 Riverside Skiffle group Crescent City Skiffle Group: Marvin (banjo), John Tate (guitar), Derek Johnson (guitar), Joe Rankin (bass), Mal Malarky (mandolin), and Howard Muir (wb), John Clayton (guitar)
- 1956–1957 Crescent City Skiffle Group: Marvin (guitar), Derek Johnson (banjo), Joe Rankin (bass), Mal Malarky (mandolin), and Howard Muir (guitar), John Clayton (guitar)
- 1957 The Railroaders (No. 1): Marvin (guitar), Welch (guitar), George Williams (guitar), John Clayton (guitar), Jim (drums)
- 1957–1958 The Railroaders (No. 2): Marvin (guitar), Welch (guitar), Eddie Silver (guitar), George Williams (bass), and Jim ? (drums)
- 1958 The Vipers (aka the Vipers Skiffle group) live concert: Wally Whyton (vocals), Johnny Booker (guitar), Hank Marvin (guitar), Jet Harris (bass) and Johnny Pilgrim (wb)
- 1958 The Five Chesternuts 7" single ("Jean Dorothy" on Columbia): Gerry Hurst (vocals), Marvin (guitar), Welch (guitar), Neil Johnson (bass) and Pete Chester (drums)

== UK solo tours ==
- 1994 – w/Ben Marvin (guitar), Warren Bennett (guitar/keyboards/vocals), Mark Griffiths (bass/vocals), Brian Bennett (drums)
- 1995 – w/Ben Marvin (guitar), Warren Bennett (guitar/keyboards/vocals), Mark Griffiths (bass/vocals), Peter May (drums)
- 1997 – w/Ben Marvin (guitar), Warren Bennett (guitar/keyboards/vocals), Mark Griffiths (bass/vocals), Matthew Letley (drums)
- 1998 – w/Ben Marvin (guitar), Warren Bennett (guitar/keyboards/vocals), Mark Griffiths (bass/vocals), Matthew Letley (drums)
- 2000 – w/Ben Marvin (guitar), Warren Bennett (guitar/keyboards/vocals), Mark Griffiths (bass/vocals), Matthew Letley (drums) (Continental leg) and Peter May (drums) (UK leg)
- 2002 – w/Ben Marvin (guitar), Warren Bennett (guitar/keyboards/vocals), Mark Griffiths (bass/vocals), Fergus Gerrand (drums)

== Production credits ==
- Spaghetti Junction Work's Nice – If You Can Get It/Step Right Up Columbia DB 8935
- Des O'Connor – Another Side Des O'Connor – LP – NSPL 18559.
- Flair – Stop Look & Listen – LP – MLP 15611.
- Flair – Fair – LP – CC 227324
- Flair – Fair Play – LP – CC 327224

== Duets and guest appearances ==
- 1972: Spaghetti Junction Work's Nice – If You Can Get It/Step Right Up Columbia DB 8935
- 1976: Evita: guitar on "Buenos Aires"
- 1977: Dennis Waterman Waterman (also features Brian Bennett)
- 1977: Roger Daltrey One of the Boys – guitar on "Parade" and "Leon"
- 1978: Des O'Connor Another Side of Des O'Connor
- 1979: Wings Back to the Egg – "Rockestra Theme" and "So Glad to See You Here"
- 1982: British Electric Foundation Music of Quality and Distinction Volume 1, guitar on "Anyone Who Had a Heart" with Sandie Shaw and "It's Over" with Billy MacKenzie
- 1983: Tracey Ullman You Broke My Heart in 17 Places: guitar on "Move Over Darling" and "You Broke My Heart in 17 Places"
- 1983: Leo Sayer Have You Ever Been in Love : guitar on "Don't Wait Until Tomorrow"
- 1984: Shakin' Stevens "Teardrops" single
- 1985: Dire Straits plays "Going Home" ("Local Hero Theme"), with the band, as a special guest at Live at Wembley
- 1986: Cliff Richard and The Young Ones "Living Doll" (UK charts No. 1)
- 1988: Jean Michel Jarre Revolutions guitar on "London Kid" (UK charts No. 52)
- 1989: Jean Michel Jarre Destination Docklands: guitar on "London Kid" and "Rendez-Vous IV"
- 1992: Brian May We are the Champions Instrumental cover
- 1995: Alan Jones A Shadow in Time album: guest on title track "A Shadow in Time"
- 1998: Jane McDonald "You're My World" single
- 2004: The Strat Pack: guitar on "The Rise and Fall of Flingel Bunt," "Sleep Walk" and "Apache"
- 2005: Richard Hawley "I'm Absolutely Hank Marvin", B-side of "Coles Corner" single
- 2007: Peter Frampton Fingerprints: guitar on "My Cup of Tea" (also features Brian Bennett)
- 2007: Jean-Pierre Danel "Nivram" (French Charts No. 15, No. 8 Norway, No. 86 Germany) + Blues jam session on DVD
- 2008: Jason Donovan "Let It Be Me" on Dreamboats and Petticoats
- 2008: Le QuecumBar Patrons "Stars of Gypsy Swing" ("Coquette", "Noto Swing")
- 2010: Jean-Pierre Danel "M Appeal" (Norwegian charts No. 7, Finland No. 99)

Marvin also played guitar on the following tracks of library music recorded for Bruton Music:

- "Fighter Plane" (with Alan Hawkshaw) on Top of the Range
- "Conquest of Space" (with Alan Hawkshaw) on Grandiose Impressive Panoramic
- "Human Desert" (with Alan Hawkshaw) on Human Desert

== See also ==
- List of guitarists
- List of people from Newcastle upon Tyne
