= The Shadows discography =

- Studio albums: 21
- Extended plays: 25
- Live albums: 5
- Compilation albums: 35
- Singles: 67
- Video albums: 4

The solo discography of British rock group the Shadows consists of 21 studio albums, five live albums, 25 EPs and 67 singles. They are known for having been the backing group for Cliff Richard in the 1950s and 1960s; however, they were also extremely successful without Richard, and had several number-one hits, notably their first "Apache" in 1960.

== Albums ==
=== Studio albums ===
Title	Album details	Peak chart positions						Certifications
Title	Album details	UK	AUS	FIN	GER	NL	NZ	Certifications
The Shadows	Released: September 1961; Label: Columbia; Formats: LP, reel-to-reel	1	—	—	—	—	—	
Out of the Shadows	Released: October 1962; Label: Columbia; Formats: LP, reel-to-reel	1	—	—	18	—	—	
Dance with the Shadows	Released: May 1964; Label: Columbia; Formats: LP, reel-to-reel	2	—	—	11	—	—	
The Sound of the Shadows	Released: June 1965; Label: Columbia; Formats: LP, reel-to-reel	4	—	3	—	—	—	
Shadow Music	Released: May 1966; Label: Columbia; Formats: LP, reel-to-reel	5	—	—	—	—	—	
Jigsaw	Released: July 1967; Label: Columbia; Formats: LP, reel-to-reel	8	7	13	—	—	—	
From Hank, Bruce, Brian and John	Released: 1 December 1967; Label: Columbia; Formats: LP, reel-to-reel	—	—	—	—	—	—	
Shades of Rock	Released: October 1970; Label: Columbia; Formats: LP, MC, 8-track	30	—	—	—	—	—	
Rockin' with Curly Leads	Released: November 1973; Label: EMI; Formats: LP, MC, 8-track	45	—	—	—	—	—	
Specs Appeal	Released: March 1975; Label: Columbia; Formats: LP, MC, 8-track	30	—	29	—	—	—	
Tasty	Released: August 1977; Label: EMI; Formats: LP, MC, 8-track	—	—	—	—	—	—	
String of Hits	Released: August 1979; Label: EMI; Formats: LP, MC	1	—	1	—	7	—	UK: Platinum; FIN: Gold; NL: Gold
Change of Address	Released: September 1980; Label: Polydor; Formats: LP, MC	17	—	16	—	33	—	UK: Silver
Hits Right Up Your Street	Released: September 1981; Label: EMI; Formats: LP, MC	15	—	—	—	—	—	UK: Silver
Life in the Jungle	Released: September 1982; Label: Polydor; Formats: LP, MC	24	—	—	—	—	—	
XXV	Released: October 1983; Label: EMI; Formats: LP, MC	34	38	—	—	—	33	
Guardian Angel	Released: November 1984; Label: Polydor; Formats: CD, LP, MC	98	—	—	—	—	6	
Moonlight Shadows	Released: 16 May 1986; Label: Polydor; Formats: CD, LP, MC	6	37	—	—	65	3	UK: Gold
Simply Shadows	Released: October 1987; Label: Polydor; Formats: CD, LP, MC	11	—	—	—	—	31	UK: Platinum
Steppin' to the Shadows	Released: 8 May 1989; Label: Polydor; Formats: CD, LP, MC	11	—	—	—	—	31	UK: Gold
Reflection	Released: 1 October 1990; Label: Polydor; Formats: CD, LP, MC	5	—	—	—	—	—	UK: Platinum
"—" denotes releases that did not chart or were not released in that territory.

=== Live albums ===
Title	Album details	Peak chart positions	
Title	Album details	UK	DEN
"Live" in Japan	Released: March 1970; Label: Odeon; Formats: LP	—	—
Live at the Paris Olympia	Released: 7 November 1975; Label: EMI; Formats: LP, MC, 8-track	—	—
Live at Abbey Road	Released: September 1982; Label: Polydor; Formats: LP, MC; Only released as a bonus album with the Life in the Jungle studio album	—	—
The Final Tour	Released: November 2004; Label: Eagle; Formats: 2xCD	37 (Note: The Final Tour originally peaked at number 78 when released in 2004, but charted higher at number 37 when reissued in 2020.)	5
Live at the BBC	Released: 26 October 2018; Label: Parlophone; Formats: CD, digital download	—	—
"—" denotes releases that did not chart or were not released in that territory.

=== Compilation albums ===
==== Main compilation albums ====
Title	Album details	Peak chart positions					Certifications
Title	Album details	UK	AUS	FIN	NL	NZ	Certifications
The Shadows Greatest Hits	Released: June 1963; Label: Columbia; Formats: LP, reel-to-reel	2	—	—	—	—	
20 Golden Greats	Released: 28 January 1977; Label: EMI; Formats: LP, MC, 8-track	1	6	—	2 (Note: Released in the Netherlands in 1980 as 20 Greatest Hits.)	26 (Note: Charted in New Zealand in 1985.)	UK: Platinum; NL: Platinum
Another String of Hot Hits	Released: 14 July 1980; Label: EMI; Formats: LP, MC	16	—	7	39	—	UK: Silver
At Their Very Best	Released: December 1989; Label: Polydor; Formats: CD, LP, MC	12	—	28	—	—	UK: Gold
Themes and Dreams	Released: 4 November 1991; Label: Polydor; Formats: CD, LP, MC	21	—	—	—	—	UK: Gold
Shadows in the Night	Released: 3 May 1993; Label: PolyGram; Formats: CD, MC	22	—	—	—	—	
50 Golden Greats	Released: July 2000; Label: EMI; Formats: 2xCD, 2xMC	35	—	—	—	—	UK: Gold
Complete Singles As & Bs 1959–1980	Released: 26 April 2004; Label: EMI; Formats: 4xCD	—	—	—	—	—	
Life Story – The Very Best of the Shadows	Released: 2004; Label: Universal Music TV; Formats: 2xCD	7	—	—	—	—	UK: Gold
Platinum Collection	Released: 15 August 2005; Label: EMI; Formats: 2xCD	30	—	—	8 (Note: Released in the Netherlands as The Final Collection.)	—	
The First 60 Years	Released: 13 November 2020; Label: Decca; Formats: 2xCD, digital download	22	—	—	—	—	
"—" denotes releases that did not chart or were not released in that territory.

==== Budget compilation albums ====
Title	Album details
Somethin' Else!!	Released: November 1969; Label: Regal; Formats: LP
Mustang	Released: October 1972; Label: Music for Pleasure; Formats: LP
The Shadows at the Movies	Released: January 1978; Label: Music for Pleasure; Formats: LP, MC
Rock on with the Shadows	Released: February 1980; Label: Music for Pleasure; Formats: LP, MC
The Shadows Live	Released: 22 May 1981; Label: Music for Pleasure; Formats: 2xLP, MC
Silver Album	Released: August 1983; Label: Tellydisc; Formats: 2xLP, MC
The EP Collection	Released: 20 February 1989; Label: See for Miles; Formats: LP, MC
The EP Collection Volume Two	Released: 1990; Label: See for Miles; Formats: CD, LP, MC
The EP Collection Volume Three	Released: 1993; Label: See for Miles; Formats: CD
The Best of the Shadows	Released: 1995; Label: Music for Pleasure; Formats: CD, MC
The Very Best of the Shadows	Released: 1997; Label: Music for Pleasure/EMI 100; Formats: CD, MC
Essential Collection	Released: April 2004; Label: EMI Gold; Formats: 2xCD
The Collection	Released: August 2013; Label: Music Club Deluxe; Formats: 2xCD

==== Foreign compilation albums ====
Title	Album details	Peak chart positions				
Title	Album details	DEN	GER	NL	NOR	NZ
The Shadows' Bestsellers	Released: April 1963; Label: Columbia; Formats: LP	—	11	—	—	—
The Great Shadows	Released: February 1964; Label: Columbia; Formats: LP	—	19	—	—	—
Brilliant Shadows – Brilliant Songs	Released: May 1964; Label: Columbia; Formats: LP	—	20	—	—	—
Space Hits	Released: February 1983; Label: Polydor; Formats: LP, MC	—	—	22	—	—
20 Golden Greats Volume 2	Released: January 1984; Label: EMI; Formats: LP, MC	—	—	—	—	7
The Shadows Collection	Released: 1987; Label: EMI; Formats: 2xCD, 2xMC	—	—	—	—	14
Guitars in Love	Released: July 1987; Label: Dino Music; Formats: CD, LP, MC	—	—	41	—	—
The Definitive Guitar Album	Released: February 1989; Label: EVA; Formats: 2xCD, 2xLP, 2xMC	—	—	66	—	—
Wonderful Shadows	Released: 1997; Label: CMC; Formats: CD	5	—	—	—	—
Kon Tiki: De Beste 1960–1980	Released: February 2001; Label: EMI; Formats: CD	—	—	—	3	—
"—" denotes releases that did not chart or were not released in that territory.

=== Box sets ===
Title	Album details
The Shadows Collection	Released: September 1981; Label: World; Formats: 6xLP, 6xMC
The Shadows Collection	Released: 1991; Label: Reader's Digest; Formats: 6xCD, 8xLP, 4xMC
The Early Years	Released: 1991; Label: EMI; Formats: 6xCD
The Shadows Complete	Released: 1999; Label: EMI; Formats: 5xCD
Original Album Series	Released: 20 February 2015; Label: Parlophone/Warner Music; Formats: 5xCD
Boxing the Shadows 1980–1990	Released: 3 November 2017; Label: Edsel; Formats: 11xCD

=== Video albums ===
Title	Album details
The Shadows Live	Released: May 1986; Label: Picture Music International; Formats: VHS
At Their Very Best Live	Released: November 1989; Label: PolyGram Music Video; Formats: VHS
The Final Tour	Released: 2004; Label: Eagle Vision; Formats: DVD
Live in Liverpool	Released: December 2005; Label: Universal Music; Formats: DVD

== EPs ==
Title	EP details	Peak chart positions
Title	EP details	UK
The Shadows	Released: January 1961; Label: Columbia; Formats: 7"	1
The Shadows to the Fore	Released: May 1961; Label: Columbia; Formats: 7"	1
Spotlight on the Shadows	Released: February 1962; Label: Columbia; Formats: 7"	1
The Shadows No. 2	Released: April 1962; Label: Columbia; Formats: 7"	12
The Shadows No. 3	Released: June 1962; Label: Columbia; Formats: 7"	13
Wonderful Land of the Shadows	Released: August 1962; Label: Columbia; Formats: 7"	6
The Boys	Released: September 1962; Label: Columbia; Formats: 7"	1
Out of the Shadows	Released: February 1963; Label: Columbia; Formats: 7"	3
Dance On with the Shadows	Released: 1 March 1963; Label: Columbia; Formats: 7"	16
Out of the Shadows No. 2	Released: June 1963; Label: Columbia; Formats: 7"	20
Foot Tapping with the Shadows	Released: September 1963; Label: Columbia; Formats: 7"	7
Los Shadows	Released: 6 September 1963; Label: Columbia; Formats: 7"	4
Shindig with the Shadows	Released: December 1963; Label: Columbia; Formats: 7"	8
Those Brilliant Shadows	Released: May 1964; Label: Columbia; Formats: 7"	6
Rhythm & Greens	Released: September 1964; Label: Columbia; Formats: 7"	8
Dance with the Shadows	Released: September 1964; Label: Columbia; Formats: 7"	—
Dance with the Shadows No. 2	Released: December 1964; Label: Columbia; Formats: 7"	—
Themes from Aladdin	Released: March 1965; Label: Columbia; Formats: 7"	14
Dance with the Shadows No. 3	Released: May 1965; Label: Columbia; Formats: 7"	16
Alice in Sunderland	Released: September 1965; Label: Columbia; Formats: 7"	—
The Sound of the Shadows	Released: November 1965; Label: Columbia; Formats: 7"	—
The Sound of the Shadows No. 2	Released: 4 February 1966; Label: Columbia; Formats: 7"	—
The Sound of the Shadows No. 3	Released: August 1966; Label: Columbia; Formats: 7"	—
Those Talented Shadows	Released: September 1966; Label: Columbia; Formats: 7"	9
On Stage and Screen	Released: May 1967; Label: Columbia; Formats: 7"	—
"—" denotes releases that did not chart.

== Singles ==
=== 1950s–1960s ===
Single (A-side, B-side) Both sides from same album except where indicated	Year	Peak chart positions										Certifications (Note: The British Disc music paper awarded silver discs (for UK sales of 250,000) from 1959 until 1973. Awards were based on sales figures submitted by record companies. In 1973, it was superseded by the British Phonographic Industry (BPI) setting up an 'official' certification award system.)	Album
Single (A-side, B-side) Both sides from same album except where indicated	Year	UK	AUS	BEL (FLA)	GER	IRE	NL	NZ	NOR	SPA	SWE	Certifications	Album
"Feelin' Fine" b/w "Don't Be a Fool (With Love)" As the Drifters	1959	—	—	—	—	—	—	—	—	—	—		Non-album singles
"Jet Black" b/w "Driftin'" As the Drifters	1959	—	—	—	—	—	—	—	—	—	—		Non-album singles
"Lonesome Fella" b/w "Saturday Dance"	1959	—	—	—	—	—	—	—	—	—	—		Non-album singles
"Apache" b/w "Quatermasster's Stores"	1960	1	4	6	6	1	11	1	—	8	—	UK: Gold	Non-album singles
"Man of Mystery" b/w "The Stranger"	1960	5	— 88	—	—	—	14	—	—	—	—	UK: Silver	Non-album singles
"F.B.I." b/w "Midnight"	1961	6	60	18	—	—	18	3	—	—	—	UK: Silver	Non-album singles
"The Frightened City" b/w "Back Home"	1961	3	—	—	—	7	—	7	—	—	—	UK: Silver	Non-album singles
"Kon-Tiki" b/w "36-24-36"	1961	1	4	—	29	—	12	5	7	—	—		Non-album singles
"Shadoogie" (Note: "Shadoogie" was only released as a single in Scandinavia, Finland, France and Belgium.) b/w "Blue Star" / "Quatermasster's Stores" (non-album track)	1961	—	—	—	—	—	—	—	—	—	—		The Shadows
"The Savage" b/w "Peace Pipe"	1961	10	8	—	—	—	—	—	—	—	—		The Young Ones
"Wonderful Land" b/w "Stars Fell on Stockton"	1962	1	2	13	23	1	2	1	2	—	—	UK: Silver	Non-album singles
"Guitar Tango" b/w "What a Lovely Tune"	1962	4	6	18	25	3	5	5	10	15	7	UK: Silver	Non-album singles
"The Boys" (Note: "The Boys" was only released as a single in Australia and Scandinavia.) b/w "The Girls"	1962	—	1	—	—	—	—	1	—	—	—		Non-album singles
"Dance On!" b/w "All Day"	1962	1	9	14	45	1	8	2	2	16	3	UK: Silver	Non-album singles
"Foot Tapper" b/w "The Breeze and I" (from Somethin' Else!!)	1963	1	2	—	—	2	7	2	5	—	3	UK: Silver	Summer Holiday
"Atlantis" b/w "I Want You to Want Me"	1963	2	3	11	23	3	6	4	4	18	4	UK: Silver	Non-album singles
"Shindig" b/w "It's Been a Blue Day"	1963	6	10	—	—	7	24	—	5	—	14		Non-album singles
"Geronimo" b/w "Shazam"	1963	11	8	—	—	10	29	—	10	18	—		Non-album singles
"Theme for Young Lovers" b/w "This Hammer" (non-album track)	1964	12	19	—	—	—	35	—	—	—	15		Wonderful Life
"The Rise and Fall of Flingel Bunt" b/w "It's a Man's World"	1964	5	5	—	—	—	—	4	—	—	13		Non-album singles
"Rhythm & Greens" b/w "The Miracle"	1964	22	21	—	—	—	—	—	—	—	—		Non-album singles
"Genie with the Light Brown Lamp" b/w "Little Princess"	1964	17	22	—	—	—	18	—	—	—	—		Non-album singles
"Mary Anne" b/w "Chu-Chi"	1965	17	53	—	—	—	—	—	—	—	—		Non-album singles
"Stingray" b/w "Alice in Sunderland"	1965	19	12	—	—	—	—	—	—	—	—		Non-album singles
"Don't Make My Baby Blue" b/w "My Grandfather's Clock"	1965	10	39	—	—	—	34	12	—	—	—		Non-album singles
"The War Lord" b/w "I Wish I Could Shimmy Like My Sister Arthur"	1965	18	30	—	—	—	—	—	—	—	—		Non-album singles
"I Met a Girl" b/w "Late Night Set"	1966	22	—	—	—	—	—	—	—	—	—		Non-album singles
"A Place in the Sun" b/w "Will You Be There"	1966	24	—	—	—	—	—	—	—	—	—		Non-album singles
"The Dream I Dream" b/w "Scotch on the Socks"	1966	42	—	—	—	—	—	—	—	—	—		Non-album singles
"Maroc 7" b/w "Bombay Duck"	1967	24	— 49	—	—	—	—	—	—	—	—		Non-album singles
"Tomorrow's Cancelled" b/w "Somewhere"	1967	57	—	—	—	—	—	—	—	—	—		Non-album singles
"Dear Old Mrs Bell" b/w "Trying to Forget the One You Love"	1968	—	—	—	—	—	—	—	—	—	—		Non-album singles
"Slaughter on Tenth Avenue" b/w "Midnight Cowboy" (Hank Marvin solo track)	1969	—	—	—	—	—	—	—	—	—	—		Non-album singles
"—" denotes releases that did not chart or were not released in that territory.

=== 1970s ===
Single (A-side, B-side) Both sides from same album except where indicated	Year	Peak chart positions								Certifications	Album
Single (A-side, B-side) Both sides from same album except where indicated	Year	UK	BEL (FLA)	FIN	GER	IRE	NL	NOR	SPA	Certifications	Album
"River Deep Mountain High" (Note: "River Deep Mountain High" was only released as a single in the Netherlands and Belgium.) b/w "Lucille"	1970	—	—	—	—	—	—	—	—		Shades of Rock
"Turn Around and Touch Me" b/w "Jungle Jam"	1973	—	—	—	—	—	—	—	—		Rockin' with Curly Leads
"Let Me Be the One" b/w "Stand Up Like a Man"	1975	12	21	4	47	10	—	2	14		Specs Appeal
"Run Billy Run" b/w "Honorable Puff-Puff" (from Specs Appeal)	1975	—	—	—	—	—	—	—	—		Non-album singles
"It'll Be Me Babe" b/w "Like Strangers" (from Specs Appeal)	1976	—	—	—	—	—	—	—	—		Non-album singles
"Another Night" b/w "Cricket Bat Boogie"	1977	—	—	—	—	—	—	—	—		Tasty
"Love Deluxe" b/w "Sweet Saturday Night"	1978	80	—	—	—	—	—	—	—		Non-album single
"Don't Cry for Me Argentina" b/w "Montezuma's Revenge" (from Tasty)	1978	5	—	—	—	7	—	—	—	UK: Silver	String of Hits
"Theme from 'The Deer Hunter' (Cavatina)" b/w "Bermuda Triangle" (from Tasty)	1979	9	1	10	—	8	1	—	—	UK: Silver; NL: Gold	String of Hits
"Rodrigo's Guitar Concerto de Aranjuez" b/w "Song for Duke"	1979	—	—	—	—	—	—	—	—		String of Hits
"—" denotes releases that did not chart or were not released in that territory.

=== 1980s ===
Single (A-side, B-side) Both sides from same album except where indicated	Year	Peak chart positions				Album
Single (A-side, B-side) Both sides from same album except where indicated	Year	UK	FIN	IRE	NZ	Album
"Riders in the Sky" b/w "Rusk" (non-album track)	1980	12	21	6	—	String of Hits
"Heart of Glass" b/w "Return to the Alamo" (from Tasty)	1980	—	—	—	—	String of Hits
"Equinoxe (Part V)" b/w "Fender Bender" (non-album track)	1980	50	—	—	—	Change of Address
"Mozart Forte" b/w "Fender Bender"	1980	—	—	—	—	Change of Address
"Black Is Black" (Note: "Black Is Black" was only released as a single in Finland.) b/w "Return to the Alamo" (from Tasty)	1980	—	29	—	—	Non-album single
"The Third Man" b/w "The Fourth Man"	1981	44	—	—	—	Hits Right Up Your Street
"Telstar" b/w "Summer Love '59"	1981	—	—	—	—	Hits Right Up Your Street
"Imagine/Woman" b/w "Hats Off to Wally"	1981	—	—	—	—	Hits Right Up Your Street
"Chi Mai" (Note: "Chi Mai" was only released as a single in the Netherlands.) b/w "Summer Love '59"	1981	—	—	—	—	Hits Right Up Your Street
"Theme from Missing" b/w "The Shady Lady" (non-album track)	1982	—	—	—	—	Life in the Jungle
"Treat Me Nice" b/w "Spot the Ball" (non-album track)	1982	—	—	—	—	Life in the Jungle
"Chariots of Fire" (Note: "Chariots of Fire" was only released as a single in Finland.) b/w "Life in the Jungle"	1982	—	—	—	—	Life in the Jungle
"Diamonds" b/w "Elevenis" (non-album track)	1983	132	—	—	—	XXV
"Going Home (Theme from Local Hero)" b/w "Cat 'n' Mouse"	1983	112	—	—	—	XXV
"On a Night Like This" b/w "Thing-Me-Jig" (from Hits Right Up Your Street)	1984	107	—	—	—	Guardian Angel
"How Do I Love Thee" (Note: "How Do I Love Thee" was only released as a single in New Zealand) b/w "Johnny Staccato"	1984	—	—	—	34	Guardian Angel
"Hammerhead" (Note: "Hammerhead" was only released as a single in Australia.) b/w "Can't Play Your Game"	1985	—	—	—	—	Guardian Angel
"Moonlight Shadow" b/w "Johnny Staccato" (from Guardian Angel)	1986	108	—	—	—	Moonlight Shadows
"Dancing in the Dark" b/w "Turning Point" (from Guardian Angel)	1986	175	—	—	—	Moonlight Shadows
"Themes from EastEnders and Howards' Way" b/w "No Dancing" (from Life in the Jungle)	1986	86	—	—	—	Simply Shadows
"Pulaski" (Theme from the BBC TV series) b/w "Change of Address" (from Change of Address)	1987	108	—	—	—	Simply Shadows
"Walking in the Air" b/w "Outdigo" (from Change of Address)	1987	116	—	—	—	Simply Shadows
"Mountains of the Moon" b/w "Stack-It"	1989	108	—	—	—	Steppin' to the Shadows
"Shadowmix" (medley) b/w "Arty's Party" (from Change of Address)	1989	81	—	—	—	Reflection
"—" denotes releases that did not chart or were not released in that territory.

== Sheet music (musical notation) ==
All the hit (& misses) singles e.g. Apache (et al.) were published as individual (2xA4 page) sheet music during the release of the single until the late 1970s when publishers switched to books featuring multiple hits.

- A1. The Album of Guitar Favourites, 1961, The Shadows Music Ltd/Belinda Ltd. No ISBN
- A2. The 2nd Album of Guitar Favourities, 1961, The Shadows Music Ltd/Belinda Ltd. No ISBN
- A3. The 3rd Album of Guitar Favourities, 1962, The Shadows Music Ltd/Belinda Ltd. No ISBN
- A4. The 4th Album of Guitar Favourities, 1964, The Shadows Music Ltd/Belinda Ltd. No ISBN
- A5. The 5th Album of Guitar Favourities, 1964, The Shadows Music Ltd/Belinda Ltd. No ISBN
- A6. The 6th Album of Guitar Favourities, 1965, The Shadows Music Ltd/Belinda Ltd. No ISBN
- A7. The 7th Album of Guitar Favourities, 1966, The Shadows Music Ltd/Belinda Ltd. No ISBN
- A8. The 8th Album of Guitar Favourities, 1966, The Shadows Music Ltd/Belinda Ltd. No ISBN
- A9. The 9th Album of Guitar Favourities, 1967, The Shadows Music Ltd/Carlin Music Ltd. No ISBN
- A10. The Shadows Album of Rhythm & Greens, 1964, The Shadows Music Ltd/Belinda Music Ltd. No ISBN
- A11. The Shadows Modern Electric Guitar Tutor, 196?, The Shadows Music Ltd/Belinda Ltd. No ISBN
- A12. The Shadows Guitar Book, 1964, Francis, Day & Hunter. No ISBN
- A13. The Shadows Then and Now, 1981, EMI Music Publishing. ISBN ?
- A14. The Big Hits of The Shadows, 19??, Wise Publications, ISBN 0-7119-0815-X
- A15. The Shadows, Guitar Legends Tab, 19??, Faber Music, ISBN 978-0-571-52585-0
- A16. Hits of The Shadows. Off the record., 1992, IMP, ISBN ?
- A17. Frank Ifield Album, 196?, Shadows Music/Belinda, no ISBN
- A18. The Mersey Beat, 196?, Shadows music/Belinda, no ISBN
- A19. Marvin Welch and Farrar, 1970, Music Sales Ltd. ISBN
- B1. Cliff and the Shadows Album, 196?, B.Feldman & co ltd, no ISBN
- B2. The Young Ones & Summer Holiday 1963, Elstree Music ltd, no ISBN
- B3. Finders Keepers, 1966, Carlin Music, no ISBN
- B4. Aladdin—Guitar album, 1964, Shadows Music/Belinda, no ISBN
- B5. Aladdin—Vocal album, 1964, Shadows Music/Belinda, no ISBN
- B6. Established 1958, 1968, Shadows Music/Carlin Music, no ISBN
- C1. Play Guitar with Hank Marvin, 200?, Wise Publications, ISBN 978-0-7119-8092-1
- C2. Lick Library: Learn to play Hank Marvin, 200?, Roadrock Intl, ISBN "RDR0061"
- C3. Jam with Hank Marvin, 200?, Faber Music, ISBN 978-0-571-52732-8
- C4. Hank Marvin's Guitar Instruction Book, 200?, Hudson Music, ISBN 0-7119-9369-6
- C5. Lick Library: Learn to play Hank Marvin (Vol.2), 200?, Roadrock Intl, ISBN "RDR0061"
- C6. Hank Marvin's Guitar Tutor, 200?, IMP, ISBN 978-0-86359-749-7
- D1. Diamonds—piano solo with guitar chords, 1963, Francis day and Hunter, ISBN ?
- D2. The Jet Harris Guitar book, Francis Day & Hunter Ltd. [ISBN unspecified] (16 pages)
- E1. Brian Bennett's Drum Tutor, 196?, ?, ISBN ?
- E2. Guide to Teen-Beat Drumming, 1964, the Shadows Music Ltd & Belinda London Ltd.

Sheet Music (sold as individual song/tune sheets)

- Apache (2 designs)
- Quartermasters Stores
- Man of Mystery (2 designs)
- The Stranger
- F.B.I.
- The Frightened City
- Kon Tiki (2 designs)
- The Savage
- Wonderful Land (2 designs)
- Stars fell on stockton
- Guitar Tango
- Dance On
- The Boys
- The Girls
- Foot Tapper
- Atlantis
- Shindig
- Geronimo
- Shazam!
- The Rise and Fall of Flingel Bunt
- Rhythm & Greens
- The Miracle
- Alice in Sunderland
- Stingray
- Mary Anne
- Chu-Chi
- Don't Make My Baby Blue
- The War Lord
- I Wish I Could Shimmy Like My Sister Arthur
- I Met a Girl
- Scotch on the Socks
- The Dreams I Dream
- A Place in the Sun
- Maroc 7
- Bombay Duck
- Thunderbirds theme
- Let Me Be the One
- Run Billy Run
- Riders in the Sky

== See also ==
- For the Shadows' recordings with Cliff Richard, see Cliff Richard albums discography and Cliff Richard singles discography
- For the solo discography of Shadows' member Hank Marvin, see Hank Marvin discography
