= Moonlight Shadows =

Studio album by The Shadows
- Released: 16 May 1986
- Recorded: May and June 1981, May and June 1983 and February and March 1986
- Genre: Instrumental rock
- Label: Polydor
- Producers: The Shadows, Bruce Welch

The Shadows chronology
Guardian Angel (1984)	Moonlight Shadows (1986)	Simply...Shadows (1987)

Moonlight Shadows is the seventeenth album by British instrumental group The Shadows, released in 1986 through Polydor Records. The album reached number 6 in a 16-week run on the UK Album Charts.

This album consists entirely of cover songs by The Police, Lionel Richie, Jennifer Rush, The Beatles, Phil Collins, Elaine Paige, Bruce Springsteen, Procol Harum, Mike Oldfield, The Commodores, Rod Stewart, Stevie Wonder, Elaine Paige & Barbara Dickson, The Moody Blues, John Lennon & Dire Straits. Several tracks were lifted from previously released albums; "Sailing" and "Imagine"/"Woman" from Hits Right Up Your Street and "Memory" and "A Whiter Shade of Pale" from XXV.

The only single released from the album was "Moonlight Shadow", which did not chart.

The album was recorded and mixed by Dick Plant at Honeyhill and Nivram Studios, Hertfordshire.

== Release ==
Moonlight Shadows was released on LP and CD simultaneously as the group's third CD release.

== Track listing ==
1. "Every Breath You Take" (Sting)
2. "Hello" (Lionel Richie)
3. "The Power of Love" (Candy De Rouge, Jennifer Rush, Gunther Mende, Mary Susan Applegate)
4. "Hey Jude" (Lennon/McCartney)
5. "Against All Odds" (from Against All Odds) (Phil Collins)
6. "Memory" (from Cats) (Andrew Lloyd-Webber, T. S. Eliot, Trevor Nunn)
7. "Dancing in the Dark" (Bruce Springsteen)
8. "A Whiter Shade of Pale" (Keith Reid, Gary Brooker)
9. "Moonlight Shadow" (Mike Oldfield)
10. "Three Times a Lady" (Richie)
11. "Sailing" (Gavin Sutherland)
12. "I Just Called to Say I Love You" (from The Woman in Red) (Stevie Wonder)
13. "I Know Him So Well" (from Chess) (Benny Andersson, Bjorn Ulvaeus, Tim Rice)
14. "Nights in White Satin" (Justin Hayward)
15. "Imagine"/"Woman" (John Lennon)
16. "Walk of Life" (Mark Knopfler)

== Personnel ==
- Hank Marvin—Lead Guitar
- Bruce Welch—Rhythm Guitar
- Brian Bennett—Drums, Percussion
- Cliff Hall—Keyboards (except track 8)

With

- Paul Westwood —Bass Guitar (tracks 1 to 5, 7, 9, 10, 12 to 14 and 16)
- Alan Jones—Bass Guitar (tracks 6, 8, 11 and 15)
- Alan Hawkshaw—Keyboards (track 8)

== Certifications ==
Region	Certification	Certified units/sales
New Zealand (RMNZ)	Gold	7,500^{^}
^{^} Shipments figures based on certification alone.
