= Life in the Jungle =

Life in the Jungle may refer to:

- Life in the Jungle (Shadows album), 1982
- Life in the Jungle (Walter Trout album), 1989
