= Change of Address =

Change of Address may refer to:

- Change of address
- Change of Address (Krokus album), 1986
- Change of Address (The Shadows album), 1980
- "Change of Address", a promotional single by Blind Faith, 1969
