= Hank Marvin discography =

- Studio albums: 15
- Live albums: 1
- Compilation albums: 15
- Singles: 17
- Video albums: 1

This is the discography of British multi-instrumentalist Hank Marvin as a solo artist. For information about works with the Shadows, see The Shadows discography and with Marvin, Welch & Farrar, see Marvin, Welch & Farrar § Discography.

== Albums ==
=== Studio albums ===
Title	Album details	Peak chart positions				
Title	Album details	UK	AUS	DEN	SCO	SWE
Hank Marvin	Released: October 1969; Label: Columbia; Formats: LP	14	—	—	—	—
The Hank Marvin Guitar Syndicate	Released: November 1977; Label: EMI; Formats: LP, MC	—	—	—	—	—
Words and Music	Released: March 1982; Label: Polydor; Formats: LP, MC	66	—	—	—	—
All Alone with Friends	Released: May 1983; Label: Polydor; Formats: LP, MC	—	—	—	—	—
Into the Light	Released: 19 October 1992; Label: Polydor/PolyGram TV; Formats: CD, LP, MC	18	—	—	—	—
Heartbeat	Released: November 1993; Label: Polydor/PolyGram TV; Formats: CD, MC	17	—	—	—	—
Hank Plays Cliff	Released: November 1995; Label: PolyGram TV; Formats: CD, MC	33	—	—	95	—
Hank Plays Holly	Released: 11 November 1996; Label: PolyGram TV; Formats: CD, MC	34	—	—	100	—
Hank Marvin and the Shadows Play the Music of Andrew Lloyd Webber and Tim Rice	Released: 10 November 1997; Label: PolyGram TV; Formats: CD, MC	41	—	—	—	—
Marvin at the Movies	Released: 3 April 2000; Label: Universal Music TV; Formats: CD, MC	17	—	—	34	—
Guitar Player	Released: 8 April 2002; Label: Universal Music TV; Formats: CD	10	—	12	25	29
Guitar Man	Released: 4 June 2007; Label: Universal Music TV; Formats: CD	6	92	—	13	—
Django's Castle (with Nunzio Mondia and Gary Taylor)	Released: 1 April 2013; Label: Mtm Music; Formats: CD, digital download; Australia-only release	—	—	—	—	—
Hank	Released: 2 June 2014; Label: Demon Music Group; Formats: CD, digital download	8	—	—	12	—
Without a Word	Released: 2 June 2017; Label: Demon Music Group; Formats: CD, LP, digital download	9	—	—	9	—
Foolin' with the Feds (with Nunzio Mondia and Gary Taylor)	Released: 2023; Label: Mtm Music; Formats: CD, digital download; Australia-only release	—	—	—	—	—
"—" denotes releases that did not chart or were not released in that territory.

=== Live albums ===
Title	Album details	Peak chart positions
Title	Album details	UK
Hank Plays Live	Released: 24 March 1997; Label: PolyGram TV; Formats: CD, MC	71

=== Compilation albums ===
Title	Album details	Peak chart positions		
Title	Album details	UK	DEN	SCO
Would You Believe It...Plus	Released: November 1987; Label: See for Miles; Formats: LP; Reissue of debut album with bonus tracks	—	—	—
The Best of Hank Marvin and the Shadows	Released: October 1994; Label: PolyGram TV; Formats: CD MC	19	—	53
Handpicked	Released: April 1995; Label: PolyGram TV; Formats: CD MC	—	—	—
Another Side of Hank Marvin	Released: July 1998; Label: Spectrum Music; Formats: CD	—	—	—
The Very Best of Hank Marvin & the Shadows: The First 40 Years	Released: September 1998; Label: PolyGram TV; Formats: 2xCD, 2xMC	56	9	—
Marvin Mastertrax Volume 1	Released: 2000; Label: Handisk; Formats: CD	—	—	—
The Singles Collection: The 80's & 90's	Released: 5 March 2001; Label: Crimson; Formats: CD	—	—	—
Shadowing the Hits	Released: July 2004; Label: Recall 2cd; Formats: 2xCD	—	—	—
The Solid Gold Collection	Released: October 2005; Label: Union Square Music; Formats: 2xCD	—	—	—
The Best of Hank Marvin	Released: September 2010; Label: EMI; Formats: 3xCD	—	—	—
Guitar Solo – His Complete Solo Recordings 1982–1995	Released: 15 January 2016; Label: Edsel; Formats: 5xCD box set, digital download	—	—	—
The Collection	Released: 4 September 2015; Label: Music Club Deluxe; Formats: 2xCD, digital download	—	—	—
Throw Down a Line – A Taste of Hank Marvin	Released: 8 June 2018; Label: Own Label; Formats: 2xLP	—	—	—
Gold	Released: 28 June 2019; Label: Crimson; Formats: 3xCD, LP, digital download	9	—	5
Dance with the Guitar Man	Released: 2021; Label: Dusty Tapes; Formats: CD	—	—	—
"—" denotes releases that did not chart.

=== Video albums ===
Title	Album details
Hank Plays Live	Released: March 1997; Label: PolyGram TV; Formats: VHS

== Singles ==
Title	Year	Peak chart positions							Album
Title	Year	UK	AUS	BEL (FL)	DEN	IRE	NL	NZ	Album
"London's Not Too Far"	1968	52 (Note: Chart position is from the official UK "Breakers List".)	—	—	—	—	—	—	Non-album singles
"Goodnight Dick"	1969	52	—	—	—	—	—	—	Non-album singles
"Sacha"	1969	—	15	—	—	—	—	—	Hank Marvin
"Throw Down a Line" (with Cliff Richard)	1969	7	58	12	—	8	—	15	Non-album singles
"The Joy of Living" (with Cliff Richard)	1970	25	71	—	—	—	—	—	Non-album singles
"Break Another Dawn"	1970	—	—	—	—	—	—	—	Non-album singles
"Flamingo"	1977	—	—	—	—	—	—	—	The Hank Marvin Guitar Syndicate
"Don't Talk"	1982	49	—	—	14	—	—	—	Words and Music
"The Trouble with Me Is You"	1982	157	—	—	—	—	—	—	Words and Music
"The Hawk and the Dove"	1983	162	—	—	—	—	—	—	All Alone with Friends
"Invisible Man"	1983	—	—	—	—	—	—	—	All Alone with Friends
"Living Doll" (Cliff Richard and The Young Ones featuring Hank Marvin)	1986	1	1	1	1	1	1	1	Non-album single
"London Kid" (Jean-Michel Jarre featuring Hank Marvin)	1988	52	—	—	—	—	—	—	Révolutions
"We Are the Champions" (featuring Brian May)	1992	66	—	—	—	—	—	—	Into the Light
"Wonderful Land" (featuring Mark Knopfler)	1993	97	—	—	—	—	—	—	Heartbeat
"Nivram" (with Jean-Pierre Danel)	2011	—	—	—	—	—	—	—	All the Best!
"M Appeal" (with Jean-Pierre Danel)	2012	—	—	—	—	—	—	—	The Blues Album
"—" denotes releases that did not chart or were not released in that territory.
