= Shades of Rock =

Studio album by The Shadows
- Released: October 1970
- Recorded: March and May 1970
- Genre: Blues rock
- Length: 34:23
- Label: Columbia (EMI)
- Producer: Peter Vince

The Shadows chronology
From Hank, Bruce, Brian and John (1967)	Shades of Rock (1970)	Rockin' with Curly Leads (1973)

Professional ratings
Review scores
Source	Rating
Allmusic	2/5 stars

Shades of Rock is the eighth rock album by British instrumental (and sometimes vocal) group The Shadows, released in 1970 through Columbia (EMI).

== Track listing ==
Side one
No.	Title	Writer(s)	Length
1.	"Proud Mary"	John Fogerty	03:20
2.	"My Babe"	Willie Dixon	02:52
3.	"Lucille"	Al Collins, Richard Wayne Penniman	02:51
4.	"Johnny B. Goode"	Chuck Berry	02:54
5.	"Paperback Writer"	John Lennon, Paul McCartney	03:08
6.	"(I Can't Get No) Satisfaction"	Mick Jagger, Keith Richards	02:44
Total length:			17:49

Side two
No.	Title	Writer(s)	Length
1.	"Bony Moronie"	Larry Williams	02:22
2.	"Get Back"	Lennon, McCartney	03:06
3.	"Something"	George Harrison	02:47
4.	"River Deep – Mountain High"	Jeff Barry, Ellie Greenwich, Phil Spector	03:32
5.	"Memphis"	Berry	02:17
6.	"What'd I Say"	Ray Charles	02:30
Total length:			16:34

== Personnel ==
- Hank Marvin - Lead and rhythm guitar
- John Rostill - Bass guitar (side one, tracks 3 and 6, side two, track 1)
- Brian Bennett - Drums and percussion
- Alan Hawkshaw - Piano, organ and electric piano

Extra Musicians

- Dave Richmond - Bass guitar
- Herbie Flowers - Bass guitar
- Brian Odgers - Bass guitar
- Cover Photo by Alan Wilmoth
- Peter Vince - Producer

== Charts ==
Chart (1970)	Peak position
UK Albums Chart	30
