= From Hank, Bruce, Brian and John =

Studio album by The Shadows
- Released: 1 December 1967
- Genre: Rock
- Length: 33:05
- Label: Columbia (EMI)
- Producer: Norrie Paramor

The Shadows chronology
Jigsaw (1967)	From Hank, Bruce, Brian and John (1967)	Shades of Rock (1970)

Professional ratings
Review scores
Source	Rating
Allmusic	3.5/5 stars

From Hank, Bruce, Brian and John is the seventh rock album by British instrumental (and sometimes vocal) group The Shadows, released in 1967. It was their last album to be issued in mono and stereo.

== Track listing ==
Disc one
No.	Title	Writer(s)	Length
1.	"Snap, Crackle and How's Your Dad"	Bruce Welch, Brian Bennett	2:05
2.	"Evening Glow"	Domei Suzuki; erroneously credited to Uko Nakamura and Shin Kusakawa on sleeve.	2:04
3.	"A Thing of Beauty"	Rod Harper	2:04
4.	"Naughty Nippon Nights"	Graham Gouldman	2:05
5.	"The Wild Roses"	Somegoro Ichikawa	2:38
6.	"San Francisco" (Lead vocal by Hank Marvin)	John Phillips	2:39
7.	"The Letter" (Lead vocal by Hank Marvin)	Wayne Carson Thompson	1:58
Total length:			15:33

Disc two
No.	Title	Writer(s)	Length
1.	"The Tokaido Line"	Hank Marvin, Bruce Welch, John Rostill, Brian Bennett	2:25
2.	"Holy Cow"	Allen Toussaint	2:44
3.	"Alentejo"	Peter Vince	2:31
4.	"Last Train to Clarksville"	Tommy Boyce, Bobby Hart	2:11
5.	"Let Me Take You There" (Lead vocal by Hank Marvin)	John Rostill, Brian Bennett	2:23
6.	"The Day I Met Marie" (Lead vocal by Hank Marvin)	Hank Marvin	2:29
7.	"A Better Man Than I" (Lead vocal by Hank Marvin and Bruce Welch)	Hank Marvin	2:49
Total length:			17:32

== Personnel ==
- Hank Marvin – Lead guitar and vocals
- Bruce Welch – Rhythm guitar and vocals
- John Rostill – Bass guitar and vocals
- Brian Bennett – Drums and percussion
- Alan Hawkshaw - Organ
- Olivia Newton-John - Guest vocals on "The Day I Met Marie"
- Norrie Paramor - Producer
- Peter Vince - Engineer
