= Greatest Hits (The Shadows album) =

Greatest hits album by The Shadows
- Released: 1963
- Recorded: 1960–1962
- Genre: Rock
- Length: 40:57
- Label: Columbia (EMI)

The Shadows chronology
Out of the Shadows (1962)	Greatest Hits (1963)	Dance with The Shadows (1964)

Professional ratings
Review scores
Source	Rating
AllMusic	4.5/5 stars
New Record Mirror	4/5 stars

Greatest Hits is a 1963 compilation album by British instrumental group the Shadows. The album spent 56 weeks on the UK Albums Chart, peaking at number 2.

== Track listing ==
Side one
No.	Title	Writer(s)	Length
1.	"Apache"	Jerry Lordan	2:57
2.	"Man of Mystery"	Michael Carr	2:02
3.	"The Stranger"	Bill Crompton, Stan Jones	2:45
4.	"F.B.I"	Peter Gormley	2:24
5.	"Midnight"	Hank Marvin, Bruce Welch	2:33
6.	"The Frightened City"	Norrie Paramor	2:24
7.	"Kon-Tiki"	Michael Carr	1:57

Side two
No.	Title	Writer(s)	Length
1.	"36 24 36"	Jet Harris, Hank Marvin, Tony Meehan, Bruce Welch	1:45
2.	"The Savage"	Norrie Paramor	2:25
3.	"Peace Pipe"	Norrie Paramor	2:13
4.	"Wonderful Land"	Jerry Lordan	2:06
5.	"Stars Fell on Stockton"	Brian Bennett, Jet Harris, Hank Marvin, Tony Meehan, Bruce Welch	2:18
6.	"Guitar Tango"	Georges Liferman, Norman Maine	3:01
7.	"The Boys"	Brian Bennett, Hank Marvin, Bruce Welch	2:33
8.	"Dance On!"	Ray Adams, Elaine Murtagh, Valerie Murtagh	2:25

== Charts ==
Chart (1966)	Peak position
UK Albums Chart	2

== Release history ==
A remastered version of the album was released on CD by EMI in 2004. The remaster includes mono and stereo versions of every track, as well as a bonus track ("Quatermassters Stores"). In 2019, this album was re-released, this time by Hallmark Music & Entertainment.
