= Themes from Aladdin =

EP by The Shadows
- Released: 1965
- Genre: Rock
- Label: Columbia/EMI

The Shadows chronology
Dance with the Shadows No.2 (1964)	Themes from Aladdin (1965)	Dance with The Shadows No.3 (1965)

Themes from Aladdin and His Wonderful Lamp is an extended play 45 rpm record released in 1965 by The Shadows. It was released on Columbia Records/EMI Records as SEG 8396 in mono and reached No. 14 in the UK EP charts in March 1965. The songs on the EP are excerpts from the London Palladium pantomime Aladdin and His Wonderful Lamp.

The liner notes were written by Derek Johnson of the New Musical Express.

== Track listing ==
Side 1

- Me Oh My (Marvin, Welch, Bennett, Rostill)
- Friends (Marvin, Welch, Bennett, Rostill)

Side 2

- Genie with the Light Brown Lamp (Marvin, Welch, Bennett, Rostill)
- Little Princess (Marvin, Welch, Bennett, Rostill)

== Personnel ==
- Hank Marvin – Lead Guitar,
- Bruce Welch – Rhythm guitar
- Brian Bennett – Drums
- John Rostill – Bass guitar
