= At Their Very Best (album) =

Compilation album by The Shadows
- Released: 1989
- Recorded: 1989
- Genre: Instrumental
- Label: Polygram
- Producer: The Shadows

The Shadows chronology
Steppin' To The Shadows (1989)	At Their Very Best (1989)	Reflection (1990)

At Their Very Best is an album released by British pop group The Shadows released on 4 December 1989. The tracks were recorded in 1989.

== Musicians ==
- Hank Marvin – Lead Guitar
- Bruce Welch – Rhythm Guitar
- Brian Bennett – Drums & Percussion
- Cliff Hall – Keyboards
- Mark Griffiths – Bass guitar
- Venue – Honeyhill Studios, Radlett.
- Dick Plant – Engineer

== Track listing (LP/TC) ==
Side one

1. "Apache"
2. "Man of Mystery" (from The Edgar Wallace Mysteries)
3. "Shindig"
4. "Wonderful Land"
5. "The Rise And Fall of Flingel Bunt"
6. "Theme From The Deer Hunter (Cavatina)"
7. "The Boys" (from The Boys)
8. "The Frightened City" (from The Frightened City)
9. "Theme For Young Lovers" (from Wonderful Life)
10. "Dance On"

Side two

1. "The Savage" (from The Young Ones)
2. "F.B.I."
3. "Guitar Tango"
4. "Genie with the Light Brown Lamp"
5. "Atlantis"
6. "Foot Tapper" (from Summer Holiday)
7. "Don't Cry For Me Argentina" (from Evita)
8. "Kon-Tiki"
9. "Geronimo"
10. "The Stranger"
