= String of Hits =

Studio album by The Shadows
- Released: 1 August 1979
- Recorded: October 1978 and March, June and July 1979
- Genre: Rock
- Length: 45:21
- Label: EMI
- Producer: The Shadows

The Shadows chronology
| Tasty (1977) | String of Hits (1979) | Change of Address (1980) |

Professional ratings
Review scores
| Source | Rating |
|---|---|
| Allmusic | 2.5/5 stars |

String of Hits is the twelfth studio album by British instrumental (and sometimes vocal) rock group The Shadows, released in 1979 through EMI.

== Background ==
The album was an attempt to cover recent hit singles in the Shadows' trademark instrumental style, along with rounding up some of their recent hit singles onto an LP, including the top 5 cover of "Don't Cry for Me Argentina". The arrangements were selected by Hank Marvin.

== Reception ==
The album reached No. 1 in the British albums chart and staying on top for a total of six weeks. It was certified Platinum on 25 January 1980.

== Track listing ==
Disc one
| No. | Title | Writer(s) | Length |
|---|---|---|---|
| 1. | "Riders in the Sky" | Stan Jones | 03:58 |
| 2. | "Parisienne Walkways" | Gary Moore, Phil Lynott | 03:34 |
| 3. | "Classical Gas" | Mason Williams | 03:08 |
| 4. | "Theme from The Deer Hunter" | Stanley Myers | 03:28 |
| 5. | "Bridge over Troubled Water" | Paul Simon | 04:42 |
| 6. | "You're the One That I Want" | John Farrar | 03:05 |

Disc two
| No. | Title | Writer(s) | Length |
|---|---|---|---|
| 1. | "Heart of Glass" | Debbie Harry, Chris Stein | 03:39 |
| 2. | "Don't Cry for Me Argentina" | Andrew Lloyd Webber, Tim Rice | 03:33 |
| 3. | "Song for Duke" | Hank Marvin, Bruce Welch, Brian Bennett | 04:02 |
| 4. | "Bright Eyes" | Mike Batt | 03:47 |
| 5. | "Rodrigo's Guitar Concerto de Aranjuez (Theme from 2nd Movement)" | Joaquín Rodrigo | 03:30 |
| 6. | "Baker Street" | Gerry Rafferty | 04:55 |

== Personnel ==
- Hank Marvin - Lead guitar
- Bruce Welch - Rhythm guitar
- Brian Bennett - Drums and percussion

With

- Alan Jones - Bass guitar
- Dave Lawson - Synthesizers
- Alan Hawkshaw - Piano on "Bridge Over Troubled Water" and "You're The One That I Want"
- Peter Vince - Engineer
- Stefan Heller - Assistant Engineer
- Artwork and Design – Cream
- Steve Gray - Orchestral accompaniment on "Classical Gas", "Bridge Over Troubled Water" and "Rodrigo's Guitar Concerto De Aranjuez"
- Recorded at EMI, Abbey Road Studios, London and The Music Centre, Wembley

== Charts ==
| Chart (1979) | Peak position |
|---|---|
| UK Albums Chart | 1 |
| Dutch Album Chart | 7 |

== Certifications ==
| Region | Certification | Certified units/sales |
|---|---|---|
| Finland (Musiikkituottajat) | Gold | 39,251 |
| Netherlands (NVPI) | Gold | 50,000^{^} |
^{^} Shipments figures based on certification alone.
