= The Final Reunion =

Live album by Cliff Richard & the Shadows
- Released: 9 November 2009
- Label: 2 Entertain

The Final Reunion is a live DVD release of the Cliff Richard & the Shadows' performance at the O2 Arena in London. It was released worldwide on 9 November 2009 and was part of The Final Reunion Tour. It debuted at No. 1 on the UK music DVD chart and peaked at No. 7 on the general DVD chart. It also reached No. 1 in several European countries including Sweden, the Netherlands, and Denmark.

== Charts ==
Chart (2009)	Peak position
Belgian (Wallonia) Music DVDs Chart	7
Danish Music DVDs Chart	1
Dutch Music DVDs Chart	1
Finnish Music DVDs Chart	2
Norwegian Music DVDs Chart	4
Swedish Music DVDs Chart	1
UK Music Videos Chart	1

Chart (2010)	Peak position
Australian Music DVDs Chart	1
Belgian (Flanders) Music DVDs Chart	1
New Zealand Music DVDs Chart	1
