= Dance with The Shadows =

Dance with the Shadows

Studio album by The Shadows
- Released: May 1964
- Genre: Rock
- Length: 34:50
- Label: Columbia (EMI)
- Producer: Norrie Paramor

The Shadows chronology
Greatest Hits (1963)	Dance with the Shadows (1964)	The Sound of The Shadows (1965)

Alternative cover

Professional ratings
Review scores
Source	Rating
Allmusic	3/5 stars

Dance with The Shadows is a 1964 rock album by British instrumental (and sometimes vocal) group The Shadows. It was their third album. It reached number 2 in the album charts. The album was also released as a double-album with The Sound of The Shadows by MFP in the 1980s.

== Track listing ==
Side one
No.	Title	Writer(s)	Length
1.	"Chattanooga Choo Choo"	Mack Gordon, Harry Warren	2:27
2.	"Blue Shadows"	Brian Bennett, Brian "Licorice" Locking, Hank Marvin, Bruce Welch	2:24
3.	"Fandango"	Johnny Bradford, Frank Perkins	2:27
4.	"Tonight" (from West Side Story)	Leonard Bernstein, Stephen Sondheim	2:25
5.	"That's the Way It Goes" (Lead vocal by Hank Marvin)	Hank Marvin, Bruce Welch	1:59
6.	"Big 'B'"	Brian Bennett	3:42
7.	"In The Mood"	Joe Garland, Andy Razaf	2:20
Total length:			17:44

Side two
No.	Title	Writer(s)	Length
1.	"Lonely Bull (El Solo Toro)"	Sol Lake	2:27
2.	"Dakota"	Alan Braden	2:09
3.	"French Dressing"	Brian Bennett	2:38
4.	"The High and the Mighty"	Dimitri Tiomkin	2:34
5.	"Don't It Make You Feel Good" (Lead vocal by Hank Marvin)	Hank Marvin, Bruce Welch	2:23
6.	"Zambesi"	Nico Carstens, Anton De Waal	2:37
7.	"Temptation"	Nacio Brown, Arthur Freed	2:18
Total length:			17:06

== Personnel ==
- Hank Marvin – Lead guitar, piano and vocals
- Bruce Welch – Rhythm guitar and vocals
- John Rostill – Bass guitar
- Brian Locking – Bass guitar on "Blue Shadows", "Dakota" and "French Dressing"
- Brian Bennett – Drums and percussion
- Norrie Paramor – Producer
- Malcolm Addey – Engineer

== Charts ==
Chart (1964)	Peak position
UK Albums Chart	2
