= Rockin' with Curly Leads =

Studio album by The Shadows
- Released: November 1973
- Recorded: 19 to 24 March and 16 to 21 May 1973
- Genre: Rock
- Length: 44:43
- Label: Columbia (EMI)
- Producer: The Shadows

The Shadows chronology
Shades of Rock (1970)	Rockin' with Curly Leads (1973)	Specs Appeal (1975)

Professional ratings
Review scores
Source	Rating
AllMusic	2/5 stars

Rockin' with Curly Leads is the ninth rock album by British instrumental (and sometimes vocal) group The Shadows, released in 1973 through Columbia (EMI).

== Track listing ==
Side One
No.	Title	Writer(s)	Length
1.	"Pinball Wizard/See Me, Feel Me"	Pete Townshend	03:05
2.	"Years Away"	John Farrar	03:09
3.	"Humbucker"	Brian Bennett, Farrar, Hank Marvin, Bruce Welch	04:22
4.	"Deep Roots"	Bennett, Farrar, Marvin, Welch	03:39
5.	"Jungle Jam"	Bennett, Farrar, Marvin, Welch	04:39
6.	"Gracie"	Farrar	03:02
Total length:			21:56

Side Two
No.	Title	Writer(s)	Length
1.	"Good Vibrations"	Mike Love, Brian Wilson	04:30
2.	"Turn Around and Touch Me"	Bennett, Farrar, Marvin, Welch	02:58
3.	"Wide Mouthed Frog"	Bennett, Farrar, Marvin, Welch	04:26
4.	"Rockin' With Curly Leads"	Bennett, Farrar, Marvin, Welch	03:01
5.	"Gutbucket"	Bennett, Farrar, Marvin, Welch	04:15
6.	"Jumpin' Jack Input"	Bennett, Farrar, Marvin, Welch	03:37
Total length:			22:47

== Personnel ==
- Hank Marvin – Electric and acoustic guitars
- Bruce Welch – Electric and acoustic guitars
- John Farrar – Electric and acoustic guitars
- Brian Bennett – Drums, percussion and piano
- Alan Tarney – Bass guitar

== Charts ==
Chart (1974)	Peak position
UK Albums Chart	45
