= Anton Karas =

Austrian musician and composer (1906–1985)

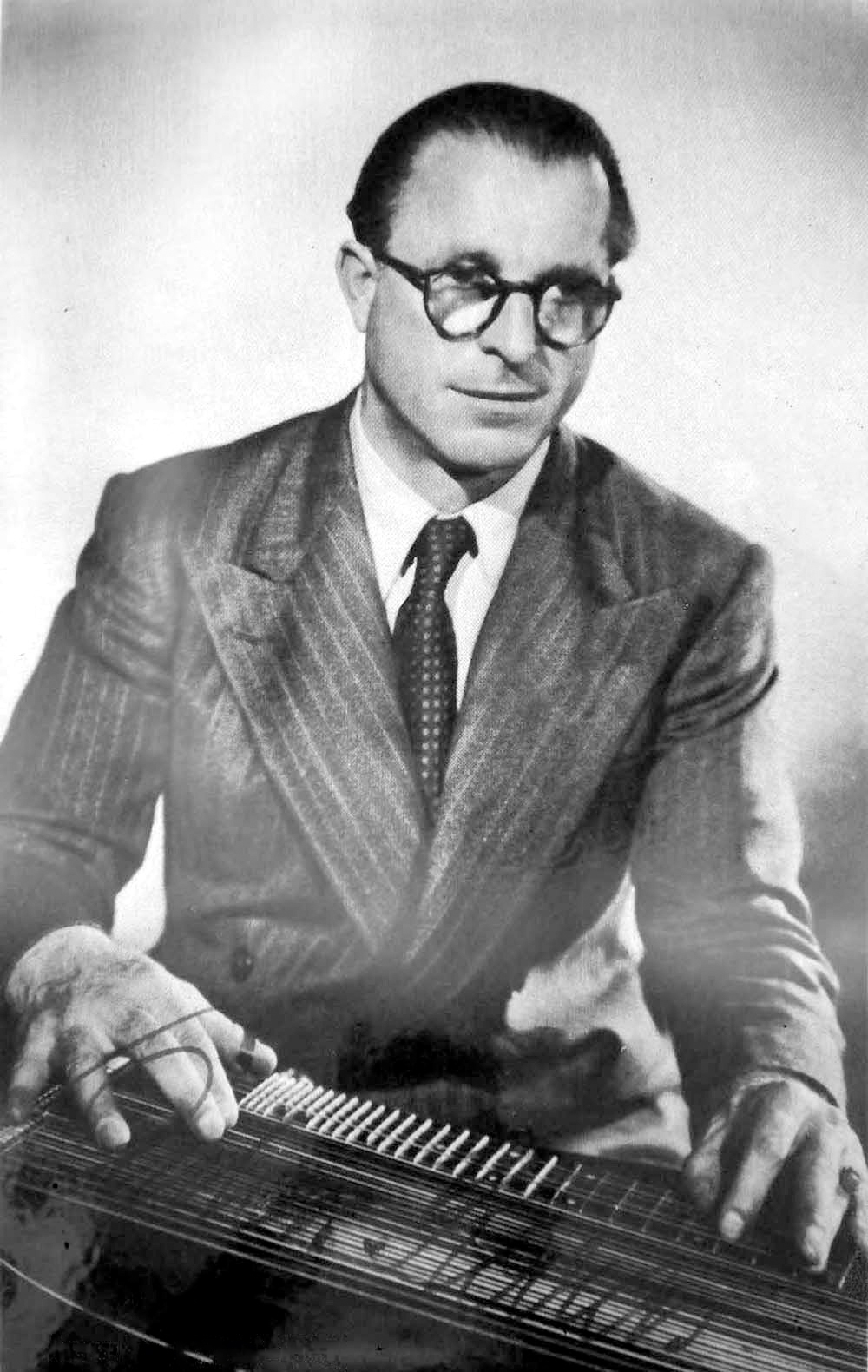
- Born: 7 July 1906; Brigittenau, Vienna, Austria-Hungary
- Died: 10 January 1985 (aged 78); Vienna, Austria
- Occupations: Musician and composer

Anton Karl Karas (7 July 1906 – 10 January 1985) was an Austrian zither player and composer, best known for his internationally famous 1948 soundtrack to Carol Reed's The Third Man. His association with the film came about as a result of a chance meeting with its director. The success of the film and the enduring popularity of its theme song changed Karas' life.

== Early life ==
Anton was born illegitimate at Marchfeldstraße 17, Brigittenau, Vienna to Theresia Streckel. He was later legitimized by her marriage to a factory worker, Karl Josef Karas. One of five children, Anton Karas was already keen on music as a child. He wanted to become a bandleader, which was impossible because of his family's financial situation. He was allowed to learn to play an instrument, as were his two brothers and two sisters. He later reported that his first zither was one he found in his grandmother's attic at the age of 12.

As ordered by his father, he became an apprentice tool and die maker at the age of 14, while taking evening courses in music at a private institution. He finished his apprenticeship in 1924, and worked in a car factory until becoming unemployed in January 1925. Having already begun to study at the University of Music and Performing Arts, Vienna in 1924, he subsequently earned a living as an entertainer in a Heuriger. He soon earned more than his father, and continued his studies until 1928.

== Career ==
He married in 1930, with the birth of his daughter following three months later. From 1939 to 1945 he was with the German Wehrmacht anti-aircraft warfare, temporarily in Russia, where he took a zither along. He lost more than one instrument from war action, but always managed to find another one.

=== The Third Man ===
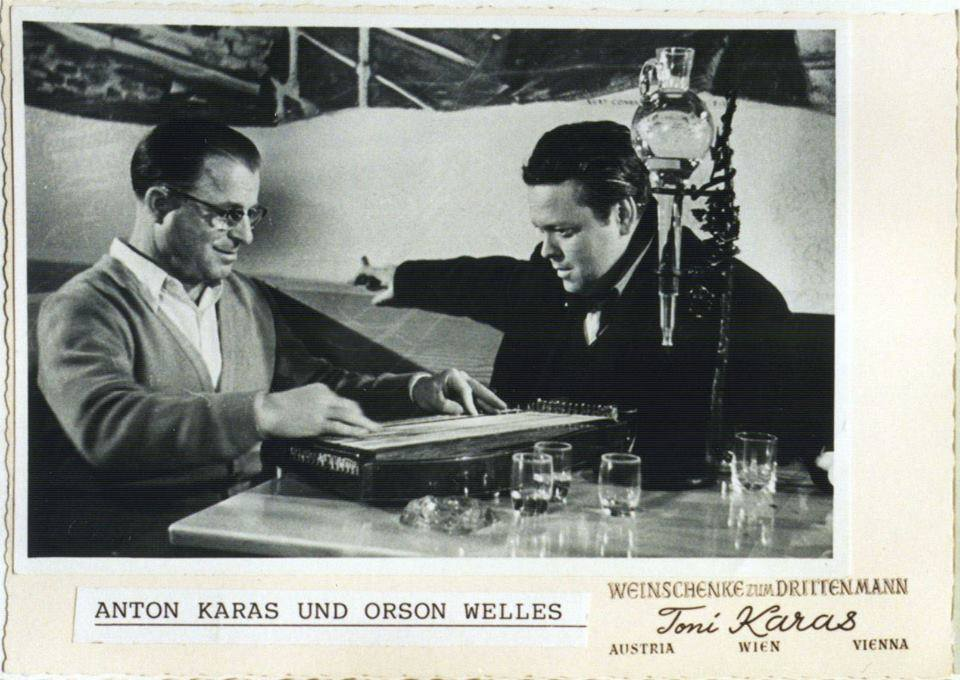
Anton Karas and Orson Welles in Karas's heuriger, Zum Dritten Mann

In the summer of 1948, director Carol Reed was preparing to shoot The Third Man in Vienna and was staying in the Hotel Sacher, along with many of the British elements of the Allied Control Commission for Austria. Robert Baty, the young son of the Director of Education, C.W. Baty, was tasked with showing the director around the city. On the second day, they stopped at a Heuriger and heard Karas playing the zither in the background. This is described in Karas' L.A. Times/Reuters obituary which states that:

Reed, desperately searching for a theme tune ... chanced on the tavern in Vienna's Grinzing wine-growing district. Struck by the simple zither melodies, Reed asked a stunned Karas if he would compose the music for the film. Karas protested, saying he had never actually written music. As Karas later told the story, the director insisted and invited Karas to England. The Austrian became homesick and asked to return. Reed told him he could; when he had written the music. Under this pressure, Karas wrote his Harry Lime theme.

The film—with the music a contributing factor—was a success, and Karas' life was changed drastically. As a result, he toured globally and performed for many celebrities, including members of the British Royal family. Princess Margaret invited him to London's Empress Club, where he played twice a week while in London. He also appeared before Queen Juliana of the Netherlands, members of the Swedish royal family, and Pope Pius XII.

By the end of 1949, half a million copies of "The Harry Lime Theme" had been sold, an unprecedented number. The success of the score caused a surge in zither sales.

In Austria, the film opened on 10 March 1950, in Vienna's Apollo Kino, and it initially offended some Viennese inhabitants, as it focused on the disgrace of the destroyed city. Vienna's newspaper critics hated the film, except for its music. When Karas returned to Austria after his first world tour in July 1950, he was welcomed by Chancellor Leopold Figl and other members of the government. Most importantly, the public liked the film. In Brigittenau, where Karas was born, people queued for tickets, which were sold out eight days in advance.

Karas disliked the glamour, and his soundtrack proved to be an enduring one-hit wonder. He later stated, "I never was a star, and never felt like one. It is because of that film that I was pushed from one place to the other ... My only desire was to be back home again." He toured again in 1951, travelling to Montreal and Las Vegas, followed by other tours, including Japan in 1962, 1969 and 1972, where he performed for Emperor Hirohito.

In 1953 Karas opened a heuriger or wine bar in Vienna he named Zum Dritten Mann. It became fashionable among cinema celebrities including Orson Welles, Gina Lollobrigida, Curd Jürgens, Hans Moser, Paul Hörbiger, Marika Rökk and Johannes Heesters, thereby becoming a tourist attraction. He was not satisfied, as he preferred to perform for locals who would understand him, his language and music. Because of this, he retired and retreated from the limelight in 1966, explaining, "I'm not a tourist guy, and what I did there had hardly anything to do with 'Vienna Heuriger'."

The first few bars of "The Third Man Theme" are engraved on his grave marker in Vienna.
