= Specs Appeal =

Studio album by The Shadows
- Released: March 1975
- Recorded: April, May, August and November 1974 and early 1975
- Studio: EMI Studios, Abbey Road and CTS Studios, Wembley
- Genre: Rock
- Length: 36:36
- Label: Columbia (EMI)
- Producer: The Shadows

The Shadows chronology
Rockin' with Curly Leads (1973)	Specs Appeal (1975)	Tasty (1977)

Professional ratings
Review scores
Source	Rating
AllMusic	3.5/5 stars
Music Week	4/4 stars

Specs Appeal is the tenth album by British instrumental (and sometimes vocal) group the Shadows, released in 1975 through Columbia (EMI). The album included all six songs that the group had performed in that year's A Song for Europe.

== Track listing ==
Disc one
No.	Title	Writer(s)	Length
1.	"God Only Knows"	Tony Asher, Brian Wilson	02:37
2.	"Cool Clear Air" (Lead vocal by John Farrar)	Guy Fletcher, Doug Flett	02:52
3.	"Rose, Rose"	Bruce Welch, John Rostill	03:15
4.	"This House Runs on Sunshine" (Lead vocal by Hank Marvin and John Farrar)	Brian Bennett, Mike Redway	02:23
5.	"Colorado Songbird"	Brian Bennett	03:27
6.	"No No Nina" (Lead vocal by Hank Marvin)	John Farrar, Peter Best	02:53
Total length:			17:27

Disc two
No.	Title	Writer(s)	Length
1.	"Honourable Puff-Puff"	Hank Marvin, Bruce Welch, Brian Bennett, John Farrar, Dave Richmond	04:11
2.	"Don't Throw It All Away" (Lead vocal by Bruce Welch)	Gary Benson, David Mindel	03:02
3.	"Spider Juice"	Hank Marvin	02:30
4.	"Let Me Be the One" (Lead vocal by Bruce Welch)	Paul Curtis	02:45
5.	"Like Strangers"	Bruce Welch, Brian Bennett	03:49
6.	"Stand Up Like a Man" (Lead vocal by John Farrar and Bruce Welch)	Ben Findon, Michael Myers	02:52
Total length:			19:09

== Personnel ==
- Hank Marvin - Electric and acoustic guitars and vocals
- Bruce Welch - Electric and acoustic guitars and vocals
- John Farrar - Electric and acoustic guitars and vocals and ARP synthesizer on "Like Strangers"
- Brian Bennett - Drums and percussion and ARP synthesizer on "Like Strangers"

With

- Dave Richmond - Bass guitar (side one, tracks 1, 3 and 5, side two, tracks 1, 3 and 5)
- Alan Tarney - Bass guitar (side one, tracks 2, 4 and 6, side two, tracks 2, 4 and 6)
- John Fiddy - Orchestral accompaniment (side one, track 2, side two, tracks 2, 4 and 6)
- Graham Todd - Keyboards on "God Only Knows"

== Charts ==
Chart (1975)	Peak position
UK Albums Chart	30
