= The Third Man Theme =

Single by Anton Karas
- B-side: "The Cafe Mozart Waltz"
- Released: 1949 (UK); February 1950 (U.S.)
- Recorded: 1949
- Genre: Instrumental
- Length: 2:06
- Label: Decca Records (UK); London Records (U.S.)
- Songwriter: Anton Karas

Anton Karas singles chronology
"The Third Man Theme" (1949)	"I'm in the Middle of a Riddle" (1950)

"The Third Man Theme" (also written "3rd Man Theme" and known as "The Harry Lime Theme") is an instrumental written and performed by Anton Karas for the soundtrack to the 1949 film The Third Man. Upon release the theme proved popular, spending eleven weeks at number one on Billboard's United States Best Sellers in Stores chart. Multiple versions have been performed and recorded, selling tens of millions of copies, and its success influenced the release strategy of later film singles.

== Background ==
The Third Man is a 1949 British film noir, directed by Carol Reed. One night after a long day of filming The Third Man on location in Vienna, Reed and cast members Joseph Cotten, Alida Valli and Orson Welles had dinner and retired to a wine cellar. In the bistro, which retained the atmosphere of the pre-war days, they heard the zither music of Anton Karas, a 40-year-old musician who was playing there just for the tips. Reed immediately realized that this was the music he wanted for his film. Karas spoke only German, which no one in Reed's party spoke, but fellow customers translated Reed's offer to the musician that he compose and perform the soundtrack for The Third Man. Karas was reluctant since it meant traveling to England, but he finally accepted. Karas wrote and recorded the 40 minutes of music heard in The Third Man over a six-week period, after the entire film was translated for him at Shepperton Studios.

The composition that became famous as "The Third Man Theme" had long been in Karas's repertoire, but he had not played it in 15 years. "When you play in a café, nobody stops to listen", Karas said. "This tune takes a lot out of your fingers. I prefer playing [Rudolf Sieczyński's] 'Wien, Wien', the sort of thing one can play all night while eating sausages at the same time." According to writer and critic Rudi Blesh, the tune is identical to the main theme of "Rags to Burn", a ragtime piano piece credited to Frank X. McFadden and published in Kansas City, Missouri in 1899.

The prominence of "The Third Man Theme" in the film developed gradually during its editing. Carol Reed initially envisioned Karas' music as being integrated with an orchestral score. The film's editor Oswald Hafenrichter ultimately prevailed in convincing Reed to weave Karas' unaccompanied theme throughout the film. So prominent is "The Third Man Theme" that the image of its performance on the vibrating strings of the zither provides the background for the film's main title sequence.

The full soundtrack album was ready for release when The Third Man came out, but because of a perceived lack of interest, labels instead focused on the catchy main theme and released it as a single. More than half a million copies of "The Third Man Theme" record were sold within weeks of the film's release. The tune was originally released in the UK in 1949, where it was known as "The Harry Lime Theme". Following its release in the US in 1950, "The Third Man Theme" spent 11 weeks at number one on Billboard's US Best Sellers in Stores chart, from April 29 to July 8. Its success led to a trend in releasing film theme music as singles. A guitar version by Guy Lombardo also sold strongly. Chet Atkins and Eddie Cochran also recorded it. Four more versions charted in the US during 1950. According to Faber & Faber, the different versions of the theme have collectively sold an estimated forty million copies.

The zither-based Anton Karas version excerpted from the film soundtrack was released by Decca in 1949 across Europe with different catalog numbers. It was a 10-inch 78 rpm single with "The Harry Lime theme" on the A side and "The Cafe Mozart Waltz" on the B side. This became the most common version heard by European listeners.

- Decca F.9235 (United Kingdom), Decca NF.9235 (Germany)
- Decca M.32760 (Netherlands)
- Decca 671 (Italy)

Karas also performed "The Third Man Theme" and other zither music for the 1951–1952 syndicated radio series The Adventures of Harry Lime, a Third Man prequel produced in London. Orson Welles reprised his role as Harry Lime. "Whenever he entered a restaurant in those years, the band would strike up Anton Karas's 'Third Man Theme'", wrote Welles biographer Joseph McBride.

== Other versions ==
- The guitar-based version performed by Guy Lombardo and His Royal Canadians was recorded December 9, 1949 and was released in the US by Decca under catalog number Decca 24839 (1950). It was a 78 rpm 10 inch single that had "The 3rd Man theme" on the A side and "The Cafe Mozart Waltz" on the B side (and subsequently released as a 45 rpm 7- inch single). This was the version most familiar to American listeners. It continued in print into the 1980s.
- Another guitar-based version was recorded by guitar master Chet Atkins recorded it in 1952. It was released on his 1955 album "Stringin' Along with Chet Atkins".
- The Swedish-born guitarist Nils Larsson recorded the tune in Stockholm on November 17, 1949, as "Banjo-Lasse" with Thorstein Sjögren's orchestra. It was released on the 78 rpm record His Master's Voice X 7567.
- Herb Alpert & The Tijuana Brass recorded a Latin-flavored go-go version of the piece arranged for brass instruments on his album !!Going Places!! (1965) for A&M Records. The song peaked at #47 on Billboard's Hot 100 in 1965.
- For their BBC special, It's The Beatles, The Beatles mixed a piece of the tune into an unintentionally instrumental version of "From Me To You" after the microphones had failed and the song had devolved into a tongue-in-cheek vamp. Six years later, they recorded another impromptu version during a jam session in 1969, but neither version has ever appeared on any of their official albums.
- The Band played it on Moondog Matinee (1973) [Capitol 93592], an album of song covers. Record World said that "the boys in The Band showcase their instrumental virtuousity on this jaunty yet mellow ditty."
- The Shadows recorded a version on their double LP Hits Right Up Your Street (1981) for Polydor Records. The song rose to No. 44 on the UK singles chart in May 1981.

== Lyrics ==
The original lyrics to the song, published under the name "The Zither Melody: song version of The Harry Lime Theme (The Third Man)", were written by Michael Carr and Jack Golden for the London Films film production (©1950, Chappell & Co., Ltd., London, Sydney & Paris).

Alternate lyrics to the song, published under the name "The Third Man Theme", were written by American author and historian Walter Lord (A Night to Remember, Incredible Victory, etc.) in 1950. Sheet music for the song was sold by Chappell & Co., and it was recorded by Don Cherry and the Victor Young Orchestra on 5 May 1950.

== Other uses ==
"The Third Man Theme" was used in a 1982 TV mail-order record collection, Aerobic Dancing [Parade LP 100A], with Sharon Barbano.

"The Third Man Theme" is informally known in Japan as the "Ebisu Beer Theme", which is still used in Ebisu beer commercials to this day. For this reason, it is also used at Ebisu Station on the Japan Rail Yamanote Line, Saikyō Line, and Shōnan–Shinjuku Line to inform passengers of departing trains.

"The Third Man Theme" was redeveloped and used as an ice cream van chime for the Toney & Sons Ice Cream business owned by the De'Pretta family of Italian descent but then based in Gateshead, Tyne and Wear from the 1960s to the 1980s.

== See also ==
- List of Billboard number-one singles of 1950

== Sources ==
- "The Foreign Film Theme – 'The Third Man Theme' 1949", Space Age Pop Music. Retrieved 25 August 2006.
- "The Third Man theme" discography, Space Age Pop Music. Retrieved 21 November 2011.
