= Guardian Angel (album) =

Studio album by The Shadows
- Released: November 1984
- Genre: Rock
- Label: Polydor
- Producer: The Shadows Stuart Coleman

The Shadows chronology
XXV (1983)	Guardian Angel (1984)	Moonlight Shadows (1986)

Professional ratings
Review scores
Source	Rating
Allmusic	2.5/5 stars

Guardian Angel is the sixteenth rock album by British instrumental (and sometimes vocal) group The Shadows, released in November 1984 through Polydor Records.

== Release ==
Guardian Angel was the group's first album to be released on LP and CD simultaneously and only the group's second CD release. It had the distinction of being the group's only 1980s album to contain mostly original material, except for "I Will Return". The album and its single, "On A Night Like This" were not promoted strongly by Polydor and the album failed in commercial terms, spending one week at number 98 in the UK album chart. Only two tracks from this album became part of The Shadows' live repertoire, during the January to March 1985 "down-under" tour in Australia and New Zealand; the two tracks being "How Do I Love Thee" and "Hammerhead".

The album was reissued on CD in December 1998 on the now defunct See for Miles Records label and added eight tracks, two of which had never been issued on CD before.

== Track listing ==
Side one
No.	Title	Writer(s)	Length
1.	"How Do I Love Thee"	Eddie Philips	3:09
2.	"Hammerhead"	Dick Plant	4:04
3.	"The Saturday Western"	Tim Renwick	3:37
4.	"Look Back on Love"	Brian Bennett	4:30
5.	"Johnny Staccato"	Hank Marvin, Bruce Welch, Bennett	3:53
6.	"I Will Return"	Philip Cordell	3:12

Side two
No.	Title	Writer(s)	Length
1.	"(I'm Gonna Be Your) Guardian Angel" (Lead vocal by Hank Marvin)	Kevin Fitzpatrick	5:52
2.	"Can't Play Your Game" (Lead vocal by Hank Marvin)	Keith Wilkinson, Anthony Wimshurst	3:54
3.	"On A Night Like This" (Lead vocal by Bruce Welch)	John David	3:50
4.	"Turning Point"	Marvin, Welch, Bennett	4:48
5.	"Our Albert"	Marvin, Bennett	2:51

== Personnel ==
- Hank Marvin - Lead Guitar & Vocals
- Bruce Welch - Rhythm Guitar & Vocals
- Brian Bennett - Drums & Percussion
- Cliff Hall - Keyboards
- Alan Jones - Bass Guitar

with

- Tony Rivers - Backing vocals (side two, tracks 1, 2 and 3)
