= The War Lord (instrumental) =

Single by The Shadows
- B-side: "I Wish I Could Shimmy Like My Sister Arthur"
- Released: 19 November 1965
- Recorded: 9 October 1965
- Studio: EMI Studios, London
- Genre: Instrumental rock
- Length: 2:16
- Label: Columbia
- Songwriter(s): Jerome Moross

The Shadows singles chronology
"Don't Make My Baby Blue" (1965)	"The War Lord" (1965)	"I Met a Girl" (1966)

"The War Lord" is an instrumental by British group the Shadows, released as a single in November 1965. It peaked at number 18 on the UK Singles Chart.

== Release and reception ==
"The War Lord" was written by American Jerome Moross and is the theme tune to Franklin J. Schaffner's 1965 film The War Lord, starring Charlton Heston and Richard Boone. It was recorded by the Shadows in October 1965, a month before the American premiere of the film, although their version was not included on Moross' soundtrack album.

The Shadows' version was released as a single with the B-side "I Wish I Could Shimmy Like My Sister Arthur", written by their bassist John Rostill. It spent nine weeks in the UK Top 40, peaking at number 18 for two weeks over the 1965–66 Christmas and New Year period.

Reviewing for New Musical Express, Derek Johnson wrote that "rasping, reverberating, low-register Hank Marvin guitar permeates this item, with pounding drums and tambourine added to accentuate the heavy beat" and that "it's a simple melody, insidious in its nagging repetition. The performance is as polished as ever, and it's the most with-it sound the boys have waxed for some time". In Record Mirror, it was described as "a persuasive sort of theme, hall-marked by Shadow professionalism. You'll soon be whistling along with this one. It's compact musicianly – but all with a beat".

"The War Lord" later appeared as the first B-side track on the EP Those Talented Shadows, released in September 1966.

== Track listing ==
7": Columbia / DB 7769

1. "The War Lord" – 2:16
2. "I Wish I Could Shimmy Like My Sister Arthur" – 2:30

== Personnel ==
- Hank Marvin – electric lead guitar
- Bruce Welch – rhythm guitar, multi-tracked electric rhythm guitar
- John Rostill – electric bass guitar
- Brian Bennett – drums, tambourine, tom-toms, sistrum

== Charts ==
Chart (1965–66)	Peak position
Australia (Kent Music Report)	30
Singapore	5
UK Singles (OCC)	18
