= The Sound of The Shadows =

Studio album by The Shadows
- Released: July 1965
- Recorded: 1965
- Genre: Rock
- Length: 39:14
- Label: EMI

The Shadows chronology
Dance with The Shadows (1964)	The Sound of The Shadows (1965)	Shadow Music (1966)

Alternative cover.
- Stereo re-release cover

Professional ratings
Review scores
Source	Rating
Allmusic	3/5 stars
Uncut	2/5 stars

The Sound of The Shadows is the fourth rock album by British instrumental (and sometimes vocal) group The Shadows, released in July 1965 through EMI Records. The album was re-released by Capitol Records of Canada in stereo (as opposed to the original mono) on 4 October 1965.

The photograph for the alternative cover was taken outside EMI House in London in 1964, by staff photographer Tony Leigh. It was originally used as the inside cover of the Cliff Richard album Aladdin and His Wonderful Lamp.

== Track listing ==
Side one
No.	Title	Writer(s)	Length
1.	"Brazil"	Ary Barroso, Bob Russell	2:23
2.	"The Lost City"	Russ Ballard	2:54
3.	"A Little Bitty Tear" (Lead vocal by Hank Marvin)	Hank Cochran	2:29
4.	"Blue Sky, Blue Sea, Blue Me"	John Rostill, Bruce Welch	5:27
5.	"Bossa Roo"	John Rostill, Bruce Welch	3:07
6.	"Five Hundred Miles" (Lead vocal by Bruce Welch, Hank Marvin & John Rostill)	Sonny West	2:40
7.	"Cotton Pickin'"	Perry Ford, Tony Hiller	2:17
Total length:			21:17

Side two
No.	Title	Writer(s)	Length
1.	"Deep Purple"	Peter DeRose, Mitchell Parish	2:21
2.	"Santa Ana"	Jerry Lordan, Petrina Lordan	2:30
3.	"The Windjammer"	John Rostill	2:45
4.	"Dean's Theme"	Hank Marvin, John Rostill	2:57
5.	"Breakthru'"	Geoffrey Taggart	2:03
6.	"Let It Be Me" (Lead vocal by Hank Marvin, Bruce Welch & John Rostill)	Gilbert Bécaud, Manny Curtis, Pierre Delanoë	2:58
7.	"National Provincial Samba"	John Rostill, Bruce Welch	2:23
Total length:			17:57

== Personnel ==
- Hank Marvin - Lead guitar and vocals
- Bruce Welch - Rhythm guitar and vocals
- John Rostill - Bass guitar and vocals
- Brian Bennett - Drums and percussion
- Norrie Paramor - Producer and orchestral accompaniment on "Blue Sky, Blue Sea, Blue Me" and "The Windjammer"

== Charts ==
Chart (1965)	Peak position
UK Albums Chart	4
