= Change of Address (The Shadows album) =

Studio album by The Shadows
- Released: September 1980
- Recorded: Late 1979, early 1980 and 11 to 15 February 1980
- Genre: Rock
- Label: Polydor
- Producer: The Shadows

The Shadows chronology
String of Hits (1979)	Change of Address (1980)	Hits Right Up Your Street (1981)

Professional ratings
Review scores
Source	Rating
Allmusic	3/5 stars

Change of Address is the thirteenth rock album by British instrumental (and sometimes vocal) group The Shadows, released in 1980 through Polydor Records.

== Track listing ==
Disc one
No.	Title	Writer(s)	Length
1.	"Mozart Forte"	Wolfgang Amadeus Mozart; arranged by Hank Marvin, Bruce Welch, Brian Bennett
2.	"Midnight Creepin'"	Marvin, Welch, Bennett
3.	"Change of Address"	Marvin, Welch, Bennett
4.	"Just the Way You Are"	Billy Joel
5.	"Indigo"	Dieter Geike, Michael Topolov
6.	"Arty's Party"	Marvin, Welch, Bennett

Disc two
No.	Title	Writer(s)	Length
1.	"Outdigo"	Marvin, Welch, Bennett
2.	"Hello Mr. W.A.M."	Wolfgang Amadeus Mozart, arranged by Giorgio Moroder
3.	"Temptation"	Nacio Herb Brown, Arthur Freed
4.	"Albatross"	Peter Green
5.	"If You Leave Me Now"	Peter Cetera
6.	"Equinoxe (Part V)"	Jean Michel Jarre

== Personnel ==
- Lead Guitar - Hank Marvin
- Rhythm Guitar - Bruce Welch
- Drums & Percussion - Brian Bennett

With

- Bass guitar - Alan Jones
- Piano, Electric Piano - Cliff Hall
- Synthesizer - Dave Lawson

Engineered by Peter Vince Recorded at Abbey Road Studios, London and Radlett

== Charts ==
Chart (1980)	Peak position
UK Albums Chart	17
Dutch Album Chart	33
