= Hits Right Up Your Street =

Studio album by The Shadows
- Released: September 1981
- Recorded: Early 1981 and May and June 1981
- Genre: Rock
- Length: 54:44
- Label: Polydor, Pickwick
- Producer: The Shadows

The Shadows chronology
Change of Address (1980)	Hits Right Up Your Street (1981)	Life in the Jungle (1982)

Hits Right Up Your Street is the fourteenth rock album by British instrumental (and sometimes vocal) group The Shadows, released in September 1981 through Polydor Records and Pickwick Records. The majority of the album is in the form of covers by popular artists at the time. Cover versions of songs by The Tornados, Ennio Morricone, Cliff Richard, John Lennon, Randy Crawford, Ray Stevens, Shakin' Stevens, ABBA, Rod Stewart, Leo Sayer, Anton Karas & B. Bumble and the Stingers

== Track listing ==
Side one
No.	Title	Writer(s)	Length
1.	"Telstar"	Joe Meek	03:05
2.	"Chi Mai"	Ennio Morricone	03:37
3.	"We Don't Talk Anymore"	Alan Tarney	04:23
4.	"Imagine/Woman"	John Lennon	03:34
5.	"Hats Off To Wally"	Hank Marvin, Bruce Welch, Brian Bennett	03:00
6.	"One Day I'll Fly Away"	Will Jennings, Joe Sample	04:13
7.	"Summer Love '59"	Marvin, Welch, Bennett	03:10
8.	"Misty"	Erroll Garner, Johnny Burke	02:57
Total length:			27:59

Side two
No.	Title	Writer(s)	Length
1.	"This Ole House"	Stuart Hamblen	03:26
2.	"The Winner Takes It All"	Benny Andersson, Björn Ulvaeus	03:52
3.	"Sailing"	Gavin Sutherland	04:49
4.	"Thing-Me-Jig"	Marvin, Welch, Bennett	02:55
5.	"More Than I Can Say"	Sonny Curtis, Jerry Allison	03:28
6.	"Cowboy Café"	Marvin, Welch, Bennett	02:48
7.	"The Third Man"	Anton Karas	03:12
8.	"Nut Rocker"	Tchaikovsky, arranged by Kim Fowley	02:15
Total length:			26:45

== Personnel ==
- Hank Marvin - lead guitar
- Bruce Welch - rhythm guitar
- Brian Bennett - drums, percussion

With

- Alan Jones - bass
- Cliff Hall - keyboards

Arranged and produced by the Shadows

== Charts ==
Chart (1981)	Peak position
UK Albums Chart	15
