= Don't Make My Baby Blue =

1963 single by Frankie Laine

Single by Frankie Laine
- B-side: "The Moment of Truth"
- Released: March 29, 1963
- Recorded: March 4, 1963
- Studio: CBS Columbia Square, Sunset Boulevard, California
- Genre: Pop
- Length: 2:09
- Label: Columbia
- Songwriters: Barry Mann; Cynthia Weil
- Producer: Terry Melcher

Frankie Laine singles chronology
"A Wedded Man" (1962)	"Don't Make My Baby Blue" (1963)	"I'm Gonna Be Strong" (1963)

"Don't Make My Baby Blue" is a song by Frankie Laine, released as a single in March 1963. It peaked at number 51 on Billboard Hot 100. It was later covered by the Shadows, who had a hit with it in the UK. Laine also recorded the song in Spanish, Italian and German.

== Release and reception ==
"Don't Make My Baby Blue" was recorded by Laine at the beginning of March 1963 at CBS Columbia Square Studios in Sunset Boulevard. It was produced by Terry Melcher and features an orchestra arranged and conducted by Jack Nitzsche. It was released as a single at the end of March with the B-side "The Moment of Truth", a song written by Laine, Nell Western and Fred Katz that appeared on his 1963 album Wanderlust.

Reviewed in Billboard, it was described as Laine's "best record in a long, long time" with "a multi-tracked contemporary sound that's bound to rocket the vet singer to hitland". In Cash Box, it was described as being Laine's "strongest bid for teen-market acceptance" and has "over-dubbed against a first-rate Nashville-styled ork-chorus backdrop".

== Track listing ==
7": Columbia / 4-42767

1. "Don't Make My Baby Blue" – 2:09
2. "The Moment of Truth" – 2:40

== Charts ==
Chart (1963)	Peak position
Australia (Kent Music Report)	76
Canada (RPM)	27
US Billboard Hot 100	51
US Adult Contemporary (Billboard)	17

== The Shadows version ==
"Don't Make My Baby Blue"
- Cover of the single released in Germany

Single by The Shadows
- B-side: "My Grandfather's Clock"
- Released: 30 July 1965
- Recorded: 1965
- Studio: Estúdios Valentim de Carvalho, Lisbon; EMI Studios, London
- Genre: Pop
- Length: 2:13
- Label: Columbia
- Songwriters: Barry Mann; Cynthia Weil
- Producer: Norrie Paramor

The Shadows singles chronology
"Stingray" (1965)	"Don't Make My Baby Blue" (1965)	"The War Lord" (1965)

In July 1965, British group the Shadows released a cover of the song as a single. It peaked at number 10 on the UK Singles Chart, becoming their last top-ten hit until "Don't Cry for Me Argentina" in 1978.

=== Release and reception ===
The basic track was recorded in May 1965 at the Estúdios Valentim de Carvalho in Lisbon; however, the vocal overdubs were recorded at EMI Studios in London, though the precise date is unknown. It was released with the B-side "My Grandfather's Clock", a standard written in the late 1800s.

Reviewed in Record Mirror, it was described as having "a solid, heavy sound", "with some atmospheric old rock style guitar work backing things up. Ultra-commercial, usual pop format, but well produced and presented. A lot better than most vocal group discs". For New Musical Express, Derek Johnson described the song as "a melodic rockaballad, with a hummable, easy-to-remember tune, it has a thumping beat, some resonant Marvin guitar work, and added piano. Extremely good of its kind, and quite unlike anything the Shads have done before".

=== Track listing ===
7": Columbia / DB 7650

1. "Don't Make My Baby Blue" – 2:13
2. "My Grandfather's Clock" – 2:41

=== Personnel ===
- Hank Marvin – electric lead guitar, lead vocal, multi-tracked second lead vocal
- Bruce Welch – acoustic rhythm guitar, harmony vocal, multi-tracked second harmony vocal
- John Rostill – electric bass guitar
- Brian Bennett – drums
- Norrie Paramor – piano

=== Charts ===
Chart (1965–66)	Peak position
Australia (Kent Music Report)	39
Netherlands (Single Top 100)	34
New Zealand (Listener)	12
UK Singles (OCC)	10

== Other versions ==
- In 1964, American musician Lonnie Mack released a cover of the song as a single, though it failed to chart.
- In 1966, the Tony Dallara band I campioni released an italian version of the song as Non farla piangere
- In 1968, Hong Kong band Teddy Robin & the Playboys covered the song on their fourth and final studio album, Memories.
- In 1970, British band The Move covered the song on their sophomore studio album, Shazam.
- In 2010, Danish singer Keld Heick covered the song on his album Time Machine.
