= Shadow Music =

Studio album by The Shadows
- Released: May 1966
- Recorded: 1966
- Genre: Rock
- Length: 34:08
- Label: EMI
- Producer: Norrie Paramor, Jo Brooks, Nigel Reeve

The Shadows chronology
| The Sound of The Shadows (1965) | Shadow Music (1966) | Jigsaw (1967) |

Professional ratings
Review scores
| Source | Rating |
|---|---|
| Allmusic | 2/5 stars |
| Record Mirror | 4/5 stars |

Shadow Music is the fifth rock album by British instrumental (and sometimes vocal) group The Shadows, released in 1966 through EMI Records.

== Track listing ==
Side one
| No. | Title | Writer(s) | {{{extra_column}}} | Length |
|---|---|---|---|---|
| 1. | "I Only Want to Be with You" (Lead vocal by Hank Marvin) | Hank Marvin, Bruce Welch, John Rostill, Brian Bennett | (from Babes in the Wood) | 02:41 |
| 2. | "Fourth Street" | Brian Bennett | | 02:26 |
| 3. | "The Magic Doll" | Hank Marvin, Bruce Welch, John Rostill, Brian Bennett | (From Babes in the Wood) | 02:03 |
| 4. | "Stay Around" (Lead vocal by Hank Marvin and Bruce Welch) | Chris Arnold, David Martin, Geoff Morrow | | 02:31 |
| 5. | "Maid Marion's Theme" | Hank Marvin, Bruce Welch, John Rostill, Brian Bennett | (from Babes in the Wood) | 02:28 |
| 6. | "Benno-San" | Brian Bennett | | 02:24 |
| 7. | "Don't Stop Now" | Brian Bennett | | 02:29 |
| Total length: | | | | 17:02 |

Side two
| No. | Title | Writer(s) | {{{extra_column}}} | Length |
|---|---|---|---|---|
| 1. | "In the Past" (Lead vocal by Hank Marvin) | Maurice Cahill | | 02:07 |
| 2. | "Fly Me to the Moon" | Bart Howard | | 02:17 |
| 3. | "Now That You're Gone" | Roy Whitworth, Guy Fletcher as Kit Hill, Tony Meehan | | 02:34 |
| 4. | "One Way to Love" (Lead vocal by Bruce Welch & Hank Marvin) | Chris Arnold, David Martin, Geoff Morrow | Franz Liszt | 02:21 |
| 5. | "Razzmataz" | Hank Marvin, John Rostill, Brian Bennett | | 02:49 |
| 6. | "A Sigh" | Franz Liszt | (Un Sospero) | 02:28 |
| 7. | "March to Drina" | Stanislav Binički, Lisbeth Stahl | | 02:30 |
| Total length: | | | | 17:06 |

== Personnel ==
- Hank Marvin - lead guitar
- Bruce Welch - vocals, rhythm guitar
- Brian Bennett - drums, percussion, piano
- John Rostill - vocals, bass
- Norrie Paramor - Producer; piano and orchestral accompaniment on "A Sigh (Un Sospiro)"
- Dave Steen - photography

== Charts ==
| Chart (1996) | Peak position |
|---|---|
| UK Albums Chart | 5 |
