= Tasty (The Shadows album) =

Studio album by The Shadows
- Released: August 1977
- Recorded: April, May and August 1974 and March and April 1977
- Genre: Rock
- Length: 40:07
- Label: Columbia (EMI)
- Producer: The Shadows

The Shadows chronology
Specs Appeal (1975)	Tasty (1977)	String of Hits (1979)

Professional ratings
Review scores
Source	Rating
AllMusic	3/5 stars

Tasty is the eleventh rock album by British instrumental (and sometimes vocal) group The Shadows, released in 1977 through Columbia (EMI).

== Track listing ==
Side one
No.	Title	Writer(s)	Length
1.	"Cricket Bat Boogie"	Brian Bennett, Hank Marvin, Bruce Welch	02:56
2.	"Return to the Alamo" (Orchestra arranged and conducted by Norrie Paramor)	Bennett, Marvin, Welch	04:04
3.	"Goodbye Yellow Brick Road"	Elton John, Bernie Taupin	03:08
4.	"Another Night"	Bennett, Marvin, Alan Tarney, Welch	03:25
5.	"Honky Tonk Women"	Mick Jagger, Keith Richards	02:57
6.	"Montezuma's Revenge"	Bennett, Marvin, Welch	04:05
Total length:			20:35

Side two
No.	Title	Writer(s)	Length
1.	"Walk, Don't Run"	Johnny Smith	02:51
2.	"Superstar"	Bonnie Bramlett, Leon Russell	04:12
3.	"Bermuda Triangle"	Bennett, Marvin, Welch	05:14
4.	"The Most Beautiful Girl"	Rory Bourke, Billy Sherrill, Norro Wilson	02:45
5.	"Creole Nights"	Bennett, Marvin, Welch	04:30
Total length:			19:32

== Personnel ==
- Hank Marvin – Electric and acoustic guitars
- Bruce Welch – Electric and acoustic guitars
- John Farrar – Electric and acoustic guitars (side one, tracks 3 and 5, side two tracks 2 and 4)
- Brian Bennett – Drums, percussion and piano

With

- Dave Richmond – Bass guitar (side one, tracks 3 and 5, side two tracks 2 and 4)
- Alan Tarney – Bass guitar (side one, tracks 1, 2, 4 and 6, side two tracks 1, 3 and 5)
- Norrie Paramor – Orchestral accompaniment on "Return to the Alamo"
- Tony Clark and Dick Plant – Engineers
- Recorded at – Abbey Road Studios, London / Music Centre, Wembley
- Back Cover Photograph – Gered Mankowitz
- Design and Artwork – Cream
