= Out of the Shadows (The Shadows album) =

Studio album by The Shadows
- Released: October 1962
- Recorded: 26 January to 18 June 1962
- Studio: EMI Abbey Road
- Genre: Rock
- Length: 35:43
- Label: Columbia (EMI)
- Producer: Norrie Paramor

The Shadows chronology
| The Shadows (1961) | Out of the Shadows (1962) | Greatest Hits (1963) |

Professional ratings
Review scores
| Source | Rating |
|---|---|
| New Record Mirror | 5/5 stars |

Out of the Shadows is a 1962 rock album by British group The Shadows. It was their second album.

== Track listing ==
Side one
| No. | Title | Writer(s) | Length |
|---|---|---|---|
| 1. | "The Rumble" | Ike Isaacs | 1:59 |
| 2. | "The Bandit" (Lead vocal by Bruce Welch) | Michael Carr, Alfredo Ricardo Do Nascimento, John Turner | 2:44 |
| 3. | "Cosy" | Mort Garson, Earl Schuman | 3:15 |
| 4. | "1861" | Brian Bennett, Bruce Welch, Hank Marvin | 2:26 |
| 5. | "Perfidia" | Alberto Dominguez | 2:15 |
| 6. | "Little "B"" | Brian Bennett | 5:06 |
| Total length: | | | 17:45 |

Side two
| No. | Title | Writer(s) | Length |
|---|---|---|---|
| 1. | "Bo Diddley" (Lead vocals by Bruce Welch) | Ellas McDaniel | 2:08 |
| 2. | "South of the Border" | Michael Carr, Jimmy Kennedy | 3:19 |
| 3. | "Spring Is Nearly Here" | Brian Bennett, Bruce Welch | 3:06 |
| 4. | "Are They All Like You?" (Lead vocal by Hank Marvin) | Tim Gale | 2:16 |
| 5. | "Tales of a Raggy Tramline" | Brian Bennett, Jet Harris | 2:22 |
| 6. | "Some Are Lonely" | Cliff Richard | 2:25 |
| 7. | "Kinda Cool" | Hank Marvin, Bruce Welch | 2:22 |
| Total length: | | | 17:58 |

== Charts ==
| Chart (1962–63) | Peak position |
|---|---|
| UK Albums (OCC) | 1 |

== Personnel ==
- Hank Marvin – lead guitar, piano and vocals
- Bruce Welch – rhythm guitar and vocals
- Jet Harris – bass guitar and vocals
- Brian "Licorice" Locking – bass guitar and harmonica
- Brian Bennett – drums and percussion
- Norrie Paramor – producer and orchestral accompaniment on "Spring Is Nearly Here"
- Malcolm Addey – engineer

== Instruments ==
- Lead guitar – Fender Stratocaster (Red Fiesta), Gretsch Country Gentleman, Gibson J200.
- Rhythm guitar – Fender Stratocaster (Red Fiesta), Gretsch 6120, GibsonJ65.
- Bass guitar – Fender Precision Bass (4 string).
- Drums – Premier, 20 inch Kick 14x8 and 14x14 toms. Delivered by Premier the day Little B was recorded.
- Amplifier – Vox AC30 x 3.
- Piano – from EMI Abbey Road studios.

== Recording ==
- Venue – Abbey Road studios
- EMI studio – Studio 2
- Dates: 19 December 1961 to 18 June 1962.
- Sleeve notes by Norrie Paramor.

== Formats ==
Vinyl

- 1962: 1st - (Stereo) Light Green, and (Mono)Dark Green Columbia label
- 1963: 2nd - (Stereo) Blue/Black Green Columbia label
- 1970: 3rd - (Stereo) Black/Silver EMI label(deleted soon after release)

Tape

- 1961: Reel to reel tape.
- 1973: Cassette and 8 Track cartridge 2fer ("The Shadows As Was!"): The Shadows/Out of the Shadows. EMI Double Executive Series label.

CD

- 1991: Normal. 2fer(2-4-1) CD: The Shadows/Out of the Shadows. Jewel case.
- 1997: Remastered. 2fer(2-4-1) CD: (Mono and Stereo albums). Jewel case.

== Notes ==
=== Recording ===
Recorded on all analogue equipment in real time with each track recorded on a one track per day basis with no overdubs or edits on a 2 track recording machine within Studio 2. Rather than a stereo mix being mixed down into a mono version both stereo and mono mixes were recorded separately within the same session on the same day. Mistakes made during the recording sessions resulted in immediate retakes thus multiple versions of all tracks exist in EMI's tape vaults.

All the tracks were recorded in several sessions over a 6-month period, in 8 session-days, during which other singles (e.g. Guitar Tango, All Day, What a Lovely Tune, Groanin' (unissued), Les Girls (Cliff LP), Round and Round (Cliff LP)); EPs such as The Boys (EP) - 4 tracks) were intermediately recorded as well.

1. Spring Is Nearly Here (recording-date-no.1a=26/1/62)
2. The Bandit (recording-date-no.1b=26/1/62)
3. Cosy (recording-date-no.2=5/4/62)
4. Perfidia (recording-date-no.3a=12/4/62)
5. South of the Border (recording-date-no.3b=12/4/62)
6. Little B (recording-date-no.4a=22/5/62)
7. The Bandit (recording-date-no.4b=22/5/62)
8. Are They All Like You (recording-date-no.5=28/5/62)
9. Bo Diddley (recording-date-no.6a=31/5/62)
10. The Rumble (recording-date-no.6b=31/5/62)
11. Tales of a Raggy Tramline (recording-date-no.7=19/12/61)
12. 1861 (recording-date-no.8a=4/6/62)
13. Kinda Cool (recording-date-no.8b=4/6/62)

This was the first Shadows album to feature Brian Licorice Locking, who replaced Jet Harris midway through the album's creation. The album is also the first album for Brian Bennett.

=== Style ===
The British public in 1961-62 anticipated an all instrumental second album but the Shadows and Paramor wanted to produce an album showcasing their numerous diverse talents instead. The album nevertheless features 6 (out of 13) all new original compositions written by all members of the Shadows in various permutations. By contrast, the second album of rival instrumental rock band The Ventures was an all instrumental one. The album is also much slower and smoother than the previous album.

=== Release and reception ===
Professional ratings
Review scores
| Source | Rating |
|---|---|
| Allmusic | 3/5 stars |

The album reached the no. 1 slot in the UK album charts in 1962. No singles were released from it, though 2 EPs were: "Out of the Shadows" and "Out of the Shadows no.2" both in mono and stereo.

Only track Little B has been used to promote this album when on tour in 1962 and has been used as first choice Shadows drum solo for live concerts from 1962 to 2004.

== Bibliography ==
Books

- 1. That Sound (From Move It on, the story of the magic sound of The Shadows), by R.Pistolesi, M.Addey & M.Mazzini. Publ: Vanni Lisanti. June 2000. No ISBN.
