= XXV (The Shadows album) =

Studio album by The Shadows
- Released: October 1983
- Recorded: May, June and August 1983
- Genre: Pop
- Length: 46:07
- Label: Polydor
- Producer: Bruce Welch

The Shadows chronology
Life in the Jungle (1982)	XXV (1983)	Guardian Angel (1984)

Professional ratings
Review scores
Source	Rating
Allmusic	2.5/5 stars

XXV is the fifteenth album released by British pop group The Shadows. It was released in 1983 on Polydor Records. It includes instrumental cover versions of songs by Toto, Mark Knopfler, Joe Cocker & Jennifer Warnes, Dusty Springfield, Jet Harris & Tony Meehan, Elaine Paige, Juice Newton and Procol Harum. XXV carries the distinction of being one of very few Shadows albums to feature some vocal tracks, "The Modern Way" and "Liverpool Days" (both sung by Hank Marvin).

== Track listing ==
No.	Title	Writer(s)	Length
1.	"Africa"	David Paich, Jeff Porcaro
2.	"Going Home" (from Local Hero)	Mark Knopfler
3.	"Up Where We Belong" (from An Officer and A Gentleman)	Will Jennings, Buffy Sainte-Marie, Jack Nitzsche
4.	"You Don't Have to Say You Love Me"	Pino Donaggio, Vicki Wickham, Simon Napier-Bell
5.	"The Modern Way" (Lead vocal by Hank Marvin)	Harry Bogdanovs
6.	"Diamonds"	Jerry Lordan
7.	"Time Is Tight"	Booker T. Jones
8.	"Memory" (from Cats)	Andrew Lloyd Webber, T.S. Eliot, Trevor Nunn
9.	"Liverpool Days" (Lead vocal by Hank Marvin)	Tony Catchpole, Ron Roker, Winston Sela
10.	"Queen of Hearts"	Hank DeVito
11.	"A Whiter Shade of Pale"	Keith Reid, Gary Brooker

== Charts ==
Chart (1984)	Peak position
Australia (Kent Music Report)	38

== Personnel ==
- Hank Marvin — Guitar & Lead Vocals
- Bruce Welch — Guitar & Backing Vocals
- Brian Bennett — Drums & Percussion
- Alan Jones — Bass Guitar
- Cliff Hall — Keyboards (except tracks 5, 9 and 11)

=== Additional musicians ===
- Harry Bogdanovs (track 5)
- Tony Catchpole (track 9)
- Alan Hawkshaw (track 11)
- Tony Rivers — Backing vocals (track 9)

=== Recorded at ===
- Honeyhill Studios
- Nivram Studios
- Herts by Dick Plant
