= Life in the Jungle (Shadows album) =

Studio album by The Shadows
- Released: September 1982
- Studio: Honeyhill & Nivram Studios
- Genre: Instrumental rock
- Label: Polydor
- Producer: The Shadows

The Shadows chronology
Hits Right Up Your Street (1981)	Life in the Jungle (1982)	XXV (1983)

Life in the Jungle is a studio album by the Shadows released in 1982. It was packaged with the bonus album Live at Abbey Road (also released for the first time in this package). The album package reached number 24 on the UK Album Charts.

== Track listing ==
Side A
No.	Title	Writer(s)	Length
1.	"Life In The Jungle"	Welch, Marvin, Bennett
2.	"High Noon"	Tiomkine, Washington
3.	"The Theme From Missing"	Vangelis
4.	"Treat Me Nice (Lead Vocal by Hank Marvin)"	Leiber Stoller
5.	"Cat 'N' Mouse"	Welch, Marvin, Bennett
6.	"Chariots of Fire"	Vangelis

Side B
No.	Title	Writer(s)	Length
7.	"No Dancing"	Welch, Marvin, Bennett
8.	"Riders Of The Range"	Martin Jenner
9.	"The Old Romantics"	Welch, Marvin, Bennett
10.	"You Rescue Me (Lead Vocal by Hank Marvin and Bruce Welch)"	Welch, Marvin, B. Bennett, W. Bennett
11.	"Lili Marlene"	Schultze, Leip
12.	"Raunchy"	Manker, Justis

Bonus Tracks (CD Only)
No.	Title	Writer(s)	Length
13.	"Spot The Ball"	Marvin, Welch, Bennett
14.	"The Shady Lady"	Marvin, Welch, Bennett

== Personnel ==
The Shadows are:

- Hank Marvin - Guitars & Vocals
- Bruce Welch - Guitars & Vocals
- Brian Bennett - Drums

With

- Alan Jones - Bass
- Cliff Hall - Keyboards

Recorded by Dick Plant at Honeyhill Studios & Nivram Studios

All recordings: 1982 Roll Over Records Ltd
