= Peter Vince =

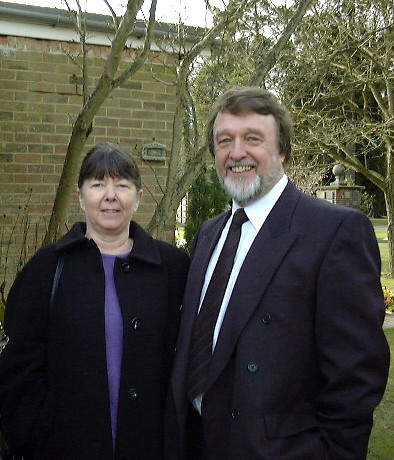
- Peter Vince and his wife Wendy, July 1998

Background information
- Born: Peter Robert Vince; July 1942; Fulham, London, England
- Died: 21 July 2020
- Occupation: Sound engineer
- Years active: 1962–1997
- Label: EMI

Peter Vince (born Peter Robert Vince) was an English sound engineer, producer and operations manager at Abbey Road Studios.

== Biography ==
Vince was born in Fulham, London in July 1942 and was educated at Munster School and St Clement Danes Grammar School.

== Career ==
In April 1962 Vince became an engineer at Abbey Road Studios, then known as EMI Studios. During his career he also achieved the role of producer and author of the book, Abbey Road: The Story of the World's Most Famous Recording Studios, which he researched and wrote with colleagues Allan Rouse and Brian Southall. As an engineer he worked with a wide variety of artists including The Seekers, Olivia Newton-John, Cliff Richard & The Shadows, The Beatles, The Hollies, The Zombies, The Spinners, Benny Hill, Maria Callas, Beverly Sills, Nino Rota and Joe Loss. He was also responsible for a number of London cast musical recordings including The Good Companions, Singin' in the Rain, The Hunting of the Snark, Destry Rides Again, Goodbye, Mr. Chips and Man of La Mancha, which received a nomination for a Grammy Award in 1969 as the Best Engineered Recording.

In 1966, Vince was one of the first people to use "direct injection" for recording electronic bass guitars, to match the output of the guitars to the other instruments.

In the early 80's, along with fellow engineers Mike Gray and Peter Mew, Vince was responsible for setting up EMI's first ever CD department.

Peter took early retirement from EMI in 1997, after 35 years service, but continued to work as a freelance engineer. This included location recordings with organist Phil Kelsall in Blackpool, and the Royal Edinburgh Military Tattoo.
