= The Shadows =

English instrumental rock group

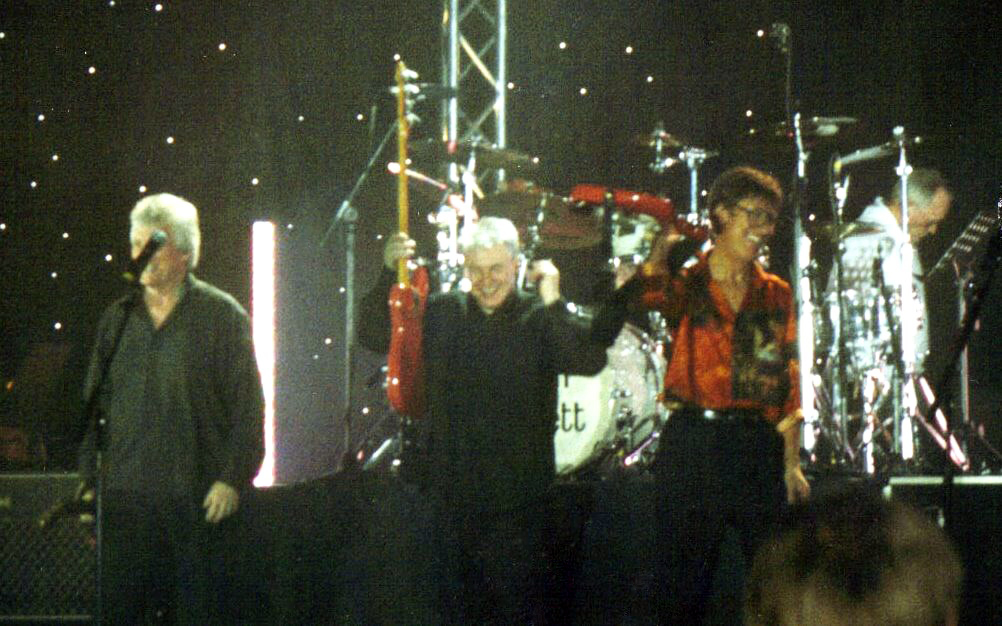
- The Shadows performing in Denmark in 2007; front left to right: Bruce Welch, Mark Griffiths and Hank Marvin; back: Brian Bennett.

Background information
- Origin: London, England
- Genres: Rock and roll; instrumental rock; surf rock; country
- Years active: 1958–1968, 1969–1970, 1973–1990, 2004–2005, 2008–2010, 2015 (one-off reunion: 2020)
- Labels: Columbia (EMI); Polydor; Universal
- Spinoffs: Marvin, Welch & Farrar
- Past members: Terry Smart; Ian Samwell; Norman Mitham; Ken Pavey; Frank Clarke; Ernie Shear; Hank Marvin; Bruce Welch; Jet Harris; Tony Meehan; Brian Bennett; Brian Locking; John Rostill; Alan Hawkshaw; John Farrar; Alan Tarney; Alan Jones; Cliff Hall; Mark Griffiths; Warren Bennett

The Shadows, originally known as the Drifters until 1959, were an English instrumental rock group formed in 1958. Initially a backing band for singer Cliff Richard, they began scoring hits in their own right when their single "Apache" reached No. 1 in the UK in 1960. They remained Richard's backing band until 1968, and joined him for several reunion tours in subsequent years. The Shadows dominated the British popular music charts in the pre-Beatles era from the late 1950s to the early 1960s, achieving 69 UK chart singles from the 1950s to the 2000s, 35 as the Shadows and 34 as Cliff Richard and the Shadows, ranging from pop, rock, surf rock and ballads with a jazz influence. The group, who were in the forefront of the UK beat-group boom, were the first backing band to also achieve commercial success in their own right.

The first settled line-up comprised Hank Marvin (lead guitar), Bruce Welch (rhythm guitar), Jet Harris (bass) and Tony Meehan (drums). Brian Bennett replaced Meehan in 1961, while Harris left in 1962, from which time the group had various bassists. As pioneers of the four-member instrumental format (lead guitar, rhythm guitar, bass and drums), the Shadows built their signature sound on Fender guitars and Vox amplifiers, but around 1964, they replaced their Fenders with Burns guitars, with Bruce Welch citing tuning issues as the main reason.

== The Shadows hits ==
The Shadows' number-one hits include "Apache", "Kon-Tiki", "Wonderful Land", "Foot Tapper" and "Dance On!". Although these and most of their best-remembered hits were instrumentals, the group also recorded occasional vocal numbers, and hit the UK top ten with the group-sung "Don't Make My Baby Blue" in 1965. Four other vocal songs by the Shadows also made the UK charts. They disbanded in 1968, but reunited in the 1970s for further commercial success.

Up to 2007 The Shadows were the fifth-most successful act on the UK Singles Chart, behind Elvis Presley, the Beatles, Cliff Richard and Madonna. The Shadows and Cliff Richard & the Shadows each have had four No. 1–selling EPs.

== Career ==
=== 1950s ===
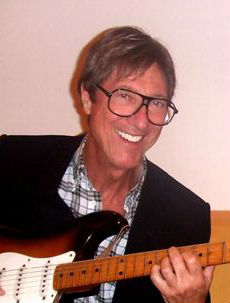
Hank Marvin, lead guitarist of the Shadows

The Shadows formed as a backing band for singer Harry Webb, soon to change his name to Cliff Richard, under the name The Drifters. The original members were Terry Smart on drums, Ian Samwell on lead guitar, and Norman Mitham and Ken Pavey both on rhythm guitar. They had no bass player.

Samwell wrote their debut single, "Move It". At the insistence of the group's producer and manager Norrie Paramor, in order to ensure a strong sound, two session players, rhythm guitarist Ernie Shear and bassist Frank Clark, played on the "Move It"/"Schoolboy Crush" single in place of Mitham and Pavey. Initially Paramor wanted to record using only studio musicians, but after persuasion he allowed Smart and Samwell to play as well. In his memoirs, Welch regrets that he and Marvin were not able to be at the start of making history with "Move It".

Cliff Richard and the Drifters signed for Jack Good's Oh Boy! television series. Paramor of EMI signed Richard, and asked Johnny Foster to recruit a better lead guitarist to replace Samwell. Foster went to Soho's 2i's coffee bar, known for musical talent performing there, particularly in skiffle, in search of guitarist Tony Sheridan. Sheridan was not there but Foster's attention was caught by Hank Marvin, who played guitar well and wore Buddy Holly-style glasses.

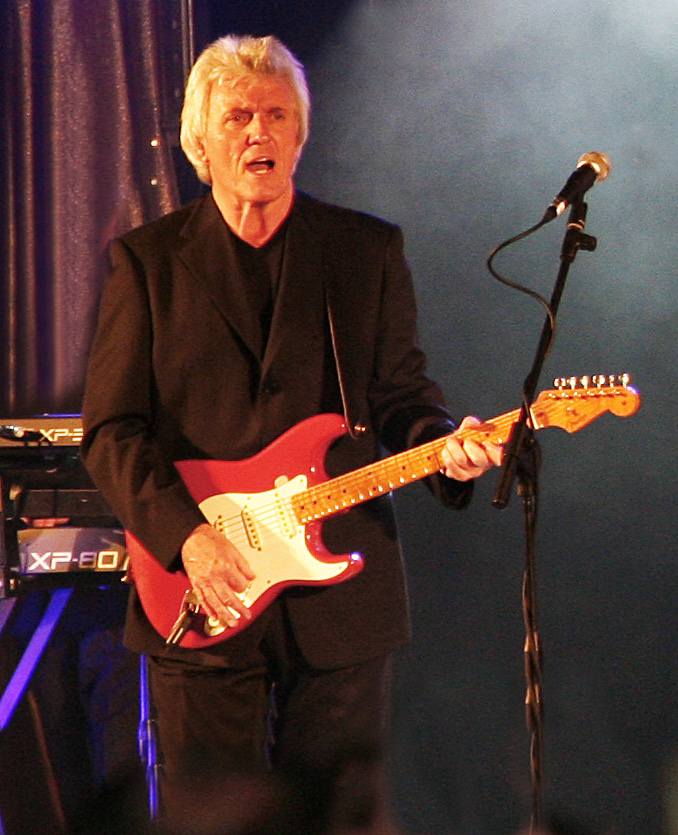
Bruce Welch, rhythm guitarist of the Shadows

By 1959, rhythm guitarist Bruce Welch, bassist Jet Harris and drummer Tony Meehan had replaced Shear, Clark and Smart, respectively. Later that year, the owner of the United States vocal group The Drifters threatened legal action over naming rights after the release and immediate withdrawal of "Feelin Fine" in the US. The second single, "Jet Black", was released in the States under the name of The Four Jets to avoid further legal aggravation, but a new band name was urgently needed. The name "The Shadows" was thought up by Harris (unaware of Bobby Vee's backing group) while he and Marvin were at the Six Bells pub in Ruislip in July 1959.

From The Story of the Shadows:

With a combination of the American situation, Cliff Richard's first number 1 hit, the runaway success "Living Doll" had by now sold over a million copies in Britain alone and after a bit of nudging from Norrie Paramor, they set about finding a permanent name, which arrived out of the blue one summer's day in July 1959 (maybe the 19th). When Hank Marvin and Jet Harris took off on their scooters up to the Six Bells pub at Ruislip, Jet hit upon a name straight away. 'What about the Shadows?' The lad was a genius! So we became the Shadows for the first time on Cliff's sixth single "Travellin' Light".

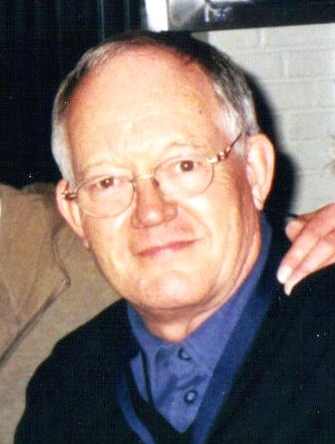
Brian Bennett, the band's long time drummer

=== 1960s ===
The Shadows were also becoming a popular band in their own right and in 1960, "Apache", an instrumental by Jerry Lordan, topped the UK charts for five weeks. Further hits followed, including the number ones "Kon Tiki" and "Wonderful Land", another Lordan composition with orchestral backing and even for eight weeks at number 1. The Shadows played on further hits as Richard's band.

In October 1961, Meehan left to be a music producer at Decca Records. He was replaced by Brian Bennett. In April 1962, Harris was replaced by Brian "Licorice" Locking. Bennett and Locking were friends from the 2I's who had been in Marty Wilde's backing group, the Wildcats, who recorded instrumentals as the Krew Kats. This Shadows line-up released seven hit singles, two of which, "Dance On!" and "Foot Tapper", topped the charts. In October 1963, Locking left to spend more time as a Jehovah's Witness.

Meanwhile, Harris and Meehan teamed up at Decca as an eponymous duo to record another Lordan instrumental, "Diamonds". It rose to UK no. 1 in January 1963. Two further hits, "Scarlett O'Hara" (also by Lordan) and "Applejack", followed in the same year. On the Lordan tunes, Harris played lead using a six-stringed Fender Bass VI. During 1963, the two ex-Shadows were competing in the charts with their former bandmates. Jet Harris acquired a Burns guitar, a Barracuda bass.

The Shadows, meanwhile, had issued a run of 13 consecutive top 10 UK hits from 1960 through 1963. The Shadows had met John Rostill on tour with other bands and had been impressed by his playing, and so in autumn 1963 they invited him to join as Locking's replacement. This final and longest-lasting line-up was the most innovative as they tried different guitars and developed a wider range of styles and higher musicianship. They produced albums but the chart positions of singles began to ease. The line-up still had ten hits, the first and most successful of which was "The Rise and Fall of Flingel Bunt". Beginning in 1965, the group also started issuing vocal numbers as singles, usually alternating a vocal A-side with an instrumental A-side. The vocal songs "Mary Anne", "Don't Make My Baby Blue", and "I Met A Girl" all made the UK top 30, and "The Dreams I Dream" peaked at number 42. Instrumental numbers also continued to chart, including "Genie with the Light Brown Lamp", "Stingray", "The War Lord", "A Place in the Sun" and "Maroc 7", all top 30 hits.

=== Films with Cliff Richard ===
During the 1960s, the group appeared with Cliff Richard in the films The Young Ones, Summer Holiday, Wonderful Life, and Finders Keepers. They also appeared as marionettes in the Gerry Anderson film Thunderbirds Are GO, and starred in a short B-film called Rhythm 'n Greens which became the basis of a music book and an EP.

=== Stage pantomimes ===
They appeared in pantomime: Aladdin and his Wonderful Lamp in 1964 at the London Palladium with Arthur Askey as Widow Twankey, Richard as Aladdin, and the Shadows as Wishee, Washee, Noshee and Poshee; Cinderella at the Palladium in 1966 featured Richard as Buttons and the Shadows as the Broker's Men. Their film and stage roles allowed the group to develop as songwriters. They wrote only a few songs for the earliest film, 1961's The Young Ones, but, by Finders Keepers in 1966, almost the entire soundtrack was credited to Marvin-Welch-Bennett-Rostill. In 1967, the Shadows used Olivia Newton-John on the track "The Day I Met Marie" on their album From Hank Bruce Brian and John.

In October 1968, Marvin and Welch decided to disband the group following a concert at the London Palladium. In the event, only Welch left, but the Shadows had disbanded by the end of the year.

=== 1970s ===
The group began 1970 by appearing on the BBC's review of the '60s music scene, Pop Go The Sixties, performing "Apache" and backing Richard on "Bachelor Boy", broadcast across Europe and BBC1, on 31 December 1969. This was followed by Marvin and a reconstituted Shadows becoming resident guests on Richard's debut TV series for the BBC, It's Cliff Richard!

In July 1970, Australian musician John Farrar moved to Britain and was invited to become a member of Marvin, Welch & Farrar. By that time, Olivia Newton-John and Welch had become engaged, and Farrar and Welch became two of her songwriters and producers.

While The Shadows were famous for their instrumental work, Marvin, Welch & Farrar were a trio, vocal harmony group. They were favourably compared to USA folk close harmony group Crosby, Stills, Nash and Young (a.k.a. CSNY) and The Hollies.

Their second album, Second Opinion (1971), produced by Peter Vince, was voted one of the best ever sounding albums recorded at Abbey Road studios by EMI Records' sound engineers in a private poll during the 1970s. The band lasted until 1973.

In 1975, a reconstituted Shadows were chosen by BBC Head of Light Entertainment Bill Cotton to perform the Song for Europe in the 1975 Eurovision Song Contest. The Shadows recorded six songs, seen each week on a weekly television show It's Lulu, on BBC1 and hosted by Lulu, a former Eurovision winner. The group taped all six performances in the TV studio before the series itself began, with the video cut into the weekly show. For the presentation of the songs on week seven and the announcement of the result on week eight, the pre-recorded performances were run again.

Two of the songs ("No, No Nina" and "This House Runs on Sunshine") were co-written by members of the group. The public voted for "Let Me Be the One", composed by Paul Curtis, to go to the Eurovision final in Stockholm, Sweden in 1975. There, the group came second to the Dutch entry, Teach-In's "Ding-A-Dong". Having long stepped out of Richard's shadow, this was a rare excursion into vocals for a band known for instrumentals (although they had cut vocal tracks on most albums, plus some singles 'B' sides, and had four charting vocal singles in the '60s). Welch sang lead and let the world know when, forgetting a couple of words, he turned to colleagues and said "I knew it" in range of his microphone. Author and historian John Kennedy O'Connor notes in The Eurovision Song Contest – The Official History that they were not a popular choice to represent the UK and the viewers' postal vote was the lowest in 'Song For Europe' history.

EMI however released a compilation album in 1976, spanning 1962 to 1970: Rarities with sleeve notes by John Friesen. The first half of the album was from Marvin's solo career, and the second was by the Shadows. Following the rare vocal single "It'll Be Me, Babe", written and sung by Marvin & Farrar, John Farrar amicably left the band in 1976, moving to the US to become the music producer for Olivia Newton-John. (Among her hits, Farrar wrote "You're the One That I Want" from the film Grease which was covered by the Shadows in 1979, and "Suddenly", from the film Xanadu, which was a popular duet between Newton-John and Cliff Richard).

The packaging of hits in Twenty Golden Greats by EMI in 1977, which led to a number one album, prompted the group to re-form once more for a 'Twenty Golden Dates' tour around the UK, featuring Francis Monkman (formerly of Curved Air and soon to be in Sky) on keyboards and Alan Jones on bass guitar. Monkman left after that tour, and the line-up settled as Marvin, Welch and Bennett, supplemented on records and gigs by Cliff Hall (keyboards) and Alan Jones (bass). It was this line-up that reunited with Cliff Richard for two concerts at the London Palladium in March 1978. Highlights of the concert, including four solo Shadows tracks, were released the following year on the top ten charting album Thank You Very Much. On the back of this, The Shadows recorded an instrumental version of "Don't Cry for Me Argentina" from the West End production "Evita", released as a single at the tail end of 1978. The record eventually reached number 5 in the singles chart thereby giving the group their first top ten single since the 1960s.

In 1979, their version of "Cavatina" also became a top ten hit, and they recorded ten more tracks with bassist Jones and keyboardists Dave Lawson and Alan Hawkshaw for the album String of Hits on EMI which topped the British album charts. The success of this led to EMI issuing a follow-up album with 13 old tracks (including a Marvin solo track) and one unreleased track from the 'String of Hits' sessions. These tracks came from albums released earlier in the group's career of cover versions of hit singles; this was eventually released as Another String of Hot Hits in 1980.

=== 1980s ===
After 20 successful years together, the Shadows parted ways with their record company EMI and the group signed a 10-year contract to Polydor Records. The first album released under the Polydor banner was the aptly titled Change of Address in September 1980. With the influential arrival of keyboardist Cliff Hall, the musical style shifted from the traditional sound, becoming more electronic-based, with prominent keyboards and synthesizers burying Welch's contributions.

For the group's 25th anniversary in 1983, the Shadows released a double album on the Tellydisc label, titled Shadows Silver Album, which contained previously released recent material, along with new, recently recorded tracks. In July 1984, the Shadows reunited with Cliff Richard for a series of celebratory concerts at Wembley Arena and Birmingham NEC.

In 1986, the Shadows had a top ten hit on the LP chart with Moonlight Shadows, a cover album in the same vein as early Polydor releases with singles "Moonlight Shadow" and Bruce Springsteen's, "Dancing in the Dark" both failing to make a dent in the singles chart. Due to Alan Jones's involvement with the Dave Clark's musical Time, the bassist was not available to contribute to the album, and Paul Westwood temporarily sat in. Moonlight Shadows was released on LP and CD simultaneously as the group's third CD release. This top ten album consisted entirely of cover songs. The album spent 16 weeks on chart peaking at number 6.

In June 1989, the Shadows once more reunited with Cliff to celebrate 30 years in show business, where the singer filled London's Wembley Stadium for two nights, with a spectacular titled "The Event", in front of a combined audience of 144,000 people. As a special surprise for the fans, Cliff invited onto the stage former and classic-era members of the group Jet Harris and Tony Meehan to perform "Move It" with him and his band.

On 30 June 1990, Cliff and the Shadows performed to an estimated 120,000 people at Knebworth Park as part of an all-star concert line-up that also included Paul McCartney, Phil Collins, Elton John and Tears for Fears. The concert in aid of charity was televised around the world and helped to raise $10.5 million for disabled children and young musicians. Brian Bennett resigned from the group just before the group were to embark on what would be their final tour for 14 years, with Marvin, Welch and Bennett going their separate ways on 1 December following the final concert in Southampton. The last studio album the Shadows recorded before they disbanded, Reflection, was released in September.

=== Later career ===
The Shadows Live at Abbey Road

In December 2004, each of the then-current members of the Shadows was offered an appointment as an Officer of the Order of the British Empire (OBE), but Marvin declined.

The group reformed in 2004 for a farewell tour, and recorded "Life Story" (written by Lordan) to accompany a hits package of the same name which featured 1980s re-recordings of all their 1960s and 1970s hits. This opportunity to see Marvin, Welch and Bennett, joined on keyboards by Cliff Hall and on bass by Mark Griffiths, was successful enough that they extended the tour to continental Europe in 2005. The line-up was almost the same, except that Warren Bennett, son of Brian played the keyboards instead of Hall.

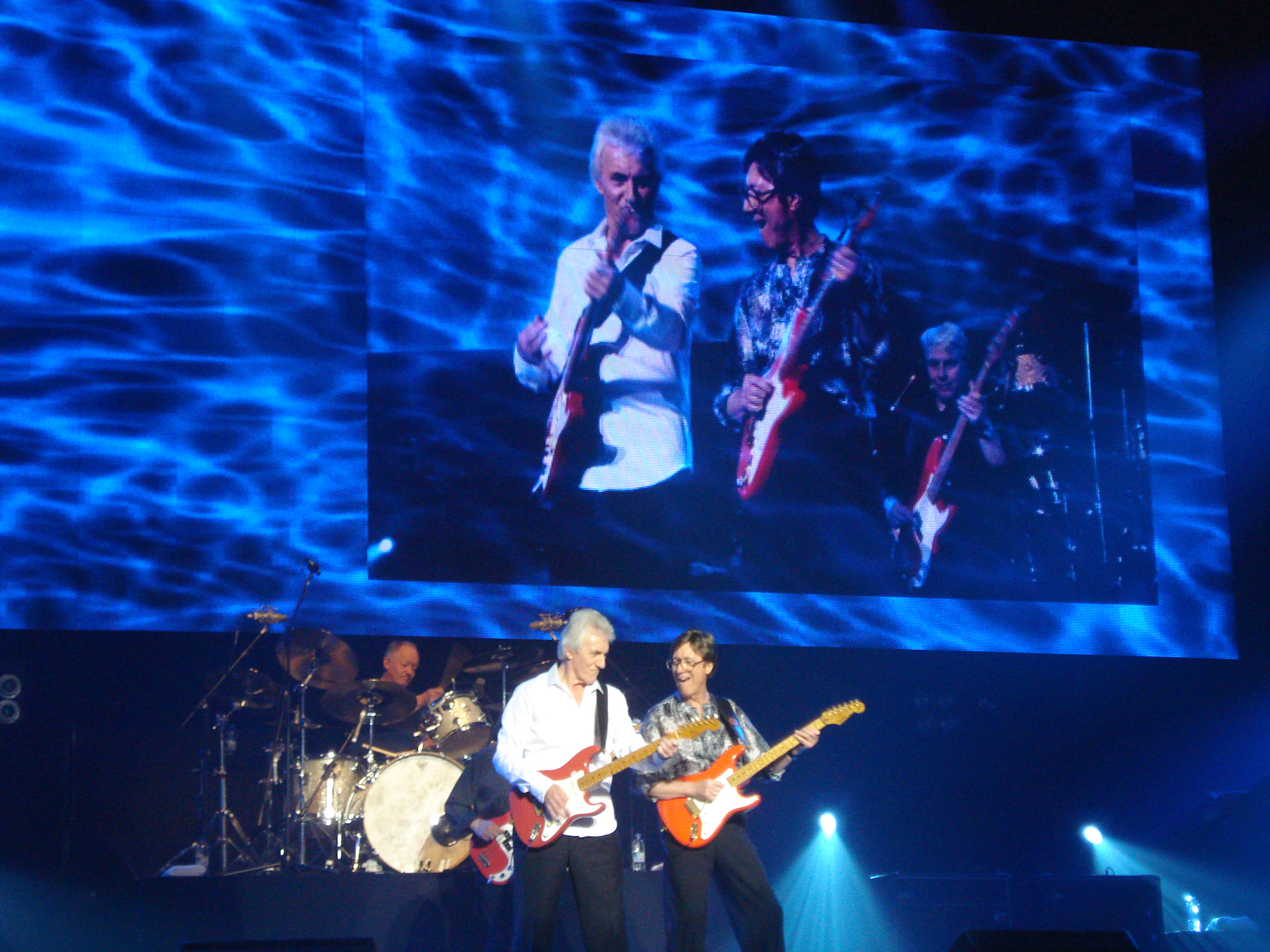
The Shadows in Brussels (2009)

Marvin, Welch and Bennett appeared together as special guests at Marty Wilde's 50th anniversary concert at the London Palladium on 27 May 2007, performing "Move It" with Wilde on vocals. The concert also featured former Shadows Jet Harris and Brian Locking.

On 11 December 2008, Richard and the Shadows performed at the Royal Variety Performance, at the same time announcing their forthcoming 50th anniversary tour. The tour began in September 2009 with 36 shows throughout the UK and continental Europe, extending in 2010 to Australia, New Zealand and South Africa. A 'final reunion' of Cliff and the Shadows was performed in the O2 Arena in London in November 2009. This performance is now available in the DVD The Final Reunion. A new studio based album, Reunited, featuring mostly rerecorded versions of their own hits, reached number four in the UK Albums Chart in 2009. "Singing the Blues", the first "Cliff Richard and the Shadows" single for 40 years, reached number 40 in the UK Singles Chart, and is Richard's most recent top 40 hit. The Final Tour was put on Blu-ray format by Eagle Records in 2010.

Welch, Bennett, Mark Griffiths and Warren Bennett performed two Shadows hits ("Apache" and "Wonderful Land") at Albert Lee's 70th birthday concerts at Cadogan Hall, London, on 1 and 2 March 2014, Lee playing with them on lead guitar. The Shadows recorded an interpretation of John Barry's "The Appointment" for the 2015 Brian Bennett album Shadowing John Barry. Rumours circled in late 2016 about a reunion and a tour with Richard, but this did not occur.

On 1 May 2020, BBC4 showed The Shadows at Sixty, a documentary looking back at their success as they celebrated the 60th anniversary of their first No 1 hit, "Apache". Marvin, Welch and Bennett all gave interviews and the programme included some previously unseen footage from their early days. Marvin, Welch, and Bennett performed a new version of "Apache", without bass and percussion, for use in the documentary.

On 17 December 2022, BBC2 showed Cliff at Christmas, with Welch and Bennett appearing as guests performing "Move It".

== Style and image ==
The Shadows are difficult to categorise because of their stylistic range, which includes pop, rock, surf rock and ballads with a jazz influence. Most of their tunes are instrumental rock, with a few vocal numbers. Their rhythmic style is primarily on the beat, with little syncopation. They said in 1992 that "Apache" set the tone with its surf guitar sound.

=== Band logo ===
The Shadows and their management did not exploit commercial opportunities such as self-promotion via artwork. They allowed Vox to produce metallic badges in a script typeface, with the group name on the front bottom right corner of all three Vox cabinets sometime during the early 1960s. This badge became the "default" band logo but was never commercially exploited by the group.

The Shadows never used the logo on the front of the bass drum, preferring to allow Meehan and Bennett to use their names instead. Belatedly, the logo was used once on the front artwork of the 1975 original studio album Specs Appeal. As of 2009, the logo still remains untrademarked and uncopyrighted.

In lieu of a proper band logo, four silhouettes of the original line-up, in ascending order of height, were used as a pseudo-logo on concert programme covers and artwork projects such as sheet music, EP and album covers. From left to right after the drum-kit were Meehan, Harris, Marvin, and Bruce Welch. The original artwork group silhouette was modified each time a member changed: the last version featured Brian Bennett and Rostill in the late 1960s. During the 1970s, EMI dropped the silhouettes, preferring to use two guitar necks or colour photos of the Shadows. During the later 1980s, Polydor used a red Fender Stratocaster (with white scratch plate) as a symbol.

=== The Shadows' walk ===
In 1958, Bruce Welch went to a concert as part of the 1958 Jerry Lee Lewis tour of the UK of which he said:

On the show was this black American band called the Treniers. Hank Marvin and I were at the back, and we were really impressed at the way the saxophone players moved in unison, taken, I suppose, from the Glenn Miller days. It looked fantastic and we thought, "We must do something like that because it looks so interesting from the front."

The Shadows developed sequences using their bodies and guitars in tempo with the music, such as 'the walk'. It has been copied by other groups as part of their Top of the Pops performances, notably Mud, the Rubettes, Showaddywaddy and Yellow Dog. 'The walk' is three steps within a 60–60–60-degree triangle, with a reverse right-heel back-kick, with optional can-can finale. This was varied throughout a gig during certain numbers, for example "FBI".

During the 1980s, rather than play in a static posture during an instrumental number, or using the walk, their live act was refined to include another movement. This featured Marvin, Welch and the bassist moving their guitars in time, or in sequence, with note or chord changes. Occasionally, during other instrumentals, this guitar presentation is re-engineered with Marvin and Welch acting out of sequence or alternating. When the group performed the popular live number "Shadoogie" (originally a track on their first LP), Hank and Bruce would walk forward whilst the bass player would walk back – and vice versa.

=== Stage names ===
During the late 1950s in the UK, it was a common practice for pop stars to adopt a stage name, and several members of the original Cliff Richard and the Shadows did so: Harry Webb became "Cliff Richard", Brian Rankin became "Hank B. Marvin", Terence Harris became "Jet Harris" and Bruce Cripps became "Bruce Welch". Subsequently, the names Cliff Richard and Hank Brian Marvin were confirmed by deed poll.

== Legacy and influence ==
The Shadows have been cited as a major influence on many guitarists, including Brian May, Eric Clapton, Mark Knopfler, Andy Summers, Ritchie Blackmore, David Gilmour, Tommy Emmanuel, Andy Powell and Tony Iommi. A tribute album, Twang! A Tribute to Hank Marvin & the Shadows (Capitol 33928), in October 1996 featured Blackmore, Iommi, Peter Green, Randy Bachman, Neil Young, Mark Knopfler, Peter Frampton and others playing Shadows hits. The early set of Queen (who played their first gig on 27 June 1970 with Freddie Mercury, Roger Taylor and Brian May) included a cover of Cliff and the Shadows' "Please Don't Tease".

The Shadows had a major influence on the 1960s Yugoslav beat bands, including Atomi, Bele Višnje, Bijele Strijele, Crni Biseri, Crveni Koralji, Daltoni, Delfini, Elektroni, Elipse, Iskre, Mladi, Samonikli, Siluete and Zlatni Dečaci, all of whom were the pioneering acts of the Yugoslav rock scene. In the words of Crni Biseri member Vladimir Janković "Jet" (who got his nickname after Harris), "[at one point] even the Beatles weren't as popular in Belgrade as the Shadows were". The second episode of Rockovnik, a Serbian 2011 documentary series about the Yugoslav rock scene, deals with the appearance of the Shadows and the influence they had on Yugoslav bands.

== Band members ==
=== Former members ===
- Terry Smart – drums (1958–1959)
- Ian Samwell – lead guitar, rhythm guitar, bass (1958; died 2003)
- Norman Mitham – rhythm guitar (1958)
- Ken Pavey – rhythm guitar (1958)
- Frank Clarke – bass (1958)
- Ernie Shear – rhythm guitar (1958)
- Hank Marvin – lead guitar, keyboards, vocals (1958–1968, 1969-1970, 1973–1990, 2004–2005, 2008–2010, 2015, 2020)
- Bruce Welch – rhythm guitar, vocals (1958–1968, 1973–1990, 2004–2005, 2008–2010, 2015, 2020)
- Jet Harris – bass, vocals (1958–1962; died 2011)
- Tony Meehan – drums, percussion (1959–1961, 1968; died 2005)
- Brian Bennett – drums, percussion, keyboards (1961–1968, 1969-1970, 1973–1990, 2004–2005, 2008–2010, 2015, 2020)
- Brian Locking – bass, harmonica (1962–1963, 1968; died 2020)
- John Rostill – bass, vocals (1963–1968, 1969-1970; died 1973)
- Alan Hawkshaw – keyboards (1967, 1969–1970, 1979, 1983; died 2021)
- John Farrar – rhythm and lead guitar, keyboards, vocals (1973–1975)
- Alan Tarney – bass (1973–1977)
- Cliff Hall – keyboards (1977–1990, 2004–2005)
- Alan Jones – bass (1977–1985, 1987–1989)
- Mark Griffiths – bass (1986–1987, 1989–1990, 2004–2005, 2008–2010, 2015)
- Warren Bennett – keyboards, percussion, harmonica, guitar (2005, 2008–2010, 2015)

=== Recording timeline ===
Year	Singles	Albums	Lead guitarist	Rhythm guitarist		Bass guitar	Drums	Keyboards
1959	"Feelin' Fine"		Hank Marvin	Bruce Welch		Jet Harris	Tony Meehan	
1959	"Jet Black"		Hank Marvin	Bruce Welch		Jet Harris	Tony Meehan	
1959	"Lonesome Fella"		Hank Marvin	Bruce Welch		Jet Harris	Tony Meehan	
1960	"Apache"		Hank Marvin	Bruce Welch		Jet Harris	Tony Meehan	
1960	"Man of Mystery"		Hank Marvin	Bruce Welch		Jet Harris	Tony Meehan	
1961	"F.B.I."		Hank Marvin	Bruce Welch		Jet Harris	Tony Meehan	
1961	"The Frightened City"		Hank Marvin	Bruce Welch		Jet Harris	Tony Meehan	
1961	"Kon-Tiki"	The Shadows	Hank Marvin	Bruce Welch		Jet Harris	Tony Meehan	
1961	"The Savage"		Hank Marvin	Bruce Welch		Jet Harris	Tony Meehan	
1962	"Wonderful Land"		Hank Marvin	Bruce Welch		Jet Harris	Tony Meehan	
1962	"Guitar Tango"		Hank Marvin	Bruce Welch		Brian Locking	Brian Bennett	
1962	"Dance On!"	Out of the Shadows	Hank Marvin	Bruce Welch		Brian Locking	Brian Bennett	
1963	"Foot Tapper"		Hank Marvin	Bruce Welch		Brian Locking	Brian Bennett	
1963	"Atlantis"		Hank Marvin	Bruce Welch		Brian Locking	Brian Bennett	
1963	"Shindig"		Hank Marvin	Bruce Welch		Brian Locking	Brian Bennett	
1963	"Geronimo"		Hank Marvin	Bruce Welch		Brian Locking	Brian Bennett	
1964	"Theme for Young Lovers"		Hank Marvin	Bruce Welch		Brian Locking	Brian Bennett	
1964	"The Rise and Fall of Flingel Bunt"	Dance with the Shadows	Hank Marvin	Bruce Welch		John Rostill	Brian Bennett	Norrie Paramor
1964	"Rhythm & Greens"		Hank Marvin	Bruce Welch		John Rostill	Brian Bennett	
1964	"Genie with the Light Brown Lamp"		Hank Marvin	Bruce Welch		John Rostill	Brian Bennett	
1965	"Mary Anne"		Hank Marvin	Bruce Welch		John Rostill	Brian Bennett	
1965	"Stingray"		Hank Marvin	Bruce Welch		John Rostill	Brian Bennett	
1965	"Don't Make My Baby Blue"	The Sound of the Shadows	Hank Marvin	Bruce Welch		John Rostill	Brian Bennett	Norrie Paramor
1965	"The War Lord"		Hank Marvin	Bruce Welch		John Rostill	Brian Bennett	
1966	"I Met a Girl"		Hank Marvin	Bruce Welch		John Rostill	Brian Bennett	
1966	"A Place in the Sun"	Shadow Music	Hank Marvin	Bruce Welch		John Rostill	Brian Bennett	Brian Bennett
1966	"The Dream I Dream"		Hank Marvin	Bruce Welch		John Rostill	Brian Bennett	
1967	"Maroc 7"	Jigsaw	Hank Marvin	Bruce Welch		John Rostill	Brian Bennett	
1967	"Tomorrow's Cancelled"	From Hank, Bruce, Brian and John	Hank Marvin	Bruce Welch		John Rostill	Brian Bennett	Alan Hawkshaw
1968	Dear Old Mrs Bell		Hank Marvin	Bruce Welch		John Rostill	Brian Bennett	Alan Hawkshaw
1970		Shades of Rock	Hank Marvin			John Rostill	Brian Bennett	Alan Hawkshaw
1973	"Turn Around and Touch Me"	Rockin' with Curly Leads	Hank Marvin	Bruce Welch	John Farrar	Alan Tarney	Brian Bennett	
1975	"Let Me Be the One"	Specs Appeal	Hank Marvin	Bruce Welch	John Farrar	Alan Tarney	Brian Bennett	John Farrar
1975	"Run Billy Run"		Hank Marvin	Bruce Welch	John Farrar	Alan Tarney	Brian Bennett	
1976	"It'll Be Me Babe"		Hank Marvin	Bruce Welch	John Farrar	Alan Tarney	Brian Bennett	
1977	"Another Night"	Tasty	Hank Marvin	Bruce Welch	John Farrar	Alan Tarney	Brian Bennett	Brian Bennett
1978	"Don't Cry for Me Argentina"		Hank Marvin	Bruce Welch		Alan Jones	Brian Bennett	Cliff Hall
1979	"Theme from 'The Deer Hunter' (Cavatina)"	String of Hits	Hank Marvin	Bruce Welch		Alan Jones	Brian Bennett	Cliff Hall
1979	"Rodrigo's Guitar Concerto de Aranjuez"		Hank Marvin	Bruce Welch		Alan Jones	Brian Bennett	Cliff Hall
1980	"Riders in the Sky"		Hank Marvin	Bruce Welch		Alan Jones	Brian Bennett	Cliff Hall
1980	"Heart of Glass"		Hank Marvin	Bruce Welch		Alan Jones	Brian Bennett	Cliff Hall
1980	"Equinoxe (Part V)"	Change of Address	Hank Marvin	Bruce Welch		Alan Jones	Brian Bennett	Cliff Hall
1980	"Mozart Forte"		Hank Marvin	Bruce Welch		Alan Jones	Brian Bennett	Cliff Hall
1981	"The Third Man"		Hank Marvin	Bruce Welch		Alan Jones	Brian Bennett	Cliff Hall
1981	"Telstar"		Hank Marvin	Bruce Welch		Alan Jones	Brian Bennett	Cliff Hall
1981	"Imagine/Woman"	Hits Right Up Your Street	Hank Marvin	Bruce Welch		Alan Jones	Brian Bennett	Cliff Hall
1982	"Theme from Missing"		Hank Marvin	Bruce Welch		Alan Jones	Brian Bennett	Cliff Hall
1982	"Treat Me Nice"	Life in the Jungle	Hank Marvin	Bruce Welch		Alan Jones	Brian Bennett	Cliff Hall
1983	"Diamonds"		Hank Marvin	Bruce Welch		Alan Jones	Brian Bennett	Cliff Hall
1983	"Going Home (Theme from Local Hero)"	XXV	Hank Marvin	Bruce Welch		Alan Jones	Brian Bennett	Cliff Hall
1984	"On a Night Like This"	Guardian Angel	Hank Marvin	Bruce Welch		Alan Jones	Brian Bennett	Cliff Hall
1986	"Moonlight Shadow"		Hank Marvin	Bruce Welch		Alan Jones	Brian Bennett	Cliff Hall
1986	"Dancing in the Dark"		Hank Marvin	Bruce Welch		Alan Jones	Brian Bennett	Cliff Hall
1986	"Themes from EastEnders and Howards' Way"	Moonlight Shadows	Hank Marvin	Bruce Welch		Alan Jones	Brian Bennett	Cliff Hall
1987	"Pulaski"		Hank Marvin	Bruce Welch		Alan Jones	Brian Bennett	Cliff Hall
1987	"Walking in the Air"	Simply Shadows	Hank Marvin	Bruce Welch		Alan Jones	Brian Bennett	Cliff Hall
1989	"Mountains of the Moon"	Steppin' to the Shadows	Hank Marvin	Bruce Welch		Alan Jones	Brian Bennett	Cliff Hall
1989	"Shadowmix"		Hank Marvin	Bruce Welch		Alan Jones	Brian Bennett	Cliff Hall
1990		Reflection	Hank Marvin	Bruce Welch		Mark Griffiths	Brian Bennett	Cliff Hall

== Discography ==
- The Shadows (1961)
- Out of the Shadows (1962)
- Dance with the Shadows (1964)
- The Sound of the Shadows (1965)
- Shadow Music (1966)
- Jigsaw (1967)
- From Hank, Bruce, Brian and John (1967)
- Shades of Rock (1970)
- Rockin' with Curly Leads (1973)
- Specs Appeal (1975)
- Tasty (1977)
- String of Hits (1979)
- Change of Address (1980)
- Hits Right Up Your Street (1981)
- Life in the Jungle (1982)
- XXV (1983)
- Guardian Angel (1984)
- Moonlight Shadows (1986)
- Simply Shadows (1987)
- Steppin' to the Shadows (1989)
- Reflection (1990)

Preceded by Olivia Newton-John with "Long Live Love"	UK in the Eurovision Song Contest; 1975	Succeeded by Brotherhood of Man with "Save Your Kisses for Me"
