= Warren Bennett =

Warren Bennett may refer to:

- Warren Bennett (golfer)
- Warren Bennett (musician)
