= London's Burning (TV series) =

British television drama series (1986–2002)

- Title card used in Series 11 (1998)
- Genre: Drama
- Created by: Jack Rosenthal
- Starring: James Hazeldine; Glen Murphy; James Marcus; Sean Blowers; Richard Walsh; Katharine Rogers; Samantha Beckinsale; Ross Boatman; Gerard Horan; Mark Arden; Michael Garner; Rupert Baker; Zoe Heyes; Steven Houghton; Heather Peace; Anthony Green; Andrew Kazamia; Treva Etienne; Stephen North; Jim Alexander; Ben Onwukwe; Vanessa Pett; Yvonne Edgell; Ian Burfield; Sam Callis; John Alford
- Country of origin: United Kingdom
- Original language: English
- No. of series: 14
- No. of episodes: 172 (list of episodes)

Production
- Executive producers: Linda Agran (Movie, Series 1–2); Nick Elliott (Series 3–5); Sarah Wilson (Series 6–8); Sally Head (Series 9–10); Laura Mackie (Series 11–12); David Newcombe (Series 13); Michelle Buck and Damien Timmer (Series 14)
- Producers: Paul Knight (Movie, Series 1–10); David Shanks (Series 11); Angus Towler (Series 13); David Newcombe (Series 12 & 14)
- Editor: Nigel Parkes
- Running time: 60/75/90 minutes
- Production company: LWT

Original release
- Network: ITV
- Release: 7 December 1986 – 25 August 2002

London's Burning is a British television drama programme, produced by LWT for the ITV network. It was based on the 1986 TV movie of the same name, and focused on the lives of members of the London Fire Brigade, principally those of the Blue Watch, at the fictional Blackwall fire station. It began with the movie (pilot), broadcast on 7 December 1986. This was then followed by a total of 14 series, which ran from 20 February 1988 to 25 August 2002.

By 2002, it was one of ITV's longest running TV programmes, after Coronation Street, Emmerdale and The Bill.

== Movie ==
Jack Rosenthal's original two-hour TV movie, directed by Les Blair, was broadcast on ITV on 7 December 1986. The Broadwater Farm riot, in north London, was one inspiration for the screenplay. Unlike the final years of the London's Burning TV series, the movie (along with the following early TV series), was a black comedy that also examined serious issues, primarily that while female and Black, Asian and minority ethnic firefighters had to deal with prejudice on the job, the prejudices in their own families and neighbourhoods could be far worse.

== The series ==
=== Series 1–3 (1988–1990) ===
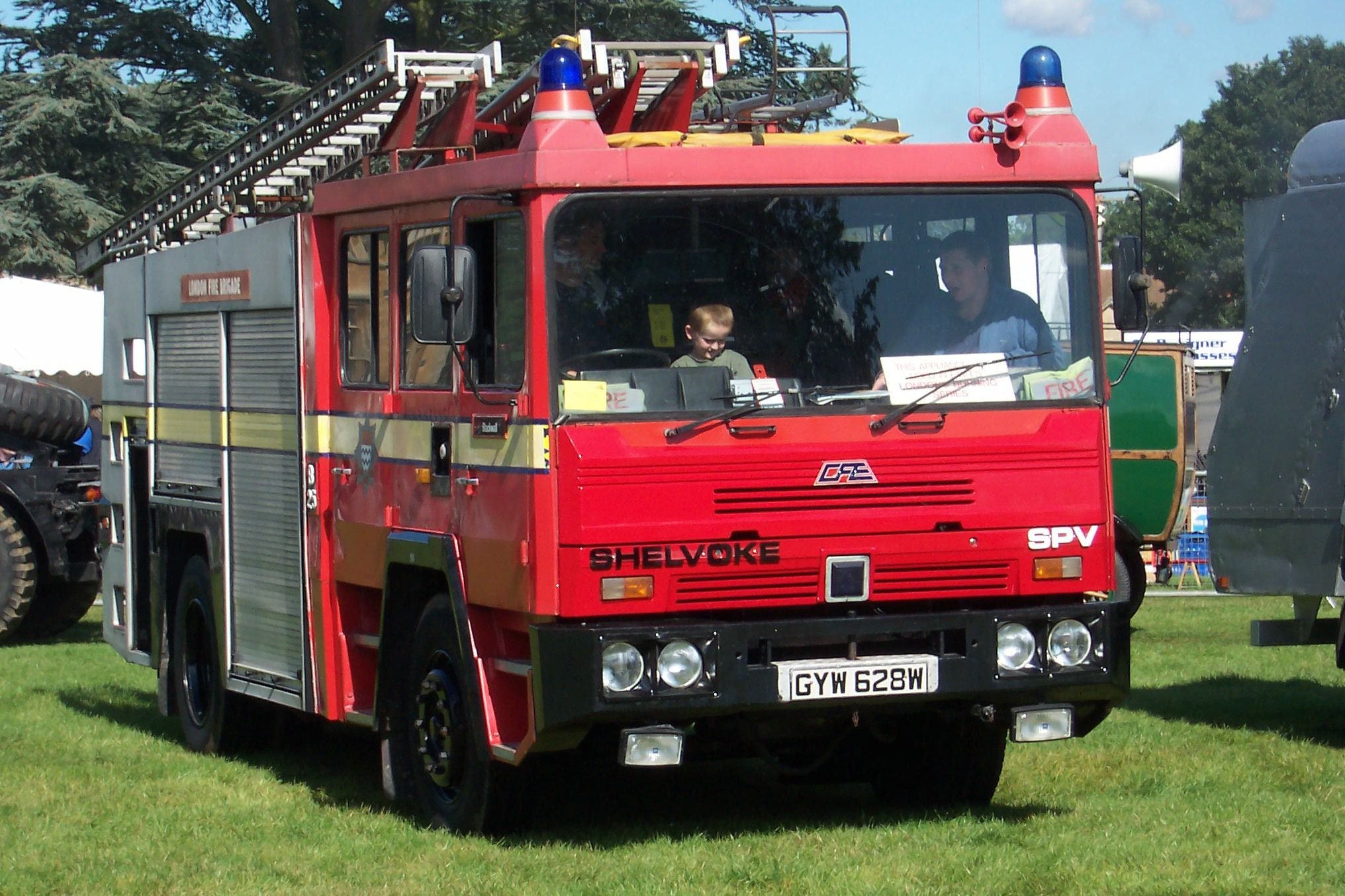
This Shelvoke & Drewry fire engine featured in series 1 and 2

The TV show was a weekly episodic drama that began on 20 February 1988. Paul Knight was the show's producer. Knight appointed writers such as Anita Bronson, David Humphries, Simon Sharkey, and Tony Hoare. Directors included Gerry Poulson, Gerry Mill, John Reardon, Keith Washington and Alan Wareing. The camera crews had to be committed and cautious when working with fire. Emergencies—or 'shouts'—would not only be fires, but included a range of incidents from cats up trees to major road accidents. Each episode ran for 50 minutes (one hour with advertisement breaks). The first series (1988) consisted of five episodes while the second series (1989) and the third series (1990) consisted of eight episodes. These series episodes were mostly filmed at Dockhead fire station in Bermondsey in London, and used actual firefighters working shifts as extras for the programme. A studio near the station was used for crowded mess scenes, but they also used the fire station's actual mess, bay and watchroom throughout the series.

=== 'Ding Dong Merrily' Christmas special ===
A Christmas special was transmitted between series 1 and series 2 on 25 December 1988, on ITV. The special followed Blue Watch on duty on Christmas Day.

=== 'Stunts and Stars' documentary ===
Filming an interior scene at Jacob Street Studios. This screenshot is taken from the documentary.

A special 30-minute behind-the-scenes documentary, which originally aired on 8 September 1991, marked the launch of the fourth series. This documentary was also released onto VHS video, by Clear Vision Video. It was then added as a DVD extra, on the Series 4 DVD release by Network.

=== Series 4 (1991) ===
In 1991, LWT commissioned 10 episodes for Series 4, which became the most popular series of the drama. Paul Knight had appointed Brian Clark as the Fire Brigade Advisor and, along with the writers and directors, he decided on a climax to the fourth series. The psychological state of one of the main characters deteriorates after being buried alive under a collapsed wall whilst at a spectacular 20-pump warehouse fire. Series 4's climax won the programme its record rating of 18.86 million viewers.

=== Series 5 (1992) ===
Each series now included a major disaster or "shout". In Episode 1 of Series 5 (1992), the drive mechanism of a Ferris wheel ride at a fairground is jammed by a troublesome youth (played by Liam McGuire) armed with an iron bar. The ride collapses into the electrical roof of a bumper car ride, which sparks fuel tanks resulting in a huge fire whilst people are trapped in the crushed metal. The series attracted 17 million viewers.

=== Series 6–9 (1993–1996) ===
In the early 1990s, the ratings averaged 17–18 million viewers. In 1995 (Series 8), ratings fell to 16 million viewers.

Paul Knight decided it was time for a real shock—a tragic exit for one of the main characters, who had starred in the show for nearly ten years. The man who was to be killed was Sub Officer John Hallam—a dedicated and loyal member of the watch and the London Fire Brigade. Hallam was killed off in 1996 (Series 9) during a huge warehouse fire, where he and a colleague, Leading Firefighter Geoff Pearce, were attempting to rescue four teenage girls on an unstable gantry 80 feet (24 m) above a blaze in the basement. Hallam held the gantry steady for Pearce as he walked across with one of the girls. As Hallam attempted to cross, the gantry cracked and Hallam fell to his death. The writers developed a storyline about Pearce feeling an overwhelming sense of guilt after the accident, which would lead to him considering a transfer. Series 9 attracted 16.8 million viewers. Series 9 ended on a cliffhanger when two Dennis RS Fire Appliances crashed whilst rushing to a shout.

=== Series 10 (1997) ===
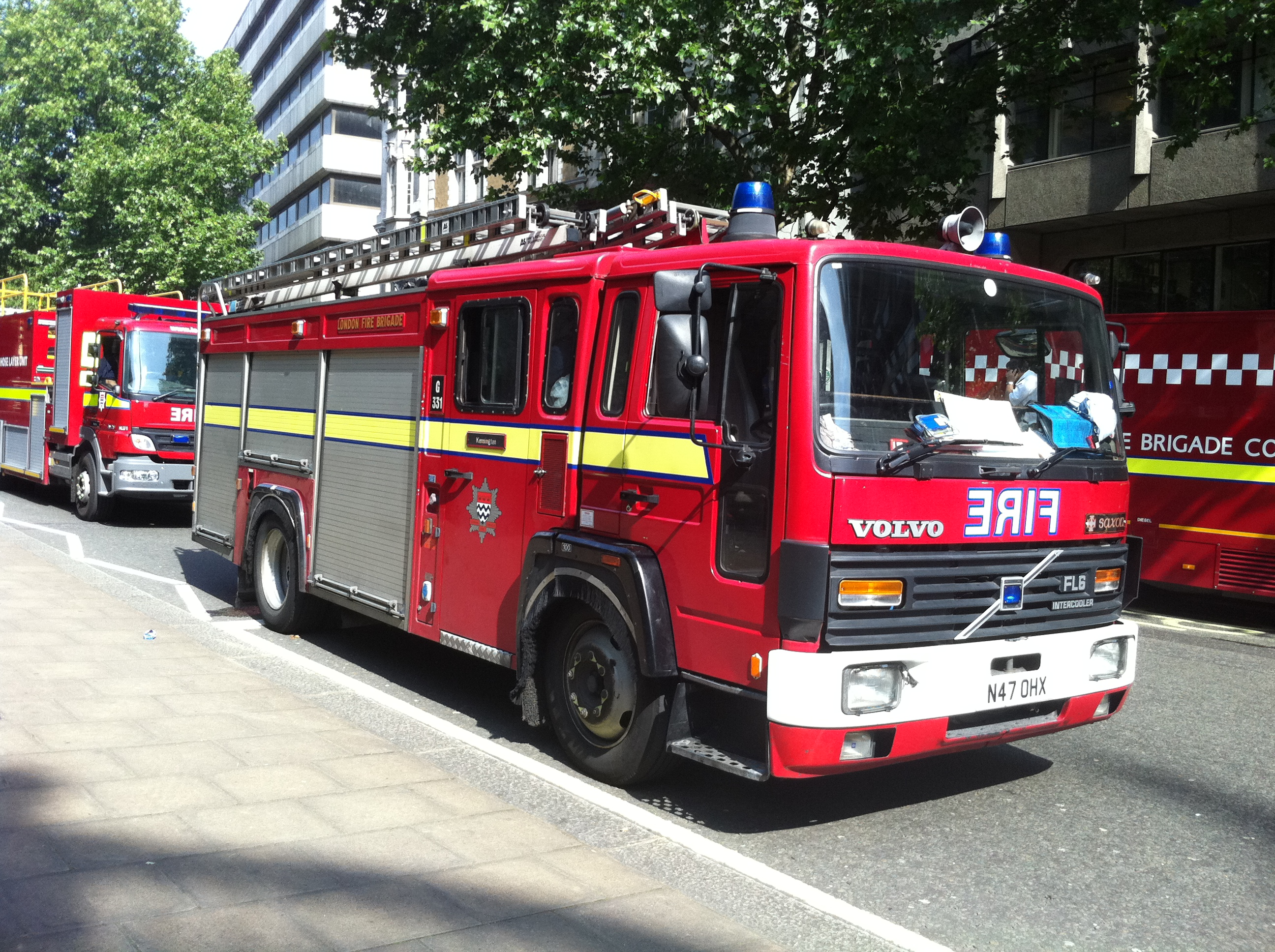
Volvo FL7 pumping appliances were introduced to replace the older Dennis RS series models.

Series 10 was the last series produced by Paul Knight, who left to produce episodes of The Knock. Budget cuts led to a small number of scenes being done with computer-generated imagery. Notable 'shouts' included ones at a paint factory and another at a bus depot. With 18 episodes this was the longest series of the show.

Series 10 would also see the arrival of the Volvo FL appliances to the show.

=== Series 11–14 (1998–2002) ===
London's Burning continued on into 1998 with a new producer, David Shanks (later David Newcombe). Series 11, 12 and 13 saw the return to firefighting scenes as the primary focus. Series 14, however, was almost completely based on soap opera-style story lines, with the number of fire 'shouts' severely reduced and completely ignored the new rank structure of the LFB that was introduced at the start of series 13; also some old characters had left, with new ones added, with no explanation – confusing matters for the viewer. Viewing figures slumped drastically and the series was critically panned.

=== 'Duty Log' video special ===
In 2000, a 90-minute behind-the-scenes special was released on VHS video.

== Production ==
=== Theme music ===
The London's Burning theme used between series 1 and series 10 was composed by Simon Brint, Rowland Rivron, and Roddy Matthews; it was loosely based on the children's round of the same title (sung by a group of schoolchildren in the pilot film.) Series 11–13 used a theme composed by Warren Bennett (son of The Shadows drummer Brian Bennett); revamped opening titles created by Capital FX were introduced. The theme tune and opening titles were updated again for Series 14. The titles were made to fit the look ITV were giving to shows at the time. The series 14 theme was composed by Stuart Hancock and Toby Jarvis. Hancock also composed the original incidental music score to all episodes of series 14.

=== Opening titles ===
Series 1–10 lacked a title sequence; the episodes opened with the text "London's Burning" in bold capitals superimposed in white over the opening scene of the episode. Series 11–13 used a montage of action shots superimposed over a fiery background as the text "London's Burning" superimposed in gold and black slowly grew in size over the course of the sequence before quickly zooming to most of the length of the screen on the final musical flourish. Series 14 used a shorter montage of action and character shots before the text "london's burning" in orange and white appeared and moved closer together over a shot of fire engines emerging from the station that blurred out.

== Cancellation ==
In 2002, London's Burning was cut from the schedule; the final episode was broadcast on 25 August 2002 in a two-hour slot. The replacement show, Steel River Blues, bombed in the ratings, and was axed after just one series.

== Characters ==
=== Station Officers ===
- Sidney Tate (James Marcus; movie, series 1–3) (also Temporary Assistant Divisional Officer (ADO)) – Tate was a fatherly figure for the watch. He was married to Nancy (a LFB control officer) and their only child had died years earlier. They occasionally fostered a disabled child, Paul, from a local foster home at Christmas, ultimately adopting him. Having been in the brigade for many years, he saw himself as old-fashioned and was sometimes at odds with modern regulations. The new ADO, Scase, did not approve of Tate's more pragmatic methods, especially when Tate defied his orders at a 'shout'. Tate was generally quiet and steady: he built matchstick models during down time (especially one of Alexandra Palace, which LFB had failed to save in one of the worst London fires in modern history), put HP Sauce on virtually all of his food, and was more than a bit rattled by having a woman assigned to his station. However, Tate was capable of old-fashioned discipline: a prank against Josie, and a fistfight between Malcolm and George, both garnered volcanic eruptions. Tate was forced to retire from the service at the end of series 3 after failing a routine medical. Although the character never appeared again, Tate was referred to a few times in the subsequent series, particularly by Sicknote and Bayleaf, who wondered what he would make of the progress the brigade was making. His replacement, SO Georgiadis, even once remarked: "I am not 'Good Old Uncle Sid'!"
- Nick 'Zorba' Georgiadis (Andrew Kazamia; series 4–11) (also Assistant Divisional Officer (ADO)). Nick took over from Tate as Station Officer in Series 4. He got his nickname due to his Greek-Cypriot origins. Nick was a disciplinarian, and was not impressed by some of Blue Watch's lax ways upon his arrival. However, he proved to be very caring and compassionate as he settled into the station, and like Tate, became something of a father figure to the members of the Watch. Nick's traditionalist family tried to arrange a marriage for him, but he resisted. He had an affair with his married cousin Ariadne. She died from injuries she incurred in a fall but their unborn son survived. Distraught, Nick initially struggled to cope with her death and his new son. He later met Dutch firefighter, Marianne, when she was at a demonstration show in the UK, and after a stop-start romance they eventually moved in together. Nick was promoted to ADO in Series 11, but had some trouble adjusting to the role and was never convinced that Chris Hammond was the right station officer for Blue Watch, especially after he found out that Hammond was being hounded by gangsters for an unpaid debt. Before he could take the matter up with DO Chapman, Nick was killed at a cinema fire when a ceiling collapsed on him.
- Chris Hammond (Jonathan Guy Lewis; series 11–13) Chris was always a Temporary Station Officer for Blue Watch throughout his stay. He had got involved with gangsters and built up a debt which he paid off by signing over his 4x4. Chris had a daughter, Lisa, it was revealed after he previously told the watch that he never had kids. He had not seen his daughter for 11 years. He took over as head of the watch from Sub Officer Pearce and it immediately got under Geoff's skin but Geoff mellowed and they eventually had a good working relationship. Chris found out in series 11 that his daughter was infatuated with Recall. He totally misread the situation at one point, and called the police accusing Recall of rape, when she came home upset after Recall rebuffed her advances. In series 12 after dropping a very drunk George home after a night of gambling, a kiss with George's wife Kelly soon began an affair which rapidly progressed. Chris spoke up for Recall as a supporting witness at Recall's assault inquiry. Chris was left upset just after the halfway point in series 12, when his old watch rival but now superior to him D.O. Griggs, informed him he was being transferred to health and safety with immediate effect. At this point his affair with Kelly was still in progress. George discovered what was going on during Pearce's wedding day when he saw Kelly and Chris kissing. Chris was not seen again until series 13 when he was reunited with his watch, and George, now divorced from Kelly, got jealous and angry when he saw Chris put his hand on Kelly and punched him to the ground. He later made amends with George by convincing him to patch things up with Andi.
- John Coleman (Edward Peel (Later ADO Coleman); series 12–13) John Coleman became the permanent Station Officer in Series 12. His previous stations include Clapham and King's Cross. Coleman always stuck to the rules and was very set in his ways, in the same way as Sidney Tate. Coleman was married, but his wife had died 22 years before, after he had fallen asleep at the wheel of his car and crashed. He had never been with another woman until he meets Councillor Alison Hemmings. (This led to Sub-Officer Pearce spreading a rumour that Coleman was homosexual, ended by Coleman with a brief and bitter discussion – "No wonder they call you 'Poison'!") While out bowling with Alison, it reminded him of his ex-wife and he left without warning. Once Alison had caught up with him, Coleman revealed the truth of what happened to his wife. He was almost killed when a ceiling collapsed on him when he was caught at a hospital fire in Series 13. Coleman was never seen again after Series 13 and no explanation was given.
- Mick Callaghan (Anthony Green; series 14) Mick never seemed to be taken seriously by Blue Watch as Station Officer and his authority was always undermined by them, particularly by Frank Mooney, who slept with his wife and taunted him over his crush on Sally. However, Mick proved early on that he could think quickly, after saving the trapped occupants of a car in the Thames. Both Mick and Frank Mooney received a Queen's medal for Gallantry. Mick was married to Shauna, although he had strong feelings for Sally Fields, but did nothing about it. After Recall's death, Mick admitted that he knew that Recall was not well, but he did not act on it. Mick's house burned down after Shauna had messed around with the electrics. In the end, Mick had decided to make more time for his family. Shauna was pregnant, but deep down Mick knew that the baby was Frank's.

=== Sub Officers/Watch Commanders ===
- John Hallam (Sean Blowers; movie, series 1–9) (also Temporary Station Officer Hallam) – John was the uptight and hen-pecked late/former husband of Sandra. His catchphrase, whether spoken genuinely or ironically, was "I'm impressed!" He tried for promotion several times, but was never successful. He drew laughs from the other firefighters when he accidentally singed his eyebrows after his elderly father-in-law poured too much brandy over the Christmas pudding, and when his friend Duffy rubbed lipstick over his underwear for Sandra to find. He testified against a group of firefighters from another station for their racial harassment of a black firefighter, whom they nearly drowned, while Hallam was in charge. He briefly served as Blue Watch Station Officer after Tate's enforced retirement, but was relegated (and mildly humiliated) back to "Sub" when Nick Georgiadis was assigned to the post. Hallam was traumatised after being buried alive when a wall collapsed at a 'shout' in series 4, taking many months to recover. A stint working for the Fire Investigation Unit led to Hallam being offered an opportunity to work as a safety adviser at a Japanese company's London office; while Sandra was keen, Hallam wasn't, and he stayed in the brigade. He was killed following a warehouse fire 'shout' in series 9, when a gantry collapsed and he fell 80 feet (24 m).
- Carole 'Doris' Webb (Zoe Heyes; series 9–10) – Liverpudlian Carole became the Watch's new Sub Officer in series 9, having previously worked as in the brigade's Health and Safety department. She was married to Martin, another firefighter, who had had to retire from the brigade after being run over by a car whilst drunk, but who walked out on her when she refused to lie to the police after he crashed their car into a cyclist. She was attracted to both Firefighter Jack Morgan and ADO Patrick Davis, and had a brief relationship with the latter, but she left him when she found out he was still married. When the brigade announced plans to phase out Sub Officers from two-appliance stations, Carole was informed that she would be transferred to take charge at Upham station, but in the final episode of series 10, she was told she could remain at Blackwall after all. However, the character did not appear again from series 11 onwards, and no explanation was provided.

=== Leading Firefighters/Crew Commanders ===
- Malcolm Cross (Rupert Baker; movie, series 1–5) – Public school-educated and articulate, Malcolm was often the instigator of pranks at the station. He struck up a relationship with Samina during an inspection of a clothing factory, impressing her by speaking Punjabi, and was devastated when she was killed in a fire. Malcolm blamed himself for Roland Cartwright's death, since he had ordered him to use his breathing apparatus in an underwater rescue, even though it was unsuitable for such use. Malcolm received a commendation for bravery in series 3 after rescuing a man who had been buried alive at a building site. He took on new flatmate Helen during series 4, and they eventually began a relationship. He bid final farewell to Blackwall during series 5 and relocated to Brussels with Helen.
- Geoff 'Poison' Pearce (Michael Garner; series 6–14) (Later Sub Officer Pearce) – Pearce joined Blue Watch as Leading Firefighter in series 6 following Malcolm's departure. He had previously been a Sub Officer in Bristol, but took a temporary demotion to join the London Fire Brigade. He was nicknamed Poison, for his habit of spreading malicious gossip and rumours around the station. He was noted for his incessant grovelling towards senior officers by offering them cups of tea, and for his irritating catchphrase "Chop-chop!" when giving orders to the other watch members. He was married to Patti, but they divorced when she had an affair. He later met Fiona, eventually marrying her and having a daughter. Pearce was wracked with guilt after Hallam's death and considered requesting a transfer, but he stayed and had become the watch's permanent Sub Officer by the start of Series 11. Despite retaining his rather pompous and humourless nature, he managed to become a more respected member of the Watch during the later series.
- Dan Barratt (Brad Gorton; series 11–12) (Also Temporary Sub Officer Barratt) Dan joined Blue Watch as a Leading Firefighter, and was Temporary Sub Officer for Blue Watch while Nick Georgiadis was acting as ADO. Dan joined the brigade on a fast-track programme after graduating from Durham University, but never rose any higher in the ranks. He decided he could not handle the task of being a Leading Firefighter and stepped down to the rank of Firefighter, insisting that he wanted to earn his promotions. His dad was a firefighter who had died on duty and was known personally by Station Officer Coleman. Dan's decisions were met with scepticism from the rest of the lads as he always proved they were right and he should pay more attention to them. Dan also got the nicknames of the watch mixed up early in his time at Blue Watch. Dan accompanied A.D.O. Georgiadis inside the cinema fire to help free Marianne and his son. He guided them to safety after the ceiling collapsed on Georgiadis, after Nick pushed Dan and Marianne out from under the falling rubble which killed Nick. Dan had a brief relationship with Firefighter Sally Fields, but her heart was with Joe Walker. Dan then fell for Carmen, a Leading Firefighter from Shadbrook Fire Station, when they had the Turntable Ladder appliance temporarily stationed at Blackwall. After he got injured in the blast which killed Sicknote and Joe at the end of series 12, Dan did not return to Blackwall and set out to travel the world instead.
- Rob 'Hyper' Sharpe (Connor Byrne; series 12–13) Irishman Hyper joined the Watch in Series 12 as Jack Morgan's replacement. His previous stations included a temporary position at Euston and a position at Enfield. The truth came out about Hyper's homosexuality in Series 12 after Geoff became suspicious. Hyper decided to tell the truth, before it was revealed by anyone else. Joe and Geoff did not take the revelation very well and it took them both a while to get used to it, Joe in particular. Hyper was promoted to Leading Firefighter following Dan's departure and, after Sally was raped by Sean Bateman, Hyper blamed himself because he never returned home that night. The character had left Blackwall for unexplained reasons by the start of Series 14.

=== Firefighters ===
- Leslie 'Charisma' Appleby (Gerard Horan; movie, series 1–2, series 7) – Nicknamed "Charisma" because he didn't have any, he was a bore who lived in an imaginary world, claiming to be an accomplished sportsman with many friends. Charisma never knew his father, and had grown up believing his grandmother was his mother and his real mother was actually his sister. He had a romance with Donna, but could not force her to leave his house when they split, due to her technically being his common law wife. When his mother visited from Australia, she forcibly evicted Donna. Charisma left Blackwall in series 2 to take up a brigade staff job, and made a surprise return to the Watch in series 7. He transferred to Bromley Fire Station at the end of this series.
- Kenny 'Rambo' Baines (Jerome Flynn; movie) – Musclebound and often seen working out in the gym, Rambo was among those who did not take kindly to Josie joining the Watch. He was married to Carol, who attended gatherings of the Watch's wives. He did not appear in the series, and no explanation was provided.
- Roland 'Vaseline' Cartwright (Mark Arden; movie, series 1–2) – Vaseline was a brash male chauvinist with three wives (each named Marion) and a string of mistresses, none of whom could ever find him, as he was often moonlighting. In the movie, Vaseline was portrayed as racist and sexist, particularly towards Ethnic and Josie respectively, but his racism and sexism became less prominent during the series. He had a son with the third Marion, and found a softer side when he was forced to babysit him. Vaseline drowned when his breathing apparatus malfunctioned underwater whilst rescuing the occupant of a van which had fallen into a dock.
- Josie Ingham (Katharine Rogers; movie, series 1–3, series 4) – Josie was the first woman to join Blue Watch, and was initially shunned by the male members. She eventually won their respect and became particularly close to Bayleaf. They slept together, and though she regretted having done so, she was envious when Bayleaf began dating Clare. Josie was nearly raped by a man she met at an evening class, but managed to fight him off. When she later spotted him in a shop, she caused a scene until he was arrested. Josie was promoted to Leading Firefighter in series 3 and transferred to Charlton. She made a final appearance in the series when she met up with Blue Watch again at the twenty pump warehouse fire which closed series 4.
- Andreas 'Ethnic' Lewis (Gary McDonald; movie) – Known as "Ethnic" due to being black, he lived on a rough council estate and as such had to keep his job secret. He was promoted to Leading Fireman at Archway station, but was killed before he could take the post when rioters on his estate dropped a concrete paving slab on him after he intervened to help Charisma.
- Bert 'Sicknote' Quigley (Richard Walsh; movie, series 1–12) – A chronic hypochondriac, Sicknote was often complaining about his health, from ulcers and headaches to a bad back. With ambitions to be a professional actor or singer, he was often in amateur stage productions with his wife Jean, which the other members of the watch grudgingly attended. He was a social activist, attempting to introduce a smoking ban and healthier food to Blackwall, campaigning to save a local city farm and against the construction of a by-pass, and was elected as a local councillor for the Green Party. He received his twenty-year service medal in Series 9, although he pessimistically regarded this as a confirmation of old age. Sicknote was killed in an explosion at a Chinese fireworks factory in Series 12. He was the last remaining character in the series from the pilot movie.
- Mike 'Bayleaf' Wilson (James Hazeldine; movie, series 1–8, series 9) – Bayleaf was mess manager and a popular long-term member of Blue Watch, receiving his twenty-year service medal in series 3. Separated from his wife Karen, with whom he had a daughter, Melanie, he had a brief romance with Josie in series 1 and later met Clare, whom he eventually married; however, Karen continued to cause problems when she abducted Melanie and took her to Spain with her new husband. He was knocked unconscious when a wall collapsed and left him buried at the twenty-pump 'shout' in series 4, but escaped serious injury and the PTSD which affected Hallam after the same incident. In series 6, Bayleaf crashed the appliance into a car, leaving a passenger badly injured. He subsequently suffered nightmares and received death threats, but was eventually cleared of any wrongdoing. Bayleaf left the brigade in series 8 to open a restaurant with Clare. He returned in series 9 for Hallam's funeral.
- George Green (Glen Murphy; series 1–14) – George had joined Blue Watch by the start of series 1. He was the longest-serving character on the show, appearing right up to the end of the final series, by which point he was the last remaining character from series 1. George was an unsubtle former boxer, sometimes with a short temper, and had old-fashioned views of women's roles in life. He dated Julia after convincing her that he was a talented poet and singer, with help from Malcolm and Sicknote, but she dumped him because he never trusted her. In series 3 he met Kelly at a ballroom dancing class. They married and had two children, although he frequently bickered with her mother and brothers. While working as a theatre fireman, George became infatuated with a ballet dancer from Russia but the relationship never got past kissing. He was shown to suffer from aerophobia when Blue Watch trained on the brigade helicopter in Series 8, but he managed to overcome his fear. He received his twenty-year service medal in Series 12. He and Kelly divorced when she had an affair with Temporary Station Officer Chris Hammond in series 12, and he married Andie in series 14. When the series ended, George was the only character remaining from episode 1 of series 1.
- Kevin Medhurst (Ross Boatman; series 1–8, series 12) – Kevin joined in series 1 and became a close friend of George. Kevin occasionally had problems with authority – his propensity to answer back or question orders led to him falling foul of his superiors. He clashed with Nick Georgiadis several times; when Kevin drunkenly insulted Nick's sister at his birthday party, Nick punched him. Kevin was from a troubled family – his father was in prison (once turning up at Blackwall at Christmas after escaping). Kevin's younger brother Micky caused him problems by making hoax calls to the station, and was later sent to prison for starting a fire. Micky returned in series 8, turning up at Kevin's houseboat and attacking Maggie at the station, after which Kevin disowned him for good. Kevin briefly dated Sally Reid, Vaseline's widow Marion, and Remy, who had moored her yacht next to Kevin's houseboat. After Remy left him without warning, a heartbroken Kevin packed his bags and left Blackwall. It was mentioned in Series 9 that he had taken a job at the Fire Brigade training centre at Southwark. Kevin returned in series 12 for Geoff Pearce's wedding.
- Tony Sanderson (Treva Etienne; series 1–3) – Tony was married to Dorothy, but the marriage had numerous problems, many caused by her being a shopaholic and the fact that it was an interracial marriage. Dorothy left him at the end of series 2. Tony subsequently met Jenny and left Blackwall after series 3 to run a boutique with her.
- Colin Parrish (Stephen North; series 3–6) – Colin was the nephew of Red Watch Fireman Jaffa Parrish and joined the watch as Vaseline's replacement. His naïvety and inexperience often made him the butt of pranks and jokes by other members of the watch. He took a liking to Firewoman Kate Stevens and visited her at her house, but was warned by Hallam to stop bothering her. After Colin sent the pump to the wrong address on a 'shout' (which was fortunately a hoax), Hallam extended Colin's probationary period, much to the ire of Colin's mother. Colin became a hero for the first time soon after this, when he saved another firefighter from falling down a lift shaft at a hotel fire. He graduated to full status early in series 5. He married Zoe, whom he met during a 'shout' (rescuing a bird from a cage after a fire in her neighbours' flat), despite her walking out on him after he took her to a Millwall match on their first date. Colin was invalided out of the brigade after his legs were crushed in Series 6.
- Kate Stevens (Samantha Beckinsale; series 3–5) – Kate joined the watch as Josie's replacement and she soon fitted in after rescuing a baby from a burning car. She met a volunteer fireman while the watch were on standby in Kent, but soon ditched him when it emerged his favourite pastime was rock climbing. Kate became a full-status firefighter in Series 4, which left Colin Parrish feeling bitter, since Hallam had extended his probationary period. During series 5 Kate met police officer Don, and got pregnant after a one-night stand. After she miscarried, she left Blackwall and transferred to Wimbledon so she could be closer to Don.
- Stuart 'Recall' MacKenzie (Ben Onwukwe; series 4–14) – Known as "Recall" due to having a photographic memory, he joined Blue Watch midway through series 4 as Tony Sanderson's replacement. He was a very effective firefighter, and acted as Leading Firefighter on several occasions. He was married to Laura and had two sons, Ben and Jamie, the latter of whom suffered from cystic fibrosis. Blue Watch held a fundraiser so he could take his family to Disney World, Florida. He was injured in the climax 'shout' of Series 4, and also in the Series 9 warehouse blaze where John Hallam was killed, but had lucky escapes on both occasions. Recall almost faced dismissal when he refused to shave off his beard, but the watch tied him up and shaved it off for him. He was elected as Blackwall's union rep in series 9. Recall was dismissed from the brigade in series 12 after allegedly assaulting a hotel manager, but he was later cleared and reinstated. He and Laura separated after he refused to move to Scotland with her and the children. He later met Elaine; they were due to marry, but Recall died of a heart attack the day before the wedding.
- Billy Ray (John Alford; series 6–10) – Billy joined Blue Watch in Series 6 as Kate Stevens' replacement. Billy was noted for his tendency to answer back to those whose rank was higher than his, and was often teased about his short height. He persuaded George to take up boxing again, with him as his trainer. Billy took over from Bayleaf as mess manager. He had a girlfriend named Lauren whom he met at a fire inspection in a strip club. In series 10, he was arrested on suspicion of murder after his half-sister's abusive boyfriend was found stabbed to death, but eventually cleared when she admitted killing him in self-defence. At the end of series 10, Billy took some leave after he found an abandoned baby in a toilet at a school (where a hoax call was initially made). The character departed with series 11 without explanation, as Alford was imprisoned for his role in supplying cocaine to what would be revealed as a drug sting instigated by a reporter for News of the World, and was terminated from the series upon conviction.
- Sally Reid (Sara Powell; series 6–7) – Sally was the watch's first female driver. She was very athletic and a strong swimmer. Her boyfriend, Eddie, was a drug dealer. She refused to continue their relationship, as her association with him led to her flat being raided by the police. She briefly got together with Kevin Medhurst, but they could not make it last. Sally left Blackwall to take care of her sick father.
- Jack Morgan (Clive Wood; series 9–11) – Jack joined Blue Watch in Series 9 as Bayleaf's replacement. At first Jack appeared taciturn and mysterious; rumours about his past abounded. It turned out that Jack had had a tragic experience at a previous station, when a colleague died after his BA cylinder ran out of air. Jack's testimony at the subsequent inquiry led to a Station Officer being dismissed. This made Jack sensitive to dangers and willing to abandon his duties to save a colleague. His previous career in the navy had also seen a tragedy, and after Hallam's death it led to him cruelly being described as a "Jonah" by some of the other firefighters, including Pitbull. Jack had been married to Linda, with whom he had a son named Stephen (played by Clive Wood's real-life son, Daniel Maiden-Wood), but they had since divorced and Linda had married Ian. As the series progressed Jack showed a more malevolent side and enjoyed winding up other watch members, which led to him and Recall coming to blows. Jack and Linda briefly re-kindled their passion but she left him when she realised she still loved her husband, Ian. Jack later had a nervous breakdown while on a shout but quickly recovered. Linda came to tell him that she was moving to America with Stephen and Ian; realising Stephen would have a better life over there than in London, Jack gave them his blessing. Jack quit Blackwall before series 12 to follow Stephen to the USA.
- Chris 'Skippy' Newman (Brad Clayton; series 9) Skippy joined Blue Watch in Series 9 as Kevin's replacement. He was born in Perth, Australia and as such was given the nickname 'Skippy' after Blue Watch held a raffle to decide his nickname. Good-natured and likeable, he helped talk down a young woman who was threatening to jump off a building. The next day, she turned up at Blackwall and gave him her phone number. He became friends with Billy Ray and took Billy in when he was beaten up. Skippy suffered serious injuries in the appliance crash at the end of series 9 and was forced to leave the brigade and moved back to Australia.
- Gregg Blake (Steven Houghton; series 10) Gregg hailed from Sheffield, and was a replacement for Skippy after the Watch's road accident in Series 9. He was an excellent singer and guitarist, and was very successful at a local talent night with his rendition of "Wind Beneath My Wings". He started going out with Tiggy, whom he met during a 'shout' at an art gallery when a faulty sprinkler system flooded the art gallery, and who turned out to be the daughter of an MP. While on standby at Upham Fire Station, Gregg accidentally set fire to the station by putting a circuit breaker back in place, without realising it had been removed because it was faulty. He eventually owned up when the watch were challenged about it, but before disciplinary action could be taken against him, he decided to leave the brigade. This decision came after he was injured in an explosion at a bus depot fire. Tiggy sat at his bedside in hospital and told him she could not bear to be with a man who one day might not get back from work.
- Sally 'Gracie' Fields (Heather Peace; series 11–14) – Sally joined Blue Watch in Series 11. She was late for work on her first day, which got her off on the wrong foot with Pearce, who was Acting Station Officer at the time. Sally became involved with Leading Firefighter Dan Barratt but she was more attracted to Joe Walker. Sally had a flatmate called Yvonne who had applied to join the brigade at the same time as Sally but was not accepted. This left her feeling bitter and jealous of Sally and she meddled in her life at Blackwall by trying to take advantage of Joe's crush on Sally and then sleeping with Temporary Station Officer Chris Hammond. Her behaviour left Sally furious and she and Yvonne parted company.
- Joe Walker (Jim Alexander; series 11–12) – Joe joined Blue Watch at the beginning of series 11, along with Dan Barratt and Sally Fields. He was attracted to Sally, and was jealous when she started going out with Dan. However, Sally and Dan split up, and she began a rocky relationship with Joe. He proved to be something of a homophobe when Hyper revealed that he was gay. He proposed to Sally near the end of Series 12, and she accepted his proposal on a 'shout', just as they were about to re-enter a blazing Chinese fireworks factory. Moments later, an explosion ripped through the building, killing Joe instantly.
- Ronnie 'Hi-Ho' Silver (Fuman Dar; series 12–13) Hi-Ho was initially a firefighter at Shadbrook Fire Station, where he crewed their Turntable Ladder appliance. During Series 12, while their station was being renovated, he worked on standby at Blackwall along with Carmen, the leading firefighter on his Watch. Hi-Ho joined Blue Watch permanently in Series 13, following the deaths of Joe Walker and Sicknote. He was frequently noted for his cheeky, mischievous humour. Hi-Ho was left devastated in Series 13, when he tried to rescue a girl from a flat fire and she died from her injuries. He considered resigning from the brigade, but Geoff Pearce found a way to change his mind. Pearce took Hi-Ho to a cemetery, where a huge plaque, dedicated to the London Fire Brigade, listed the names of many firefighters who had given their lives for their jobs. They also examined newer graves, which provided close-to-home examples of such bravery, in particular the graves of Joe, Sicknote, and Sub Officer John Hallam. Hi-Ho realised how many firefighters in the brigade would rather die than run away from pressure and tragedy, and he quickly withdrew his decision to resign. However, he had left Blackwall for unexplained reasons by the beginning of series 14.
- Adam Benjamin (Sam Callis; series 13–14) Adam joined Blue Watch in Series 13 as Sicknote's replacement. Already a veteran firefighter, he started out as Temporary Crew Commander, although this position was later handed to Sally Fields. Adam was very much a ladies' man – a trait which backfired on him in Series 14 after a girl he met in the pub drugged his drink and stole his wallet. He worked with Elaine Reeve in the Oliver Twist pub, later becoming a joint landlord with her. Elaine confessed that she was actually Adam's mother, and this led to complications in Adam's friendship with Recall, who had begun dating Elaine.
- Melissa Clark (Katy Odey; series 13) With Blue Watch for a short time.
- Charlie Mead (Terry Alderton; series 14) Charlie was a bit of a prankster and liked to have a laugh, although on certain occasions, he took it too far. Charlie part-owned a fish and chip shop with his brother Dom. The business proved problematic for both of them, as Dom did not feel that Charlie put enough time into the place while working as a firefighter as well.
- Frank Mooney (Tristan Gemmill; series 14) Frank was mysterious and liked to keep himself to himself. He never seemed to join-in with the Watch and was reminded by Station Officer Mick Callaghan that they should all work as a team. Frank proved to be a nasty piece of work and got involved with the criminal underworld and worked as a debt collector for Jimmy and ended up murdering a man. On every occasion possible, Frank tried to undermine Mick's authority on the watch and in his home life, having an affair with Mick's manic depressive wife, Shauna.
- Craig Ross (Leon Black; series 14) Craig arrived at Blackwall as Recall's replacement in Series 14, and was immediately subjected to pranks by the rest of the watch. The reality of the job hit him hard when he discovered his first dead body during a flat fire. He continued to have visions of the victim after the 'shout', which led to him crashing his car and ending up in hospital.
- Vernon 'Cling Film' Chivers (Chris Larner; series 8–12) Cling Film worked at Borough Street Fire Station, first appearing in Series 8. He was never a permanent member of Blue Watch, but frequently stood in for absent watch members. He was something of a loner who lived in his camper van on his driveway. Though essentially harmless, he was a bore whose nasal voice and nerdish demeanour made him a considerable irritant to those around him. He struck up a friendship with Geoff Pearce, who, like Cling Film, struggled to fit in with the watch. He had an ex-wife called Noreen, a religious extremist who was convinced that Cling Film was the "spawn of the devil". She set his camper van on fire and Blue Watch convinced him he should move in as Recall's lodger, much to the latter's chagrin. Noreen turned up at Recall's house and tied Cling Film and Geoff up and was threatening them with a kitchen knife until Recall came home and threw her out. Cling Film got into an argument on the fireground with Dan Barratt in Series 11 after Dan accused him of mishandling the hydraulic platform during a rescue. Although Cling Film and Geoff saw less of each other after Geoff and Fiona got together, he returned in series 12 for Geoff's stag night.

=== Other guest senior officers ===
- Assistant Chief Officer William Bulstrode (Gareth Thomas, 1989–1994) – Bulstrode was an archetypal Fire Officer who, like Station Officer Tate, saw himself as a "dinosaur" of the London Fire Brigade. Bulstrode was remembered for many significant incidents during his time as ACO. In series 2 he reprimanded Tate and Scase for a disagreement on a shout, when the Station Officer took charge of the incident from the ADO. Bulstrode privately agreed with Tate and transferred Scase away. In series 3, he led the investigation into an order given by Malcolm that led to Vaseline's death, but was quick to concur with the enquiry's recommendation of the minimum penalty – an informal warning. In the penultimate episode of series 4, Bulstrode took charge of a 20 pump incident from DACO Humble after Hallam and Bayleaf were buried alive when a wall collapsed on them. In series 5, he showed a sense of humour when Hallam conned Colin into believing he needed to submit a request form to Bulstrode for permission to get married. Though Nick Georgiadis disagreed with the prank, Bulstrode played along and gave Colin permission in front of the watch. In series 6, he was given a shock when he found out that Georgiadis was dating his daughter. This did not affect their professional standing and he offered Nick an Area Staff position which he turned down at the time. Bulstrode's final appearance came in series 7 when, before retiring, he personally told the now DO Scase what he really thought of him, by stating that Tate had been a real firefighter but that he had no idea what the paperwork-loving Scase was.
- Assistant Chief Officer Baxter (Roger Blake, 1995–1998) – Baxter was appointed as the new ACO in 1995 following Bulstrode's retirement. Baxter arrived at the position with the intent of modernising the area. He was instrumental in instigating the Blackwall firefighters' training for the brigade helicopter and for having Blue Watch's long-time nemesis DO Scase removed from his position.
- Divisional Officer Eddie Quinn (Mark Moraghan, 1995–1996) – Following Scase's reprimand and move sideways in 1995, Quinn was welcomed as a more approachable Divisional Officer and commanded a lot of respect from the firefighters at Blackwall. Quinn was an old friend of Station Officer Nick Georgiadis and supported the Blackwall governor through a difficult time after his fiancée Ariadne died and he struggled to adapt following the birth of his son Costas. DO Quinn was also remembered for dealing with the ordeal of Maggie being attacked by Kevin Medhurst's brother Mickey, in addition investigating Billy when he was injured on a Shout and playing a hands-on role in assisting the council in re-housing tenants from a fire hazardous property, during which he was also able to ensure the arrest of the landlord. Quinn was replaced by Chapman in 1996, but continued to remain in touch with Nick and was last mentioned in series 10, when he was up for a position with the fire service department within the Home Office.
- Divisional Officer Tom Chapman (Graham Sinclair, 1996–2001) (Later Senior Divisional Officer and ACO Chapman) – Chapman became DO in 1996 and was potentially considered the most hands-on and longest serving Divisional Officer. Like his predecessor DO Quinn, Chapman commanded a lot of respect from the team at Blackwall and was apparently good friends with Nick Georgiadis. Chapman supported the Watch through the events following the death of Sub Officer Hallam and in series 10 persuaded Nick to go for promotion to ADO. In series 11, Chapman intervened during a fire at a cinema, between ADO Georgiadis and Temporary Station Officer Hammond and ordered all crews out of the fire, but was unable to prevent Nick from going back into the cinema to save his fiancée Marianne and son Costas which led to his death. Following this Chapman gave a vote of confidence to Temporary Station Officer Hammond, but then retracted it following a discovery the latter was involved in illegal gambling. Before moving on to the position of Senior Divisional Officer, he gave the vote of confidence back to the Blue Watch Temporary Governor. In series 12, when now in the position of Acting Assistant Chief Officer, he agreed with the decision of now Station Officer John Coleman to pull the crew out of a blaze, over-ruling the orders of new Divisional Officer Griggs. The decision came too late, however, to prevent the deaths of firefighters Bert 'Sicknote' Quigley and Joe Walker. Chapman's last appearance came in series 13, now apparently the permanent ACO when he visited Blackwall to see Sally Fields after she was raped by Sean Bateman.
- Divisional Officer Griggs (Simon Merrells, 2000–2001) – DO Griggs was considered one of the more controversial senior officers during his tenure. He was originally appointed to investigate the allegation of assault by firefighter Stuart 'Recall' McKenzie to a hotel manager during a blaze. Griggs was a former watch rival at a station where he and Temporary Station Officer Chris Hammond had been placed. Following Chapman's departure on promotion, Griggs was appointed as the new Divisional Officer responsible for overseeing Blackwall, Borough Street and Charlton. In the final episode of series 12 Griggs gave an order for the blue team to continue with BA procedure during a fire, despite Station Officer John Coleman's objections, stating the team needed a rest. His orders were subsequently over-ruled by now Acting ACO Chapman; however, the order led to the death of firefighters Bert 'Sicknote' Quigley and Joe Walker. Griggs was cleared in the subsequent inquiry and he went on to investigate the assault by the Red Watch Commander on Firefighter Sally 'Gracie' Fields in series 13, and supported his subsequent dismissal and arrest.
- Assistant Divisional Officer Scase (Cliff Howells, 1989, 1994–1995) (Later Divisional Officer Scase) – Scase became Station Commander at Blackwall in series 2, having transferred from the North of England. He was highly unpleasant and abrasive, and his efforts to stamp discipline into the Watch made him unpopular. On a 'shout' at the Thames, Scase insisted on first making the area safe by having some loose scaffolding lashed, disregarding the fact that several trapped men would soon be drowned by the incoming tide. Tate finally lost his temper with the obnoxious Station Commander and took charge of the rescue himself, but not before angrily accusing Scase of being "inept" and "high and mighty". Scase reported Tate to HQ for insubordination, and both men were reprimanded for their actions by ACO Bulstrode. However, Bulstrode privately agreed with Tate's perspective, and had Scase transferred away from Blackwall. Scase returned in Series 7 as a Divisional Officer, using every excuse to make trouble for Blue Watch. His attitude only earned him a telling off from new ACO Baxter, who believed Scase's methods were as out-of-date as Scase had believed Tate and Bulstrode to be. Scase was not seen again after this, but it was mentioned that he had been reduced to a car park manager at HQ.
- Assistant Divisional Officer Patrick Davies (Douglas McFerran, 1997–1998) – ADO Davies was seen at Blackwall throughout series 10. He was a senior officer within the brigade's Health and Safety department, and was responsible for conducting a safety audit of Blackwall fire station. Davies knew Sub Officer Carole Webb, who had worked with the Health and Safety team prior to joining Blue Watch and tricked her into having an affair, after making her believe his marriage had ended. When Carole discovered the truth, she was able to blackmail him into signing a confession.
- Dave Grant (Barry McCormick; series 9) – Station Officer at nearby Charlton Fire Station. He was occasionally seen at shouts with Blue Watch. Grant was also known as a gossip. According to Nick Georgiadis: "[there are] 6000 firefighters in the Brigade, and Dave Grant thinks he knows everything about all of them, and what he doesn't know he makes up." Grant clashed with firefighter Jack Morgan after taunting Jack about being a Jonah.

=== Other recurring characters ===
- Marion Cartwright (Helen Blizard, 1986–1992) – Marion was Vaseline's third wife (and also the third named Marion), who married him in the movie. She frequently fought with Vaseline over his moonlighting and womanising, and was left to raise their son on her own after he was killed on a 'shout'. She later had relationships with Kevin Medhurst and Technique, but eventually decided she wanted to be get away from the brigade completely.
- Carmen Miller – (Nimmy March (Lady Naomi Gordon-Lennox), 2000) – Carmen was leading firefighter at Shadbrook Fire Station. She was sometimes seen at big shouts attended by Blackwall Blue Watch. Carmen wore sub-officer marking at the Hotel fire; however, when the TL was stationed at Blackwall, she wore the markings of a leading hand. Carmen led Shadbrook's bid to be named the best looking fire station in London, in competition with Blackwall. To gain an edge, Carmen loaned Blackwall toxic compost, which killed all their plants. In retaliation, Blackwall stole all Shadbrook's flowers. Along with Hi-Ho, she was stationed at Blackwall with the turntable ladder while Shadbrook was closed for appliance bay repairs. She also had a relationship with Dan Barratt.
- Raymond 'Pitbull' Darby – (Al Hunter Ashton, 1995–2001) – Pitbull was transferred to Red Watch, Blackwall, from Borough Street in Series 8 as Jaffa's replacement after he failed his medical. He was a loud mouthed serial bully, always making fun of other people's bad luck. He sometimes referred to Blue Watch as 'girls' or 'sisters'. He wanted to be Union Rep in Series 9, but lost out to Recall by one vote. He showed a rare streak of compassion for Sally Fields in Series 13 after the Red Watch Sub Officer, Sean Bateman, raped her at her flat.
- Donna (Paddy Navin, 1988–1989) – girlfriend of Charisma, who proved hard to move on.
- Marianne Frankel (Minna Aaltonen, 1996–1998) – Marianne was a member of the Dutch Fire Brigade who lusts after Nick 'Zorba' Georgiadis.
- Kelly Green (Vanessa Pett, 1990–2001) George Green's wife.
- Sandra Hallam (Kim Clifford, 1986–1997) – widow of John Hallam.
- Gary 'Technique' Pagnall (Craig Fairbrass, 1990–1992) – A bodybuilding-obsessed Blackwall firefighter who had an affair with Vaseline's widow Marion.
- Jaffa Parrish (Alan Talbot, 1988–2000) – Jaffa was a member of Red Watch at Blackwall, and the uncle of Colin Parrish. Jaffa had to leave the brigade in Series 7 after being injured on a 'shout' to a propane cylinder storage yard. He was with Blue Watch, standing in for George, and was in the pump when it was hit by a gas cylinder, badly burning him. Though he recovered, he was eventually taken off duty due to the trauma he had suffered. George felt guilty over the accident, but Jaffa dismissed his worries. He later took over as landlord of the Watch's favourite pub.
- Fiona Pearce (Helen Anderson, 1997–2002) – Fiona made her first appearance in Series 10 to test a new quieter siren on Blackwall's pump ladder. Geoff Pearce made friends with her and their relationship grew. They married in Series 12 and had a baby daughter named Eve in Series 13.
- Jean Quigley (Joanne Zorian, 1986; Amanda Dickinson, 1988–2000) – Jean was the long-suffering wife of pompous hypochondriac Bert "Sicknote" Quigley. Bert moved out of their house in Series 2, as he believed Jean was having an affair with Dominic, a member of their amateur dramatics group who outstripped Bert both in looks and talent. Bert was later in trouble with Jean for supposedly having an affair with another group member, Cynthia. On both occasions, they patched things up successfully. Jean became pregnant in Series 11, but had a miscarriage. To compensate for their grief, Bert suggested they should try fostering a child, which they did in Series 12.
- Dorothy Sanderson (Carol Harrison, 1988–1989) – Dorothy was married to Tony Sanderson. She was a persistent shopaholic, and Tony was frequently horrified at the amounts of useless shopping she would bring home.
- Nancy Tate (Yvonne Edgell, 1986–1990) – Sid Tate's wife and a LFB Control Centre dispatcher. She and Sid briefly fostered disabled child Paul shortly before Sid's forced retirement from the brigade.
- Maggie Warboys (Shirley Greenwood, 1988–2001) – Station cook. Motherly but flighty, Maggie was abandoned by her husband Albie and later appeared to take up with a young Thai man, before meeting her second husband, Derek, who took her surname.
- Clare Wilson (Valerie Holliman, 1989–1996) – Bayleaf's second wife.
- Linda (Sian Radinger, 1996–1998) – ex-wife of Jack Morgan.
- Elaine Reeve (Sharon Duce, 2001–2002) – Adam's mother and Recall's fiancée.
- Nicky Parrish (Katy Stephens, 1997–1998) – Jaffa Parrish's niece who came to work at his pub. He wasn't happy when she started having a relationship with Jack Morgan.
- Yvonne Bradley (Jane Hazlegrove, 1998) – Flatmate and best friend of firefighter Sally 'Gracie' Fields. She applied to join the London Fire Brigade at the same time as Sally but had been rejected, which made her resentful of Sally's success in the job. She also had an affair with Blackwall Station Officer Chris Hammond.
- Patti Pearce (Yvonne O'Grady, 1993–1996) – Geoff's first wife.
- Jacqui Parker (Sharon Gavin, 1998–2000).
- Evgenia Estafis (Sonia Graham, 1995–1997) – Mother of Ariadne, and grandmother of Nick Georgiadis's son Costas.
- Tiggy (Anouka Brook, 1997) – girlfriend of Firefighter Gregg Blake.
- Kate the LFB Call Centre Operator (Natalie Robb, 2001) – both Adam and Hi-Ho flirted with her.

== Locations ==
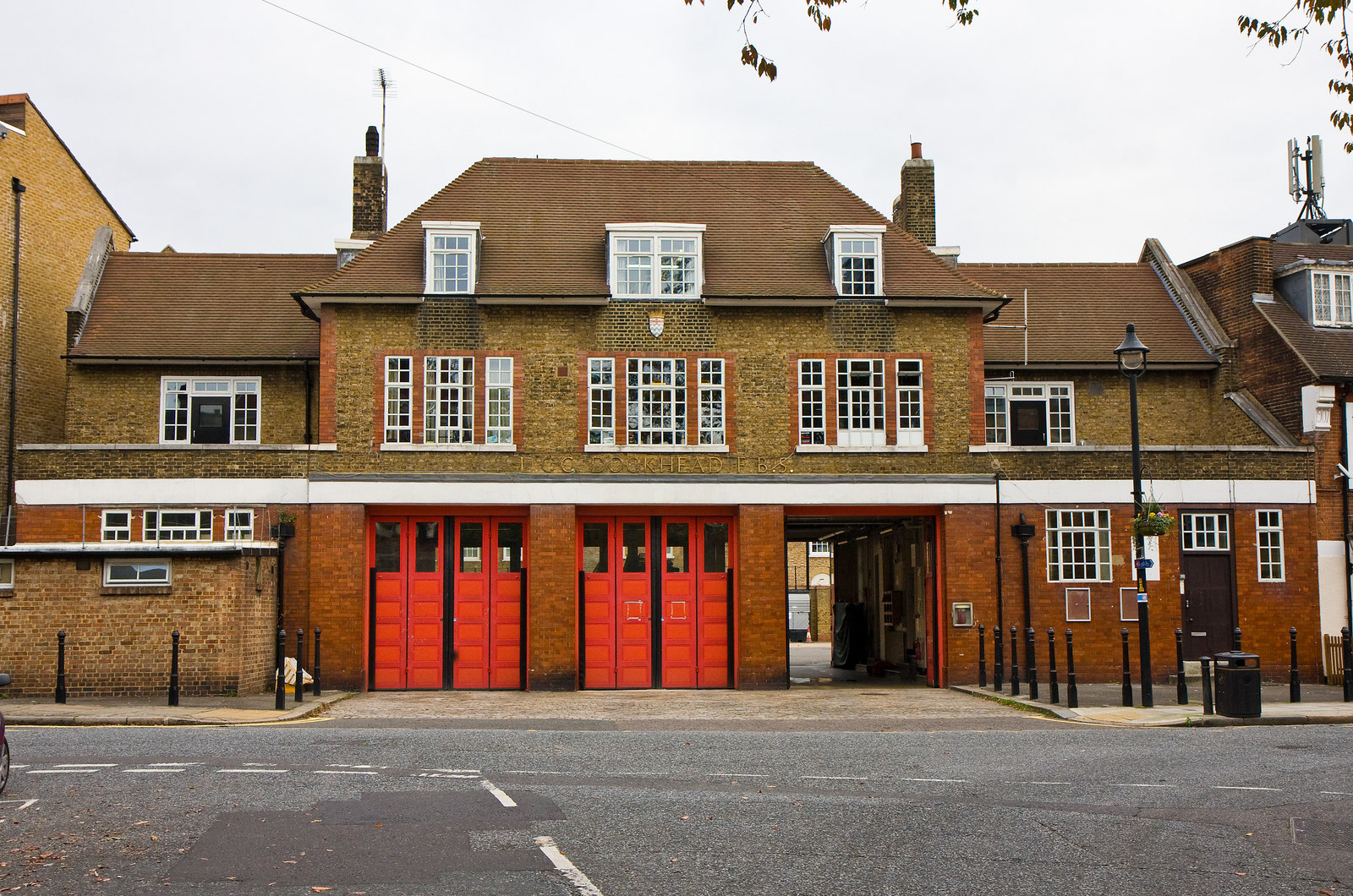
Dockhead Fire Station in 2010

The earlier series used Dockhead Fire Station (opened in the 1928) at 8 Wolseley Street, London SE1, as the exterior for Blackwall. The Jacob Street studio is opposite, housing a full scale reproduction of the mess, built by Colin Monk. The actual station mess was also used in the series, as were many other parts of the station and its actual firefighters.

To this day Dockhead is still an operational fire station, with just one pump ladder and the South East Area Command Unit (callsigned E341 & CU4), but the original station was demolished and rebuilt by the London Fire Brigade in 2016 to allow for the brigade's redevelopment and modernisation. The crew and pump ladder were temporarily located at the nearby Deptford Fire Station for the duration of the work, as Old Kent Road fire station (shown as Borough Street station in the series) was also being rebuilt. The Swan and Sugar Loaf pub, located opposite the station and which featured as the firefighters' local pub in the early series was converted into flats in the early 90s. This necessitated a move to The Ship Aground pub located next door to the station, which still exists to this day.

The location of the original fictional Blackwall fire station is about 800m from Tower Bridge but approximately 6 miles from the eponymous real life Blackwall. Locations used throughout the show were ostensibly filmed around the London postal district of SE16 at a time when the London Docklands Development Corporation were redeveloping the derelict areas of east and south east London. Notable filming locations include Chambers Wharf, Surrey Quays and Bermondsey.

The restaurant opened by Mike 'Bayleaf' Wilson in series 8 was filmed on location at The Chequers Inn, Deal, Kent.

From series 13 the original Blackwall station was revealed to have closed down and relocated. The final 2 series used the exterior of Leyton Fire Station and the Oliver Twist pub opposite. The new station location was far closer to the real London district of Blackwall than the previous set.

== DVD releases ==
All series of London's Burning were released between 2005 and 2011.

DVD Title	Disc No.	Year	No. of episodes	DVD release
DVD Title	Disc No.	Year	No. of episodes	Region 2
Series 1	3	1986, 1988	7 (5 + Pilot and Christmas Special)	23 May 2005
Series 2	2	1989	8	24 October 2005
Series 3	2	1990	8	10 July 2006
Series 4	3	1991	10	15 January 2007
Series 5	3	1992	10	6 August 2007
Series 6	3	1993	10	21 January 2008
Series 7	4	1994	15	14 April 2008
Series 8	4	1995	15	11 August 2008
Series 9	4	1996–1997	15	20 October 2008
Series 10	5	1997–1998	18	2 February 2009
Series 11	4	1998–1999	16	29 June 2009
Series 12	4	2000	16	25 January 2010
Series 13	4	2001	16	15 March 2010
Series 14	3	2002	8	31 May 2010
Series 1–7	20	1986, 1988–1994	68	19 October 2009
Series 8–14	28	1995–2002	104	4 April 2011

== See also ==
- Steel River Blues – another firefighting series mockingly dubbed "Middlesbrough's Burning" or "Teesside's Burning".
- The Smoke – British firefighter television drama
- Chicago Fire – American procedural drama
- The Bill – British police drama
- Casualty – British medical drama
