= Richard Walsh (actor) =

English actor (born 1952)

- Born: Richard Francis Evelyn Walsh; 8 December 1952 (age 73); Lewisham, London, England
- Occupation: Actor
- Years active: 1973–present
- Known for: Bert "Sicknote" Quigley in London's Burning
- Spouse: Sarah Keller (m. 1974)
- Children: 1

Richard Francis Evelyn Walsh (born 8 December 1952) is an English actor, best known for playing fireman Bert "Sicknote" Quigley in the long-running ITV drama series London's Burning from 1986 to the character's death in 2000. He has also appeared in other well-known British television shows, including Midsomer Murders, Doctors and Heartbeat. He also took part in a fire safety campaign in 1997 promoting smoke detectors. He was born in Lewisham, London, and is married to fellow actress Sarah Keller. They have one son, named James.
