= Trust Me (2007 film) =

- Directed by: Andrew Kazamia
- Written by: Andrew Kazamia
- Produced by: Liz Amsden; Caroline Haynes; Jon Haynes; Andrew Kazamia; Fran Kazamia; Peter G.A. Morris; Julie O'Neill; Ken Todd; Lisa Vanderpump; Mark Yellen
- Cinematography: Clive Tickner
- Edited by: Roger Dacier
- Production company: Quadriga Productions
- Distributed by: GatebreakR; Morningstar Entertainment; Phoenicia Pictures
- Release dates: June 2007 (Breckenridge Film Festival); March 17, 2008 (United Kingdom)
- Running time: 96 minutes
- Country: United States
- Language: English

Trust Me is a 2007 film written and directed by Andrew Kazamia.

The film was produced by Quadriga Productions and Lisa Vanderpump and Kenneth Todd. The film stars Enn Reitel, Tony Curran, Craig Ferguson, and Shelley Long. It won three awards at its first festival screening at the Breckenridge Festival of Film, June 2007, for Best Supporting Actor for Enn Reitel, Best Comedy and an Audiences Award. At the next festival, the Honolulu International Film Festival, July 2007, it won Best Director, then at the Kansas Universal Film Festival, September 2007, it won Best Director and Best Editor. It screened at the Braunschweig Film Festival in Germany where its director Andrew Kazamia won the Heinrich award for best first time European film maker 2007.

== Synopsis ==
Take a smart young con man and a talented but reluctant impressionist, let them loose among the natives in Hollywood.
