= Michael Garner =

English actor (born 1954)

- Born: Michael Gordon Garner; 15 October 1954 (age 72); Edmonton, London, England
- Occupation: Actor
- Years active: 1977–present

Michael Gordon Garner (born 15 October 1954) is an English theatre and television actor who is best known for playing Leading Firefighter/Sub Officer Geoffrey "Poison" Pearce in London's Burning between 1993 and 2002.

== Education ==
He was educated at Galliard Road Primary School, Edmonton and the King's School, Grantham. He gained a B.A. in Drama and English at Exeter University.

== Theatre ==
- A Tale of Two Cities (Northampton/national tour)
- Nell Gwynn (Apollo Theatre West End)
- Told Look Younger (Jermyn St Theatre)
- The Three Sisters (Southwark Playhouse)
- The Merry Wives of Windsor (Shakespeare's Globe)
- Michael Frayn's Alphabetical Order at Hampstead Theatre
- A Small Family Business (Watford Palace Theatre)
- Art (national tour)
- An Evening with Gary Lineker (Duchess Theatre)
- Roots (National Theatre)
- Sleeping Nightie (Royal Court Theatre)
- The Caucasian Chalk Circle (Young Vic)
- Educating Rita (Palace Theatre, Westcliffe)
- Hamlet (Oxford Playhouse and international tour)
- Rosencrantz and Guildenstern are Dead and Cider with Rosie (Oxford Playhouse Company)
- Unsuitable for Adults, W.C.P.C. (Liverpool Playhouse)
- Abigail’s Party, Accidental Death of an Anarchist, Ram Alley (Contact Theatre, Manchester)
- Absent Friends (Wolsey Theatre, Ipswich)
- The Merchant of Venice, Night and Day, Not Quite Jerusalem (Leeds Playhouse)
- Gothic Horrors (Shared Experience)
- Also seasons at the Library Theatre, Manchester and the Crucible Theatre, Sheffield.

== Television ==
- London's Burning (nine series as Leading Firefighter/Sub Officer Geoffrey Pearce)
- Other series include Vital Signs, Thin Air, EastEnders, Playing for Real, Spender and Thacker. Also Doc Martin, Holby City, Doctors, Down to Earth, Heartbeat, The Nation’s Health, Casualty, Brookside, Barriers, Struggle, Coronation Street, Minder, The Bill, Baby Talk, The Chief, Van der Valk, Earth Warp and Goodnight Sweetheart.

== Film ==
Year	Title	Role	Notes
1983	Shore Patrol	Leading Cook Fenner	
1999	Rogue Trader	Alec Sims	
2011	The Merry Wives of Windsor	Master Page	
2013	Legend 17	Kanadskiy zhurnalist	

== Music ==
Garner appears in the Ellie Goulding video for "How Long Will I Love You?" as the man she kisses in the car park while undertaking a series of pranks.

== Personal life ==
Garner lives in London with his partner Paula Hamilton and their two children.

He has run the London Marathon six times for the Leukemia Research charity.
