= Andrew Kazamia =

Cypriot actor (born 1953)

- Born: 1953 (age 72–73); Cyprus
- Occupations: Actor; writer; director

Andrew Kazamia is a Cypriot actor, writer and director.

== Career ==
He has written and directed Trust Me, the 2007 film starring Cory Prendergast, Enn Reitel, Tony Curran and Shelley Long. It won three awards at its first festival screening at the Breckenridge Festival of Film, June 2007: Best Supporting Actor for Enn Reitel, Best Comedy and an Audiences Award. At the next festival, the Honolulu International Film Festival, July 2007, it won Best Director, then at the Kansas Universal Film Festival, September 2007, it won Best Director and Best Editor. It screened at the Braunschweig Film Festival in Germany where Andrew Kazamia won the Heinrich award for first time European film makers.

He is also best known for his role as Station Officer/Assistant Divisional Officer Nick 'Zorba' Georgiadis in the TV series London's Burning from 1991-1998.
