= Staying Alive (TV series) =

British television medical drama series

- Genre: Medical drama
- Written by: Neil McKay; Sam Snape; Helen Slavin; Louise Berridge
- Directed by: David Skynner; Joanna Hogg; James Hawes; Keith Boak
- Starring: Jessica Hynes; Amanda Royle; Susannah Wise; Paul Higgins; Sophie Okonedo; Jenny Bolt; Sean Blowers; Ayub Khan Din; Tom Beard
- Opening theme: "Coming Around Again" by Carly Simon
- Ending theme: "Coming Around Again" by Carly Simon
- Composer: Warren Bennett
- Country of origin: United Kingdom
- Original language: English
- No. of series: 2
- No. of episodes: 12

Production
- Executive producer: Sally Head
- Producer: Louise Berridge
- Production locations: Mapperley Hospital, Nottingham, England, UK; London, England, UK
- Running time: 50 minutes
- Production company: LWT

Original release
- Network: ITV
- Release: 1 November 1996 – 3 August 1997

Staying Alive is a British television medical drama series written and created by Neil McKay, first broadcast on ITV and that aired between 1 November 1996 and 3 August 1997. The series, which follows a group of student nurses working in a London hospital, starred Jessica Hynes, Amanda Royle and Susannah Wise in the title roles, alongside Paul Higgins, Sophie Okonedo, Jenny Bolt, Sean Blowers and Ayub Khan Din. Co-produced and partially filmed in London, Staying Alive was one of the first ITV dramas to be co-produced between LWT and an international production company.

Across two series, a total of twelve episodes were broadcast. Episodes were broadcast at 9:00pm on Fridays as part of LWT's new-look slate of British drama. For the second series, a number of new regular cast members were introduced, including Ian Fitzgibbon, Susan McArdle and Rupert Procter. In 1996, a docudrama series with the same name aired on Channel 4, following the lives of six people from different countries around the world infected by the HIV virus. Subsequently, there was some confusion as several TV listings magazines confused the two programmes in the listings guide.

== Cast ==
- Jessica Hynes as Alice Timpson
- Amanda Royle as Dr. Sue McPherson
- Susannah Wise as Dr. Michaela Lennox
- Paul Higgins as Alan McPherson
- Sophie Okonedo as Kelly Booth
- Jenny Bolt as Cassandra Naylor
- Sean Blowers as Sgt. Gordon Naylor (Series 1)
- Ayub Khan Din as Dr. Suni Rai
- Tom Beard as Dr. Miles Vincent
- Lynne Verrall as Sister Felicity O'Keefe
- Lesley Nicol as Sister Kate Worswick
- Liz Kettle as Sister Fran Coulson
- Caroline Hunnisett as Sister Annette Ayers (Series 1)
- Yonic Blackwood as Staff Nurse Brigid Watters (Series 1)
- Karl Draper as Christopher Morrison
- Scott Ransome as Philip Curtis (Series 1)
- Charlotte Emmerson as Helen Curtis (Series 1)
- Ian Fitzgibbon as Martin Roebuck (Series 2)
- Susan McArdle as Nikki Salvani (Series 2)
- Rupert Procter as Danny Collins (Series 2)
- Claudette Barnard as Margaret Timpson
- Heather Tobias as Barbara Dawlish (Series 1)

== Episodes ==
=== Series overview ===
Series	Episodes	Originally released	
Series	Episodes	First released	Last released
1	6	1 November 1996	6 December 1996
2	6	29 June 1997	3 August 1997

=== Series 1 (1996) ===
No.	Title	Directed by	Written by	British air date
1	"The Good Doctor"	Keith Boak	Neil McKay	1 November 1996
2	"Dark Virus"	Keith Boak	Neil McKay	8 November 1996
3	"Maddening Revenge"	James Hawes	Neil McKay	15 November 1996
4	"Curing the Health"	James Hawes	Neil McKay	22 November 1996
Kelly is forced to face the music about her brother's accident. Michaela trashes Kelly's room, but is caught red-handed by Christopher, and she later admits to Kelly that Alan has a secret lovechild and has had many previous affairs. Felicity is suspicious when Alice and Suni arrive at work together.
5	"The Blood that Flows"	David Skynner	Neil McKay	29 November 1996
Michaela continues to struggle with the knowledge of Alan's affair with Kelly. The atmosphere between Philip and Helen worsens after the fitting of his artificial leg. Alice is thrilled when Vincent asks her out for dinner. Cassandra arranges to meet Gordon to talk about their divorce, and discovers that he is optimistic they might get back together.
6	"Bad Medicine"	David Skynner	Neil McKay	6 December 1996
Michaela continues to confide in Peter about Alan and Chris, but realises he is showing signs of recovery. Kelly tells Alan that she is going to have an abortion, but Alan begs her to reconsider. Having spent the night together, Cassie and Gordon look as though they may patch up their marriage. During the summer barbecue, Michaela makes her excuses and pays Peter a visit.

=== Series 2 (1997) ===
No.	Title	Directed by	Written by	British air date
1	"The Return"	David Skynner	Neil McKay	29 June 1997
2	"Placebo is Bigger Than Before"	David Skynner	Sam Snape	6 July 1997
3	"To Heal the Demon"	Joanna Hogg	Helen Slavin	13 July 1997
4	"The High Artery"	Joanna Hogg	Neil McKay	20 July 1997
5	"Be Clear on Cancer"	David Skynner	Helen Slavin	27 July 1997
6	"The End of Life"	David Skynner	Neil McKay and Louise Berridge	3 August 1997

== Home media ==
Notably, the series has never been commercially released on VHS or DVD.
