= Sean Blowers =

English actor (born 1961)

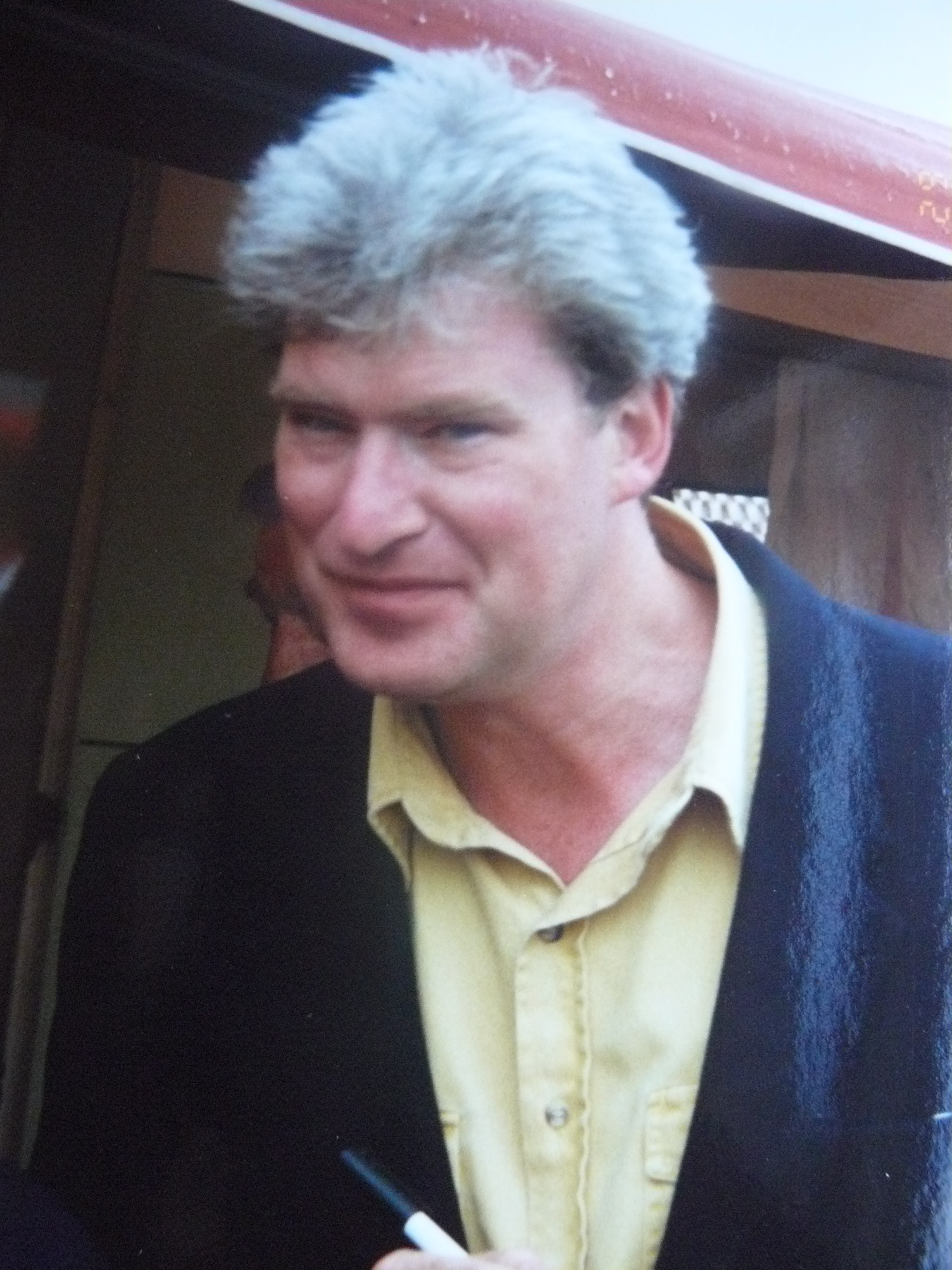
- Born: Sean Anthony Blowers; 26 January 1961 (age 65); Middlesbrough, North Riding of Yorkshire, England, UK
- Years active: 1980s–present
- Spouse: Shirley (m. 1985)

Sean Anthony Blowers (born 26 January 1961) is an English actor.

Blowers was born in Middlesbrough, North Riding of Yorkshire. He is best known for playing John Hallam in London's Burning from 1986 until the character was killed off in 1996. He has also been in The Bill, A Touch of Frost, Dalziel and Pascoe, Heartbeat, New Tricks, Casualty, Staying Alive, Crossroads, Doctor Who, EastEnders and has appeared in films such as The Krays, Black Beauty and First Knight.

In 2016, he joined the cast of the HBO series Game of Thrones in "The Winds of Winter", the finale of Season 6 as Wyman Manderly.
