= Close to Home (1989 TV series) =

1989 British television series

- Genre: Sitcom
- Created by: Brian Cooke
- Directed by: Nic Phillips (1989); Ian Hamilton (1989–1990); Alistair Clarke (credited as Alistair Clark in 1990)
- Starring: John Arthur; Lucy Benjamin; Jane Briers; Angela Curran; Stephen Frost; Pippa Guard; Paul Nicholas; Andrew Read; Angharad Rees
- Theme music composer: Brian and Warren Bennett
- Opening theme: "Close to Home"
- Country of origin: United Kingdom
- Original language: English
- No. of series: 2
- No. of episodes: 19

Production
- Executive producers: Marcus Plantin (1989); Robin Carr (1990)
- Production locations: North London, England
- Running time: 30 minutes (including adverts)
- Production company: LWT

Original release
- Network: ITV
- Release: 1 October 1989 – 18 November 1990

Related
- Starting from Scratch (1988–1989)

Close to Home is a British television sitcom created by Brian Cooke, and made by LWT. Two series were originally broadcast on ITV in the United Kingdom between 1 October 1989 and 18 November 1990.

Set in North London, it starred Paul Nicholas as vet and divorced father of two, James Shepherd, Angharad Rees as his ex-wife Helen DeAngelo, and Jane Briers as quirky veterinary nurse Rose. James and Helen's 19-year-old daughter Kate was played in both series by Lucy Benjamin. Their 14-year-old son Robbie was played by Andrew Read.

Each episode featured James Shepherd's attempts to juggle life as the single father of two teenagers, while running a busy veterinary practice. His attempts to find happiness with a new partner were frequently sabotaged by clingy ex-wife Helen.

Actor and comedian Stephen Frost was a regular guest star during series one, playing Helen DeAngelo's Italian second husband Frank. In series two, actress Pippa Guard joined the cast as James' on-off love interest, Vicky.

== Synopsis ==
James Shepherd (Paul Nicholas), a 40-something vet and divorced father of two, lives in north London with his two teenage children. His veterinary practice is based in his home, with the result that he finds it impossible to escape the dual pressures of fatherhood and running his business. In his surgery, James is assisted by cat-hating veterinary nurse Rose (Jane Briers), who is almost part of the family.

James is divorced from Helen (Angharad Rees) after 14 years of marriage. Initially, she had custody of their children, but when Helen remarried, 19-year-old Kate (Lucy Benjamin) and 14-year-old Robbie (Andrew Read) moved back in with their father.

Helen still holds a flame for James, and to his infuriation frequently visits to meddle in his affairs and generally check up on him. Her Italian husband Frank (Stephen Frost) is becoming equally annoyed with his new wife's ways.

In series one, the situation focuses primarily on the domestic difficulties James faces, bringing up teenage children as a single father while dealing with a clingy and unpredictable ex-wife. The sitcom-staple storylines included James' children trying to fix him up with a blind date ("Double Date"), his daughter being stood up by her boyfriend ("Kate's Broken Heart") and Helen's elderly father falling for a 20-something musician ("Helen's Parents").

In series one, James' work as a vet served to provide sub-plots featuring cute animals which would appeal to a family audience and inject comedic caricature pet owners. In series two, James' work provided the catalyst for the introduction of new love interest Vicki (Pippa Guard), who runs a local city farm.

Throughout the second series, James has an on-off relationship with Vicky. Recently widowed, she initially finds James infuriating, particularly when he lets a ram loose in a field of ewes at her farm, crashes his Range Rover into her car and accidentally covers her in profiteroles. Meanwhile, having discovered that new husband Frank is having an affair with a 22-year-old in Italy, Helen harbours hopes of a reconciliation with James, and does her best to derail his relationship with Vicky at every opportunity.

While series one had concentrated on comedy derived from domestic family situations, the recurring theme of James and Vicky's relationship formed the backbone of series two. Storylines often featured farcical misunderstandings. For example, in "Mum's the Word", Vicki thinks her dog is pregnant, James believes it is his daughter Kate who is pregnant while his children mistakenly convince Helen that Vicky is the pregnant one. In "Guess Who's Coming to Dinner?", Kate and Robbie mistakenly believe their father wants to take Helen to a dinner dance, when he is actually meeting a blind date. Unbeknownst to him, Vicky is also at the event.

As the series progresses, their on-off, love-hate relationship slowly becomes closer. James and Vicky learn to respect each other, and realise how similar they really are. In the last episode of series two, "While the Vet's Away...", James persuades Vicky to accompany him for a weekend in the Cotswolds. However, James has forgotten to confirm their hotel booking and so is forced to return with Vicky to the Shepherd family home. Here, they unexpectedly find Kate partying with her college friends, Robbie enjoying a video night with school friends and Rose holding a murder mystery re-enactment evening. As usual, events conspire against the couple and their relationship remains unresolved.

James' and Vicky's storyline in series two relegated the importance of the weekly surgery comedy caricature cameos, and also eclipsed the character of Rose. She became a clownish figure who would invariably enter at unforeseen moments, wearing outlandish costumes which related to her almost mythical past experiences.

Close to Home delivered few belly-laughs, but provided gentle, inoffensive comedy aimed squarely at a Sunday evening family audience. The situations in each episode were not always intrinsically funny and indeed sometimes tackled sensitive issues, ranging from animal euthanasia to teenage pregnancy. The central character of James Shepherd merely reacts to the situations he finds himself in. However, veterinary nurse Rose was an inspired comic creation. A weekly running gag had her revealing a new and more unlikely revelation about her character's back-story in each episode. Further character-led humour came from the charmingly naive, yet irrepressible Helen who believed she was always right, and reformed thug Frank whose character was nicely at odds with the otherwise cosy feel of this sitcom.

Scenes would frequently end with a sharp one-liner delivered by Kate or Robbie, and their banter often included inspired put-downs directed at each other. In the surgery, James' clients comprised comic caricature pet owners who often looked and acted like the animals they accompanied. These cameos were played with aplomb by a succession of familiar bit-part comedy actors, who often delivered some of the funniest scenes of each episode.

== Production ==
Close to Home is based on creator Brian Cooke's U.S. sitcom Starting from Scratch. While living and working in the United States, Cooke developed the idea for Starting from Scratch, and a single season, comprising 23 episodes, was made and aired in the U.S. between 1 October 1988 and 27 May 1989.

With production of Starting from Scratch underway, Cooke returned to the UK to oversee the creation of Close to Home, which was produced by the ITV London weekend franchise holder LWT, in association with the U.S. distributor Worldvision Enterprises.

Close to Home's central characters shared the same names as their American counterparts, the interior set design of the Shepherd's house was almost identical and many of the scripts for the nine episodes in Close to Home's first series were largely based on Brian Cooke's storylines for the U.S. version.

While all but two of the episodes in the first series had been written by creator Brian Cooke, he was not to pen any of the ten episodes in series two and was credited only as the series' creator. The majority of the second series episodes were written by Paul Minettand Brian Leveson. The first series was produced by Nic Phillips with the second series produced by Ian Hamilton.

With a new writing team, producer and executive producer in place, Close to Home's second series dispensed with the recurring character of Helen's new husband Frank. Instead, Pippa Guard was cast as James Shepherd's love interest, Vicky. While most episodes in series one had featured self-contained storylines, James and Vicki's on-off relationship provided a running theme throughout the second series. The first series had been entirely based in the Shepherd household, but this storyline required a substantial amount of location filming at the city farm which Guard's character ran.

== Main characters ==
James Shepherd (Paul Nicholas) – A forty-something, single father of two teenagers who has his own veterinary practice specialising in the treatment of domestic pets. A likeable everyman, James is divorced from Helen, his wife of 14 years, but has retained the family home because his surgery is on-site. Following his ex-wife's remarriage, James has custody of his two children, although they lived with their mother for three years immediately after the divorce.

James is unlucky in love. While having a warm heart and generous nature (he seldom seems to charge customers for his services as a vet), his sharp wit is sometimes taken the wrong way by prospective girlfriends and clients. He struggles to balance bringing up his two children with the pressure of running his own surgery, and matters are not helped by the constant meddling of his ex-wife.

James has become used to being single and craves a quiet life, unhindered by the stresses which a relationship can bring. The course of true love does not run smoothly therefore when in series two, he finds himself attracted to headstrong widow, Vicky.

Helen DeAngelo (Angharad Rees) – Helen married James when they were both very young, and claims that of the 14 years of marriage they shared, the first seven were great. Despite having remarried, she still carries a flame for James and cannot abide the thought of him settling down with anyone else. She is particularly cold towards James' love interest Vicky throughout series two.

Helen lives in Hampstead, close to James and her children. Being somewhat of a busy-body, she constantly visits them to keep abreast of the family gossip and keep a watchful eye on James' love life.

Helen considers herself to be highly artistic and since remarrying has set up an interior design business. She has little concept of the value of money, and was clearly difficult to be married to. However, she and James retain a warm friendship.

Rose (Jane Briers) – James' veterinary nurse and assistant Rose is in the wrong job; she hates cats! However, in the past she's led a life filled with adventure and her tales never cease to amaze the Shepherd family. A running gag revolves around Rose revealing a new and unlikely past-life in every episode. She has variously mentored Elton John, lived with a Native American tribe, worked as a snake charmer and been married five times. Her hobbies range from skydiving to martial arts. Much of the comedy came from the sparkling rapport between Nicholas and Briers.

Kate Shepherd (Lucy Benjamin) – 17-year-old college student Kate still lives at home with her father and younger brother. On the cusp of adulthood, she's eager to leave home and be viewed by her parents as a grown-up. She cannot abide her brother and frequently puts him down with wickedly sarcastic remarks. However, in a family crisis, she will always pull together with other family members. In the first series episode "Kate's Broken Heart", she is madly in love with the captain of her college's football team. However, this storyline was not pursued in future episodes.

Robbie Shepherd (Andrew Read) – Robbie is a very young-looking 14-year-old, who to his despair is frequently reminded by his sister and parents that he is the youngest in the family. However, his youthful looks belie the fact that Robbie is a smooth operator who has a slick way with words. He mercilessly teases Kate, makes money from his family members whenever possible and is adept at talking his way out of trouble. He is beginning to get interested in girls and worries that he does not yet have a girlfriend. Robbie hopes to make his father proud by following in his footsteps and becoming a vet.

Frank DeAngelo (Stephen Frost – Series one only) – Frank is Helen's second husband. A rather questionable Italian businessman from Rome, Frank has a shady past. Powerfully built, Frank is not afraid to intimidate people. Luckily, he and James get on well. Having married Helen, he is beginning to realise why her quirky ways made her marriage to James fail. There is mutual respect between the two men because of this shared experience, and Frank sometimes envies the freedom which James has as a single man. The character of Frank was written out in series two. He returns to Italy on business, where Helen learns he is having an affair with a 22-year-old.

Vicky (Pippa Guard – Series two only) – Vicky runs a city farm close to James' veterinary practice. Recently widowed, she is struggling to keep the farm going. Headstrong and not afraid to speak her mind, Vicky does not suffer fools. She meets James for the first time during the opening episode of series two "As One Door Opens...", when James accidentally lets a ram loose into a field of ewes at her farm. Sparks soon fly between them, but a series of coincidences conspire to constantly bring the two together. An on-off relationship develops between James and Vicky throughout the second series, culminating in an abortive weekend away. The cancellation of Close to Home after two series meant that their on-off relationship was never resolved.

Tom (John Arthur – Series two only) – Tom is an old friend of James. Also a vet, he regularly looks after the animals at Vicky's city farm and is frequently caught in the middle of the arguments between James and Vicky. Dramatically, the character served mainly as a device to allow Vicky and James to express their feelings concerning one another in dialogue to an impartial, third person.

Jenny (Angela Curran – Series two only) – Jenny works as Vicky's assistant at the city farm. Again, this character served mainly to provide a device to allow Vicky to express her feelings about James in dialogue.

== Episodes ==
Nineteen half-hour episodes of Close to Home were broadcast on ITV between 1 October 1989 and 18 November 1990. The nine episodes in series one were originally broadcast from 7:15pm, every Sunday evening between 1 October and 26 November 1989. The ten episodes in series two were also broadcast from 7:15pm every Sunday evening, between 16 September and 18 November 1990. Every episode was recorded at the London Television Centre in front of a live studio audience.

Series	Episodes	Originally released	
Series	Episodes	First released	Last released
1	9	1 October 1989	26 November 1989
2	10	16 September 1990	18 November 1990

=== Series 1 (1989) ===
No. overall	No. in series	Title	Directed by	Written by	Original release date
1	1	"Father and Family"	Nic Phillips	Brian Cooke	1 October 1989
2	2	"The Contract"	Nic Phillips	Brian Cooke	8 October 1989
3	3	"Double Date"	Nic Phillips	Brian Cooke	15 October 1989
Robbie and Kate are keen for their father to start dating again. Robbie decides to sign James up to a computer dating agency, while Kate contacts one of his old flames. When they both arrange a date for him on the same night, James is left in an awkward situation. Luckily, one of James' dates turns out to be an old school friend of Helen's, and the other has been signed up to the computer dating agency by her daughter. James is pleased to be let off the hook.
4	4	"The Horse Race"	Nic Phillips	Ken Steele	22 October 1989
5	5	"Helen's Parents"	Nic Phillips	Ken Steele	29 October 1989
James is angered when Helen invites her parents to stay at his house. When her father arrives with a 20-something fiancé who he has only met that morning on the train, it is down to James to break the news to Helen and her mother.
6	6	"She's Leaving Home"	Nic Phillips	Brian Cooke	5 November 1989
Following an argument, Kate decides to leave home.
7	7	"A Matter of Decree"	Nic Phillips	Brian Cooke	12 November 1989
James, Helen and Franks' marital status is called into question when a solicitor arrives with the news that Helen and James' divorce might not have been finalised. Frank reacts with glee at the possibility he might not be married to Helen after all, and is perhaps a free man, but Helen is furious. The situation is resolved when the solicitor finally finds the Decree Absolute, but can Frank and Helen's marriage be saved?
8	8	"Katie's Broken Heart"	Ian Hamilton	Brian Cooke	19 November 1989
Kate is devastated when her boyfriend, the captain of the college football team, stands her up the day before her rag week dance. She is convinced that he wants to take someone else. He finally finds the courage to confess that he cannot face going to the dance because he has failed his college year, and they are reconciled.
9	9	"Helen the Receptionist"	Ian Hamilton	Brian Cooke	26 November 1989
When Rose is unable to work, Helen offers to stand-in as James' receptionist. Can the divorced couple work together, or will it be as bad as being married?

=== Series 2 (1990) ===
No. overall	No. in series	Title	Directed by	Written by	Original release date
10	1	"As One Door Opens..."	Ian Hamilton	Paul Minett & Brian Leveson	16 September 1990
James and his family visit a city farm, with disastrous results. This episode introduced the characters Vicky, Tom and Jenny.
11	2	"Guess Who's Coming to Dinner?"	Ian Hamilton	Paul Minett & Brian Leveson	23 September 1990
James is going to the annual vets' dinner-dance and his colleague Tom fixes him up with a blind date. But matters do not turn out as planned.
12	3	"Fete Takes a Hand"	Alistair Clark	Paul Minett & Brian Leveson	30 September 1990
It is time for the annual fete again and Vicky has been roped in to help – much against her will. However, events do not run smoothly, so James invites Vicky to dinner as a peace offering.
13	4	"Council of War"	Ian Hamilton	Paul Minett & Brian Leveson	7 October 1990
When an unscrupulous councilor tries to close down Vicky's farm, James, Kate and Robbie decide to take stern action.
14	5	"Square Pegs"	Alistair Clark	Alex Shearer	14 October 1990
An enthusiastic trainee starts work at the surgery, and Robbie confronts a moral dilemma at school.
15	6	"Mum's the Word"	Ian Hamilton	Lucy Flannery	21 October 1990
Is there going to be a new addition to the Shepherd family? Robbie thinks so, and spreads the word.
16	7	"Motor Madness"	Alistair Clark	Lucy Flannery	28 October 1990
Kate is taking her driving test, and James has promised her a new car if she passes. But where is he going to find the money to pay for it?
17	8	"And Then...There Was One!"	Ian Hamilton	Paul Minett & Brian Leveson	4 November 1990
Rose announces that she is emigrating. Helen is to be reconciled with her errant husband Frank. Is this the end of the Shepherd household?
18	9	"The Night the Earth Moved"	Alistair Clark	Jack Huffham	11 November 1990
With slates flying off the roof, trees falling down and a hurricane blowing outside, James' plans for a quiet evening with Vicky stand no chance at all.
19	10	"While the Vet's Away..."	Ian Hamilton	Paul Minett & Brian Leveson	18 November 1990
James goes away with Vicky for a romantic weekend. When his plans go wrong, he returns home to find more than he bargained for.

== Theme music and titles ==
Father and son team Brian and Warren Bennett wrote the original theme tune and incidental music for both series of Close to Home. The eponymous opening title theme was sung by Paul Nicholas.

The opening titles of series one feature a series of stop motion animated household ornaments which each dissolve to reveal a principal cast member, who is then named with a caption. The titles end with a static shot of a tea set and a mouse unexpectedly pops its head up from inside a tea cup.

For series two, these titles were replaced with a more modern CGI sequence featuring each principal cast member superimposed in front of a dark blue background, with various pets passing through frame behind them, laughing. Again, the cast members' names were displayed.

The series one closing credits featured a traditional vertical roller of cast and crew names, against a static background of the tea set as featured in the opening titles. The series two credits again used a vertical credit roller against the opening titles background, this time without cast members super-imposed, but still with animals passing through frame.
