= Warren Bennett (musician) =

British composer (born 1962)

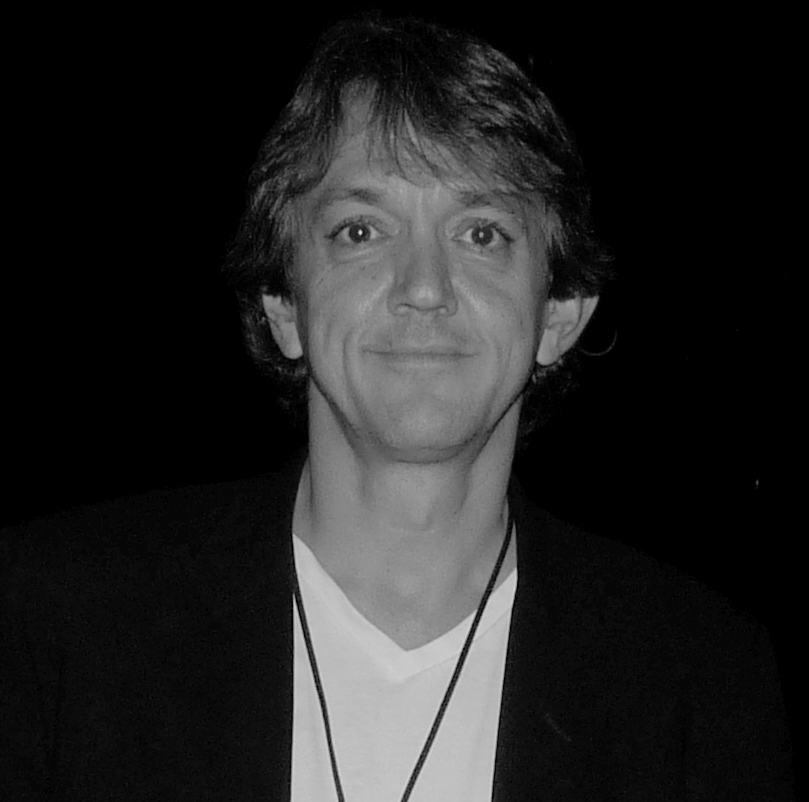

Background information
- Born: 4 July 1962 (age 63)
- Origin: Hertfordshire, England
- Genres: Rock; instrumental; film and television score
- Occupations: Musician; composer
- Instruments: Keyboards; guitar
- Years active: 1980s–present
- Formerly of: Glass Ties, The Vibratos, The Shadows
- Website: soundcloud.com/warren-bennett

Warren Bennett (born 4 July 1962) is an English musician, composer and performer. He was educated at Mill Hill School and is the son of Brian Bennett, the Shadows' drummer. He played keyboards on tour with the Shadows on their farewell tours from 2004 till 2015, with and without one-time front man Cliff Richard. Warren's professional musical career began in 1977 when, aged 15, his first composition for television was used for ITV's Summer Promotional Campaign. Also that year he co-wrote "The Girls Back Home", which was released as a single from the Rock Dreams album by the Brian Bennett Band. This initial success, especially in television, led to him becoming not only an accomplished musician, writer and producer (with more than 70 albums) but also as an established composer for feature films.

== Music credits ==
His feature credits include: Chaos and Cadavers, the black comedy for Matador Pictures starring Keeley Hawes, Rik Mayall and Nick Moran; Wuthering Heights (starring Robert Cavanah and Sarah Smart); Dear Roy, Love Gillian and Access Hollywood (USTV Film). He has also composed and performed the title songs for The American Way (starring Dennis Hopper), The Harpist (Schlemmer Films), and Ruth Rendell's classic dramas, Some Lie and Some Die and Decadence (starring Steven Berkoff and Joan Collins).

== Television credits ==
Television credits include: New Tricks 2007–2015 (BBC series), Can't Buy Me Love (ITV drama), The Knock (LWT 12 x 60mins Drama Series and 4 x 90min specials), Staying Alive (LWT 12 x 60mins Drama Series), Dirty Work (BBC Drama Series), The Ambassador (BBC 6 x 60mins Drama Series), London's Burning (LWT 48 x 60mins Drama Series), Birds of a Feather (BBC Christmas specials) and Close To Home (LWT Series). He recently arranged, produced and performed the music for Moonpower (BBC).

Bennett has also written more than 60 library music albums, from which his music can be heard on such TV programmes as: Buffy the Vampire Slayer, ER, The Osbournes, Murder One, Friends, America's Most Wanted, The Chris Isaak Show, The Fast Show, SpongeBob SquarePants, Baywatch, Ellen, The Cosby Show, Bergerac, Taggart, Spitting Image, Oprah Winfrey and Beavis & Butthead.

== Early career ==
As a performer, Bennett's career began in 1980, when his group Glass Ties were signed to EMI Records. During this period, they released two singles and toured extensively. This then led to Bennett's first association with the Shadows when he co-wrote "You Rescue Me" for their Life in the Jungle album. As a solo artist, Bennett had a year-long stint as support act for Alan Price's 1984 UK tour.

== Collaborations ==
Bennett has also released two critically acclaimed new age albums, of which Pathways to Love topped the new age charts.

From 1991 to 2000, he worked as arranger/performer on Hank Marvin's solo albums and also wrote the title track from Marvin's first album of this period "Into the Light". He was a member of Marvin's touring band on each of his six solo tours between 1994 and 2002.

In 1995, he arranged and performed with Mirage and scored a top-30 album hit in the UK with Classic Guitar Moods.

Bennett's arrangements can also be heard on the 2001 top ten Engelbert Humperdinck album I Want To Wake Up With You and Darren Day's album from the musical Summer Holiday.

In 2004, Bennett arranged and produced the first new Shadows recording for 14 years; the Jerry Lordan penned Life Story which reached number 7 in the UK Albums Chart. Following on from this success, Bennett toured as keyboard player with the Shadows on their 2005 tour of Europe. This was followed by arranging and performing on Reunited, the 50th-anniversary celebration album by Cliff Richard and The Shadows. After the album was released, a 50th-anniversary tour was announced, which included Bennett on keyboards and percussion. The tour began in September 2009, with 36 shows throughout the UK and continental Europe, extending to Australia, New Zealand and South Africa in 2010.

== Record label ==
Bennett's own label, Waffles Music, has released three albums by his band The Vibratos (The Ghost Of Old Compton Street, Tornado Alley and The Cappuccino Kid), who performed at the Pipeline Instrumental Rock Convention in London in 2003, collaborations with Mark Griffiths (Close To The Hedge) and Ben Marvin (Zookeeper) and a solo album titled Left To My Own Devices.

== Television soundtracks ==
His television soundtrack credits include New Tricks, The Ambassador, Wuthering Heights, Can't Buy Me Love, London's Burning, The Knock, Staying Alive, Dirty Work, Holby City, Birds of a Feather and Close to Home.
