= Assistant divisional officer =

Assistant divisional officer (ADO) is a rank formerly used by fire brigades in the United Kingdom. It was replaced in most fire and rescue services with the role of station manager or station commander, depending on the service.

An ADO is the superior of a station officer, and the subordinate to a divisional officer. ADOs served as station commanders – that is, they commanded one or more fire stations, depending on the service.

An ADO is identified by an 18mm black stripe on a white helmet, and three impellers on the epaulettes.
