= Silver & Gold (Neil Young album) =

Studio album by Neil Young
- Released: April 25, 2000
- Recorded: August 26, 1997 – May 28, 1999
- Studios: Redwood Digital, Woodside, California (Note: except "Buffalo Springfield Again" and "The Great Divide": Arlyn Studios, Austin, Texas)
- Genres: Folk rock; country rock
- Length: 39:02
- Label: Reprise
- Producers: Neil Young; Ben Keith

Neil Young chronology
Year of the Horse (1997)	Silver & Gold (2000)	Road Rock Vol. 1 (2000)

Singles from Silver & Gold
- 1. "Razor Love" / "Buffalo Springfield Again" Released: April 2000; 2. "Good to See You" Released: 2000

Professional ratings
Aggregate scores
Source	Rating
Metacritic	73/100
Review scores
Source	Rating
AllMusic	3/5 stars
Entertainment Weekly	B+
The Guardian	2/5 stars
The Independent	3/5 stars
Mojo	4/5 stars
NME	7/10
Q	4/5 stars
Rolling Stone	4.5/5 stars
Spin	7/10
The Village Voice	C+

Silver & Gold is the twenty-fifth studio album by Canadian-American musician Neil Young, released on April 25, 2000. Like the previous albums Comes a Time and Harvest Moon and the subsequent Prairie Wind, it largely features acoustic performances with a backing band of Nashville musicians with a long history of collaboration with Young.

== Writing ==
The bulk of the album was written and recorded in the late 1990s after touring with Crazy Horse on the H.O.R.D.E. Festival. Young enjoyed writing and performing quieter music after the volume of the band performances. He would explain in a March 2000 radio interview: "I wrote ("Good to See You") in my bus in Florida somewhere. There was a thunderstorm and the HORDE tour was playing. And, you know, we had to shut down for half an hour or something. And so I went to my bus and I was in the back. And my voice was real low ‘cause I’d been playing with Crazy Horse and screaming and yelling and carrying on. So my voice was real low. And I wrote these- a couple of songs. "Good to See You" was one of them. And "Without Rings"."

Two of the songs date from the early 1980s. The title track, "Silver and Gold", dates from either 1981 or 1982, while "Razor Love" was first recorded in January 1984. Producing a satisfactory recording of "Silver and Gold" had eluded Young over the years, as he explained in a March 2000 radio interview:

"Well, "Silver and Gold" I think I wrote back in - I don't know 1981 or '82. And I did record it several times. I tried it several ways. And it was such a nice - it's just such a song, you know. It just kind of lives with the guitar. It's just there. And it's always a kind of song you do it the first time, its fine, it sounds great. And then you do it the second time and it's like, you know, why are you doing it again? You just - you've already done it. It's such a simple thing that either you - I would get it right the first time and then by the time the band knew it, it sounded so contrived to me that I could never get it. So I really recorded, I think, a total of 11 times with different people in all kinds of different configurations. And we got 'em all, none of them are worth listening to. But this one here finally just got back to the roots of it and just sat down with my guitar and played it and said, 'That's it.' Because I love the song and I feel the song now and it means something to me now. And so I just did it. When I got back from the HORDE tour a couple of years ago, I went in the studio, sat down and did this one the second day after I was back, I think."

"Good To See You" was written during the HORDE tour, and reflects the feeling of coming home after a long time away.

"Silver & Gold", was first recorded for the unreleased Island in the Sun, and is about comparing the value of a relationship to material things. Young has said, "You could take a look at me and say I was really full of it, because I have so many possessions it's ridiculous. But it's dawning on me how useless most of them are."

"Daddy Went Walkin'" was inspired by Young's memories growing up in Ontario, and also memories of growing up as the child of divorced parents:

"It's not my father or your father. It's just fathers. It's not so much about them, it's like, you look at these old folks who have lost their mates or maybe they've gotten divorced years and years ago, like my parents. And then one of them dies, and then the other one is still here and with a new mate. But the kids think they're going to get back together again; that the real parents are going to get back together. Is this something you want? You want to see your parents together. So, even if your parents aren't together maybe they will be someday. I lived in this place called Omemee, which is outside of Toronto about 100 miles way out by a lake. A really funky, beautiful little town - Canadian town, 700 people. That's really where I grew up. We had two acres behind the house with a little barn, and then a garage and a loft. And out behind there I'd walk through the grass and we had a little creek that went through and we used to catch frogs and stuff. There was a railroad track back there where the trains used to go by and steam engines and everything. And we'd put the coins on the track and put your ear down. You could hear the train coming on the rail before it came around the corner and all that kind of stuff. So that's part of it. And then the last time that I visited my dad, who lived in Ireland for a while, he took us for a walk out on these fields. And he let us through all this stuff. And we're going through all these brambles and over wire fences and all this stuff. And that's in there too."

"Buffalo Springfield Again" was inspired by Young's memories of his time in the band, which was fresh on his mind from compiling the Buffalo Springfield box set, released the following year, as well as his recent reunion with CSNY. "What's cool about CSN&Y is it gives Stephen and me a chance to play around with what we were doing back then and take it to another level. When he came up to the ranch to work on the box set, part of it was kind of depressing in the end because I think we both felt like it had all been cut short. We realized how much more there was for us to do."

"The Great Divide" is a sad song that uses geographic metaphor to describe the ups and downs of a relationship.

The lyrics to "Horseshoe Man" portray a Cupid-like figure that repairs broken relationships. "He's the one we can all count on, the one who makes things interesting. He fixes broken hearts by taking the pieces and throwing them up and down. He shakes things up."

"Red Sun" was inspired by a visit to Young's father in Ireland. "I wrote this song on a really fresh day. My head was feeling good and I was really open. I remember I was by myself when I did it and, by the end, I was crying. It was very emotional."

"Razor Love" was originally recorded in January 1984 on Synclavier. Its lyrics describe a love that "cuts clean through. It's the kind of love that cuts clean through everything." The reference to the 'greedy hand' are likely inspired by Young's difficulties with his record company, Geffen at the time.

"Without Rings" was "one of the first songs I recorded, back when I thought I was doing an acoustic solo album. It's another one I wrote in the back of the bus, somewhere in Florida at some weird amusement park in the middle of the Everglades. I had this big piece of newspaper with felt tip marker writing all over it. It's kind of like 'Mr. Soul,' inasmuch as it was written on a piece of newspaper with a felt tip marker and it all came out in one long line and then it was done."

== Recording ==
Recording the album spanned two years, from the end of the HORDE tour in 1997 until the summer of 1999. During that time, Young made an attempt at recording an electric album with Crazy Horse and producer Rick Rubin. Young also toyed with the idea of recording the album on miniature instruments: "I was going to make an acoustic album called Acoustica which I worked on developing ideas for, and I did a lot of recording for, where I was using tiny little instruments that I wanted to mic really well and make them really loud. And try to get in really close to get a different texture in the music. But I never could get what I was looking for. I'm going to try again sometime later."

Ultimately, Young would record the album at his ranch, with he and Ben Keith serving as producers. Several songs feature backing vocals by Emmylou Harris and Linda Ronstadt. Young discusses recording the vocals for "Red Sun": "I kept hearing Emmylou Harris' voice on it and I finally ended up taking it to Tucson to Linda Ronstadt's house, where she and Emmylou were working on an album with Dolly Parton. They ended up singing on a lot of the songs on this album, but this one really got to me. The song's got a little bit of religion in it and Emmylou's voice, especially, is suited to that."

The album was recorded concurrently with the CSNY album Looking Forward, released the previous year. Three of its songs, "Looking Forward", "Slowpoke" and "Out of Control" were first considered for Silver & Gold. Young allowed the band to review the album and choose songs that would better suit the group effort. Young found that sharing those songs helped solidify a running order for the remaining songs into a more cohesive album:

"My songs that they picked from my selection from - that I had recorded for Silver and Gold, they took three of my songs. I thought they came out really well. I like the way they sang on 'em and everything. It sounds really good to me. And the funny thing is, when those songs were taken from the mix, were taken from the other songs, they - the songs that were left were - you know, there were too many songs. And they were all - originally there were too many songs for Silver and Gold. And they were all struggling and kind of holding each other down. And when CSN picked those three songs out and then I was left with the other ten or eleven, they suddenly just fell into place. It was really a great feeling, because I was struggling with trying to put it together. And when they took those three songs out, it just - everything else was left. I mean, I just wrote them out in order of what I wanted to hear and that was it. It never changed again. The running order was right. Everything was right. So there was something about it that was really right, where you give something away and you get something back. You know, it's like a reward for sharing or something. I don't know. It's a good feeling.

== Release ==
The album art is a photo taken by Neil's daughter Amber with the Game Boy Camera.

The U.S. release uses HDCD encoding.

== Promotion ==
Young promoted the album with a solo acoustic tour of the United States. The tour featured both new songs and older songs performed in unique ways, including banjo and piano performances. The show from Bass Concert Hall in Austin, Texas was professionally recorded and filmed by director L.A. Johnson. A DVD of the performance, also titled Neil Young: Silver and Gold was released June 15th, 2000. An acoustic performance of "Cortez the Killer" from the March 20th show at Oakland's Paramount Theatre was provided to Cameron Crowe for use in the movie Almost Famous.

== Reception ==
The album was a nominee for Roots & Traditional Album of the Year – Solo at the 2001 Juno Awards.

== Track listing ==
All songs composed by Neil Young

No.	Title	Length
1.	"Good to See You"	2:48
2.	"Silver & Gold"	3:17
3.	"Daddy Went Walkin'"	4:02
4.	"Buffalo Springfield Again"	3:21
5.	"The Great Divide"	4:32
6.	"Horseshoe Man"	3:59
7.	"Red Sun"	2:46
8.	"Distant Camera"	4:06
9.	"Razor Love"	6:29
10.	"Without Rings"	3:42

== Personnel ==
- Neil Young – guitar, piano, harmonica, vocals, production
- Ben Keith – pedal steel guitar, vocals, production
- Spooner Oldham – piano, Hammond organ
- Donald Dunn – bass guitar
- Jim Keltner – drums
- Oscar Butterworth – drums
- Linda Ronstadt – vocals
- Emmylou Harris – vocals

Additional roles

- Gary Burden, Jenice Heo – art direction & design
- Amber Young, Pegi Young – photography
- Elliot Roberts – direction
- Tim Mulligan – recording (1, 3–9), mixing, editing, mastering
- John Hausmann – recording assistant (1–6, 8–10)
- Larry Greenhill – recording (4–5), mixing (5)
- Bobby Arnold – recording assistant (4–5)
- Jim Brady – recording assistant (7)
- John Nowland – recording (2, 10), mixing (1–4, 6–10)
- Denny Purcell – mastering

== Charts ==
Chart performance for Silver & Gold
Chart (2000)	Peak position
Australian Albums (ARIA)	30
Austrian Albums (Ö3 Austria)	18
Belgian Albums (Ultratop Flanders)	20
Canada Top Albums/CDs (RPM)	5
Canadian Albums (Billboard)	11
Dutch Albums (Album Top 100)	25
Finnish Albums (Suomen virallinen lista)	18
French Albums (SNEP)	38
German Albums (Offizielle Top 100)	5
Irish Albums (IRMA)	16
Italian Albums (FIMI)	11
New Zealand Albums (RMNZ)	49
Norwegian Albums (VG-lista)	2
Swedish Albums (Sverigetopplistan)	9
Swiss Albums (Schweizer Hitparade)	70
UK Albums (Official Charts)	10
US Billboard 200	22
