= Road Rock Vol. 1 =

Live album by Neil Young
- Released: December 5, 2000
- Recorded: August 29 – October 1, 2000
- Venue: Various
- Genre: Rock
- Length: 64:28
- Label: Reprise
- Producers: Neil Young; Ben Keith

Neil Young chronology
Silver & Gold (2000)	Road Rock Vol. 1 (2000)	Are You Passionate? (2002)

Singles from Road Rock Vol. 1
- 1. "Fool For Your Love" / "All Along the Watchtower" Released: November 2000

Professional ratings
Aggregate scores
Source	Rating
Metacritic	61/100
Review scores
Source	Rating
AllMusic	2.5/5 stars
Dotmusic	4/5 stars
The Independent	3/5 stars
Mojo	3.5/5 stars
Q	2/5 stars
Rolling Stone	3.5/5 stars
Select	3/5 stars
Tom Hull – on the Web	B+
The Village Voice	B+

Road Rock Vol. 1: Friends & Relatives is a live album released in 2000 by Canadian-American musician Neil Young. The "friends and relatives" include Ben Keith, Chrissie Hynde, Duck Dunn, Young's then wife, Pegi, and his sister, Astrid. The album features what had been an unreleased song, "Fool for Your Love", which dates from Young's This Note's for You period, and a Bob Dylan cover, "All Along the Watchtower".

A companion DVD/VHS video called Red Rocks Live, Neil Young Friends & Relatives was also released to accompany the album, containing footage from Young's concerts at Red Rocks Amphitheater recorded on Sep 19 & 20, 2000. Red Rocks Live was recorded by David Hewitt on Remote Recording Services' Silver Truck.

== Track listing ==
=== CD ===
All tracks composed by Neil Young; except where indicated

No.	Title	Writer(s)	Length
1.	"Cowgirl In The Sand"		18:00
2.	"Walk On"		4:30
3.	"Fool For Your Love"		3:06
4.	"Peace Of Mind"		5:00
5.	"Words"		11:00
6.	"Motorcycle Mama"		5:30
7.	"Tonight's The Night"		10:00
8.	"All Along The Watchtower"	Bob Dylan	7:50

=== DVD ===
1. "Intro"
2. "Motorcycle Mama"
3. "Powderfinger"
4. "Everybody Knows This Is Nowhere"
5. "I Believe In You"
6. "Unknown Legend"
7. "Fool For Your Love"
8. "Buffalo Springfield Again"
9. "Razor Love"
10. "Daddy Went Walkin'"
11. "Peace of Mind"
12. "Walk On"
13. "Winterlong"
14. "Bad Fog of Loneliness"
15. "Words"
16. "Harvest Moon"
17. "World on a String"
18. "Tonight's The Night"
19. "Cowgirl In The Sand"
20. "Credits"
21. "Mellow My Mind"

== Personnel ==
- Neil Young – guitar, piano, vocals, production
- Ben Keith – guitar, lap slide, pedal steel, vocals, production
- Spooner Oldham – piano, Wurlitzer electric piano, Hammond B3 organ
- Donald "Duck" Dunn – bass
- Jim Keltner – drums, percussion
- Astrid Young – vocals
- Pegi Young – vocals
- Chrissie Hynde – guitar, vocals on "All Along the Watchtower"

Additional roles

- Gary Burden, Jenice Heo – art direction & design
- Danny Clinch, Lynn Rabren, Cliff Barbins, Damon Hennessey – photography
- Tim Mulligan, John Drane – mixing
- John Hanlon – post production engineering
- Bernie Grundman – digital mastering engineer
- Elliot Roberts – direction

== Charts ==
Chart performance for Road Rock Vol. 1
Chart (2000–01)	Peak position
German Albums (Offizielle Top 100)	49
Norwegian Albums (VG-lista)	37
US Billboard 200	169
