= Dreamin' Man Live '92 =

Live album by Neil Young
- Released: December 8, 2009
- Recorded: 1992
- Venue: Various
- Genre: Folk rock
- Length: 55:48
- Label: Reprise
- Producer: Neil Young; John Hanlon

Neil Young chronology
Neil Young Archives Vol. 1 1963–1972 (2009)	Dreamin' Man Live '92 (2009)	Le Noise (2010)

Archives Performance Series chronology
PS11.5: Way Down in the Rust Bucket (2021)	PS12: Dreamin' Man Live '92 (2009)	PS16: Return to Greendale (2020)

Professional ratings
Review scores
Source	Rating
AllMusic	3.5/5 stars
Classic Rock	7/10 stars
Pitchfork Media	(5.0/10)

Dreamin' Man Live '92 is a live album by the Canadian / American musician Neil Young, released on December 8, 2009. It features live, solo acoustic performances of all ten songs from Harvest Moon, recorded on tour in 1992. The album is volume twelve in Young's Archives Performance Series and the fifth to be released. It was originally slated for release on November 2, 2009, but was delayed for over a month; a vinyl release followed on March 30, 2010.

== Track listing ==
All songs written by Neil Young.

No.	Title	Length
1.	"Dreamin' Man" (Portland, Oregon; January 24, 1992)	5:03
2.	"Such A Woman" (Detroit, Michigan; May 20, 1992)	4:59
3.	"One Of These Days" (Los Angeles, California; September 21, 1992)	4:59
4.	"Harvest Moon" (Los Angeles, California; September 21, 1992)	5:26
5.	"You And Me" (Los Angeles, California; September 21, 1992)	4:01
6.	"From Hank to Hendrix" (Los Angeles, California; September 21, 1992)	5:31
7.	"Unknown Legend" (Los Angeles, California; September 22, 1992)	4:47
8.	"Old King" (Los Angeles, California; September 22, 1992)	3:10
9.	"Natural Beauty" (Chicago, Illinois; November 19, 1992)	11:26
10.	"War Of Man" (Minneapolis, Minnesota, November 22, 1992)	6:27

== Personnel ==
- Neil Young – vocals, guitar, harmonica, piano, banjo, production
- John Hanlon – production

== Charts ==
Chart (2009)	Peak position
Dutch Albums (Album Top 100)	74
US Billboard 200	193
US Top Rock Albums (Billboard)	43
US Top Current Album Sales (Billboard)	146
