= From Hank to Hendrix =

- Spanish release sleeve

Song by Neil Young

from the album Harvest Moon
- Released: November 2, 1992
- Recorded: September 20, 1991
- Studio: Redwood Digital
- Genre: Country rock
- Length: 5:12
- Label: Reprise
- Songwriter(s): Neil Young
- Producer(s): Neil Young; Ben Keith

"From Hank to Hendrix" is a song written by Neil Young that was first released on his 1992 album Harvest Moon. Young has frequently included it in live sets and it has been included on a number of live and compilation albums.

== Lyrics and music ==
The lyrics of "From Hank to Hendrix" tell of the changes in a relationship over time, using musical and pop culture figures as reference points. The "Hank" in the title refers to either Hank Williams or Hank Marvin, both of whom inspired Young, and the "Hendrix" refers to Jimi Hendrix. Humanities professor Martin Halliwell takes the view that "Hank" refers to Hank Williams and interprets the title as referring to the two musical directions Young likes to take - Williams' acoustic country blues versus Hendrix' "histrionic guitar blues." The pop culture touch points in the song are Marilyn Monroe and Madonna.

The early verses of the song tell of the singer's devotion to the woman, as he sings about how he believed in her and loved her smile over the period covered by the song. But the mood of the lyrics shifts when the singer notes that "Now we're headed for the big divorce California-style." The reference to divorce suggests that the song may be about Young's ex-partner Carrie Snodgress. Rolling Stone Album Guide contributor Rob Sheffield contrasts this song with the Harvest Moon title track in that "Harvest Moon" celebrates a marriage that lasted while "From Hank to Hendrix" mourns one that did not. But many of the Harvest Moon songs, including the title track, are about his then-current wife Pegi Young, in which case the reference to divorce is more jolting. Young has explained that "The divorce is never mentioned again [in the song]. It's just another element in the relationship." Young has further stated:

Well that's one part of the story. There's a whole bunch of things in there...You're constantly wondering which way things are going to go. Whether it's going to last or whether it's going to explode. That's part of the romantic relationship, certain amounts of turmoil.

Rolling Stone critic Greg Kot places this song within a progression of songs that opens Harvest Moon, which "traces a path from restlessness to reaffirmation, in which the rootless 'Unknown Legend' and the doubt-filled narrator of 'From Hank to Hendrix' finally find contentment beneath the 'Harvest Moon.'”

Ken Bielen suggests that the line about divorce displays Young's economical use of words in that the "California-style" divorce suggests the celebrity-driven culture in the U.S and the possible personal cost of that culture. Bielen compares lines in the opening verse that the narrator is a musician with a later line that "The same thing that makes you live/Can kill you in the end" as implying that "the rock-and-roll lifestyle can take a toll on a marriage." And indeed Young's marriage to Pegi came to an end 22 years later. Young biographer David Downing interprets the reference to divorce a little differently. He interprets that the fact that the possibility of divorce is mentioned once but then not again as suggesting that divorce is just part of marriage the way death is part of life. Downing interprets the song as being an "ambitious attempt at understanding the process by which people carry their pasts into their presents."

Bielen describes both the song's melody and Young's vocal as being "tender." In a link to Young's earlier album Harvest, Linda Ronstadt and James Taylor provide backing vocals on the refrain. Neil Young FAQ author Glen Boyd comments on the "gorgeous" pedal steel accents played by Ben Keith.

== Reception ==
Allmusic critic Stephen Thomas Erlewine considers "From Hank to Hendrix" to be one of Young's best songs. In 2014, the editors of Rolling Stone ranked "From Hank to Hendrix" as Neil Young's 20th greatest song of all time. A Rolling Stone reader poll in 2016 ranked "From Hank to Hendrix" as Young's 9th best song since 1979. Music journalist Paul Williams says that the lyrics start out promising but he considers the "payoff line," "Can we make it last, like a musical ride?" to be "almost as bad as the dreadful American Dream stuff Neil wrote for the last CSNY album."

== Live performances ==
Young has often played "From Hank to Hendrix" in live sets, frequently to open concerts. Many times Young tells the story of how he acquired a guitar previously owned by Hank Williams before playing the song. Young played it as the last song of his 1993 MTV Unplugged concert and it was included on his Unplugged album. Young also sang it at a Saturday Night Live performance, which the editors of Rolling Stone described as "casting a spell that few performers his age could match – a rock elder sharing a little of his hard-won wisdom."

== Personnel ==
- Neil Young – guitar, harmonica, hurdy-gurdy, vocals
- Tim Drummond – bass
- Ben Keith – steel guitar
- Kenny Buttrey – drums
- Spooner Oldham – piano
- Linda Ronstadt – vocals
- James Taylor – vocals
