= Rachel Getting Married (soundtrack) =

Rachel Getting Married (Original Motion Picture Soundtrack)

Soundtrack album by various artists
- Released: October 7, 2008
- Recorded: 2008
- Genre: Classical; orchestral
- Length: 50:22
- Label: Lakeshore
- Producer: Neda Armian; Suzana Perić

Rachel Getting Married (Original Motion Picture Soundtrack) is the soundtrack to the 2008 film Rachel Getting Married, directed by Jonathan Demme. The album features original music composed by individual musicians live on set that are heard in the film. The film does not feature a traditional score, but instead featured independent musical pieces composed for specific sequences, by Donald Harrison Jr. and Zafer Tawil, who received the score credit. The soundtrack was published by Lakeshore Records and released on October 7, 2008.

== Development ==
Jonathan Demme invited musicians to compose the score live on set, to support the Dogme style of filmmaking which was integral to the storyline. He had the desire to provide the musical dimension without a traditional film score, which served organically, and speaking to an interview with Elisa Bray of The Independent, he admitted that:

"...in the script, Paul [father of the bride] is a music-industry bigwig, Sidney's a record producer, many of his friends will be gifted musicians, so of course there would be non-stop music at this gathering. We have music playing live throughout the weekend, but always in the next room, out on the porch or in the garden."

Some of the musicians who scored the film in sets featured contributions from the New York-based Middle Eastern ensemble, including Zafer Tawil and Amir ElSaffar, who were provided freedom to play specific musicians they were inspired to. Saxophonist Donald Harrison Jr. and Tunde Adebimpe, the lead singer of the Brooklyn-based band TV on the Radio also performed on-screen with Adebimpe crooning the cover of Neil Young's "Unknown Legend".

Singer-songwriter Robyn Hitchcock stars in the film as a wedding guest, who performed the song "America" from his album Groovy Decay (1982) at the request of Jonathan; he also performed "Up To Our Nex" written and recorded specifically for the film, who described it as the voice in Kym's head. ElSaffar arranged the horns and Jonathan's son Brooklyn Demme was played on electric guitar.

Despite not having a traditional background score, Tawil and Harrison Jr. composed specific cues especially in an emotional sequence where Kym enters a child's breedom and looks out of the window, where a haunting violin melody is played in the request of a sad floating music. Tawil played the cue which was revealed to the director during production.

== Reception ==
William Ruhlmann of AllMusic wrote "It may not make a lot of sense in the movie, but it makes for a varied and entertaining soundtrack album." Tom Huddleston of Time Out summarised "the music is exclusively diegetic, with old lags like Robyn Hitchcock and Sister Carol East providing a wildly diverse soundtrack to the celebrations." Deborah Young of The Hollywood Reporter opined that the diegetic music enhanced the film, and "Zafar Tawil's violin theme strike an emotional chord". Ronnie Scheib of Variety reviewed that the characters are "dazzlingly counterpointed musically, as Mendelssohn-strumming electric guitarists, scantily costumed dancers or Arabic flautists march to the beats of different drums with overarching harmony." Writing for Pitchfork, Matthew Schnipper—in the website's column for "the best film soundtracks that needed reissues"—reviewed on Adebimpe's rendition of "Unknown Legend" and added "this brief moment is a respite from the dark times before and the ones probably coming".

== Track listing ==
Rachel Getting Married (Original Motion Picture Soundtrack) track listing
| No. | Title | Artist(s) | Length |
|---|---|---|---|
| 1. | "Unknown Legend" | Tunde Adebimpe | 2:27 |
| 2. | "Wedding Waltz" | Zafer Tawil | 1:45 |
| 3. | "Kym's Homecoming" | Zafer Tawil | 2:59 |
| 4. | "America" | Robyn Hitchcock | 4:39 |
| 5. | "Here Come the Bride" | Brooklyn Demme and Barry Eastmond Jr. | 0:51 |
| 6. | "Rachel Loves Sidney" | Donald Harrison Jr. | 1:23 |
| 7. | "Samba for Shiva" | Cyro Baptista and Beat the Donkey | 2:27 |
| 8. | "Ethan's Theme" | Zafer Tawil | 2:45 |
| 9. | "Up to Our Nex" | Robyn Hitchcock | 3:44 |
| 10. | "Dread Natty Congo" | Sister Carol East | 4:56 |
| 11. | "Dancing With Shiva" | Black Bombay | 5:16 |
| 12. | "It's Been Done" | Angela McCluskey | 3:57 |
| 13. | "Lower Ninth Ward Blues" | Al "Carnival Time" Johnson | 3:24 |
| 14. | "In My Soul" | Tavash Graham featuring Tamyra Gray | 2:33 |
| 15. | "Trilla" | Brooklyn Demme | 2:59 |
| 16. | "Rachel Loves Sidney" (Studio Version) | Donald Harrison Jr. | 4:17 |
| Total length: | | | 50:22 |

== Personnel ==
Credits adapted from liner notes.

- Art direction – Stephanie Mente
- Coordinator – Emily Woodburne, Nancy Allen
- Executive producer – Brian McNelis, Neda Armian, Skip Williamson, Suzana Perić
- Layout – John Bergin
- Liner notes – Jonathan Demme
- Mixing – Tony Volante
- Score composer – Donald Harrison Jr., Zafer Tawil
- Music supervision – Innbo Shim

== Charts ==
Chart performance for Rachel Getting Married (Original Motion Picture Soundtrack)
| Chart (2008) | Peak position |
|---|---|
| US Top Soundtracks (Billboard) | 1 |
