= The Mountain House =

Coordinates: 37°26′18″N 122°19′21″W

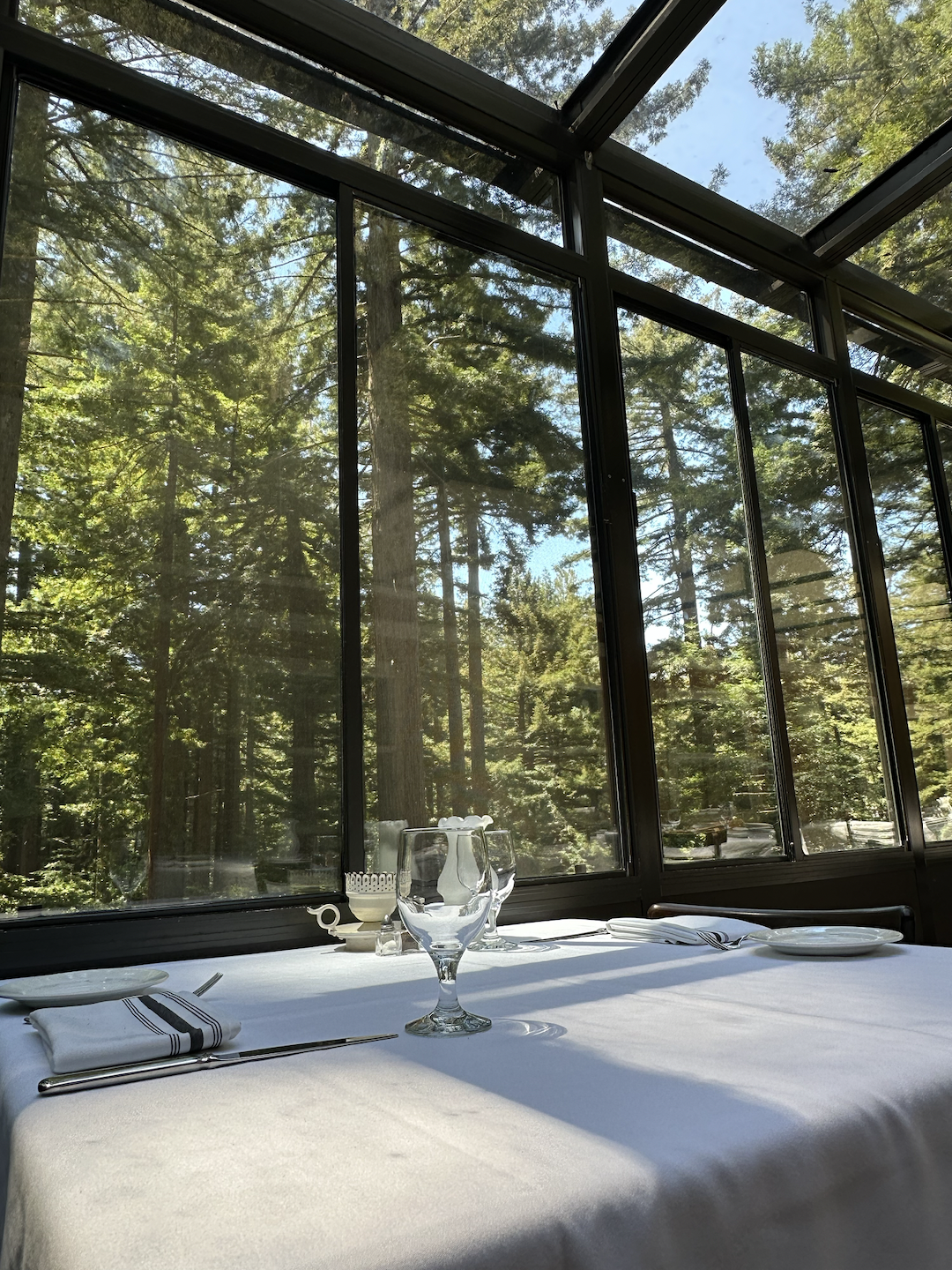
- The interior of The Mountain House restaurant features a view of the redwood forest outside.

Restaurant information
- Owner(s): William Roberts; Dmitry Elperin
- Food type: Californian
- Location: Woodside, California, United States
- Website: themountainhouse.com

The Mountain House is a restaurant located on Skyline Boulevard in Kings Mountain, Woodside, California. Initially established over a century ago hosting a variety of community roles, it has been featured in a plethora of music video clips by prominent artists mostly due to its unique location inside a redwood forest.

== Description ==
The restaurant, housed within a vermilion cabin and located at Skyline Boulevard, inside the redwood forests of Woodside, is a century-old dining destination. According to Chef William Roberts, since the early 1900s, it has played diverse roles within the community, having initially served as a gathering place for adventurers, loggers and locals. Initially, it functioned as a water pump station for homesteaders and later transformed into a frontier saloon. Dianne de Guzman of Eater, amongst other publications reported of the 2023 reopening of the restaurant by Michelin-starred chefs.

== Cuisine and menu ==
While the previous owner's crew specialised in local seafood and wild game, current management under Elperin and William is starting anew with a different concept. Talking to The San Francisco Standard, Elperin mentioned that following the relaunch of The Mountain House, it will focus on "coastal countryside cuisine." It is primarily based on game, venison, quail and sustainable trout.

== History ==
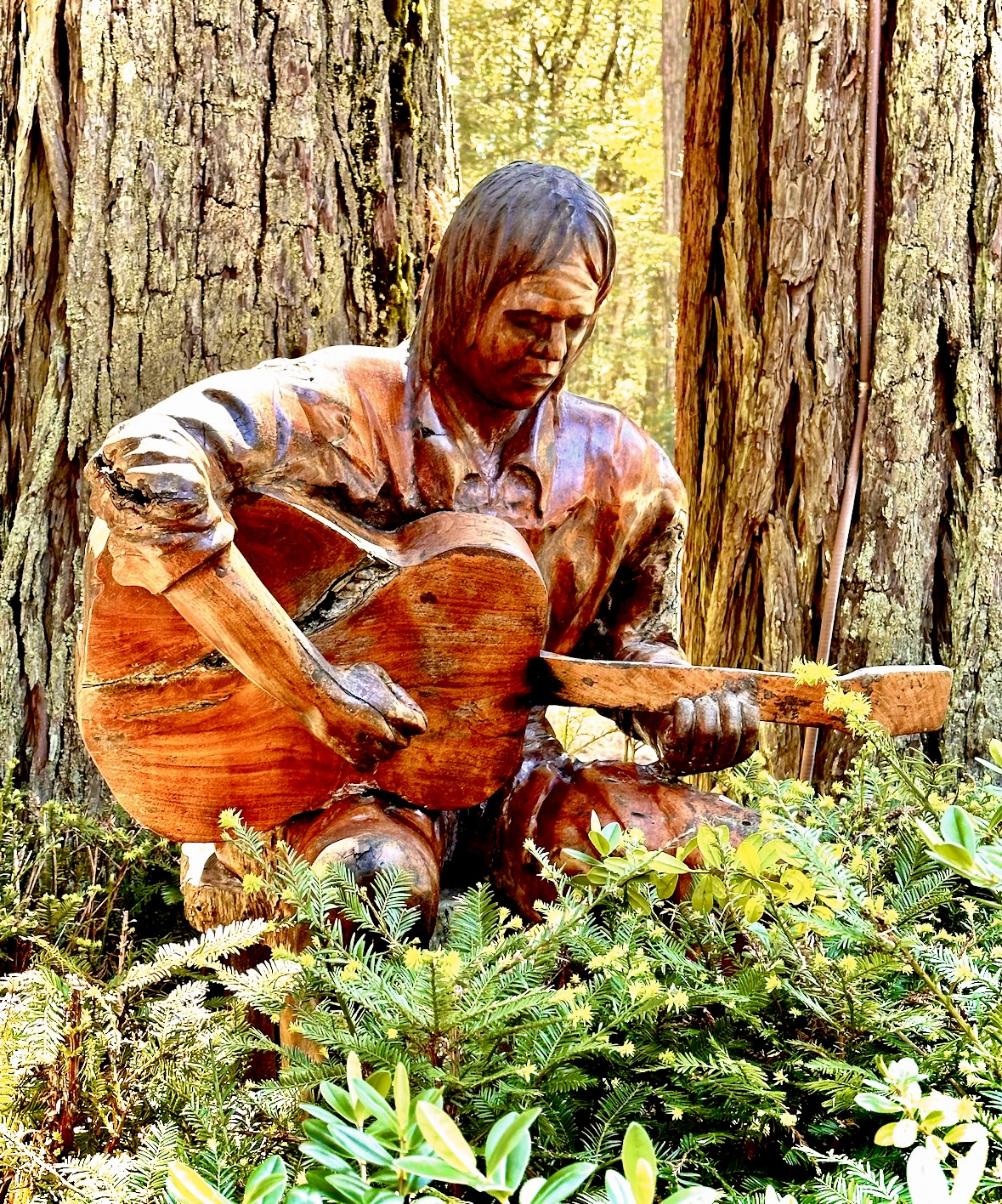
A wooden sculpture of Neil Young is situated right outside the entrance of the restaurant. It is sitting amongst tall redwood trees.

=== Music and filmography ===
The restaurant has served as the filming location for multiple video clips, most notably Neil Young's "Harvest Moon" from his homonymous album released in 1992. The video clip, which features and showcases the restaurant throughout its duration as well as the consistent-to-today branding of the restaurant in the '90s, is the most viewed YouTube video of Neil Young's channel with over 90,000,000 views.

According to the New York Times, the singer used to frequently visit the restaurant since it was close to his ranch. Neil Young has most recently been photographed outside the location working on a new album with a producer Daniel Lanois in 2010, as published by the Los Angeles Times.

=== Reopening ===
The previous owner closed down the restaurant in April 2022 upon retiring. The restaurant reopened on February 23, 2023, by Michelin-starred Chef Dmitry Elperin and Chef William Roberts.

== See also ==
- Restaurants in California
- Neil Young
