= Unplugged (Neil Young album) =

Live album by Neil Young
- Released: June 15, 1993
- Recorded: February 7, 1993
- Venues: Universal Studios, Los Angeles
- Genre: Rock
- Length: 65:35
- Label: Reprise
- Producer: David Briggs

Neil Young chronology
Lucky Thirteen (1993)	Unplugged (1993)	Sleeps with Angels (1994)

Singles from Unplugged
- 1. "The Needle and the Damage Done" / "You And Me" Released: July 1993; 2. "Long May You Run" / "Sugar Mountain" Released: October 1993

Professional ratings
Review scores
Source	Rating
AllMusic	3/5 stars
Calgary Herald	B+
NME	8/10
Rolling Stone	3/5 stars
Select	4/5 medals

Unplugged is a live album by Canadian-American singer-songwriter Neil Young, released on June 15, 1993, on Reprise. Recorded on February 7, 1993, the album is an installment of the MTV series, Unplugged. The performance was also released on VHS.

== Background and recording ==
The recording of Unplugged was reportedly rife with tension, with Young displeased with the performances of many of his band members. The released version was his second attempt at recording a set suitable for airing and release.

The track "Stringman" was recorded for Young's notoriously unreleased studio album Chrome Dreams.

== Track listing ==
All tracks composed by Neil Young

No.	Title	Length
1.	"The Old Laughing Lady" (from Neil Young)	5:15
2.	"Mr. Soul" (from Buffalo Springfield Again)	3:54
3.	"World On A String" (from Tonight's the Night)	3:02
4.	"Pocahontas" (from Rust Never Sleeps)	5:06
5.	"Stringman" (unreleased prior to Unplugged)	4:01
6.	"Like A Hurricane" (from American Stars 'n Bars)	4:44
7.	"The Needle And The Damage Done" (from Harvest)	2:52
8.	"Helpless" (from Déjà Vu)	5:48
9.	"Harvest Moon" (from Harvest Moon)	5:20
10.	"Transformer Man" (from Trans)	3:36
11.	"Unknown Legend" (from Harvest Moon)	4:47
12.	"Look Out For My Love" (from Comes a Time)	5:57
13.	"Long May You Run" (from Long May You Run)	5:22
14.	"From Hank to Hendrix" (from Harvest Moon)	5:51

In addition to the tracks found on this album, Neil Young performed the following songs live during the performance:

- "Dreamin' Man"
- "Sample and Hold"
- "War of Man"
- "Winterlong"

== Personnel ==
- Neil Young – guitar, harmonica, piano, pump organ, lead vocals
- Nils Lofgren – guitar, autoharp, accordion, backing vocals
- Ben Keith – Dobro
- Spooner Oldham – piano, pump organ
- Tim Drummond – bass
- Oscar Butterworth – drums
- Astrid Young – backing vocals
- Nicolette Larson – backing vocals
- Larry Cragg – broom on "Harvest Moon"

Additional roles

- Janet Levinson – art direction & design
- Joel Bernstein – photography
- David Briggs – production, mixing
- Tim Mulligan – mastering
- John Hanlon – mixing, recording
- John Hausmann, John Nowland – mixing

== Charts ==
Chart performance for Unplugged
Chart (1993)	Peak position
Australian Albums (ARIA)	19
Austrian Albums (Ö3 Austria)	13
Canadian Albums (The Record)	8
Dutch Albums (Album Top 100)	13
Finnish Albums (Suomen virallinen lista)	7
German Albums (Offizielle Top 100)	31
New Zealand Albums (RMNZ)	16
Norwegian Albums (VG-lista)	5
Swedish Albums (Sverigetopplistan)	8
Swiss Albums (Schweizer Hitparade)	25
UK Albums (Official Charts)	4
US Billboard 200	23

Chart (2026)	Peak position
Hungarian Physical Albums (MAHASZ)	31

== Certifications and sales ==
Region	Certification	Certified units/sales
Australia (ARIA)	Gold	35,000^{^}
Belgium (BRMA)	Gold	25,000^{*}
United Kingdom (BPI)	Gold	100,000^{^}
United States (RIAA)	Gold	500,000^{^}
^{*} Sales figures based on certification alone.^{^} Shipments figures based on certification alone.
