= Bridge School Benefit =

Annual benefit concert in Northern California (1986–2016)

Coordinates: 37°25′36″N 122°04′51″W

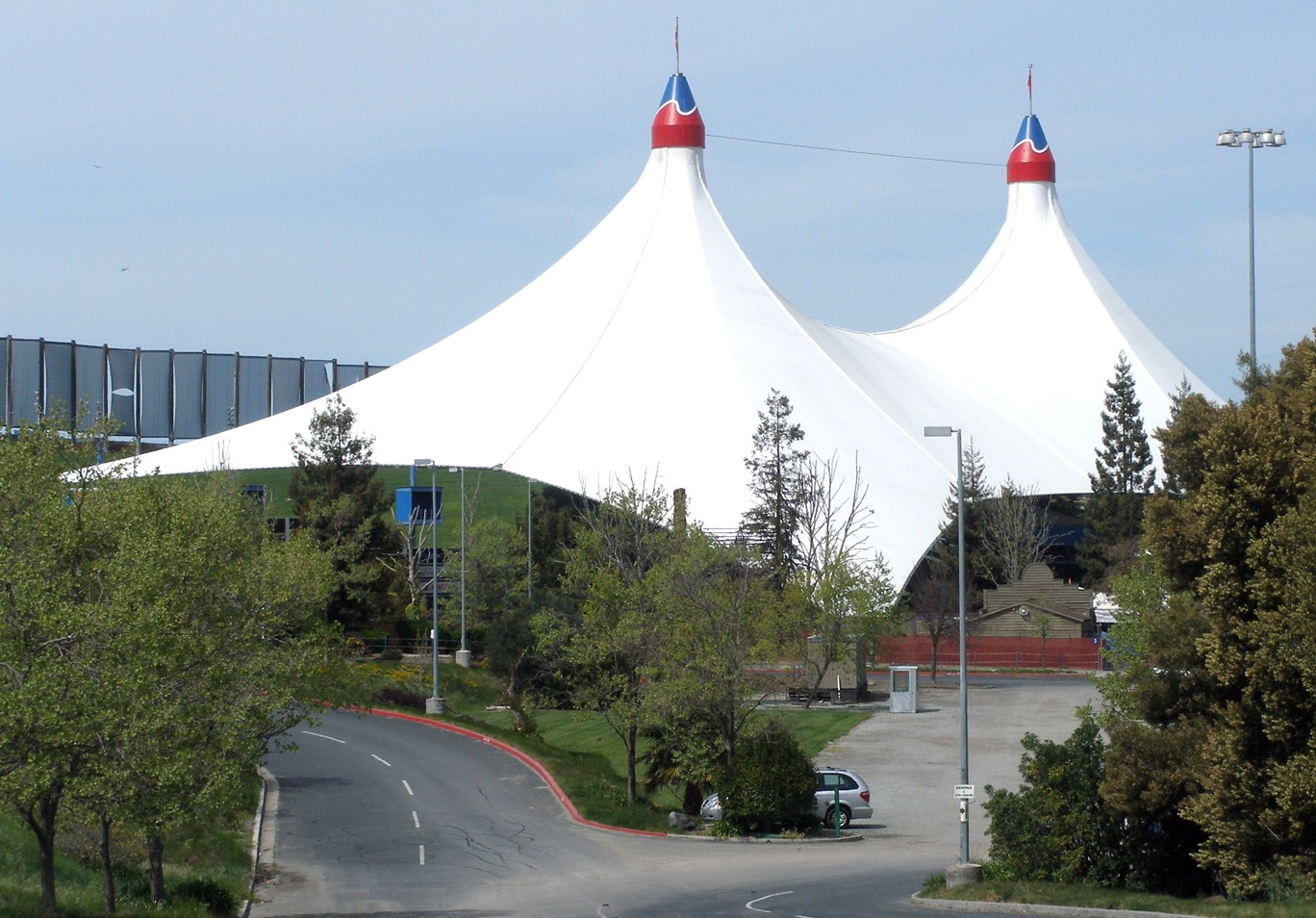
Shoreline Amphitheatre in Mountain View, California

The Bridge School Benefit was an annual charity concert usually held in Mountain View, California, every October at the Shoreline Amphitheatre from 1986 until 2016 with the exception of 1987. The concerts lasted the entire weekend and were organized by musicians Neil Young and Pegi Young. The concerts were billed online as the primary means of funding for the Bridge School, a nonprofit organization. The reserved seats alone brought in over a million dollars every year.

Partial proceeds benefited the Bridge School, which assists children with severe physical impairments and complex communication needs. One of the thrusts of the program is the use of advanced augmentative and alternative communication and assistive technology.

Every concert was filmed and a copy of each was given to Neil Young. Young announced in 2021 that he would be slowly releasing all the recordings of the Bridge School Benefits concert via his Archives, starting with the first show in 1986. All the proceeds for viewing the concert videos will go to the Bridge School.

== History ==
The first concert was in October 1986; with the exception of 1987, the concert was held every year until 2016. The benefit was known for having a relatively high-profile lineup and strong acoustic-only performances, primarily due to Young's extensive connections within the music industry. He performed as the headliner every year; oftentimes, Young would opt to join other artists on stage multiple times throughout the weekend. At times he would bring another artist on stage and do a collaboration of one of his songs with them.

On November 18, 1997, The Bridge School Concerts, Vol. 1, a compilation CD containing 15 songs, was released by Reprise Records.

In 2006, a six-volume set, The Bridge School Collection, Vol. 1, was released through iTunes. The set contains 80 recordings from the concerts and a digital booklet. Additional volumes from the concerts were released on iTunes annually through 2011.

On October 24, 2011, Reprise Records released The Bridge School Concerts 25th Anniversary Edition, a compilation CD containing 25 songs, with critical acclaim.

The last concerts were held in October 2016. On June 14, 2017, Neil and Pegi Young announced that, following their divorce, the Bridge School Concerts would no longer continue.

== List of concerts ==
- Bridge I October 13, 1986 in Mountain View, California at the Shoreline Amphitheater
  - Performers included: Crosby, Stills, Nash & Young, Nils Lofgren, Don Henley, Tom Petty, Robin Williams, and Bruce Springsteen.
- Bridge II December 4, 1988 in Oakland, California at the Oakland Coliseum
  - Performers included: Crosby, Stills, Nash & Young, Nils Lofgren, Billy Idol, Bob Dylan, G. E. Smith, Jerry Garcia & Bob Weir, Tom Petty and the Heartbreakers, and Tracy Chapman.
- Bridge III October 28, 1989
  - Performers included: Crosby, Stills, Nash & Young, Tracy Chapman, Tom Petty, and Sammy Hagar.
- Bridge IV October 26, 1990
  - Performers included: Neil Young, Cheech Marin, Gene LaFond and Larry Kegan, Jackson Browne, Edie Brickell, Elvis Costello, Steve Miller, and Crazy Horse.
- Bridge V November 2, 1991
  - Performers included: Gene LaFond & Larry Kegan, Neil Young, Don Henley, Nils Lofgren, Tracy Chapman, John Lee Hooker, Sonic Youth, and Willie Nelson.
- Bridge VI November 1, 1992
  - Performers included: Neil Young, Sammy Hagar, Elton John, Pearl Jam, James Taylor, and Shawn Colvin.
- Bridge VII November 6, 1993
  - Performers included: Neil Young, Melissa Etheridge, Warren Zevon, Ann & Nancy Wilson, Sammy Hagar & Eddie Van Halen, Bonnie Raitt, and Simon & Garfunkel.
- Bridge VIII October 1 & October 2, 1994
  - Performers included: Neil Young and Crazy Horse, Tom Petty and the Heartbreakers, Pearl Jam, Pete Droge, Mazzy Star, Ministry, and Indigo Girls.
- Bridge IX October 28, 1995
  - Performers included: Neil Young, Bruce Springsteen, Beck, Emmylou Harris, Daniel Lanois, The Pretenders, and Hootie & The Blowfish. Blind Melon were originally scheduled to perform, but canceled after the death of Shannon Hoon one week before.
- Bridge X October 19 & October 20, 1996
  - Performers included: Neil Young and Crazy Horse, Pearl Jam, Bonnie Raitt, Billy Idol (Day 2 only), Pete Townshend (Day 1 only), David Bowie, Patti Smith, Cowboy Junkies, and Hayden.
- Bridge XI October 18 & October 19, 1997
  - Performers included: Neil Young, Metallica, Lou Reed, The Smashing Pumpkins, Alanis Morissette, Dave Matthews Band, Blues Traveler, Kacy Crowley, and Marilyn Manson as a surprise appearance.
- Bridge XII October 17 & October 18, 1998
  - Performers included: Neil Young, R.E.M., Phish, The Wallflowers, Sarah McLachlan, Barenaked Ladies, Jonathan Richman, Eels, and Pete Droge & Mike McCready (Day 2 only).
- Bridge XIII October 30 & October 31, 1999
  - Performers included: Neil Young, Pearl Jam, Emmylou Harris (Day 2 only), The Who, Sheryl Crow, Green Day, Billy Corgan & James Iha, Tom Waits (Day 1 only), Lucinda Williams, and Brian Wilson.
- Bridge XIV October 28 & October 29, 2000
  - Performers included: Crosby, Stills, Nash & Young, Tom Petty and the Heartbreakers, Beck, Dave Matthews Band, Robin Williams, Red Hot Chili Peppers, Foo Fighters, and Tegan and Sara.
- Bridge XV October 20 & October 21, 2001
  - Performers included: Neil Young and Crazy Horse, R.E.M., Pearl Jam, Tracy Chapman, Billy Idol, Dave Matthews, Ben Harper, and Jill Sobule.
- Bridge XVI October 26 & October 27, 2002
  - Performers included: Neil Young, James Taylor, Foo Fighters (Day 1 only), The Other Ones (Day 2 only), Ryan Adams, Tenacious D, Thom Yorke, LeAnn Rimes, Jack Johnson, and Vanessa Carlton.
- Bridge XVII October 25 & October 26, 2003
  - Performers included: Crosby, Stills, Nash & Young, Willie Nelson, Pearl Jam, Indigo Girls, Wilco, Counting Crows, Incubus, and Dashboard Confessional.
- Bridge XVIII October 23 & October 24, 2004
  - Performers included: Neil Young, Red Hot Chili Peppers, Sonic Youth, Ben Harper & the Innocent Criminals, Eddie Vedder, Tegan and Sara, Paul McCartney, Tony Bennett, and Los Lonely Boys.
- Bridge XIX October 29 & October 30, 2005
  - Performers included: Crosby, Stills, Nash & Young, Emmylou Harris, Dave Matthews & Tim Reynolds (Day 2 only), John Mellencamp (Day 1 only), Los Lobos, Norah Jones, Jerry Lee Lewis, Bright Eyes, and Good Charlotte.
- Bridge XX October 21 & October 22, 2006
  - Performers included: Neil Young, Dave Matthews Band, Pearl Jam, Brian Wilson, Foo Fighters, Trent Reznor, Death Cab for Cutie, Gillian Welch, and Devendra Banhart featuring Bert Jansch.
- Bridge XXI October 27 & October 28, 2007
  - Performers included: Neil Young, Metallica, Tom Waits with Kronos Quartet, My Morning Jacket, Tegan and Sara, Jerry Lee Lewis, John Mayer, and Regina Spektor. Eddie Vedder with Flea & Jack Irons were scheduled to perform but canceled due to a private family matter.
- Bridge XXII October 25 & October 26, 2008
  - Performers included: Neil Young, The Smashing Pumpkins (Day 2 only), Jack Johnson, Norah Jones, Wilco, Death Cab For Cutie, Sarah McLachlan (Day 1 only), Band of Horses (Day 1 only), Josh Groban (Day 2 only) and Cat Power. ZZ Top had been scheduled to perform on Day 1 but were dropped from the bill "due to a scheduling conflict." Band of Horses replaced ZZ Top in the lineup.
- Bridge XXIII October 24 & October 25, 2009
  - Performers included: Neil Young, No Doubt, Chris Martin, Sheryl Crow, Fleet Foxes, Wolfmother, Gavin Rossdale, Monsters of Folk, Jimmy Buffett (Day 1 only), and Adam Sandler (Day 2 only).
- Bridge XXIV October 23 & October 24, 2010
  - Performers included: Buffalo Springfield, Pearl Jam, Elvis Costello (Solo Day 1 only), Merle Haggard (canceled due to health) & Kris Kristofferson, Modest Mouse, Grizzly Bear, Lucinda Williams (Day 1 only), Billy Idol (Day 1 only), Jackson Browne & David Lindley (Day 1 only), T-Bone Burnett's Speaking Clock Revue featuring: Elton John, Leon Russell, Elvis Costello, Ralph Stanley, Neko Case, & Jeff Bridges (Day 2 Only), and guest appearances by Emmylou Harris (day 1 only) and Ramblin' Jack Elliott (day 2 finale only).
- Bridge XXV October 22 & October 23, 2011
  - Performers included: Neil Young, Arcade Fire, Dave Matthews and Tim Reynolds, Tony Bennett (Day 2 only), Foo Fighters (Day 2 only), Eddie Vedder, Mumford & Sons, Los Invisibles featuring Carlos Santana, Cindy Blackman Santana & Guests, Beck, Norah Jones and The Little Willies, and Devendra Banhart. Jimmy Fallon (MC for Saturday only (missed flight)), Diana Krall and Jenny Lewis were scheduled to perform but canceled.
- Bridge XXVI October 20 & October 21, 2012
  - Performers included: Neil Young and Crazy Horse, Guns N' Roses, Eddie Vedder, Jack White, The Flaming Lips, Sarah McLachlan, Foster the People, Lucinda Williams, Steve Martin and the Steep Canyon Rangers, k.d. lang and the Siss Boom Bang, Gary Clark Jr., Ray LaMontagne
- Bridge XXVII October 26 & October 27, 2013
  - Performers included: Crosby, Stills, Nash & Young, Arcade Fire (Day 1 Only), Queens of the Stone Age, Jack Johnson (Day 1 only), My Morning Jacket, Tom Waits (Day 2 only), Elvis Costello, Diana Krall, fun., Heart, and Jenny Lewis with the Watson Twins. The Killers were originally scheduled to perform on Day 1 but canceled.
- Bridge XXVIII October 25 & October 26, 2014
  - Performers included: Neil Young, Pearl Jam, Brian Wilson, Florence & The Machine, Tom Jones, Soundgarden, Norah Jones & Puss n Boots, Band of Horses, Pegi Young & the Survivors
- Bridge XXIX October 24 & October 25, 2015
  - Performers included: Neil Young, The Chicks, Ryan Adams, Sheryl Crow, St. Vincent, Gary Clark Jr., Spoon, Nils Lofgren (Day 1 Only) and Ben Harper.
- Bridge XXX October 22 & October 23, 2016
  - Performers included: Neil Young, Metallica, Roger Waters, Dave Matthews, My Morning Jacket, Willie Nelson, Norah Jones, Cage the Elephant, Nils Lofgren
