= Bridge School (California) =

Nonprofit organization

Coordinates: 37°34′06″N 122°21′45″W

The Bridge School is a non-profit organization in Hillsborough, California for children with severe speech and physical impairments. It aims to allow the children to achieve full participation in their communities through Augmentative and Alternative Communication (AAC) and Assistive Technologies (AT). The school was founded by Pegi Young, Jim Forderer and Dr. Marilyn Buzolich in 1986, and has since become a world recognized leader in AAC and AT.

== History ==
The Bridge School was founded by Pegi Young, Jim Forderer and speech and language pathologist, Dr. Marilyn Buzolich. Pegi Young was inspired to start the school after she was unable to find a suitable school placement for her non-verbal son, Ben Young, who has cerebral palsy. The school opened in 1987 after funds were raised from the 1st Annual Bridge School Benefit concert in 1986. The first student graduated from the school in 1991. A permanent building was constructed for the school on the campus of North Elementary School in 1995 and affords students at the school the opportunity to participate in the general education environment. In 1997, a Teacher in Residence program was established, bringing teachers from countries where the use of AAC and AT is still in its infancy to the school for a year-long placement. This program has since brought teachers from India, Poland, Singapore, Mexico, South Korea and South Africa among other countries. The school opened its preschool program in 2003.

== Benefit Concert ==
One of the organization's main sources of funding is the annual benefit concert which was held every fall at Shoreline Amphitheatre, Mountain View. It is an acoustic non-profit charity concert organized by Neil Young and his wife Pegi Young (Bridge School founder). The first concert was held in 1986 to support the opening of the school, and it was held every year, with the exception of 1987, until 2016. Featured artists included Phish, Thom Yorke, Green Day, The Smashing Pumpkins, Pearl Jam, David Bowie, Metallica, Elton John, Foo Fighters, Bob Dylan, The Beach Boys, Mumford & Sons, Florence Welch, and Tom Petty and The Heartbreakers. Neil Young was heavily involved in the organization and promotion of the concert and performed every year.

In 2011, a critically acclaimed CD and DVD compilation containing highlights from the concerts was released to commemorate the organizations' 25th Anniversary. There have also been numerous iTunes collections released to raise funds for the school. In 2017, following their 2014 divorce, Neil and Pegi Young announced that they would no longer host the benefit concert, citing "personal reasons."
