= Lucky Thirteen (Neil Young album) =

Compilation album by Neil Young
- Released: January 5, 1993
- Recorded: September 11, 1981 – April 23, 1988
- Venues: Hara Arena, Dayton; The Agora Ballroom, Cleveland; The Palace, Hollywood
- Studio: Various
- Genres: Rock; electronica; rockabilly; country
- Length: 1:04:10
- Label: Geffen
- Producers: David Briggs; Elliot Mazer; Neil Young; Tim Mulligan; Ben Keith; Danny Kortchmar; Niko Bolas

Neil Young chronology
Harvest Moon (1992)	Lucky Thirteen (1993)	Unplugged (1993)

Professional ratings
Review scores
Source	Rating
AllMusic	3/5 stars
Robert Christgau	A−
Orlando Sentinel	2/3 stars
Rolling Stone	4/5 stars

Lucky Thirteen is a compilation album by Canadian / American musician Neil Young, released in 1993. It contains thirteen of Young's Geffen-era songs released between 1982 and 1988, including five tracks that were previously unreleased, and three that are slightly different edits to their original versions.

It was the first Neil Young album (solo or otherwise) not to be distributed by Warner Music Group. Two years after Young's departure from Geffen, the label, originally distributed by Warner Bros. Records, was sold to MCA Music Entertainment. Young's Geffen-era recordings, now owned by Universal Music Group, represent the only works in his catalog that are not owned by Warner Music Group, with which he has had a long-standing relationship, dating to when his first band Buffalo Springfield was signed to Atco Records (which was actually not a sister label to WBR at the time of the signing, only becoming so in 1967).

== Track listing ==
All tracks are written by Neil Young.

No.	Title	Length
1.	"Sample And Hold" (With Crazy Horse. Previously unreleased version; original shorter version from Trans, 1982)	8:05
2.	"Transformer Man" (Short edit)	3:20
3.	"Depression Blues" (With The Harvesters & The Redwood Boys. Previously unreleased; from the original Old Ways, 1983)	4:07
4.	"Get Gone" (Previously unreleased; live with the Shocking Pinks – Hara Arena, Dayton - 18 September 1983)	5:06
5.	"Don't Take Your Love Away From Me" (Previously unreleased; live with the Shocking Pinks – Hara Arena, Dayton - 18 September 1983)	6:16
6.	"Once An Angel"	3:54
7.	"Where Is The Highway Tonight?"	3:05
8.	"Hippie Dream" (Long edit)	4:27
9.	"Pressure"	2:46
10.	"Around The World" (With Crazy Horse.)	5:29
11.	"Mideast Vacation" (With Crazy Horse.)	4:22
12.	"Ain't It The Truth" (Previously unreleased; live with the Bluenotes – The Agora Ballroom, Cleveland - 23 April 1988)	7:39
13.	"This Note's For You" (Previously unreleased version; live with the Bluenotes - The Palace, Hollywood - 13 April 1988)	5:34
Total length:		1:04:10

== Personnel ==
- Neil Young – guitar, bass, synclavier, vocoder, electric piano, harmonica, vocals
- Ralph Molina – drums, vocals
- Frank Sampedro – guitar, keyboards
- Karl Himmel – drums
- Tim Drummond – bass
- Ben Keith – pedal steel guitar, slide guitar, guitar, alto saxophone, vocals
- Rufus Thibodeaux – fiddle
- Spooner Oldham – organ
- Anthony Crawford – maracas, vocals
- Rick Palombi – tambourine, vocals
- Craig Hayes – baritone saxophone
- Waylon Jennings – guitar, vocals
- Gordon Terry – fiddle
- Joe Allen – bass
- Hargus "Pig" Robbins – piano
- Ralph Mooney – pedal steel guitar
- David Kirby – guitar
- Danny Kortchmar – guitar, synthesizer, vocals
- Steve Jordan – drums, synthesizer, vocals
- Billy Talbot – bass
- Chad Cromwell – drums
- Rick "The Bass Player" Rosas – bass
- Steve Lawrence – tenor saxophone
- Larry Cragg – baritone saxophone
- Claude Cailliet – trombone
- John Fumo – trumpet
- Tom Bray – trumpet

Additional roles

- Mike Lawson – photography
- Kevin Reogan – art direction
- F. Ron Miller – art design
- Joel Bernstein – production coordination
- Tim Mulligan – mastering
- John Hausmann – production assistance
- Elliot Roberts – direction

== Charts ==
Chart (1993)	Peak position
Dutch Albums (Album Top 100)	73
Finnish Albums (Suomen virallinen lista)	34
German Albums (Offizielle Top 100)	69
UK Albums (Official Charts)	69
