= Harvest Moon (album) =

Studio album by Neil Young
- Released: November 2, 1992
- Recorded: September 1991 – February 1992
- Studios: Redwood Digital, Woodside (Note: All songs recorded at Redwood Digital, Woodside, except "Natural Beauty" at Civic Auditorium, Portland, Oregon. Strings on "Such a Woman" recorded at Sunset Sound, Hollywood, California.)
- Genres: Roots rock; folk rock; country rock
- Length: 51:39
- Label: Reprise
- Producers: Neil Young; Ben Keith

Neil Young chronology
Arc (1991)	Harvest Moon (1992)	Lucky Thirteen (1993)

Singles from Harvest Moon
- 1. "Harvest Moon" / "Old King" Released: October 1992

Professional ratings
Review scores
Source	Rating
AllMusic	3.5/5 stars
Calgary Herald	A−
Entertainment Weekly	B+
Los Angeles Times	4/4 stars
NME	7/10
Orlando Sentinel	2/3 stars
Rolling Stone	4/5 stars
The Vancouver Sun	3/5 stars
The Windsor Star	B+

Harvest Moon is the twenty-first studio album by Canadian-American musician Neil Young, released on November 2, 1992. Many of its backing musicians also appeared on Young's 1972 album Harvest.

== Background ==
Recovering from a case of tinnitus that had come about after the recording of Ragged Glory (1990) and its subsequent tour (which produced the 1991 albums Weld and Arc), Young returned to the studio with Ben Keith, picking up the acoustic guitar, piano and banjo that had dominated albums such as Harvest, Comes a Time and Old Ways. 1970s-era analogue equipment was used instead of digital recording to achieve a "warmer" feel, though the board used was Sony PCM 16/44.1 kHz digital.

The album's title and style drew comparisons to Young's 1972 career pinnacle Harvest. Young discussed the idea of making a follow up to Harvest in a 1992 Rolling Stone interview with Alan Light: "People had been asking me to do it for twenty years, and I never could figure out what it was in the first place. It just happened again, whatever it was that happened back then. But only because the songs made me do it."

== Writing ==
Like many of the songs on its predecessor Harvest, the songs are largely inspired by relationships. This time, many of the lyrics reflect the maturer perspective of a long-term partnership. Some of the songs are new compositions, while others revisit material Young had first worked on during the previous decade. He explains in a contemporary interview:

"There's two groups of songs on the record: those that I started a long time ago and were finished in 1991 or '92, and those that were written entirely in other years. For example, "One Of These Days" was written in '85, "Natural Beauty" and "Dreamin' Man" in '89, "Unknown Legend" was '82 and '92. All different periods. I also composed a couple of songs last summer while on vacation with my wife and kids in Evergreen, Colorado. I wrote "War Of Man" and I finished "You And Me," which I started in 1975. There were 17 or 18 possibilities for Harvest Moon. The songs that didn't make the cut are just waiting for something else, I guess."

"Unknown Legend" is a portrait of Young's wife Pegi, whom he met working at a diner in 1974. He began writing the song in the mid-1970s but did not complete the song until fifteen years later. Young remembers in his memoir, Special Deluxe:

"Back in 1974, there was a bar up on Skyline Boulevard, California Highway 35, located on the ridge above the ranch. It was called Alex's, and Pegi was working there. Alex's was the place where 'I used to order just to watch her walk across the floor.' It's funny to see how a song can start out in fact and go completely to fantasy but then still be there, in the moment. "Unknown Legend," as sometimes happens, starts out with a factual reference and just goes off into a world that opens up for me once the music starts. This song was a memory that returned to me when I found its lyrics written on an old newspaper fifteen years after I had written it. Soon the melody and chords came rushing back. When I picked up Hank, my old Martin D-28 that once belonged to Hank Williams, the song flowed as if it had always been there. When I finished it and recorded it for Harvest Moon around 1990, Ben Keith's playing was among the most beautiful I had ever heard."

Photographer and archivist Joel Bernstein helped bring the song back to Young's attention: "Unknown Legend" actually was a song Joel brought me; he kept bringing me the lyrics and saying, 'What is this thing?' I said, It's a song I started back in '82. I don't think I ever finished it.' He kept bringing it back to me, and one day I picked up my guitar and finished it right there. But that doesn't happen very often with me. The real good ones come right away, just in one sitting."

"From Hank to Hendrix" uses cultural references to measure time in a relationship. Young recalls the process of writing the song in a contemporary interview: "I wrote the song in my house. I sat down with my 12 string guitar and just started playing and writing all at once. I don't think about it. I just do it. I don't think 'now I'm going to sit down and write a song' and then sit down and try to write a song. I didn't know I was going to write a song when I sat down. I'll pick up my guitar and start playing and then suddenly I am playing a new song. I've learned to realize when I'm writing and then remember what I'm doing."

The genesis of "You and Me" dates from the Harvest era. The chorus was first performed during the intro to "I Am a Child" at a February 1971 solo acoustic concert at the Dorothy Chandler Pavilion in Los Angeles. Young explains: "That song was started in 1975, but I never finished it. In 1976, Tim Drummond heard it and said: 'You've got to finish that, man. That's like Harvest stuff, let's do that.' And that kinda freaked me out, I got spooked by it, because it was like someone said what it was before we did it. I don't want to feel like I'm just filling in the numbers."

"Harvest Moon" celebrates a lasting relationship. In a 2021 post to the Neil Young Archives website, Young confirms that the song is about his marriage with Pegi: "'Harvest Moon' is a song I wrote for Pegi, my wife of many years, who gave me two beautiful children and helped bring up my first child Zeke. She was a dancer and floated around when she was happy."

The song "Old King" memorializes Neil's dog Elvis.

The lyrics to "Natural Beauty" simultaneously celebrate both a woman's beauty and the beauty of nature. The track was recorded live with later overdubs. Young tells NME in a contemporary interview:

"Natural Beauty" is about survival in nature in general and survival of any situation, there's many things in it. The subject of this song is meandering, it's kind of a trip through space. It's like I took a completed album of all kinds of different songs and threw it up in the air and it came crashing down. I took all the pieces and put them back together again. It's a live tape I overdubbed on, added all kinds of acoustic instruments to. Doing "Natural Beauty" live in Portland and singing it all the way through, I nailed it right there. There was no sense in trying to do a better one. I know I got it when I was doing things with the structure I'd never been able to do again."

== Recording ==
The album was recorded in late September, 1991 at the Redwood Digital studio located in a barn on Young's ranch in Woodside, California. For the album, Young convened the group of musicians that had backed him on the previous albums Harvest and Comes a Time. The group, dubbed the Stray Gators, includes pedal steel guitarist Ben Keith, bassist Tim Drummond, drummer Kenny Buttrey and pianist Spooner Oldham, as well as vocalists Nicolette Larson, Linda Ronstadt and James Taylor. Young's half-sister Astrid Young also sings on the album. Jack Nitzsche arranged an 18 piece string section for the track "Such a Woman". For the album, Young sought to re-create an echoed sound that he had achieved at Sunset Sound while recording "I Believe in You" and "Oh, Lonesome Me" for After the Gold Rush.

== Promotion ==
In 1992, Young toured North America playing a solo acoustic set featuring songs from the album as well as from his back catalogue. A compilation of performances from the tour was released on the 2009 Dreamin' Man live album, containing solo renditions of each of the Harvest Moon tracks in a different order. Young would also record a set for MTV Unplugged, which was released as an album in 1993.

== Reception ==
Music website Classic Rock Review named Harvest Moon its album of the year for 1992. It earned the 1994 Juno Award for album of the year. Matthew Greenwald of AllMusic described the melody of the title track as "positively gorgeous". The album continued Young's commercial and critical resurgence following Freedom and Ragged Glory, eventually outselling both of those records. The song "Harvest Moon" topped the AARP's list of "16 Songs Everyone Over 50 Should Own."

== Track listing ==
All tracks written by Neil Young.

No.	Title	Length
1.	"Unknown Legend"	4:32
2.	"From Hank to Hendrix"	5:12
3.	"You and Me"	3:45
4.	"Harvest Moon"	5:03
5.	"War of Man"	5:41
6.	"One of These Days"	4:55
7.	"Such a Woman"	4:36
8.	"Old King"	2:57
9.	"Dreamin' Man"	4:36
10.	"Natural Beauty" (recorded live at The Civic Auditorium, Portland, Oregon, January 23, 1992)	10:22

== Personnel ==
- Neil Young – vocals, guitars, harmonica, banjo guitar, piano, pump organ, vibraphone, production, mixing

The Stray Gators

- Ben Keith – pedal steel guitar, Dobro, bass marimba, backing vocals, production
- Spooner Oldham – piano, pump organ, keyboards
- Tim Drummond – bass guitar, marimba, broom
- Kenny Buttrey – drums

Additional personnel

- Larry Cragg – backing vocals on "War of Man", photography
- Nicolette Larson – backing vocals on "You and Me", "War of Man", "Such a Woman", "Old King", "Dreamin' Man" and "Natural Beauty"
- Linda Ronstadt – backing vocals on "Unknown Legend", "From Hank to Hendrix", "Harvest Moon", "War of Man" and "One of These Days"
- James Taylor – backing vocals on "From Hank to Hendrix", "War of Man" and "One of These Days"
- Astrid Young – backing vocals on "War of Man", "Such a Woman" and "Dreamin' Man"
- Jack Nitzsche – string arrangement on "Such a Woman"
- Suzie Katayama – conductor on "Such a Woman"
- Maria Newman – concertmaster on "Such a Woman"
- Maria Newman, Israel Baker, Betty Byers, Berg Garabedian, Harris Goldman, Robin Lorentz, Cindy McGurty, Haim Shtrum – violins on "Such a Woman"
- Valerie Dimond, Matt Funes, Rick Gerding, Carrie Prescott, David Stenske, Adriana Zoppo – violas on "Such a Woman"
- Larry Corbett, Ericka Duke, Greg Gottlieb, David Shamban – cellos on "Such a Woman"

Additional roles

- Joel Bernstein – photography, art direction
- Janet Levinson – art direction & design
- Tim Mulligan – engineering, mixing, editing, mastering
- John Nowland – engineering, mixing
- John Hausmann – assistant engineering
- Elliot Roberts – direction

== Charts ==
=== Weekly charts ===
Weekly chart performance for Harvest Moon
Chart (1992)	Peak position
Australian Albums (ARIA)	40
Austrian Albums (Ö3 Austria)	20
Canada Top Albums/CDs (RPM)	4
Dutch Albums (Album Top 100)	23
Finnish Albums (Suomen virallinen lista)	18
German Albums (Offizielle Top 100)	34
New Zealand Albums (RMNZ)	7
Norwegian Albums (VG-lista)	6
Swedish Albums (Sverigetopplistan)	13
Swiss Albums (Schweizer Hitparade)	31
UK Albums (Official Charts)	9
US Billboard 200	16

=== Year-end charts ===
Chart (1993)	Position
New Zealand Albums (RMNZ)	41

== Certifications ==
Region	Certification	Certified units/sales
Australia (ARIA)	Gold	35,000^{^}
Canada (Music Canada)	5× Platinum	500,000^{^}
United Kingdom (BPI)	Gold	100,000^{^}
United States (RIAA)	2× Platinum	2,000,000^{^}
^{^} Shipments figures based on certification alone.

== Covers ==
Jazz singer Cassandra Wilson recorded a rendition of "Harvest Moon" for her 1995 album New Moon Daughter

American folk band the Brothers Comatose, featuring AJ Lee & Blue Summit, recorded a cover of "Harvest Moon" in 2022.

American singers Ann Wilson and Alison Krauss recorded a cover of "War of Man" for Wilson's 2007 album Hope & Glory.

Los Angeles electronic production duo Poolside recorded a cover of "Harvest Moon" for their 2012 album Pacific Standard Time

American folk duo Shovels & Rope recorded "Unknown Legend" with Shakey Graves in 2015.

Los Angeles indie rock band Lord Huron recorded a cover of "Harvest Moon" in 2018 for a Spotify Singles session.

Jazz guitarist Bill Frisell recorded a version of "One of These Days" on his 1997 album Nashville.

Tunde Adebimpe, the lead singer of TV on The Radio, performs an a cappella version of Unknown Legend in the Jonathan Demme film Rachel Getting Married.

== See also ==
- Dreamin' Man Live '92, a live version of Harvest Moon, recorded on tour in 1992 and released in 2009
