= Astrid Young =

Canadian musician (born 1962)

- Born: Vendela Astrid Paterson Young; August 16, 1962 (age 63)
- Occupations: Musician, artist, author, sommelier
- Spouse: Ray Farrugia
- Relatives: Scott Young (father); Neil Young (half-brother)
- Website: www.astridyoung.net

Vendela Astrid Young (born August 16, 1962) is a Canadian musician, artist, author and sommelier. She is the daughter of journalist, sportswriter, and novelist Scott Young and his second wife Astrid Carlson, and the half-sister of fellow musician Neil Young.

== Musical career ==
External videos
- Morning chats with singer, songwriter, author Astrid Young" (2023) – Global News - (6:02 min)

After her stint with the band Ohm & the Secret Sources in Canada, Young moved to Los Angeles in the mid '80s, where she joined the glam metal band Sacred Child as lead vocalist. The 90s saw the release of her first solo album Brainflower in 1995, followed by Matinee in 2002, and Night at Giant Rock in 2014 and collaborations in the 90s with bands such as Blackthorne and Dramarama She was lead vocalist and bassists for the rock band iST's on their album Pokalolo Paniolo in the early 2000s.

Young has collaborated with her brother (Neil Young) over many decades, including on the albums Unplugged, Road Rock Vol. 1 the Grammy-nominated Harvest Moon and Are You Passionate? while performing live together around the world.

As a session musician, Young has appeared on a multitude of albums, collaborating, co-writing and performing with many iconic musicians, including Johnny Cash, Nancy Wilson, Bernie Taupin, Nicolette Larson, Lisa Dalbello, Martin Page, West Arkeen, Graham Bonnet, Gerry Goffin, and her husband Ray Farrugia a founding member of the Canadian rock bands Junkhouse and Lee Harvey Osmond.

=== Selective discography ===
The following is a listing of Astrid Young's most recognized recordings.

Year	Artist	Title	Record label	Nature of Appearance
1984	Ohm and the Secret Sources	Exit from a Dream	Ohm Records	Bass & Background Vocals
1986	Sacred Child	Sacred Child	Target Records	Lead Vocals
1989	Sacred Child	Sacred Child (re-release)	CBS/Black Dragon	Lead Vocals
1994	Blackthorne	Afterlife	CMC International	Background Vocals
1992	Neil Young	Harvest Moon	Reprise Records	Background Vocals
1993	Ben Keith	Seven Gates	Reprise Records	Background Vocals
1993	Dramarama	Hi-Fi Sci-Fi	Chameleon	Background Vocals
1993	Neil Young	Unplugged	Reprise Records	Background Vocals
1993	Neil Young	Event of the Season	n/a (bootleg)	Background Vocals
1995	Astrid Young	Brainflower	Independent	Lead Vocals, Keyboards
1995	Nancy Wilson	Live at McCabe's	Epic Records	Background Vocals
1996	Scott Joss	Souvenirs	Little Dog Records	Background Vocals
1997	Shrubbers	National Boulevard	Independent	Background Vocals
1997	Sacred Child	Sacred Child	Must Have Records	Lead Vocals
2000	Neil Young	Road Rock Vol. 1	Reprise Records	Background Vocals
2002	iST	Pokalolo Paniolo	War of the Gargantuas/Inbetweens	Lead Vocals & Bass
2002	Neil Young	Are You Passionate?	Reprise Records	Background Vocals
2002	Astrid Young	Matinee	Inbetweens Records	Acoustic Guitar & Lead Vocals
2003	Ad Vanderveen	The Moment That Matters	Blue Rose	Background Vocals
2003	Rebecca Trujillo	Munda	Munda Music	Keyboards
2003	Various Artists	Spiders from Venus	Skipping Discs	performed a cover of David Bowie's song "Modern Love"
2013	Lee Harvey Osmond	The Folk Sinner	Latent Recordings	Vocals
2014	Astrid Young	One Night at Giant Rock	War of the Gargantuas/W.O.T.G. Omnimedia	solo album/vocals/bass/guitar/production

=== Videos ===
- Neil Young & Crazy Horse: The Complex Sessions (1995)
- Neil Young MTV Unplugged (1993)
- Neil Young: Friends and Relatives – Red Rocks Live (2000)

== Other ventures ==
External videos
- Interview with Astrid Young " (2009) – Breakfast Television on YouTube - (6:02 min)

Aside from touring and recording, Young is a certified sommelier amassing award-winning wine collections and has served as a wine judge. Young has been a "director of wine" for numerous establishments near her homesteads in Toronto and Picton, Ontario, the latter is where she maintains her art gallery. Young both wrote and starred in a short film titled Haunted in 2001. This was followed in 2007 by a best-selling memoir titled Being Young - Scott, Neil and Me about Young's childhood, her relationship with her father, brother and her own singer-songwriter career and journey to become an internationally recognized sommelier.

== Bibliography ==
- Young, A. (2007). Being Young. Insomniac Press. ISBN 978-1-897178-45-4.
