= Scott Young (writer) =

Canadian journalist, sportswriter, and novelist (1918–2005)

- Born: April 14, 1918; Cypress River, Manitoba, Canada
- Died: June 12, 2005 (aged 87); Kingston, Ontario, Canada
- Occupations: Journalist, sportswriter, author, broadcaster
- Children: Neil Young; Astrid Young

Scott Alexander Young (April 14, 1918 – June 12, 2005) was a Canadian journalist, sportswriter, and novelist. He was the father of musicians Neil Young and Astrid Young. Over his career, Young wrote 45 books, including novels and non-fiction for adult and youth audiences.

== Early life ==
Born in Cypress River, Manitoba, Young grew up in nearby Glenboro, Manitoba, where his father, Percy Andrew Young, owned a drug store. His mother was Jean Ferguson Paterson. After his father went broke in 1926, the family moved to Winnipeg, but was unable to afford to stay there. His parents separated in 1930, and he went to live with an aunt and uncle in Prince Albert, Saskatchewan, for a year before moving back to Winnipeg to live with his mother.

Young began writing while in his teens, submitting stories to various publications, most of which were rejected. At the age of 18, in 1936, he was hired as a copyboy at the Winnipeg Free Press and was soon made sports reporter. He met Edna Blow "Rassy" Ragland in 1937 and the two were married in 1940.

== Moves to Toronto ==
Unable to get a raise at the Free Press, Young moved to Toronto in 1941, covering news and sports for the Canadian Press news agency. His first son, Bob Young, was born in 1942 and five months later, Young was sent to England to help cover World War II for CP. He came back a year later and joined the Royal Canadian Naval Reserves, where he served as a Communications Officer until his release from the service when the war ended in 1945. Young returned to CP and soon joined Maclean's magazine as an assistant editor. His second son, Neil Young, was born in Toronto in November 1945.

In 1955, Scott Young authored “The Way Up”, an account of the 10-year history of A. V. Roe Canada Limited. Page 28 of the account says: '“The Author – Scott Young, 37, has had his stories published in most of the principal magazines in Canada, the United States and Britain; and in translations in many European countries. His fourth book, a novel with a background of the Winnipeg flood of 1950, will be published in 1956. Commenting on the A.V. Roe Canada story, Mr. Young said: “The single unhappy part of finishing this story is in realizing that I didn’t have room to mention other hundreds of people who made significant contributions to this company.””'

The Flood was the first novel by Scott Young, and was published by McClelland and Stewart Limited, Toronto, Ontario, Canada, 1956.

== Life on the farm ==
In 1967, Young bought a 100-acre (0.40 km^{2}) farm near Omemee in Cavan Township and built a house there. In 1969, he asked to be transferred to the Globe's news bureau in Ottawa. Shortly after arriving in Ottawa, he got into a dispute with his paper over the publication rights to excerpts from a book he had just written with Punch Imlach. The rights had been acquired by the Toronto Telegram, but the Globe wouldn't allow Young's writing to appear in a competing newspaper. He quit the Globe and accepted a job offer from Bassett to become sports editor and columnist at the Telegram, moving back to Toronto within weeks of his move to Ottawa. Young remained at the Telegram until the paper folded in 1971. He then rejoined the Globe and Mail. Young and his second wife separated in 1976, and in the fall of 1977, he moved in with fellow Globe writer Margaret Hogan. The two married in 1980. At the same time, Young had a falling out with the Globe over stories critical of Imlach written by Donald Ramsay and quit.

In 1980s, he wrote a series of detective stories that featured Inuit detective Matthew "Matteesie" Kitologitak, including "The Shaman's Knife" and "Murder in A Cold Climate".

In 1988, Young received the Elmer Ferguson Memorial Award from the Hockey Hall of Fame as selected by the Professional Hockey Writers' Association. He was later inducted into the Manitoba Hockey Hall of Fame.

Young and his wife sold the farm in the late 1980s and moved to Howth, Ireland, a suburb of North Dublin. In 1990, Young received an honorary doctorate from Trent University and donated many of his papers to the university's archives. The Youngs returned to Omemee in 1992 and repurchased their old farm, which Young owned for the rest of his life. Scott Young Public School in Omemee was named in his honour in 1993. His autobiography, A Writer's Life, was published in 1994.

He wrote a book on his life with his son Neil, Neil and Me, in 1984.

He and Margaret moved to Kingston, Ontario, in 2004, where he died the following year at age 87.
