= Unknown Legend =

Promotional single by Neil Young

from the album Harvest Moon
- Released: November 2, 1992
- Recorded: January 30, 1992
- Studio: Redwood Digital
- Genre: Rock; country rock; folk rock
- Length: 4:32
- Label: Reprise
- Songwriter: Neil Young
- Producers: Neil Young; Ben Keith

Neil Young singles chronology
"Harvest Moon" (1992)	"Unknown Legend" (1992)	"The Needle and the Damage Done" (live) (1993)

"Unknown Legend" is a song written by Neil Young that was first released on his 1992 album Harvest Moon. Although it was only released as a promotional single, it reached #38 on the Billboard Mainstream Rock Tracks chart.

== Music and lyrics ==
Although "Unknown Legend" was not released until 1992, it was written earlier, closer to the release of Young's 1978 album Comes a Time, and several critics have noted a similarity between the style of "Unknown Legend" and the material on Comes a Time, particularly the song "Motorcycle Mama". AllMusic critic Matthew Greenwald describes the song as being based on a "simple, folksy guitar riff and melody". As with several other songs on Harvest Moon, Linda Ronstadt provided backup vocals in the refrains. Ben Keith plays pedal steel, in a performance that Young biographer Jimmy McDonough describes as providing "proud but sad" accents.

The lyrics describe a woman who had worked in a diner and rode a Harley Davidson, but now is raising two children. The lyrics were inspired by multiple people. Nigel Williamson feels that the lyric about how the woman used to work in a diner was inspired by Young's first wife Susan Acevedo and that the lyrics about an "unknown legend" who is raising two kids but still has "the far away look in her eyes" were inspired by his later wife Pegi Young, and music critic Johnny Rogan agrees that the character described by the lyrics seems to be a combination of the two. Young biographer Glen Boyd similarly sees a portrait of Pegi in the lyrics about working in a diner and raising two kids, as well as in a line about "her long blonde hair flowin' in the wind." Nonetheless, Young has described his inspiration as being more expansive, stating:

It's inspired by some people I know and some people I don't know and all kinds of things put together...They're just pictures, people's lives. A lot of the common thing is survival, not losing what it is you were when you were young, but take it with you, take it with you into your own age. Don't leave it behind.

Young biographer David Downing sees the song as one of several on Harvest Moon that describe Americans feeling a deep sense of loss for unknown reasons in 1992.

== Reception ==
In a 2016 Rolling Stone magazine readers poll, "Unknown Legend" ranked as Young's 4th best post-1970s song. It reached #38 on the Billboard Mainstream Rock Tracks chart.

AllMusic critic Stephen Thomas Erlewine considers "Unknown Legend" to be one of Young's best songs, describing it as "lovely". McDonough describes it as "perhaps the empathetic portrait of a woman [Young has] ever created. Greenwald calls the arrangement "exquisite" and comments how the lyrics provide a "clear" and "cinematic" picture of the female protagonist.

== Live performances ==
Young performed "Unknown Legend" for his 1993 MTV Unplugged concert and it was included on his Unplugged album. For the Unplugged concert, Astrid Young and Nicolette Larson performed the backing vocal that Ronstadt performed on the Harvest Moon album. Young later played the song live on his 2015 tour.

== Popular culture ==
The song was performed by Tunde Adebimpe, of the band TV on the Radio, in the 2008 film Rachel Getting Married starring Anne Hathaway.

== Personnel ==
- Neil Young – guitar, harmonica, vocals
- Linda Ronstadt – vocals
- Tim Drummond – bass
- Kenny Buttrey – drums
- Ben Keith – pedal steel guitar
- Spooner Oldham – piano
