= Pegi Young =

American singer, songwriter, environmentalist, philanthropist

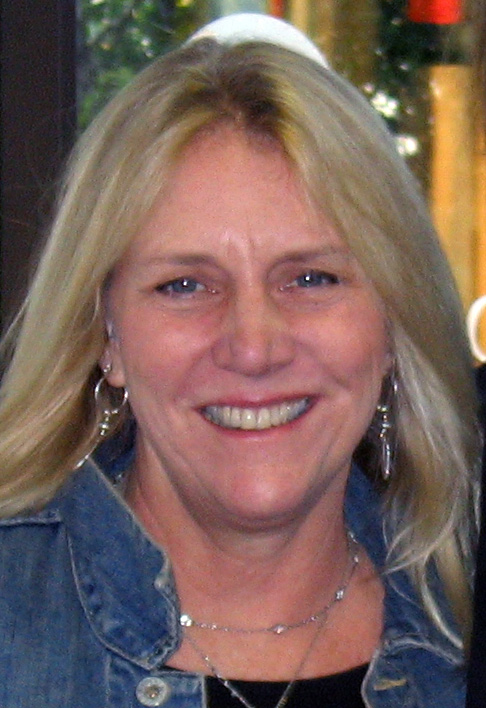
- Born: Margaret Mary Morton; December 1, 1952; San Mateo, California, U.S.
- Died: January 1, 2019 (aged 66); Mountain View, California, U.S.
- Other name: Pegi Morton Young
- Occupations: Singer; songwriter; educator; philanthropist
- Years active: 1983–2019
- Spouse: Neil Young (m. 1978; div. 2014)
- Musical career
- Genres: Folk rock; country; jazz
- Instruments: Vocals; guitar; vibes
- Label: Vapor/Warner Bros.

Margaret Mary "Pegi" Young (née Morton, December 1, 1952 – January 1, 2019) was an American singer, songwriter, environmentalist, educator and philanthropist.

== Music career ==
After marrying Canadian folk rock musician Neil Young in 1978, her debut as a singer came in 1983 when she was a member of The Pinkettes, the backing vocalists on her husband's rockabilly Shocking Pinks tour. In 1994 she made her first nationwide TV appearance at the Academy Awards, singing backup on Neil's song "Philadelphia", nominated for an Oscar.

The Youngs performed together at a number of their annual Bridge School Benefit Concerts. Young joined her then husband on his 2000 tour as a backup singer.

In 2007, after recording songs in her home studio at the Broken Arrow Ranch, she released her self-titled debut album. Young followed it with the albums Foul Deeds (2010), and Bracing for Impact (2011). She toured and performed with her band The Survivors, which included Spooner Oldham on piano, Rick Rosas on bass, Kelvin Holly on guitar and drummer Phil Jones.

== Philanthropy ==
In 1986, Young co-founded the Bridge School, an educational program aimed at serving the needs of children with severe physical and speech impairments.

She was inspired to create the school based on her experiences with her son Ben, who was born with cerebral palsy, a congenital condition that can be influenced by hereditary factors. For Ben, the condition resulted in severe speech difficulties and motor impairment. Pegi and her husband Neil said they searched for educational institutions tailored for children like Ben with physical and learning impairments, but were frustrated to find that none really existed.

Young founded the school with additional help from Jim Forderer, a fellow parent of a child with specialized educational needs, and Dr. Marilyn Buzolich.

The Youngs raised awareness of their newly founded school with their Bridge School Benefit Concert, which ran annually from 1986 until 2016, bringing in musicians such as Edward Van Halen, Sammy Hagar, Mazzy Star, Arcade Fire, Mumford & Sons, Tony Bennett, Bruce Springsteen, Lucinda Williams, Jack White and Metallica. Graduates from the Bridge School have often returned to their home school districts and continued their education once their basic educational needs were met in the Bridge School's more specialized setting.

She served in the capacity of executive director of the Bridge School for seven years, and as president of the board of directors since its inception in 1986 until her death.

== Educational outreach ==
Young served on the board of A.R.T. (Artistic Realization Technologies), an organization dedicated to bringing avenues for creative expression through art into the lives of individuals with severe disabilities. She was on the Advisory Board of the "virtual" AAC-RERC and on the Advisory Council for Lemelson Assistive Technology and Design Center on the campus of Hampshire College.

Young served for four years on the board of the Alliance for Technology Access, a grassroots organization of 43 community based centers around the country serving individuals with disabilities, aimed at increasing their independence through the use of technology.

== Environmentalism ==
Young performed at and hosted Farm Aid with her then-husband Neil in 2007 and in 2012, and, in 2013, began serving on the board of directors of Rainforest Connection, an organization aimed at preventing deforestation by using real-time data collection to maximize the effectiveness of ground enforcement.

== Personal life and death ==
Young was born Margaret Mary Morton in San Mateo, California, on December 1, 1952 to Thomas and Margaret Jean (Foley) Morton.

Young met future husband Neil Young in 1974 when she was working as a waitress at a diner near his ranch, a story he tells in the 1992 song "Unknown Legend". They married in August 1978 and had two children, Ben and Amber, in addition to her becoming stepmother to his first child, Zeke. Both Ben and Zeke were diagnosed with cerebral palsy, and Amber with epilepsy. In July 2014, Neil filed for divorce in California.

Young died of cancer on January 1, 2019, aged 66, in Mountain View, California.

== Discography ==
- 2007 – Pegi Young
- 2010 – Foul Deeds
- 2012 – Bracing for Impact (with The Survivors)
- 2014 – Lonely in a Crowded Room (with The Survivors)
- 2016 – Raw (with The Survivors)

== Awards ==
- Induction into the San Mateo County Women's Hall of Fame, 1995
- Co-honored with Neil Young for their work with the Bridge School by Rock the Vote, 1999
