= Harvest Moon (Neil Young song) =

Single by Neil Young

from the album Harvest Moon
- B-side: "Old King"
- Released: November 2, 1992
- Recorded: September 22, 1991
- Studio: Redwood Digital
- Genre: Folk rock; country rock
- Length: 5:03 (album version); 3:49 (single edit)
- Label: Reprise
- Songwriter: Neil Young
- Producer: Neil Young

Neil Young singles chronology
"War of Man" (1992)	"Harvest Moon" (1992)	"Unknown Legend" (1992)

Music video
- "Harvest Moon" on YouTube

"Harvest Moon" is a song written by Canadian and American singer and songwriter Neil Young, released in November 1992 by Reprise Records as the first single from his 19th album, Harvest Moon (1992). The song was both written and produced by Young, reaching No. 36 on the UK Singles Chart, and Rolling Stone ranked it his 30th best.

== Background and composition ==
Linda Ronstadt provides the backing vocals. The song is composed in the key of D Major, with Young's guitar in Drop D tuning and his vocal range spanning from D_{3} to F#_{4}.

== Reception ==
Rolling Stone ranked "Harvest Moon" in 2014 as the 30th-best Neil Young song of all time. AllMusic's Matthew Greenwald strongly praised the song, stating that the song epitomized the album and "the power of nature and music, as well as a feeling of celebrating lifetime love are the focal points here, and Young captures it all in his typically literate, artless style." Greenwald praised the melody as "positively gorgeous, and it's one that could have easily framed a heavier song." Classic Rock Review called it an "absolute masterpiece of a title song" that "celebrates longevity in relationships and love affairs with a flawless melody backed by a perfect music arrangement." They went on to say that "from the upfront acoustic riffing to the picked steel guitar, subtleties of ethereal sounds, soft brush strokes on the drums, and beautiful background vocals, this song captures the essence of beauty and romance as well any song ever."

Pitchfork said, "Young lets his guitar summon a vast distance—detuning the lowest string and letting it reverberate through the central riff, fingerpicking the harmonics high up the fretboard during the verses. The sound itself seems to conjure eternity, and the words do, too." Music critic Alexis Petridis wrote that "Harvest Moon" was a "genuinely beautiful hymn to marriage and enduring love". The British critic Sam Inglis wrote that if "Harvest Moon" had been released in 1973, Young would have been accused of artistic stagnation as the song sounded too similar to the songs on his album Harvest, but in 1992 the song was celebrated as the "end of a great musical journey", a refreshing return to Young's musical style of the early 1970s. Inglis wrote that much of the popular success of Harvest Moon in the fall of 1992 was due to a backlash against grunge music, which dominated the charts in first half of 1992. Grunge music tended to feature angry and/or depressing lyrics, and the romantic "gentleness" of Harvest Moon was felt to be an exhilarating contrast to grunge when it debuted in November 1992. Harvest Moon was widely seen as a sequel to Harvest, which added to its appeal.

The song was also featured in the soundtrack to the 2006 film My Blueberry Nights.

== Music video ==
The music video for the song was filmed during the night at the Mountain House, a restaurant situated inside a redwood forest at Skyline Boulevard, Woodside, California. The video featured Young and his wife attending a night-time dance at the Mountain House in 1992 where Young is somehow also the lead singer in the band playing at the Mountain House. The video then moves back in time to 1967 where a younger Young (played by Melvins drummer Dale Crover) and his girlfriend/future wife dance at the same location when it was known as Alex's, again with Young as the lead singer in the band playing, showing the enduring love between the couple over successive harvest moons over the years. Young's girlfriend drops a matchbox labelled Alex's in 1967 during her dance, which is still on the floor in 1992.

== Personnel ==
- Neil Young – guitar, harmonica, vocals
- Tim Drummond – bass, broom
- Kenny Buttrey – drums
- Ben Keith – pedal steel guitar
- Spooner Oldham – Hammond organ
- Linda Ronstadt – vocals

== Charts ==
=== Weekly charts ===
Chart (1992–93)	Peak position
Australia (ARIA)	117
Canada Top Singles (RPM)	5
UK Singles (OCC)	36
UK Airplay (Music Week)	43

=== Year-end charts ===
Chart (1993)	Position
Canada Top Singles (RPM)	42

== Certifications ==
Region	Certification	Certified units/sales
New Zealand (RMNZ)	2× Platinum	60,000^{‡}
United Kingdom (BPI)	Platinum	600,000^{‡}
^{‡} Sales+streaming figures based on certification alone.

== Books ==
- Inglis, Sam (2003). Neil Young's Harvest. London: Bloomsbury Academic. ISBN 9780826414953.
