= List of UK top-ten singles in 1959 =

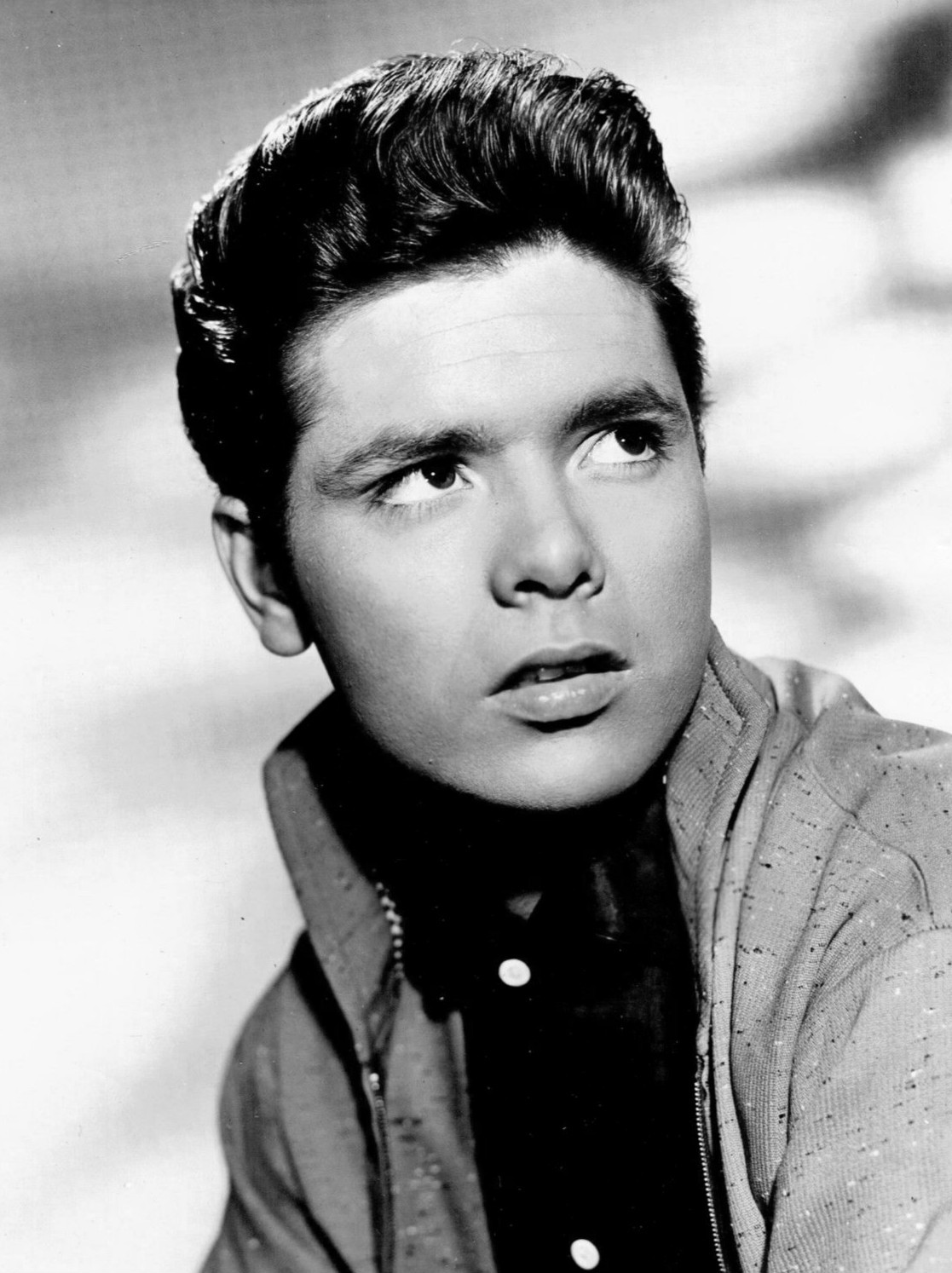
Cliff Richard had the best-selling single of 1959 with "Living Doll", which spent six weeks at number-one. He secured three other top 10 entries during the year, including a second number-one hit with "Travellin' Light", which topped the chart for five weeks.

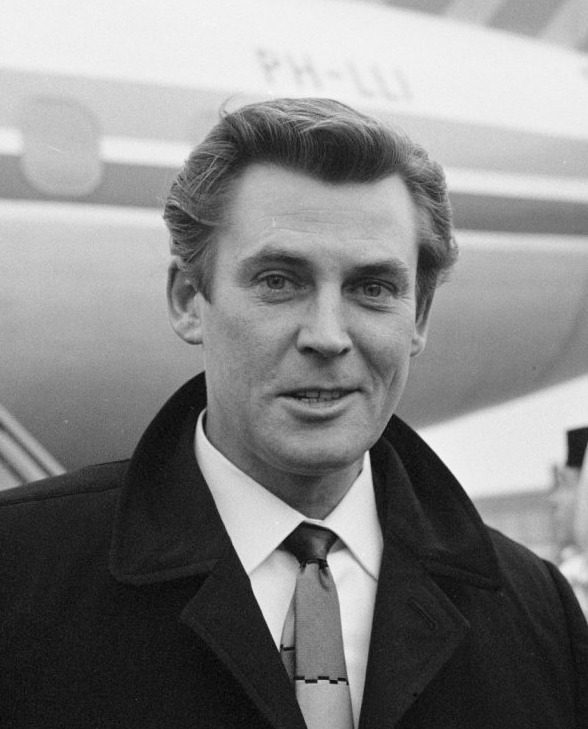
Russ Conway achieved six top 10 entries this year, the most of any artist, including the number-one singles "Side Saddle" and "Roulette".

The UK Singles Chart is one of many music charts compiled by the Official Charts Company that calculates the best-selling singles of the week in the United Kingdom. Before 2004, the chart was only based on the sales of physical singles. This list shows singles that peaked in the Top 10 of the UK Singles Chart during 1959, as well as singles which peaked in 1958 and 1960 but were in the top 10 in 1959. The entry date is when the single appeared in the top 10 for the first time (week ending, as published by the Official Charts Company, which is six days after the chart is announced).

Eighty singles were in the top ten in 1959. Eight singles from 1958 remained in the top 10 for several weeks at the beginning of the year, while "Little White Bull" by Tommy Steele, "Rawhide" by Frankie Laine, "Seven Little Girls Sitting in the Backseat" by The Avons and "Staccato's Theme" by Elmer Bernstein were all released in 1959 but did not reach their peak until 1960. "Love Makes the World Go 'Round" by Perry Como, "Tea for Two Cha Cha" by The Tommy Dorsey Orchestra starring Warren Covington, "The Day the Rains Came" by Jane Morgan and "Tom Dooley" by The Kingston Trio were the singles from 1958 to reach their peak in 1959. Nineteen artists scored multiple entries in the top 10 in 1959. Adam Faith, Anthony Newley, Johnny and the Hurricanes, Neil Sedaka and Russ Conway were among the many artists who achieved their first UK charting top 10 single in 1959.

The 1958 Christmas number-one, "It's Only Make Believe" by Conway Twitty, remained at number-one for the first three weeks of 1959. The first new number-one single of the year was "The Day the Rains Came" by Jane Morgan. Overall, sixteen different singles peaked at number-one in 1959, with Elvis Presley, Russ Conway, Bobby Darin and Cliff Richard (2) having the joint most singles hit that position.

== Background ==
=== Multiple entries ===
Eighty singles charted in the top 10 in 1959, with seventy singles reaching their peak this year. Three songs were recorded by several artists with each version reaching the top 10:

- "Come Softly to Me" – Frankie Vaughan & The Kaye Sisters, The Fleetwoods
- "Personality" – Anthony Newley, Lloyd Price
- "Tom Dooley" – The Kingston Trio (charted 1958, peaked this year), Lonnie Donegan (peaked 1958)

Nineteen artists scored multiple entries in the top 10 in 1959. Russ Conway secured the record for most top 10 hits in 1959 with six hit singles.

Shirley Bassey was one of a number of artists with two top-ten entries, including the number-one single "As I Love You". Anthony Newley, Frankie Vaughan, Neil Sedaka and Shirley Bassey were among the other artists who had multiple top 10 entries in 1959.

=== Chart debuts ===
Twenty-five artists achieved their first top 10 single in 1959, either as a lead or featured artist. Of these, four went on to record another hit single that year: Anthony Newley, Bobby Darin, Lloyd Price and Neil Sedaka. Russ Conway had five other entries in his breakthrough year.

The following table (collapsed on desktop site) does not include acts who had previously charted as part of a group and secured their first top 10 solo single.

Artist	Number of top 10s	First entry	Chart position	Other entries
Russ Conway	6	"More Party Pops"	10	"Side Saddle" (1), "Roulette" (1), "China Tea" (5), "Snow Coach" (7), "More and More Party Pops" (5)
The Teddy Bears	1	"To Know Him is to Love Him"	2	—
Slim Dusty	1	"A Pub with No Beer"	3	—
Chris Barber's Jazz Band	1	"Petite Fleur"	3	—
Lloyd Price	2	"Stagger Lee"	7	"Personality" (9)
Eddie Cochran	1	"C'mon Everybody"	6	—
The Coasters	1	"Charlie Brown"	6	—
The Fleetwoods	1	"Come Softly to Me"	6	—
Anthony Newley	2	"I've Waited So Long"	3	"Personality" (6)
Neil Sedaka	2	"I Go Ape"	9	"Oh! Carol" (3)
Bert Weedon	1	"Guitar Boogie Shuffle"	10	—
Bobby Darin	2	"Dream Lover"	1	"Mack the Knife" (1)
Duane Eddy	1	"Peter Gunn"	6	—
Craig Douglas	1	"Only Sixteen"	1	—
Jerry Keller	1	"Here Comes Summer"	1	—
The Browns	1	"The Three Bells (Les trois cloches)"	6	—
Sarah Vaughan	1	"Broken Hearted Melody"	7	—
Johnny and the Hurricanes	1	"Red River Rock"	3	—
Emile Ford & The Checkmates	1	"What Do You Want to Make Those Eyes at Me For?"	1	—
Floyd Robinson	1	"Makin' Love"	9	—
Adam Faith	1	"What Do You Want?"	1	—
The Avons	1	"Seven Little Girls Sitting in the Backseat" ^{[A]}	3	—
Sandy Nelson	1	"Teen Beat"	9	—
Elmer Bernstein	1	"Staccato's Theme" ^{[B]}	4	—

Notes

Cliff Richard's backing group previously charted under the name The Drifters, including three entries in 1959, but they changed their name to The Shadows towards the end of this year. "Travellin' Light" was the first song to reach the top 10 under their new identity, topping the chart for five weeks from 30 October.

=== Songs from films ===
Original songs from various films entered the top 10 throughout the year. These included "Living Doll" (from Serious Charge), "Lonely Boy" (Girls Town), "The Heart of a Man" (The Heart of a Man) and "High Hopes" (A Hole in the Head).

=== Best-selling singles ===
Until 1970 there was no universally recognised year-end best-sellers list. However, in 2011 the Official Charts Company released a list of the best-selling single of each year in chart history from 1952 to date. According to the list, "Living Doll" by Cliff Richard and The Drifters is officially recorded as the biggest-selling single of 1959. "What Do You Want to Make Those Eyes at Me For?" (4), "What Do You Want?" (6), "Living Doll" (7) and "It Doesn't Matter Anymore" (10) all ranked in the top 10 best-selling singles of the decade.

== Top-ten singles ==
Key

Symbol	Meaning
‡	Single peaked in 1958 but still in chart in 1959.
♦	Single released in 1959 but peaked in 1960.
(#)	Year-end best-selling single.
Entered	The date that the single first appeared in the chart.
Peak	Highest position that the single reached in the UK Singles Chart.

Entered (week ending)	Weeks in top 10	Single	Artist	Peak	Peak reached (week ending)	Weeks at peak
Singles in 1958
24 October 1958	11	"It's All in the Game" ‡	Tommy Edwards	1	7 November 1958	3
31 October 1958	13	"Hoots Mon" ‡	Lord Rockingham's XI	1	28 November 1958	3
21 November 1958	12	"It's Only Make Believe" ‡	Conway Twitty	1	19 December 1958	5
21 November 1958	9	"Tea for Two Cha Cha"	The Tommy Dorsey Orchestra starring Warren Covington	3	2 January 1959	1
28 November 1958	9	"Tom Dooley" ‡ ^{[C]}	Lonnie Donegan	3	5 December 1958	5
28 November 1958	8	"Love Makes the World Go 'Round"	Perry Como	6	9 January 1959	1
5 December 1958	7	"Tom Dooley" ^{[D]}	The Kingston Trio	5	2 January 1959	1
5 December 1958	7	"High Class Baby" ‡	Cliff Richard & The Drifters ^{[E]}	7	12 December 1958	1
26 December 1958	9	"The Day the Rains Came"	Jane Morgan	1	23 January 1959	1
26 December 1958	2	"Come On, Let's Go" ‡ ^{[F]}	Tommy Steele	10	26 December 1958	2
Singles in 1959
2 January 1959	1	"More Party Pops"	Russ Conway	10	2 January 1959	1
9 January 1959	7	"Baby Face"	Little Richard	2	23 January 1959	1
9 January 1959	8	"To Know Him Is to Love Him"	The Teddy Bears	2	30 January 1959	2
16 January 1959	9	"Kiss Me, Honey Honey, Kiss Me"	Shirley Bassey	3	6 February 1959	2
23 January 1959	7	"One Night"/"I Got Stung"	Elvis Presley	1	30 January 1959	3
23 January 1959	12	"As I Love You"	Shirley Bassey	1	20 February 1959	4
30 January 1959	5	"Problems"	The Everly Brothers	6	6 February 1959	1
30 January 1959	14	"Smoke Gets in Your Eyes"	The Platters	1	20 March 1959	1
6 February 1959	6	"Does Your Chewing Gum Lose Its Flavour (On the Bedpost Overnight?)"	Lonnie Donegan	3	27 February 1959	1
13 February 1959	2	"(All Of a Sudden) My Heart Sings" ^{[G]}	Paul Anka	10	13 February 1959	2
20 February 1959	8	"A Pub with No Beer"	Slim Dusty	3	6 March 1959	2
27 February 1959	15	"Petite Fleur"	Chris Barber's Jazz Band	3	17 April 1959	3
27 February 1959	5	"The Little Drummer Boy"	The Beverley Sisters	6	13 March 1959	1
6 March 1959	18	"Side Saddle"	Russ Conway	1	27 March 1959	4
6 March 1959	8	"My Happiness"	Connie Francis	4	27 March 1959	2
20 March 1959	6	"Stagger Lee"	Lloyd Price	7	20 March 1959	5
20 March 1959	5	"Gigi"	Billy Eckstine	8	20 March 1959	3
20 March 1959	15	"It Doesn't Matter Anymore"	Buddy Holly	1	24 April 1959	3
3 April 1959	1	"Tomboy"	Perry Como	10	3 April 1959	1
10 April 1959	9	"Donna"	Marty Wilde	3	15 May 1959	1
17 April 1959	3	"C'mon Everybody"	Eddie Cochran	6	17 April 1959	1
17 April 1959	5	"Charlie Brown"	The Coasters	6	24 April 1959	2
24 April 1959	13	"A Fool Such as I"/"I Need Your Love Tonight"	Elvis Presley	1	15 May 1959	5
1 May 1959	11	"It's Late" ^{[H]}	Ricky Nelson	3	22 May 1959	2
1 May 1959	6	"Come Softly to Me" ^{[I]}	The Fleetwoods	6	15 May 1959	1
8 May 1959	11	"I've Waited So Long"	Anthony Newley	3	5 June 1959	1
8 May 1959	5	"Come Softly to Me"	Frankie Vaughan & The Kaye Sisters	9	22 May 1959	2
22 May 1959	1	"Mean Streak"	Cliff Richard & The Drifters ^{[E]}	10	22 May 1959	1
29 May 1959	14	"Roulette"	Russ Conway	1	19 June 1959	2
29 May 1959	2	"I Go Ape" ^{[J]}	Neil Sedaka	9	12 June 1959	1
5 June 1959	2	"Guitar Boogie Shuffle" ^{[K]}	Bert Weedon	10	5 June 1959	2
12 June 1959	13	"Dream Lover"	Bobby Darin	1	3 July 1959	4
12 June 1959	11	"A Teenager in Love"	Marty Wilde	2	10 July 1959	2
19 June 1959	1	"May You Always"	Joan Regan	9	19 June 1959	1
26 June 1959	13	"The Battle of New Orleans"	Lonnie Donegan	2	24 July 1959	2
26 June 1959	6	"Peter Gunn"	Duane Eddy	6	10 July 1959	2
3 July 1959	7	"Personality"	Anthony Newley	6	3 July 1959	1
3 July 1959	3	"Personality" ^{[L]}	Lloyd Price	9	10 July 1959	1
10 July 1959	1	"Goodbye Jimmy, Goodbye"	Ruby Murray	10	10 July 1959	1
17 July 1959	15	"Living Doll" (#1)	Cliff Richard & The Drifters ^{[E]}	1	31 July 1959	6
17 July 1959	11	"Lipstick on Your Collar"	Connie Francis	3	21 August 1959	1
24 July 1959	6	"A Big Hunk o' Love"	Elvis Presley	4	7 August 1959	1
7 August 1959	10	"Lonely Boy"	Paul Anka	3	28 August 1959	3
14 August 1959	7	"The Heart of a Man"	Frankie Vaughan	5	4 September 1959	1
21 August 1959	11	"Only Sixteen"	Craig Douglas	1	11 September 1959	4
28 August 1959	7	"China Tea"	Russ Conway	5	11 September 1959	2
28 August 1959	7	"Someone"	Johnny Mathis	6	11 September 1959	3
4 September 1959	9	"Here Comes Summer"	Jerry Keller	1	9 October 1959	1
11 September 1959	5	"Mona Lisa" ^{[M]}	Conway Twitty	5	25 September 1959	1
25 September 1959	11	"(Till) I Kissed You"	The Everly Brothers	2	23 October 1959	1
2 October 1959	11	"Mack the Knife"	Bobby Darin	1	16 October 1959	2
2 October 1959	7	"The Three Bells" ^{[N]}	The Browns	6	16 October 1959	2
9 October 1959	7	"High Hopes"	Frank Sinatra	6	6 November 1959	1
16 October 1959	7	"Sea of Love"	Marty Wilde	3	30 October 1959	2
16 October 1959	13	"Travellin' Light"	Cliff Richard & The Shadows ^{[E]}	1	30 October 1959	5
16 October 1959	6	"Broken Hearted Melody" ^{[O]}	Sarah Vaughan	7	30 October 1959	2
30 October 1959	10	"Red River Rock"	Johnny and the Hurricanes	3	13 November 1959	1
6 November 1959	15	"What Do You Want to Make Those Eyes at Me For?"	Emile Ford & The Checkmates	1	18 December 1959	6
6 November 1959	7	"Put Your Head on My Shoulder"	Paul Anka	7	20 November 1959	5
13 November 1959	1	"Makin' Love"	Floyd Robinson	9	13 November 1959	1
20 November 1959	12	"Oh! Carol"	Neil Sedaka	3	18 December 1959	4
27 November 1959	11	"What Do You Want?"	Adam Faith	1	4 December 1959	3
4 December 1959	8	"Seven Little Girls Sitting in the Backseat" ♦	The Avons	3	1 January 1960	1
4 December 1959	2	"Teen Beat"	Sandy Nelson	9	11 December 1959	1
11 December 1959	4	"Snow Coach"	Russ Conway	7	25 December 1959	1
18 December 1959	4	"Rawhide" ♦ ^{[P]}	Frankie Laine	6	1 January 1960	1
18 December 1959	2	"More and More Party Pops"	Russ Conway	5	25 December 1959	1
18 December 1959	1	"Piano Party"	Winifred Atwell	10	18 December 1959	1
25 December 1959	7	"Staccato's Theme" ♦	Elmer Bernstein	4	15 January 1960	1
25 December 1959	6	"Little White Bull" ♦ ^{[Q]}	Tommy Steele	6	8 January 1960	1

== Entries by artist ==
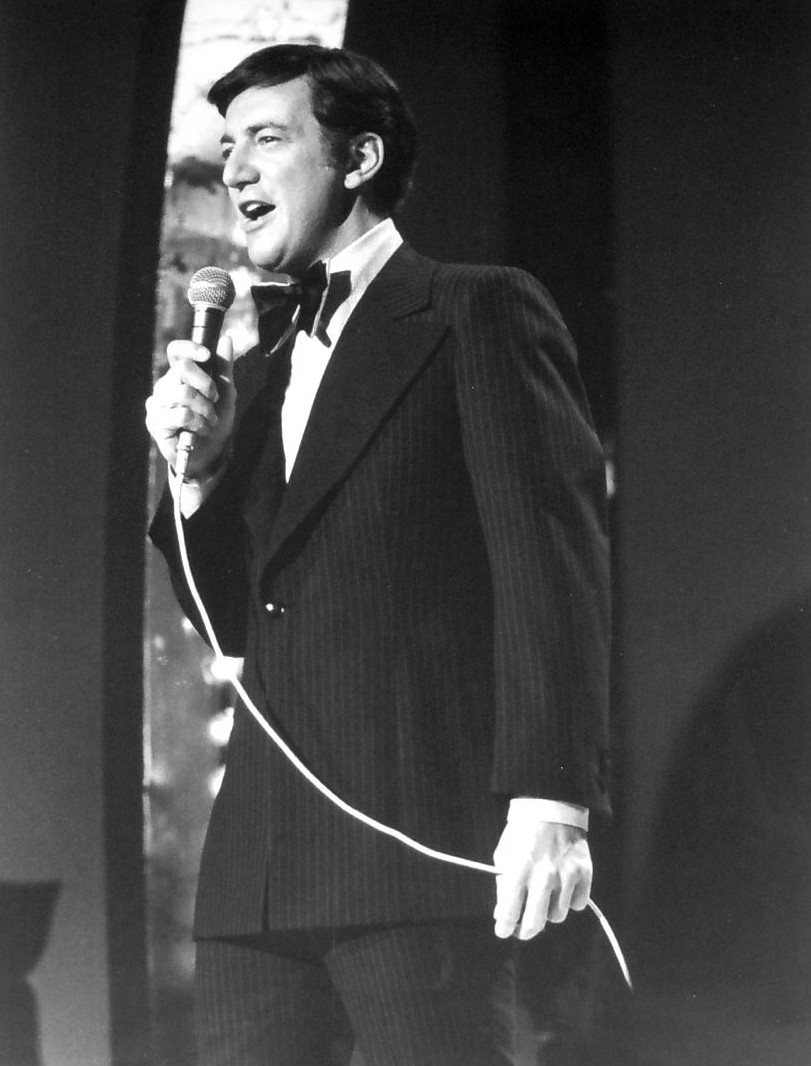
Bobby Darin (pictured in 1972) earned two number-one hits with his two top 10 entries of 1959: "Dream Lover" and "Mack the Knife".

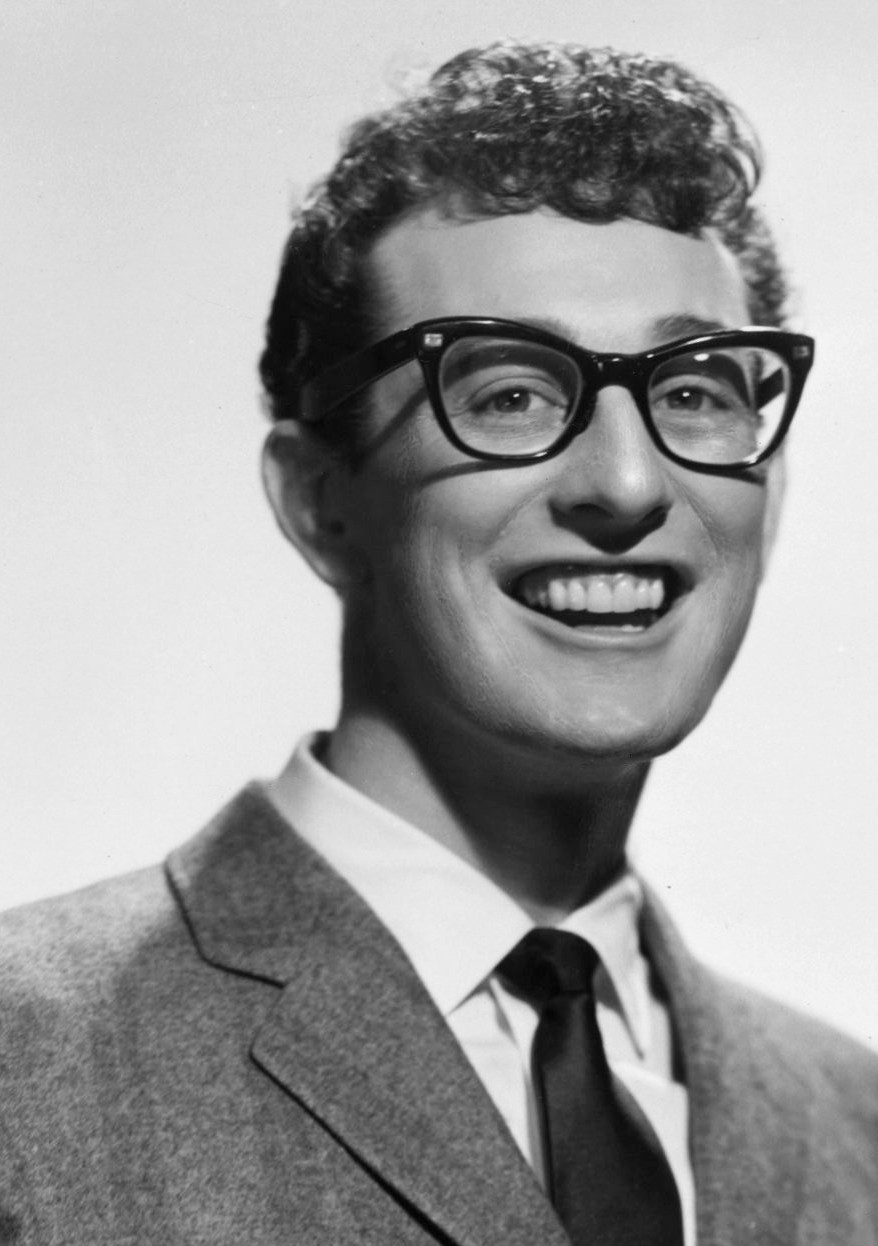
Following his death in a plane crash on 3 February this year, Buddy Holly became the first artist to secure a posthumous number-one hit in the UK Singles Chart with "It Doesn't Matter Anymore".

The following table shows artists who achieved two or more top 10 entries in 1959, including singles that reached their peak in 1958 or 1960. The figures include both main artists and featured artists. The total number of weeks an artist spent in the top ten in 1959 is also shown.

Entries	Artist	Weeks	Singles
6	Russ Conway	44	"China Tea", "More and More Party Pops", "More Party Pops", "Roulette", "Side Saddle", "Snow Coach"
4	Cliff Richard ^{[R]}	29	"High Class Baby", "Living Doll", "Mean Streak", "Travellin' Light"
4	The Shadows/The Drifters ^{[E]}^{[R]}	29	"High Class Baby", "Living Doll", "Mean Streak", "Travellin' Light"
3	Elvis Presley	26	"A Big Hunk o' Love", "A Fool Such as I"/"I Need Your Love Tonight", "One Night"/"I Got Stung"
3	Lonnie Donegan ^{[R]}	24	"The Battle of New Orleans", "Does Your Chewing Gum Lose Its Flavour (On the Bedpost Overnight?)", "Tom Dooley"
3	Marty Wilde	27	"A Teenager in Love", "Donna", "Sea of Love"
3	Paul Anka	19	"(All Of a Sudden) My Heart Sings", "Lonely Boy", "Put Your Head on My Shoulder"
2	Anthony Newley	18	"I've Waited So Long", "Personality"
2	Bobby Darin	24	"Dream Lover", "Mack the Knife"
2	Connie Francis	19	"Lipstick on Your Collar", "My Happiness"
2	Conway Twitty ^{[R]}	10	"It's Only Make Believe", "Mona Lisa"
2	The Everly Brothers	16	"Problems", "(Till) I Kissed You"
2	Frankie Vaughan	12	"Come Softly to Me", "The Heart of a Man"
2	Lloyd Price	9	"Personality", "Stagger Lee"
2	Neil Sedaka	6	"I Go Ape", "Oh! Carol"
2	Perry Como ^{[S]}	5	"Love Makes the World Go Round", "Tomboy"
2	Shirley Bassey	21	"As I Love You", "Kiss Me, Honey Honey, Kiss Me"
2	Tommy Steele ^{[T]}	3	"Come On, Let's Go", "Little White Bull"

== Notes ==
- ^{a} "Seven Little Girls Sitting in the Backseat" reached its peak of number three on 7 January 1960 (week ending).
- ^{b} "Staccato's Theme" reached its peak of number four on 21 January 1960 (week ending).
- ^{c} "Tom Dooley" (Lonnie Donegan version) re-entered the top 10 at number 10 on 5 February 1959 (week ending).
- ^{d} "Tom Dooley" (The Kingston Trio version) re-entered the top 10 at number 10 on 29 February 1959 (week ending).
- ^{e} The Drifters changed their name to The Shadows in 1959, to avoid confusion with the American group of the same name, who also threatened legal action over the band's name after "Feelin' Fine" was released in the United States. "Travellin' Light" was the group's first top 10 entry under their new name.
- ^{f} "Come On, Let's Go" re-entered the top 10 at number 10 on 22 January 1959 (week ending).
- ^{g} "(All of a Sudden) My Heart Sings" re-entered the top 10 at number 10 on 19 March 1959 (week ending).
- ^{h} "It's Late" re-entered the top 10 at number 10 on 6 August 1959 (week ending) for 2 weeks.
- ^{i} "Come Softly to Me" (Frankie Vaughan & The Kaye Sisters version) re-entered the top 10 at number 10 on 18 June 1959 (week ending).
- ^{j} "I Go Ape" re-entered the top 10 at number 9 on 18 June 1959 (week ending).
- ^{k} "Guitar Boogie Shuffle" re-entered the top 10 at number 10 on 25 June 1959 (week ending).
- ^{l} "Personality" (Lloyd Price version) re-entered the top 10 at number 10 on 30 July 1959 (week ending).
- ^{m} "Mona Lisa" re-entered the top 10 at number 10 on 29 October 1959 (week ending).
- ^{n} "The Three Bells" re-entered the top 10 at number 9 on 26 November 1959 (week ending).
- ^{o} "Broken Hearted Melody" re-entered the top 10 at number 10 on 3 December 1959 (week ending).
- ^{p} "Rawhide" re-entered the top 10 at number 6 on 7 January 1960 (week ending) for 3 weeks.
- ^{q} "Little White Bull" re-entered the top 10 at number 10 on 11 February 1960 (week ending).
- ^{r} Figure includes single that peaked in 1958.
- ^{s} Figure includes single that first charted in 1958 but peaked in 1959.
- ^{t} Figure includes single that peaked in 1960.

== See also ==
- 1959 in British music
- List of number-one singles from the 1950s (UK)
