= Livin' Lovin' Doll =

1959 single by Cliff Richard and the Drifters

Single by Cliff Richard and the Drifters
- B-side: "Steady with You"
- Released: 23 January 1959
- Recorded: 14 November 1958
- Studio: EMI Studios, London
- Genre: Rock and roll
- Length: 2:08
- Label: Columbia
- Songwriters: Norrie Paramor; Bunny Lewis
- Producer: Norrie Paramor

Cliff Richard and the Drifters singles chronology
"High Class Baby" (1958)	"Livin' Lovin' Doll" (1959)	"Mean Streak" (1959)

"Livin' Lovin' Doll" is a song by Cliff Richard and the Drifters (who would later become the Shadows), released in January 1959 as their third single. Unlike their previous two top-ten singles, it only peaked at number 20 on the New Musical Express chart.

== Background and recording ==
Richard hated singing the Serious Charge film version of "Living Doll" as it was much faster than the eventual single. In order to try to prevent it from being released as a single, producer Norrie Paramor decided to write a song with a similar title. So, together with his friend Bunny Lewis, they wrote "Livin' Lovin' Doll" using the pseudonyms Johnny May and Jim Gustard so that no one would realise who was behind it.

Like with the previous two singles, Paramor hired session musicians Ernie Shear to play lead guitar and Frank Clarke to play upright bass if needed. Recently joined members of the Drifters, Hank Marvin, Bruce Welch and Jet Harris, would then play rhythm and bass guitars. However, Richard was not happy with Shear playing lead instead of Marvin. According to Marvin, Richard felt that Shear "wasn't really into rock 'n' roll" and "tended to do the same thing every time". Marvin did a take on lead guitar, describing his version as "a bit more original", and Richard was much happier with it. Paramor agreed and that was the last time he booked in session musicians for the group.

The flip slide "Steady with You" was written by former Drifters member Ian Samwell and was recorded on 19 November. It has been described as Richard's first ballad and was a lot slower than his usual rock and roll songs. Along with the usual personnel of Marvin, Welch, Harris and Terry Smart, the track includes piano by Paramor and backing vocals by the Mike Sammes Singers.

== Reception ==
"Livin' Lovin' Doll" failed to achieve the same success as the group's previous two singles, "Move It" and "High Class Baby". In order to satisfy public demand for the release of "Living Doll", Richard re-recorded it as a slowed-down version and released it in July as the group's fifth single.

Reviewing for Disc, Don Nicholl gave it 3 out of 5 stars, describing it as "a number which must have been tailored for him. Cliff chants it with a swift beat, while the Drifters supply their usual backing". Nicholl also wrote that "Steady with You" is "a beat ballad [slowed down] in treacly romantic fashion" and that Richard "handles it with considerable aplomb".

== Track listing ==
1. "Livin' Lovin' Doll" – 2:08
2. "Steady with You" – 2:21

== Personnel ==
- Cliff Richard – vocals
- Hank Marvin – lead guitar
- Bruce Welch – rhythm guitar
- Jet Harris – bass guitar
- Terry Smart – drums

== Charts ==
Chart (1959)	Peak position
UK Disc Top 20	17
UK New Musical Express Top 30	20
