= Serious Charge (EP) =

EP by Cliff Richard and the Drifters
- Released: May 1959
- Recorded: 28 April 1959
- Studios: EMI Studios, London
- Genre: Rock and roll
- Length: 8:44
- Label: Columbia
- Producer: Norrie Paramor

Cliff Richard chronology
Serious Charge (1959)	Cliff No. 1 (1959)

Serious Charge is the first EP by Cliff Richard and the Drifters, released in the UK in May 1959 as the soundtrack for the film of the same name.

== Background and recording ==
Following the success of "Move It" and his television appearances on Oh Boy!, Richard was cast in his first film Serious Charge, with the film's producer and co-writer Mickey Delamar wanting to cast a British Elvis. The film was directed by Terence Young, who later said that Richard "seemed terribly self-assured and had a very good stage act. I thought if he could do that, then he could act". Filming started in late October 1958, with Richard having a minor role playing an amateur rock and roll singer. Richard was only initially going to sing one song in the film, but apparently the film company were so impressed with his performance that two further songs were added after filming had begun.

The three songs sung by Richard ("Living Doll", "No Turning Back" and Mad About You") were written by Lionel Bart. The versions of the songs on the EP are different to the film versions due to a rule by the Musicians' Union where film and commercial versions had to be different. Notably, "Living Doll" was re-recorded as a slow ballad compared to the faster rock and roll version in the film. Richard and the Drifters performed the song in the style that Bart had written it; however, they did not like the song, deeming it "pseudo-rock". The contract with the film company stated that a single would have to be released from the film so when rhythm guitarist Bruce Welch suggested singing the song in a country and western style they did so, and its popularity led Richard and the Drifters to switch from rock and roll to the ballads. The versions of "No Turning Back" are also quite different, with a rock version in the film and a swing jazz arrangement on the EP.

The Drifters also recorded their first instrumental, "Chinchilla", for the film, which features as the final track on the EP. The instrumental is a cover, originally performed by American band the X-Rays.

Whilst the original recording dates are not known for the film versions of the tracks, all four tracks on the EP were recorded on 28 April 1959 at EMI Studios.

The EP was released in mono by Columbia in May 1959, around the same time as the release of the film. The EP did not initially chart upon release, though it is worth noting that it was released prior to the UK's first EP chart in November 1959. On the back on the success of Richard's subsequent soundtrack EP Expresso Bongo, Serious Charge did enter the Melody Maker Top Ten EP chart in January 1960, peaking at number 9. "Living Doll" was also released as a single in July 1959, becoming a number one hit and selling over a million copies worldwide.

== Track listing ==
Side A
No.	Title	Writer(s)	Length
1.	"Living Doll"	Lionel Bart	2:35
2.	"No Turning Back"	Bart	2:30

Side B
No.	Title	Writer(s)	Length
3.	"Mad About You"	Bart	1:45
4.	"Chinchilla" (by the Drifters)	Randy Starr; Dick Wolfe	1:54
Total length:			8:44

== Personnel ==
- Cliff Richard – vocals (1, 2, 3)
- Hank Marvin – lead guitar
- Bruce Welch – rhythm guitar
- Jet Harris – bass guitar
- Tony Meehan – drums
- Norrie Paramor – piano (4)
