= List of number-one hits of 1962 (Argentina) =

This is a list of the songs that reached number one in Argentina in 1962, according to Billboard magazine with data provided by Rubén Machado's "Escalera a la fama".

Issue date	Song	Artist(s)
January 6	"Escándalo"	Roberto Yanés/Antonio Prieto/Olga Guillot/ Javier Solís/Raúl Verdier
January 13	"Escándalo"	Roberto Yanés/Antonio Prieto/Olga Guillot/ Javier Solís/Raúl Verdier
January 27	"Presumida"	Los Teen Tops/Johnny Tedesco
February 3	"Del tiempo i' mama"	Los Chalchaleros/Los Cantores de Quilla Huasi/ Los Cantores de Salavina/Tomás Campos
February 10	"Let's Twist Again"	Chubby Checker/Richard Anthony
February 17	"Let's Twist Again"	Chubby Checker/Richard Anthony
February 24	"Let's Twist Again"	Chubby Checker/Richard Anthony
March 3	"Let's Twist Again"	Chubby Checker/Richard Anthony
March 10	"Let's Twist Again"	Chubby Checker/Richard Anthony
March 17	"Let's Twist Again"	Chubby Checker/Richard Anthony
March 24	"Let's Twist Again"	Chubby Checker/Richard Anthony
March 31	"Let's Twist Again"	Chubby Checker/Richard Anthony
April 7	"Let's Twist Again"	Chubby Checker/Richard Anthony
April 14	"Let's Twist Again"	Chubby Checker/Richard Anthony
April 21	"Let's Twist Again"	Chubby Checker/Richard Anthony
April 28	"Let's Twist Again"	Chubby Checker/Richard Anthony
May 5	"La ballata della tromba"	Gastone Parigi/Los Cinco Latinos
May 12	"La ballata della tromba"	Gastone Parigi/Los Cinco Latinos
May 19	"La ballata della tromba"	Gastone Parigi/Los Cinco Latinos
May 26	"La ballata della tromba"	Gastone Parigi/Los Cinco Latinos
June 2	"La ballata della tromba"	Gastone Parigi/Los Cinco Latinos
June 9	"Popotitos"	Los Teen Tops
June 16	"Medianoche en Moscú"	Stirling Brandy/Los Mac Ke Mac's
June 23	"Medianoche en Moscú"	Stirling Brandy/Los Mac Ke Mac's
June 30	"Medianoche en Moscú"	Stirling Brandy/Los Mac Ke Mac's
July 7	"Medianoche en Moscú"	Stirling Brandy/Los Mac Ke Mac's
July 14	"Medianoche en Moscú"	Stirling Brandy/Los Mac Ke Mac's
July 21	"Medianoche en Moscú"	Stirling Brandy/Los Mac Ke Mac's
July 28	"Medianoche en Moscú"	Stirling Brandy/Los Mac Ke Mac's
August 4	"Medianoche en Moscú"	Stirling Brandy/Los Mac Ke Mac's
August 11	"Medianoche en Moscú"	Stirling Brandy/Los Mac Ke Mac's
August 18	"Medianoche en Moscú"	Stirling Brandy/Los Mac Ke Mac's
August 25	"Medianoche en Moscú"	Stirling Brandy/Los Mac Ke Mac's
September 1	"Paloma"	Roberto Yanés/Los Cantores de Quilla Huasi/ Los Andariegos
September 8	"Paloma"	Roberto Yanés/Los Cantores de Quilla Huasi/ Los Andariegos
September 15	"Paloma"	Roberto Yanés/Los Cantores de Quilla Huasi/ Los Andariegos
September 22	"Paloma"	Roberto Yanés/Los Cantores de Quilla Huasi/ Los Andariegos
September 29	"Ritmo africano"	Bert Kaempfert
October 6	"Ritmo africano"	Bert Kaempfert
October 13	"Ritmo africano"	Bert Kaempfert
October 20	"Cuando calienta el sol"	Tony Vilar/Los Marcellos Ferial/ Siro San Román
October 27	"Cuando calienta el sol"	Tony Vilar/Los Marcellos Ferial/ Siro San Román
November 3	"Cuando calienta el sol"	Tony Vilar/Los Marcellos Ferial/ Siro San Román
November 10	"Cuando calienta el sol"	Tony Vilar/Los Marcellos Ferial/ Siro San Román
November 17	"Speedy Gonzales"	Pat Boone/David Dante
November 24	"Speedy Gonzales"	Pat Boone/David Dante
December 1	"Speedy Gonzales"	Pat Boone/David Dante
December 8	"Speedy Gonzales"	Pat Boone/David Dante
December 15	"Speedy Gonzales"	Pat Boone/David Dante/ Peppino di Capri
December 22	"Speedy Gonzales"	Pat Boone/David Dante/ Peppino di Capri
December 29	"Speedy Gonzales"	Pat Boone/David Dante/ Peppino di Capri

== See also ==
- 1962 in music
