= China Tea (instrumental) =

1959 single by Russ Conway

Single by Russ Conway with Accompaniment directed by Geoff Love
- B-side: "The Wee Boy of Brussels"
- Released: August 1959
- Recorded: 7 July 1959
- Studio: Abbey Road Studios
- Genre: Popular music, piano music
- Length: 2:04
- Label: Columbia Records
- Songwriter: Trevor H. Stanford

"China Tea" is a piano solo instrumental which was written and recorded by the English pianist Russ Conway. It became a hit for Conway in 1959, with his recording reaching the UK Singles Chart top 10. He composed the tune and published it under his real name, Trevor H. (Herbert) Stanford. "China Tea" spent two weeks at No. 1 on the UK's sheet music charts in October 1959.

== Background and reception ==
Russ Conway recorded "China Tea" for EMI's Columbia Records on 7 July 1959, with accompaniment directed by Geoff Love. It was released as a single the following month. The Gramophone magazine review described it as "another obvious hit".

In his book, When I Was a Nipper, Alan Titchmarsh recalls "China Tea" being the first record he bought with his own money.

== Chart performance ==
Two of Conway's singles released in 1959, "Side Saddle" and "Roulette", had reached No. 1 on the New Musical Express singles chart (his other singles from that year were part of his "Piano Pops" series of contemporary hit medleys, rather than being one tune). "China Tea" was his third consecutive top 10 hit, and, like the previous two, his own composition. It entered the chart on 21 August 1959 at No. 23, and peaked at No. 5 in its fourth week, on 11 September. It spent another week at No. 5, and 13 weeks on chart in total, including seven in the top 10. Conway's single was not deleted from the EMI catalogues until April 1961.

On 15 August 1959, Conway's composition entered the UK's sheet music chart. It reached No. 1 on 10 October 1959, its eighth week on chart, where it spent a week, before being replaced for a week by "Only Sixteen". The following week, on 24 October, "China Tea" returned to the top spot for a second and final week at No. 1. The song spent a total of 25 weeks on the sheet music charts.

== Recordings ==
Conway's version of "China Tea" was the first of three to be issued as singles, in August 1959. The following month, Joe Julian's piano version on the Woolworths budget label Embassy was issued, and October saw a quickstep version by Conway's Columbia labelmate Victor Silvester and his Ballroom Orchestra. All three versions were issued on both 45 rpm vinyl and 78 rpm shellac formats. Conway's recording was the only version to make the UK or US singles charts; it was released in America on Cub Records.

A re-recording by Conway of "China Tea" was included on his album The Great Piano Hits, released by Pye's Golden Hour label in June 1973.

Laurie Holloway included "China Tea" in his 1977 LP 25 Golden Piano Greats and Phil Kelsall recorded a version on the Wurlitzer Organ at the Tower Ballroom, Blackpool in 1998.
