= Marie Devereux =

British model and film actress (1940–2019)

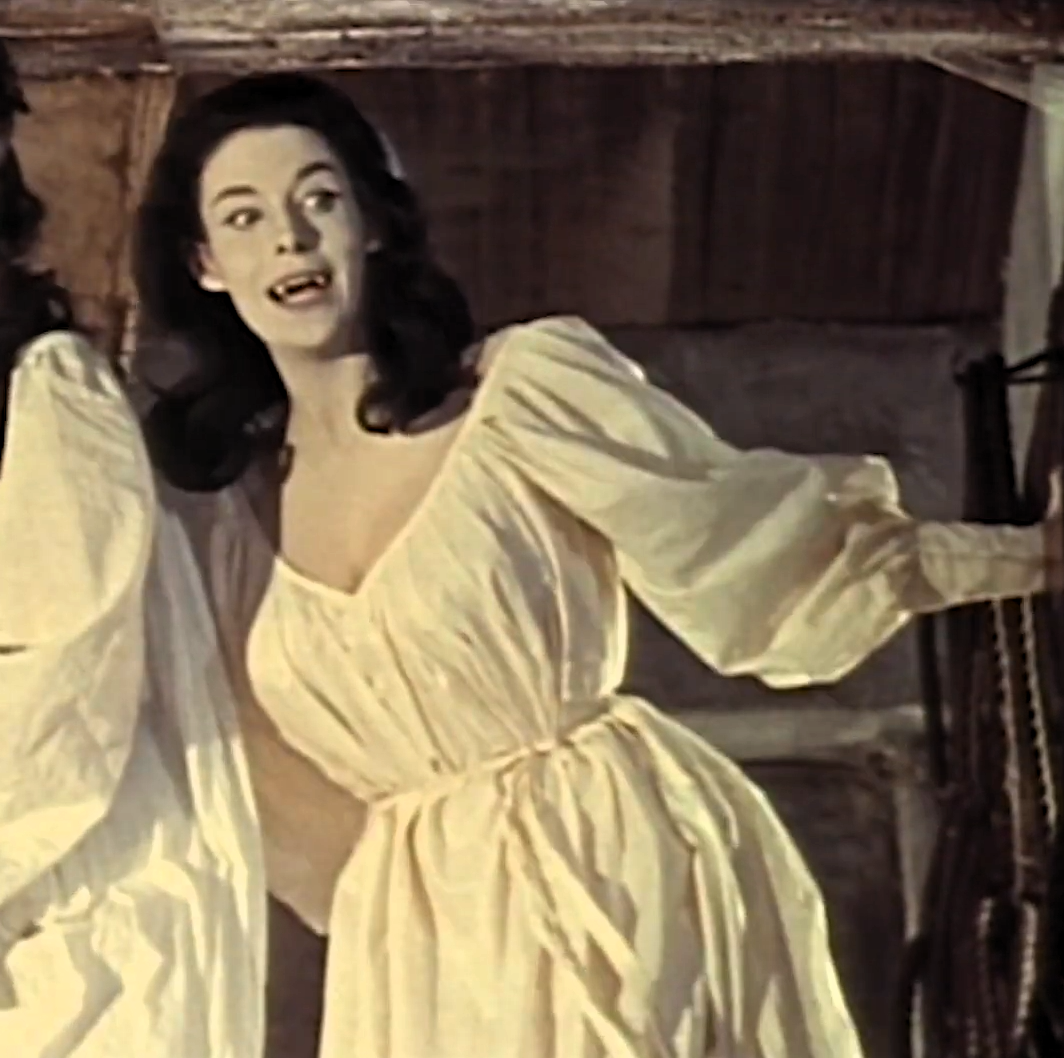
- Devereux as a vampire woman in The Brides of Dracula (1960)
- Born: 27 November 1940; Edmonton, London
- Died: 30 December 2019 (aged 79); Meridian, Idaho

Marie Devereux (27 November 1940 – 30 December 2019) was a British model and film actress. She was born Patricia Sutcliffe on 27 November 1940 in Edmonton, London.

== Career ==
Devereux became a regular and popular nude model in magazines during the 1950s; she was photographed by George Harrison Marks.

She had a brief career in cinema that began in the late 1950s, often as a sexy girl in comedies, dramas and horror films, but under the direction of some distinguished filmmakers. After appearing in Terence Young's Serious Charge and Stanley Donen's Surprise Package, Devereux acted in three Hammer Film Productions: The Stranglers of Bombay (1959), The Brides of Dracula (1960) and John Gilling's The Pirates of Blood River (1962).

She appeared in Guy Green's acclaimed drama The Mark (1961) and travelled to Italy to work as Elizabeth Taylor's stand-in during the filming of Cleopatra (1963). Devereux went to Hollywood after the production closed in Rome and appeared in Samuel Fuller's cult melodramas Shock Corridor (1963) and The Naked Kiss (1964).

Following The Naked Kiss, she retired from acting, married and raised a family.

Devereux died in Meridian, Idaho, United States on 30 December 2019.

== Selected filmography ==
- The Woman Eater (1958)
- Grip of the Strangler (1958)
- I Only Arsked! (1958)
- Serious Charge (1959)
- The Stranglers of Bombay (1959)
- The Treasure of San Teresa (1959)
- Surprise Package (1960)
- The Brides of Dracula (1960)
- His and Hers (1961)
- Dentist on the Job (1961)
- The Singer Not the Song (1961)
- Rag Doll (1961)
- The Mark (1961)
- Only Two Can Play (1962)
- The Pirates of Blood River (1962)
- Cleopatra (1963)
- Shock Corridor (1963)
- The Naked Kiss (1964)
