= The Stranglers of Bombay =

1960 British film by Terence Fisher

- Directed by: Terence Fisher
- Written by: David Z. Goodman
- Produced by: Anthony Hinds; Michael Carreras; Anthony Nelson-Keys
- Starring: Guy Rolfe; Allan Cuthbertson; Andrew Cruickshank; George Pastell; Marne Maitland
- Cinematography: Arthur Grant; Len Harris
- Edited by: Alfred Cox
- Music by: James Bernard; John Hollingsworth
- Production companies: Hammer Film Productions; Kenneth Hyman Prods.
- Distributed by: Columbia Pictures
- Release dates: 18 January 1960 (UK); May 1960 (US)
- Running time: 81 minutes
- Country: United Kingdom
- Language: English
- Box office: 295,011 admissions (France)

The Stranglers of Bombay is a 1960 British adventure horror film directed by Terence Fisher and starring Guy Rolfe, Allan Cuthbertson and Andrew Cruickshank. It was written by David Z. Goodman and produced by Hammer Films. The film deals with the British East India Company's true-life investigation of the cult of the Thuggee stranglers in the 1830s.

== Plot ==
Captain Harry Lewis of the British East India Company is investigating why over 2,000 natives are missing, but encounters a deaf ear from his superior, Colonel Henderson, who is more concerned with the local merchants' caravans which are disappearing without a trace. To appease them, Henderson agrees to appoint a man to investigate, and Lewis believes it will be him. However, he is disappointed when Henderson gives the job to the newly arrived, oblivious Captain Connaught-Smith, the son of an old friend of Henderson.

Lewis believes an organised gang is murdering both the men and animals of the caravans and then burying the bodies, and suspects that the culprits have secret informants among the merchants of the city. He presents Connaught-Smith with his evidence and his theories, but is dismissed. He is also later caught by the Thugees and sentenced to die by the bite of a cobra, but is rescued by a pet mongoose, forcing the cult's high priest to release him. However, Connaught-Smith remains antagonistic and derisive towards Lewis, who eventually resigns his commission in frustration to investigate on his own.

Ram Das, Lewis's houseboy, believes he has seen his brother, Gopali, who disappeared some years ago, and receives permission to search for him. Lewis later learns that Ram Das has been killed by the Thugs, when his severed hand is tossed through the window of his bungalow. When searching for Gopali Das, the Thugs captured Ram Das and then compelled Gopali, a new initiate of the cult, to kill his brother. Meanwhile, the merchants decide to band together and create a super-caravan whose size, they believe, will discourage the bandits. The hidebound Captain Connaught-Smith leads the caravan and foolishly allows the stranglers (in the guise of travellers) to join them. That night, the Thugs strike with their usual success, and all caravan members, Connaught-Smith included, are slain and buried.

Lewis and Lt. Silver, a cult member, investigate the caravan's disappearance. Lewis sees the scar that marks Silver as a Thuggee follower of Kali and shoots him in self-defence. Lewis then discovers the buried bodies and returns to the cult's secret temple, where he is caught and set to die on a burning pyre. Gopali Das, however, now haunted by his brother's death at his own hands, frees Lewis, who casts the high priest onto the pyre instead, and the two men escape in the ensuing tumult. Lewis and Gopali race to meet Henderson, who is dining with Patel Shari, the merchants' local representative and secretly a member and informer of the Thugee cult. Gopali identifies Patel's chief servant as a Thug; Patel kills his follower to hold his tongue, but exposes himself with this action. Following this, Lewis's resignation is revoked, and he receives a promotion from Henderson for his help in exposing the Thuggee cult. The film ends with a narrative display detailing that the Thugee cult was subsequently wiped out by the British, and a quotation by Major General William Sleeman: "If we have done nothing else for India, we have done this one good thing."

== Cast ==
Uncredited roles are sourced from.

- Guy Rolfe as Captain Harry Lewis
- Allan Cuthbertson as Captain Christopher Connaught-Smuth
- Andrew Cruickshank as Colonel Henderson
- George Pastell as High Priest of Kali
- Marne Maitland as Patel Shari
- Jan Holden as Mary Lewis
- Paul Stassino as Lieutenant Silver
- Tutte Lemkow as Ram Das
- Roger Delgado as Bundar (uncredited)
- Marie Devereux as Karim (uncredited)
- Margaret Gordon as Mrs. Flood (uncredited)
- John Harvey as Burns (uncredited)
- Jack McNaughton as Corporal Roberts (uncredited)
- Warren Mitchell as merchant (uncredited)
- Michael Nightingale as Sidney Flood (uncredited)
- Steven Scott as Walters (uncredited)
- David Spenser as Gopali Das (uncredited)

== Production ==
Filming took place between 6 July 1959 and 27 August 1959. Bernard Robinson and Don Mingaye were art directors, John Peverall and Tom Walls were assistant directors, and Roy Ashton did makeup. The film's working title was The Horror of Thuggee, and later The Stranglers of Bengal, and was originally intended to be filmed in colour. Director Terence Fisher was surprised at how violent and horrific the film turned out to be, even after the censors had required cuts.,

== Release ==
The film premiered at the London Pavilion on 4 December 1959, and was released on 18 January 1960.

== Critical reception ==
The Monthly Film Bulletin wrote: "In spite of, or more probably because of, its veneer of historical truth, this is a particularly bestial contribution to the Hammer horror cycle: the parallels to much more recent atrocities seem more marked than ever. The production is the usual flea-bitten affair, unimaginatively unconvincing, quite without period sense, and relying almost entirely for its appeal on visual outrages – blindings, evisceration, human heads thrown on to dinner tables, and so forth – which gain if anything by being shot for once in black-and-white."

Picturegoer wrote: "Produced by the Hammer stable, this one runs true to form and splatters the screen evenly with gore; while the cast enters into the gruesome spirit of the thing enthusiastically."

Picture Show wrote: "Creepy title isn't it? ...Guy Rolfe plays a determined British officer who sets out to expose the Thugs and in doing so we are treated to a big dose of blood-letting, strangling, a fight between a snake and a mongoose and other gory pursuits. Gruesome. It's not for the sensitive."

Leslie Halliwell said: "semi-historical parade of atrocities, repellent but scarcely exciting."

In British Sound Films: The Studio Years 1928–1959 David Quinlan rated the film as "average", writing: "Grisly thriller."

== See also ==
- The Terror of the Tongs (1961), a quasi-remake by Hammer.
