= Mean Streak (song) =

1959 single by Cliff Richard and the Drifters

Single by Cliff Richard and the Drifters
- B-side: "Never Mind"
- Released: 1 May 1959
- Recorded: 14 November 1958
- Studio: EMI Studios, London
- Genre: Rock and roll
- Length: 2:00
- Label: Columbia
- Songwriters: Ian Samwell; Norrie Paramor
- Producer: Norrie Paramor

Cliff Richard and the Drifters singles chronology
| "Livin' Lovin' Doll" (1959) | "Mean Streak" (1959) | "Living Doll" (1959) |

"Mean Streak" is a song by Cliff Richard and the Drifters (who would later become the Shadows), released in May 1959 as their fourth single. It peaked at number 10 on the New Musical Express.

== Background and release ==
"Mean Streak" was written by former Drifters member Ian Samwell and producer Norrie Paramor under the pseudonym Joseph Seener. However, the latter was not originally credited on the release of the single.

Despite reaching a respectable number 10 position on the New Musical Express Top 30 (the canonical official UK Singles Chart), "Mean Streak" would have fared better were it not having to compete in the charts with its flip side "Never Mind", which peaked at number 21. In comparison, on other major UK charts at the time, Disc, Melody Maker and Record Mirror, where the two songs jointly charted, the peak positions were higher.

== Track listing ==
1. "Mean Streak" – 2:00
2. "Never Mind" – 2:01

== Personnel ==
- Cliff Richard – vocals
- Hank Marvin – lead guitar
- Bruce Welch – rhythm guitar
- Jet Harris – bass guitar
- Terry Smart – drums

== Charts ==
"Mean Streak"

| Chart (1959) | Peak position |
|---|---|
| UK Disc Top 20 | 5 |
| UK Melody Maker Top 20 | 7 |
| UK New Musical Express Top 30 | 10 |
| UK Record Mirror Top 20 | 8 |

"Never Mind"

| Chart (1959) | Peak position |
|---|---|
| Norway (VG-lista) | 5 |
| UK New Musical Express Top 30 | 21 |
