= Roulette (instrumental) =

Single by Russ Conway
- A-side: "Roulette"
- B-side: "Trampolina"
- Released: 1959
- Genre: Instrumental
- Length: 1:50
- Label: EMI Columbia Records
- Songwriter(s): Russ Conway ("Roulette"); Geoff Love ("Trampolina")
- Producer(s): Geoff Love

"Roulette" is a piano instrumental by Russ Conway.

It was the second and final of his two No. 1 hits in the UK Singles Chart, the first being "Side Saddle".
