= Russ Conway =

English pianist (1925–2000)

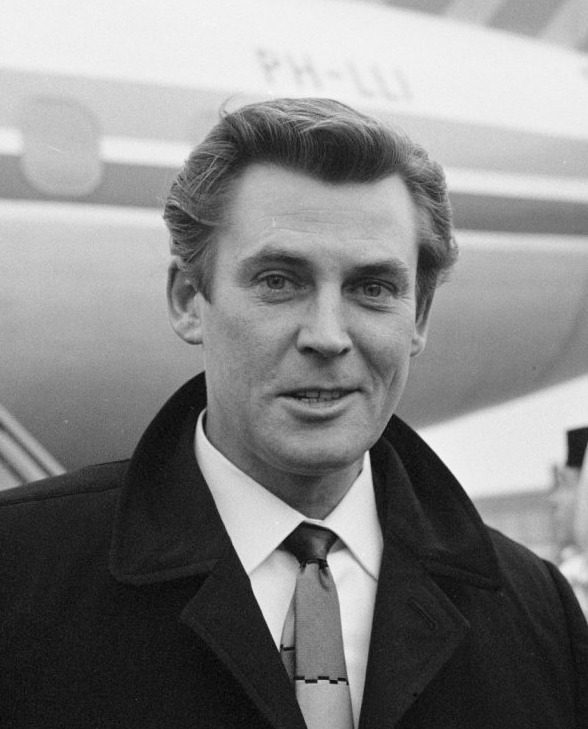
- Russ Conway in 1962

Background information
- Born: Trevor Herbert Stanford; 2 September 1925; Bristol, England
- Died: 16 November 2000 (aged 75) Eastbourne, Sussex, England
- Occupation: Musician
- Instrument: Piano
- Years active: 1955–2000
- Labels: Columbia (EMI), Chapter One, Pye, MusicMedia, Churchill

Russ Conway (born Trevor Herbert Stanford; 2 September 1925 – 16 November 2000) was an English popular music pianist and composer. Conway had 20 piano instrumentals in the UK Singles Chart between 1957 and 1963, including two number one hits.

== Early life ==
Trevor Herbert Stanford was born on 2 September 1925 in Bristol, England. His mother, Patara Mallia (née Green) was an amateur pianist and contralto, and his father, Herbert Stanford, a clerical worker. Stanford won a scholarship to Bristol Cathedral Choir School.

After leaving school, aged 14, he attended secretarial college before working as a solicitor's clerk. The employment ended when, on his fifteen birthday, Stanford was sent to a Borstal detention centre for a three-year term after stealing some money he found in a packet. It was in borstal that he taught himself the piano. A few months later, in January 1941, his mother died.

Following his release from borstal, his father sent him to a Merchant Navy Training School. During the Second World War, in 1942, he was conscripted into the Royal Navy and was awarded the Distinguished Service Medal as signalman in a minesweeping flotilla "for distinguished service, efficiency and zeal" in clearance of mines in the Aegean and operations during the relief of Greece 1944–45. During his Navy service, he lost the tip of the ring finger of his right hand while using a bread slicer. At the end of the war, he chose to remain in the Navy, but was discharged in 1948 because of a stomach ulcer. He joined the Merchant Navy as a baggage steward with P&O, but left after a recurrence of the complaint.

== Career ==
In 1955, Stanford was talent-spotted while playing in a London club, and was signed to EMI's Columbia label. At Columbia, he worked with Norman Newell, who suggested he adopt the stage name of Russ Conway ('Conway' from Newell's early recording association with the singer Steve Conway, and 'Russ' from the Russ Henderson Steel Band). Conway spent the mid-1950s providing backing for artists including Gracie Fields and Joan Regan. He recorded his first solo single, "Roll The Carpet Up" (coupled with "The Westminster Waltz") in 1957, and later that year had his first hit with "Party Pops", a piano medley of well known songs.

In 1956, Conway (credited as 'Terry Stanford') composed the music for a BBC Television production of Beauty and the Beast.

Between 1957 and 1963, Conway had 20 UK chart hits, and in 1959 alone he achieved a cumulative total of 83 weeks on the UK Singles Chart. This included two self-penned number one instrumentals, "Side Saddle" and "Roulette". Conway appeared frequently on light entertainment television shows and radio for many years afterwards, performing at the London Palladium on a number of occasions and becoming a regular on the Billy Cotton Band Show for several series. He also made recordings as a vocalist. Many of his hits featured accompaniment directed by Geoff Love.

In 1958, Conway (as "Trevor H. Stanford") composed, with Norman Newell, the music for the flop musical Mister Venus, which starred Frankie Howerd and Anton Diffring, The show, with book by Ray Galton and Johnny Speight, opened at the Prince of Wales Theatre on 23 October 1958, but closed after just sixteen performances.

He was the subject of This Is Your Life in 1959, when he was surprised by Eamonn Andrews during a recording session at the BBC's Studio 1 at 201 Piccadilly, London.

Conway appeared as himself in French and Saunders' 1994 Christmas special, playing "Side Saddle", or, in an alternative edit, the Gerry and the Pacemakers hit "I Like It", in their spoof of The Piano.

== Personal life and death ==
Conway's career was blighted by ill health, including a nervous breakdown and subsequently a stroke, which prevented him from performing between 1968 and 1971. He also at times drank heavily and smoked up to 80 cigarettes a day. He was prescribed anti-depressants and had periods of severe self-doubt, but he kept up playing. Having been diagnosed with stomach cancer in the late 1980s, in 1990 he founded the Russ Conway Cancer Fund with his friend, writer and broadcaster Richard Hope-Hawkins, and they staged charity gala shows in major theatres that raised thousands of pounds for cancer charities.

In the documentary Frankie Howerd: The Lost Tapes, Barry Cryer, commenting on Howerd not coming out as gay, also said that Russ Conway did not, as in 'those days' it would have been career suicide. Conway said in 1995 that he was unsure about his sexuality: "I haven't the faintest idea what it is....I was certainly no angel in my younger days and I have tried everything there is to try."

Conway, who never married, died on 16 November 2000, just two weeks after his last public performance.

Richard Hope-Hawkins delivered the main eulogy at the funeral held at the historic St Mary's Church, Redcliffe, Bristol. Elton John sent a wreath. In 2001 Hope-Hawkins devised, staged and directed a tribute to Conway at the Colston Hall, Bristol, with an all-star cast. The £11,000 raised by the event was donated to St Peter's Hospice, Bristol.

Conway could not read music, so the published sheet music of his work is inaccurate and simplified. Pianist Mike Thomson (1946–2018) produced some faithful transcriptions, but they were not able to be fully published due to copyright issues.

The remaining music library of his arrangements are in the custody of Gavin Sutherland.

== Discography ==
=== LPs ===
- Piano Requests (1958)
- Pack Up Your Troubles (1958) – UK Albums Chart No. 9
- Songs To Sing in Your Bath (1959) – UK No. 8
- Family Favourites (1959) – UK No. 3
- Time To Celebrate (1959) – UK No. 3
- My Concerto For You (1960) – UK No. 5
- Party Time (1960) – UK No. 7
- At the Theatre (1961)
- At the Cinema (1961)
- Happy Days (1961)
- Concerto For Dreamers (1962)
- Russ Conway's Trad Party (1962)
- Something For Mum (1963)
- Enjoy Yourself (1964)
- Concerto for Lovers (1964)
- Roll Up The Carpet (1964)*
- Russ Conway Favourites (1965)*
- Once More it's Party Time (1965)
- Russ Hour (1966)
- Time to Play (1966)
- Pop-a-Conway (1966)
- Concerto for Memories (1966)
- Russ Conway Plays (1968)*
- Russ Conway plays Jolson Hits (1969)*
- The New Side of Russ Conway (1971)
- Russ Conway playing the Great Piano Hits (1973)
- Russ Conway with Songs from Stage & Screen (1974)
- The Very Best of Russ Conway (1976)*
- Russ Conway Presents 24 Piano Greats (1977)* – UK No. 25
- Russ Conway - The One and Only (1979)*
- Always You and Me (1981)* - double LP comprising My Concerto for You and Concerto for Memories
- Russ Conway and his Happy Piano (1985)
- The Two Sides of Russ Conway (1986)*
- A Long Time Ago (1986)
- Russ Conway: The Best of the EMI Years (1989)*
- Russ Conway: The EP Collection (1991)*
- Russ Conway At Home (1994)
- Old and New (1999)
- Nobody Wants To Be Forgotten (2000) — reissue of Old and New

* denotes compilation albums.

=== Singles ===
Year	Single	Peak chart positions		
Year	Single	UK	AUS	US
1957	"Roll the Carpet Up" / "The Westminster Waltz"	—	—	—
1957	"Soho Fair" / "The Spotlight Waltz"	—	—	—
1957	"The Red Cat (Le Chat Rouge)" / "Late Extra"	—	—	—
1957	"Piano Pops No. 1"	—	—	—
1957	"Party Pops"	24	—	—
1957	"Scot Pops"	—	—	—
1957	"The Harry Lime Theme" / "The Lantern Slide"	—	—	—
1958	"Party Pops (No. 2)"	—	—	—
1958	"Pal Joey Pops"	—	—	—
1958	"Piano Pops (No. 3)"	—	—	—
1958	"South Pacific Pops"	—	—	—
1958	"Piano Pops (No. 4)"	—	—	—
1958	"Piano Pops (No. 5)"	—	—	—
1958	"Got a Match" / "Toby's Walk"	30	—	—
1958	"Piano Pops (No. 6)"	—	—	—
1958	"My Fair Lady Pops"	—	—	—
1958	"More Party Pops"	10	—	—
1958	"The World Outside (Theme from the Warsaw Concerto)" / "Love Like Ours"	24	—	—
1959	"Piano Pops No. 7"	—	—	—
1959	"Side Saddle" / "Pixilated Penguin"	1	78	—
1959	"Piano Pops No. 8"	—	—	—
1959	"Roulette" / "Trampolina"	1	71	106
1959	"Piano Pops No. 9"	—	—	—
1959	"China Tea" / "The Wee Boy of Brussels"	5	—	—
1959	"Song from North By Northwest" / "Theme from The Scapegoat"	—	—	—
1959	"Snow Coach" / "Time to Celebrate"	7	—	—
1959	"More and More Party Pops"	5	—	—
1960	"Royal Event" / "Rule, Britannia!"	15	—	—
1960	"Medley of Tunes from Fings Ain't Wot They Used T'be"	47	—	—
1960	"Lucky Five" / "The Birthday Cakewalk"	14	—	—
1960	"Piano Pops No. 10"	—	—	—
1960	"Passing Breeze" / "The Key To Love"	16	91 (B-side)	—
1960	"Even More Party Pops"	27	—	—
1961	"Pepe" / "Matador from Trinidad"	19	—	—
1961	"Parade of the Poppets" / "Lulu"	—	—	—
1961	"Pablo" / "The Singing Bells"	45	—	—
1961	"Say It with Flowers" / "Roses of Picardy" (with Dorothy Squires)	23	—	—
1961	"Toy Balloons" / "Forgotten Dreams"	7	—	—
1962	"Lesson One" / "Angelo"	21	—	—
1962	"Concerto for Dreamers" / "Primera"	—	—	—
1962	"Blitz Medley" / "Oliver! Medley"	—	—	—
1962	"Always You and Me" / "Alone Again"	33	—	—
1962	"Russ Conway's Sing Song Medley"	—	—	—
1963	"Gigolo" / "Terry's Toon"	—	—	—
1963	"Flamenco" / "Tell Me In September (Dimelo en Septiembre)"	—	—	—
1963	"Liverpool Pops"	—	—	—
1963	"Gold Rush" / "Halloween (Europa Melody)	—	—	—
1963	"Conway Capers No. 1"	—	—	—
1964	"Mack the Knife" / "A Bedouin in Baghdad"	—	—	—
1964	"Conway Capers No. 2"	—	—	—
1964	"Concerto for Lovers" / "Love is the Sweetest Thing"	—	—	—
1965	"Little Leprechaun" / "Falling Tears"	—	—	—
1965	"The Beggars of Rome" / "The Urchins of Paris"	—	—	—
1965	"I'm Shy, Mary Ellen I'm Shy" / "I See the Moon"	—	—	—
1966	"The Crunch" / "The Patient Heart"	—	—	—
1966	"Celebration Day" / "Girl In My Soup"	—	—	—
1966	"Swinging Pops"	—	—	—
1968	"Pink Piano" / "Il Buffu (The Clown)" (as The Russ Conway Sound)	—	—	—
1970	"Polonaise" / "Villa D'Amour"	—	—	—
1970	"Love Is All" / "Lara's Theme from 'Doctor Zhivago'"	—	—	—
1971	"How Small We Are, How Little We Know" / "When I Grow Too Old to Dream"	—	—	—
1971	"Aranjuez, Mon Amour" / "Up, Up and Away"	—	—	—
1972	"The Boy Friend"	—	—	—
1973	"Life Is Good" / "Long Nosed Nellie"	—	—	—
1974	"Bordello" / "A Place Like This"	—	—	—
1974	"She" / "Eye Level"	—	—	—
1976	"Love Is a Many Splendored Thing" / "Life is Good"	—	—	—
1977	"A Welsh Melody" / "Don't Cry for Me Argentina" (with The Mike Sammes Singers)	—	—	—
1984	"Theme from The Terry Fox Story" / "Floriana"	—	—	—
1989	"Bareback" / "Side Saddle MkII"	—	—	—
"—" denotes releases that did not chart.

== See also ==
- List of best-selling music artists
