= High Class Baby =

1958 single by Cliff Richard and the Drifters

Single by Cliff Richard with the Drifters
- B-side: "My Feet Hit the Ground"
- Released: 14 November 1958
- Recorded: 3 October 1958
- Studio: EMI Studios, London
- Genre: Rock and roll
- Length: 2:09
- Label: Columbia
- Songwriter: Ian Samwell
- Producer: Norrie Paramor

Cliff Richard with the Drifters singles chronology
"Move It" (1958)	"High Class Baby" (1958)	"Livin' Lovin' Doll" (1959)

"High Class Baby" is a song by Cliff Richard and the Drifters (who would later become the Shadows), released in November 1958 as their second single. It peaked at number 7 on the New Musical Express chart.

== Recording and reception ==
"High Class Baby" was written by Ian Samwell about actress Julie Cracknell, mother of singer Sarah Cracknell, who had spurned his advances.

Both sides were recorded on 3 October 1958 at EMI Studios (later renamed Abbey Road Studios), two days before Cliff Richard and the Drifters went on tour for the first time. Like with "Move It", producer Norrie Paramor hired session musicians Ernie Shear and Frank Clarke to play on the record. However, Richard has said that "it didn't compare in any way to "Move It"" and that he cried when he got home, believing that his career was over.

"Don't Bug Me Baby", originally by little-known American singer Milton Allen, was intended to be the follow-up to "Move It". However, it was shelved in favour of "High Class Baby" after a disjointed recording of it and because it was felt that "High Class Baby" had a more "British sound" to it. "Don't Bug Me Baby" was later re-recorded for Richard's album Cliff.

After its release, "High Class Baby" was banned by the BBC, as the lyrics mention a Cadillac car, which the BBC saw as a breach of advertising regulations.

Reviewing for Disc, Don Nicholl described "High Class Baby" as "a furious rock number that will rattle the teeth in your head; it is put out like a machine-gun gone beserk [sic]" and has "plenty of twangy guitar in the rhythm backing".

== Track listing ==
1. "High Class Baby" – 2:09
2. "My Feet Hit the Ground" – 1:59

== Personnel ==
- Cliff Richard – vocals
- Ian Samwell – guitar
- Ernie Shear – guitar
- Frank Clarke – upright bass
- Terry Smart – drums

== Charts ==
Chart (1958–59)	Peak position
Norway (VG-lista)	3
UK Disc Top 20	4
UK Melody Maker Top 20	6
UK New Musical Express Top 30	7
UK Record Mirror Top 20	5

== Cover versions ==
- In 1961, a Spanish-language version, titled "Presumida", by Mexican band Los Teen Tops was a number-one hit in Mexico.
