= Serious Charge =

1959 British film by Terence Young

- Directed by: Terence Young
- Screenplay by: Guy Elmes and Mickey Delamar
- Based on: Serious Charge by Philip King
- Produced by: Mickey Delamar
- Starring: Anthony Quayle; Sarah Churchill; Andrew Ray; Cliff Richard; Liliane Brousse
- Cinematography: Georges Perinal B.S.C.
- Edited by: Reginald Beck
- Music by: Leighton Lucas
- Production companies: Alva Films; A Mickey Delamar Production
- Distributed by: Eros Films Ltd
- Release date: 14 May 1959
- Running time: 87 minutes
- Country: United Kingdom
- Language: English

Serious Charge (U.S.: A Touch of Hell, also known as Immoral Charge) is a 1959 British film, directed by Terence Young and starring Anthony Quayle, Sarah Churchill, Andrew Ray and Irene Browne. It was produced and co-written by Mickey Delamar and Guy Elmes, and adapted from the 1956 stage play of the same name by Philip King. The film is notable for the screen acting debut of Cliff Richard in a minor role.

== Plot ==
Unmarried ex-army vicar Reverend Howard Phillips, newly arrived in the parish, attempts to get local 19-year-old thug and petty criminal Larry Thompson to face up to his responsibilities to Mary Williams, the naive young girl he has made pregnant. When Howard threatens to tell his coffee-bar friends, Larry trashes the room and fakes a struggle. As a dishevelled Larry leaves, Hester Peters arrives, and he tells her that Howard "interfered" with him. Hester is the daughter of the parish's previous clergyman and has become infatuated with the athletic and handsome new vicar. However, having earlier seen a young girl leaving the vicarage late one night (Mary, who had sought the vicar's advice about her pregnancy), Hester jumps to the conclusion the two are romantically linked and chooses to believe Larry's account. Shortly afterwards, Mary chances across Larry kissing another girl, and in distress blindly stumbles across the road into the path of a car, and is killed.

As a consequence of the malicious accusation, Howard is subjected to suspicion and abuse by his parishioners, including having his car's tyres slashed and receiving poison pen letters. When his mother learns of events, knowing about Hester's romantic interest in Howard, she quickly comprehends the situation, takes Hester to task, and persuades her to accept Howard's account. Larry duly receives his come-uppance at the hands of his father.

== Cast ==
- Anthony Quayle as Howard Phillips
- Sarah Churchill as Hester Peters
- Andrew Ray as Larry Thompson
- Irene Browne as Mrs Phillips
- Percy Herbert as Mr Thompson
- Noel Howlett as Mr Peters
- Wensley Pithey as police sergeant
- Leigh Madison as Mary Williams
- Judith Furse as probation officer
- Jean Cadell as almshouse matron
- Wilfrid Brambell as Verger
- Olive Sloane as Mrs Browning
- George Roderick as fishmonger
- Cliff Richard as Curley Thompson
- Liliane Brousse as Michelle
- Wilfred Pickles as chairman of the court
- Philip Lowrie as Larry's friend
- Jess Conrad as Teddy Boy
- Marie Devereux as attractive girl in coffee bar

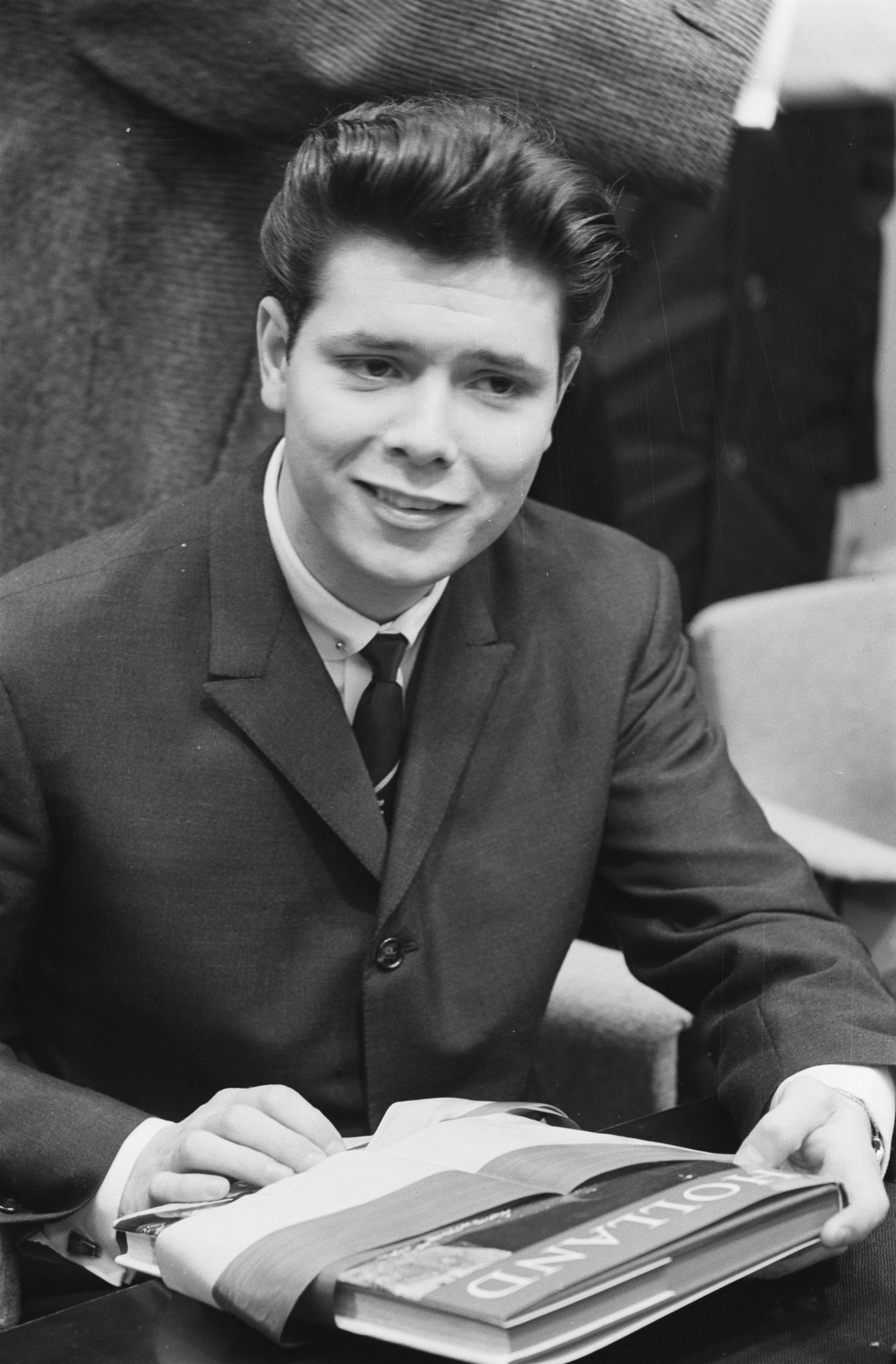
Serious Charge was the debut film of pop singer Cliff Richard.

== Production ==
It was the film debut of Cliff Richard, at that time a teenage pop idol. Richard sings three songs written by Lionel Bart, although none is heard in its entirety: "No Turning Back", "Mad About You", and "Living Doll" (the latter a different version from the No. 1 hit in the British singles chart).

The scene at the lido was captured in three distinct versions. Harrison Marks model Jean Sporle appeared topless for the French market. In the second, she sported a bikini, catering to UK tastes. The third had her donning a petticoat for the US market.

== Reception ==
=== Box office ===
According to Kinematograph Weekly the film performed "better than average" at the British box office in 1959.

=== Critical ===
The Monthly Film Bulletin wrote: "The story in outline seems melodramatic and contrived, but an imaginative script, sensitive and crisp direction, and the authoritative performance of Anthony Quayle make this an absorbing film. If some of the background detail seems unconvincing (the juvenile delinquents are seen from the conventional middle-class viewpoint, and the vicars, retired or active, enjoy too luxurious a standard of living) the personal conflicts that occupy the foreground are authentic and well observed."

In British Sound Films: The Studio Years 1928–1959 David Quinlan rated the film as "good", writing: "Good drama with (less successful) serious undertones."
