= Side Saddle =

Single by Russ Conway

from the EP Another Six
- B-side: "Pixilated Penguin"
- Released: February 1959
- Genre: Popular music, piano music
- Label: Columbia
- Songwriter(s): Trevor Stanford
- Producer(s): Norman Newell

Official audio
- "Side Saddle" on YouTube

"Side Saddle" is a hit single which was number one in the UK Singles Chart for four weeks from 27 March 1959.

The honky-tonk style tune, composed by British popular music pianist Russ Conway under his real name Trevor Stanford, was written as part of the score for a television musical adaptation of Beauty and the Beast. Asked to compose a tune at short notice, Conway wrote an "olde-world gavotte" which he called "Side Saddle". The song was a staple of the BBC's Housewives' Choice radio programme.
