= Whodini discography =

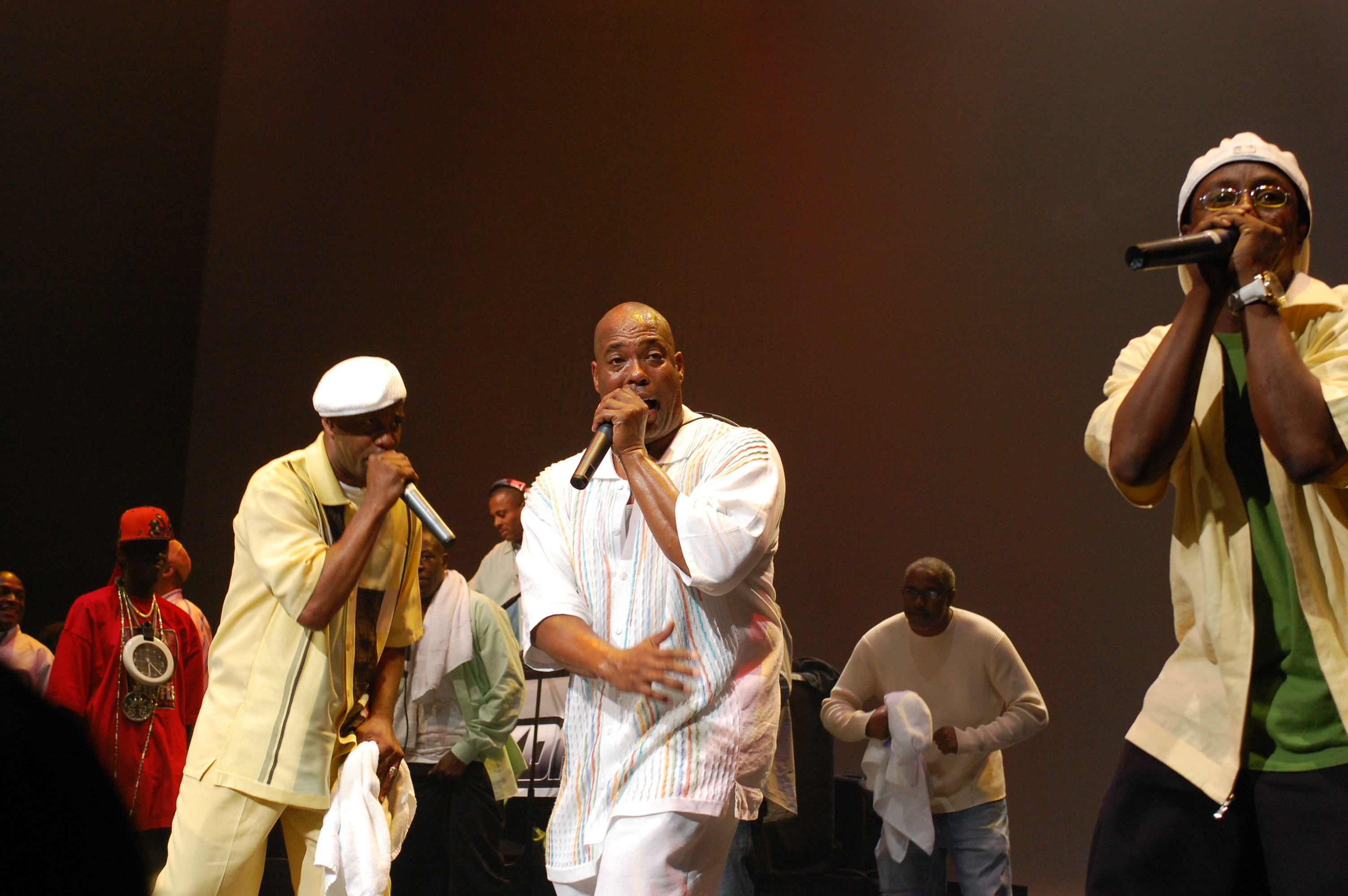
Whodini

The discography of Whodini consists of six studio albums and twenty-seven singles.

== Albums ==
=== Studio albums ===
List of studio albums, with selected chart positions and certifications
Title	Album details	Peak chart positions			Certifications
Title	Album details	US	US R&B /HH	GER	Certifications
Whodini	Released: October 13, 1983; Label: Jive/Arista; Format: CD (re-issue), LP, Cassette, digital download, streaming	—	—	42	
Escape	Released: October 17, 1984; Label: Jive/Arista; Format: CD (re-issue), LP, Cassette, digital download, streaming	35	5	—	RIAA: Platinum
Back in Black	Released: April 29, 1986; Label: Jive/Arista; Format: CD, cassette, digital download, LP, streaming	35	4	—	RIAA: Gold
Open Sesame	Released: August 27, 1987; Label: Jive; Format: CD, cassette, digital download, LP, streaming	30	8	—	RIAA: Gold
Bag-a-Trix	Released: March 19, 1991; Label: MCA; Format: CD, cassette, digital download, LP, streaming	—	48	—	
Six	Released: September 17, 1996; Label: So So Def · Columbia; Format: CD, cassette, digital download, LP, streaming	—	55	—	
"—" denotes a recording that did not chart or was not released in that territory.

=== Compilation albums ===
- Greatest Hits (1990)
- Funky Beat: The Best of Whodini (2006)

== Singles ==
=== Featured singles ===
List of singles, with selected chart positions
Title	Year	Peak chart positions							Album
Title	Year	US	US Dance	US R&B	US Rap	GER	NZ	UK	Album
"Magic's Wand"	1982	—	11	45	*	50	20	47	Whodini
"Haunted House of Rock"	1983	—	27	55	*	21	42	82	Whodini
"Rap Machine"	1983	—	—	—	*	56	—	—	Whodini
"Nasty Lady"	1983	—	—	—	*	—	—	—	Whodini
"Yours for a Night"	1983	—	—	—	*	—	—	—	Whodini
"Friends/Five Minutes of Funk"	1984	87	25	4	*	—	—	—	Escape
"Freaks Come Out at Night"	1985	104	25	43	*	—	—	97	The Jewel of the Nile Soundtrack and Escape
"Big Mouth"	1985	—	30	64	*	—	—	—	Escape
"Escape (I Need a Break)"	1985	—	31	—	*	—	—	—	Escape
"Funky Beat"	1986	—	30	19	*	—	—	—	Back in Black
"One Love"	1986	—	34	10	*	—	—	—	Back in Black
"Growing Up"	1986	—	—	58	*	—	—	—	Back in Black
"Be Yourself" (featuring Millie Jackson)	1987	—	— (Note: "How Ya Like Me Now" did not enter the Dance Club Songs, but peaked at number 48 on the Dance/Electronic Singles Sales.)	20	*	—	—	—	Open Sesame
"Rock You Again (Again & Again)"	1987	—	—	—	*	—	—	—	Open Sesame
"Life Is Like a Dance"	1987	—	—	—	*	—	—	—	Open Sesame
"You Brought It on Yourself"	1988	—	—	—	*	—	—	—	Open Sesame
"Any Way I Gotta Swing It"	1989	—	—	—	—	—	—	—	A Nightmare on Elm Street 5: The Dream Child Soundtrack
"Freaks"	1991	—	—	73	—	—	—	—	Bag-a-Trix
"Judy/Inside the Joint"	1991	—	—	65	—	—	—	—	Bag-a-Trix
"Smilin' Faces Sometimes"	1991	—	—	—	—	—	—	—	Bag-a-Trix
"Keep Running Back"	1996	—	—	69	27	—	—	—	Six
"—" denotes a recording that did not chart or was not released in that territory. "*" indicates a chart that did not exist at the time.

== Soundtracks ==
List of soundtracks featuring songs by Whodini
Year	Title	Song	Release date
1985	The Jewel of the Nile	"Freaks Come Out at Night"	December 11, 1985
1986	Trick or Treat	"The Haunted House of Rock"	October 24, 1986
1989	A Nightmare on Elm Street 5: The Dream Child	"Anyway I Gotta Swing It"	August 11, 1989
1997	Chasing Amy	"Be Yourself"	April 18, 1997
1999	The Wood	"Freaks Come Out at Night"	July 16, 1999
2000	Juggalo Championshxt Wrestling Volume 1	"Devil Without a Cause"	May 9, 2000
2001	Glitter	"Freaks Come Out at Night"	September 21, 2001
2002	Grand Theft Auto: Vice City (video game)	"Magic's Wand", "Freaks Come Out at Night"	October 29, 2002
2005	Cursed	"Freaks Come Out at Night"	March 3, 2005
2005	Everybody Hates Chris (TV series), episode "Everybody Hates Halloween"	"Freaks Come Out at Night"	October 27, 2005
2005	Everybody Hates Chris (TV series), episode "Everybody Hates Greg"	"Friends"	November 24, 2005
2006	El cantante	"Five Minutes of Funk"	September 12, 2006
2006	Everybody Hates Chris (TV series), episode "Everybody Hates Rejection"	"Five Minutes of Funk"	October 1, 2006
2006	Grand Theft Auto: Vice City Stories (video game)	"Freaks Come Out at Night"	October 31, 2006
2006	Blood Diamond	"From tha Streetz"	December 8, 2006
2007	Illegal Tender	"Friends"	August 24, 2007
2014	Ping Pong Summer	"Friends"	June 6, 2014
2014	Red Oaks (TV series), episode "Pilot"	"Freaks Come Out at Night"	August 28, 2014
2015	Black-ish (TV series), episode "Jacked o' Lantern"	"Freaks Come Out at Night"	October 28, 2015
