= The Big House =

The Big House may refer to:

== Buildings ==
=== Types of building ===
- Great house
- Anglo-Irish big house, specifically houses of the Protestant ascendancy
- a type of longhouse among the cultures of the Pacific Northwest Coast
- Wharenui, a communal house of the Māori people of New Zealand
- a slang term for prison
- An African-American Vernacular English term referring to a plantation house on an American slave compound.

=== Individual buildings ===
- 8 House or Big House, a mixed use development in Ørestad, Copenhagen, Denmark
- Bolshoy Dom (Russian for 'Big House'), Saint Petersburg, Russia, headquarters of the Federal Security Service
- Big House, Landshipping, Pembrokeshire, Wales
- Ibrox Stadium, Glasgow, Scotland, nicknamed 'The Big Hoose'
- Big House, Irene, Gauteng, South Africa, the residence of South African statesman Jan Smuts

==== United States ====
- The Allman Brothers Band Museum, Macon, Georgia, also known as "The Big House"
- Big House (Moccasin, Arizona)
- Oklahoma State Fair Arena, Oklahoma City
- Big House (Palisades, New York)
- Michigan Stadium, Ann Arbor, Michigan, nicknamed The Big House

== Entertainment ==
- The Big House (1930 film), starring Chester Morris, Wallace Beery and Robert Montgomery
- The Big House (2000 film), short film directed by Rachel Ward
- The Big House (documentary film), 1997 documentary film directed by David Goldie
- The Big House (TV series), a 2004 American television sitcom
- "The Big House" (Brooklyn Nine-Nine), a 2017 television episode
- "The Big House" (Orange Is the New Black), a 2019 television episode
- Big House (comics), a fictional prison in the Marvel Comics universe
- Big House (American band), a country music band from the late 1990s
  - Big House (album), their self-titled debut album
- Big House (Canadian band), a Canadian rock music band active in the early 1990s
- "Big House" (song), a 1993 song by Christian rock band Audio Adrenaline

== Other uses ==
- The Big House (tournament), an annual Super Smash Bros. tournament in Michigan
- Clarence "Big House" Gaines, American basketball coach

== See also ==
- The Big Hoose, Scottish prison Barlinnie in Glasgow
- House (disambiguation)
- Big (disambiguation)
