= Unplug It In =

EP by Eddie Money
- Released: November 3, 1992
- Recorded: May 14–15, 1992
- Genre: Rock, pop rock
- Length: 28:53
- Label: Columbia
- Producer: Monty Byrom, Eddie Money, Frank Anthony

Eddie Money chronology
| Right Here (1991) | Unplug It In (1992) | Love and Money (1995) |

Professional ratings
Review scores
| Source | Rating |
|---|---|
| AllMusic | link |

Unplug It In is an acoustic EP by Eddie Money, released in 1992. Tracks were recorded live during the "Unplugged Tour" at The Back Alley in Houston, Texas, and Backroom in Austin, Texas.

== Track listing ==
1. "Gimme Some Water" – 3:38
2. "She Takes My Breath Away" – 3:47
3. "Save a Little Room in Your Heart for Me" – 4:26
4. "You've Really Got a Hold On Me" (Smokey Robinson & The Miracles cover) – 4:18
5. "Two Tickets To Paradise" – 3:34
6. "Trinidad" – 4:45
7. "Fall in Love Again" – 4:21

== Personnel ==
- Eddie Money - Vocals
- Tommy Girvin - Guitar
- Monty Byrom - Guitars, vocals
- Brian Gary - Piano, Organ
- John Snider Jr. - Drums and Percussion
- Don Schiff - Bass
