= I'll Get By =

I'll Get By may refer to:

- "I'll Get By (As Long as I Have You)", a popular song with music by Fred E. Ahlert and lyrics by Roy Turk
- "I'll Get By" (song), a 1991 song by Eddie Money
- I'll Get By (film), a 1950 film starring June Haver, Gloria DeHaven and William Lundigan
- I'll Get By, a 1990 record by Della Griffin
