= Romeo's Daughter =

UK rock band

- Origin: United Kingdom
- Genres: Album-oriented rock; hard rock; pop rock
- Years active: 1985–1995; 2009–present
- Labels: Jive; Music for Nations
- Members: Leigh Matty; Craig Joiner; Andy Wells; Stephen Drennan
- Website: romeosdaughter.co.uk

Romeo's Daughter are a British AOR, contemporary and mainstream rock band. Formed in 1985, the band's self-titled debut album was co-produced by Mutt Lange and John Parr. Romeo's Daughter disbanded shortly after releasing their second studio album, Delectable, in 1995.

Following a reissue campaign of their first two albums, Romeo's Daughter reformed in 2009 and released subsequent albums Rapture (2012), Spin (2015) and Slipstream (2023). Their lineup currently features Leigh Matty, Craig Joiner, Andy Wells and Steve Drennan. In 2024, Classic Rock listed Matty at 24th in their list of 40 Best AOR Voices of All Time.

== History ==
The original manager of the band was Olga Lange, then the wife of Robert John "Mutt" Lange. Mutt Lange was impressed by their songwriting abilities and agreed to produce (part of) their debut album. Hence, Romeo's Daughter was often seen as protégés of Mutt Lange.

The first album contained the singles "Don't Break My Heart", "I Cry Myself to Sleep at Night", covered by Bonnie Tyler and Chrissy Steele and "Heaven in the Back Seat", the latter from the A Nightmare on Elm Street 5: The Dream Child soundtrack. The album was produced by Mutt Lange and John Parr. "Wild Child" (written by Mutt Lange) was later covered by Heart on the Brigade album, and "Heaven in the Back Seat" was covered by Eddie Money on his 1991 album, Right Here.

The second album, Delectable was a more mature affair, although it was released on the smaller Music for Nations label so got less exposure. Mitman went on to work with FM and other bands while the band broke up in the mid-1990s.

On 25 February 2008, Romeo's Daughter's first studio album was reissued by Rock Candy Records on CD with bonus material, a 16-page full colour booklet with original and new artwork, etc. After this reissue Romeo's Daughter reformed and were performing shows. These appearances included a small warm up gig on 13 October 2009, and their main event of 2009 was Firefest VI at Nottingham Rock City on 24 October 2009.

In 2009, the band announced that they would be releasing new material through Riff City Records in the "near future". The band played some dates during 2010 and performed new material. The band's second album, Delectable, was reissued in July 2011.

On 22 October 2011, Romeo's Daughter released a three-track live EP available via download sites such as iTunes.

In 2012, the band released Rapture, their first new album in 19 years. Classic Rock described it as "a shade warmer and less clinical" than their debut. The album's lead single, "Bittersweet", was listed in Classic Rock's Top Songs of 2012. Leigh Matty was also listed at No. 5 on their Top Lady Rock Singer of All Time list. Romeo's Daughter embarked on the Rapture Tour across the UK in 2012 and 2013, with festival dates at Fairport's Cropredy Convention and Hard Rock Hell. A live show at the Derby Guildhall was recorded and released as a live album and DVD, Alive, in 2014.

In 2015, the band released another album of new music titled Spin, which they toured Europe to promote.

Romeo's Daughter released their fifth studio album, Slipstream, on 31 August 2023. Simon Bray of Sea of Tranquility noted the band's shift towards guitar riff-oriented music compared to their previous albums. Paul Sabin of Metal Planet Music described Slipstream as a "sparkling piece of work". The band announced the Slipstream Tour in support of the album, which took place between September and November 2023 in the UK, including a performance at WinterStorm festival.

In 2024, the band continued to tour, with upcoming dates at Love Live Festival in Blackpool, UK, and Malmö Melodic in Sweden. Romeo's Daughter supported FM in Birmingham as part of their Old Habits Die Hard Tour in May. Classic Rock placed Leigh Matty at No. 24 on their list of the 40 Best AOR Vocalists of All Time in 2024.

Romeo's Daughter are managed by Juliet Sharman Matthews at JPSM Management who worked with them at Jive Records.

== Members ==
=== Current ===
- Leigh Matty - lead vocals
- Craig Joiner - guitar
- Stephen Drennan - bass
- Andy Wells - drums

=== Former ===
- Paul King - drums
- Anthony "Tony, Slim" Mitman - keyboards
- Jeff Knowler - keyboards
- Ed "Slam" Poole - Bass

== Discography ==
=== Albums ===
- Romeo's Daughter (1988)
- Delectable (1993)
- Rapture (2012)
- Spin (2015)
- Slipstream (2023)

=== EPs ===
- Live EP (2011)
- Organik (2020)

=== Singles ===
- "Don't Break My Heart" (1988) US No. 73
- "I Cry Myself to Sleep at Night" (1988)
- "Heaven in the Back Seat" (1989) UK No. 97
- "Attracted to the Animal" (1993)
- "Bittersweet" (2012)
- "Alive" (2013)

=== Live albums ===
- Alive (2014)
- Time of Your Life (2025)

=== Contributions to soundtracks ===
- A Nightmare on Elm Street 5: The Dream Child soundtrack (1989)
