= Don't Break My Heart =

Don't Break My Heart is the title of several songs, including:

- "Don't Break My Heart" (La Toya Jackson song)
- "Don't Break My Heart" (Vaya Con Dios song)
- "Don't Break My Heart" (Romeo's Daughter song)
- "Don't Break My Heart" (UB40 song)
- "Don't Break My Heart" (Nicola song)
- "Don't Break My Heart" (Italo disco project Den Harrow song from 1987)
- "Don't Break My Heart" by Black Panther
- "Don't Break My Heart" by Paolo Conte
- "Don't Break My Heart" by Suzi Quatro, from the album Aggro-Phobia
- "Don't Break My Heart" by the Weeknd, from the album Dawn FM

== See also ==
- "Don't Break My Heart Again", by Whitesnake
- Don't Go Breaking My Heart (disambiguation)
