= Romeo's Daughter (album) =

Studio album by Romeo's Daughter
- Released: 1988
- Recorded: 1988
- Studio: Battery Studios, London
- Genre: Rock
- Length: 47:46
- Label: Jive; Rock Candy (reissue)
- Producer: Robert John "Mutt" Lange; John Parr

Romeo's Daughter chronology
Romeo's Daughter (1988)	Delectable (1993)

Singles from Romeo's Daughter
- 1. "Don't Break My Heart" Released: September 1988; 2. "I Cry Myself to Sleep at Night" Released: January 1989; 3. "Heaven in the Back Seat" Released: August 1989

Romeo's Daughter is the eponymous debut album from the UK hard rock band Romeo's Daughter. It was released in 1988 by Jive Records, and was produced by Robert John "Mutt" Lange and John Parr.

Despite critical acclaim and minor chart success for all three singles, Romeo's Daughter only reached no. 191 on the Billboard 200. Some of the album tracks were later recorded by artists including Eddie Money, Heart, Bonnie Tyler, Chrissy Steele and Steps.

== Background ==
Romeo's Daughter formed in 1985 and cut their first demos with John Parr. After signing to Jive Records, they began working with Parr and Robert John "Mutt" Lange on their debut album. The band met Parr through their manager, and when they began recording at Battery Studios in London, they met Lange who initially agreed to produce "Don't Break My Heart". Parr and Lange worked on three of the album's tracks together and produced the remaining tracks on their own.

== Release and promotion ==
"Don't Break My Heart" was released as the band's debut single in September 1988, supported by a music video. It reached no. 73 on the Billboard Hot 100 and no. 68 on the Cash Box Top 100 Singles chart. "I Cry Myself to Sleep at Night" followed as the album's second single in January 1989, and it peaked at no. 72 on the Cash Box Top 100 Singles chart. "Heaven in the Back Seat" followed as the album's third and final single in August 1989. It reached no. 97 in the United Kingdom in May 1990 following its use in the film A Nightmare on Elm Street 5: The Dream Child.

Romeo's Daughter was released in the United States in 1988, and a European release followed on 24 April 1989. In 1989, the band joined FM as the support act for their Tough It Out Tour in the UK.

The album was reissued by Rock Candy Records on 25 February 2008 with three live bonus tracks.

== Critical reception ==
Professional ratings
Review scores
Source	Rating
AllMusic	3/5 stars
Record-Journal	C+

Music & Media described Romeo's Daughter as a "first-rate pop album", describing Matty's voice as "raunchy" and "expressive", and noted the album's "powerful and impactful" compositions and production. Billboard described the songwriting on Romeo's Daughter as "machine-tooled pop" but complimented Lange and Parr's production, and Leigh Matty's vocal performance. In a review of the single "I Cry Myself to Sleep at Night", Billboard again complimented the production and compared the track's sound to that of the Motels. Cash Box described the band's sound as "muscular and very sexy", and noted the "provocative growl" in Matty's vocals. Cash Box described the title of "Don't Break My Heart" as clichéd, but noted it as a "breakneck track that keeps charging". In a review of the single "Heaven in the Back Seat", Oscar Wednesday of Cash Box described the lyrics as "truly poetic". In another positive review, Andrew Hirst of the Huddersfield Daily Examiner noted the "gutsy guitar strumming" and described it as "an excellent backdrop for Leigh Matty's passionate vocals". Conversely, Jim Zebora of Record-Journal opined that Romeo's Daughter were "more concerned with image than with the music", describing the music as "predictable" and that there is "nothing unusual about this band or its sound at all". Writing for the Nottingham Evening Post, John Holt described Lange's use of synthesizer on the album as "incessant" and suggested the album could have benefited from a more varied production. He named "Velvet Tongue" as the album's highlight for its "controlled agression with just the right amount of lip-gloss".

In a retrospective review for AllMusic, Sharon Mawer noted that despite the album's lack of commercial success, many of the songs were later covered by established artists.

== Track listing ==
No.	Title	Writer(s)	Producer	Length
1.	"Heaven in the Back Seat"	Robert John "Mutt" Lange; Craig Joiner	Lange	5:02
2.	"Don't Break My Heart"	Lange; Joiner	Lange; John Parr	4:14
3.	"I Cry Myself to Sleep at Night"	Lange; Joiner; Anthony Mitman	Lange	4:47
4.	"Wild Child"	Lange; Joiner; Mitman	Lange; Parr	4:41
5.	"Hymn (Look Through Golden Eyes)"	Lange; Joiner; Mitman; Leigh Matty	Lange	3:10
6.	"Velvet Tongue"	Lange	Lange	6:05
7.	"Stay with Me Tonight"	Lange; Joiner; Mitman; Matty	Lange; Parr	5:05
8.	"Inside Out"	Joiner; Mitman	Parr	6:00
9.	"I Like What I See"	Joiner	Parr	3:40
10.	"Colour You a Smile"	Joiner	Parr	5:02

== Credits and personnel ==
Adapted from album liner notes.

=== Musicians ===
- Leigh Matty – lead vocals
- Craig Joiner – guitars, vocals
- Tony Mitman – keys
- Robert John "Mutt" Lange – production (tracks 1–7)
- John Parr – production (tracks 2, 4, 7–10)

=== Technical ===
- Nigel Green – mixing
- Jerry Peal – engineering
- Anjali Dutt – engineering
- Chris Trevett – assistant engineering
- Geoff Hunt – assistant engineering

=== Design ===
- Peter Mountain – photography

== Charts ==
Chart (1988)	Peak position
US Billboard 200	191
