= Big House (album) =

Studio album by Big House
- Released: March 25, 1997
- Genre: Country
- Length: 46:54
- Label: MCA Nashville
- Producer: Peter Bunetta; Monty Byrom; David Neuhauser

Big House chronology
Big House (1997)	Travelin' Kind (1998)

Professional ratings
Review scores
Source	Rating
Allmusic	3/5 stars

Big House is the debut studio album by American country music band Big House. It was released on March 25, 1997 via MCA Nashville. The album includes the singles "Cold Outside," "You Ain't Lonely Yet" and "Love Ain't Easy."

== Track listing ==
No.	Title	Writer(s)	Length
1.	"You Ain't Lonely Yet"	Monty Byrom, David Neuhauser	3:46
2.	"Cold Outside"	Byrom, Dennis Knutson, Neuhauser, Max Reese	3:36
3.	"Amarillo"	Byrom, Scott Hutchison, Laura Satterfield	4:46
4.	"Love Ain't Easy"	Byrom, Pride Hutchison, S. Hutchison, Neuhauser	4:10
5.	"Walkin' on Me"	Chuck Seaton	4:47
6.	"Sunday in Memphis"	Byrom, S. Hutchison, Neuhauser	4:01
7.	"Blue Train"	Byrom, S. Hutchison, Neuhauser	3:37
8.	"Soul Country"	Byrom, Neuhauser	3:40
9.	"Cryin' Town"	Byrom, Neuhauser, Reese, Billy Walker	5:02
10.	"Whose Baby Will You Be Tonight"	Byrom, S. Hutchison, Neuhauser	3:19
11.	"Road Man"	Byrom, S. Hutchison, David Kaffinetti, Ira Walker	6:10

== Personnel ==
=== Big House ===
- Monty Byrom — lead vocals, acoustic guitar, electric guitar
- Tanner Byrom — drums, percussion, background vocals
- Sonny California — harmonica, percussion, background vocals
- Ron Mitchell — bass guitar, background vocals
- David Neuhauser — acoustic guitar, electric guitar, slide guitar, Hammond B-3 organ, background vocals
- Chuck Seaton — electric guitar, acoustic guitar, background vocals

=== Additional musicians ===
- Peter Bunetta — percussion
- Billy Russell — rhythm guitar on "Amarillo", "Cryin' Town", and "Sunday in Memphis"

== Chart performance ==
=== Album ===
Chart (1997)	Peak position
U.S. Billboard Top Country Albums	33
U.S. Billboard Top Heatseekers	21

=== Singles ===
Year	Single	Peak chart positions	
Year	Single	US Country	CAN Country
1997	"Cold Outside"	30	16
1997	"You Ain't Lonely Yet"	57	75
1997	"Love Ain't Easy"	71	—
"—" denotes releases that did not chart
