= Tommy Girvin =

- Instrument: Guitar

Tommy Girvin is a guitarist who is most famous for playing with Eddie Money, with whom he played since 1986.

Prior to Eddie Money, he played in a band from southern California called Smile, which reportedly had considerable success. Smile shared the stage with Van Halen, Quiet Riot and Mötley Crüe. He also holds the logo graphics credit for Heart's 1980 album Bebe le Strange.

He reportedly gave Warrant guitarist Joey Allen guitar lessons. He is given special thanks in the liner notes of the Warrant album Cherry Pie. It is implied, but not explicitly stated, that he may have played as an uncredited guest guitarist on the album.

Upon Eddie Money's passing, Tommy ran his company, Mr. Tommy Presents. He provided musical instruction programs for children in the Tampa area.

== Discography ==
=== With Eddie Money ===
- Nothing to Lose (1988)
- Right Here (1991)
- Unplug It In (1992)
- Shakin' with the Money Man (1997)
- Ready Eddie (1999)

=== With Fiona ===
- Squeeze (1992)

=== With Terence Trent D'Arby ===
- Terence Trent D'Arby's Symphony or Damn* (*Exploring the Tension Inside the Sweetness) (1993)

=== With Wendy & Carnie Wilson ===
- Hey Santa! (1993)

=== With Smile ===
- Smile (1984)

=== With Burning Candles ===
- Burning Candles (2000)

=== With Ransom ===
- Trouble in Paradise (1997)
- Better Days (2010)

=== Solo ===
- The Bulldozer Sessions Vol. 1 (2009)
- Goodnight, Goodnight (projected 2009 or 2010)
- Christmas Time Is Here Again (2009)
