= Breaking My Heart =

Breaking My Heart may refer to:

- "Breaking My Heart" (The Peppermints song)
- Breaking My Heart (Reiley song), 2023
- "Breaking My Heart", a single by Tony Di Bart
- "Breaking My Heart", a single by Roni Griffith, 1983
- "Breaking My Heart", a song by Gerald Levert from the album Love & Consequences
- "Breaking My Heart", a song by Michael Learns to Rock from Nothing to Lose
- "Breaking My Heart", a song by OMC from the album How Bizarre
- "Breaking My Heart", a song by Al Epp and The Pharaohs, 1959
- "Breaking My Heart", a song by Warren Williams, 1966

== See also ==
- Don't Go Breaking My Heart (disambiguation)
