= She Takes My Breath Away =

Single by Eddie Money

from the album Right Here
- Released: 1992
- Length: 4:19
- Label: Columbia
- Songwriter(s): Eddie Money; Gary Bromham; Dennis Morgan; Monty Byrom; Marc Tanner
- Producer(s): Marc Tanner; Eddie Money; Randy D. Jackson

Eddie Money singles chronology
"I'll Get By" (1991)	"She Takes My Breath Away" (1992)	"Fall in Love Again" (1992)

"She Takes My Breath Away" is a song by American singer Eddie Money, released in 1992 as the third single from his eighth studio album Right Here. It was written by Money, Gary Bromham, Dennis Morgan, Monty Byrom and Marc Tanner, and produced by Tanner and Money, with additional production by Randy D. Jackson. "She Takes My Breath Away" reached No. 5 on the US Billboard Album Rock Tracks and remained in the charts for 12 weeks.

"She Takes My Breath Away" was inspired by Money's wife. Money told The Noblesville Ledger in 1992: "She has a great body; she is gorgeous. She has three kids and one on the way for me. She takes my breath away and I think people can relate to [that] song." The song was featured in the 1992 American action comedy film Kuffs.

== Reception ==
In a review of Right Here, Dana Tofig of the Hartford Courant commented: "The only relief from the boredom of this disc is "She Takes My Breath Away," an up-tempo danceable number, which features an infectious rhythm-guitar groove that sticks in your head. And, yes, it's fun." Mark Lepage of The Gazette described the song as having "the industrial-strength choruses that deserve to be all over CHOM-FM."

== Track listing ==
CD single (US promo)

1. "She Takes My Breath Away" - 4:19

== Charts ==
Chart (1992)	Peak position
US Billboard Album Rock Tracks	5
