= I'll Get By (song) =

Single by Eddie Money

from the album Right Here
- B-side: "Think Twice"
- Released: 1991
- Length: 3:31
- Label: Columbia
- Songwriters: Antonina Armato; Andy Hill; Eddie Money
- Producers: Keith Olsen; Eddie Money; Randy D. Jackson

Eddie Money singles chronology
"Heaven in the Backseat" (1991)	"I'll Get By" (1991)	"She Takes My Breath Away" (1992)

Music video
- "I'll Get By" on YouTube

"I'll Get By" is a song by American singer Eddie Money, released in 1991, by Columbia Records, as the second single from his eighth studio album, Right Here (1991). It was written by Antonina Armato, Andy Hill and Money, and produced by Keith Olsen and Money, with additional production by Randy D. Jackson. "I'll Get By" reached No. 6 on the US Cash Box Top 100 and No. 21 on the US Billboard Hot 100. It was Money's last Top-40 single on the chart. The song's music video was dedicated to Bill Graham.

== Reception ==
Upon its release, Larry Flick of Billboard magazine wrote, "Money has a good shot at reviving top 40 interest thanks to this mournful pop/rock ballad. His well-worn voice provides a wordly, affecting edge." In a review of Right Here, Joe Konz of The Indianapolis Star wrote: "The album's nominal slow song, 'I'll Get By', could almost be characterized as tender. Almost. 'I'll Get By' is probably as good as [Money] gets when he's out of his league." Dana Tofig of the Hartford Courant considered the song "an acceptable but predictable ballad".

== Track listing ==
- Cassette single
1. "I'll Get By" - 2:56
2. "Think Twice" - 3:55
- CD single (US promo)
1. "I'll Get By" - 3:31

== Charts ==
=== Weekly charts ===
Chart (1991–92)	Peak position
Australia (ARIA)	168
Canada Top Singles (RPM)	15
US Billboard Hot 100	21
US Adult Contemporary (Billboard)	7
US Cash Box Top 100	6

=== Year-end charts ===
Chart (1992)	Position
US Cash Box Top 100	49
