= Attracted to the Animal =

Single by Romeo's Daughter

from the album Delectable
- Released: 1993
- Genre: Album-oriented rock
- Length: 3:30
- Label: Music For Nations Records
- Songwriter(s): Craig Joiner; Andrew Wells
- Producer(s): Romeo's Daughter; Andy Reilly

Romeo's Daughter singles chronology
"Heaven in the Back Seat" (1988)	"Attracted to the Animal" (1993)	"Bittersweet" (2012)

Licensed audio
- "Attracted to the Animal" on YouTube

"Attracted to the Animal" is a single by British AOR band Romeo's Daughter, released in 1993. Taken from the band's second album, Delectable, it was their final release until Rapture (2012).

The single was released in the UK only and included two additional tracks "Sugar Daddy" and "Talk Dirty to Me". The latter track was not included on the album and remained exclusive to the single.

A music video was released to promote the single.

== Track listing ==
1. "Attracted to the Animal" 3:30
2. "Sugar Daddy" - 2:26 - (Joiner/Matty)
3. "Talk Dirty to Me" - 3:12 -(Joiner/Matty/Mitman)

== Personnel ==
- Leigh Matty - lead and backing vocals
- Craig Joiner - guitars, backing vocals
- Anthony Mitman - keyboards, backing vocals
- Ed Poole - bass
- Andy Wells - drums, backing vocals
- Producer - Romeo's Daughter, Andy Reilly
- Mixing - Steve Brown, Owen Davies
- Assistance - Steve Musters, Ian Wilkinson

== Charts ==
Chart (1993)	Peak position
UK Singles Chart (Gallup)	115
