= Don't Go Breaking My Heart (disambiguation) =

"Don't Go Breaking My Heart" is a 1976 duet by Elton John and Kiki Dee.

Don't Go Breaking My Heart may also refer to:

== Film and television ==
- Don't Go Breaking My Heart (1999 film), a British film
- Don't Go Breaking My Heart (2011 film), a Hong Kong-Chinese romantic comedy film
- "Don't Go Breaking My Heart" (Frasier), a television episode
- "Don't Go Breaking My Heart" (Young Rock), a television episode

== Music ==
- "Don't Go Breaking My Heart" (Agnes song), 2011
- "Don't Go Breaking My Heart" (Backstreet Boys song), 2018
- "Don't Go Breaking My Heart" (Sonic Dream Collective song), 1995
- "Don't Go Breaking My Heart", a song by Dionne Warwick from Here I Am, 1965
- "Don't Go Breaking My Heart", a 1994 Elton John re-release with Ru-Paul
- "Don't Go Breaking My Heart", a song by Atomic Kitten from Ladies Night, 2003
- "Don't Go Breaking My Heart", a song by Herb Alpert and the Tijuana Brass from S.R.O., 1966

== See also ==
- Breaking My Heart (disambiguation)
- Don't Break My Heart (disambiguation)
