= Delectable =

Studio album by Romeo's Daughter
- Released: 30 September 1993
- Recorded: 1993
- Studios: Ezee Studios, London
- Genre: Rock
- Length: 42:18
- Label: Music for Nations
- Producers: Romeo's Daughter; Andy Reilly

Romeo's Daughter chronology
Romeo's Daughter (1988)	Delectable (1993)	Rapture (2012)

Delectable is the second album by AOR band Romeo's Daughter. It was released on 30 September 1993 by Music for Nations. The band co-produced the album with Andy Reilly.

"Attracted to the Animal" was released as the album's only single. Romeo's Daughter broke up shortly after Delectable was released. They reformed in 2009 after Rock Candy reissued Delectable and their debut album.

== Background ==
Romeo's Daughter recorded their debut album with producers Mutt Lange and John Parr under Jive Records. Romeo's Daughter was not a commercial success, but received critical acclaim and some of the tracks went on to be covered by established artists. The band delayed working on their second album as they hoped to work with Lange again, but he was busy collaborating with Bryan Adams on his album Waking Up the Neighbours. Romeo's Daughter subsequently left Jive for Music for Nations and self-produced Delectable with Andy Reilly.

== Release and promotion ==
"Attracted to the Animal" was released as the album's only single, featuring two bonus tracks "Sugar Daddy" and "Talk Dirty to Me". Delectable was released on 30 September 1993.

== Critical reception ==
Professional ratings
Review scores
Source	Rating
Kerrang!	4/5 stars

Steve Beebee of Kerrang! described Delectable as a "well executed" album that "betters [its predecessor] in every possible way".

== Track listing ==
No.	Title	Writer(s)	Length
1.	"Have Mercy"	Craig Joiner; Andy Wells	3:46
2.	"Attracted to the Animal"	Joiner; Wells	3:30
3.	"Nobody Like You"	Merv Goldsworthy; Joiner; Leigh Matty	5:27
4.	"Nothing but Love"	Joiner	3:53
5.	"God Only Knows"	Joiner	5:36
6.	"Ready or Not"	Joiner; Wells	4:30
7.	"Treat Me Like a Lady"	Joiner	3:49
8.	"Sugar Daddy"	Joiner; Matty	2:26
9.	"Dream in Colour"	Joiner	3:53
10.	"Dancing Slow"	Joiner; Wells	5:28

== Credits and personnel ==
Adapted from album liner notes.

=== Musicians ===
- Romeo's Daughter – production
- Andy Reilly – production
- Leigh Matty – lead vocals
- Craig Joiner – guitars, backing vocals
- Tony Mitman – keys
- Andy Wells – drums, backing vocals
- Merv Goldsworthy – bass

=== Technical ===
- Steve Brown – mixing
- Owen Davies – mixing
- Steve Musters – assistant mixing
- Jon Wilkinson – assistant mixing
- Gordon Vicary – mastering

=== Design ===
- Peter Mountain – photography
- Mez Meredith – concept and design
