= Fall in Love Again (Eddie Money song) =

Single by Eddie Money

from the album Right Here
- Released: 1992
- Length: 4:25
- Label: Columbia
- Songwriters: Monty Byrom; Eddie Money; Jeff Kossack
- Producers: Monty Byrom; Randy D. Jackson; Eddie Money

Eddie Money singles chronology
| "She Takes My Breath Away" (1992) | "Fall in Love Again" (1992) | "Save a Little Room in Your Heart for Me" (1993) |

"Fall in Love Again" is a song by American singer Eddie Money, released in 1992 by Columbia Records as the fourth and final single from his eighth studio album, Right Here (1991). It was written by Monty Byrom, Money and Jeff Kossack, and produced by Byrom, Randy D. Jackson and Money. "Fall in Love Again" reached No. 54 on the US Billboard Hot 100 and remained in the charts for 11 weeks. It also peaked at No. 47 on the US Cash Box Top 100. A music video was filmed to promote the single.

Speaking of the song, Money told The Pantagraph in 1992: "[It's] a beautiful, beautiful ballad - and it says something about the ecology. But I don't like to spend an entire song or album, like Sting, trying to save the rain forests. I'm into it, but I've already fought my battles back in the '60s and '70s."

== Reception ==
Upon release, Larry Flick of Billboard magazine described the song as "a guitar-framed power ballad". He added: "[Money's] well-worn voice adds a distinctive and familiar flavor to an otherwise formulaic tune". Dave Sholin of the Gavin Report commented: "[Money's] raw emotion goes hand-in-hand with this tender melody boosted even more thanks to an awesome acoustic version". In a review of Right Here, Chuck Eddy of LA Weekly considered the song a "bombastic beaut of a starting-over croon".

== Track listing ==
1. "Fall in Love Again" - 4:25
2. "Fall in Love Again" (Acoustic version) - 4:15

== Charts ==
| Chart (1992) | Peak position |
|---|---|
| Canada Top Singles (RPM) | 52 |
| US Billboard Hot 100 | 54 |
| US Adult Contemporary (Billboard) | 16 |
| US Cash Box Top 100 | 47 |
