= Big House (Moccasin, Arizona) =

Historic house in Arizona, United States

- U.S. National Register of Historic Places
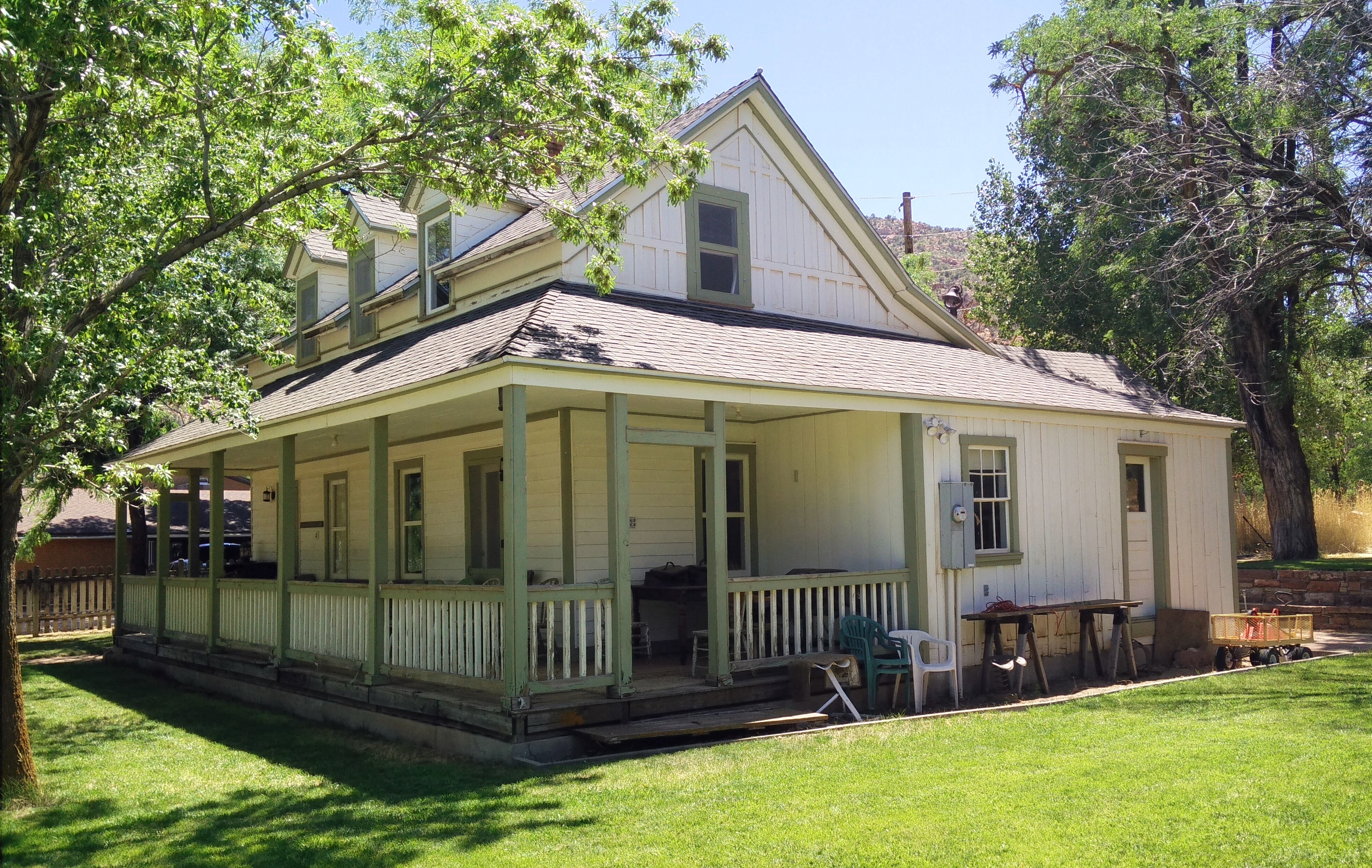
- The Big House in 2016

- Location within Arizona Location within the United States
- Location: W. Center St., Moccasin, Arizona
- Coordinates: 36°54′34″N 112°45′38″W
- Area: 1.3 acres (0.53 ha)
- Built: 1875
- Built by: Dellie Webb, Heber Ayers
- Architect: Dellie Webb, Heber Ayers
- Architectural style: Vernacular Saltbox
- NRHP reference No.: 83003497
- Added to NRHP: October 20, 1983

The Big House in Moccasin, Arizona was built c. 1875 by Mormon pioneer craftsmen associated with the Mormon United Order based in Orderville, Utah. The house was one of the first multi-room residences in the remote northern Arizona community of Moccasin and for several decades served as a community and religious center for Moccasin and Arizona Strip residents and visitors. Many travelers on the Mormon Honeymoon Trail stayed in the Big House.

== History ==
In the late 1800s, LDS Church leaders organized settlement in southern Utah and Northern Arizona. One settlement on the Arizona Strip, Pipe Spring, was settled in 1870. At about the same time, the community of Moccasin was established at Moccasin Spring, about four miles north of Pipe Spring. Both communities were located on the Mormon Honeymoon Trail, so-called because it linked communities in the Little Colorado region with St. George, Utah, location of the first LDS Temple completed in Utah.

The Big House was built in about 1875 by Dellie Webb and Heber Ayers, carpenters and craftsmen associated with the Orderville United Order. The new house was called the "Big House" because other Moccasin residences at the time were generally one-room cabins. The house was built for John Covington and his family, who were given "stewardship" of the Moccasin property and were designated caretakers of it for the Orderville United Order. In 1883, Christopher Beilby Heaton (1852–1895) replaced Covington as caretaker of the Big House and other Moccasin property.

Heaton was assigned to operate the ranch and designated as LDS "missionary to the Indians" in the area. The Kaibab Band of the Southern Paiute Indians had lived on and controlled the Arizona Strip area, including the area around Pipe Spring, Moccasin Spring, and nearby Sand Spring, since approx. 1150 A.D. Today the Big House and the community of Moccasin comprise a small area of non-reservation land within the larger Kaibab Indian Reservation

Starting in the 1880s, the Orderville United Order gradually transferred or sold its holdings to shareholders. The Big House and other Moccasin properties were transferred to the Heaton family. After Christopher Heaton moved to the Mormon colonies in Mexico, ownership was transferred to Heaton's brothers Jonathan, Alvin, Fred, and Will Heaton. By 1894, trading and exchanges among the brothers for properties inherited from the Orderville United Order had established Jonathan Heaton as owner of the Big House. Jonathan and Lucy Heaton raised a family of eleven children in the Big House.

== Moccasin Ranch Activities & Significance ==
Emma Carroll Seegmiller, sister of Lucy Heaton, outlined activities at the Moccasin Ranch in the late 1800s:

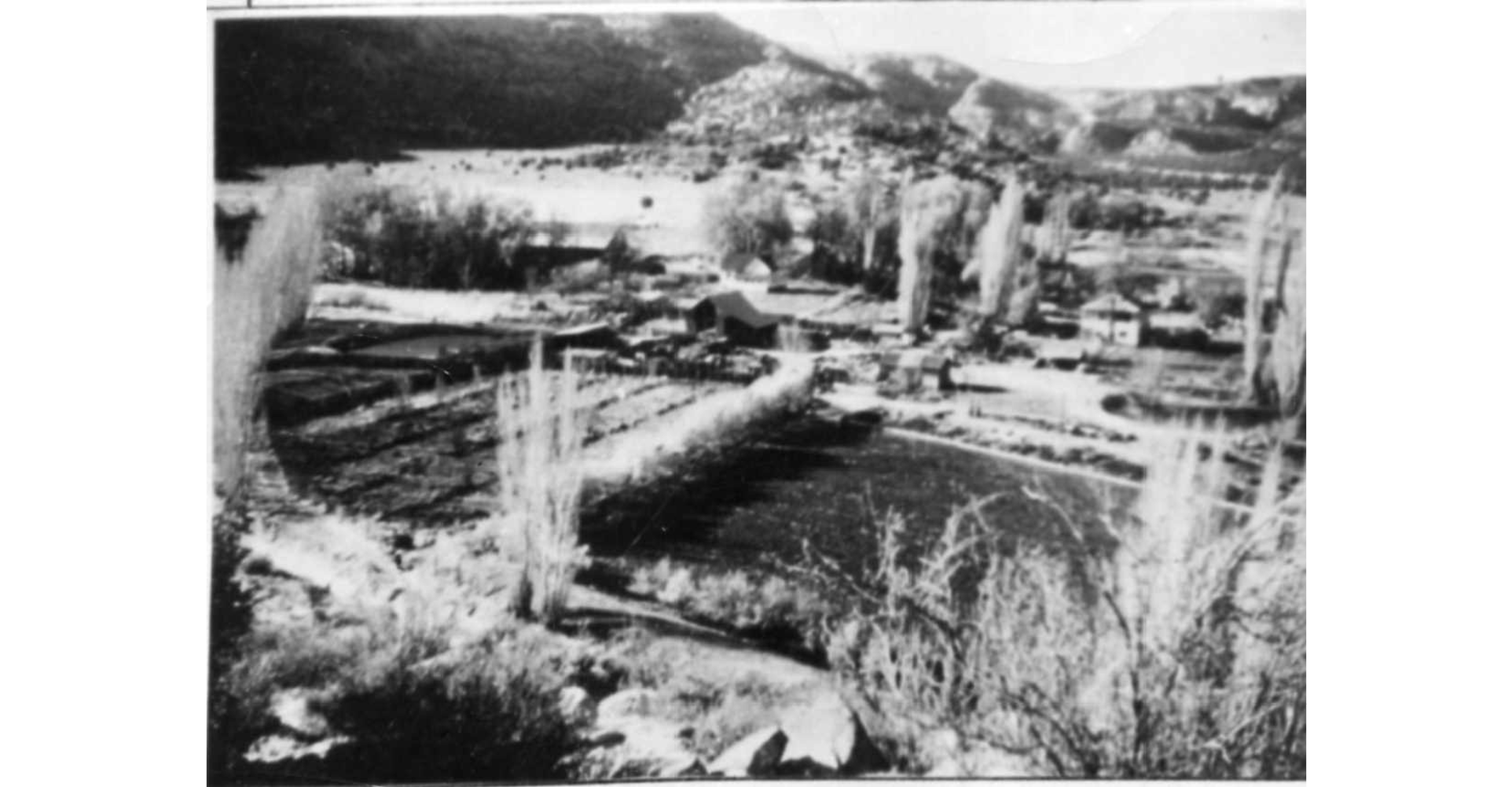
Heaton Ranch in Moccasin, AZ, at the base of the Vermilion Cliffs, in winter. The photo shows the Big House (upper center right, in grove of trees), the schoolhouse dating 1904 (across the road from the Big House and nearer the camera than the Big House; white with a dark roof), and a residence occupied by Charles and Margaret Heaton, Jonathan and Lucy Heaton's eldest son and his wife (multistory residence to the center right of the photo; white with a dark roof), as well as several outbuildings. Moccasin Spring is in the open area to the upper left. (Photo ca. 1906)

[T]here were fruits in abundance—peaches, grapes, plums, melons galore . . . abundant fields of sugar cane were raised from which the molasses for which the Order was famous, was made and which for a time constituted our sole source of sweetening for foods. . . . In the Autumn girls and boys were ushered into service picking up potatoes and topping beets and carrots. . . . The beets and carrots were dumped in piles, around which we sat and as at a husking bee, we sang and talked while we worked. . . . Farming and the care of stock were successful enterprises of Moccasin Ranch.

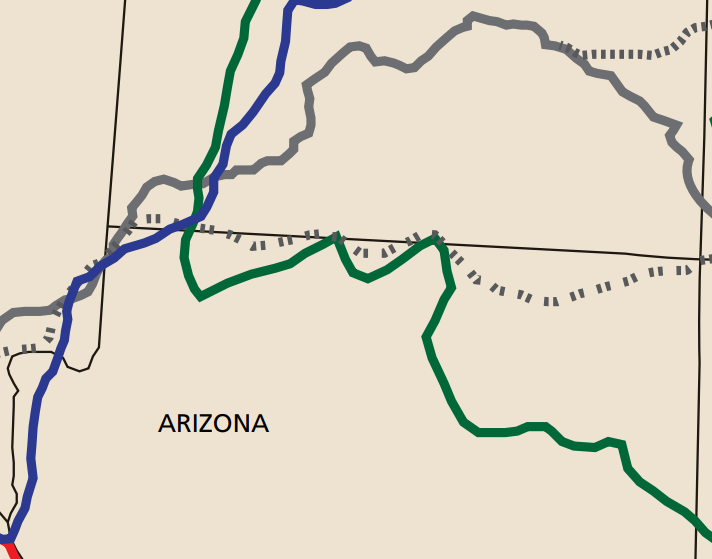
Old Spanish Trail early exploration routes in southern Utah and northern Arizona. Green=Dominguez-Escalante, 1776–1777. Blue=Jedediah Smith, 1826–1827. Double-Dashed=Armijo Route, 1829. Brown=Northern Route, 1831. Dashed=North Branch, 1848.

The route along the Vermilion Cliffs through the Arizona Strip, passing by Pipe Spring and Moccasin Spring, had long been used by Native Americans. It became part of the Armijo Route of the Old Spanish Trail, connecting Santa Fe and Los Angeles, after it was explored by Antonio Armijo in 1829–1830. After Mormon settlement in the area, this route became known as the Honeymoon Trail, connecting Mormon settlements in southern Utah and northern Arizona to St. George.

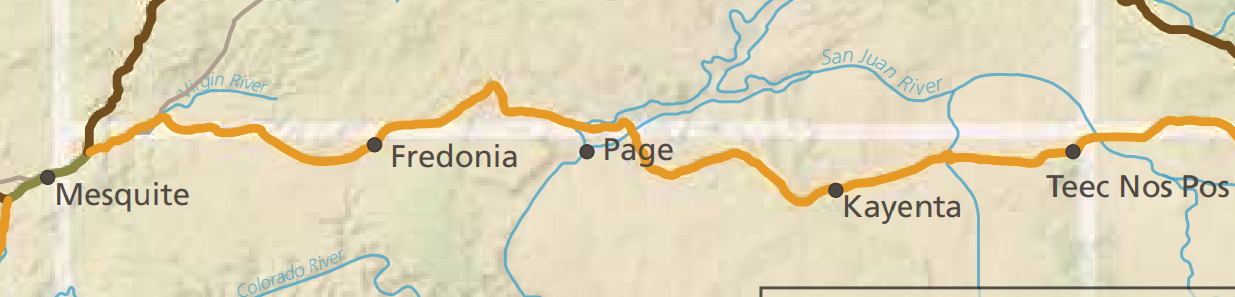
Old Spanish Trail - Armijo Route through southern Utah and northern Arizona, National Park Service. Orange=Armijo Route. Brown=Northern Route. Olive=Mojave Road

The Big House was an important stop on the Honeymoon Trail, where many guests and visitors spent the night. One month, the Heatons tallied 110 meals served to guests and 35 horses fed. Guests included "governors, church leaders, businessmen, important park and railroad officials, cowboys, herders, and Indians."

In addition, the Big House served as the location of school classes, community meetings, and religious services for many years, until construction of a community school in Moccasin in 1904.

== National Register of Historic Places ==
The Big House was listed on the National Register of Historic Places in 1983. The listing included two contributing buildings, the Big House itself and a Granary located near the house and built about 1880.

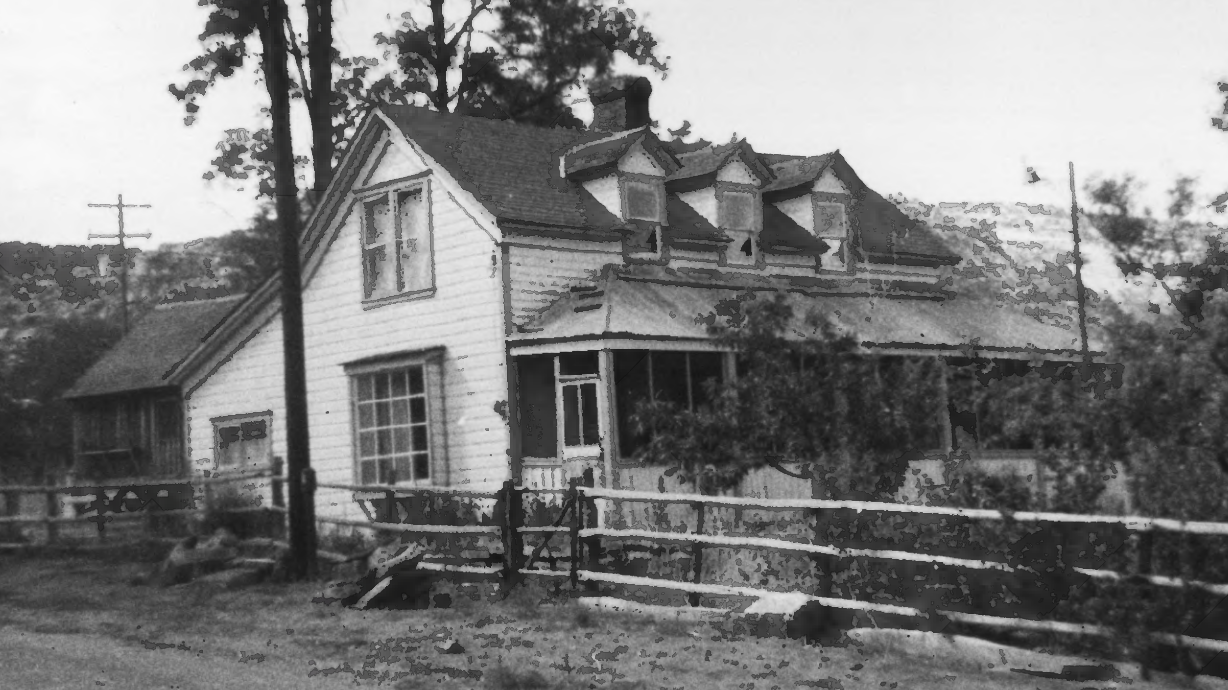
The Big House and Granary, 1875, Moccasin, Arizona. National Register of Historic Places. (1980 photo)
