= Open Sesame (Whodini album) =

Studio album by Whodini
- Released: 1987
- Studio: Battery (London); Greene St. (New York)
- Genre: Hip-hop
- Length: 53:32
- Label: Jive
- Producer: Larry Smith; Whodini; Sinister

Whodini chronology
| Back In Black (1986) | Open Sesame (1987) | Bag-A-Trix (1991) |

Singles from Open Sesame
- 1. "Be Yourself" Released: 1987

Professional ratings
Review scores
| Source | Rating |
|---|---|
| Allmusic | 2/5 stars |

Open Sesame is the fourth studio album by American hip hop group Whodini. It was released in 1987 via Jive Records, the final album of new material the group would release on the label before moving to MCA Records. The album was produced by Larry Smith, except for two tracks produced by Sinister and Whodini. The record peaked at No. 30 on the Billboard 200, at No. 8 on the Top R&B/Hip-Hop Albums, and was certified gold by the Recording Industry Association of America on January 20, 1988.

A single, "Be Yourself", featuring Millie Jackson, peaked at No. 20 on the Hot R&B/Hip-Hop Songs.

== Track listing ==
| No. | Title | Producer(s) | Length |
|---|---|---|---|
| 1. | "Rock You Again (Again and Again)" | Larry Smith | 5:29 |
| 2. | "Be Yourself" (featuring Millie Jackson) | Whodini; Sinister | 3:25 |
| 3. | "Cash Money" | Larry Smith | 5:08 |
| 4. | "Hooked on You" | Larry Smith | 5:34 |
| 5. | "Early Mother's Day Card" | Larry Smith | 4:00 |
| 6. | "Now That Whodini's Inside the Joint" | Larry Smith | 5:09 |
| 7. | "Life Is Like a Dance" | Larry Smith | 4:01 |
| 8. | "You Brought it on Yourself" | Larry Smith | 3:57 |
| 9. | "I'm Def (Jump Back and Kiss Myself)" | Whodini; Sinister | 5:24 |
| 10. | "Remember Where You Came From" | Larry Smith | 3:44 |
| 11. | "For the Body" | Larry Smith | 2:32 |
| 12. | "You Take My Breath Away" | Larry Smith | 5:09 |
| Total length: | | | 53:32 |

Samples

- Track 1 contains elements from "Long Red" by Mountain (1972)
- Track 2 contains elements from "Impeach the President" by the Honey Drippers (1973), "The Payback" by James Brown (1973), "Get Up, Get Into It, Get Involved" by James Brown (1970), "Say What?" by Trouble Funk (1983)
- Track 7 contains elements from "Dance to the Drummer's Beat" by Herman Kelly & Life (1978)

== Personnel ==
- Jalil Hutchins – performer, producer (tracks: 2, 9)
- John "Ecstacy" Fletcher – performer, producer (tracks: 2, 9)
- Mildred Jackson – performer (track 2)
- Lawrence Michael Smith – producer (tracks: 1, 3–8, 10–12)
- Sinister – producer (tracks: 2, 9)
- Roy Cormier – co-producer (tracks: 2, 9)
- Bryan "Chuck" New – mixing (tracks: 1, 3–8, 10–12)
- Rod Hui – mixing (tracks: 2, 9)
- Douglas Rowell – photography
- Maude Gilman – art direction

== Certifications ==
| Region | Certification | Certified units/sales |
|---|---|---|
| United States (RIAA) | Gold | 500,000^{^} |
^{^} Shipments figures based on certification alone.
