= Back in Black (Whodini album) =

Studio album by Whodini
- Released: April 29, 1986
- Recorded: 1985–1986
- Studio: Battery (London)
- Genre: Hip hop, rap rock
- Length: 55:06
- Label: Jive
- Producer: Larry Smith

Whodini chronology
Escape (1984)	Back in Black (1986)	Open Sesame (1987)

Singles from Back in Black
- 1. "Funky Beat" Released: 1986; 2. "One Love" Released: 1986; 3. "Growing Up" Released: 1986

Professional ratings
Review scores
Source	Rating
AllMusic	3/5 stars
Spin	favorable

Back in Black is the third album by American hip hop group Whodini. It was recorded in London and released via Jive Records in 1986. Like on the group's previous work, audio production was handled by Larry Smith. The album peaked at #35 on the Billboard 200, #4 on the Top R&B/Hip-Hop Albums, and was certified gold by Recording Industry Association of America on June 23, 1986.

The record spawned three singles: "Funky Beat" (peaked at #19 on the Hot R&B/Hip-Hop Songs and #30 on the Dance Club Songs), "One Love" (peaked at #10 on the Hot R&B/Hip-Hop Songs and #34 on the Dance Club Songs), and "Growing Up" (peaked at #58 on the Hot R&B/Hip-Hop Songs).

The music video for "Funky Beat" featured appearances by Malcolm-Jamal Warner, who was a cast member of The Cosby Show at the time, as well as Run D.M.C., Bobby Brown, Kurtis Blow, Donnie Simpson, Bow-Legged Lou of Full Force and Floyd Vivino with his puppet Oogie from The Uncle Floyd Show. The music video for the third single "Growing Up" was notable by the appearances of actors Giancarlo Esposito, Laurence Fishburne and Carl Anthony Payne II.

== Track listing ==
No.	Title	Writer(s)	Length
1.	"Funky Beat"	J. Hutchins; J. Fletcher; D. Carter; L. Smith	5:01
2.	"One Love"	J. Hutchins; L. Smith	5:32
3.	"Growing Up"	J. Hutchins; L. Smith	5:10
4.	"I'm A Ho"	J. Hutchins; J. Fletcher; L. Smith	4:06
5.	"How Dare You"	J. Hutchins; L. Smith; P. Harris	6:48
6.	"Fugitive"	J. Hutchins; J. Fletcher; L. Smith	6:12
7.	"Echo Scratch"	J. Hutchins; J. Fletcher; L. Smith	5:21
8.	"Last Night (I Had A Long Talk With Myself)"	J. Hutchins; B. New	5:30
9.	"The Good Part"	J. Hutchins; L. Smith	4:09

Back In Black — CD bonus track
No.	Title	Length
10.	"Whodini Mega Mix"	7:17
Total length:		55:06

Note

- Track 5 contains samples from "Piano Sonata, Op. 35, No. 2 in B-flat Minor" by Frédéric Chopin (1839)

== Personnel ==
- Jalil Hutchins - performer
- John "Ecstacy" Fletcher - performer
- Lawrence Smith - backing vocals, producer, bass, keyboard programming
- Ron Gray - backing vocals (track 2)
- Bryan Chuck New - mixing, engineer
- Peter Brian Harris - fairlight programming
- Jerry Peal - engineer
- Peter Woolliscroft - engineer
- George Young - solo guitar (track 6)
- Paul Kodish - drums
- Barry Eastmond - keyboards (track 9)
- Doug Rowell - photography

== Charts ==
=== Weekly charts ===
Chart (1986)	Peak position
US Billboard 200	35
US Top R&B/Hip-Hop Albums (Billboard)	4

=== Year-end charts ===
Chart (1986)	Position
US Billboard 200	88
US Top R&B/Hip-Hop Albums (Billboard)	16

== Certifications ==
Region	Certification	Certified units/sales
United States (RIAA)	Gold	500,000^{^}
^{^} Shipments figures based on certification alone.
