= Escape (Whodini album) =

Studio album by Whodini
- Released: October 17, 1984
- Studio: Battery Studios (London)
- Genre: Hip-hop
- Length: 38:31
- Label: Jive
- Producer: Larry Smith

Whodini chronology
| Whodini (1983) | Escape (1984) | Back in Black (1986) |

Singles from Escape
- 1. "Friends" Released: July 20, 1984; 2. "Freaks Come Out at Night"; 3. "Big Mouth"; 4. "Escape (I Need a Break)"

Escape is the second studio album by American hip-hop group Whodini, released on October 17, 1984, by Jive Records. The album was recorded at Battery Studios in London, where the group worked with record producer Larry Smith after their management could not find them a producer. Whodini member Jalil Hutchins convinced Smith, his friend, to produce the album when Smith needed money after a friend's hospitalisation. Although the group originally intended to record more rock-oriented material for the album, its music has a predominantly synthesizer-based backing, with a contemporary R&B influence.

The album was a critical success upon release, and was praised by NME and Robert Christgau. It was also commercially successful, being the first hip-hop album to chart within the U.S. top 40, and was also one of the first to be certified platinum by the RIAA.

== Production ==
After working on their debut self-titled studio album, Whodini embarked on a three-month European tour. Two and a half weeks into this tour, they were joined by Kangol Kid and UTFO. The group had also planned to tour in Israel and Australia following their European tour, but refused to do so, as they had been away from home for three weeks and found the tour "rigorous". Singer-songwriter Jalil Hutchins later said, "Somebody should've stepped in and made us [continue the tour]." Whodini member John Fletcher (Ecstasy) said that the group thought European audiences would be unfamiliar with their music, but they "found that lots of kids, lots of club owners, had made a real effort to get hold of our music. When we discovered that, we realized that the music we were working with really was universal, that we didn't have to think of a particular market. People everywhere like to dance, sweat and party, and they like the same kind of sounds."

The group worked well with German record producer Conny Plank on Whodini, and were trying to find a similar producer. According to Hutchins, "Conny had an understanding of what hip hop was, and if we had an understanding of how to explain it to these musicians who were far ahead of us, we would've produced some special records. On the next album, we decided that we needed to get somebody from [the US] that understood where we were coming from." Although Jive Records initially hired Russell Simmons and Larry Smith to produce Escape, commitments in New York kept Simmons from recording sessions. Hutchins had met Smith at the dance club Disco Fever in New York City; although they were friends and often discussed music, he said that they did not originally consider working together. Jive Records could not find a producer, and Hutchins asked Smith to come to Europe and produce the album. The producer initially refused for financial reasons, but called Hutchins the following day saying that he needed money to pay a hospital bill for a friend who had his finger tips ripped off. Smith and Hutchins then quickly met to develop music to show to the label, recording the bass for "Five Minutes of Funk".

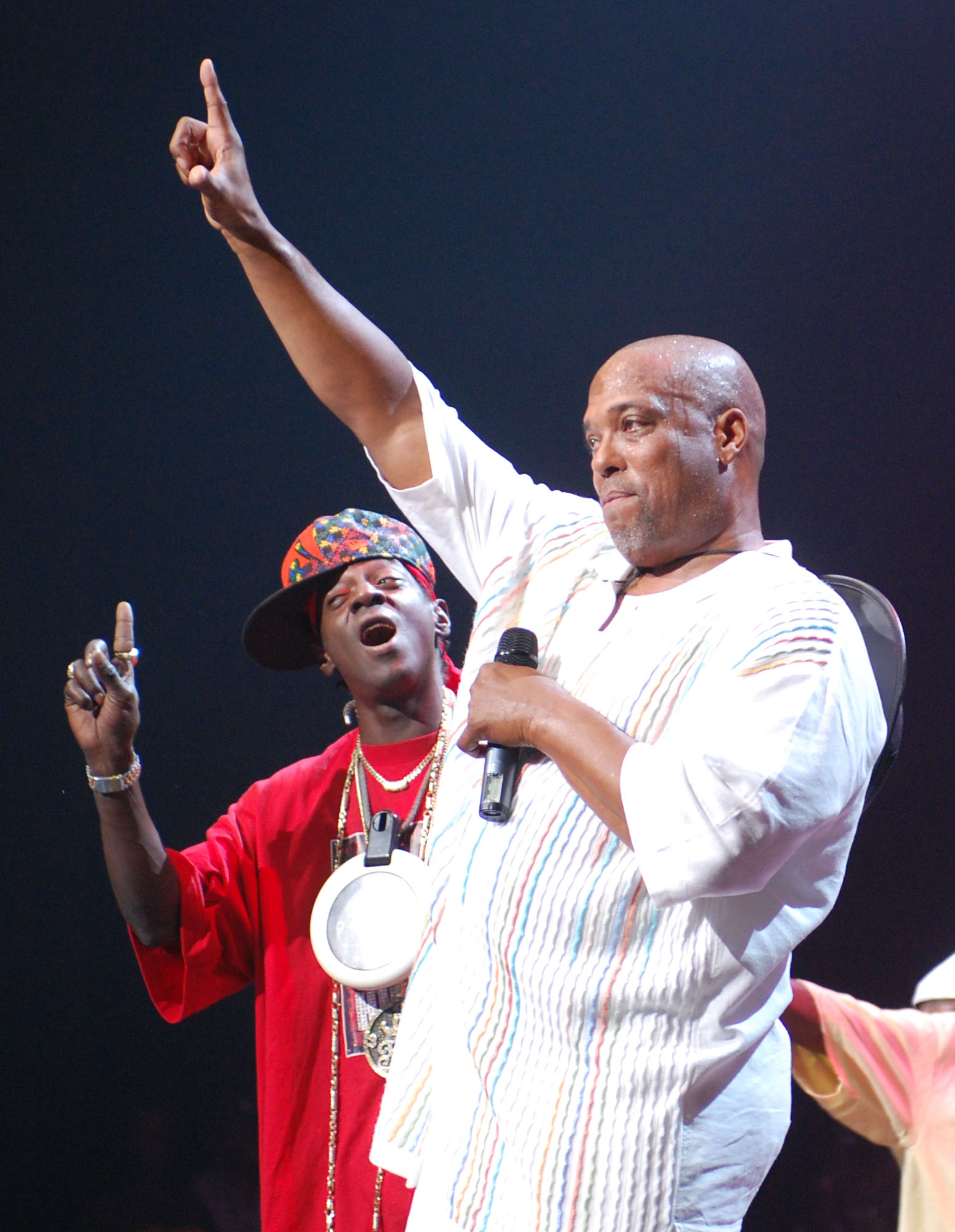
Ecstasy and Flavor Flav in 2009; Ecstasy was pleasantly surprised by Whodini's overseas popularity after the release of their first album.

Escape was recorded in 16 days at Battery Studios in London, with Hutchins often writing lyrics in the studio. He found it difficult to write a complete song at home, and finished the lyrics later. Hutchins worked well with Smith, and said that the producer became involved in the music-making and "would start talking a lot of shit to us to let us feel like he felt". Smith's presence is evident on "Friends", whose beat was (according to Hutchins) "nothing like the way it sounded after he got to it". Whodini often argued with the studio personnel; Hutchins said that he "never seen studio sessions like ours. Criticism would be flying around that studio like skyrockets and bullets ... But we knew we got something right when Larry started grabbing his dick, and that was the craziest thing in the world." Smith encouraged Whodini to use a variety of instruments on each track, from the Linn LM-1 and Roland TR-707 drum machines to a Fender Jazz Bass.

== Music ==
The music on Escape, in particular "Five Minutes of Funk", was originally intended to be rock-oriented, with Hutchins suggesting that the song would be similar to the "rawer" work of groups such as the Isley Brothers. Whodini had planned to use a Minimoog synthesizer on the track, although Smith left his at home, assuming that he could find one in the United Kingdom. Unable to locate one, the group then heard Run-DMC's "Rock Box" and decided to follow a more R&B-oriented direction. Smith said that although he was told by Jive Records to make the album sound like Run-DMC, he "didn't want to do exactly that. Whodini's a bit more adult, I think, and rap's not just for kids anymore."

The record has been called "rhythm & blues-based rap", and has been cited as a major influence on new jack swing—a hip-hop-influenced form of funk which became the dominant form of contemporary R&B from 1987 to 1993. Nelson George described Escape's music as a style which "black radio embraces", specifically a "radio-friendly, singles-oriented hip hop", as opposed to the "hard-core, more rhyme-centered rap". Retrospective commentary on their music suggested that, although the group sounded tame when compared to the later work of artists such as Too Short and Ol' Dirty Bastard, as well as groups like the 2 Live Crew, Whodini were not shy to have a more measured sense of lyrical sexuality during the mid-1980s on songs such as "Freaks Come Out at Night".

Unlike other hip-hop musicians, Whodini's backing music and beats were synthesizer-based. Escape contains tracks with minimal musical backing, such as "Big Mouth" and "Friends", and faster-paced music such as "Escape (I Need a Break)". Hutchins believed that the Fender Jazz Bass was part of Whodini's signature sound, and used it on "Five Minutes of Funk". Escape's lyrics are generally egocentric, but also explored the difficulty of city life ("Escape (I Need a Break)"), failed romance ("Friends") and New York's party lifestyle ("Freaks Come Out at Night").

== Release ==
The album was released on October 17, 1984, by Jive Records. The group had a developed a large following in Britain and Europe prior to the release of Escape, although success in the United States had initially been limited. "Five Minutes of Funk" and "Freaks Come Out at Night" became their first legitimate hits in their home country. According to The New York Times, these could be "heard almost constantly in New York dance clubs, as well as on local urban-contemporary radio stations." Ecstasy said that audiences were finally ready for hip-hop music, and Whodini were "just beginning to break through on radio. Rather than listening to Stevie Wonder or someone do an inferior version of rap, people want to hear the real thing, with the original complexity to it. This is the most complex, interesting stuff going on in black music today, and the radio's just beginning to discover that the public eats it up." By December 1984, the 7- and 12-inch singles "Friends" and "Five Minutes of Funk" were approaching sales of 350,000, and received more airplay than the "Magic's Wand" and "Haunted House of Rock" from Whodini's debut studio album. Billboard reported the airplay, noting that despite the increased play, the songs were unreported and often played during the night. The month before Escape's release, Whodini appeared at the 1984 Swatch Watch New York City Fresh Fest as part of the first national tour featuring hip hop groups. The 27-date tour featured Run-DMC, Kurtis Blow, the Fat Boys and Newcleus, and grossed $3.5 million.

Escape was the first hip-hop album to break into the top 40 of the Billboard Top Pop Albums chart. By 1986, Escape and Run-DMC's Raising Hell were the bestselling hip-hop albums; both were certified platinum by the RIAA. Comparing the groups in 1986, the Los Angeles Times reported: "Though Whodini's record sales are impressive, Run-D.M.C. has been a greater media attraction and a bigger critical favorite." Escape was re-released on compact disc in 2011 by the Traffic Group with several bonus tracks.

== Critical reception ==
Professional ratings
Review scores
| Source | Rating |
|---|---|
| AllMusic | 4.5/5 stars |
| RapReviews | 10/10 (Note: An overall score based on a 10/10 rating for the music and a 10/10 rating for the lyrics.) |
| Record Collector | 2/5 stars |
| The Village Voice | B+ |
| Wisconsin State Journal | 2/5 stars |

In a contemporary review, Robert Christgau of The Village Voice gave Escape a grade of B+ and wrote that Hutchins and Smith "turn out ingratiating variations on a formula. Fortunately, the formula isn't tired yet." Although Christgau found the lyrics of "Freaks Come Out at Night" less intellectual than "Escape" or "Friends" and less musically interesting than "Five Minutes of Funk", he still considered it a strong song. NME described Escape as superior to Whodini's debut studio album and praised Smith's production, writing that his "sparse DMC sound here gives way to a rich and warm electronic soundscape". They went on to dub the title track as being the best song on the album, followed by "Big Mouth", "Out of Control", "We Are Whodini" and "Friends". They went on to say that "Featuring Grandmaster Dee" was Escape's weak link, calling it a "pointless instrumental reworking of "Five Minutes of Funk"." Spin praised "Escape (I Need a Break)", comparing it to Grandmaster Flash and the Furious Five's "The Message", writing that Whodini's song "focuses on the guy affected by social condition, not on the condition itself." Frances Litman wrote in Times Colonist that Escape "isn't bad (nor is it good)" comparing it favorably to West Street Mob's Break Dance Electric Boogie (1983) declaring Whodini "musically more mature than many of their counterparts" while stating both albums "are excessive in dragging out each song to nauseating limits of vinyl boredom" and that "Escape offers nothing more than the usual run of the rap." James Henke writing for Wisconsin State Journal gave the album a two out of five star rating, declaring the album "rap music for people who just want to party and don't want to have to think about the kinds of issues raised by someone like Afrika Bambaataa", concluding it was "not very interesting."

Among retrospective reviews, Fact noted that Escape was "eclipsed by the antics of the new school" and that it had "tumbled off of most casual fans' bucket lists." According to AllMusic, the album was a "vast improvement over the previous year's debut" with "a countless amount of memorable lines and productions, and has held up over time better than the debut", but that it was not "a conceptual masterpiece." The reviewer called "Freaks Come Out at Night" and "Five Minutes of Funk" classics, and said that "We Are Whodini" "distills the essence of the group more than the other groundbreaking tracks here, and still retains a sense of freshness." Trouser Press found the album "airy without being simple", and called it appealing and innovative. Fact placed Escape at number 98 on their list of top 1980s albums, calling it "diverting from end to end – something Spoonie G, The Cold Crush Brothers and The Furious Five conspicuously failed to deliver."

== Track listing ==
All songs are produced by Larry Smith.

Side A
| No. | Title | Composer(s) | Length |
|---|---|---|---|
| 1. | "Five Minutes of Funk" | Jalil Hutchins; Ecstacy; Larry Smith | 5:25 |
| 2. | "Freaks Come Out at Night" | Hutchins; Smith | 4:44 |
| 3. | "Featuring Grand Master Dee" | Smith | 5:45 |
| 4. | "Big Mouth" | Hutchins; Smith | 2:57 |

Side B
| No. | Title | Composer(s) | Length |
|---|---|---|---|
| 5. | "Escape (I Need a Break)" | Hutchins; Smith | 3:40 |
| 6. | "Friends" | Hutchins; Smith | 4:40 |
| 7. | "Out of Control" | Smith | 4:14 |
| 8. | "We Are Whodini" | Hutchins; Ecstacy; Larry Smith | 7:05 |

Escape — 2011 Traffic bonus track reissue
| No. | Title | Composer(s) | Length |
|---|---|---|---|
| 9. | "Escape (I Need a Break)" (Special Extended Mix) | Hutchins; Smith | 5:21 |
| 10. | "Escape (I Need a Break)" (A Capella) | Hutchins; Smith | 1:46 |
| 11. | "Escape (I Need a Break)" (Instrumental) | Hutchins; Smith | 3:38 |
| 12. | "Five Minutes of Funk" (Instrumental) | Hutchins; Smith | 5:44 |
| 13. | "Freaks Come Out at Night" (Instrumental) | Hutchins; Smith | 4:45 |
| 14. | "Friends" (Instrumental) | Hutchins; Smith | 4:44 |
| 15. | "Big Mouth" (Beat Box Mix) | Hutchins; Smith | 5:05 |
| 16. | "Big Mouth" (A Capella Mix) | Hutchins; Smith | 2:56 |
| 17. | "Grandmaster Dee's Haunted Scratch" | Hutchins; Smith | 3:32 |

== Charts ==
Chart performance for Escape
| Chart (1985) | Peak position |
|---|---|
| US Billboard 200 | 35 |

== Certifications ==
Certifications for Escape
| Region | Certification | Certified units/sales |
|---|---|---|
| United States (RIAA) | Platinum | 1,000,000^{^} |
^{^} Shipments figures based on certification alone.

== Personnel ==
Credits are adapted from the sleeve, sticker and back cover of Escape.

- Larry Smith – producer
- Nigel Green – engineer
- Ian Hooton – sleeve photography
- The Fish Family – sleeve design

== See also ==
- 1984 in hip-hop
- 1984 in music
- Old-school hip-hop
