= Whodini =

American hip hop group

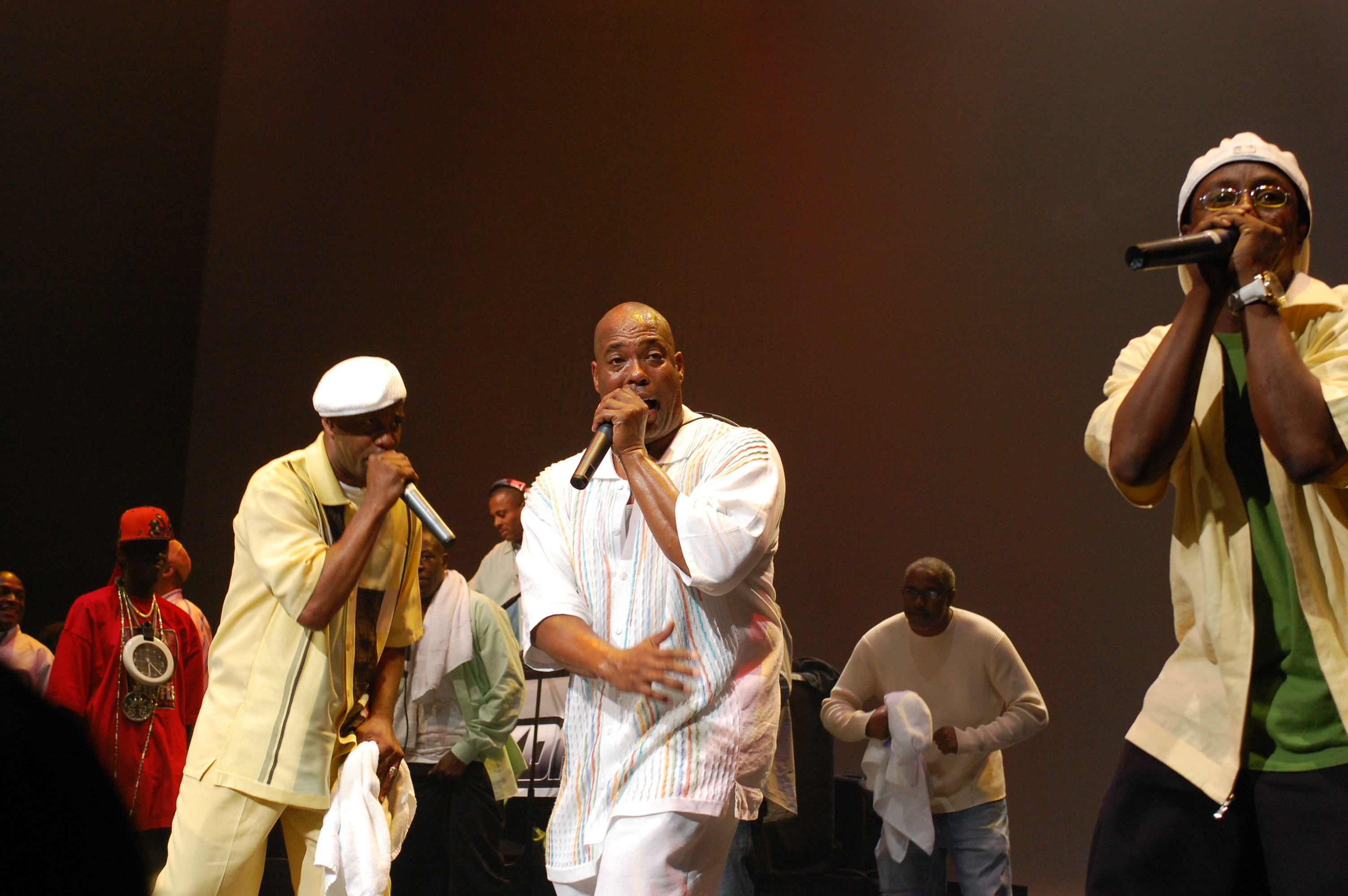
- Whodini performing at Fresh Fest in 2009

Background information
- Origin: Brooklyn, New York City, U.S.
- Genres: Hip-hop; electro
- Years active: 1982–present
- Labels: Jive/Arista; MCA; So So Def/Columbia/SME
- Members: Jalil Hutchins; Drew "Grandmaster Dee" Carter
- Past members: John "Ecstasy" Fletcher (deceased)

Whodini is an American hip-hop group that was formed in 1982. The Brooklyn, New York–based trio consisted of vocalist and main lyricist Jalil Hutchins; co-vocalist John Fletcher, a.k.a. Ecstasy (who wore a Zorro-style hat as his trademark; June 7, 1964 – December 23, 2020); and turntable artist DJ Drew Carter, a.k.a. Grandmaster Dee.

Coming out of the fertile New York rap scene of the early 1980s, Whodini was one of the first rap groups to add an R&B twist to their music, thus laying the foundation for a new genre: new jack swing. The group made its name with good-humored songs such as "Magic's Wand" (the first rap song accompanied by a music video), "The Haunted House of Rock", "Friends", "Five Minutes of Funk", and "Freaks Come Out at Night". Live performances of the group were the first rap concerts with the participation of breakdance dancers from the group UTFO. Russell Simmons was the manager of the group in the 1980s.

The group released six studio albums. Fourteen of the group's singles hit the Billboard charts. Four of the group's albums were certified Platinum by the RIAA.

== Career ==
=== Early years ===
Whodini was among the first hip hop groups to cultivate a high-profile national following for hip hop music and made significant inroads on urban radio. They were contemporaries of other hip hop groups such as Grandmaster Flash and the Furious Five, Afrika Bambaataa, Run-DMC, the Fat Boys and Warp 9. The group signed with London-based independent record label Jive Records in 1982; they enjoyed a string of hits for several years, mostly charting on urban and R&B radio stations. The bulk of production on its releases was done by Larry Smith, a bassist who also handled much of Run-DMC's early work.

In 1982, Whodini made a hip hop story with its debut single "Magic's Wand", an ode to hip hop radio pioneer Mr. Magic, which became the first hip hop song for which a music video was shot. Synth-pop and electro pioneer Thomas Dolby helped produce this single. "Magic's Wand" also has the distinction of being one of Whodini's most-sampled songs.

On July 8, 1983, the group released their self-titled debut studio album Whodini on vinyl and audio cassettes. The bulk of album was produced by influential German pioneer Conny Plank at his own studio near Cologne, Germany. On CD, the album was released in the United States only in 2010. The second single, "Haunted House of Rock", was released in time for Halloween 1983. Whodini combined the goofy fun of the Fat Boys with the virtuosity of Run-DMC to create what is the rap equivalent of horror movies. Heavy on the sound effects, the song is full of references to various famous monsters and boogymen – Count Dracula, Bloody Mary and the Invisible Man all show up.

=== Escape ===
In 1984, the group released their second studio album Escape. The entire album was fully produced by Larry Smith. Escape has been praised by the staff of Complex as "an early high watermark of party rap", with the album's melodicism and synth pop production being singled out for particular acclaim.

Many of these songs were also groundbreaking in hip hop culture, as each one of the songs told a unique story from the urban perspective. The album ended up being certified for platinum-level sales by the RIAA, selling over one million albums upon its release.

The instrumental version of "Five Minutes of Funk" was used as the theme music of the WNYC TV show Video Music Box, an influential early hip hop music video show. The album is out of print. On May 17, 2011, a deluxe version of Escape was released on CD with nine bonus tracks.

=== Back in Black ===
In 1986, the group released their third studio album Back in Black, fully produced by Smith. A number of songs from the album received heavy local New York airplay, such as "Funky Beat" and the controversial "I'm a Ho". "Fugitive" was guitar-driven funk and "Last Night (I Had a Long Talk With...)" was introspective. Paul Kodish, the drummer of Pendulum, was featured on the album.

=== Touring ===
From 1982 to 1986, the group was at its most productive; they toured with more successful groups such as Run-DMC, LL Cool J, the Fat Boys, and other prominent hip hop, R&B and funk bands. The group was involved in the first Fresh Fest tour, which was the first hip hop tour to play large coliseums nationwide. In July 1986, the group appeared at Philadelphia's Spectrum Stadium in front of an audience of 18,000. They were the first hip hop act and break dance troop to tour in the UK and Europe, with UTFO also appearing with the group as its break dance act.

=== Open Sesame and the New School ===
By 1987, the group had earned its share of gold singles and albums. With their fourth studio album Open Sesame, their final release of the 1980s, the group had turned away from their once-playful simple beats and catchy rhymes of the old-school, and instead became vocally harder and more instrument-driven, with guitars and horns and bells. They even began to sample, as a snippet of Cheryl Lynn's "Got to Be Real" is heard on the song "Now That Whodini's Inside the Joint". Smith again produced the entire album except for two tracks, "Be Yourself" and "I'm Def (Jump Back and Kiss Myself)", produced by Sinester.

This new-school style had been similarly done almost a year previously, on the commercially successful debut studio albums by LL Cool J and the Beastie Boys, as many groups had already turned to the kind of hip hop and rock music that crossed over easily, and Open Sesame failed to produce any real hits.

Although the group was still obligated to Jive Records, for the next few years the band eked out its tenure by occasionally only releasing singles, including "Anyway I Gotta Swing It" for the 1989 A Nightmare on Elm Street 5: The Dream Child movie soundtrack.

=== The 1990s to present ===
In the 1990s, the band made an attempt at a comeback, and in that same year the group signed with MCA Records and released their fifth album Bag-a-Trix in 1991, which failed to have commercial impact, as it tried again to reinvent using the then-current sound of new jack swing. Smith produced six of the tracks on the album, two of which co-authored with the band Major Jam Productions, which separately produced the other four tracks, and Fresh Gordon made music for the other four songs.

In mid-1994, the group scored a hit single with "It All Comes Down to the Money", which was co-produced by Public Enemy DJ Terminator X on his studio album Super Bad (1994).

Talks with Def Jam Recordings for a new deal stalled, and in 1996, the group was signed by Jermaine Dupri to his then-Columbia Records-distributed So So Def Recordings imprint. As a child in the 1980s, Dupri did a brief stint as a dancer for the group.

The group's sixth studio album Six produced one single, "Keep Running Back", and appeared briefly on the R&B chart. The album was fully produced by Dupri, except for three tracks, which were created by Dave Atkinson and Andy "Red Spyda" Thelusma.

Since the Six album, the group has not released any new music, but its older songs have been featured in many various old-school compilation albums and three greatest-hits collections have been released: The Jive Collection, Vol. 1 in 1995, Rap Attack in 2003, and Funky Beat: The Best of Whodini in 2006, which featured the seven-minute "Whodini Mega Mix", which was a medley of some of the biggest hits.

In recent years, Whodini still tours occasionally, and its old records still surface on pop and R&B radio, especially during old-school mix shows. The group's records have now become sample sources for contemporary emcees such as Nas, Master P, Prodigy, and MF Doom.

In October 2007, Whodini was an honoree at the 4th VH1 Hip Hop Honors.

In March 2012, Whodini was featured in Season 5 Episode 3 of the TV One hour-long music documentary series, Unsung.

In August 2012, Whodini was presented with the Icon Award by the Underground Music Awards.

In October 2012, Whodini was inducted into the 4th annual Long Island Music Hall of Fame.

On August 16, 2018, the group was awarded the Hip-Hop Icon Award at the third Black Music Honors ceremony held at the Tennessee Performing Arts Center in Nashville, Tennessee.

On December 23, 2020, Fletcher died at the age of 56.

== Discography ==
=== Studio albums ===
- Whodini (1983)
- Escape (1984)
- Back in Black (1986)
- Open Sesame (1987)
- Bag-a-Trix (1991)
- Six (1996)

== Filmography ==
=== Documentary ===
- 1990 – Rapmania: The Roots of Rap (TV Movie documentary)
- 2004 – And You Don't Stop: 30 Years of Hip-Hop (October 4, 2004)
- 2012 – Unsung: The Story of Whodini (by TV One) (March 12, 2012)

=== Television ===
- 1987 – It's Showtime at the Apollo (TV Series) ("One Love") (October 10, 1987)
- 1987 – Video Soul (TV Series) ("Be Yourself")
- 1987 – Invisible Thread (TV Movie)
- 1988 – 1988 Soul Train Music Awards (TV Special) (March 30, 1988)
- 1987 – Soul Train (TV Series) - episode "Freddie Jackson/Lace/Whodini" ("Be Yourself", "Life Is Like a Dance") (November 14, 1987)
- 1994 – In the Mix (TV Series) - episode "Hip Hop: Then & Now" (April 24, 1994)
- 2007 – 4th Annual VH1 Hip-Hop Honors (TV Special) (October 8, 2007)
- 2018 – 3rd Annual Black Music Honors (TV Special) (September 8, 2018)

=== Video collection ===
- 1986 – Back in Black (RCA / Columbia Pictures Home Video)
- 1990 – Greatest Rap Video Hits (BMG Video / Zomba Video / Jive)

Music videos
Year	Title
1982	"Magic's Wand"
1983	"Rap Machine"
1984	"Freaks Come Out at Night"
1984	"Big Mouth"
1984	"Escape (I Need a Break)"
1986	"Funky Beat"
1986	"One Love"
1986	"King Holiday" (King Dream Chorus and Holiday Crew)
1986	"Growing Up"
1987	"Be Yourself"
1987	"Rock You Again (Again & Again)"
1991	"Freaks"
1996	"Keep Running Back"

== Samples and remixes ==
- The drum beat from "Friends" is sampled in Public Enemy's "Sophisticated Bitch" from the album Yo! Bum Rush the Show.
- Dr. Dre used the beat of "I'm a Ho" for the Eazy-E song "Boyz-n-the-Hood (Remix)".
- Bone Thugs N Harmony re-recorded "Friends" and remixed it on The Art of War.
- The Firm's song "5 Minutes to Flush" samples "Five Minutes of Funk", and quotes its chorus.
- Jermaine Dupri's verse in "Welcome to Atlanta" samples the intro to "Five Minutes of Funk".
- Will Smith's song "Potnas", about friendship, samples "Friends", and quotes its chorus at the beginning.
- The bassline from "Friends" is sampled in Tupac Shakur's "Troublesome '96". In his unreleased song "Let's Be Friends", he also used the theme of "Friends".
- "Friends" is sampled in MF Doom's "Deep Fried Frenz", from the album Mm..Food.
- Pastor Troy remixed "Friends" into a song entitled "Benz".
- Nas used the chorus of the song "One Love" for his song of the same name.
- The bassline and chorus from "Friends" is sampled in Nas' "If I Ruled the World (Imagine That)".
- In the movie Next Friday, Day-Day and Roach were singing the song "Friends" while being held captive.
- Ice Cube and Master P's song "You Know I'm a Ho" from The Players Club is a remake of "I'm a Ho".
- Lil' Flip's song "I Got Flow" from his independent debut album The Leprechaun contains elements of "I'm a Ho".
- Beck sampled "Five Minutes of Funk" in his song "Gold Chains".
- Meshell Ndegeocello covers "Friends" on her eleventh album Comet, Come to Me.
