= Heaven in the Back Seat =

Single by Romeo's Daughter

from the album Romeo's Daughter
- A-side: "Heaven in the Back Seat"
- B-side: "Don't Look Back"
- Released: August 1989
- Genre: Album-oriented rock
- Length: 5:03 (album version); 3:55 (single edit)
- Label: Jive
- Songwriters: Robert John "Mutt" Lange; Craig Joiner; Anthony Mitman
- Producer: Robert John "Mutt" Lange

Romeo's Daughter singles chronology
"I Cry Myself to Sleep at Night" (1989)	"Heaven in the Back Seat" (1989)	"Attracted to the Animal" (1993)

Licensed audio
- "Heaven in the Back Seat" on YouTube

"Heaven in the Back Seat" is a song by British rock band Romeo's Daughter that was featured on their self-titled debut album (1988). It was made more popular when it was later featured on the soundtrack of the film A Nightmare on Elm Street 5: The Dream Child. The song stayed on the UK Singles Chart below the top 75 for two weeks and peaked at No. 97 on the week of 12 May 1990, becoming the band's only domestic hit.

== Music video ==
The video starts off with Romeo's Daughter performing at a concert, then Leigh Matty gets into a limo while singing and scenes are shown from A Nightmare on Elm Street 5: The Dream Child. She is then seen singing at another concert with more scenes from the film.

== Charts ==
Chart (1990)	Peak position
UK Singles (Official Charts)	97

== Eddie Money version ==
"Heaven in the Back Seat" was covered by American singer and songwriter Eddie Money in 1991 from his eighth album, Right Here (1991). His version reached No. 52 and 58 on the US Cash Box Top 100 and Billboard Hot 100, and No. 6 on the Billboard Mainstream Rock chart.

=== Charts ===
Chart (1991)	Peak position
US Billboard Hot 100	58
US Mainstream Rock (Billboard)	6
US Cash Box Top 100	52
