= Big House (American band) =

Country music band (1994–2000; 2007-08)

- Origin: Bakersfield, California, United States
- Genre: Country
- Years active: 1994—2000, 2007—2008
- Labels: MCA Nashville, Dead Reckoning, Big House
- Past members: Monty Byrom; David Neuhauser; Chuck Seaton; Tanner Byrom; Ron Mitchell; Billy Russell; Benny Rappa; Steve Vines; Joe Cruz; Sonny California

Big House was an American country music band based in Bakersfield, California. Originally, the band consisted of Monty Byrom (lead vocals, guitar), David Neuhauser (guitar, keyboards), Chuck Seaton (guitar), Tanner Byrom (drums), Sonny California (harmonica), and Ron Mitchell (bass guitar). Under this lineup, Big House recorded two albums for MCA Nashville: 1997's Big House and 1998's Travelin' Kind. These two albums produced four chart singles on the Billboard country charts, including the No. 30 hit "Cold Outside."

After the release of their second album, all of the band's members departed except for Monty Byrom and David Neuhauser. Benny Rappa was then signed as the band's new drummer, and Steve Vines assumed the role of bass guitarist. The revamped lineup recorded one album for Dead Reckoning Records before disbanding in 2000. The six original members reunited for concerts in 2007 and 2008, and released a fourth album in 2008 Never Ending Train.

== Biography ==
Although its six members (all natives of Bakersfield, California) had all performed together in various lineups, Big House was not officially formed until 1995, when brothers Monty and Tanner Byrom first performed with four other musicians at a venue in Oildale, California. After realizing that they all seemed to work well together, the six musicians decided to form a band. Monty Byrom, who had previously penned hit singles for Eddie Money, assumed the role of lead vocalist and guitarist, while Tanner served as drummer; the other four original members included harmonica player Roy Lackey (who assumed the stage name Sonny California), bass guitarist Ron Mitchell, and guitarists David Neuhauser, Billy Russell and Chuck Seaton.

== Major-label debut ==
Throughout the 1990s, Big House played throughout their native state of California. They had also tried to make themselves known in Nashville, Tennessee. Big House was not well received by Nashville until Neuhauser suggested that the band submit a demo tape to Tony Brown, president of MCA Nashville Records. A demo tape was sent to the label, and by 1997, the re-tooled demo tape was issued as the band's debut album, also titled Big House. Three of the album's singles entered the U.S. Billboard Hot Country Songs charts, including "Cold Outside", which peaked at No. 30. A second album, entitled Travelin' Kind, followed one year later; its lone single, "Faith", peaked at No. 63.

In 1998, the Academy of Country Music nominated Big House for the Top New Vocal Group or Duo award, alongside The Kinleys and The Lynns, losing to The Kinleys.

== Membership changes and disbanding ==
After the release of their second album, however, most of Big House's members parted ways; Tanner Byrom, Ron Mitchell and Chuck Seaton returned home and joined with Billy Russell to form the band "Hot Taco". Monty Byrom and Neuhauser then recruited Benny Rappa and Steve Vines, who took over on bass guitar and drums, respectively. The four-piece lineup recorded one album, Woodstock Nation, which was issued in 2000 on Dead Reckoning Records, an independent label owned by songwriters Kieran Kane and Kevin Welch. Big House disbanded shortly afterward. The six original members reunited in 2007 and 2008 for concerts in Bakersfield at Buck Owens' Crystal Palace, and released a fourth album in 2008, Never Ending Train. In April 2017, Sonny California died in Las Vegas following a brief illness.

== Discography ==
=== Albums ===
Title	Album details	Peak chart positions	
Title	Album details	US Country	US Heat
Big House	Release date: March 25, 1997; Label: MCA Nashville	33	21
Travelin' Kind	Release date: May 19, 1998; Label: MCA Nashville	—	—
Woodstock Nation	Release date: May 23, 2000; Label: Dead Reckoning	—	—
Never Ending Train	Release date: December 5, 2008; Label: Big House Records	—	—
"—" denotes releases that did not chart

=== Singles ===
Year	Single	Peak chart positions		Album
Year	Single	US Country	CAN Country	Album
1997	"Cold Outside"	30	16	Big House
1997	"You Ain't Lonely Yet"	57	75	Big House
1997	"Love Ain't Easy"	71	—	Big House
1998	"Faith"	63	—	Travelin' Kind
2000	"I'm Movin' On"	—	—	Woodstock Nation
"—" denotes releases that did not chart

=== Music videos ===
Year	Video	Director
1997	"Cold Outside"	Jim Shea
1997	"You Ain't Lonely Yet"	Jim Shea
1997	"Love Ain't Easy"	Jim Shea
1998	"Faith"	Jim Shea
2000	"I'm Movin' On"	Robert Cuffley

== Awards and nominations ==
Year	Organization	Award	Nominee/Work	Result
1998	Academy of Country Music Awards	Top New Vocal Group or Duo	Big House	Nominated
