= Don't Break My Heart (Romeo's Daughter song) =

Single by Romeo's Daughter

from the album Romeo's Daughter
- A-side: "Don't Break My Heart"
- B-side: "Wild Child"
- Released: 1988
- Recorded: 1988
- Genre: Rock
- Label: Jive
- Songwriters: Robert John "Mutt" Lange, Craig Joiner
- Producers: Robert John "Mutt" Lange & John Parr

Romeo's Daughter singles chronology
"Don't Break My Heart" (1988)	"I Cry Myself to Sleep at Night" (1988)

"Don't Break My Heart" is the debut single by British AOR band Romeo's Daughter, released in 1988. It is from the band's self-titled debut album. The song charted on the Billboard Hot 100 for seven weeks, peaking at No. 73 on the week of 12 November 1988, becoming their only American hit.

== Critical reception ==
Cash Box described the title of "Don't Break My Heart" as clichéd, but noted it as a "breakneck track that keeps charging".

== Charts ==
Chart (1988)	Peak position
US Billboard Hot 100	73
US Cash Box Top 100 Singles	68
