= Six (Whodini album) =

Studio album by Whodini
- Released: September 17, 1996
- Recorded: 1996
- Studio: KrossWire Studio (Atlanta, GA); Record One; Doppler Studios (Atlanta, GA); Mystic Studios; Bosstown Recording Studios (Atlanta, GA)
- Genre: Hip hop
- Length: 38:11
- Label: So So Def; Columbia
- Producer: Jermaine Dupri (also exec.); Dave Atkinson; Spyda; Carl So-Lowe

Whodini chronology
Bag-a-Trix (1991)	Six (1996)

Singles from Six
- 1. "Keep Running Back" Released: August 13, 1996

Professional ratings
Review scores
Source	Rating
AllMusic	3/5 stars
Entertainment Weekly	C+
Muzik	2/5 stars
The Source	2.5/5 stars

Six is the sixth and final studio album by American hip hop group Whodini. It was released on September 17, 1996 via So So Def/Columbia Records, making it the only album released for the label. Recording sessions took place at KrossWire Studio, Doppler Studios and Bosstown Recording Studios in Atlanta, at Record One and at Mystic Studios. Production was handled by Jermaine Dupri, who also served as executive producer, Dave Atkinson and Ross "Spyda" Sloan, with co-producer Carl So-Lowe. It features guest appearances from the Lost Boyz, Mr. Black, Nicole Jackson, R. Kelly, Trey Lorenz and Trina Broussard.

Unlike other albums, this is the first album of Whodini with extensive use of expletives in lyrics due to changes of the rap industry growing. Also, the album doesn't continue the trend of '80s-esque synthesizer sounds and discarded with a hard-core edge style pioneered by LL Cool J, Onyx and Run-DMC among others.

== Chart performance ==
In the United States, the album debuted at number 55 on the Billboard Top R&B Albums chart. Its lead single, "Keep Running Back", peaked at No. 69 on the Hot R&B Singles and No. 27 on the Hot Rap Songs charts.

== Track listing ==
No.	Title	Writer(s)	Producer(s)	Length
1.	"Brooklyn" (Intro)			0:05
2.	"Runnin' Em" (featuring Lost Boyz)	Terrance Kelly; Jermaine Mauldin	Jermaine Dupri	3:42
3.	"Be My Lady" (featuring R. Kelly)	Robert Kelly; Mauldin	Jermaine Dupri	3:48
4.	"Here He Comes" (Interlude)			0:38
5.	"Can't Get Enough"	Jalil Hutchins; Ross Sloan; Dave Atkinson; Sean Hamilton; Peter Pankey	Spyda; Dave Atkinson	5:15
6.	"Keep Running Back" (featuring Trey Lorenz)	Mauldin; James Harris III; Terry Lewis	Jermaine Dupri	3:34
7.	"If You Want It" (featuring Trina Broussard)	John Fletcher; Sloan; Atkinson; Hamilton; Pankey	Spyda; Dave Atkinson; Jermaine Dupri	4:51
8.	"Turn the Whole World Around" (Interlude)			0:18
9.	"Let Me Get Some" (featuring Nicole Jackson)	Mauldin; Vincent F. Bell	Jermaine Dupri	3:36
10.	"VIP" (featuring Mr. Black)	Hutchins; Altorre Randolph; Mauldin	Jermaine Dupri; Carl So-Lowe (co.)	3:30
11.	"Still Want More"	Sloan; Atkinson; Hamilton; Pankey	Spyda; Dave Atkinson	4:47
12.	"NBA" (Interlude)			0:09
13.	"Keep Running Back" (Remix)	Mauldin; Harris III; Lewis		3:52
Total length:				38:10

Sample credits

- Track 3 contains a replayed portion of "Your Body's Callin'" written by R. Kelly.
- Track 6 contains a replayed portion of "Everything I Miss at Home" written by Jimmy Jam and Terry Lewis.
- Track 7 contains a replayed portion of "Feels So Real (Won't Let Go)" by Patrice Rushen and Freddie Washington and a portion of "I Got My Mind Made Up (You Can Get It Girl)" by Kim Miller, Scotty Miller, Raymond Earl and S. Henrey.
- Track 9 contains a portion of "The Finer Things in Life" by Chuck Stanley.
- Track 10 contains a replayed portion of "Kamurshol" written by Lorenzo Patterson, Andre Young and J. Starr.

== Personnel ==
- Jalil Hutchins — main artist, vocals
- John "Ecstacy" Fletcher — main artist, vocals
- Drew "Grandmaster D" Carter — main artist
- The Lost Boyz — additional vocals (track 2)
- Robert Kelly — additional vocals (track 3)
- Lloyd "Trey Lorenz" Smith — additional vocals (track 6)
- Trina Broussard — additional vocals (track 7)
- Nicole Jackson — additional vocals (track 9)
- Altorre "Mr. Black" Randolph — additional vocals (track 10)
- LaMarquis Jefferson — bass (tracks: 3, 13), guitar (track 10)
- Jermaine Dupri — producer (tracks: 2, 3, 6, 7, 9, 10), mixing (tracks: 2–3, 5–7, 9–11, 13), executive producer
- Ross "Spyda" Sloan — producer & mixing (tracks: 5, 7, 11)
- Dave Atkinson — producer & mixing (tracks: 5, 7, 11)
- Carl So-Lowe — producer (track 10), re-mixing (track 13)
- Phil Tan — mixing (tracks: 2, 3, 5–7, 9–11, 13), recording (tracks: 3, 10)
- Mike Wilson — recording (tracks: 5, 7)
- Dexter Simmons — recording (track 5)
- Mike Alvord — recording (track 11)
- Alex Lowe — engineering assistant (tracks: 2, 6, 13)
- Brian Frye — engineering assistant (tracks: 3, 5, 7, 10)
- Kevin Lively — engineering assistant (tracks: 9, 11)
- Brian Lee — mastering
- LaTanya Davis — art direction
- Danny Clinch — photography
- Frank Edwards — A&R
- Diane Makowski — A&R
- Shanique Hill — stylist

== Charts ==
Chart (1996)	Peak position
US Top R&B Albums (Billboard)	55
