= Bag-a-Trix =

Studio album by Whodini
- Released: March 19, 1991
- Recorded: 1990–1991
- Studio: Rawlston Recording (Brooklyn, NY); Unique Recording (New York, NY); Music Palace (West Hempstead, Long Island, NY)
- Genre: Hip hop
- Length: 1:01:23
- Label: MCA
- Producer: Larry Smith; Fresh Gordon; Joe Simmons; Major Jam Productions

Whodini chronology
Open Sesame (1987)	Bag-a-Trix (1991)	Six (1996)

Singles from Bag-A-Trix
- 1. "Freaks" Released: 1991; 2. "Judy" Released: 1991

Professional ratings
Review scores
Source	Rating
AllMusic	2/5 stars
The Rolling Stone Album Guide	3.5/5 stars

Bag-a-Trix is the fifth studio album by the American hip hop group Whodini, their only album for MCA Records. It was released in 1991 and includes the singles "Freaks" and "Judy". The production was handled by Larry Smith, Fresh Gordon, Joe Simmons, and Major Jam Production.

== Chart performance ==
Bag-a-Trix peaked at number 48 on the Billboard Top R&B Albums chart in May 1991. The singles, "Freaks" and "Judy", peaked at Nos. 73 and 65, respectively, on the Hot R&B Singles chart.

== Track listing ==
No.	Title	Producer(s)	Length
1.	"The Intro"	Joe Simmons; Larry Smith	2:49
2.	"Judy"	Fresh Gordon	3:49
3.	"Freaks"	Larry Smith; Major Jam Productions	4:20
4.	"Smilin' Faces Sometimes"	Larry Smith	5:37
5.	"Bag-A-Trix"	Fresh Gordon	3:39
6.	"Taste of Love"	Fresh Gordon	4:44
7.	"Inside the Joint"	Fresh Gordon	4:34
8.	"Lovers or Friends"	Larry Smith; Major Jam Productions	5:26
9.	"The Party Don’t Start" (featuring Dynasty And Mimi)	Major Jam Productions	4:26
10.	"Day to Day"	Major Jam Productions	4:36
11.	"Milk My Cow"	Larry Smith	3:35
12.	"Nite for Jammin'"	Major Jam Productions	4:21
13.	"That’s Life" (remix version)	Major Jam Productions	5:03
14.	"Bad Case of Love"	Larry Smith	4:24
Total length:			1:01:23

== Personnel ==
- Jalil Hutchins - performer
- John "Ecstacy" Fletcher - performer
- Dynasty And Mimi - performer (track 9)
- Lawrence Michael Smith - producer (tracks: 1, 3–4, 8, 11, 14)
- Gordon Wayne Pickett - producer (tracks: 2, 5–7)
- Joe Simmons - producer (track 1)
- Major Jam Productions - producer (tracks: 3, 8–10, 12–13)
- Charlie Harrison - guitar (track 3)
- Akili Walker - mixing & recording (tracks: 1–12, 14)
- Peter Robbins - mixing, recording (track 13)
- Dino Esposito - mixing (tracks: 1–12, 14)
- George Mayers - mixing (tracks: 1–12, 14)
- Howie Weinberg - mastering
