= Right Here (Eddie Money album) =

Studio album by Eddie Money
- Released: September 10, 1991
- Recorded: 1990–1991
- Studio: Goodnight LA Studios (Van Nuys, California); Cherokee Studios (Hollywood, California); Woodcliff Studio (Sherman Oaks, California); The Barn (Tarzana, California); Record Plant (Los Angeles, California); The Enterprise (Burbank, California); Scream Studios (Studio City, California); Power Station (New York City, New York)
- Genre: Hard rock; pop rock
- Length: 38:23
- Label: Columbia
- Producer: Eddie Money; Monty Byrom; Randy Jackson; Keith Olsen; Marc Tanner

Eddie Money chronology
Greatest Hits: The Sound of Money (1989)	Right Here (1991)	Unplug It In (1992)

Singles from Right Here
- 1. "Heaven in the Back Seat" Released: 1991; 2. "I'll Get By" Released: 1991; 3. "She Takes My Breath Away" Released: 1992; 4. "Fall in Love Again" Released: 1992

Right Here is the eighth studio album by the American rock musician Eddie Money. It was released in September 1991 by Columbia Records and yielded four singles, three of which would make the Billboard Hot 100 chart, including the song "I'll Get By" which made it to number 21. The video for "I'll Get By" is dedicated to the producer Bill Graham who had worked with Money on previous projects.

Reaching only number 160 on the Billboard 200 albums chart, Right Here would be Money's final chart appearance with an album of new material, and his singles from the album would mark his final pop chart appearances.

Professional ratings
Review scores
Source	Rating
AllMusic	2.5/5 stars

== Track listing ==
No.	Title	Writer(s)	Length
1.	"Heaven in the Back Seat"	Craig Joiner, Robert John "Mutt" Lange	4:02
2.	"She Takes My Breath Away"	Gary Bromham, Monty Byrom, Eddie Money, Dennis Morgan, Marc Tanner	4:19
3.	"Another Nice Day in L.A."	Byrom, John Corey, Stan Lynch, Money	3:37
4.	"Fall in Love Again"	Byrom, Jeff Kossack, Money	4:25
5.	"Run Right Back"	Diane Warren	3:11
6.	"Things Are Much Better Today"	Byrom, Money, Greg Lowry	3:50
7.	"Fire and Water"	Byrom, Money, Jerry Deaton	4:14
8.	"Prove It Every Night"	Byrom, Money, Deaton, David Neuhauser	3:21
9.	"Think Twice"	Tommy Girvin, Money, Tanner	3:53
10.	"I'll Get By"	Antonina Armato, Money, Andy Hill	3:31
Total length:			38:23

== Personnel ==
=== Musicians ===
- Eddie Money – lead vocals, backing vocals, Synclavier
- Kim Bullard – keyboards
- Monty Byrom – keyboards, guitars, backing vocals
- Jerry Deaton – keyboards
- Brian Gary – keyboards
- Claude Gaudette – keyboards, drum programming
- Paul Mirkovich – keyboards
- John Corey – guitars, arrangements (3)
- Tommy Girvin – guitars, backing vocals
- Steve Farris – guitars
- Don Cromwell – bass guitar
- Bob Glaub – bass guitar
- Randy Jackson – bass guitar
- Don Schiff – bass guitar
- Mike Baird – drums, drum programming
- Charley Drayton – drums
- John Snyder – drums
- Glenn Symmonds – drums
- Jack White – drums
- Tommy Funderburk – backing vocals
- John Levesque – backing vocals
- Marc Tanner – backing vocals
- The Smog Tones (Kenny Edwards, Andrew Gold and Brock Walsh) – backing vocals

=== Production ===
- Randy D. Jackson – executive producer, additional producer (1–3, 10), producer (4)
- Eddie Money – producer, recording (10), mixing (10)
- Keith Olsen – producer (1, 10)
- Marc Tanner – producer (2, 9)
- Monty Byrom – producer (3–8), recording (6, 7), mixing (6–8)
- Allen Abrahamson – engineer (1)
- Shay Baby – engineer (1, 10), recording (10), mixing (10)
- David Leonard – mixing (1, 3)
- David Thoener – recording (2, 9), mixing (2, 9)
- Frank Anthony – engineer (3, 5–8), recording (6, 7), mixing (6–8)
- Kim Bullard – engineer (4)
- Rob Jacobs – mixing (4, 5)
- Victor Deyglio – second engineer (1, 3), additional engineer (1, 3)
- Jim Rondinelli – additional engineer (1, 3)
- Steve Heinke – additional recording (2, 9)
- Tim Nitz – assistant engineer (2, 9)
- Scott Ralston – assistant engineer (2, 9)
- Fred Kelly – mix assistant (2, 9)
- Christopher Zerbe – second engineer (3, 5, 7)
- Wally Traugott – mastering at Capitol Studios (Hollywood, California)
- Nancy Donald – art direction
- Pietro Alfieri – design
- Diego Uchitel – photography
- Bill Graham Management – direction

== Charts ==
Chart (1991–1992)	Peak position
Australian Albums (ARIA)	160
US Billboard 200	160
