= Freaks Come Out at Night =

1984 single by Whodini

Single by Whodini

from the album Escape
- B-side: "Grandmaster Dee's Haunted Scratch"
- Released: 1984
- Recorded: 1984
- Genre: Electro; funk
- Length: 4:44
- Label: Jive
- Songwriters: Jalil Hutchins; Lawrence Smith
- Producer: Larry Smith

Whodini singles chronology
"Friends" / "Five Minutes of Funk" (1984)	"Freaks Come Out at Night" (1984)	"Escape (I Need a Break)" (1985)

Music video
- "Freaks Come Out at Night" on YouTube

"Freaks Come Out at Night" is a song by American hip-hop group Whodini. It is the second single from their second studio album Escape (1984) and one of their signature songs.

== Background ==
Jalil Hutchins stated in a Q&A with al.com,

"Freaks Come Out at Night" went through phases to get to that hook. The first initial thought was really making a song competitive with that Pat Benatar stuff that was out. [The song] was so poppy but the hook was kind of weak, so I started looking at the funk bands and their use of "freak." All of those songs, thinking of Rick James and all those characters. And 42nd Street in New York City is a hectic set, and thinking about the nightlife of New York and all of a sudden [the song] changed into something like funk and "Freaks Come Out at Night".

== Critical reception ==
Jason Elias of AllMusic wrote, "The just-as-good 'Freaks Come Out at Night' has the guys talking about nocturnal freaks with vivid lyrics and a little too much inside information." Robert Christgau wrote, "Even the putative follow-up 'Freaks Come Out at Night,' dumber lyrically than 'Escape' and 'Friends' and dumber musically than the irresistible 'Five Minutes of Funk,' is five minutes of fun."

== Music video ==
The music video sees Jalil Hutchins wearing a feather earring, which he said was a replacement for a wig and "the closest thing I could get that was part funk, part freak." The video features appearances from UTFO and Run-DMC, who are seen leaving a tour bus in Baltimore, and future rapper Jermaine Dupri, then a dancer for Whodini.

== Charts ==
Chart (1985)	Peak position
UK Singles (OCC)	97
US Hot Black Singles (Billboard)	43
US Hot Dance/Club Play (Billboard)	25
