= Friends (Whodini song) =

Single by Whodini

from the album Escape
- B-side: "Five Minutes of Funk"
- Released: July 20, 1984
- Recorded: 1984
- Genre: Hip hop
- Length: 4:38
- Label: Jive Records
- Songwriters: Jalil Hutchins, Lawrence Smith
- Producer: Larry Smith

Whodini singles chronology
"Yours for a Night" (1983)	"Friends" (1984)	"Freaks Come Out at Night" (1984)

"Friends" is a song by the American hip-hop group Whodini. The song reached #4 on the U.S. Billboard Hot R&B/Hip-Hop Songs chart.

== Chart performance ==
Chart (1984–85)	Peak position
US Billboard Hot 100	87
US Hot Black Singles (Billboard)	4
Billboard Dance/Disco	25

== Samples ==
- Public Enemy sampled the drum beat for their song "Sophisticated Bitch" from their first album.
- The song was interpolated in Nas' song "If I Ruled The World (Imagine That)" from his 1996 album It Was Written.
- Dr. Dre sampled the track for "A Nigga Witta Gun" from the 1992 album The Chronic.
- The song was sampled on the Nickelodeon sitcom Taina on the song "Thought that we were friends", sung by Christina Vidal who played the title character.
- The song was also sampled by Will Smith for the track "Potnas" on his 1999 album Willennium.
- MF Doom sampled it for the track "Deep Fried Frenz" on his 2004 album Mm...Food.
- Bad Azz sampled it for the track "Ghetto Star" for his 1998 debut album Word On Tha Streets.
- 2Pac sampled it for the track "Troublesome '96" from his posthumous Greatest Hits album.
- 213 sampled it in their debut song "Friends" from member Nate Dogg's 1998 album G-Funk Classics, Vol. 1 & 2.
- Bone Thugs-n-Harmony sampled it in their song "Friends" (renamed to "How Many of Us Have Them" on some releases) on their 1997 album The Art of War.
- Kendrick Lamar sampled the song in "wacced out murals," the first track of his 2024 album GNX.

The song was also used in a commercial for Corona Extra in 2023, which featured Snoop Dogg and Bad Bunny.
