= A Nightmare on Elm Street 5: The Dream Child =

1989 film by Stephen Hopkins

- Theatrical release poster by Matthew Peak
- Directed by: Stephen Hopkins
- Screenplay by: Leslie Bohem
- Story by: John Skipp; Craig Spector; Leslie Bohem
- Based on: Characters by Wes Craven; Bruce Wagner; William Kotzwinkle; Brian Helgeland
- Produced by: Robert Shaye; Rupert Harvey
- Starring: Robert Englund; Lisa Wilcox
- Cinematography: Peter Levy
- Edited by: Brent A. Schoenfeld; Chuck Weiss
- Music by: Jay Ferguson
- Production companies: New Line Cinema; Heron Communications; Smart Egg Pictures
- Distributed by: New Line Cinema
- Release date: August 11, 1989
- Running time: 89 minutes
- Country: United States
- Language: English
- Budget: $8 million
- Box office: $22.1 million (US)

A Nightmare on Elm Street 5: The Dream Child (Note: Titled on-screen as simply A Nightmare on Elm Street: The Dream Child) is a 1989 American gothic slasher film directed by Stephen Hopkins and written by Leslie Bohem. It is the sequel to A Nightmare on Elm Street 4: The Dream Master (1988) and the fifth installment in the A Nightmare on Elm Street franchise. It stars Lisa Wilcox, and Robert Englund as Freddy Krueger. The film follows Krueger, using a now pregnant Alice Johnson's baby's dreams to claim new victims.

Following the success of the previous film, Hopkins was quickly hired to direct a sequel. The general tone is much darker than that of the previous films, with a blue filter lighting technique used in most of the scenes. The film had a troubled production, with many changes made to the script during pre-production, and had many scenes removed from the final cut.

A Nightmare on Elm Street 5: The Dream Child was released by New Line Cinema on August 11, 1989. The film grossed $22.1 million on a budget of $8 million, marking a steep decline in box office receipts from its two predecessors, though still a box office success and became the highest-grossing slasher film of 1989. It received generally negative reviews from critics.

It was followed by 1991 sequel film; Freddy's Dead: The Final Nightmare.

== Plot ==
A year after surviving Freddy Krueger's killing spree, (Note: As depicted in A Nightmare on Elm Street 4: The Dream Master (1988)) Alice Johnson is in a relationship with Dan Jordan. One day, while taking a shower after having sex with Dan, Alice has a vision of herself dressed in a nun's habit with a name tag saying Amanda Krueger, at a strange asylum. She is attacked by patients at the hospital but wakes up. The next day, Alice is graduating from high school alongside her new friends: Greta Gibson, an aspiring but reluctant supermodel; Mark Gray, a comic book fan; and Yvonne Miller, a hospital volunteer and swimmer. Alice confides her nightmare to Dan, who tells her she is in control of her dreams.

On her way to work, Alice finds herself back at the asylum, where she sees Amanda giving birth to a gruesomely deformed baby. Amanda tries to collect the baby before it escapes, but it sneaks out of the operating room. Alice follows the baby into the church where she defeated Freddy in the previous film. The baby finds Freddy's remains and quickly grows into an adult, hinting to Alice that he has found the key to coming back. Alarmed, she contacts Dan, who falls asleep en route to see her. Freddy attacks and electrocutes Dan, turning him into a frightful man/machine hybrid before sending him into oncoming traffic. Alice sees Dan's body come to life and taunt her before she faints. Waking in a hospital, she hears the news of Dan's death and that she is pregnant with his child. During the night, she is visited by a young boy named Jacob, but the next day, Yvonne tells her there are no children on her floor, nor is there a children's ward.

Alice tells her friends about Freddy and his lineage. Yvonne refuses to listen, but Mark and Greta are more supportive. That afternoon, at a dinner party at her home, Greta falls asleep at the table. She dreams of herself snapping at her mother and ranting about her controlling nature before Freddy arrives and forces Greta to eat her own organs before choking her in front of a laughing audience. In the real world, Greta falls down dead in front of her mother and their guests. Yvonne and Alice visit Mark, who is grieving Greta's death, and a rift forms between them. Mark falls asleep and is nearly killed by Freddy, but Alice saves him before seeing Jacob again. Jacob hints that Alice is his mother. Alice requests that Yvonne get her an early ultrasound and discovers Freddy is using Jacob as a conduit to attack her friends even when she is awake and has been feeding him his victims to make him like himself.

Yvonne and Dan's parents still believe Alice is crazy. Dan's parents insist that she give them the baby when it is born, which Alice refuses. Alice and Mark research Krueger and the nun Amanda. Realizing Amanda was trying to stop Freddy, they investigate her whereabouts, and Alice goes to sleep, hoping to find Amanda at the asylum. While there, Freddy lures her away by threatening Yvonne, who has fallen asleep in a Jacuzzi. Alice rescues Yvonne, who finally believes her. Mark falls asleep and is pulled into a comic book world, where, after becoming a superhero to fight Freddy, he turns into a supervillain, transforms Mark into a paper cutout, and slashes him to pieces.

Alice goes to bed to find Freddy and save her son. Realizing Freddy has been hiding within her every time she fell asleep, she draws Freddy out from within herself. Yvonne finds Amanda's remains at the asylum, and Amanda joins the fight in the dream world, encouraging Jacob to use the power Freddy had been giving him. Jacob destroys Freddy, and his infant form is absorbed by his mother, while Alice picks up baby Jacob. Warning Alice away, Amanda seals Freddy away in time.

Several months later, Jacob Daniel Johnson is enjoying a picnic with his mother, grandfather, and Yvonne. Some children jumping rope nearby are humming Freddy's rhyme, hinting at Freddy's return.

== Cast ==
- Lisa Wilcox as Alice Johnson. Director Stephen Hopkins was keen for Wilcox to return as Alice, feeling that her story from the previous installment remained incomplete. Whilst Wilcox received top billing in the opening credits, her name was accidentally omitted from the end credits. The character of Alice is more assertive in this film compared to its predecessor and she eventually gives birth at the end of the film to her and Dan's child.
- Robert Englund as Freddy Krueger / asylum inmate / waiter. Englund's makeup was refined again for this film by Howard Berger to make Freddy look older than in previous installments.
- Kelly Jo Minter as Yvonne Miller. According to director Stephen Hopkins in the 2010 documentary Never Sleep Again, he cast Minter as she "rocked, she was a real firebrand". Minter enjoyed acting in the film but found her diving scenes near the end challenging as she was suffering from food poisoning at the time. Along with Alice, Yvonne survives at the film's conclusion.
- Erika Anderson as Greta Gibson. Greta's character is that of a model who is constantly having to watch her diet. Anderson's death scene, where she is force-fed by Krueger required the actress to undergo a lengthy makeup process and the final scene was severely cut down to comply with the MPAA.
- Danny Hassel as Dan Jordan. Along with Alice, Dan is the only other teenage survivor from the fourth film but is killed early on in The Dream Child. Hassel felt lucky that the producers had remembered him enough to ask him back for the sequel but, as with Erika Anderson, had to ensure a lengthy makeup process for his death scene which was also heavily edited down to comply with the MPAA.
- Beatrice Boepple as Amanda Krueger. The character of Amanda Krueger, a nun who was raped at an asylum and later gave birth to Freddy, was previously played by Nan Martin in A Nightmare on Elm Street 3: Dream Warriors. Boepple plays a younger version of the same character but found the birth sequence difficult as she was on her period.
- Whit Hertford as Jacob Johnson. Hertford was 11 years old when he was cast as Jacob, a future version of Alice's son. Hertford was already experienced acting in the horror genre having appeared in Poltergeist II: The Other Side (1986) and the revived Twilight Zone series. As a minor, he was not permitted to utter the scripted phrase "Fuck you, Krueger".
- Joe Seely as Mark Gray. Mark is a comic book fan, who has an unreciprocated crush on Greta. Seely recalled in 2010 that he wanted the character to look more gothic but was given dyed blonde hair and bright waistcoats in order to complement Erika Anderson better. For his death scene which takes place in a comic book world, Seely had to have extra makeup to appear brighter on screen. Mark's death was also heavily edited in accordance with MPAA guidelines.
- Nicholas Mele as Dennis Johnson. Mele plays Alice's father, also returning from the previous film. According to Mele in an interview for the Never Sleep Again documentary, a death scene for his character had been shot for the previous film but omitted due to time constraints, thus meaning the producers could bring him back for this film. Alice's father in this film is a reformed alcoholic and more assertive in supporting his daughter when she discovers that she is pregnant.
- Burr DeBenning as Mr. Jordan. DeBenning was already known to the film's producers, having a played the role of Dr Serling in the episode "It's a Miserable Life" from the spin-off TV series Freddy's Nightmares. Mr Jordan wants Dan to pursue a football career and later threatens to have Alice institutionalized in order to gain custody of her child.
- Clarence Felder as Mr. Gray

Freddy Krueger is also briefly portrayed onscreen by actors Michael Bailey Smith (as 'Super Freddy') and Noble Craig (as 'Merging Freddy').

== Production ==
"Freddy is the only constant. What I've done is take that constant and move the film more in the direction of a mystery and ghost story. I've never been a real fan of gore, and so it was never my intention to throw all kinds of blood and guts up on the screen."
[...]
"Freddy, to my way of thinking, has become too overexposed. People know he's coming, so his appearance is not necessarily frightening. So I had to think about what makes a good horror movie and what gets the old adrenaline pumping. In the case of Nightmare 5, I found that making Freddy less jokey and more brutal in his action was the key."

— Director Stephen Hopkins on trying to put Freddy back into the shadows (1989)

Following the commercial success of A Nightmare on Elm Street 4: The Dream Master (1988), New Line Cinema began developing a fifth film for release in 1989. Screenwriter Leslie Bohem had previously proposed a story involving Freddy Krueger possessing an unborn child. In a 1989 interview with Fangoria, Bohem recalled that he had originally developed the concept while being considered as a writer for A Nightmare on Elm Street 2: Freddy's Revenge (1985), but that the idea was rejected at the time because New Line executive Sara Risher was pregnant and reportedly found the premise disturbing. By the time of the pre-production of the fourth sequel however, the producers decided to return to Bohem's pregnancy pitch; Risher herself was instrumental in pursuing the pregnancy storyline for the fifth installment, also feeling that Alice should ultimately make the personal decision to keep her baby but nonetheless present abortion as a very real possibility and not force an anti-abortionist angle. In the book Assault of the Killer B's: Interviews with 20 Cult Film Actresses, it is stated on the film that "not only was the Gothic visual look of the film soaked in black, orange and blue hues, but the storyline focused on social commentary about teen pregnancy, abortion, a young mother’s rights, bulimia and drunk driving", while Lisa Wilcox stated that The Dream Child "is a very dark film in both story and look. It deals with issues of teen sex, pregnancy, abortion, and what rights a teen mother has when Dan’s parents want to adopt the baby and raise it as their own."

The screenplay underwent extensive revisions during pre-production. John Skipp and Craig Spector developed one draft, originally titled The Dream Pool, while Bohem independently wrote another in December 1988. New Line subsequently commissioned further revisions from Bohem, who worked with director Stephen Hopkins before leaving the project because of other commitments. William Wisher Jr. and David J. Schow later contributed additional revisions, particularly to the characters and dialogue. Bohem ultimately received the screenplay credit, while Skipp and Spector shared story credit with him.

The film has a scene where the character Mark Gray is sucked into a comic book; according to Bohem, all the prospective writers had, independently of each other, written a scene where a character goes into a comic book. Screnwriter Larry Wilson had used this idea in a rejected draft for a potential Beetlejuice 2 film and let Bohem have the scene rather than seeing it go to waste completely.

The previous installment, The Dream Master, had been "aimed at the MTV audience" with Freddy appearing as "almost a stand-up comedian", but for its sequel, New Line Cinema decided to go for a darker tone, returning Freddy to the shadows of the first three films. Makeup specialist Kevin Yagher wanted to make Freddy "look worse for the wear" and "older, more sinister" after his previous defeat by Alice, also giving Freddy a hook nose, akin to a witch.

Hopkins pursued a more Gothic and expressionistic visual approach than the previous films, incorporating elaborate dream environments and surreal architecture. In a 2025 interview for the Development Hell podcast, he reflected on the production's ambitious visual design and the difficulties caused by its compressed schedule.

The film initially received an X rating from the Motion Picture Association of America because of its graphic violence. The deaths of Dan, who transforms into a motorcycle, and Greta, who is force-fed by Freddy, were substantially shortened to secure an R rating for the theatrical release. The cuts were reported by The Hollywood Reporter in November 1989.

=== Deleted scenes ===
Several scenes were removed from the final cut. The graduation sequence, which showed Alice's father giving her the camera, was significantly reduced. As a result, there are several minor continuity errors such as Alice holding airplane tickets moments before Dan gives them to her as a surprise gift.

Upon its release, the movie was also subjected to some cuts in the sequences of Dan's, Mark's and Greta's deaths to avoid being classified "X" by the MPAA due to their extremely violent and graphic nature. An unrated version of the film, which contained longer, more graphic versions of Dan's, Greta's and Mark's death scenes, was originally released on VHS and LaserDisc formats. In Dan's scene, cables can be seen sliding under the skin of Dan's arm, a large piece of the bike pierces his leg, and the skin on Dan's head is much more graphically torn off while he screams in pain. In Greta's scene, Freddy slices open a doll that begins to bleed and Greta is shown to have a gaping wound in her stomach, from which Freddy starts to feed to her. In Australia, the scenes were cut in cinemas, but restored to the VHS release.

== Music ==
The soundtrack has ten tracks. The first side is heavy metal and hard rock songs, and the second is primarily hip hop songs.

Track listing

No.	Title	Artist	Length
1.	"Bring Your Daughter... to the Slaughter"	Bruce Dickinson	5:03
2.	"Heaven in the Back Seat"	Romeo's Daughter	3:58
3.	"Savage"	W.A.S.P.	3:28
4.	"Can't Take the Hurt"	Mammoth	4:21
5.	"What Do You Know About Rock 'n' Roll"	Slave Raider	3:34
6.	"Any Way I Gotta Swing It"	Whodini	4:30
7.	"Now I Lay Me Down"	Samantha Fox	4:17
8.	"Let's Go"	Kool Moe Dee	5:25
9.	"Word Up Doc!"	Doctor Ice	3:24
10.	"Livin' in the Jungle"	Schoolly D	3:36

Bruce Dickinson, lead singer of the heavy metal band Iron Maiden, wrote and performed "Bring Your Daughter... to the Slaughter" for the film's soundtrack. Dickinson recorded the song as a solo project with guitarist Janick Gers, who subsequently joined Iron Maiden. After hearing the recording, bassist Steve Harris suggested that Iron Maiden record their own version, which appeared on the band's 1990 album No Prayer for the Dying. Released as a single in December 1990, Iron Maiden's version reached number one on the UK Singles Chart dated 5 January 1991, becoming the band's only UK number-one single.

=== Film score ===
Professional ratings
Review scores
Source	Rating
AllMusic	2/5 stars

All tracks are written by Jay Ferguson.

A Nightmare on Elm Street 5: The Dream Child - Original Motion Picture Score
No.	Title	Length
1.	"Prologue – Elm Street Kids"	0:48
2.	"Main Title (Contains "A Nightmare on Elm Street" Theme by Charles Bernstein)"	3:22
3.	""It's A Boy" (Contains "A Nightmare on Elm Street" Theme by Charles Bernstein)"	0:59
4.	"Freddy Delivers"	1:18
5.	"Family Plot"	1:32
6.	"Yvonne Takes The Plunge"	0:54
7.	"Mr. Sandman, Bring Me A Dream"	1:17
8.	"Don't Dream & Drive"	1:17
9.	"Like Father, Like Son"	2:02
10.	"Mark Visits Elm Street (Contains "A Nightmare on Elm Street" Theme by Charles Bernstein)"	1:43
11.	"Hell On Wheels"	2:10
12.	"Another Brick In The Wall"	1:30
13.	"Stuffed / Choked (Gag Me With A Spoon)"	1:32
14.	"Shower"	0:43
15.	"The Asylum"	1:13
16.	"There Was A Crooked Man"	1:51
17.	"Freddy's Stroller"	1:22
18.	"Super Freddy"	1:17
19.	"Twins"	1:15
20.	"Freddy Cuts"	1:47
21.	"Mr. And Mrs. Jordan"	1:47
22.	"Party At Club Fred"	1:27
23.	"Amanda's Tune"	1:23
24.	"Jacob's Story"	1:00
25.	"Bewitched, Bothered And Bewildered"	1:15
26.	"Don't Look Down"	0:46
27.	"St. Elm Street's Child"	1:59
28.	"Toys For Tots"	1:19
29.	"I've Got You Under My Skin"	0:54
30.	"Kicking And Screaming"	1:03
31.	"Womb With A V.U"	1:52

==== Bonus tracks ====
No.	Title	Length
1.	"Nightmare Theme Insert A" (Original A Nightmare on Elm Street Theme by Charles Bernstein)	0:15
2.	"Nightmare Theme Insert B" (Original A Nightmare on Elm Street Theme by Charles Bernstein)	0:37
3.	"Bed Fred Sting"	0:05
4.	"Wake Up"	0:23
5.	"New Line Logo / Main Title (Film Version)"	3:22
6.	"Rape / Bed Fred / Freddy Sting"	0:39
7.	"Elm Street Kids (Contains "A Nightmare on Elm Street" Theme by Charles Bernstein)"	2:07
8.	"Delivery Room (Birth)"	1:44
9.	"Crash / You Are Pregnant"	1:55
10.	"Jacob / Greta's Room"	1:31
11.	"Greta's Room Reprise"	1:25
12.	"Mark's World Continued / Jacob Wait / Resolute Mark (1:25)" ("Mark's World Continued" was based from the original A Nightmare on Elm Street Theme by Charles Bernstein)	1:25
13.	"The Womb / Keep The Baby"	1:23
14.	"Greta's Doll"	1:00
15.	"Yvonne Goes To The Asylum"	2:22

These were previously unreleased, until the A Nightmare On Elm Street - 8 CD Box Set.

== Release ==
=== Home media ===
A Nightmare on Elm Street 5: The Dream Child was released on VHS in the United States by Media Home Entertainment in late 1989, followed by a LaserDisc edition in 1990. Uncut versions containing additional footage from the film's more graphic death sequences were available on the early home-video formats.

Subsequent DVD and Blu-ray editions generally contained the shorter R-rated theatrical version. On 30 September 2025, Warner Bros. Home Entertainment released the film as part of a seven-film A Nightmare on Elm Street Ultra HD Blu-ray collection, which included both the theatrical and previously unavailable-on-disc uncut versions. A comparison published by Movie-Censorship.com confirmed the reinstatement of footage removed from Dan's and Greta's death sequences to obtain the original theatrical rating.

== Reception ==
=== Box office ===
A Nightmare on Elm Street 5: The Dream Child was released on August 11, 1989, in 1,902 theaters in North America. On the first weekend, the film opened $8.1 million, falling behind Parenthood ($9.7 million) and James Cameron's The Abyss ($9.3 million). The film ranked eighth at the second-weekend box office, with a revenue of $3.6 million, and it dropped out of the Top 10 list ranked at eleventh and fourteenth on the third and the fourth weekends, respectively. Overall, the film grossed $22.1 million at U.S. box office.

It is the highest grossing slasher film released in 1989. It is currently the second-lowest-grossing Nightmare on Elm Street film. The film ranked number forty-three of the Top 50 Highest-grossing Films released in the U.S. in 1989 and is thirty-seventh of all slasher films cataloged by Box Office Mojo.

=== Critical response ===
The review aggregator website Rotten Tomatoes reports a 32% approval rating and an average rating of 4.2/10 based on 38 reviews. The site's consensus is: "A Nightmare on Elm Street feels exhausted by this cheesy fifth entry, bogged down by a convoluted mythology while showing none of the chilling technique that kicked off the franchise." On Metacritic the film has a weighted average score of 54 out of 100, based on 11 critics, indicating "mixed or average" reviews.

Caryn James of The New York Times wrote that the film "doesn't pretend to be anything more than it is – a genre film that won't totally insult your intelligence or your eyes". Variety called it "a poorly constructed special effects showcase" with "highly variable" acting, but praised the special effects, stating that "saving grace is the series of spectacular special effects set pieces featuring fanciful makeup, mattes, stopmotion animation and opticals". Dave Kehr of the Chicago Tribune praised the Stephen Hopkins' direction, stating, "Using a style heavily indebted to music videos - lots of fast cutting, odd angles and gratuitous camera movements - Hopkins keeps the energy level up, though his manner is a bit too choppy to keep all of the diverse elements together." Kevin Thomas of the Los Angeles Times described it as "a dynamic, fully visually realized experience", complimenting the acting, set design, and directing. Thomas identifies Krueger as representing the irrational adult world to teenagers. Richard Harrington of The Washington Post ranked it below the first and third films, saying the plot is too confusing.

In 2016, Robert Englund recollected the experience working with Hopkins, "I met Stephen Hopkins, who's like the handsomest man in Hollywood, at a Thai restaurant in Culver City. Stephen was doing storyboards and he's such a great illustrator that I just said, 'Take me now.' He goes, 'I want this whole sequence to be like M. C. Escher.' I went 'Oh, perfect for a dream sequence, I get it.' That's all he had to say to me and show me his doodle on a napkin, and I was hooked." In the same interview, he also praised the special effects and experience when shooting the film, "My best time on that was the sequence in the insane asylum. That was fun because that was my first time with the floating crane camera. There's no crew. It was just me and 100 extras, and this little teeny camera. It was like having a drone on a little wiry crane ... and there's a lot of wide shots in that magnificent set."

In a 1990 interview promoting the film Predator 2, Hopkins expressed disappointment with the final product, stating that, "It was a rushed schedule without a reasonable budget and after I finished it, New Line and the MPAA came in and cut the guts out of it completely. What started out as an OK film with a few good bits turned into a total embarrassment. I can't even watch it anymore."

=== Accolades ===
1990 Fantasporto Awards
Critics Award – Stephen Hopkins (Won)
International Fantasy Film Award Best Film – Stephen Hopkins (Nomination)

10th Golden Raspberry Awards
Razzie Award for Worst Original Song – Bruce Dickinson for "Bring Your Daughter... to the Slaughter" (Won)
Razzie Award for Worst Original Song – Kool Moe Dee for "Let's Go" (Nominated)

1990 Young Artist Awards
Best Young Actor in a Supporting Role – Whit Hertford (Won)

== See also ==
- List of ghost films
- List of monster films
