= Monty Byrom =

American musician and song-writer

- Born: 1958; Corpus Christi, Texas, U.S.
- Genres: Rock, Americana, Country, Album oriented rock
- Occupations: songwriter, singer, musician, producer
- Instruments: guitar, keyboards
- Member of: The Byrom Brothers
- Formerly of: Billy Satellite; New Frontier; Big House; The Buckaroos; Zen Road Pilots; Monty Byrom & the Road Pilots

Monty Byrom (born 1958) is an American rock, blues and country guitarist, singer, songwriter and producer. He fronted the rock band Billy Satellite, co-writing several songs for the band that later became hits for Eddie Money. Byrom later became more involved in collaborations with Money, writing or co-writing songs on future Money albums and touring with Money on occasion. Later while leading the "soul country" band Big House, Byrom made a significant contribution to the new Bakersfield Sound, with a nod to his Bakersfield roots.

== Early life ==
Byrom was born in Corpus Christi, Texas and raised in Bakersfield, California. His original musical influences were Merle Haggard, Billy Mize, Buck Owens, Otis Redding, and Bobby Womack.

When he was seventeen, he joined the United States Navy. After attending the Norfolk Navy School of Music, he played in the Navy band, performing at high schools and colleges across the United States.

Although Bakersfield had a rising country music scene, he grew to prefer the music of Eric Clapton, Creedence Clearwater Revival, Deep Purple, Jim Hendrix, and Santana. After the Navy, he played in a Bay Area band, The Heaters. In the 1980s, he played with the Dead Family.

== Career ==
=== Billy Satellite ===
In the early 1980s, Byrom was a founding member of the Alameda, California band Billy Satellite. He provided lead vocals and played guitar and keyboards for the Album-oriented rock band. He also co-wrote the band's songs. The band signed with Capitol Records by John S. Carter in 1983. Their album, Billy Satellite, was produced by Don Gehman and recorded at Rumbo Recorders in Los Angeles. The band toured with Night Ranger and Jefferson Starship in support of the album, which yielded two minor hits. Although recorded, the band's second album was never released and they were dropped by Capitol. Billy Satellite broke up shortly afterward.

=== New Frontier ===
After Billy Satellite, Byrom formed the band New Frontier which Glenn Letsch (Gamma) on bass, Marc Nelson on drums, and David Neuhauser on keyboards. The band signed with MIKA Records, an imprint of Polydor Records, and released a self-titled album in 1987. Because all of its members were involved in other bands and projects, this group was short-lived.

=== Eddie Money ===
Byrom began writing songs for Eddie Money after the latter had a hit with a cover of "I Wanna Go Back" by Billy Satellite (co-written by Byrom). Money's version of "I Wanna Go Back" received the ASCAP/BMI Song of the Year Award, based on airplay. He also toured with Money's band for several years.

Byrom was the producer, engineer, and mixer on Money's 1991 album Right Here, along with providing backing vocals and playing guitar and keyboards. He also co-wrote six of the album's ten tracks, including "Another Nice Day in L.A.," "Fall In Love Again," "Fire and Water," "Prove It Every Night," "She Takes My Breath Away," and "Things Are Much Better Today." He also produced and played guitar on Money's 1992 release Unplug It In.

=== Big House ===
Following a gathering of musicians in Bakersfield in the mid-1990s, Byrom founded the country music band, Big House, with David Neuhauser from New Frontier. The duo shared song-writing for the band, and Byrom played guitar and sang lead vocals. Byrom's brother, Tanner, was also a member of Big House, playing the drums. They signed with MCA Nashville and released three albums between 1997 and 2000, including Big House, Travelin' Kind, and Woodstock Nation. Their fourth album, Never Ending Train, was released in 2008. He produced all four of the band's albums. They were nominated for a Academy of Country Music Award for top new vocal duet or group in 1998. They also had four Top 40 Country hits, including "Cold Outside" and "You Ain't Lonely Yet."

=== The Buckaroos ===
After the death of his friend Buck Owens, Byrom was invited to join Owens' band The Buckaroos at The Crystal Palace in Bakersfield, California, fronting the band one weekend a month. Byrom played with The Buckaroos for thirteen years, from 2007 to 2019. Upon leaving the group, he said, 'Thirteen years and time to move on. I'm going to miss those boys and Jennifer [Keel, backing singer], that's for sure. Finally, in the end, it just came down to...time to move on." One of the reasons he quit was because of the increasing success of The Byrom Brothers.

=== Zen Road Pilots ===
In 2012, Byrom formed the Zen Road Pilots with Tom "Fee" Falletti and Ira Walker, former bandmates from Billy Satellite. The band recorded one self-titled album. Changing its name to Monty Byrom and The Road Pilots, this five-piece band played Americana-infused rock and soul in the old-school tradition. They released 100 Miles South of Eden in 2016.

=== The Byrom Brothers ===
The Road Pilots became The Byrom Brothers, which includes his brother and Big House drummer Tanner Byrom. Byrom plays guitar and sings lead vocals. The band also includes studio musician Wil Anderson on bass and keyboardist Chris Neufeld, who was a member of The Road Pilots and also played with Eddie Money. Their current release, an album of covers titled The Age Of Music, was released in 2016.

=== Other ===
In 1984, he provided backing vocals for Barbra Streisand on her album, Emotion. The producer of that track was Don Felder (Eagles), who mentored Byrom, leading to other projects with major acts. As a result, Byrom wrote songs that were recorded by Rita Coolidge, Ace Frehley, Beth Hart, The Knack, Gregg Rolie, David Lee Roth, Stray Cats, George Thorogood, Van Halen, Walela, and Waylon.

In 1992, he played guitar and provided backing vocals for Danny Tate's self-named album. He also played guitar on recordings by J'Son, New Frontier, and Kathy Troccoli. In addition, he produced and played instruments on albums for Jay Boy Adams, Jared Tyler, and Ted Z & the Wranglers.

He also worked on numerous movie and film soundtracks, including Blackdog, The Kids Are Alright, Made in America, The Slugger’s Wife, Secret Admirer, and Sunset Beat.

== Awards and honors ==
- Byrom won The Guitar Wars in northern California.
- "I Wanna Go Back," a song he co-wrote, won the ASCAP/BMI Song of the Year Award.
