= Political views of Christopher Hitchens =

Views of political commentator (1949–2011)

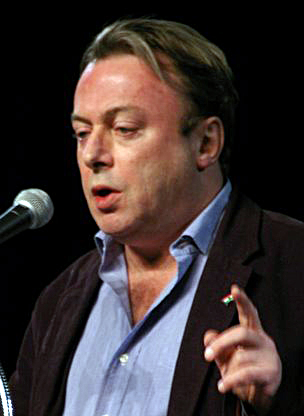
Hitchens, wearing a Kurdish flag pin (just behind his left index finger), speaking at the 2007 Amaz!ng Meeting at the Riviera Hotel, Las Vegas

Christopher Hitchens (13 April 1949 – 15 December 2011) was a British and American author, polemicist, debater and journalist who in his youth took part in demonstrations against the Vietnam War, joined organisations such as the International Socialists while at university and began to identify as a socialist. However, after 9/11 he no longer regarded himself as a socialist and his political thinking became largely dominated by the issue of defending civilization from terrorists and against the totalitarian regimes that protect them. Hitchens nonetheless continued to identify as a Marxist, endorsing the materialist conception of history, but believed that Karl Marx had underestimated the revolutionary nature of capitalism. He sympathized with libertarian ideals of limited state interference, but considered libertarianism not to be a viable system. In the 2000 U.S. presidential election, he supported the Green Party candidate Ralph Nader. After 9/11, Hitchens advocated for the invasion of Iraq. In the 2004 election, he very slightly favored the incumbent Republican President George W. Bush or was neutral and in 2008 he favored the Democratic candidate Barack Obama over John McCain despite being critical of both of them.

== Political orientation ==
=== First principles ===
Alexander Linklater has summarized Hitchens' basic intellectual outlook as follows:

One of [Hitchens'] old strongholds [was] the 17th-century contest between king and parliament of the English Civil War. For Hitchens, the Cromwellian revolt represents not just the foundational struggle for parliamentary rule, but the great rejection of divine right. ... But he is no optimistic Enlightenment rationalist. He identifies himself with Thomas Paine's disillusion at the French terror, and Rosa Luxemburg's famous warning to Lenin about the inexorability of one-man rule. He retains, however, from his Marxist youth an intellectual absolutism and a disdain for liberal dilemmas and trade-offs – hence a brutal assault on Isaiah Berlin's genteel liberalism in a 1998 essay. He is incurious about what religious belief feels like, or what meaning it has for millions of people – even though, unlike his co-anti-religionist Richard Dawkins, Hitchens concedes that religious feeling is ineradicable.

=== British republicanism ===
Hitchens was a vocal supporter of republicanism in the United Kingdom, advocating the abolition of the monarchy, and in 1990 published the book-long polemic The Monarchy: A Critique of Britain's Favourite Fetish. His 1998 documentary Princess Diana: The Mourning After accused the British media of playing an essential role in creating a national, unchallengeable, and at times hysterical cult of personality surrounding the death of Diana, Princess of Wales, whereas previously they had been extremely critical of her and the monarchy after she had separated and divorced from Charles, Prince of Wales, and was having an affair with Egyptian billionaire Dodi Fayed. Hitchens claimed the public were behaving irrationally, and that many appeared to not even know why they were mourning. He also scrutinised the level of censorship against criticism of Diana and the monarchy but was accused, in a review by The Independent, of exaggerating on this point.

=== Labour Party ===
In 1965, Hitchens joined the Labour Party on the very first day he was eligible to vote, but along with the majority of the Labour students' organization was expelled in 1967, because of what Hitchens called "Prime Minister Harold Wilson's contemptible support for the war in Vietnam". Since then he stated he had "re-enlisted a few times" back into the Labour Party. In a 2001 interview with Reason, he said that, in 1979, despite being a member of the Labour Party, he wasn't going to vote for them, nor could he bring himself to "vote Conservative." He abstained from voting. Hitchens stated that by not voting for the Labour Party he was effectively voting for Margaret Thatcher to win, which he said he had "secretly hoped would happen." In a 2005 Vanity Fair article, he endorsed Tony Blair in the 2005 general election, mainly due to his support for the 2003 invasion of Iraq. In a 2009 Slate article, he described that in the late 1970s the Labour Party moved to the right and stated that the downfall of the Labour Party came about upon Gordon Brown's becoming Prime Minister.

=== European Union ===
Hitchens was a supporter of the European Union. In an appearance on C-SPAN in 1993, Hitchens said, "As of 1992, there is a now a Euro passport that makes you free to travel within the boundaries of... member countries, and I've always liked the idea of European unity, and so I held out for a Euro passport. So I travel as a European."

Speaking at the launch of his brother Peter Hitchens' book, The Abolition of Britain at Conway Hall in London, Hitchens denounced the so-called Eurosceptic movement, describing it as "the British version of fascism". He went on to say, "Scepticism is a title of honour. These people are not sceptical. They're fanatical. They're dogmatic".

=== Northern Ireland ===
During a debate with George Galloway in 2005, Hitchens revealed that he was "a lifelong supporter of the reunification of Ireland". Many times, when discussing "the Troubles" in Northern Ireland, Hitchens would refer to their location as simply "Ireland", rather than "Northern Ireland", as for example in an article written for Slate in 2007, discussing the power-sharing and devolved government in Northern Ireland and describing it as "an agreement to divide the spoils of Ireland's six northeastern counties". During the IRA bombing campaigns on Great Britain, which began in the 1970s, Hitchens claimed that he had "kept two sets of books: I didn't like bombs, I didn't like the partition of Ireland."

=== Libertarianism and capitalism ===
In a 2001 interview with Reason, Hitchens said he had been interested in libertarian ideas when he was younger, but set aside those interests in the 1960s. He stated that capitalism had become the more revolutionary economic system, and he welcomed globalisation as "innovative and internationalist", but added, "I don't think that the contradictions, as we used to say, of the system, are by any means all resolved." He also stated that he had a renewed interest in the freedom of the individual from the state, but that he still considered libertarianism "ahistorical" both on the world stage and in the work of creating a stable and functional society, adding that libertarians are "more worried about the over-mighty state than the unaccountable corporation" whereas "the present state of affairs ... combines the worst of bureaucracy with the worst of the insurance companies." He also said that libertarians did not have a clear foreign policy stance.

In a 2001 C-SPAN appearance, he told a caller:

If you are a libertarian you may find some nourishment in my book Letters to a Young Contrarian where I say that in the same breath as I-as I mourn the decay of some of my socialist allegiances that deep down I've always been a sympathizer of the libertarian anti-statist point of view. And one of the things that attracted me to socialism in the beginning was the idea of withering away of the state.

In a 1986 video debate on Socialism vs Capitalism with John Judis VS Harry Binswanger and John Ridpath, Hitchens said:

"…capitalism as a system has coexisted with and in on occasion sponsored feudalism, monarchy, fascism, slavery, apartheid, and under development. It has also been the great engine of progress, development and innovation in a certain few heartland countries. This means that it must be a system studied as a system and not as an idea. Its claims to be the sponsor of freedom are purely contingent. It's good propaganda but it's not very good political science…"

=== Objectivism ===
Hitchens said of Objectivism, "I have always found it quaint, and rather touching, that there is a movement in the US that thinks Americans are not yet selfish enough".

=== Marxism and socialism ===
In a 2001 interview with Reason, Hitchens said he became a Marxist and a Trotskyist in his teens, beliefs that further developed during his time at Balliol College, Oxford. In 1966, he was demonstrating in Trafalgar Square against the Vietnam War. In 1967, he joined the International Socialists while at Balliol College, Oxford. Under the influence of Peter Sedgwick, who translated the writings of Russian revolutionary and Soviet dissident Victor Serge, Hitchens forged an ideological interest in Trotskyist and anti-Stalinist socialism. Shortly after he joined "a small but growing post-Trotskyist Luxemburgist sect". This organisation is now known as the Alliance for Workers' Liberty. He became a socialist "largely [as] the outcome of a study of history, taking sides ... in the battles over industrialism and war and empire." He was also drawn into the political left by his anger over the Vietnam War, nuclear weapons, racism and "oligarchy", including that of "the unaccountable corporation." He also said in the same interview with Reason that he could no longer say "I am a socialist". Socialists, he claimed, had ceased to offer a positive alternative to the capitalist system.

In a June 2010 interview with The New York Times, he stated that "I still think like a Marxist in many ways. I think the materialist conception of history is valid. I consider myself a very conservative Marxist". In 2009, in an article for The Atlantic entitled "The Revenge of Karl Marx", Hitchens frames the late-2000s recession in terms of Marx's economic analysis and notes how much Marx admired the capitalist system that he called for the end of, but says that Marx ultimately failed to grasp how revolutionary capitalist innovation was. Hitchens was an admirer of Che Guevara, yet in an essay written in 1997, he distanced himself from Che, and referred to the mythos surrounding him as a "cult". In 2004 he re-emphasized his positive view of Che, commenting that "[Che's] death meant a lot to me and countless like me at the time. He was a role model, albeit an impossible one for us bourgeois romantics insofar as he went and did what revolutionaries were meant to do – fought and died for his beliefs."

He continued to regard Leon Trotsky and Vladimir Lenin as great men, and the October Revolution as a necessary event in the modernisation of Russia. In 2005, Hitchens praised Lenin's creation of "secular Russia" and his attacks on the Russian Orthodox Church, describing the church's power as "absolute warren of backwardness and evil and superstition".

In God is not Great, Hitchens called Marxism his "own secular faith" that "has been shaken and discarded, not without pain." He referred to his period of Marxist faith as "when I was a Marxist."

According to Andrew Sullivan, his last words were "Capitalism, downfall."

=== Views on American presidents ===
==== Bill Clinton ====
Hitchens became increasingly disenchanted by the presidency of Bill Clinton, accusing him of being a rapist, a liar, and war criminal. Hitchens said the missile attacks by Clinton on Sudan constituted a war crime. Hitchens criticized Clinton for his pardon of Marc Rich and others who had donated to Clinton, overseeing the execution of Ricky Ray Rector, his relationships with Monica Lewinsky and Gennifer Flowers.

In 1999, Hitchens became involved in the Impeachment trial of Bill Clinton when Hitchens friend and Clinton adviser Sidney Blumenthal said under oath during a deposition that he had never described Monica Lewinsky as a stalker. In response to Blumenthal's testimony Hitchens submitted a sworn affidavit saying that he had in fact described Lewinsky as a stalker at a lunch with Hitchens and his wife.

==== George W. Bush ====
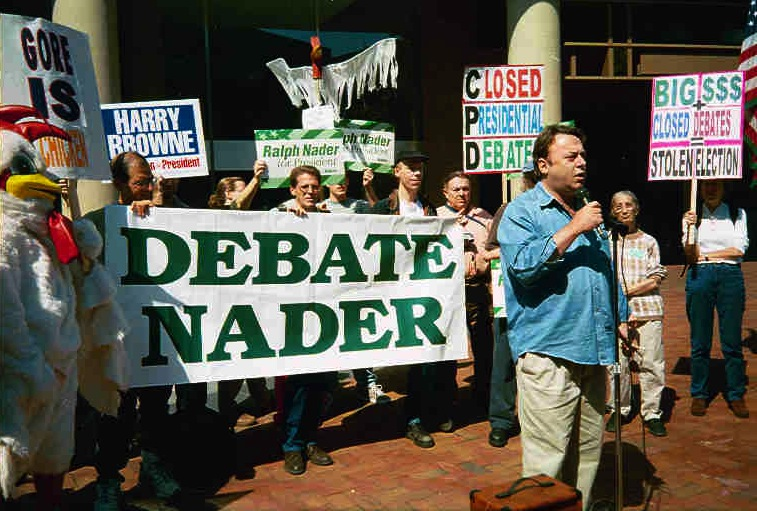
Hitchens speaking at a September 2000 third party protest at the headquarters of the Commission on Presidential Debates

Hitchens supported Ralph Nader in the 2000 US presidential election. He elaborated on his support for Nader in a discussion with Eric Alterman on Bloggingheads.tv, indicating that he was disenchanted with the candidacy of both George W. Bush and Al Gore.

Prior to the September 11 attacks in 2001, and the invasion of Iraq and Afghanistan, Hitchens was critical of President George W. Bush's "non-interventionist" foreign policy. He also criticised Bush's support for intelligent design and capital punishment. Hitchens defended Bush's post-11 September foreign policy, but he also criticised the actions of US troops in Abu Ghraib and Haditha, and the US government's use of waterboarding, which, after voluntarily undergoing it, he argued was definitely torture. After Dick Cheney chief of staff Scooter Libby was found guilty of obstruction of justice and perjury, Hitchens defended Libby and called on Bush to pardon him.

Hitchens supported George W. Bush in the 2004 US presidential election. He made a brief return to The Nation just before the election and wrote that he was "slightly" for Bush; shortly afterwards, Slate polled its staff on their positions on the candidates and mistakenly printed Hitchens' vote as pro-John Kerry. Hitchens shifted his opinion to "neutral", saying: "It's absurd for liberals to talk as if Kristallnacht is impending with Bush, and it's unwise and indecent for Republicans to equate Kerry with capitulation. There's no one to whom he can surrender, is there? I think that the nature of the jihadist enemy will decide things in the end".

In January 2006, Hitchens joined with four other individuals and four organisations, including the American Civil Liberties Union and Greenpeace, as plaintiffs in a lawsuit, ACLU v. NSA, challenging Bush's warrantless domestic spying program; the lawsuit was filed by the ACLU.

==== Barack Obama ====
Hitchens supported Barack Obama in the 2008 presidential election. Hitchens criticized Obama's democratic opponent Hillary Clinton writing in a column for the slate "Indifferent to truth, willing to use police-state tactics and vulgar libels against inconvenient witnesses, hopeless on health care and flippant and fast and loose with national security: the case against Hillary Clinton for president is open-and-shut". In an article for Slate he stated, "I used to call myself a single-issue voter on the essential question of defending civilization against its terrorist enemies and their totalitarian protectors, and on that 'issue' I hope I can continue to expose and oppose any ambiguity." He was critical of both main party candidates, Obama and John McCain, but wrote that Obama would be the better choice. Hitchens went on to call McCain "senile", and his choice of running mate Sarah Palin "absurd", calling Palin a "pathological liar" and a "national disgrace". Hitchens also wrote that "Obama is greatly overrated" and that the Obama-Biden ticket "show[s] some signs of being able and willing to profit from experience".

==== Donald Trump ====
In 1999, Hitchens wrote a profile of future president Donald Trump for The Sunday Herald. Trump had expressed interest in running in the 2000 presidential election as a candidate for the Reform Party. Of Trump, Hitchens said, "Because the man with many monikers in many ways embodies his country and because this election cycle is now so absurd, and so much up for grabs, it is unwise to exclude anything... The best guess has to be that here's a man who hates to be alone, who needs approval and reinforcement, who talks a better game than he plays, who is crude, hyperactive, emotional and optimistic." Hitchens had previously written that Trump demonstrated "nobody is more covetous and greedy than those who have far too much."

=== The American Revolution ===
After his disenchantment with socialism, Hitchens increasingly emphasized the centrality of the American Revolution and the U.S. Constitution to his political philosophy. As early as 2002, Hitchens wrote, "as the third millennium gets under way, and as the Russian and Chinese and Cuban revolutions drop below the horizon, it is possible to argue that the American revolution, with its promise of cosmopolitan democracy, is the only 'model' revolution that humanity has left to it". His enthusiasm for the U.S. Bill of Rights contrasts with a dim opinion of constitutional politics on the other side of the Atlantic. Hitchens notes, "the utter failure [of the EU] to compose a viable constitution" and the "brevity of the British constitution, perhaps because the motherland of the English-speaking peoples has absent-mindedly failed to evolve one in written form".

== Foreign policy ==
=== Bosnian War ===
Hitchens cited the Bosnian War as monumentally changing his views on military intervention, commenting that for the first time he found himself on the side of neoconservatives. In an interview with Johann Hari he said:

That war in the early 1990s changed a lot for me. I never thought I would see, in Europe, a full-dress reprise of internment camps, the mass murder of civilians, the reinstiutution [sic] of torture and rape as acts of policy. And I didn't expect so many of my comrades to be indifferent – or even take the side of the fascists. It was a time when many people on the left were saying 'Don't intervene, we'll only make things worse' or, 'Don't intervene, it might destabilise the region. And I thought – destabilisation of fascist regimes is a good thing. Why should the left care about the stability of undemocratic regimes? Wasn't it a good thing to destabilise the regime of General Franco? It was a time when the left was mostly taking the conservative, status quo position – leave the Balkans alone, leave Milošević alone, do nothing. And that kind of conservatism can easily mutate into actual support for the aggressors. Weimar-style conservatism can easily mutate into National Socialism. So you had people like Noam Chomsky's co-author Ed Herman go from saying 'Do nothing in the Balkans', to actually supporting Milošević, the most reactionary force in the region. That's when I began to first find myself on the same side as the neocons. I was signing petitions in favour of action in Bosnia, and I would look down the list of names and I kept finding, there's Richard Perle. There's Paul Wolfowitz. That seemed interesting to me. These people were saying that we had to act. Before, I had avoided them like the plague, especially because of what they said about General Sharon and about Nicaragua. But nobody could say they were interested in oil in the Balkans, or in strategic needs, and the people who tried to say that – like Chomsky – looked ridiculous. So now I was interested.

Hitchens argued that the choice in Yugoslavia was between a multi-ethnic plural democracy led by Muslim president Alija Izetbegović in Bosnia and a fascistic, nationalistically inspired ethnically cleansed state driven by Serbian leader Slobodan Milošević. He called Milošević a fascist and a "national-socialist", and condemned his war crimes in the Yugoslav Wars. In God Is Not Great, he wrote about Christian Orthodox Serbian and Roman Catholic Croatian nationalism- and religion-inspired crimes against the Muslim Bosniaks, at the hands of proponents of Serbian Chetnik revivalism, those in support of Croatian Ustashe revivalism and those for a Greater Serbia, during this period which are "often forgotten".

In effect, the extremist Catholic and Orthodox forces were colluding in a bloody partition and cleansing of Bosnia-Herzegovina. They were, and still are, largely spared the public shame of this, because the world's media preferred the simplification of "Croat" and "Serb," and only mentioned religion when discussing "the Muslims." But the triad of terms "Croat," "Serb," and "Muslim" is unequal and misleading, in that it equates two nationalities and one religion. (The same blunder is made in a different way in coverage of Iraq, with the "Sunni-Shia-Kurd" trilateral.)

=== Kosovo War ===
Hitchens heavily supported western military intervention in Kosovo. He deplored Slobodan Milošević's regime since the beginning of the Yugoslav Wars and the atrocities committed in Bosnia and later in Kosovo. Hitchens saw Milošević and his nationalism as the prime catalyst for the break-up of Yugoslavia. He also highlighted the hypocrisy of Milošević's regime in their concern about the Serb minorities in Croatia and Bosnia while at the same time suppressing autonomy for the 90% of Albanians in Kosovo.

Someone with a good memory of the conversation once told me how Lord Carrington, then one of the "mediators" of the incipient post-Yugoslavia war, came to the conclusion that Slobodan Milosevic was a highly dangerous man. Well-disposed toward Serbia (as the British establishment has always been), Carrington told the late dictator that he understood Serb concerns about significant Serbian minorities in Bosnia and Croatia. But why did Milosevic also insist on exclusive control over Kosovo, where the Albanian population was approximately 90 percent? "That," replied Milosevic coldly, "is for historical reasons." It's a shame, in retrospect, that it took us so long to diagnose the pathology of Serbia's combination of arrogance and self-pity, in which what is theirs is theirs and what is anybody else's is negotiable.

After the war, Hitchens supported Kosovo's independence and criticized the burning of the US Embassy in Belgrade as a response to it:

We used to read this same atavistic proclamation by the hellish light of burning Sarajevo, and now we glimpse it again through the flames of the blazing U.S. Embassy in Belgrade, and by the glare of similar but less dramatic arsons set by Serbs in ski masks in northern Kosovo itself. But it needs to be understood that "Serbia" itself has lost nothing and has nothing to complain about. With the independence of Kosovo, the Yugoslav idea is finally and completely dead, but it was Serbian irredentism that killed the last vestige of that idea, and it is to that account that the whole cost ought to be charged. Forget all the nonsense that you may have heard about Kosovo being "the Jerusalem" of Serbia. It may contain some beautiful and ancient Serbian and Serbian Orthodox cultural sites, but it is much more like Serbia's West Bank or Gaza, with a sweltering, penned-up, subject population who were for generations treated as if they were human refuse in the land of their own birth. Nobody who has spent any time in the territory, as I did during and after the eviction of the Serb militias, can believe for a single second that any Kosovar would ever again submit to rule from Belgrade. It's over.

=== Gulf War ===
Hitchens deplored and opposed the 1990–91 Gulf War in which the US expelled Iraq from Kuwait after a seven-month invasion and occupation of its neighbor undertaken in an effort to absorb it as its 19th province. He contended that President George H. W. Bush's supposedly principled enthusiasm for the "cause" of "liberating" Kuwait was nothing more than realpolitik. In the continuation of a national policy dating back to Henry Kissinger and Richard Nixon in 1972, the latest "cause was yet another move in the policy of keeping a region divided and embittered, and therefore accessible to the franchisers of weaponry and the owners of black gold".

However, after the war, Hitchens scolded those within the US who had opposed the war by observing that "the peace movement in this country in my opinion acted in a very narrow, isolationist, and almost chauvinistic way. It said that a war was more or less alright with it as long as it could be guaranteed in advance that American casualties could be kept low... I thought that was a dishonourably narrow way of approaching the question. ... When large numbers of Iraqis were turned into soap...and many others, as we've since found out, were bulldozed and buried alive and in other ways done away with and people don't even want to think about the body count ...because they're afraid of what they might find out."

=== Israeli−Palestinian conflict ===
Hitchens described Zionism as "an ethno-nationalist quasi-religious ideology" but argued that Zionism "nonetheless has founded a sort of democratic state which isn't any worse in its practice than many others with equally dubious origins." He stated that Israeli settlements on Palestinian territory to achieve security for Israel are "doomed to fail in the worst possible way", and the cessation of this "appallingly racist and messianic delusion" would "confront the internal clerical and chauvinist forces which want to instate a theocracy for Jews". Hitchens contended that the "solution of withdrawal would not satisfy the jihadists" and wondered "What did they imagine would be the response of the followers of the Prophet [Muhammad]?"

Hitchens bemoaned the transference of Arab secularism into religious terrorism as a means of democratisation: "the most depressing and wretched spectacle of the past decade, for all those who care about democracy and secularism, has been the degeneration of Palestinian Arab nationalism into the theocratic and thanatocratic hell of Hamas and Islamic Jihad".

On 14 November 2004, Hitchens noted:

Edward Said asked many times, in public and private, where the Mandela of Palestine could be. In rather bold contrast to this decent imagination, Arafat managed to be both a killer and a compromiser (Mandela was neither), both a Swiss bank account artist and a populist ranter (Mandela was neither), both an Islamic "martyrdom" blow-hard and a servile opportunist, and a man who managed to establish a dictatorship over his own people before they even had a state (here one simply refuses to mention Mandela in the same breath).

Hitchens had previously collaborated on this issue with Edward Said, publishing the 1988 book Blaming the Victims: Spurious Scholarship and the Palestinian Question.

Hitchens had said of himself, "I am an Anti-Zionist. I'm one of those people of Jewish descent who believes that Zionism would be a mistake even if there were no Palestinians." and "If Jews born in Brooklyn have a right to a state in Palestine, then Palestinians born in Jerusalem have a right to a state in Palestine. Anyone who doesn't agree with that principle I think is suspect."

A review of his autobiography Hitch-22 in The Jewish Daily Forward refers to Hitchens "at the time [that he had learned that his grandparents were Jews, he had been] a prominent anti-Zionist" and says that he viewed Zionism "as an injustice against the Palestinians". Others have commented on his anti-Zionism as well. At other times - for example, speaking at 2nd annual Memorial for Daniel Pearl, and in print in an article for The Atlantic - he had made comments against the terrorism against Jews in the Middle East. Hitchens stated "But the Jews of the Arab lands were expelled again in revenge for the defeat of Palestinian nationalistic aspirations, in 1947–48, and now the absolute most evil and discredited fabrication of Jew-baiting Christian Europe – The Protocols of the Elders of Zion – is eagerly promulgated in the Hamas charter and on the group's Web site and recycled through a whole nexus of outlets that includes schools as well as state-run television stations".

In Slate magazine, Hitchens pondered the notion that, instead of curing antisemitism through the creation of a Jewish state, "Zionism has only replaced and repositioned" it, saying: "there are three groups of 6 million Jews. The first 6 million live in what the Zionist movement used to call Palestine. The second 6 million live in the United States. The third 6 million are distributed mainly among Russia, France, Britain, and Argentina. Only the first group lives daily in range of missiles that can be (and are) launched by people who hate Jews." Hitchens argued that instead of supporting Zionism, Jews should help "secularise and reform their own societies", believing that unless one is religious, "what the hell are you doing in the greater Jerusalem area in the first place?" Hitchens said that the only justification for Zionism given by Jews is a religious one.

=== Kurdistan ===
Hitchens was a longtime observer of Saddam Hussein's regime, and publicly called for his removal, albeit only beginning in 1998. This led him to support the establishment of a self-governing state for the Kurds with political autonomy, if not full independence.

During the many years I spent on the Left, the cause of self-determination for Kurdistan was high on the list of principles and priorities – there are many more Kurds than there are Palestinians and they have been staunch fighters for democracy in the region.

He also wore a lapel pin with the flag of Kurdistan on it, to show his solidarity with the Kurds.

=== War on terror ===
==== 11 September attacks ====
In the months following the 9/11 attacks, Hitchens and Noam Chomsky debated the nature of radical Islam and the proper response to it in a highly charged exchange of letters in The Nation, including discussion of whether any comparison could be legitimately made between the 9/11 attacks and the 1998 Al Shifa bombing by the U.S. Approximately a year after the 9/11 attacks and his exchanges with Chomsky, Hitchens left The Nation, claiming that its editors, readers and contributors considered John Ashcroft a bigger threat than Osama bin Laden, and were making excuses on behalf of Islamist terrorism; in the following months he wrote articles increasingly at odds with his former colleagues.

==== War in Afghanistan ====
Hitchens strongly supported US military actions in Afghanistan, particularly in his "Fighting Words" columns in Slate.

==== Iraq War ====
Hitchens employed the term "Islamofascist" and supported the Iraq War, causing his critics to consider him a "neoconservative". Hitchens, however, refused to embrace this designation, insisting, "I'm not any kind of conservative". In 2004, Hitchens stated that neoconservative support for US intervention in Iraq convinced him that he was "on the same side as the neo-conservatives" when it came to contemporary foreign policy issues, and characterized himself as an unqualified "supporter of Paul Wolfowitz." He referred to his associations as "temporary neocon allies". In this period he opined that "the Bush administration [...] has redefined the lazy term 'conservative' to mean someone who is impatient with the status quo."

In the years after the fatwa issued against Salman Rushdie in response to his novel The Satanic Verses, Hitchens became increasingly critical of what he called "excuse making" on the left. At the same time, he was attracted to the foreign policy ideas of some on the Republican-right that promoted pro-liberalism intervention, especially the neoconservative group that included Paul Wolfowitz. Around this time, he befriended the Iraqi dissident and businessman Ahmed Chalabi.

Hitchens argued the case for the Iraq War in a 2003 collection of essays entitled A Long Short War: The Postponed Liberation of Iraq, and participated in public debates on the topic with George Galloway, Scott Ritter, and his brother Peter Hitchens. In its obituary of Hitchens, The Economist wrote that, "on the most consequential political issue of the last decade of his life, the bullshit got him."

==== Human rights violations at Abu Ghraib and Haditha ====
Hitchens criticised human rights abuses by US forces in Iraq but argued that conditions had improved considerably compared either to Saddam Hussein's previous regime or to previous US military actions in Vietnam.

In 2005, Hitchens criticised the abuse of prisoners in Abu Ghraib but argued that overall "prison conditions at Abu Ghraib have improved markedly and dramatically since the arrival of Coalition troops in Baghdad", arguing that "before March 2003, Abu Ghraib was an abattoir, a torture chamber, and a concentration camp."

In a 5 June 2006 article on the alleged killings of Iraqi civilians by U.S. Marines in Haditha, Hitchens argued that whether or not a massacre had taken place, comparisons with the My Lai massacre in Vietnam were "so much propaganda and hot air" that ignored substantial changes in the rules of engagement and US Army procedures and training designed to prevent and discourage such an event. He argued that lesson had been learned such that "as a consequence, a training film about My Lai – "if anything like this happens, you have really, truly screwed up" – has been in use for U. S. soldiers for some time".

==== Pre-war American and British Intelligence ====
In a variety of articles and interviews, Hitchens asserted that British intelligence was correct in claiming that Saddam had attempted to buy uranium from Niger, and that US envoy Joseph Wilson had been dishonest in his public denials of it. He also pointed to discovered munitions in Iraq that violated U. N. Security Council Resolutions 686 and 687, the cease-fire agreements ending the 1991 Iraq-Kuwait conflict.

On 19 March 2007, Hitchens asked himself whether Western intelligence sources should have known that Iraq had 'no stockpiles of weapons of mass destruction.' In his response, Hitchens stated that:

The entire record of UNSCOM until that date had shown a determination on the part of the Iraqi dictatorship to build dummy facilities to deceive inspectors, to refuse to allow scientists to be interviewed without coercion, to conceal chemical and biological deposits, and to search the black market for material that would breach the sanctions. The defection of Saddam Hussein's sons-in-law, the Kamel brothers, had shown that this policy was even more systematic than had even been suspected. Moreover, Iraq did not account for – has in fact never accounted for – a number of the items that it admitted under pressure to possessing after the Kamel defection. We still do not know what happened to this weaponry. This is partly why all Western intelligence agencies, including French and German ones quite uninfluenced by Ahmad Chalabi, believed that Iraq had actual or latent programs for the production of WMD. Would it have been preferable to accept Saddam Hussein's word for it and to allow him the chance to re-equip once more once the sanctions had further decayed?

==== Saddam Hussein ====
In July 2007, the New Statesman printed selected portions of a 1976 piece by Hitchens which they claimed "took a more admiring view of the Iraqi dictator" than his later strong support for ousting Saddam Hussein. In this Hitchens pointed to Iraq's military strength, oil reserves and young leadership to argue that Iraq was "a force to be reckoned with" and described Saddam Hussein as a leader "who has sprung from being an underground revolutionary gunman to perhaps the first visionary Arab statesman since Nasser." He also argued:

Iraq, which has this dynamic combination and much else besides, has not until recently been very much regarded as a power. But with the new discussions in OPEC, the ending of the Kurdistan war and the new round of fighting in Lebanon, its political voice is being heard more and more. The Baghdad regime is the first oil-producing government to opt for 100-per-cent nationalisation, a process completed with the acquisition of foreign assets in Basrah last December. It was the first to call for the use of oil as a political weapon against Israel and her backers. It gives strong economic and political support to the 'Rejection Front' Palestinians who oppose Arafat's conciliation and are currently trying to outface the Syrians in Beirut.

He argued that the means through which the Baathist regime rose to power were similar to that of Iran: having crushed any political dissent and notions of an independent Kurdish state. He stated that the Ba'ath party "point to efforts made by the party press to stimulate criticism of revolutionary shortcomings" but that these "fall rather short of permitting any organised opposition". He claimed that Iraq defended this by claiming "that the country is surrounded by enemies and attacked by imperialist intrigue" but that this had led to the repression of Kurdish nationalists.

==== Waterboarding ====
Hitchens was asked by Vanity Fair to experience waterboarding for himself at a U.S. Army training facility. In May 2008, Hitchens voluntarily underwent the procedure. Hitchens stopped the procedure after 11 seconds and subsequently endorsed the view that it was "torture." He concluded, "If waterboarding does not constitute torture, then there is no such thing as torture."

=== Lebanon ===
Hitchens described Lebanon as "the most plural society in the region" and criticized the Syrian regime for continuing to manipulate the country by proxies and by surrogates notably Hezbollah and the SSNP.

In an article written on Slate, Hitchens stated:

In Greek legend there was a fighter named Antaeus who drew strength from the earth even when he was flung down. It took Hercules to work out his vulnerability as a wrestler. Hezbollah loves death, thrives on defeat and disaster, and is rapidly moving from being a state within a state to becoming the master of what was once the most cosmopolitan and democratic country in the Middle East. Meanwhile, a former superpower – no Hercules – is permitting itself to be made a hostage and laughing-stock by a squalid factional fight within the Israeli right wing involving the time and scale of petty land theft by zealots and fanatics. Only a few years from now, this, too, will seem hard to believe, as well as shameful and unpardonable.

=== India ===
Hitchens wrote on India across multiple decades, addressing Hindu nationalism, the legacy of Gandhi, religious violence, and the country's relationship with Pakistan.

Writing for Vanity Fair from Amritsar in August 1997, Hitchens condemned the 1992 demolition of the Babri Masjid in Ayodhya as "a crowning disgrace," and characterised the growing Hindu nationalist movement in India as "quasi-fascist" and "semi-criminal."

In God Is Not Great (2007), Hitchens used Bombay (now Mumbai) as a case study of how religion fuels communal violence, listing it alongside Belfast, Beirut, Belgrade, Bethlehem, and Baghdad. In Chapter 14, titled "There Is No 'Eastern' Solution," he argued that Hinduism and Buddhism were equally vulnerable to irrationality and violence as the Abrahamic religions, rejecting the notion of an enlightened "Eastern" alternative to Western religion.

In a 2011 essay for The Atlantic titled "The Real Mahatma Gandhi," written as a review of Joseph Lelyveld's biography Great Soul, Hitchens critically re-examined Gandhi's legacy. He questioned the universality of Gandhi's doctrine of nonviolence, citing Gandhi's letters to Adolf Hitler during World War II in which Gandhi urged the application of satyagraha against the Nazi regime. Hitchens argued that Gandhi's religious and ascetic worldview was fundamentally incompatible with secular and democratic politics.

Following the November 2008 terrorist attacks in Mumbai, Hitchens argued in a radio interview with Hugh Hewitt that Pakistan's Inter-Services Intelligence (ISI) bore substantial responsibility for the attacks and pressed for the United States to realign its South Asia policy away from Pakistan and more firmly toward India. He stated that Pakistan had used militant groups as proxies "to colonize Afghanistan" and to apply "strategic depth against India in Kashmir," and described Pakistan as a "rogue, failed state."

== Domestic policy ==
=== Civil liberties ===
==== Abortion ====
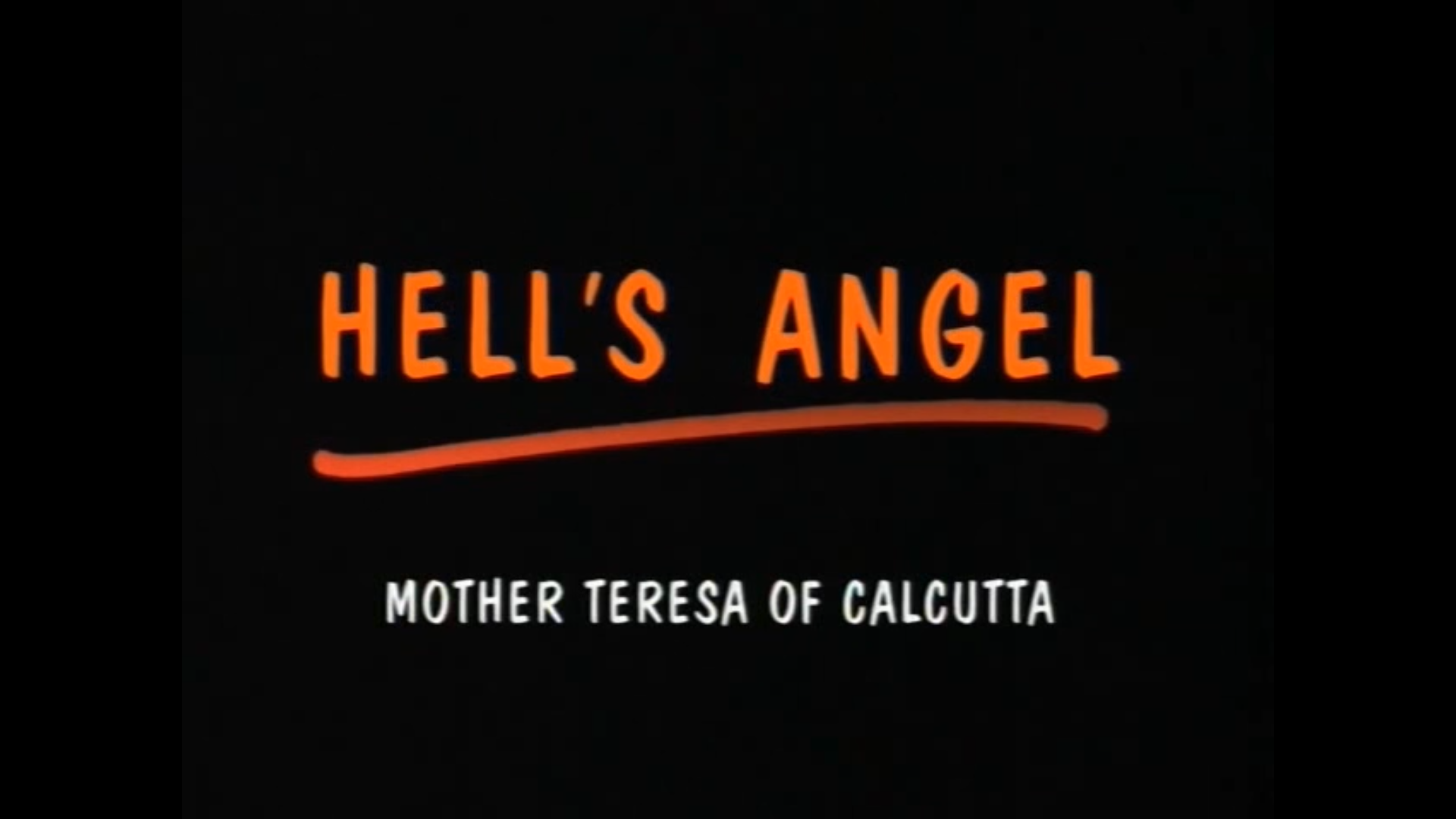
Titlecard of Hell's Angel – Mother Teresa of Calcutta (1994), a documentary by Christopher Hitchens

Hitchens stated, "[an] unborn child seems to me to be a real concept. It's not a growth or an appendix. You can't say the rights question doesn't come up. I don't think a woman should be forced to choose, or even can be", and, "as a materialist, I think it has been demonstrated that an embryo is a separate body and entity". Showing a desire to recognise the unborn as a life, he also affirmed a need for the right to abortion, stating, "the second-best fallback solution, which may sometimes be desirable for other reasons, is termination of pregnancy... all thinking people recognise a painful conflict of rights and interest in this question".

Hitchens opposed an overturning of Roe v. Wade and instead hoped for science to develop new solutions to unwanted pregnancies "that will make abortion more like a contraceptive procedure than a surgical one." He strongly criticized the encouragement of sexual abstinence within the anti-abortion movement of the Christian right, and the equating of contraceptives to abortion, as expressed by Mother Teresa and representatives of the Roman Catholic Church.

==== Capital punishment ====
Hitchens was a lifelong opponent of capital punishment. In a 2001 interview with Reason, Hitchens recalled that this was the very first issue on which he ever decided to take a stand in his youth. The reason for his opposition to capital punishment was that it gave too much power to the government. He later publicly opposed use of the death penalty for Saddam Hussein, an issue he discussed at length in his November 2006 essay "Don't Hang Saddam" for Slate.

==== Drug policy ====
Hitchens has called for the abolition of the "war on drugs," which he described as an "authoritarian war" during a debate with William F. Buckley. Hitchens favored the legalization of cannabis for both recreational and medicinal purposes, and said, "Marijuana is a medicine. I have heard and read convincing arguments and had convincing testimony from real people who say that marijuana is a very useful medicine for the treatment of chemotherapy-induced nausea and for glaucoma. To keep that out of the reach of the sick, it seems to me, is sadistic".

==== Gun rights ====
Hitchens was described by The Atlantic as pro gun. Hitchens philosophically supported gun rights and was generally opposed to gun control. On the subject of the Second Amendment, Hitchens argued that as both an outright ban on guns and relying on a citizen militia for the national defence were equally idealistic and utopian, and that as gun control created a duopoly of force between the state and criminals, it would be more desirable to encourage training among average citizens so they might develop a better relationship with firearms.

In 2007, after the Virginia Tech shooting, Hitchens expressed little sympathy for the attack calling it a "non-story" and compared it to being as unimportant as a "traffic accident".

==== Sexuality ====
Hitchens was a supporter of gay rights. He opposed sodomy laws and supported same-sex marriage. He argued that the legalization of same-sex marriage was the "socialization of homosexuality" and "demonstrates the spread of conservatism" among the gay community.

==== Circumcision ====
Hitchens was a genital integrity activist, strongly criticizing the tradition of both male circumcision and female genital mutilation. In accordance with his antitheism, Hitchens described the tolerance of metzitzah b'peh—a Jewish tradition of sucking blood from the penis after the removal of the male foreskin—as "another disgusting religious practice".

==== Regulations ====
Hitchens was known for his dislike of Nanny state policies put in place by New York city mayor Michael Bloomberg. On 9 July 2009, Hitchens wrote an article criticizing and mocking New York city regulations including smoking laws, bicycle laws, milk crate laws and other regulations. In the same article Hitchens claimed he had broken the laws he had criticized in the article.

==== Voting rights ====
In March 2005, Hitchens supported further investigation into voting irregularities in Ohio during the 2004 presidential election.

== Religion ==
At the New York Public Library in May 2007, Hitchens debated Al Sharpton on the issue of theism and anti-theism, giving rise to a memorable exchange about Mormonism in particular.

In God is Not Great, Hitchens contended that,

Above all, we are in need of a renewed Enlightenment, which will base itself on the proposition that the proper study of mankind is man and woman [referencing Alexander Pope]. This Enlightenment will not need to depend, like its predecessors, on the heroic breakthroughs of a few gifted and exceptionally courageous people. It is within the compass of the average person. The study of literature and poetry, both for its own sake and for the eternal ethical questions with which it deals, can now easily depose the scrutiny of sacred texts that have been found to be corrupt and confected. The pursuit of unfettered scientific inquiry, and the availability of new findings to masses of people by electronic means, will revolutionize our concepts of research and development. Very importantly, the divorce between the sexual life and fear, and the sexual life and disease, and the sexual life and tyranny, can now at last be attempted, on the sole condition that we banish all religions from the discourse. And all this and more is, for the first time in our history, within the reach if not the grasp of everyone.

Hitchens was accused of "anti-Catholic bigotry" by others, including Brent Bozell and UCLA Law Professor Stephen Bainbridge. When Joe Scarborough on 12 March 2004 asked Hitchens whether he was "consumed with hatred for conservative Catholics", Hitchens responded that he was not and that he just thinks that "all religious belief is sinister and infantile".

In 2005, Hitchens praised Vladimir Lenin's creation of "secular Russia" and his destruction of the Russian Orthodox Church, describing it as "an absolute warren of backwardness and evil and superstition." In an interview with Radar in 2007, Hitchens said that if the Christian right's agenda were implemented in the United States "It wouldn't last very long and would, I hope, lead to civil war, which they will lose, but for which it would be a great pleasure to take part."

On 4 April 2009, Hitchens debated Christian philosopher William Lane Craig at Biola University on the topic "Does God Exist?" before both a live and closed circuit audience of over 15,000.

=== Islamism ===
Hitchens was deeply shocked by 14 February 1989 fatwa against his longtime friend Salman Rushdie. He became increasingly critical of what he called "theocratic fascism" or "fascism with an Islamic face": radical Islamists who supported the fatwa against Rushdie and sought the recreation of the medieval caliphate. In 2007, Hitchens told New York magazine "If you ask specifically what is wrong with Islam, it makes the same mistakes as the preceding religions, but it makes another mistake, which is that it’s unalterable. You notice how liberals keep saying, 'If only Islam would have a Reformation'—it can't have one. It says it can't. It's extremely dangerous in that way".

Hitchens is often credited with coining the term "Islamofascism", but Hitchens himself denied it, attributing its coinage to Malise Ruthven.

In February 2006, Hitchens helped organize a pro-Denmark rally outside the Danish Embassy in Washington, DC, in response to the Jyllands-Posten Muhammad cartoons controversy.

Hitchens has received criticism for his attacks on Islam and has been referred to as Islamophobic. Hitchens has called Islamophobia "A stupid term ... to try and suggest that a foul prejudice lurks behind any misgivings about Islam's infallible "message".

=== Mormonism ===
Hitchens was extremely critical of the doctrinal claims of Mormonism and opposed the candidacy of 2012 Republican presidential candidate Mitt Romney, a practicing Mormon.
