= Harry Hammond =

British street evangelist

Harry John Hammond (28 August 1932 – 16 August 2002) was a British street evangelist whose preaching led to his arrest for a public order offence.

== Arrest and prosecution ==
In a street demonstration in The Square, in Bournemouth on 13 October 2001, Hammond held up a large double-sided sign bearing the words "Jesus Gives Peace, Jesus is Alive, Stop Immorality, Stop Homosexuality, Stop Lesbianism, Jesus is Lord". Some passers-by became angry, and tried to remove the sign; some threw water and soil at Hammond. Two police officers arrived and arrested Hammond, and charged him under section 5 of the Public Order Act 1986. No one in the crowd was charged.

The relevant provisions of the Act state: "(1) A person is guilty of an offence if he ... (b) displays any writing, sign or other visible representation which is threatening, abusive or insulting, within the hearing or sight of a person likely to be caused harassment, alarm or distress thereby …(3) It is a defence for the accused to prove ... (c) that his conduct was reasonable."

In April 2002, a Magistrates court heard that Hammond had travelled by bus to preach with the sign. During the bus journey, the defendant covered the sign with a black plastic bin-liner as he believed the sign might cause a fracas if displayed inside the bus, because of reaction he had previously received because of it. The defendant began preaching, holding the sign upright so that it was clearly visible to passers-by. A group of 30 to 40 young people gathered, arguing and shouting; some people in the crowd were angry while others were distressed and pummelled him. Police officers attended the scene; there was a disagreement as to whether they should protect Hammond or arrest him. One of them spoke to the defendant and asked him to take the sign down and leave the area. The defendant refused saying that he was aware that his sign was insulting because he had had a similar reaction before on another occasion, but that he intended to return the following Saturday to preach with the sign again.

Hammond was convicted, fined £300, and ordered to pay costs of £395. The court ordered the destruction of the placards. Shortly after his trial, Hammond died.

== Posthumous appeal ==
In January 2004, a posthumous appeal (Hammond v Director of Public Prosecutions) on the basis of the Human Rights Act failed. A two-judge panel, Lord Justice May sitting with Mr Justice Harrison, at the High Court in London, was told the sign caused a furore as a group of 30 to 40 people gathered round. Hugh Tomlinson, QC, appearing for Hammond's executors, said: "He (Hammond) was subjected to a number of assaults. Soil was thrown at him and water poured over his head. Someone tried to seize the sign and he was knocked to the ground."

The justices were of the opinion that the words on the sign were insulting and caused distress to persons who were present and that the defendant was aware of that fact. The judges ruled that Hammond's behaviour "went beyond legitimate protest" and that Hammond's right to freedom of expression under section 10 of the European Convention on Human Rights was constrained by a legitimate concern to prevent disorder and that there was a pressing social need for the restriction.

A further appeal to the European Court of Human Rights was dismissed.

== Responses ==
The conservative columnist Peter Hitchens discussed the case in his book A Brief History of Crime. Human rights activist Peter Tatchell, best known for his work with LGBT social movements, offered to testify on Hammond's behalf at the appeal, calling the case "an outrageous assault on civil liberties."
