= The Abolition of Britain =

1999 book by Peter Hitchens

- Cover of The Abolition of Britain, revised UK edition
- Author: Peter Hitchens
- Subject: Politics of the United Kingdom
- Genre: Non-fiction
- Publisher: Quartet Books
- Publication date: 1 August 1999
- Publication place: United Kingdom
- Pages: 362
- ISBN: 0-7043-8117-6
- Followed by: Monday Morning Blues

The Abolition of Britain: From Lady Chatterley to Tony Blair (reissued in 2018 with the subtitle From Winston Churchill to Theresa May; US subtitle: From Winston Churchill to Princess Diana) is the first book by the British conservative journalist Peter Hitchens, published in 1999. It examines a period of perceived moral and cultural reform between the 1960s and New Labour's victory at the 1997 general election. Hitchens asserts that the reforms facilitated vast and radical constitutional change under Tony Blair's new government that amounted to a "slow motion coup d'état". The book was cited by Gillian Bowditch in The Times as being a major modern work to dissect "the decline in British morals and manners over the past 50 years", and identified by Andrew Marr in The Observer as "the most sustained, internally logical and powerful attack on Tony Blair and all his works".

Hitchens's later book The Broken Compass explored the same themes, applied to socio-political events and culture in the 2000s.

== Synopsis ==
The Abolition of Britain is a conservative polemic against the changes in the United Kingdom since the mid-1960s. It contrasts the funerals of Winston Churchill (1965) and Diana, Princess of Wales (1997), using these two related but dissimilar events, three decades apart, to illustrate the enormous cultural changes that took place in the intervening period. His argument is that Britain underwent a "cultural revolution", comparable to that of China in the 1960s. He describes and criticises the growing strength of such forces as multiculturalism, which still had a liberal consensus behind it at the time the book was written. He argues that English schools had largely ceased to teach the history of the country or the literature of Britain's past, criticising the preference for methodology in history teaching.

Other changes gain Hitchens's attention, from the passivity and conformism resulting from the watching of television to the Church of England's rejection of its traditional liturgy and scripture. Sex education, he argues, is a form of propaganda against Christian sexual morality. Again, the sexual revolution brought about by the first contraceptive pills was the result "not of accidental discovery, but of research deliberately pursued by moral revolutionaries". He describes the efforts made to provide respectability for unmarried motherhood, not least the campaign to replace the expression "unmarried mother" with "single parent", thus lumping together those who had children out of wedlock with widowers, widows or deserted wives and husbands, and so deflecting disapproval. Hitchens sees the British establishment as being morally weak in their failure to resist the emerging drug culture, when they could easily have done so in the mid-1960s. He cites as one example the prosecution of Mick Jagger and the subsequent intervention of The Times in Jagger's defence in 1967 ("Who breaks a butterfly on a wheel?") after his (temporary) conviction.

One chapter analyses the use of TV and radio soap operas to spread liberal cultural and moral propaganda, and refers to several instances where this intention has been openly expressed by the editors and authors of such programmes. In another, he attacks the development of "anti-establishment" comedy since the staging of Beyond the Fringe at the Edinburgh Festival in 1960. For Hitchens, the development of television, citing with approval a critical letter by T. S. Eliot to The Times in 1950, was something which should have led to a greater public debate than it did. In particular, Hitchens criticises the easy capture of the Conservative Party by lobbyists for commercial TV, which removed the BBC's monopoly power to defend cultural standards. He argues that the introduction of colour television, which made even the bad programmes look good, greatly increased the influence of TV over the public mind.

He identifies the Labour politician Roy Jenkins as a highly-effective campaigner for "cultural revolution". He describes the Lady Chatterley trial, describing what he calls "myths" about it, and argues that the defence of literary merit, created by the Jenkins-backed Obscene Publications Act 1959, eventually came to be used to allow the publication of books and periodicals which had none at all. He examines Jenkins's use of cross-party alliances and, what he sees as supposed Private Members' Bills, to achieve his programme. These legislative changes had not been mentioned in the 1964 or 1966 election Labour Party manifestos, and Hitchens develops his argument by drawing on proposals Jenkins had made in the last chapter of his short book The Labour Case (1959). He cites warnings made by those who opposed the abolition of capital punishment, and claims that those warnings have largely proved to be correct. For Hitchens this is an example of the political elite working against the desires of the public. Hitchens's view is sustained, in the case of capital punishment, by the historian Dominic Sandbrook, in his history of what he calls the White Heat of the 1960s, using contemporaneous opinion poll data. Hitchens went on to explore this issue in more detail in his book A Brief History of Crime.

"The puzzle is why this country of all countries, free, generous, just, democratic, cultured, honourable in its dealings, should have won the enmity of so many of its own citizens".

— The Abolition of Britain, conclusion

A chapter in The Abolition of Britain on the contrast between the public health policies on lung cancer and the public health policies on AIDS was left out of the first edition of the book, after Hitchens was advised that airing thoughts critical of homosexual acts would bring such criticism on it that it would distract attention from the book's main message. It was reinstated in the paperback and American editions, with an explanatory preface. Hitchens elaborated that the morality of homosexuality itself was tangential to his main argument. He wrote that British society's unwillingness to criticize sexual promiscuity among gay, bisexual, and straight men alike despite the ill after-effects stands in direct hypocritical contrast to government action against drug use. (In this chapter, Hitchens wrote "Welsh secretary Ron Davies and agriculture minister Ron Brown were also revealed to be homosexual"; the agricultural minister at the time was actually Nick Brown. In 2000 the former Scottish MP Ron Brown threatened to sue over this, and Hitchens' publishers apologised for the error.)

Hitchens argues that damaging moral and cultural effects on Britain occurred from the presence of huge numbers of US troops during the Second World War. He also laments the cultural impact of American usage of the English language in Britain itself. For Hitchens, the major failing of Margaret Thatcher's government was the absence of a decidedly conservative stance over cultural and moral matters.

== Critical reception ==
The book received considerable attention in the British media upon its publication, and was also reviewed in a number of US newspapers.

The book's reception in Britain was mixed. In a scathing review in The Guardian, Polly Toynbee mocked it. She noted that the author "evokes the Britain of my own childhood, of the 50s and 60s, with a deadly accurate pen", but because of this factor, the book is "a joyful read for liberals. Most of it is given over to eulogies about the past that have precisely the opposite effect of the one intended". Other British reviewers were more positive in their assessments. Mary Kenny in the Catholic Herald considered it "a series of knowledgeable and perceptive linked essays in the tradition of George Orwell". John Colvin, writing in the New Statesman thought the "barren times" in which we live "have found their ideal chronicler" who "in this clear and uninhibited work, reminds us of the tyranny of the new" and that "it is difficult to contradict his belief that a great nation seems almost to have vanished, its traditions mocked and enfeebled".

In The Spectator, John Redwood wrote that he was "exhilarated" by the book, and that Hitchens had written with "passion and flair". Redwood added that Hitchens was at his best when "exposing the way in which our educational system and cultural standards have been systematically undermined". Also writing in The Spectator, Peregrine Worsthorne was more circumspect: "after eloquently telling the tale of how successive British parliamentary governments, Tory as much as Labour, have 'abolished' old Britain, Hitchens reaches the wholly illogical conclusion that that same British democracy alone is quite capable of putting the clock back". He also stated that Hitchens was wrong to hold Eurosceptic views.

Alan Cowell, in a mostly critical review in The New York Times, stated "in the 1950s and 60s, Britain was a gentler, more deferential place; the churches were better attended; children did give up their bus seats to adults; and a generation was nurtured on a history of wartime victory and imperial grandeur that had yet to be derided as myth or oppression". However, Cowell questioned the "Canute-like subtext" of the book that "the destructive forces of television, McDonald's and American popular culture could have been held back". In The Weekly Standard, another US publication, Jonathan Foreman wrote that "at its best this book combines superb reporting (especially about the hijacking of education by frustrated leftists) with a heartbreaking analysis of one of the strangest revolutions in history. And in many ways it is the most important of the torrent of books that have dealt with the crisis of British identity". However, Foreman added that the book suffered from "cranky fogeyism", and he was particularly critical of both the chapter analysing the Chatterley trial and the premise that satirical television and radio programmes of the late 1950s and early 1960s contributed towards destroying British national unity. For the World Socialist Web Site, Julie Hyland wrote that the book was "akin to wading through a foul smelling sewer. It is packed with prejudice, puerile amalgams and gaping inconsistencies."

A 2025 profile of Hitchens in Cherwell, a student newspaper at the University of Oxford, was critical of the book: "The weaknesses of The Abolition of Britain, as a polemic, are fundamental ones which can be inferred even from its title. "Abolition" stresses that such things as the treatment of single parents or the availability of contraception were the result of deliberate campaigns for change; he [Hitchens] does not think that these changes might have happened naturally over time. Moreover, the focus specifically on "Britain" overlooks the fact that such inventions as colour television or the contraceptive pill were worldwide phenomena, by no means exclusive to this country."

== Publishing history ==
The book was first published in Britain by Quartet Books in 1999 (ISBN 0-7043-8117-6), and then in a revised edition the following year. The volume was published in North America by Encounter Books in 2000 (ISBN 1-893554-18-X). It was reissued in the UK by Continuum in 2008, with a new introduction by Hitchens (ISBN 1847065228). The book is subtitled "From Lady Chatterley to Tony Blair" in its British editions and "From Winston Churchill to Princess Diana" in its American editions. The book was reissued with the altered subtitle "From Winston Churchill to Theresa May" in August 2018 by Bloomsbury Continuum, with a new afterword by Hitchens (ISBN 9781472959928).

== Bibliography ==
- Hitchens, Peter (2000). The Abolition of Britain. Quartet Books; New edition (1 April 2000). ISBN 0-7043-8140-0. Published with a new Introduction, 2008.

== See also ==
- Germany Abolishes Itself
- The Death of the West
