= Every Face Tells a Story =

1977 studio album by Cliff Richard

Studio album by Cliff Richard
- Released: March 18, 1977
- Recorded: September 1976 − January 1977
- Studio: Abbey Road
- Genre: Pop, rock, country rock
- Label: EMI, Rocket
- Producer: Bruce Welch

Cliff Richard chronology
I'm Nearly Famous (1976)	Every Face Tells a Story (1977)	40 Golden Greats (1977)

Singles from Every Face Tells a Story
- 1. "Hey Mr. Dream Maker" Released: 6 November 1976; 2. "My Kinda Life" Released: 25 February 1977; 3. "When Two Worlds Drift Apart" Released: 27 June 1977

Alternative cover
- US version of the album

Professional ratings
Review scores
Source	Rating
Allmusic	3/5 stars

Every Face Tells a Story is the nineteenth studio album by Cliff Richard. Released in March 1977, it followed up Richard's comeback album, I'm Nearly Famous. The album peaked at No.8 during a 10-week run on the UK Album Chart and spawned three hit singles. "Hey Mr. Dream Maker" was released as the first lead single in November 1976 and reached number 31 in the UK Singles Chart. "My Kinda Life" was released as a single in late February 1977 and peaked at number 15 in the UK. The third single, "When Two Worlds Drift Apart", was released in late June and reached number 46 in the UK.

The album was released in the US with alternative artwork and an edited version of the closing track "Spider Man" (shortened by nearly four minutes). "Don't Turn Out the Light" was the first single released in the US and reached number 57 in the Billboard Hot 100. "Try a Smile" was also released as a single and reached number 48 in what was then known as the Billboard Easy Listening chart.

== Release history ==
- March 1977 - Original release on LP, cassette and 8-track.
- July 2002 - Remastered and re-issued on Compact disc, including the B-sides of the singles.

== Track listing ==
Side one

1. "My Kinda Life" (Chris East) 3:48
2. "Must Be Love" (Terry Britten) 4:19
3. "When Two Worlds Drift Apart" (Peter Sills) 4:14
4. "You Got Me Wondering" (Terry Britten) 3:38
5. "Every Face Tells a Story (It Never Tells a Lie)" (Michael Allison, Peter Sills) 3:20
6. "Try a Smile" (John Perry) 3:20

Side two

1. "Hey Mr. Dream Maker" (Bruce Welch, Alan Tarney) 4:48
2. "Give Me Love Your Way" (Alan Tarney, Trevor Spencer) 3:44
3. "Up in the World" (Clifford T. Ward) 2:40
4. "Don't Turn the Light Out" (Guy Fletcher, Doug Flett) 4:01
5. "It'll Be Me Babe" (Hank Marvin, John Farrar) 3:20
6. "Spider Man" (Terry Britten) 6:50 (Original North American pressings have a shorter version clocking at 3:34 and with a different ending.)

NOTE: On original North American pressings, "Don't Turn the Light Out" is the first song on side 2, before "Hey Mr. Dream Maker". Also, in 1981, this album was re-issued in the US by EMI America. That re-issue omitted "Try a Smile" and "Spider Man".

Bonus tracks (2002 re-issue)

1. "No One Waits" (Cliff Richard, Gary Isherwood) 3:41
2. "Nothing Left for Me to Say" (Cliff Richard) 3:55
3. "That's Why I Love You" (Gene Garfin, Andrew Gold) 3:09

== Personnel ==
- Cliff Richard - vocals
- Terry Britten - guitar
- Alan Tarney - bass
- Graham Todd - keyboards
- Brian Bennett - drums, percussion
- Frank Ricotti - percussion
- Tony Rivers, John Perry - backing vocals
- Mo Witham - guitar on "My Kinda Life"
- Alan Jones - bass on "My Kinda Life"
- Alan Hawkshaw - keyboards on "My Kinda Life"
- Roger Pope - drums on "My Kinda Life"
- Richard Hewson - string arrangements
- Bruce Welch - producer
- Gered Mankowitz - photography
