= The Phoney Victory =

2018 book by Peter Hitchens

The Phoney Victory: The World War II Illusion
- Author: Peter Hitchens
- Subject: British politics, World War II
- Genre: Non-fiction
- Publisher: I.B. Tauris
- Publication date: 29 August 2018
- Publication place: United Kingdom
- Pages: 240
- ISBN: 9781788313292
- Preceded by: Short Breaks in Mordor
- Followed by: Unconventional Wisdom

The Phoney Victory: The World War II Illusion is a book by Peter Hitchens. It was published in August 2018 by I.B. Tauris. The book addresses what Hitchens regards as the national myth of the Second World War, which he believes dealt long-term damage to Britain and its position in the world.

He argues that while the Allies were, indeed, fighting a radical evil, they sometimes used immoral methods, such as the Allies' carpet bombing of German civilians. He believes that Britain's entry into World War II led to its rapid decline after the war. This was because, among other things, it could not finance the war and was not prepared. As a result, it had to surrender much of its wealth and power to avoid bankruptcy. However, Hitchens does not make a universal anti-war case because he believes that this position often leaves countries unprotected and defenceless in times of war. Instead, he argues that military power and the threat of war can be necessary deterrents against war.

== Reception ==
The book was negatively reviewed by Richard J. Evans, former Regius Professor of Modern History at the University of Cambridge, in the New Statesman. Evans described the book as "riddled with errors" and reliant on "a handful of eccentric studies.".

Daniel Johnson writing in Standpoint disagreed with many of the claims made in the book, and compared it negatively to the recent book Churchill: Walking with Destiny, which Johnson said refuted Hitchens' "claim that the whole conflict was unnecessary".
