= My Kinda Life =

1977 Cliff Richard single

Single by Cliff Richard

from the album Every Face Tells a Story
- B-side: "Nothing Left for Me to Say"
- Released: 25 February 1977
- Recorded: 10 January 1977
- Studio: Abbey Road
- Genre: Pop rock, Country rock
- Length: 3:29
- Label: EMI
- Songwriter(s): Chris East
- Producer(s): Bruce Welch

Cliff Richard singles chronology
"Hey Mr. Dream Maker" (1976)	"My Kinda Life" (1977)	"When Two Worlds Drift Apart" (1977)

Music video
- "My Kinda Life" on YouTube

"My Kinda Life" is a song by Cliff Richard from his album Every Face Tells a Story and the second single from the album following the debut single "Hey Mr. Dream Maker". It was released as a single in 1977 reaching No. 15 on the UK singles chart. It peaked at No. 61 in Australia, No. 19 in Belgium, No. 38 in Germany and No. 18 in the Netherlands.

This was Richard's first standard two-song single to be released with a picture sleeve in the UK.

== Chart performance ==
Charts (1977)	Peak position
UK Singles (OCC)	15
Australia (Kent Music Report)	61
Belgium (Ultratop 50 Flanders)	19
Belgium (Ultratop 50 Wallonia)	26
France (SNEP)	15
Germany (GfK)	38
Netherlands (Single Top 100)	18
