= The War We Never Fought =

2012 book by Peter Hitchens

- Author: Peter Hitchens
- Subject: Drugs, prohibition
- Genre: Polemics
- Published: 27 September 2012 (Continuum)
- Publication place: United Kingdom
- Pages: 304
- ISBN: 9781441173317
- Preceded by: The Rage Against God
- Followed by: Short Breaks in Mordor

The War We Never Fought: The British Establishment's Surrender to Drugs is the sixth book by the British author and Mail on Sunday columnist Peter Hitchens, first published in 2012.

The book is intended as a rebuttal of what Hitchens sees as the widespread acceptance of drug use and the weakening of drug prohibition in Britain since the Misuse of Drugs Act 1971, when a Conservative government adopted a Labour Party policy to implement the Wootton Report. Hitchens believes that there is de facto decriminalisation of drugs in the UK, especially of cannabis, contrary to claims of drug "prohibition" from "Big Dope" (name he gives to the cannabis legalisation lobby). Hitchens contends that it is only through much harsher and more stringent punishment – for both consumers and dealers of drugs – that any war on drugs can be successful.

== Background ==
Before the book's publication, Hitchens had often advocated in his writing a society governed by conscience and the rule of law, which he sees as the best guarantee of liberty, and he had also frequently and at length voiced opposition to the decriminalisation of recreational drugs. Hitchens had debated a number of figures who are for such decriminalisation, including Christopher Snowdon of the Institute of Economic Affairs, and Howard Marks. He has also debated the topic of drugs with the comedian Russell Brand.

In April 2012, Hitchens had given evidence to the Parliamentary Home Affairs Select Committee as part of its inquiry into drugs policy and called for the British government to introduce a more hardline policy on drugs.

The cover image parodies the cover for the Beatles album Sgt. Pepper's Lonely Hearts Club Band.

== Critical reception ==
A month before The War We Never Fought's publication, Ed West in The Daily Telegraph said that the book had provoked criticism not only from the Left, but also from the free-market libertarian Right.

In Prospect magazine, Peter Lilley wrote that Hitchens "realises there are only two logically coherent policies: prohibition and legalisation. Decriminalisation, the fashionable option of the intelligentsia, makes no sense, though it is the destination which policy in this country has moved towards for several decades" and "the most refreshing aspect of this book is its recognition that drug taking is fundamentally a moral issue". A largely positive review by William Dove in the International Business Times stated that, "Hitchens makes a convincing case that the anti-drug laws are not unenforceable as legalisers might claim, but unenforced".

In a very critical review in The Observer, Nicholas Lezard stated that the book "should never have been published", while Jonathan Rée in The Guardian dismissed the book as "hysterical" and accused its author of "moral racism".

== See also ==
- Drug liberalization
- War on drugs
- Cannabis in the United Kingdom
