= Devil Woman (Cliff Richard song) =

- Cover of 1982 UK re-release

Single by Cliff Richard

from the album I'm Nearly Famous
- B-side: "Love On (Shine On)"
- Released: 23 April 1976
- Recorded: 8–9 September 1975
- Studio: EMI Studios, London
- Genre: Pop rock; glam rock
- Length: 3:41
- Label: EMI; Rocket
- Songwriters: Terry Britten; Christine Authors
- Producer: Bruce Welch

Cliff Richard singles chronology
"Miss You Nights" (1975)	"Devil Woman" (1976)	"I Can't Ask for Anymore Than You" (1976)

Music video
- "Devil Woman" on YouTube

"Devil Woman" is a 1976 single by British singer Cliff Richard from his album I'm Nearly Famous.

A worldwide hit on its original release, the song saw a resurgence in popularity after appearing in the film I, Tonya (2017), as the theme for the character of LaVona Golden, played by Allison Janney.

The song was written by Terry Britten and Christine Authors (who was the singer of the Family Dogg under the name Christine Holmes). The song is told from the point of view of a man jinxed from an encounter with a stray cat with evil eyes, and his discovery that the psychic medium whose help he sought to break the curse was the one responsible for the curse in the first place. However, the nature of the curse is not made clear.

== Original release ==
Released in late April 1976, "Devil Woman" rose to #9 on the singles chart in the United Kingdom in June 1976. It became Richard's first single to reach the Top 20 in the US, making #6 on the Hot 100, Richard's highest-peaking single and biggest seller in the US. "Devil Woman" is the third biggest-selling Cliff Richard single, with over 2,000,000 copies sold worldwide. It was certified Gold by the RIAA in the US and the CRIA in Canada.

The musicians featured on the recording are Terry Britten on guitar, Alan Tarney on bass, Clem Cattini on drums, Graham Todd on keyboards, and Tony Rivers, John Perry, and Ken Gold on backing vocals, with string arrangements by Richard Hewson. The song is heavily guitar-driven, with soft-distortion lines doubling the melody in the chorus and long, high, sustained single notes providing atmosphere over the verses. A Rhodes electric piano, bass guitar, drums, and percussion are the only other instruments.

The chorus vocal line was mimicked on Black Sabbath's "Lady Evil".

== Track listing ==
7": EMI / EMI 2458

1. "Devil Woman" – 3:41
2. "Love On (Shine On) – 3:04

7": Rocket / PIG-40574 (North America)

1. "Devil Woman" – 3:35
2. "Love On (Shine On) – 3:04

== Personnel ==
- Cliff Richard – vocals
- Terry Britten – guitar
- Alan Tarney – bass guitar
- Graham Todd – electric piano
- Clem Cattini – drums
- Tony Rivers – backing vocals
- John Perry – backing vocals
- Ken Gold – backing vocals

== In popular culture ==
"Devil Woman" is featured in I, Tonya, a 2017 biopic starring Margot Robbie as figure skater Tonya Harding. In August 2026, the song was prominently featured in the promotional trailer Grand Theft Auto VI: An Extended Look. The appearance of the song in the trailer resulted in a reported 325% increase in daily streams. The song was also included as a track in Grand Theft Auto VI's fictional soft rock radio station "Emotion 98.3".

== Charts ==
=== Weekly charts ===
Chart (1976)	Peak position
Australia (Kent Music Report)	3
Belgium (Ultratop 50 Wallonia)	32
Canada Top Singles (RPM)	4
Canada Adult Contemporary (RPM)	29
Canada (CHUM)	3
Denmark (Danmarks Radio)	12
France (IFOP)	8
Ireland (IRMA)	6
New Zealand (Recorded Music NZ)	5
Norway (VG-lista)	7
South Africa (Springbok Radio)	1
UK Singles (Official Charts)	9
US Billboard Hot 100	6
US Adult Contemporary (Billboard)	30
US Cash Box Top 100	5
US Record World Top 100	5

=== Year-end charts ===
Chart (1976)	Rank
Australia (Kent Music Report)	26
Canada (RPM)	57
New Zealand (RIANZ)	17
South Africa (Springbok Radio)	14
US Billboard	55
US Cash Box	58

== Certifications ==
Region	Certification	Certified units/sales
Canada (Music Canada)	Gold	75,000^{^}
United States (RIAA)	Gold	1,000,000^{^}
^{^} Shipments figures based on certification alone.
