= I Can't Ask for Anymore Than You =

- Cover of German release

Single by Cliff Richard

from the album I'm Nearly Famous
- B-side: "Junior Cowboy"
- Released: 23 July 1976
- Recorded: 8–9 September 1975
- Studio: EMI Studios, London
- Genre: Pop
- Length: 2:50
- Label: EMI; Rocket
- Songwriter(s): Ken Gold; Michael Denne
- Producer(s): Bruce Welch

Cliff Richard singles chronology
"Devil Woman" (1976)	"I Can't Ask for Anymore Than You" (1976)	"Hey Mr. Dream Maker" (1976)

"I Can't Ask for Anymore Than You" is a song by British singer Cliff Richard, released as the third single from his album I'm Nearly Famous in July 1976. It reached number 17 in the UK Singles Chart and number 80 in the Billboard Hot 100. It also did particularly well in Ireland, reaching number 2.

== Release ==
"I Can't Ask for Anymore Than You" was written by Ken Gold and Michael Denne. Produced by Bruce Welch, it features Richard signing in falsetto, something he hadn't done before. Tony Rivers has said that "the original demo featured Mick singing the lead vocals in his high voice and Bruce liked it so much he kept it in the same key, and got Cliff to sing it in that key!". It was released as a single with the B-side "Junior Cowboy", written by Michael Allison and Peter Sills.

== Track listing ==
7": EMI / EMI 2499

1. "I Can't Ask for Anymore Than You" – 2:50
2. "Junior Cowboy" – 2:44

== Personnel ==
- Cliff Richard – vocals
- Terry Britten – guitar
- Alan Tarney – bass
- Clem Cattini – drums
- Graham Todd – keyboards
- Tony Rivers – backing vocals, vocal arrangement
- John Perry – backing vocals
- Ken Gold – backing vocals
- Richard Hewson – string arrangements
- Bruce Welch – producer, arrangement

== Chart performance ==
Chart (1976)	Peak position
Belgium (Ultratop 50 Flanders)	23
Ireland (IRMA)	2
Netherlands (Dutch Top 40 Tipparade)	11
Netherlands (Single Tip)	19
New Zealand (Recorded Music NZ)	38
UK Singles (OCC)	17
US Billboard Hot 100	80
