= When Two Worlds Drift Apart =

1977 single by Cliff Richard

- Cover of German release

Single by Cliff Richard

from the album Every Face Tells a Story
- B-side: "That's Why I Love You"
- Released: 27 June 1977
- Recorded: 7,13 September 1976
- Studio: Abbey Road
- Label: EMI
- Songwriter(s): Peter Sills
- Producer(s): Bruce Welch

Cliff Richard singles chronology
"My Kinda Life" (1977)	"When Two Worlds Drift Apart" (1977)	"Yes! He Lives" (1978)

Music video
- "When Two Worlds Drift Apart" on YouTube

"Remember"
- French adaptation and release of When Two Worlds Drift Apart

Single by Cliff Richard

from the album My Kinda Life
- B-side: "Lucille"
- Released: May 1992 (France)
- Recorded: 1–2 Feb, 20–23 Apr 1992
- Label: EMI France
- Songwriter(s): Peter Sills
- Producer(s): Bruce Welch, Cliff Richard, Paul Moesll

Cliff Richard singles chronology
"This New Year" (1991)	"Remember" (1992)	"I Still Believe in You" (1992)

"When Two Worlds Drift Apart" is a song by Cliff Richard from his album Every Face Tells a Story and the third single from the album. It was released as a single in 1977 reaching number 46 on the UK singles chart. In South Africa it reached number 19.

In 1992 Richard released a French adaptation of the song titled "Remember" as a single in France. It was taken from his album My Kinda Life that was only released in France. The album was made up of re-recordings and remixes of a selection of his previously released material from 1976 to 1989.

== Chart performance ==
Charts (1977)	Peak position
UK Singles (OCC)	46
South Africa (Springbok Radio)	19
