= John Dawson Read =

English singer-songwriter

John Dawson Read is an English singer-songwriter.

Born in Wokingham, Berkshire, England, Read first came to prominence in 1975 with his debut album A Friend of Mine Is Going Blind, released on Chrysalis Records. The album's title song was written by Read for a friend of his who suffered from muscular dystrophy. Read credits his friend with having been a writing inspiration for years, as well as being responsible for his debut album, having sent Read's songs to publishers.

Read's second album, Read On, was released in 1976, again on Chrysalis. Around this time, his song Such Is the Mystery was featured on Cliff Richard's acclaimed album I'm Nearly Famous. After this release Read seemed to disappear from the music business. Fans had little success finding information on Read until singer-songwriter Michael Johnson put an MP3 of "A Friend of Mine Is Going Blind" on his website. Many Read fans began communicating through the site, and this was one factor which encouraged Read to re-enter the music world after spending most of the time between 1976 and 2005 in a business partnership in marketing.

Read credits his discovery of Pristine Audio as being "the second most influential factor in ‘getting back into it.’" Andrew Rose of Pristine Audio remastered A Friend of Mine Is Going Blind and Read On.

In 2005, Read released his third CD after a nearly 30-year absence from the music world. This CD, entitled Now...Where Were We? begins with "Days of Sweet Remembrance (reprise)" from the album Read On.
