= I'm Nearly Famous =

1976 studio album by Cliff Richard

Studio album by Cliff Richard
- Released: 7 May 1976
- Recorded: September–December 1975
- Studios: Abbey Road Studios, London
- Genres: Pop, MOR, rock, disco
- Length: 40:32 (59:21 2001 CD)
- Labels: EMI (UK); Rocket (US)
- Producer: Bruce Welch

Cliff Richard chronology
The 31st of February Street (1974)	I'm Nearly Famous (1976)	Every Face Tells a Story (1977)

Singles from I'm Nearly Famous
- 1. "Miss You Nights" Released: 14 November 1975; 2. "Devil Woman" Released: 23 April 1976; 3. "I Can't Ask for Anymore Than You" Released: 23 July 1976

Professional ratings
Review scores
Source	Rating
Allmusic	3/5 stars

I'm Nearly Famous is the eighteenth studio album by Cliff Richard, released in May 1976.

The album is considered one of his finest works and is held as the album which brought about Cliff Richard's revival as a major chart act. The lead single on the album, "Miss You Nights", made number 15 in the UK Singles Chart in early 1976, followed by "Devil Woman", which showed a new harder-edged side to Richard's music and became one of his biggest worldwide hits, peaking at number 9 in the UK and becoming his first US Top 10, reaching number 6 and earning a gold disc for sales of half a million. "I Can't Ask for Anymore Than You" was the third single, reaching number 17 in the UK and number 80 in the US.

== Background ==
Cliff Richard's career had seen a downward slump in the 1970s compared to his success in the previous decade, culminating in his not hitting the chart at all in 1975 - the first year of his career not to do so. Bruce Welch set about finding new songs for Cliff and produced the album which would mark his comeback. The lead single on the album was "Miss You Nights". Although it was released in November 1975, it did not make the UK charts until early 1976, eventually peaking at No.15.

The follow-up, "Devil Woman", showed a new harder-edged side to Richard's music and became one of his biggest worldwide hits, peaking at No.9 in the UK and becoming his first ever top 10 hit in the US. Third single, "I Can't Ask for Anymore Than You", backed with album track "Junior Cowboy", completed the hat-trick of UK top 20 entries, while the album itself reached No.5 and remained in the charts for 21 weeks - his most successful album for over a decade. It was also his first hit album in the US (peaking at No.76).

The album received rave reviews in the press and received kudos from celebrities such as Elton John and Elizabeth Taylor who wore T-shirts emblazoned with the I'm Nearly Famous logo. Melody Maker was particularly enthusiastic about the album, with Geoff Brown writing:

Cliff Richard has at last made the sort of album he could, and should, have been making for years. It is with some incredulity that I have to say that for the past ten days I've been playing two albums constantly. One is Marvin Gaye's I Want You. The other is I'm Nearly Famous. The renaissance of Richard, for that is what I believe this album heralds, is long overdue...it is the best album of new songs ever and, if there are enough unprejudiced ears around, could well mark the start of fresh Cliff Richard buying public.

The album was remastered and re-issued on compact disc in 2001, where it again received rave reviews from Q Magazine and Record Collector among others.

== Track listing ==
Side One

1. "I Can't Ask for Anymore Than You" (Ken Gold, Michael Denne) – 2:50
2. "It's No Use Pretending" (Michael Allison, Peter Sills) – 3:22
3. "I'm Nearly Famous" (Michael Allison, Peter Sills) – 3:54
4. "Lovers" (Mickey Newbury) – 2:58
5. "Junior Cowboy" (Michael Allison, Peter Sills) – 2:54
6. "Miss You Nights" (Dave Townsend) – 3:57

Side Two

1. "I Wish You'd Change Your Mind" (Terry Britten) – 3:04
2. "Devil Woman" (Terry Britten, Christine Holmes) – 3:41
3. "Such is the Mystery" (John Dawson Read) – 5:11
4. "You've Got to Give Me All Your Lovin'" (Ken Gold, Michael Denne) – 3:06
5. "If You Walked Away" (David Pomeranz) – 3:02
6. "Alright, It's Alright" (erroneously listed on original North American pressings as "It's Alright Now") (Michael Allison, Peter Sills) – 2:33

NOTE: In 1981, this album was re-issued in the US by EMI America and in Canada by Capitol. That re-issue omitted "It's No Use Pretending" and "Such Is the Mystery".

2001 re-issue bonus tracks

1. "Love Enough" (Tim Moore) – 2:50
2. "Love On (Shine On)" (Cliff Richard) – 3:04
3. "Honky Tonk Angel" (Troy Seals, Denny Rice) – 3:03
4. "Wouldn't You Know It" (Alan Tarney, Trevor Spencer) – 3:03
5. "It's Only Me You've Left Behind" (Hank Marvin, John Farrar) – 3:07
6. "You're the One" (Alan Tarney, Trevor Spencer) – 3:42

== Arrangements ==
- Andrew Powell on "Miss You Nights"
- Bruce Welch – tracks 1–3, 5, 7, 8, 10, 12
- Richard Hewson – tracks 4, 9, 11

== Charts ==
=== Weekly charts ===
Weekly chart performance for I'm Nearly Famous
Chart (1976)	Peak position
Australia (Kent Music Report)	45
Canada Top Albums/CDs (RPM)	23
UK Albums (Official Charts)	5
US Billboard 200	76

=== Monthly charts ===
Monthly chart performance for I'm Nearly Famous
Chart (1978)	Peak position
Soviet Albums (MK)	6

=== Year-end charts ===
Year-end chart performance for I'm Nearly Famous
Chart (1978)	Position
Soviet Albums (MK)	9

=== Singles ===
Release date	Title	UK	US	AUS	IRE
November 1975	"Miss You Nights"	15	—	100	—
April 1976	"Devil Woman"	9	6	3	5
July 1976	"I Can't Ask for Anymore Than You"	17	80	—	2
