= Gered Mankowitz =

English photographer

Gered Mankowitz FRPS
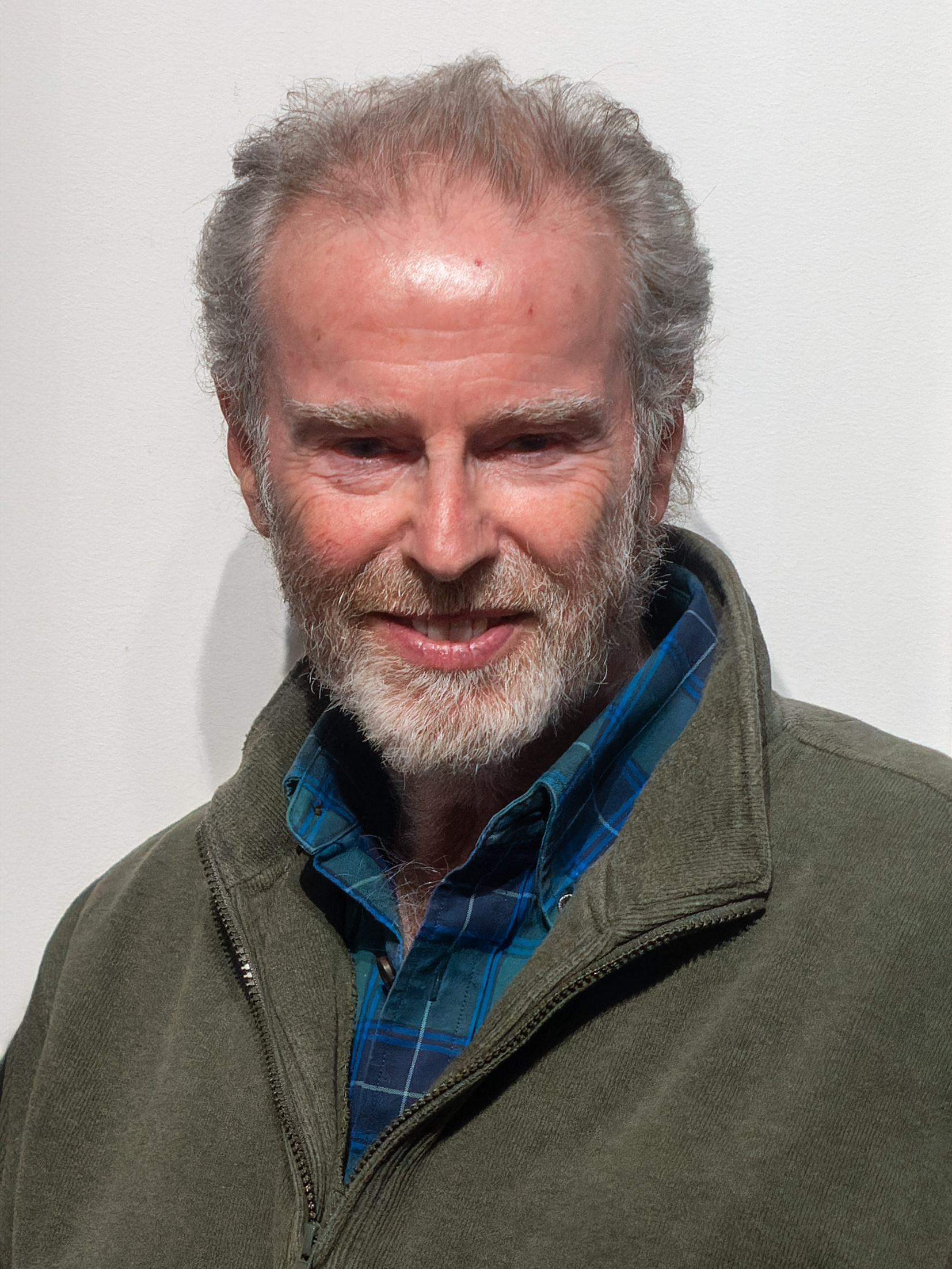
- Mankowitz at Iconic Images Gallery in 2023
- Born: Gered W. Mankowitz; 3 August 1946 (age 80); London, England
- Occupation: Photographer
- Father: Wolf Mankowitz
- Website: mankowitz.com

Gered W. Mankowitz (born 3 August 1946) is an English photographer who focused his career in the music industry. He has worked with a range of artists from the Rolling Stones to Jimi Hendrix, and in other divisions of the photography industry, including fashion, music, advertising, news, and private photography. He currently lives in Cornwall. His archive is owned and managed by Iconic Images, and housed in their flagship Gallery in Piccadilly in central London.

== Life and career ==
Gered W. Mankowitz was born as the first of four sons on 3 August 1946 in London, England, to the English writer Wolf Mankowitz and Ann Margaret Seligman. After attending multiple schools throughout his education, Mankowitz dropped out of school at 15 years of age, without any proper qualifications. However, his natural photography gifts were discovered on a school trip to the Netherlands by the photographer Tom Blau. Blau offered Mankowitz an apprenticeship, and after a few months on the job, he had worked in all the departments, and began taking assignments. In 1962, Mankowitz began taking photos professionally in Barbados, and when he returned to London, he worked briefly in fashion, but quickly realized that that style of photography was not for him. In 1963, he broke into the music photography industry, and felt at home being able to work with artists his own age. Early that year, Mankowitz opened his own studio.

After a few months, Mankowitz began working with Marianne Faithfull and the Rolling Stones, and was asked to go on tour with the Rolling Stones. After his stint on tour, he had the opportunity to work with Jimi Hendrix, Free, Traffic, The Yardbirds, The Small Faces, Soft Machine, Slade, Gary Glitter, Suzi Quatro, Sweet, Elton John, Elkie Brooks, Robert Palmer Kate Bush, Eurythmics, ABC, and Duran Duran. In 1982, Mankowitz was featured in an exhibition at London's Photographer's Gallery, and had his work viewed by over 16,000 people. This exhibition then toured the U.K. for 2 years. For the next 22 years, Mankowitz was based in his North London Studio, mainly working in the advertising industry, and contributing to major publications. He continues to work in the music industry, regularly works for newspapers and magazines, and his work is shown and sold in galleries throughout the world.

== Influence and contributions ==
When asked if he thought that his work influenced the image of the Rolling Stones, Mankowitz stated:

I think I contributed a lot when I did the cover of the album Between the Buttons. My contribution in the earlier sessions was based more on an honesty, a desire to communicate something about the Stones as people and not try and mask their personalities with any sort of technical or theatrical embellishments. I think that that’s why (their manager) Andrew (Loog Oldham) liked the pictures and why the band were happy to work with me for such a long period of time, because I photographed them as they were. And then when it came to Between the Buttons, I felt confident enough as a photographer and in my relationship with them to actually make a contribution.

Mankowitz's photographs of Jimi Hendrix did not gain popularity until several years after they were taken. They were taken in black and white, which was Mankowitz's typical style, but Hendrix's record label insisted on colour photographs for album covers. Therefore, the pictures were not widely seen until 1992, when Mankowitz had his first solo exhibition in London. The collection of Jimi Hendrix photos have since appeared on books, record covers, and magazines.

In regards to a photo taken by Mankowitz, John Varvatos, a men's fashion designer, wrote: "This is from a series of photos Gered Mankowitz did with Jimi in 1967 at Mason's Yard in London. That series may be the most important pictures to me. I have a big, limited-edition print of that photo behind my desk. I look at it every day when I come in. There was nobody that looked like that when Jimi came on the scene, and there are not very many people who could pull that look off."

== Works ==
=== Photographs gallery ===
Source:

=== Photographic books ===
- Breaking Stones: 1963–1965 A Band on the Brink of Superstardom, with Terry O'Neill, 2016.
- Rock and Roll Photography, with Brian Southall, 2015.
- 50 Years of Rock and Roll Photography, with Brian Southall, Peter York, and Annie Lennox, 2014.
- The Experience: Jimi Hendrix at Mason’s Yard, 2013.
- Rolling Stones (One on One), with Sean Egan, 2012.
- The Experience: Jimi Hendrix at Mason's Yard, with Richie Unterberger, 2010.
- The Rolling Stones-Out of Their Heads: 1965-1967/1982: Photographs, 2006.
- Chapters of Gold: The Life of Mary in Mosaics, with Rachel Billington, 2005.
- Jimi Hendrix: The Complete Masons Yard Photo Sessions, 2004.
- The Stones 65-67, with Andrew Loog Oldham, 2002.
- I-Contact, 2002.
- Masons Yard to Primrose Hill, 1995.
- The Jimi Hendrix Experience in 1967, with Brian Hogg, 1991.
- Pop Stars Portraits of the 50s 60s 70s and 80s, with Harry Hammond, 1990.
- Satisfaction: The Rolling Stones 1965-1967, 1984.
- Hit Parade: A 35-year Perspective of Music Performers Through the Photography of Harry Hammond and Gered Mankowitz, with Harry Hammond, 1984.
- Pop Shots: A 35-year Perspective of Music Performers Through the Photography of Harry Hammond and Gered Mankowitz, with Harry Hammond, 1984.
