= The Rage Against God =

2010 book by Peter Hitchens

- Front cover of the UK edition
- Author: Peter Hitchens
- Language: English
- Subject: Religion, autobiography
- Genre: Apologetics
- Publisher: Continuum (UK); Zondervan (US)
- Publication date: 15 March 2010 (UK); 1 May 2010 (US)
- Publication place: United Kingdom
- Pages: 256
- ISBN: 1-4411-0572-7 (UK); 0310320313 (US)
- Preceded by: The Broken Compass
- Followed by: The War We Never Fought

The Rage Against God (subtitle in US editions: How Atheism Led Me to Faith) is the fifth book by Peter Hitchens, first published in 2010. The book describes Hitchens's journey from atheism, far-left politics, and bohemianism to Christianity and conservatism, detailing the influences on him that led to his conversion. The book is partly intended as a response to God Is Not Great, a book written by his brother Christopher Hitchens in 2007.

Peter Hitchens, with particular reference to events which occurred in the Soviet Union, argues that his brother's verdict on religion is misguided, and that faith in God is both a safeguard against the collapse of civilisation into moral chaos and the best antidote to what he views as the dangerous idea of earthly perfection through utopianism.

== Background ==
In May 2009 The Rage Against God was anticipated by Michael Gove, who wrote in The Times:

I long to see [Peter Hitchens] take the next stage in his writer's journey and examine, with his unsparing honesty, the rich human reality of the division he believes is now more important than the split between Left and Right—the deeper gulf between the restless progressive and the Christian pessimist. This division, the difference between Prometheus and St Paul, the chasm that divides Shelley from T. S. Eliot, Lloyd George from Lord Salisbury, is nowhere better encapsulated than in the contrast between Hitchens major and minor.

Hitchens first referred to The Rage Against God in August 2009, in one of his weekly columns: "Above all, I seek to counter the assertion, central to my brother's case ... that the Soviet regime was in fact religious in character. This profound misunderstanding of the nature of the USSR is the key to finding another significant flaw in what is in general his circular argument". Then, a week before the book's publication, Hitchens wrote: "... it is obvious much of what I say [in The Rage Against God] arises out of my attempt to debate religion with him [Christopher Hitchens], it would be absurd to pretend that much of what I say here is not intended to counter or undermine arguments he presented in his book, God Is Not Great ...".

== Synopsis ==
=== Part One: A Personal Journey Through Atheism ===
In the book Hitchens describes how the painting The Last Judgement played a significant part in his conversion to Christianity.

In Chapter 1, Hitchens describes abandoning religion in his youth, and promoting "cruel revolutionary rubbish" as a Trotskyist activist. He argues his generation had become intellectually aloof from religion, rebellious and disillusioned and in Chapter 2 explores further reasons for this disillusion, including the Suez Crisis and the Profumo affair. In Chapter 3, Hitchens recounts how he embraced scientific inquiry and adopted liberal positions on issues such as marriage, abortion, homosexuality and patriotism. Chapter 4 is a lament for the "noble austerity" of his childhood in Britain. Chapter 5 explores what Hitchens views as the pseudo-religion surrounding Winston Churchill and World War II heroes – a "great cult of noble, patriotic death" whose only equivalent, he says, was in the Soviet Union. Hitchens then asserts that, "The Christian Church has been powerfully damaged by letting itself be confused with love of country and the making of great wars".

In Chapter 6, Hitchens recalls being a foreign correspondent in the Soviet Union and a trip to Mogadishu, and how these experiences convinced him that, "his own civilisation was infinitely precious and utterly vulnerable". In Chapter 7, Hitchens charts his return to Christianity, and makes particular reference to the experience of seeing the Rogier van der Weyden painting The Last Judgement: "I gaped, my mouth actually hanging open. These people did not appear remote or from the ancient past; they were my own generation ... I had absolutely no doubt I was among the damned". In Chapter 8, Hitchens examines the diminishing of Christianity in Britain and its potential causes.

=== Part Two: Addressing Atheism: Three Failed Arguments ===
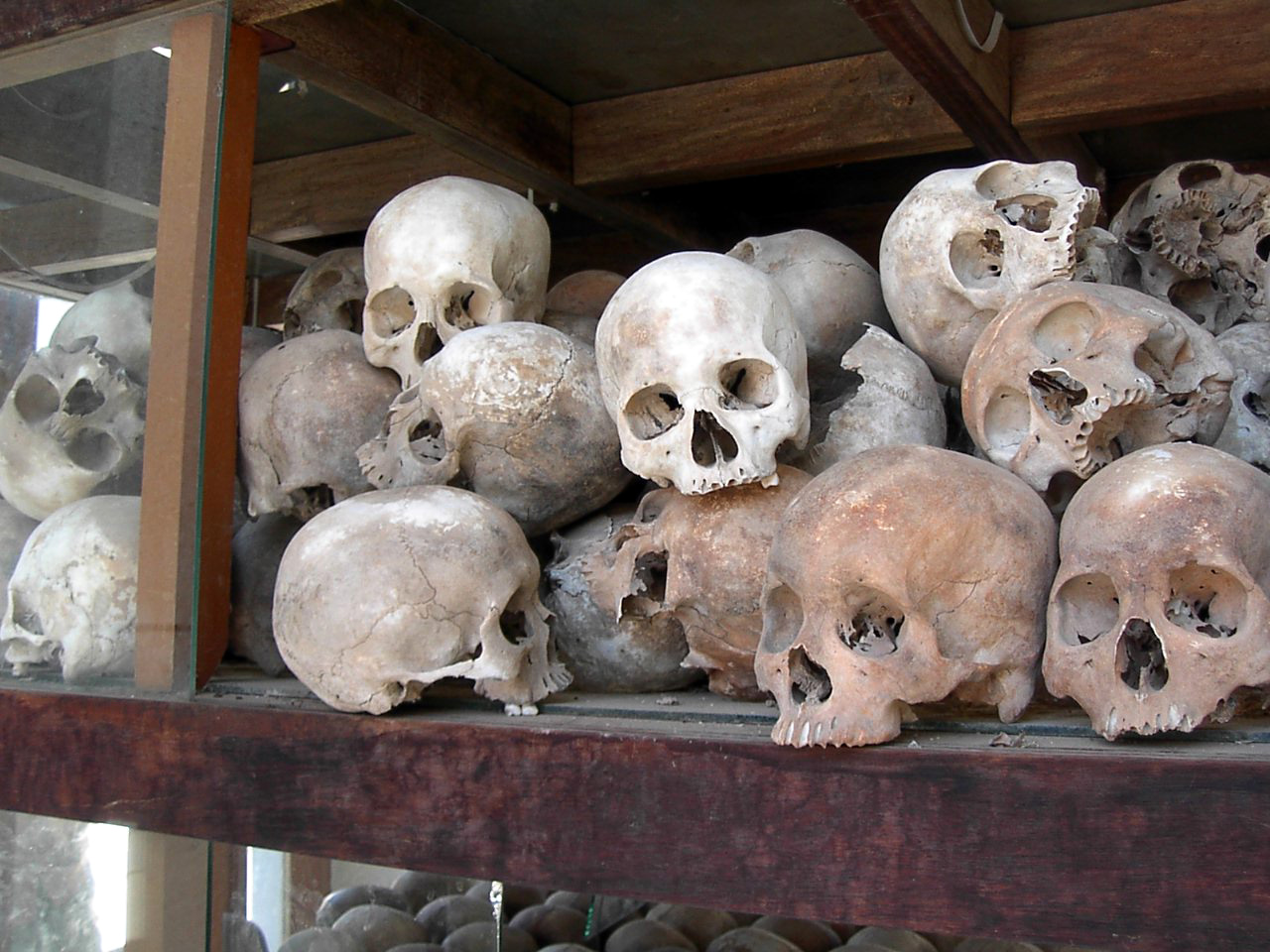
In the book, Hitchens cites atrocities committed under the Khmer Rouge as an example of crimes against humanity perpetrated by atheist states (skulls of victims shown).

In Chapter 9, Hitchens contends that the argument that religion is a source of conflict is a "cruel factual misunderstanding", and that a number of conflicts, including The Troubles in Ireland and the Arab–Israeli conflict, were not motivated by religion but tribal in nature and disputes over territory. Chapter 10 discusses whether morality can be determined without the concept of God. Hitchens asserts that atheists "have a fundamental inability to concede that to be effectively absolute, a moral code needs to be beyond human power to alter". He also describes as flawed his brother's assertion in God is Not Great that "the order to love thy neighbour 'as thyself' is too extreme and too strenuous to be obeyed". Hitchens ends the chapter by stating, "in all my experience in life, I have seldom seen a more powerful argument for the fallen nature of man, and his inability to achieve perfection, than those countries in which man sets himself up to replace God with the State".

Hitchens begins Chapter 11 by asserting, "those who reject God's absolute authority, preferring their own, are far more ready to persecute than Christians have been ... Each revolutionary generation reliably repeats the savagery". He cites as examples the French revolutionary terror; the Bolshevik revolution; the Holodomor and the Soviet famine of 1932–33; the barbarity surrounding Joseph Stalin's five-year plans, repeated in the Great Leap Forward in China; atrocities committed by the Khmer Rouge; and human rights abuses in Cuba under Fidel Castro. Hitchens then quotes a number of prominent communist thinkers' pronouncements on morality, including George Lukacs stating, "Communist ethics make it the highest duty to accept the necessity of acting wickedly. This is the greatest sacrifice the revolution asks from us", and Leon Trotsky's claiming that "morality, more than any other form of ideology, has a class character".

=== Part Three: The League of the Militant Godless ===
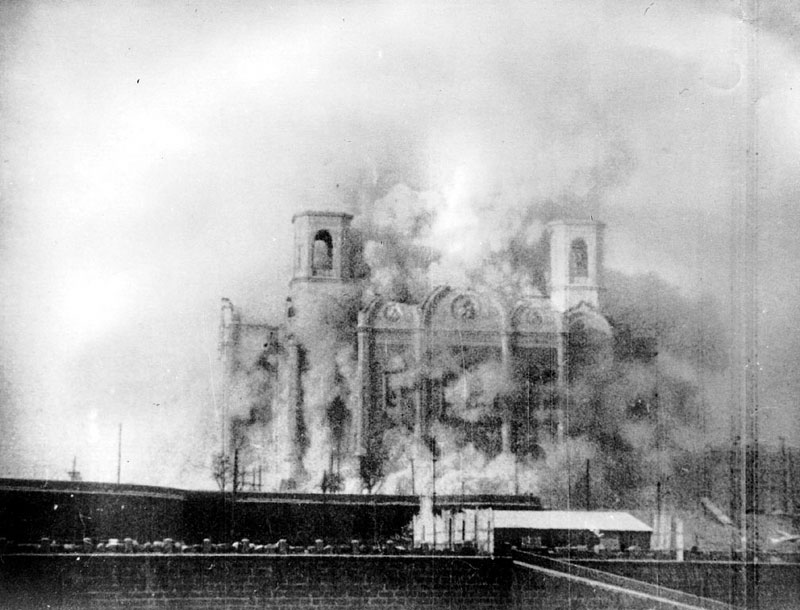
Demolition of the Cathedral of Christ the Saviour in Moscow. In the book Hitchens details various attempts by the Bolshevik regime to expunge religion from Soviet society.

Hitchens writes "the biggest fake miracle staged in human history was the claim that the Soviet Union was a new civilisation of equality, peace, love, truth, science and progress. Everyone knows that it was a prison, a slum, a return to primitive barbarism, a kingdom of lies where scientists and doctors feared offending the secret police, and that its elite were corrupt and lived in secret luxury". He then cites Walter Duranty's denying the existence of the great Ukrainian famine, and Sidney and Beatrice Webb's acceptance that the 1937 Moscow show trials were "genuine criminal prosecutions". Hitchens then examines Lenin's suppression of religion in the Soviet Union, which included making the teaching of religion to children punishable by the death penalty and the creation of an antireligious organisation of Soviet workers. Hitchens begins Chapter 13 by quoting William Henry Chamberlin: "In Russia, the world is witnessing the first effort to destroy completely any belief in supernatural interpretation of life", and then examines some consequences of this, including intolerance of religion, terror, and the persecution of priests and bishops at the Solovetsky concentration camp. Hitchens asserts that in the Soviet Union "the regime's institutional loathing for the teaching of religion, and its desire to eradicate it, survived every doctrinal detour and swerve".

In the final chapter, Hitchens analyses a number of his brother's arguments, and contends that "the coincidence in instinct, taste, and thought between my brother and the Bolsheviks and their sympathisers is striking and undeniable". He then records how his brother nominated the "apostle of revolutionary terror" Leon Trotsky for an edition of the BBC radio series Great Lives; praised Trotsky for his "moral courage"; and declared that one of Lenin's great achievements was "to create a secular Russia". Hitchens speculates that his brother remained sympathetic towards Bolshevism and is still hostile towards the things it extirpated, including monarchy, tradition, and faith. He ends the chapter by claiming a form of militant secularism is becoming established in Britain, and that "The Rage Against God is loose".

=== Epilogue ===
In the epilogue, Hitchens describes how after a 2008 debate with his brother Christopher that "the longest quarrel of my life seemed to be unexpectedly over" and that he held no hope of converting his brother, who had "bricked himself up high in his atheist tower, with slits instead of windows from which to shoot arrows at the faithful".

== Critical reception ==
In The Daily Telegraph Christopher Howse concentrated on the moral arguments in the book, and agreed with Hitchens that "to determine what is right and what is wrong without God, is difficult". Also in The Daily Telegraph, Charles Moore wrote that the book "tries to do two things at once. One is to bash up modern militant atheism with all the author's polemical skill. The other is to give an autobiographical account of how, in our time, an intelligent man's faith may recover". In a positive review in Standpoint magazine, Michael Nazir Ali wrote, "One of the abiding canards nailed by Peter Hitchens is that religion causes conflict. He does this by showing that so-called "religious" wars had many other elements to them, such as greed for territory, political ambition and nationalism. His repeated references to Soviet brutality reveal that secular ideologies have caused more suffering in recent times than any conflict associated with religion." In a more critical review in the New Statesman Sholto Byrnes wrote, "Hitchens presents his arguments with force, passion, and intelligence". However, he criticised the statement "Atheism is a license for cruelty and attracts the cruel", stating that "People given to cruelty can always find a justification for it." As an example, he mentioned that "Many of the most fervent supporters of Marshal Pétain's collaborationist Vichy state, for example, were right-wing Catholics", but he pointed out that blaming Catholicism for this would not be fair. Byrnes also reviewed the book in The Independent, where he questioned the validity of a number of Hitchens's conclusions, including that "atheists 'actively wish for disorder and meaninglessness'".

In a sympathetic review in The Guardian, Rupert Shortt wrote, "Hitchens does not seek to mount a comprehensive defence of Christianity. He is wise to avoid deeper philosophical and theological waters, because his strengths lie elsewhere. His more manageable aim is to expose what he holds to be three major fallacies underlying God Is Not Great: that conflict fought in the name of religion is really always about faith; that "it is ultimately possible to know with confidence what is right and what is wrong without acknowledging the existence of God"; and that "atheist states are not actually atheist". In The Spectator, Quentin Letts reviewed the book very positively, describing it as "a magnificent, sustained cry against the aggressive secularism taking control of our weakened culture".

Reviews of the book in North American publications subsequent to its stateside release were more mixed.

In The New York Times, Mark Oppenheimer commented, "American readers will notice a lack of enthusiasm in Peter's Christian apologetics. He proceeds largely from historical, rather than personal, evidence: here are the fruits of Christianity, and here is what one finds in its absence". In a negative review in the Winnipeg Free Press, Ted St. Godard wrote, "What Hitchens can't seem to appreciate is that, even if 'Soviet Communism is organically linked to atheism, something his brother and others argue against (if somewhat feebly), and even if one accepts that Soviet tyranny was horrible, this says little about the existence of God". In a Washington Times review entitled "Cain and Abel: The sequel?", Jeremy Lott wrote, "Hitchens refuses to make a full-throated case for faith. He explains that 'those who choose to argue in prose ... are unlikely to be receptive to a case that is most effectively couched in poetry' ... Peter does hope that Christopher might one day arrive at some sort of acceptance that belief in God is not necessarily a character fault—and that religion does not poison everything".

One mix of the two audiences is the British writer, Theodore Dalrymple, reviewing The Rage Against God and Christopher Hitchens' Hitch-22 for the American journal First Things. Dalrymple writes, Peter Hitchens "has discovered that it is he, and not just the world, that was and is imperfect and that therefore humility is a virtue, even if one does not always live up to it. The first sentence of his first chapter reads, "I set fire to my Bible on the playing fields of my Cambridge boarding school one bright, windy spring afternoon in 1967". One senses the deep—and, in my view, healthy—feeling of self-disgust with which he wrote this, for indeed it describes an act of wickedness. Peter's memoir ... is more personally searching."

== Release details ==
The book was first published in the UK on 15 March 2010 by Continuum Publishing Corporation, and was released in the US in June 2010 by Zondervan, with the additional subtitle How Atheism Led Me to Faith.

== See also ==
- Christian apologetics
- Criticism of atheism
- Human rights in the Soviet Union

== Bibliography ==
- Chamberlin, William (2007). Russia's Iron Age. Little, Brown. ISBN 978-1-4067-6820-6.
- Hitchens, Christopher (2007). God Is Not Great. Twelve books. ISBN 978-1-84354-574-3.
- Hitchens, Peter (2010). The Rage Against God. Continuum Publishing Corporation. ISBN 978-1-4411-0572-1.
