= Hey Mr. Dream Maker =

1976 single by Cliff Richard

- Cover of the German release

Single by Cliff Richard

from the album Every Face Tells a Story
- B-side: "No One Waits"
- Released: 6 November 1976
- Recorded: 18 September 1976
- Studio: EMI Studios, London
- Genre: Soft rock
- Length: 4:48
- Label: EMI
- Songwriter(s): Bruce Welch; Alan Tarney
- Producer(s): Bruce Welch

Cliff Richard singles chronology
"I Can't Ask for Anymore Than You" (1976)	"Hey Mr. Dream Maker" (1976)	"My Kinda Life" (1977)

Music video
- "Hey Mr. Dream Maker" on YouTube

"Hey Mr. Dream Maker" (in some releases as "Hey Mr. Dreammaker") is a song by Cliff Richard from his album Every Face Tells a Story and the first single to be released from the album. It was released as a single in 1976 reaching number 31 on the UK Singles Chart. It was a top ten hit in South Africa reaching number 6.

== Track listing ==
7": EMI / EMI 2499

1. "Hey Mr. Dream Maker" – 4:48
2. "No One Waits" – 3:41

== Personnel ==
- Cliff Richard – vocals
- Terry Britten – guitar
- Alan Tarney – bass
- Brian Bennett – drums, percussion
- Graham Todd – keyboards
- Frank Ricotti – percussion
- Tony Rivers – backing vocals, vocal arrangement
- John Perry – backing vocals

== Chart performance ==
Chart (1976–77)	Peak position
Australia (Kent Music Report)	82
Netherlands (Dutch Top 40)	22
Netherlands (Single Top 100)	21
New Zealand (Recorded Music NZ)	34
South Africa (Springbok Radio)	6
UK Singles (OCC)	31

== Covers ==
The song was covered by Olivia Newton-John in her album Don't Stop Believin' (album) released on 30 October 1976 being her first album to be recorded in Nashville.
