= The Broken Compass =

2009 political book by Peter Hitchens

The Broken Compass: How British Politics Lost its Way
- Author: Peter Hitchens
- Subject: British politics
- Genre: Non-fiction
- Publisher: Continuum International Publishing Group Ltd.
- Publication date: 11 May 2009
- Publication place: United Kingdom
- Pages: 236
- ISBN: 978-1-84706-405-9
- OCLC: 288986269
- LC Class: JN238 .H58 2009
- Preceded by: A Brief History of Crime
- Followed by: The Rage Against God

The Broken Compass: How British Politics Lost its Way is the fourth book by British writer Peter Hitchens, published in May 2009. Polemical and partly autobiographical, the book contends that the British political right and left no longer hold firm, adversarial beliefs, but vie for position in the centre, while at the same time overseeing a general decline in British society.

Hitchens depicts the right in particular as a confused and spent political force that has supposedly been subsumed by the centre-left, particularly Fabian social democracy. As a result of these factors, he suggests that "there is no longer any debate between the political parties about issues that have divided thinkers down the ages, and divide the population even now". Hitchens concludes that, since the compass is broken, the time has come in British politics for the re-establishment of a proper adversarial system and for principles to be rediscovered.

In the media, The Broken Compass received mostly negative reviews from left-leaning outlets and some other newspapers, and was largely ignored by the conservative press. It was reissued as The Cameron Delusion in March 2010, two months before David Cameron became the British Prime Minister.

== Background ==
Hitchens sets out his stall in the preface "The Lost Frontier", stating: "conventional wisdom is almost always wrong. By the time it has become conventional, it has ceased to be wisdom and become cant. Its smug cousin, received opinion, is just as bad. The aim of this book is to defy these two enemies of thought and reason", and "conventional wisdom's biggest single mistake is its thought-free, obsolete idea of Left and Right".

== Synopsis ==
=== Part I: The New Permanent Government of Britain ===
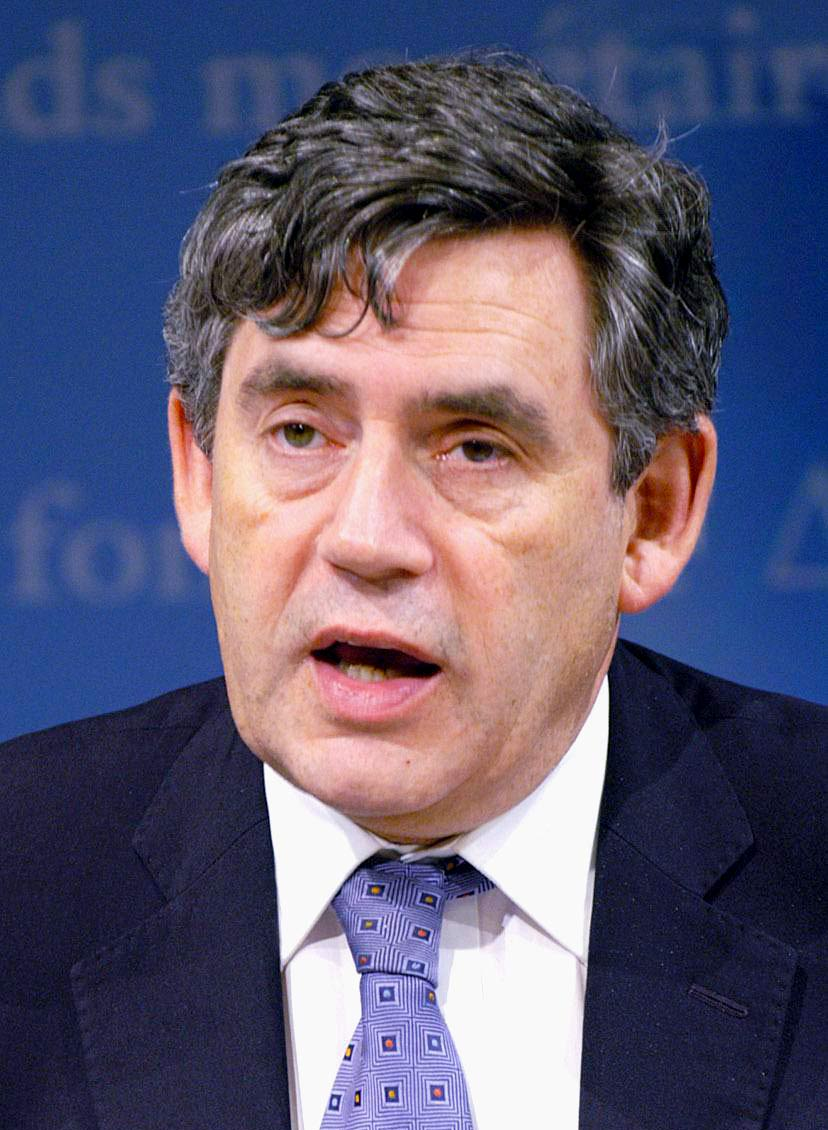
In The Broken Compass Hitchens criticises the media's portrayal of Gordon Brown.

In Chapter 1, "Guy Fawkes Gets a Blackberry", Hitchens claims that opinion polls are a device for influencing public opinion and not measuring it, and that political parties and newspapers are responsible for this manipulation, whose purpose is to "bring about the thing it claims is already happening". The author cites contemporary examples of the media attacking Gordon Brown and the expected win of the Conservative Party at the 2010 general election. Hitchens begins Chapter 2, "The Power of Lunch", by asserting, based on his time as a reporter at Westminster, that political journalists are uninterested in serious political debate; propagate received centre-left standpoints on issues; and consult with each other and politicians about media stories. Chapter 3, "Time for a Change", describes how a media reporting bias is attempting to facilitate a Tory general election win. Hitchens states one of his motivations in writing the book was to frustrate this exercise. Hitchens claims in Chapter 4, "Fear of Finding Something Worse", that Labour has reached "the most significant moment in its history – the complete acceptance of its programme by the Conservatives". The author invokes the closing image of George Orwell's Animal Farm to illustrate how close the two parties have become. Chapter 5, "The Great Landslide", discusses how a number of left-leaning writers and newspapers have allegedly begun describing the Conservatives in favourable terms, and how this no longer constituted "a form of treason".

=== Part II: The Left Escapes to the West ===
Chapter 6, "Riding the Prague Tram", describes Hitchens's experience of travelling in Communist Bloc countries before the fall of the Soviet Union and how this, combined with the behaviour of certain left-wing organisations in the UK, led to his becoming disillusioned with the British Left. He also carries out a lengthy critique of the Western Left's apologist stance towards Soviet Communism, including views held by Fabian Society members Beatrice and Maurice Webb; the attempt to exonerate and romanticise Lenin and Trotsky; and intellectual resistance to the works of Alexander Solzhenitsyn and Robert Conquest. In Chapter 7, "A Fire Burning Under Water", Hitchens describes the final stage in his becoming disenchanted with the British Left – the British Trades Union Congress's (TUC) alleged failure to support the Gdańsk shipyard workers challenging the Soviet-aligned government.

=== Part III: Britain Through the Looking Glass ===
Chapter 8, "Racism, Sexism and Homophobia", examines how the modern ideology of race and the term racist differ from the previous concept of "racialism", and how the sexual revolution represents "seeking the existing order's permission to pursue pleasure at all costs", which undermines Christian principles of marriage, and has its roots in events in 1968. In Chapter 9, "Sexism is Rational", Hitchens states that the Left's taking up feminist causes since the 1960s has led to the damage and exploitation of women, as well as a decline in marriage. Hitchens says this process is part of revolutionaries' seeking to "destroy and expunge the restraints placed on human selfishness by the Christian religion. The permanent married family is the greatest single obstacle to this". Hitchens concludes that in Britain there is an emerging citizenry "prepared for enslavement, ignorant of its origins, past, rights, traditions, and duties" and that "only in a wholly broken political system could there be such a need for reform, and no reformers ready to address it".

In Chapter 10, "Equality or Tolerance", Hitchens examines how the Left have since the 1960s taken up the cause of equal rights for homosexuals. Hitchens claims supporters of Leo Abse's 1967 law reform on homosexuality are now accused of intolerance if they do not support homosexual civil partnerships or discrimination on the grounds of homosexuality. Hitchens concludes by stating, "the atrophy of religion and patriotism in the Labour party, like the atrophy of the same things in the Tory Party, is the deep problem beneath all others". Chapter 11, "The Fall of the Meritocracy", examines falling standards in British education. Hitchens cites the abolition of grammar schools as one of the main causes, which has also resulted in a decline in social mobility. Hitchens claims egalitarians deny these consequences and that comprehensive education has failed. Hitchens also quotes a 2000 study, which asserted that "the general lowering of standards and rigour since the end of selection is one of the main reasons behind the current drive to devalue examinations". Hitchens asks why, "the educated, conscious servants of the state should seek to pretend that educational standards are rising when the opposite is true. The answer is that they have put equality before education". Chapter 12, "'The age of the train'", outlines how the Conservative and Labour parties facilitated the dismantling of much of Britain's rail network. Hitchens asserts this is evidence that the "Tory Party does not love Britain, any more than the Labour Party loves the poor". The chapter also provides a conservative argument against mass car ownership, saying that "roads destroy and distort established ways of living", while "the traditional English town, with its defined centre, ancient street pattern and comfortable shape, was not destroyed by the coming of the railway. It was enhanced". In Chapter 13, "A Comfortable Hotel on the Road to Damascus", Hitchens explores how since the 2001 September 11 attacks and the 2003 Invasion of Iraq, certain commentators on the left realigned with an American neoconservative position, which, "delivers him [the leftist commentator] to another portion of the 'centre ground', one where foreign policy is the only thing worth discussing, and where former conservatives and former Leftists can mingle in happy communion", and allows "political conservatism to soothe its tribal base by appearing strong overseas, while failing to be anything of the kind at home".

=== Conclusion: The Broken Compass ===
Hitchens asserts that political mismanagement, facilitated by an abandonment of the adversarial system, has resulted in an overall decline in British society. He identifies the end of the Cold War (which "made many of the old political positions meaningless overnight") as one cause of this, as well as the implementation of the ideas of Fabian social democracy and the ideology of the 1960s.

== Reception ==
On publication the book was reviewed in The Guardian, The Observer and the New Statesman, was the occasion of two interviews with Hitchens with Hannah Pool in The Guardian, and the topic of a discussion with the author on BBC Radio 4.

The reviews in the left-leaning press were generally unfavourable; Peter Wilby's review in The Observer was dismissive towards much of the book's contents. Wilby wrote "As Hitchens sees it, 'the broken compass' is chiefly the Conservatives' fault. Even under Thatcher, they accepted too many of Labour's social democratic and liberal reforms. So we have a permanent government of the centre and one of Labour's main aims is to stop a genuinely Conservative party emerging that may attract working-class votes on such issues as "immigration and disorder" and getting Britain out of Europe. 'It was greatly in Labour's interest, once the Tory party had accepted so much of Labour's programme as unalterable, that the Tory party should be preserved against the danger of dissolution,' Hitchens writes. There is a grain of truth in all this, but on the left most would reverse the argument. The postwar consensus was destroyed in the Thatcher years and Labour failed to restore it, accepting, at least until the credit crunch, unrestrained neoliberal capitalism. New Labour's appeal to business and the city was that it closed off, perhaps forever, the possibility of a genuinely socialist alternative".

Writing in the New Statesman, Anthony Howard saw the book as "a hotchpotch of separate essays" and that, though Hitchens mounts a spirited defence of his beliefs, he nevertheless resembles "some faintly out-of-date figure searching the kitchen for any pot or pan he can hurl against the spirit of the age". In a review in The Guardian, Steven Poole described Hitchens as being "in general exhilaratingly good when attacking the hypocrisies and stupidities of specific individuals", and wrote that the "best parts" of the book describe "scenes of foreign reporting, such as an alarming visit to Vilnius in 1991, where Soviet forces massacred Lithuanian nationalists". However, Poole also added that the book resorted too much to cultural generalisation.

Revised edition, published as The Cameron Delusion

Conservative newspapers and magazines, which had consistently reviewed Hitchens's previous books, largely ignored The Broken Compass. An exception to this trend was the Shadow Education Secretary Michael Gove referring at length to the book in his column in The Times, where he wrote that it "has some passages of quite brilliant writing and it is at its best when Peter reflects on his own life and his disillusionment with the left-wing ideology of his youth" and that the book "makes some telling points, which are discomfiting reading for conservatives who value grace and civility in our national life".

== Release details ==
The book was first published in the UK on 11 May 2009 by Continuum International Publishing Group Ltd., and in the US on 20 June 2009 by Continuum, with the altered subtitle How Left and Right Lost Their Meaning. In anticipation of the 2010 general election, a revised paperback edition with the new title The Cameron Delusion was released in the UK on 17 March 2010.

== Index ==
Steven Poole in his Guardian review wrote that "Hitchens should at least be applauded for taking the trouble to provide an amusing index, a duty shirked by too many authors." The index was the subject of a full-page parody by Craig Brown in the magazine Private Eye.

== Bibliography ==
- Hitchens, Peter (2009). The Broken Compass: How British Politics Lost its Way. Continuum International Publishing Group Ltd. ISBN 978-1-84706-405-9.
- Hitchens, Peter (2010). The Cameron Delusion (Updated ed.). Continuum. ISBN 9781441135056.
