= Peter Hitchens =

English journalist and author (born 1951)

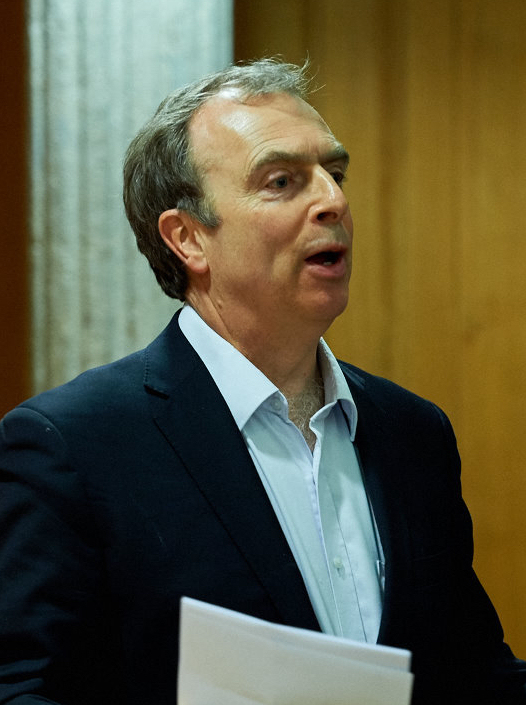
- Hitchens in 2015
- Born: Peter Jonathan Hitchens; 28 October 1951 (age 75); Sliema, Crown Colony of Malta
- Education: Alcuin College, York (BA)
- Occupations: Journalist; author
- Political party: International Socialists (1969–1975); Labour (1977–1983); Conservative (1997–2003)
- Spouse: Eve Ross (m. 1983)
- Children: 3, including Dan
- Relatives: Christopher Hitchens (brother)
- Awards: Orwell Prize (2010)

Peter Jonathan Hitchens (born 28 October 1951) is an English author, broadcaster, journalist, and commentator. He writes for The Mail on Sunday and was a foreign correspondent reporting from both Moscow and Washington, D.C. Hitchens has contributed to The Spectator, The American Conservative, The Guardian, First Things, Prospect, The Critic and the New Statesman.

A conservative, Hitchens has authored several books critiquing the erosion of British institutions and values, including The Abolition of Britain (1999), which criticises the social and constitutional revolution under New Labour; The Rage Against God (2010), recounting his intellectual journey from Marxist atheism to faith amid the collapse of the Soviet Union and critiquing the New Atheists; The War We Never Fought (2012), criticising drug culture and challenging the idea that there had been a 'war on drugs' in Britain; and The Phoney Victory (2018), which questions and challenges what Hitchens regards as Britain's national myths about the Second World War's legacy.

Previously a Marxist-Trotskyist and supporter of the Labour Party, Hitchens became more conservative during the 1990s. He joined the Conservative Party in 1997 and left in 2003, and has since been deeply critical of the party, which he views as the foremost obstacle to true conservatism in Britain.

Hitchens identifies with an older strain of British conservatism shaped by Burkean scepticism, Christian moral teaching, and a degree of Gaullist national self-assertion, describing himself as a Burkean conservative, a social democrat, and an Anglo-Gaullist. He argues for a strong nation state, local institutions, and a social order grounded in Christian morality, duty, and self-restraint. His conservative positions often place him at odds with late-twentieth-century liberalisation in areas such as family law and drug policy, and he has been a prominent critic of what he sees as the moral and cultural decline in modern Britain and the progressive cultural revolution since the 1960s. He is an advocate of a return to academic selection and the reintroduction of grammar schools into the English education system. He also opposed aspects of the British government’s response to the COVID-19 pandemic, including national lockdown measures and mask mandates, on civil-libertarian and evidential grounds.

== Background ==
=== Early life and family ===
Peter Jonathan Hitchens was born on 28 October 1951 in Sliema, Malta, where his father, Eric Ernest Hitchens (1909–1987), a naval officer, was stationed as part of the then Mediterranean Fleet of the Royal Navy. His mother, Yvonne Jean Hitchens (née Hickman; 1921–1973), had met Eric while serving in the Women's Royal Naval Service (Wrens) during the Second World War. Hitchens has Jewish ancestry via his maternal grandmother, a daughter of Polish Jewish migrants. His grandmother revealed this fact upon meeting his wife Eve Ross. Though his older brother, Christopher, was quick to embrace his Jewish identity following the principle of matrilineal descent, Peter noted that they were only one-32nd Jewish by descent, and has not identified as Jewish himself.

In his youth, Hitchens wanted to be an officer in the Royal Navy, like his father. However, when he was 10, he learned he had a lazy eye that could not be corrected, thereby barring him from service.

Hitchens attended Mount House School, Tavistock, The Prebendal School, Chichester, The Leys School, and the Oxford College of Further Education before being accepted at the University of York, where he studied Philosophy and Politics and was a member of Alcuin College, graduating in 1973.

Hitchens married Eve Ross in 1983. They have a daughter and two sons. Their elder son, Dan, was editor of the Catholic Herald, a London-based Roman Catholic newspaper, and is now Senior Editor of First Things. Hitchens lives with his wife in Oxford.

=== Religion ===
Hitchens was brought up in the Christian faith and attended Christian boarding schools but became an atheist, beginning to leave his faith at 15. He returned to church later in life, and is now an Anglican and a member of the Church of England.

=== Relationship with his brother ===
External videos
- Debate with Christopher and Peter Hitchens on The Abolition of Britain, 14 October 1999, C-SPAN

Hitchens' only sibling was the journalist and author Christopher Hitchens, who was two years older. Christopher said in 2005 that the main difference between the two was the belief in the existence of God. Peter was a member of the International Socialists (forerunners of the modern Socialist Workers' Party) from 1968 to 1975 (beginning at age 17) after Christopher introduced him to them. The brothers fell out after Peter wrote a 2001 article in The Spectator which allegedly characterised Christopher as a Stalinist.

After the birth of Peter's third child the two brothers reconciled. Peter's review of his brother's book God Is Not Great led to a public argument between the brothers, but no renewed estrangement.

In 2007 the brothers appeared as panellists on BBC TV's Question Time, where they clashed on a number of issues. In 2008 in the United States they debated the 2003 invasion of Iraq and the existence of God. In 2010 at the Pew Research Center, the pair debated the nature of God in civilisation. At a memorial service for Christopher after his death in 2011, Peter read St Paul's Epistle to the Philippians 4:8 which Christopher had read at their father's funeral.

== Journalism ==
Christopher helped Peter to begin a career in journalism at the Socialist Worker. Its editor Roger Protz recalled that Peter "was as dry as a stick, and had no personality of any sort".

Hitchens joined the Labour Party in 1977 but left shortly after campaigning for Ken Livingstone in 1979, thinking it was wrong to carry a party card when directly reporting politics, and coinciding with a culmination of growing personal disillusionment with the Labour movement.

Hitchens worked for the local press in Swindon and then at the Coventry Evening Telegraph. He then worked for the Daily Express between 1977 and 2000, initially as a reporter specialising in education and industrial and labour affairs, then as a political reporter, and subsequently as deputy political editor. Leaving parliamentary journalism to cover defence and diplomatic affairs, he reported on the decline and collapse of communist regimes in several Warsaw Pact countries, which culminated in a stint as Moscow correspondent and reporting on life there during the final months of the Soviet Union and the early years of the Russian Federation in 1990–92. He took part in reporting the 1992 general election, closely following Neil Kinnock. He then became the Daily Express Washington correspondent. Returning to Britain in 1995, he became a commentator and columnist.

Hitchens reported from Somalia at the time of the United Nations intervention in the Somali Civil War.

In 2000 Hitchens left the Daily Express after its acquisition by Richard Desmond, stating that working for him would have represented a moral conflict of interest. Hitchens joined The Mail on Sunday, where he has a weekly column and weblog in which he debates directly with readers. Hitchens has also written for The Spectator and The American Conservative magazines, and occasionally for The Guardian, Prospect, and the New Statesman.

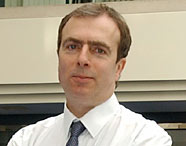
Hitchens in 2006

After being shortlisted in 2007 and 2009, Hitchens won the Orwell Prize in political journalism in 2010. Peter Kellner, one of the Orwell Prize judges, described Hitchens's writing as being "as firm, polished and potentially lethal as a Guardsman's boot."

A regular on British radio and television, Hitchens has been on Question Time, Any Questions?, This Week, The Daily Politics, and The Big Questions. He has authored and presented four documentaries; one on the BBC about Euroscepticism, and three on Channel 4, including one on the surveillance state, and critical examinations of Nelson Mandela and David Cameron. In the late 1990s Hitchens co-presented a programme on Talk Radio UK with Derek Draper and Austin Mitchell.

In 2010 Hitchens was described by Edward Lucas in The Economist as "a forceful, tenacious, eloquent and brave journalist. He lambasts woolly thinking and crooked behaviour at home and abroad." In 2009 Anthony Howard wrote of Hitchens, "the old revolutionary socialist has lost nothing of his passion and indignation as the years have passed us all by. It is merely the convictions that have changed, not the fervour and fanaticism with which they continue to be held."

== Political views ==
Hitchens describes himself as a Burkean conservative, a social democrat and more recently, a British Gaullist. In 2010 Michael Gove, writing in The Times, asserted that, for Hitchens, what is more important than the split between the Left and the Right is "the deeper gulf between the restless progressive and the Christian pessimist." Hitchens joined the Conservative Party in 1997 and left in 2003. This was when he challenged Michael Portillo for the Conservative nomination in the Kensington and Chelsea seat in 1999.

In 2025 a profile in the Oxford University student newspaper Cherwell asserted that: "Like Edmund Burke, he [Hitchens] possesses an instinctive preference towards ideas and systems which have evolved naturally, over time, from the bottom-up, and he views with suspicion their shiny premanufactured counterparts. Thus, common law, imperial measurements, grammar schools, and the first-past-the-post system are always preferable to civil law, metric measurements, comprehensive schools, and proportional representation. [...] By ruling out conventional perspectives and accepting that not all progress is good, Hitchens attains a clear-sightedness which more mainstream commentators have missed."

He has been consistently dismissive of the modern Conservative Party since the 1990s. This is because he believes that the party has since abandoned true social conservatism. His view is that conservatism should embody a Burkean sense of public duty, conscience, and the rule of law, which he sees as the best guarantee of liberty. Furthermore, this view holds a general hostility to hasty constitutional reforms and foreign adventurism. This was central to his criticism of many policies of the New Labour government, which he viewed as attacks on liberty and facets of a constitutional revolution. He believes the Conservative Party should be a defender of establishment institutions such as the Church of England and the monarchy, but has shifted to social liberalism instead. He believes that atheism and cultural liberalism are the causes of the systematic undermining of Christianity. Hitchens has written "The left's real interests are moral, cultural, sexual and social. They lead to a powerful state. This is not because they actively set out to achieve one." He also believes that the First World War and the devolution of marriage are the causes of the demise of Christianity in Europe.

In his book The Cameron Delusion Hitchens argues that in the last few decades, the Conservative Party has become virtually "indistinguishable from Blairite New Labour". He argues that the Conservative Party's reason for existence is as "a vehicle for obtaining office for the sons of gentlemen" and he loathes the party. Hitchens's claim that the "Conservatives are now the main Left-wing party in the country" in his Mail on Sunday column has been met with criticism.

He is in favour of capital punishment, and was the only British journalist to attend and write about the execution of British-born Nicholas Ingram in America in 1995. In a 2025 article, he wrote that:

If you seek office and the power that goes with it, your most pressing task is to stand between your fellow countrymen and evil. To do that, you must maintain armed forces capable of lethal violence and ready to inflict it. If you lack the courage and resolve to do this, then do not seek office in the first place. You are not qualified for it. The apparatus of the death penalty has exactly the same purpose, to defend the weak and good against the strong and evil, by placing a sharp sword in the hands of justice. This point also disposes of the most popular argument against the death penalty, the fear of executing the wrong person. This is indeed a strong point. It is why, now that our courts have been turned into a shameful politicised and emotionalised travesty of justice, I could not possibly support the return of the gallows until major reforms have taken place.

He supports first-past-the-post voting. He is opposed to the privatisation of railways and water and supports their renationalisation. Hitchens describes himself as a "lifelong trade unionist".

Hitchens has been a member of the campaign to clear the name of Bishop of Chichester, George Bell, from allegations of child sexual abuse. He has argued that the Church of England convicted him in what he described as a kangaroo court, and stated his wish that allegations are not treated as proven facts.

Hitchens "completely" opposes the Right to Buy scheme introduced by Margaret Thatcher, describing it as a "grave mistake" and advocates for replacing Housing Benefit, which he describes as an "absolute scandal", with a substantial increase in public housing.

He is a supporter of grammar schools and the principle of academic selection. He has argued for their reintroduction, reform and expansion since the 1990s, and has criticised progressive educational reforms for "wrecking" the education system of Britain. In Hitchens' view, both left and right were united in their opposition to grammar schools but for different reasons: the left, because the academic success of grammar schools expose the failure of comprehensive education and contradict the egalitarian ideal by proving that academic selection works. The modern right, meanwhile, resent grammars because they restrain the market logic they prefer, since academically selective state schools reduce demand for expensive private schooling and weaken the social advantages that the affluent expect to be able to purchase.

== Writings and thought ==
=== War and terrorism ===
He was opposed to the NATO intervention in Kosovo and 2003 US-led invasion of Iraq, arguing that neither was in the interests of either Britain or the United States, and opposed the war in Afghanistan.

Hitchens has argued that Britain should never have participated in the First World War, and is very critical of the view that the Second World War was "The Good War". His view on the latter war is laid out in his book The Phoney Victory, in which he argues that Britain entered too early, and that Britain overly glorifies its role within the war. He argues that while the Allies were fighting a radical evil, they sometimes used immoral methods, such as the carpet bombing of German civilians. He believes that Britain's entry into the Second World War led to the country’s subsequent rapid decline. This was because, among other matters, it could not finance the war and was not prepared for it. As a result, it had to surrender much of its wealth and power to avoid bankruptcy. British historian Richard J. Evans criticised Hitchens’ book, claiming that The Phoney Victory was 'riddled with errors'. Hitchens responded to Evans' review on Hitchens’ blog.

Hitchens is not anti-war or a pacifist, since he believes that this position often leaves countries defenceless in times of war. Instead, he argues that military power and the threat of war can be deterrents against war. Hitchens wrote about his concern of the use of security (anti-terrorism) legislation and increased police powers under New Labour, and how it has been used to suppress civil liberties. In Channel 4's Dispatches, Hitchens said the result of this legislation was that Britain ended up "sleepwalking into a Big Brother state".

=== European Union ===
Hitchens is critical of the European Union (EU) and argued for many years, before Brexit, that Britain would be better off outside it. In 2017 he endorsed the Flexcit model proposed by Richard North and Christopher Booker as the most sensible and moderate way to leave the EU while remaining in the European Economic Area to preserve the economic benefits of EU membership. However, he did not vote in the 2016 EU membership referendum because he is critical of referendums on principle. Instead of a referendum, he argued that a leave decision would be best done by voting into power a political party whose manifesto committed the country to withdrawal by an act of Parliament.

=== Vaccination ===
Hitchens was against the MMR vaccine following the Lancet MMR autism fraud. He asked in a 2001 article: "Is it really our duty to risk our children's lives with this jab?" In 2013, he defended this earlier article, saying he was criticising "State bossiness in an age that has seen a catalogue of mistakes, panics and mysteries in the world of disease and medicine" and referred to the thalidomide scandal. He has defended the discredited former doctor Andrew Wakefield.

After being vaccinated against COVID-19 in 2021, Hitchens rejected accusations he is an anti-vaxxer, but said that he was "more or less forced to have an immunisation I would not normally have bothered with".

=== War on drugs ===
Hitchens has written about the enforcement of drug laws, most notably in his book The War We Never Fought (2012). He advocates harsher penalties properly enforced for possession and illegal use of cannabis, saying that "cannabis has been mis-sold as a soft and harmless substance when in fact it's potentially extremely dangerous." He is opposed to the decriminalisation of recreational drugs in general. In 2012 Hitchens gave evidence to the Parliamentary Home Affairs Select Committee as part of its inquiry into drugs policy, and called for the British government to introduce a more hard-line policy on drugs. Hitchens disagrees with the notion of drug addiction, arguing that it goes against the notion of free will. He says: "People take drugs because they enjoy it."

=== Marriage ===
Hitchens’s writing on marriage centres on his view that legal and cultural changes since the 1960s have undermined the stability of the traditional family. In The Abolition of Britain (1999) he argues that reforms such as the introduction of no-fault divorce weakened marriage by turning it from a binding public commitment into a private contract that could be easily dissolved, a change he believes has had damaging effects on children, public morality and social order. In The Rage Against God (2010) he links the decline of marriage to what he regards as the retreat of Christian moral teaching from British public life. Hitchens has repeatedly maintained that the state should reinforce lifelong marriage rather than, in his words, "administering its collapse", and has criticised successive governments for policies that he believes normalise family breakdown and expand state involvement in parenting.

Hitchens was one of the most outspoken opponents of same-sex marriage in 2013, the year before same-sex marriage was made legal in England, Wales, and Scotland. In speaking to the journalist Owen Jones in 2015, he said his real issue was with the decline of heterosexual marriage in society and the legalisation "of what was in effect no-fault divorce", and that same-sex marriage is "a side-effect ... It's a consequence of the collapse of heterosexual marriage, and I regret now getting involved in the argument about same-sex marriage, because it was a Stalingrad, a diversion. Why is one worrying about a few thousand people who want to have same-sex marriages, without being at all concerned about the collapse of heterosexual marriage, which involves millions of people, and millions of children?"

He described the debate over same-sex marriage as a "trap", writing in March 2012, "Why should we care so much about stopping a few hundred homosexuals getting married, when we cannot persuade legions of heterosexuals to stay married? It is a complete loss of proportion. This is why I use the metaphor of Stalingrad, a stupid distraction from the main war, with which generals and politicians alike became so obsessed that they poured all their resources into it. I would urge my fellow moral conservatives not to rush into this trap. But as proper conservatism of all kinds is probably doomed anyway in this country, they might as well go down fighting."

In 2019 the University of Buckingham organised a "free-speech society" after Hitchens was no-platformed by the University of Portsmouth over his views on same-sex marriage, which they believed would cause conflict with LGBT events elsewhere on campus. Hitchens was the first guest invited by the society to address students. In response to his being no-platformed by the University of Portsmouth, Hitchens was invited by the Archivist and the Head of History and Politics at The Portsmouth Grammar School to give a short talk on "The myth of Russian aggression" to Sixth Form pupils.

=== Environment ===
Hitchens has claimed that "the greenhouse effect probably doesn't exist" and that the scientific consensus linking global warming to human activity has not been proven, describing it as "modish dogma".

He has criticised what he considers an overreliance on wind power in the United Kingdom due to its intermittent nature, and argued in 2015 that its further expansion put Britain at risk of rolling electricity blackouts in the future. He is also opposed to the UK government's push to reach net zero by 2030, arguing that it will drive up energy prices to a point where people will be unable to afford to heat their homes. He has also claimed that UK emissions are minor in comparison to China's, and that any focus on reductions in carbon emissions should be targeted at China rather than the UK.

=== COVID-19 pandemic ===
Hitchens has repeatedly criticised the British government's response to the COVID-19 pandemic. He has particularly criticised COVID-19 lockdowns in the UK, suggesting they would have negative consequences and questioning their epidemiological efficacy. Critics have described him as a "lockdown sceptic". Full Fact evaluated his statement, where he said it was "not possible" for the first lockdown in March to cause the peak in daily infections and deaths to decline, in a fact-checking article, and concluded that this was "wrong" based on available evidence.

Hitchens' view was disputed by journalist Paul Mason in the New Statesman. Environmental activist George Monbiot in The Guardian also critiqued Hitchens' views, calling for them to be censored. Daniel Hannan meanwhile expressed agreement with Hitchens in The Daily Telegraph. A tweet by Hitchens stating four fifths of cases were asymptomatic was called "misleading" by Voice of America. Hitchens criticised Imperial College London modelling, which suggested that there could be up to 500,000 COVID-19 deaths if the government did not impose a lockdown.

He supported the Swedish government’s response to the pandemic. He opposed the mandatory wearing of face masks during the pandemic, referring to them as "muzzles". Hitchens also believes that government mandates to wear face coverings are authoritarian, since the government is interfering with people's freedom to wear what they choose under penalty of imprisonment. He has been accused of promoting misinformation about the pandemic and public health restrictions by several sources.

=== English independence ===
Hitchens has spoken in favour of English nationalism, arguing that the United Kingdom should be dissolved and England should become an independent country once again.

=== Russia and Ukraine ===
In 2010, Hitchens argued that Crimea should be part of Russia rather than Ukraine, stating that the peninsula is historically Russian. In November 2022 he said that there exists a "virulent" nationalism in Ukraine, and that it is easier "to be a non-Scot in Scotland" than "an ethnic Russian in Ukraine" due to the "ugly strain of Ukrainian nationalism that made life difficult for ethnic Russians in Ukraine."

Hitchens has stated that Ukraine should not join NATO. He is also against providing military aid to Ukraine, having stated: "The conflict in Ukraine was always unnecessary. It has done nothing but harm to Ukraine and Ukrainians. Ukraine has been used as a battering ram in someone else's quarrel." Hitchens called for peace negotiations between Ukraine and Russia.

Hitchens has been a vocal supporter of the pro-Russian British journalist Graham Phillips in his fight against being sanctioned by the government of the United Kingdom. Although expressing criticism of Phillips and his work, Hitchens has been strongly critical of the British government, describing Phillips's fight against sanctions as "liberty fighting tyranny" and "one of the most important court cases of our time". Writing in support of Phillips and Julian Assange in March 2024 Hitchens described Phillips as a "prisoner of the (UK) state".

=== Lucy Letby ===
Hitchens has questioned the safety of the conviction of Lucy Letby.

== Publications ==
Hitchens is the author of The Abolition of Britain (1999) and A Brief History of Crime (2003), both critical of changes in British society since the 1950s. A compendium of his Daily Express columns was published as Monday Morning Blues in 2000. A Brief History of Crime was reissued as The Abolition of Liberty in April 2004, with an additional chapter on identity cards ("Your papers, please"), and with two chapters – on gun control ("Out of the barrel of a gun") and capital punishment ("Cruel and unusual") – removed.

The Broken Compass: How British Politics Lost its Way was published in May 2009, and The Rage Against God was published in Britain in March 2010, and in America in May. Hitchens's book The War We Never Fought: The British Establishment's Surrender to Drugs, about what he sees as the non-existence of the war on drugs, was published by Bloomsbury in the autumn of 2012.

In June 2014, Hitchens published his first e-book, Short Breaks in Mordor, a compendium of foreign reports. The Phoney Victory: The World War II Illusion was published in August 2018 by I.B. Tauris. It addresses what Hitchens views as the national myth of the Second World War, which he believes did long-term damage to Britain and its position in the world. It was negatively reviewed by the historian Richard Evans in the New Statesman, who described the book as "riddled with errors".

== Bibliography ==
- Booknotes interview with Hitchens on The Abolition of Britain, 31 December 2000, C-SPAN

- The Abolition of Britain (1999)
- Monday Morning Blues (2000)
- A Brief History of Crime (2003), updated in paperback as The Abolition of Liberty: The Decline of Order and Justice in England (2004)
- The Broken Compass (2009), updated in paperback as The Cameron Delusion (2010)
- The Rage Against God (2010)
- The War We Never Fought (2012)
- Short Breaks in Mordor (2014)
- The Phoney Victory (2018) ISBN 9781788313292
- Unconventional Wisdom (2020)
- A Revolution Betrayed: How Egalitarians Wrecked the British Education System (2022)

== See also ==
- Left-conservatism
- Traditionalist conservatism
