= A Brief History of Crime =

Book by Peter Hitchens

- Author: Peter Hitchens
- Language: English
- Subject: Crime, Capital punishment in the United Kingdom
- Publisher: Atlantic Books
- Publication date: 10 April 2003
- Publication place: United Kingdom
- Pages: 320
- ISBN: 1-84354-148-3
- Preceded by: Monday Morning Blues
- Followed by: The Broken Compass

A Brief History of Crime is the third book by author and journalist Peter Hitchens. Originally published in 2003, it was reissued in 2004 under the new title The Abolition of Liberty. The book was described in 2012 by The American Conservative magazine as "a must-read for anyone on either side of the Atlantic".

== Themes ==
The book challenges a number of commonly held views about the causes of crime, criticising the opinion that crime is caused by poverty or other forms of social deprivation. It also charts the changes in UK policing from the 1960s to the present day, and examines and criticises the workings of the modern British prison system, including a chapter on the author's visit to Wormwood Scrubs. Hitchens contends that the former principle of "due punishment of responsible persons" has been abandoned in favour of vague modern theories of rehabilitation. The book also counters widely accepted beliefs surrounding recreational drugs, capital punishment, institutional racism in UK policing and the importance of jury trial.

== Reception ==
Left-leaning publications were very critical of the book. David Rose in The Observer described the book as "a churning, ceaseless rant, akin to the wake of a cross-Channel ferry. It has similar bilious effects" and questioned whether the desperate situation described by Hitchens really exists, citing Oxford as an example.

Conservative newspapers assessed the book more favourably. Bryan Appleyard, writing in The Sunday Times, described it as "a marvellous, angry polemic" that accounts for and charts how the British Police force became so "institutionally bureaucratic, sullen, chippy and ineffectual". In The Sunday Telegraph, Theodore Dalrymple agreed with the main arguments in the book, writing "Mr Hitchens places the blame firmly where it belongs: on a supine and pusillanimous political establishment that, for four decades at least, has constantly retreated before the verbal onslaught of liberal intellectuals whose weapons have been mockery allied to sentimental guilt about their prosperous and comfortable lives, and whose aim has been to liberate themselves from personally irksome moral constraints, without regard to the consequences for those less favourably placed in society".

== Publishing history ==
The book was published by Atlantic Books, (ISBN 1-84354-148-3) in 2003. An updated edition, re-titled The Abolition of Liberty: The Decline of Order and Justice in England (ISBN 1-84354-149-1) and featuring a new chapter on identity cards ("Your papers, please"), and with two chapters – on gun control ("Out of the barrel of a gun") and capital punishment ("Cruel and unusual") – removed, appeared in April 2004. Hitchens said in his weblog in 2010 that the reason for removing the above chapters was so that the book "would be read more widely". The deleted chapters are restored in the audiobook.

== Bibliography ==
- Hitchens, Peter (2003). A Brief History of Crime (First hardcover ed.). London: Atlantic. ISBN 1-84354-148-3.
- Hitchens, Peter (2004). The Abolition of Liberty: The Decline of Order and Justice in England (Revised paperback ed.). London: Atlantic. ISBN 1843541491.
