= Eddie Money discography =

Cataloging of published recordings by Eddie Money

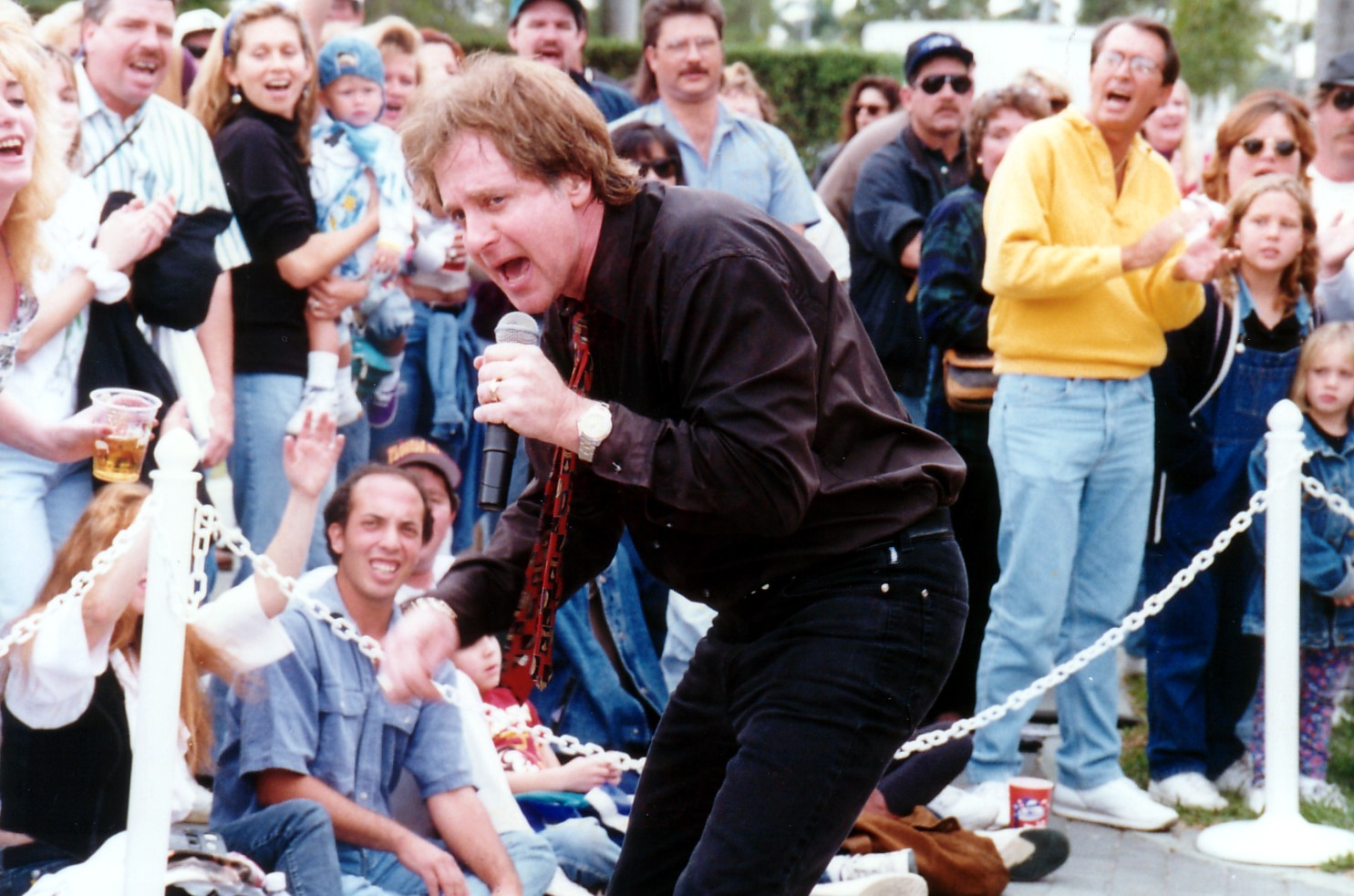
- Money performing in 2006
- Studio albums: 11
- Extended plays: 4
- Live albums: 2
- Compilation albums: 7
- Singles: 29

The discography of American rock musician Eddie Money consists of eleven studio albums, two live albums, four EPs, and twenty-nine singles. He also released seven compilation albums.

Money's self-titled debut album was released in late 1977. The album spawned three singles, all of which charted on the Billboard Hot 100. However, only the first two: "Baby Hold On" and "Two Tickets to Paradise", charted within the top 40. The third and final single, "You've Really Got a Hold on Me" placed outside the top 70. The album became his best-selling album to date, selling more than two million copies in the United States.

Subsequent albums were released between 1978 and 2007; however, none of those albums had the sales success of Eddie Money. He did, though, have success on the singles charts. In 1981, Billboard magazine introduced the Hot Mainstream Rock Tracks chart. Money's first single to chart there, "Think I'm in Love", became his first ever number-one single. He would additionally chart two more chart-toppers between 1986 and 1989, including 1986's "Take Me Home Tonight", which was his highest peaking single on the Hot 100, charting within the top 5 and 1988's "Walk on Water" charting at number 9. Money died in September 2019.

== Studio albums ==
| Title | Album details | Peak chart positions | | | Certifications (sales threshold) |
| Title | Album details | US | AUS | CAN | Certifications (sales threshold) |
|---|---|---|---|---|---|
| Eddie Money | Release date: 1977; Label: Columbia Records; Formats: LP, 8-track, cassette | 37 | 31 | 24 | US: 2× Platinum; CAN: Platinum |
| Life for the Taking | Release date: 1978; Label: Columbia; Formats: LP, 8-track, cassette | 17 | 64 | 13 | US: Platinum; CAN: Platinum |
| Playing for Keeps | Release date: 1980; Label: Columbia; Formats: LP, 8-track, cassette | 35 | — | 50 | |
| No Control | Release date: June 11, 1982; Label: Columbia; Formats: LP, 8-track, cassette | 20 | — | 36 | US: Platinum |
| Where's the Party? | Release date: 1983; Label: Columbia; Formats: LP, 8-track, cassette | 67 | — | — | |
| Can't Hold Back | Release date: 1986; Label: Columbia; Formats: LP, CD, cassette | 20 | — | 34 | US: Platinum; CAN: Gold |
| Nothing to Lose | Release date: October 4, 1988; Label: Columbia; Formats: LP, CD, cassette | 49 | — | — | |
| Right Here | Release date: 1991; Label: Columbia; Formats: LP, CD, cassette | 160 | 160 | 56 | |
| Love and Money | Release date: May 30, 1995; Label: Wolfgang; Formats: CD, cassette | — | — | — | |
| Ready Eddie | Release date: May 18, 1999; Label: CMC International; Formats: CD, cassette | — | — | — | |
| Wanna Go Back | Release date: March 13, 2007; Label: Warrior; Formats: CD, music download | — | — | — | |
"—" denotes releases that did not chart

== Compilation albums ==
| Title | Album details | Peak chart positions | | Certifications (sales threshold) |
| Title | Album details | US | CAN | Certifications (sales threshold) |
|---|---|---|---|---|
| Greatest Hits: The Sound of Money | Release date: November 1989; Label: Columbia Records; Formats: LP, CD, cassette | 53 | 62 | US: Gold |
| Good as Gold | Release date: 1996; Label: Yellow Label Records; Formats: CD, cassette | — | — | |
| Super Hits | Release date: August 26, 1997; Label: Columbia Records; Formats: CD, cassette | — | — | |
| The Best of Eddie Money | Release date: July 24, 2001; Label: Columbia/Legacy Recordings; Formats: CD | 48 | — | |
| Let's Rock and Roll the Place | Release date: March 23, 2003; Label: Sony BMG; Formats: CD | — | — | |
| The Essential Eddie Money | Release date: June 10, 2003; Label: Columbia/Legacy Recordings; Formats: CD | — | — | |
"—" denotes releases that did not chart

== Live albums ==
| Title | Album details |
|---|---|
| Shakin' with the Money Man | Release date: October 28, 1997; Label: Sanctuary Records; Formats: CD, cassette |
| Greatest Hits Live: The Encore Collection | Release date: November 3, 1998; Label: BMG Special Products; Formats: CD, cassette |
| Complete Eddie Money Live | Release date: March 20, 2000; Label: Calamari Records; Formats: CD, cassette |

== Extended plays ==
| Title | Album details |
|---|---|
| Unplug It In | Release date: November 3, 1992; Label: Columbia Records; Formats: CD, cassette |
| The Covers EP: Volume One | Release date: May 6, 2009; Label: Gigatone Records; Formats: digital download |
| The Covers EP: Volume Two | Release date: October 7, 2009; Label: Gigatone Records; Formats: digital download |
| Brand New Day | Release date: April 16, 2020; Label: Money Music, Inc.; Formats: digital download |

== Singles ==
| Year | Single | Peak chart positions | | | | | | | | Certifications (sales threshold) | Album |
| Year | Single | U.S. CB | U.S. BB | U.S. AC | US Main | AUS | CAN | GER | NL | Certifications (sales threshold) | Album |
|---|---|---|---|---|---|---|---|---|---|---|---|
| 1978 | "Baby Hold On" | 5 | 11 | — | — | 19 | 4 | — | 41 | | Eddie Money |
| 1978 | "Two Tickets to Paradise" | 20 | 22 | — | — | 86 | 14 | — | — | | Eddie Money |
| 1979 | "You've Really Got a Hold on Me" | 67 | 72 | — | — | — | 63 | — | — | | Eddie Money |
| 1979 | "Maybe I'm a Fool" | 25 | 22 | — | — | 51 | 28 | — | — | | Life for the Taking |
| 1979 | "Can't Keep a Good Man Down" | 65 | 63 | — | — | — | — | — | — | | Life for the Taking |
| 1979 | "Maureen" | 104 | — | — | — | — | — | — | — | | Life for the Taking |
| 1979 | "Get a Move On" | 55 | 46 | — | — | — | 59 | — | — | | Playing for Keeps |
| 1980 | "Let's Be Lovers Again" (Duet with Valerie Carter) | 86 | 65 | — | — | — | — | — | — | | Playing for Keeps |
| 1980 | "Running Back" | 91 | 78 | — | — | — | — | — | — | | Playing for Keeps |
| 1982 | "Think I'm in Love" | 21 | 16 | — | 1 | 54 | 11 | — | — | | No Control |
| 1982 | "No Control" | — | — | — | 60 | — | — | — | — | | No Control |
| 1982 | "Shakin'" | 62 | 63 | — | 9 | — | — | — | — | | No Control |
| 1983 | "The Big Crash" | 59 | 54 | — | 17 | — | — | — | — | | Where's the Party? |
| 1984 | "Club Michelle" | 77 | 66 | — | — | — | — | — | — | | Where's the Party? |
| 1984 | "I'm Movin On" | — | — | — | 25 | — | — | — | — | | Every Man Has a Woman |
| 1986 | "Take Me Home Tonight" | 5 | 4 | — | 1 | 46 | 15 | 59 | 43 | RMNZ: Gold | Can't Hold Back |
| 1986 | "I Wanna Go Back" | 15 | 14 | 33 | 3 | — | 42 | — | — | | Can't Hold Back |
| 1987 | "Endless Nights" | 25 | 21 | — | 10 | — | 76 | — | — | | Can't Hold Back |
| 1987 | "We Should Be Sleeping" | — | 90 | — | 18 | — | — | — | — | | Can't Hold Back |
| 1988 | "Walk on Water" | 7 | 9 | — | 2 | — | 10 | — | — | | Nothing to Lose |
| 1989 | "The Love in Your Eyes" | 15 | 24 | — | 1 | — | * | — | — | | Nothing to Lose |
| 1989 | "Forget About Love" | — | — | — | 36 | — | — | — | — | | Nothing to Lose |
| 1989 | "Let Me In" | 66 | 60 | — | 30 | — | — | — | — | | Nothing to Lose |
| 1990 | "Peace in Our Time" | 8 | 11 | 34 | 2 | — | 3 | — | — | | Greatest Hits: The Sound of Money |
| 1991 | "Heaven in the Back Seat" | 52 | 58 | — | 6 | — | 35 | — | — | | Right Here |
| 1991 | "I'll Get By" | 6 | 21 | 7 | — | — | 15 | — | — | | Right Here |
| 1992 | "She Takes My Breath Away" | — | — | — | 5 | — | 64 | — | — | | Right Here |
| 1992 | "Fall in Love Again" | 47 | 54 | 16 | — | — | 52 | — | — | | Right Here |
| 1993 | "Save a Little Room in Your Heart for Me" | — | 102 (Note: "Save a Little Room in Your Heart for Me" did not enter the US Billboard Hot 100 but did peak at number two on the Bubbling Under Hot 100 extension chart.) | — | — | — | — | — | — | | Unplug It In |
| 1999 | "Don't Say No Tonight" | — | — | — | — | — | — | — | — | | Ready Eddie |
| 2008 | "Gimme Some Water" (featuring Vince Gill) | — | — | — | — | — | — | — | — | | Non-album single |
| 2019 | "Brand New Day" | — | — | — | — | — | — | — | — | | Brand New Day |
| 2024 | "Stay with Me | — | — | — | — | — | — | — | — | | Non-album single |
| "—" denotes releases that did not chart | | | | | | | | | | | |
