= The Essential Eddie Money =

Greatest hits album by Eddie Money
- Released: June 10, 2003
- Recorded: 1977–1995
- Genre: Rock, pop rock
- Length: 58:51
- Label: Columbia Records/Legacy Records
- Producer: Jeff Magid

Eddie Money chronology
The Best of Eddie Money (2001)	The Essential Eddie Money (2003)	Then and Now (2003)

Professional ratings
Review scores
Source	Rating
AllMusic	4.5/5 stars

The Essential Eddie Money is a 2003 compilation album of hits from American rock singer Eddie Money, released as part of Sony BMG's Essential series. The album includes 15 tracks from Eddie Money's eight studio albums and one greatest hits album.

== US track listing ==
No.	Title	Writer(s)	Album	Length
1.	"Two Tickets to Paradise"	Eddie Money	Eddie Money (1977)	3:58
2.	"Baby Hold On"	Eddie Money, James Lyon	Eddie Money (1977)	3:32
3.	"Wanna Be A Rock 'N' Roll Star"	Eddie Money, Chris Solberg	Eddie Money (1977)	4:02
4.	"Gimme Some Water"	Eddie Money	Life for the Taking (1978)	3:39
5.	"Get a Move On"	Eddie Money, Paul Collins, Lloyd Chiate	Playing For Keeps (1980)	3:41
6.	"Trinidad"	Eddie Money, Lonnie Turner, Greg Douglass	Playing for Keeps (1980)	5:06
7.	"Shakin'"	Eddie Money, Ralph Carter, Elizabeth Myers, Johnny Gunn	No Control (1982)	3:09
8.	"Think I'm in Love"	Eddie Money, Randy Oda	No Control (1982)	3:24
9.	"No Control"	Eddie Money, Ralph Carter, Johnny Gunn	No Control (1982)	3:59
10.	"Take Me Home Tonight"	Mike Leeson, Peter Vale, Ellie Greenwich, Jeff Barry, Phil Spector	Can't Hold Back (1986)	3:31
11.	"I Wanna Go Back"	Monty Byrom, Danny Chauncey, Ira Walker	Can't Hold Back (1986)	3:55
12.	"Walk on Water"	Jesse Harms	Nothing to Lose (1988)	4:39
13.	"I'll Get By"	Eddie Money, Andy Hill, Antonina Armato	Right Here (1991)	3:33
14.	"Peace in Our Time"	Andy Hill, Peter Sinfield	Greatest Hits: The Sound of Money (1989)	5:02
15.	"There Will Never Be Another You"	Eddie Money, Curt Cuomo, Todd Cerney	Love and Money (1995)	3:55
Total length:				58:51

== Personnel ==
- Eddie Money – Lead vocals, piano, keyboards, saxophone, synthesizer, backing vocals
- Angelo Arcuri – Backing vocals
- Becky West – Backing vocals
- Jenny Meltzer – Backing vocals
- Joe Pizzulo – Backing vocals
- Lynn Carter – Backing vocals
- Marc Tanner – Backing vocals
- Maureen McCormick – Backing vocals
- Ron Nevison – Backing vocals
- Sandy Sukhov – Backing vocals
- Tracy Harris – Backing vocals
- Bob Glaub, Don Cromwell, Don Schiff, John Pierce, Kenny Lee Lewis, Lonnie Turner, Ralph Carter, Randy Jackson, Robert "Pops" Popwell – Bass
- Arthur Barrow – Bass, keyboards
- Claude Gaudette – Drum programming, keyboards
- Carmine Appice, Charley Drayton, Gary Ferguson, Gene Pardue, Glenn Symmonds, Jack White, John Snyder – Drums
- Guitar – David Lewark, David Lindley, Greg Douglas*, John Corey, Marty Walsh, Steve Farris (2), Stevie Salas
- Guitar, Backing Vocals – Chuck Kirkpatrick, Tom Girvin*
- Guitar, Keyboards, Backing Vocals – Richie Zito
- Guitar, Slide Guitar – John Nelson
- Horn – Tom Scott
- Keyboards – Brian Gary, Fred Webb*, Gary Chang, Jerry Deaton
- Keyboards, Backing Vocals – Jesse Harms
- Keyboards, Organ, Piano, Synthesizer, Vocals, Backing Vocals – Randy Nichols
- Keyboards, Percussion, Backing Vocals – Curt Cuomo
- Keyboards, Synthesizer – Kim Bullard
- Piano – Nicky Hopkins
- Saxophone – Boney James, Danny Hall, Paul Hanson
- Vocals [2nd Vocal] – Jo Baker (tracks: 2)
- Vocals [Duet] – Ronnie Spector (tracks: 10)
- Vocals, Backing Vocals – Tommy Funderburk

Production

- Jeff Magid – Compilation producer
- Producer [Original recordings produced by] – Bruce Botnick, Chris Lord-Alge, Curt Cuomo, Eddie Money, Monty Byrom, Randy D. Jackson*, Richie Zito, Ron Nevison, Tom Dowd

== Release history ==
Country	Date	Label	Format	Catalog
United States	2003	Columbia Records, Legacy Records	CD, digital download	CK 89213
Country	Date	Label	Format	Catalog
Australia	2014	Sony Music Entertainment	digital download	CK 890033048
