= The Best of Eddie Money =

Greatest hits album by Eddie Money
- Released: July 24, 2001
- Recorded: 1977–1989
- Genre: Rock, pop rock
- Length: 62:39
- Label: Columbia/Legacy
- Producer: Bruce Botnick; Tom Dowd; Chris Lord-Alge; Eddie Money; Ron Nevison; Richie Zito

Eddie Money chronology
Ready Eddie (1999)	The Best of Eddie Money (2001)	The Essential Eddie Money (2003)

Professional ratings
Review scores
Source	Rating
AllMusic	4/5 stars

The Best of Eddie Money is a compilation album by American rock singer Eddie Money, released in July 2001, and contains 16 digitally remastered tracks.

== Track listing ==
No.	Title	Writer(s)	Original album	Length
1.	"Two Tickets to Paradise"	Money	1977: Eddie Money	3:58
2.	"Shakin'"	Carter, Money, Myers	1982: No Control	3:09
3.	"Take Me Home Tonight"	Leeson, Vale, Greenwich, Barry, Spector	1986: Can't Hold Back	3:32
4.	"Wanna Be a Rock 'n' Roll Star"	Money, Solberg	1977: Eddie Money	4:01
5.	"Walk on Water"	Harms	1988: Nothing to Lose	4:40
6.	"Running Back"	Bryan	1980: Playing for Keeps	4:00
7.	"Think I'm in Love"	Money, Oda	1982: No Control	3:10
8.	"Maybe I'm a Fool"	Chiate, Garrett, Money, Taylor	1978: Life for the Taking	3:07
9.	"Rock and Roll the Place [Live]"	Lyon, Money	1979: Previously Unissued Promo Version	3:06
10.	"Baby Hold On"	Lyon, Money	1977: Eddie Money	3:32
11.	"We Should Be Sleeping"	Burns, Lowry, Money, Thompson	1986: Can't Hold Back	4:02
12.	"Trinidad"	Douglass, Money, Turner	1980: Playing for Keeps	5:08
13.	"I Wanna Go Back"	Byrom, Chuncey, Walker	1986: Can't Hold Back	3:55
14.	"No Control [Live]"	Carter, Guitierrez, Money	1983: Previously Unissued Promo Version	4:15
15.	"Where's the Party?"	Carter, Money	1983: Where's the Party	3:55
16.	"Peace in Our Time"	Hill, Sinfield	1989: Greatest Hits: The Sound of Money	5:02
