= Super Hits (Eddie Money album) =

Greatest hits album by Eddie Money
- Released: August 26, 1997
- Recorded: 1977–1988
- Genre: Rock, pop rock
- Length: 38:17
- Label: Columbia
- Producer: Bruce Botnick; Tom Dowd; Eddie Money; Ron Nevison; Richie Zito

Eddie Money chronology
| Good as Gold (1996) | Super Hits (1997) | Shakin' with the Money Man (1998) |

Professional ratings
Review scores
| Source | Rating |
|---|---|
| AllMusic | 3/5 stars |

Super Hits is a compilation album by Eddie Money, released in 1997, and contains ten digitally remastered tracks.

== Track listing ==
1. "Baby Hold On" (Lyon, Money) - 3:33
2. "Two Tickets to Paradise" (Money) - 3:59
3. "Think I'm in Love" (Money, Oda) - 3:10
4. "Running Back" (Bryan) - 4:01
5. "Take Me Home Tonight" (Leeson, Vale, Greenwich, Barry, Spector) - 3:32
6. "I Wanna Go Back" (Byron, Chuncey, Walker) - 3:58
7. "Walk on Water" (Harms) - 4:39
8. "We Should Be Sleeping" (Burns, Money, Lowry, Thompson) - 3:52
9. "The Big Crash" (Hitchings, Money) - 3:39
10. "Let's Be Lovers Again" (Lyon, Money) - 3:54

== Original albums releases ==
- Tracks 1, 2 — Eddie Money (1977)
- Track 4, 10 — Playing for Keeps (1980)
- Track 3 — No Control (1982)
- Track 9 — Where's the Party? (1983)
- Tracks 5, 6, 8 — Can't Hold Back (1986)
- Track 7 — Nothing to Lose (1988)
