= Greatest Hits: The Sound of Money =

Greatest Hits: Sound of Money

Greatest hits album by Eddie Money
- Released: November 14, 1989
- Genre: Rock, pop rock
- Length: 53:46
- Label: Columbia
- Producer: Various

Eddie Money chronology
| Nothing to Lose (1988) | Greatest Hits: Sound of Money (1989) | Right Here (1991) |

Professional ratings
Review scores
| Source | Rating |
|---|---|
| AllMusic | 4/5 stars |

Greatest Hits: Sound of Money is a compilation of American rock singer Eddie Money's biggest hits plus three new tracks: "Peace in Our Time", "Looking Through the Eyes of a Child" and "Stop Steppin' on My Heart". The disc was originally released in 1989 by Columbia Records. A remastered CD was released in 2009 by SPV.

== Track listing ==
| No. | Title | Writer(s) | Original album | Length |
|---|---|---|---|---|
| 1. | "Baby Hold On" | Money, Jimmy Lyon | 1977 - Eddie Money | 3:33 |
| 2. | "Two Tickets to Paradise" | Money | 1977 - Eddie Money | 3:59 |
| 3. | "Peace in Our Time" | Andy Hill, Peter Sinfield | 1989 - New Recording | 5:05 |
| 4. | "Where's the Party? (Live)" | Money, Ralph Carter | 1988 - Live Recording found here for the first time | 5:50 |
| 5. | "I Wanna Go Back" | Monty Byrom, Ira Walker, Danny Chauncey | 1986 - Can't Hold Back | 3:56 |
| 6. | "Walk on Water" | Jesse Harms | 1988 - Nothing to Lose | 4:40 |
| 7. | "Shakin'" | Money, Carter, Elizabeth Myers | 1982 - No Control | 3:08 |
| 8. | "Take Me Home Tonight" | Mick Leeson, Peter Vale, Ellie Greenwich, Jeff Barry, Phil Spector | 1986 - Can't Hold Back | 3:32 |
| 9. | "Think I'm in Love" | Money, Randy Oda | 1982 - No Control | 3:10 |
| 10. | "Looking Through the Eyes of a Child" | Hill, Sinfield, Albert Hammond | 1989 - New Recording | 4:32 |
| 11. | "No Control" | Money, Carter, J. Gunn | 1982 - No Control | 3:58 |
| 12. | "We Should Be Sleeping" | Money, Greg Lowry, Kevin Burns, Glen Thompson | 1986 - Can't Hold Back | 3:56 |
| 13. | "Stop Steppin' on My Heart" | Diane Warren | 1989 - New Recording | 4:22 |

== Singles ==
- "Peace in Our Time" (1990)
