= Good as Gold (Eddie Money album) =

1996 compilation album by Eddie Money

Greatest hits album by Eddie Money
- Released: 1996
- Recorded: 1977–1986
- Genres: Rock; pop rock
- Length: 39:24
- Labels: Columbia; Sony
- Producers: Bruce Botnick; Ron Nevison; Tom Dowd; Eddie Money; Richie Zito; David Kershenbaum

Eddie Money chronology
| Love and Money (1995) | Good as Gold (1996) | Super Hits (1997) |

Professional ratings
Review scores
| Source | Rating |
|---|---|
| AllMusic | 2/5 stars |

Good as Gold is an album by rock singer-songwriter Eddie Money, released in 1996. It is a budget compendium of top 40 hits and some album songs, all taken from Money's albums from Eddie Money through Can't Hold Back.

== Track listing ==
| No. | Title | Writer(s) | Original Album | Length |
|---|---|---|---|---|
| 1. | "Two Tickets to Paradise" | Eddie Money | 1977 – Eddie Money | 3:58 |
| 2. | "Where's the Party?" | Money, Ralph Carter | 1983 – Where's the Party | 3:52 |
| 3. | "Trinidad" | Money, Lonnie Turner, Greg Douglas | 1980 – Playing for Keeps | 5:03 |
| 4. | "Hard Life" | Money, Carter | 1983 – No Control | 3:50 |
| 5. | "Back on the Road" | Money, Carter, Davitt Sigerson | 1983 – Where's the Party | 3:01 |
| 6. | "Take Me Home Tonight"/"Be My Baby" | Jeff Barry, Ellie Greenwich, Michael Leeson, Peter Vale, Phil Spector | 1986 – Can't Hold Back | 3:31 |
| 7. | "Save a Little Room in Your Heart for Me" | Money | 1977 – Eddie Money | 4:56 |
| 8. | "Gimme Some Water" | Money | 1979 – Life for the Taking | 3:37 |
| 9. | "So Good to Be in Love Again" | Money, Jimmy Lyon | 1977 – Eddie Money | 4:12 |
| 10. | "Bad Girls" | Money, Duane Hitchings | 1983 – Where's the Party | 3:24 |
