= Shakin' with the Money Man =

Live album by Eddie Money
- Released: 28 October 1997
- Genres: Rock, pop rock
- Length: 59:13
- Label: USA: CMC International Canada: Silverline / Sanctuary (2003)
- Producers: Richie Zito, Curt Cuomo, Kim Bullard and Eddie Money

Eddie Money chronology
Super Hits (1997)	Shakin' with the Money Man (1997)	Greatest Hits Live: The Encore Collection (1998)

Professional ratings
Review scores
Source	Rating
AllMusic	2/5 stars

Shakin' with the Money Man is a 1997 live album by Eddie Money which includes four new studio tracks.

One of the new tracks, "If We Ever Get Out of This Place", was written by Paul Stanley, Curt Cuomo, Eddie Money and Tommy Girvin. This song is a re-written version of "If We Ever", which appeared on the Stan Bush albums Higher Than Angels and The Child Within.

== Track listing ==
1. Something to Believe In (Money/Cuomo/Hitchings)
2. If We Ever Get Out of This Place (Stanley/Cuomo/Girvin/Money)
3. Can You Fall in Love Again (Waite/Denicola)
4. Everybody Loves Christmas (Money/Cuomo)
5. Two Tickets to Paradise (Money)
6. I Wanna Go Back (Byrom/Walker/Chauncey)
7. She Takes My Breath Away (Money/Byrom/Morgan/Tanner/Bromham)
8. Where's the Party? (Money/Carter)
9. Gimme Some Water (Money)
10. Wanna Be a Rock-N-Roll Star (Money/Solberg)
11. Everybody Rock-n-Roll the Place (Money/Lyon)
12. Baby Hold On (Money/Lyon)
13. Take Me Home Tonight (Leeson/Vale/Greenwich/Barry/Spector)
14. Shakin' (Money/Carter/Meyers)

== Personnel ==
Musicians tracks 1–4:

- Eddie Money (lead vocals)
- Ronnie Spector (guest vocals on track 4)
- Curt Cuomo (backing vocals on track 1, 2, 4)
- Kim Bullard (keyboards on track 3)
- Richie Zito (guitars on track 1, 2, 4)
- Tommy Girvin (guitars/background vocals on track 1, 2 / backing vocals on track 4)
- Arther Burrows (bass and keyboards on track 1, 2, 4)
- Mark Harris (bass on track 3)
- Matt Laug (drums on track 1, 2)
- Kenny Aronoff (drums on track 3)
- Mike Beard (drums on track 4)
- Bill Mason (B-3 on track 1, 2)

Band line-up tracks 5–14:

- Eddie Money (lead vocals)
- Tommy Girvin (lead guitars)
- Bill Mason (keyboards)
- Trent Strow (bass)
- John Snider (drums)
- Bobby Levine (percussion)
- Dean Mitchell (rhythm guitar)

Notes

- Tracks 1, 2: Produced by Richie Zito, Curt Cuomo and Eddie Money.
- Track 3: Produced by Kim Bullard, Curt Cuomo and Eddie Money.
- Track 4: Produced by Richie Zito.
- Tracks 5–14: Recorded live at the Galaxy Theatre July 30 and 31, 1997, produced by Curt Cuomo and Eddie Money.
