= Greatest Hits Live: The Encore Collection =

Live album / Compilation album by Eddie Money
- Released: 1998
- Genre: Rock
- Label: Columbia

Eddie Money chronology
Shakin' with the Money Man (1997)	Greatest Hits Live: The Encore Collection (1998)	Ready Eddie (1999)

Greatest Hits Live: The Encore Collection is a live compilation album recorded in 1998 and released by Columbia Records. It was rated 1.5 stars by AllMusic.

== Track listing ==
1. Two Tickets To Paradise
2. Baby Hold On
3. I Wanna Go Back
4. Where's The Party
5. Take Me Home Tonight
6. Gimme Some Water
7. Wanna Be A Rock-N-Roll Star
8. Shakin'
9. If We Ever Get Out Of This Place
10. Can You Fall In Love Again Tonight
