= Billy Satellite =

American rock band

- Origin: Alameda, California, U.S.
- Genres: AOR, pop rock
- Labels: Capitol Records; Rock Candy Records; AOR Heaven
- Past members: Monty Byrom; Danny Chauncey; Ira Walker; Tom "Fee" Falletti

Billy Satellite was an American rock band based in Oakland, California. They are perhaps best known for composing and performing "I Wanna Go Back," which would later become a hit for Eddie Money. It was also covered by Gregg Rolie on his 1985 self-titled release.

== History ==
Formed in Alameda, California as a three-person band in the early 1980s, Billy Satellite originally consisted of Monty Byrom (vocals, guitar, keyboards), Ira Walker (bass), and Tom "Fee" Falletti (drums). After playing in clubs in the Bay Area for several months, Falletti invited his friend, Danny Chauncey (Mistress, All-Stars), to join the band on guitar and keyboards.

Billy Satellite rose to the top of the Bay Area music scene. They recorded a studio demo with Phil Kaffel. In 1982 or 1983, they were signed to Capitol Records by A&R man John S. Carter.

They recorded their first album at Rumbo Recorders in Los Angeles with Don Gehman producing. Their eponymous album was released in 1984 and included the singles "I Wanna Go Back" and "Satisfy Me." "Satisfy Me" was released first, and charted for six weeks, reaching the position of No. 64 on the Billboard Hot 100. Released four months later, "I Wanna Go Back" charted for three weeks, reaching the position of No. 78 on the Billboard Hot 100. Music videos were released for both of these songs. The video for "Satisfy Me" received airplay on MTV.

To support the album, Billy Satellite toured as an opening act for Night Ranger on the Midnight Madness Tour. They then toured with Jefferson Starship.

The band recorded a follow-up album at Good Night L.A. Studio with Keith Olsen producing. This time, the process was not as smooth. Olson wanted to bring in session keyboardist Bill Cuomo and session bassist Randy Jackson to play instead of Walker; only the former happened but it still tainted the six-week recording process.

Then, John S. Carter moved to A&M Records, leaving the band without its advocate inside Capitol Records. Carter was replaced by Jimmy Iovine who shelved the nameless album and dropped the band. Byrom recalls, “I didn't listen to the second album for about five years. But when I finally listened to it I kicked myself that it was never really finished. There are some really great songs on there! And we’d actually recorded around two other albums worth of material in our time. We were very prolific."

The lack of their album combined with excesses of the rock lifestyle, caused the band to break up shortly thereafter after just three years.

In 2009, Rock Candy Records remastered and re-released the band's original album as Billy Satellite 1. In April 2016, the band's unreleased follow-up album, II, was released on the AOR Heaven label 31 years after it was recorded.

== Post break-up ==
Byrom went on to form New Frontier which released an album in 1987 through an imprint of Polydor Records. He was also a songwriter for Eddie Money who covered Billy Satellite's "I Wanna Go Back" on his 1986 album Can't Hold Back. Money covered Billy Satellite's, "Satisfy Me" under the title "When You Gonna Satisfy Me" on his 1999 album, Ready Eddie. Later, Byrom formed Big House, a country-soul band that released two records. He also fronted The Buckaroos for thirteen years following Buck Owens' death. He has written songs that were recorded by Rita Coolidge, David Lee Roth, George Thorogood, and the Stray Cats.

In 1987, Chauncey joined 38 Special, staying with them through 2019. In 2019, he began playing live shows with Gregg Allman.

Falletti played with Gregg Allman, among others.

Walker has written songs and played with several acts, including Brian May & Tommy Castro, Steve Miller, Keb’ Mo, Eddie Money, Carlos Santana, and Joe Satriani. In 2002, he recorded with the Trichromes which includes Bill Kreutzmann (Grateful Dead), Neal Schon (Journey), and lyricist Robert Hunter. He also worked on recordings with Steve Earle, David Lee Murphy, Patti Lovelss, Gregg Rolie, Travis Tritt, Lenny Williams, and Lee Ann Wormack. He has produced fourteen albums, including one that received a Grammy Award nomination in 2008. He also performs as a solo artist with his own band and released the blues album Blame Me in 2013.

== Reunion ==
In 2010, Byrom, Walker, and Falletti were asked to perform in a benefit for guitarist Nick del Drago as Billy Satellite. With no rehearsal or soundcheck, the trio performed at Slim's in San Francisco on January 31, 2010, at what they believed was a one-time reunion. The audience for the benefit included their former manager Marty Cohn who suggested that they continue playing together. Cohn died a year later. Shortly afterward, they went to a studio and recorded a new album in twelve days.

In 2012, Byrom, Walker, and Falletti regrouped to form the band first called Zen Road Pilots and released their self-titled album. They performed in and around Bakersfield, California. Falletti said, "It's like Christmas for me because I'm getting a second chance at something in my life. When we were kids, we blew it. We knew it. We were too full of ourselves and just being silly. Now that we’re grown and everybody’s sober, it’s been a lot of fun." Expanding its members to five people, Monty Byrom and the Road Pilots released their album All These Roads in 2015.

== Discography ==
=== Albums ===
==== Billy Satellite (Capitol Records, 1984; Rock Candy Records, 2009) ====
Billy Satellite

Studio album by Billy Satellite
- Released: 1984
- Genre: AOR, pop rock
- Label: Capitol
- Producer: Don Gehman

Alternative Cover
- Cover of the 2000 ATM Records re-release

- Side 1:
1. "Satisfy Me" (Byrom, Chauncey, Walker) — 3:41
2. "Last Call" (Byrom, Byrom) — 3:29
3. "Do Ya?" (Walker) — 3:46
4. "I Wanna Go Back" (Byrom, Chauncey, Walker) — 3:52
5. "Trouble" (Byrom, Chauncey, Walker) — 3:46
- Side 2:
1. "Rockin' Down the Highway" (Byrom, Chauncey) — 3:30
2. "Turning Point" (Byrom, Walker) — 3:28
3. "Bye Bye Baby" (Byrom, Chauncey) — 4:30
4. "Standin' With the Kings" (Chauncey) — 3:51
5. "The Lonely One" (Byrom, Chauncey) — 3:29
- Bonus tracks (from the 2009 re-release)
1. "Poker Face" (Byrom, Walker) — 3:26
2. "Ready to Rock and Roll" (Newcomb, Allinsmith) — 4:03

==== II (AOR Heaven, 2016) ====
1. "You and Me and the Night" (Byrom, Chauncey) — 3:27
2. "Sorry" (Byrom, Chauncey, Walker) — 4:02
3. "Honesty" (Byrom, Chauncey, Walker) — 3:21
4. "You Got Nothing on Me" (Byrom, Chauncey) — 4:43
5. "Girls Like You" (Byrom, Chauncey) — 3:38
6. "Fantasy Girl" (Byrom, Chauncey) — 3:13
7. "Secrets in Her Heart" (Byrom, Walker) — 4:45
8. "Slipping Away" (Byrom, Chauncey) — 4:00
9. "Turning Pages" (Byrom) — 2:59
10. "Final Stand" (Byrom, Chauncey) — 4:30

=== Singles ===
1. "Satisfy Me" / "Turning Point"– (Capitol Records, debuted on August 18, 1984)
2. "I Wanna Go Back" / "Rockin' Down the Highway" – (Capitol Records, debuted on December 8, 1984)
