= I Wanna Go Back (disambiguation) =

"I Wanna Go Back" is a 1984 song by American rock band Billy Satellite.

I Wanna Go Back may also refer to:

- "I Wanna Go Back", a song by Steve Wariner from Laredo, 1990
- "I Wanna Go Back", a song by the Drums from The Drums, 2019
- Wanna Go Back, a 2007 album by Eddie Money

== See also ==
- I Wanna Go Backwards, 2007 album
- I Want to Go Back to Michigan, 1914 song
- I Want to Go Home (disambiguation)
