= Can't Keep a Good Man Down =

Can't Keep a Good Man Down may refer to:

- "Can't Keep a Good Man Down" (Eddie Money song), 1978
- "Can't Keep a Good Man Down" (Alabama song), 1985
- Can't Keep a Good Man Down, a 2001 album by rapper Lil Rob
- "Can't Keep A Good Man Down", a 1999 song by NewSong
