= Only Angel =

Only Angel may refer to:

- "Only Angel", a 1993 song by Cliff Richard from The Album
- "Only Angel", a 2017 song by Harry Styles from Harry Styles
