= Running back (disambiguation) =

Running back is a position in gridiron football.

Running back may also refer to:

- "Running Back" (Eddie Money song)
- "Running Back" (Jessica Mauboy song)
- "Running Back" (Wale song)
- "Runnin' Back", a song by Mýa from the album K.I.S.S. (Keep It Sexy & Simple)
- Running Back Records, a record label in Lorsch, Germany
