= Brand New Day (Eddie Money album) =

EP by Eddie Money
- Released: April 17, 2020
- Genre: Rock
- Length: 37:23
- Label: Money Music

Eddie Money chronology
Wanna Go Back (2007)	Brand New Day (2020)

Brand New Day is the fourth EP released by American musician Eddie Money. The EP was released posthumously following Money's death in September 2019. The album's title track, the final single released by Money, was released as the lead single on May 10, 2019. Brand New Day was intended to be Money's twelfth studio album, his first in twelve years, and was originally set to be released on July 19, 2019.

The album was subsequently postponed due to Money's illness that same month and his death on Friday, September 13, 2019 at the age of 70. Following the airing of a tribute concert to Money, it was revealed that a five song EP, not a full eleven song studio album, would be released on April 17, 2020. A second EP containing the remaining six songs will be released at a later date according to Money's wife, Laurie, who said "These will be his last recordings. The other half is a little more vintage. There's a big difference so they needed to be separated." As of November 2024, the remaining six songs have yet to be released.

== EP Track listing ==
1. "Brand New Day" – 3:56
2. "California Dream" – 3:22
3. "The Way That We Roll" – 3:36
4. "I Love New York" – 3:36
5. "Shame on Me" – 3:30

=== Unreleased songs ===
1. "Dancing in the Moonlight" – 3:22
2. "Ain't No Wishing Well" – 3:11
3. "Western Hero" – 4:26
4. "Shake That Thing" – 3:20
5. "Song for Jesse" – 2:53
6. "These Missing You Blues" – 2:35

=== Possible album track listing ===
1. "Brand New Day" – 3:56
2. "California Dream" – 3:22
3. "The Way That We Roll" – 3:36
4. "I Love New York" – 3:36
5. "Shame on Me" – 3:30
6. "Dancing in the Moonlight" – 3:22
7. "Ain't No Wishing Well" – 3:11
8. "Western Hero" – 4:26
9. "Shake That Thing" – 3:20
10. "Song for Jesse" – 2:53
11. "These Missing You Blues" – 2:35
