= 1988 Summer Olympics Album: One Moment in Time =

Compilation album by various artists
- Released: August 30, 1988 (North America, Brazil, Greece) (Europe, Asia)
- Genre: Pop; rock; R&B
- Length: 51:49
- Label: Arista
- Producer: Narada Michael Walden; John Williams; Bobby Sandstrom; Barry Gibb; Brian Tent; Maurice Gibb; Eric Carmen; Michael Lloyd; Jim Vallance; Ric Wake; Wayne Brathwaite; Martin Young; Kashif; Steve Young

Singles from 1988 Summer Olympics Album: One Moment in Time
- 1. "Olympic Spirit" Released: September 1988; 2. "One Moment in Time" Released: August 27, 1988; 3. "Reason to Try" Released: September 1988; 4. "Fight (No Matter How Long)" Released: 1988; 5. "Indestructible" Released: 1988

Professional ratings
Review scores
Source	Rating
AllMusic	2/5 stars

1988 Summer Olympics Album: One Moment in Time (titled as just One Moment in Time for some releases) is a compilation album that was released to coincide with the 1988 Summer Olympics in Seoul, South Korea. It was released on August 30, 1988, by Arista Records and features songs by some of the most popular artists at the time of the album's release, including the title track, "One Moment in Time" by Whitney Houston.

== Track listing ==
=== US edition ===
Original track listing order. Song list order differed on various album covers.

1. "Olympic Spirit" – John Williams (Williams)
2. "One Moment in Time" – Whitney Houston (Albert Hammond, John Bettis)
3. "Fight (No Matter How Long)" – The Bunburys (Barry Gibb, Robin Gibb, Maurice Gibb, David English)
4. "Indestructible" – Four Tops (Bobby Sandstrom, Michael Price)
5. "Reason to Try" – Eric Carmen (Jon Lind, Phil Galdston)
6. "Shape of Things to Come" – Bee Gees (B. Gibb, R. Gibb, M. Gibb)
7. "Peace in Our Time" – Jennifer Holliday (Andy Hill, Peter Sinfield)
8. "Willpower" – Taylor Dayne (Graham Lyle, Terry Britten)
9. "That's What Dreams Are Made of" – Odds & Ends (Dave Plenn)
10. "Harvest for the World" – The Christians (The Isley Brothers)
11. "Rise to the Occasion" – Jermaine Jackson & La La (not on LP) (Simon Climie, Rob Fisher, Dennis Morgan)
12. "Olympic Joy" – Kashif (Kashif)

=== European edition ===
1. "Olympic Spirit" – John Williams
2. "One Moment in Time" – Whitney Houston
3. "Fight (No Matter How Long)" – The Bunburys
4. "Harvest for the World" – The Christians
5. "Reason to Try" – Eric Carmen
6. "Shape of Things to Come" – Bee Gees
7. "Peace in Our Time" – Jennifer Holliday
8. "Willpower" – Taylor Dayne
9. "That's What Dreams Are Made of" – Odds & Ends
10. "Rise to the Occasion" – Jermaine Jackson & La La (not on LP)
11. "Olympic Joy" – Kashif

=== Brazil, Greece editions ===
The track listing varies depending on country of release.

1. "Olympic Spirit" – John Williams
2. "One Moment in Time" – Whitney Houston
3. "Fight (No Matter How Long)" – The Bunburys
4. "Indestructible" – Four Tops
5. "Reason to Try" – Eric Carmen
6. "Shape of Things to Come" – Bee Gees
7. "Peace in Our Time" – Jennifer Holliday
8. "Willpower" – Taylor Dayne
9. "That's What Dreams Are Made of" – Odds & Ends
10. "Harvest for the World" – The Christians
11. "Olympic Joy" – Kashif

== Personnel ==
- Dick Bouchard, Jeff Lancaster – design
- Clive Davis – executive producer
- John Forsman – photography
- Gary Borman – executive music supervisor

== Certifications ==
Region	Certification	Certified units/sales
United States (RIAA)	Gold	500,000^{^}
^{^} Shipments figures based on certification alone.
