= I Still Believe in You (Cliff Richard song) =

1992 single by Cliff Richard

Single by Cliff Richard

from the album The Album
- B-side: "Bulange Downpour"
- Released: 23 November 1992
- Length: 3:44
- Label: EMI
- Songwriters: David Pomeranz; Dean Pitchford
- Producer: Paul Moessl

Cliff Richard singles chronology
"This New Year" (1991)	"I Still Believe in You" (1992)	"Peace in Our Time" (1993)

Music video
- "I Still Believe in You" on YouTube

"I Still Believe in You" is a song recorded by British singer Cliff Richard. It was released in November 1992 by EMI Records as the first single from his 31st album, The Album (1993). It is written by David Pomeranz and Dean Pitchford, and produced by Paul Moessl. The song peaked at number seven on the UK Singles Chart.

== Music video ==
Richard performs the song against a backdrop of gauzes and screens with images overlays of a woman and young girl as the subject of the song. The video was recorded on 3 November 1992, produced by Jayne Griffiths and directed by Paul Cox.

== 2014 support campaign ==
Richard's fans mounted a social media support campaign for him in 2014 after allegations that fans fervently believed were false were made against him. The support campaign encouraged his fans to download the track to get it into the UK Singles chart. The campaign was successful in getting the song to number 57 in the weekly singles chart.

== Track listing ==
- 7-inch vinyl and cassette single
1. "I Still Believe in You"
2. "Bulange Downpour"
- CD single – Part 1
1. "I Still Believe in You"
2. "Bulange Downpour"
3. "There's No Power in Pity"
- CD single – Part 2
1. "I Still Believe in You"
2. "Remember" ("When Two Worlds Drift Apart") (French adaption)
3. "Ocean Deep"

== Charts ==
Chart (1992)	Peak position
Australia (ARIA)	176
Ireland (IRMA)	18
UK Singles (OCC)	7
UK Airplay (Music Week)	23

Chart (2014)	Peak position
UK Singles (OCC)	57
