= Can't Keep a Good Man Down (Eddie Money song) =

Single by Eddie Money

from the album Life for the Taking
- B-side: "Nightmare"
- Released: 1979
- Genre: Rock
- Label: Columbia
- Songwriter(s): Dan Alexander, Eddie Money, Chris Solberg
- Producer(s): Bruce Botnick

Eddie Money singles chronology
| "Maybe I'm a Fool" (1979) | "Can't Keep a Good Man Down" (1979) | "Get a Move On" (1979) |

"Can't Keep a Good Man Down" is a song by American rock singer Eddie Money, from his album Life for the Taking in 1978. It was released as a single and reached #63 on the Billboard Hot 100.
