= Endless Nights (song) =

Single by Eddie Money

from the album Can't Hold Back
- B-side: "Bring on the Rain"
- Released: 1987
- Genre: Rock
- Length: 3:23
- Label: Columbia
- Songwriter(s): John Cesario; Michele Collyer; Steve Mullen
- Producer(s): Richie Zito; Eddie Money

Eddie Money singles chronology
"I Wanna Go Back" (1986)	"Endless Nights" (1987)	"We Should Be Sleeping" (1987)

"Endless Nights" is a song by American rock singer Eddie Money, released in 1987 as the third single from his sixth studio album, Can't Hold Back (1986). It was written by John Cesario, Michele Collyer and Steve Mullen, and was produced by Richie Zito and Money. It reached number 21 on the Billboard Hot 100 and number 10 on the Album Rock Tracks chart.

A music video was filmed to promote the single, directed by David Fincher. It achieved heavy rotation on MTV.

== Critical reception ==
Upon its release, Billboard called "Endless Nights" a "rock ballad presented in direct, no-frills style" and added that its "live-sounding spontaneity wins out over production polish". Cash Box considered it to be a "gritty, emotionally rendered mid-tempo rock ballad". The reviewer noted Money's "wide, expressive voice" and the "memorable melody and tight production" which "bode[s] well for a solid run on the chart".

== Track listing ==
7" single

1. "Endless Nights" – 3:23
2. "Bring On the Rain – 4:54

7" single (US promo)

1. "Endless Nights" – 3:23
2. "Endless Nights" – 3:23

== Charts ==
Chart (1987)	Peak position
US Billboard Hot 100	21
US Billboard Album Rock Tracks	10
