= Forget About Love =

Song by Eddie Money

from the album Nothing to Lose
- Released: 1989
- Length: 4:42
- Label: Columbia
- Songwriter(s): Eddie Money; Richie Zito; Tom Whitlock; Todd Cerney
- Producer(s): Richie Zito; Eddie Money

"Forget About Love" is a song by American singer-songwriter Eddie Money, which was released in 1989 as a track on his seventh studio album Nothing to Lose. It was written by Money, Richie Zito, Tom Whitlock and Todd Cerney, and produced by Zito and Money. The song reached No. 36 on the Billboard Album Rock Tracks chart.

== Background ==
"Forget About Love" was inspired by Money's separation from his first wife, Margo Lee Walker, and having a daughter with his new fiancée, Laurie Harris, in 1988. He told the Pittsburgh Post-Gazette in 1988, "I still love my wife, but I wanted a baby. Now I have one, and she's beautiful – it's just unfortunate my wife didn't have her. 'Forget About Love' [is] about that, how it came down. I'm happy with the baby, but I miss my wife." He added in an interview with the Scripps Howard News Service in 1989, "I wrote 'Forget About Love' as if she was singing it to me."

== Critical reception ==
In a review of Nothing to Lose, Steve Persall of the Tampa Bay Times noted, "Money's best outlook on love is when he plays the tough romantic on [songs such as] 'Forget About Love'." He felt the song had a "solid hook" and "entertaining arrangement". Kevin Connal of The Boston Globe described it as "an incessant rock song with a melodic surge of keyboards chiming out".

== Personnel ==
Production

- Richie Zito, Eddie Money – producers, arrangers
- Phil Kaffel – engineer, mixing
- Julian Stoll – assistant engineer
- Stan Katayama, Jim Dineen, Toby Wright, Tom Johnson – assistant mixers

== Charts ==
| Chart (1989) | Peak position |
|---|---|
| US Billboard Album Rock Tracks | 36 |
