= Let Me In (Eddie Money song) =

Single by Eddie Money

from the album Nothing to Lose
- B-side: "Forget About Love"
- Released: 1989
- Genre: Rock
- Length: 4:20
- Label: Columbia
- Songwriters: Dennis Matkosky, Paul Gordon
- Producers: Eddie Money, Richie Zito

Eddie Money singles chronology
"The Love in Your Eyes" (1989)	"Let Me In" (1989)	"Peace in Our Time" (1990)

"Let Me In" is a song recorded by American rock singer Eddie Money and featured on his 1988 album, Nothing to Lose. It was released as the third single from the album in 1989 and reached number 60 on the US Billboard Hot 100 and number 30 on Billboard′s Album Rock Tracks chart.

== Laura Branigan version ==
Laura Branigan selected the song in 1989 as one of several she would record for her next album. Working with the song's co-writer, Dennis Matkosky, Branigan co-produced the track, which appears on her 1990 album, Laura Branigan.
