= The Big Crash =

Single by Eddie Money

from the album Where's the Party?
- B-side: "Backtrack"
- Released: 1983
- Genre: Rock
- Label: Columbia
- Songwriter(s): Eddie Money, Duane Hitchings

Eddie Money singles chronology
"Shakin'" (1982)	"The Big Crash" (1983)	"Club Michelle" (1984)

"The Big Crash" is a song by American rock singer Eddie Money, from his album Where's the Party? in 1983. Released as a single, it reached No. 54 on the Billboard Hot 100 and No. 17 on the Mainstream Rock chart.

== Charts ==
Chart (1983–1984)	Peak position
US Billboard Hot 100	54
US Mainstream Rock (Billboard)	17
