= Let's Be Lovers Again =

Single by Eddie Money

from the album Playing for Keeps
- B-side: "Million Dollar Girl"
- Released: 1980
- Genre: Rock
- Length: 3:54 (Album and commercial 7" version); 3:43 (Promo 7" version)
- Label: Columbia
- Songwriters: Money; Lyon

Eddie Money singles chronology
"Get a Move On" (1979)	"Let's Be Lovers Again" (1980)	"Running Back" (1980)

Professional ratings
Review scores
Source	Rating
Billboard	(unrated)

"Let's Be Lovers Again" is a duet performed by American rock singer Eddie Money and singer-songwriter Valerie Carter. The song appeared on Money's album Playing for Keeps in 1980. It was released as a single and reached No. 65 on the Billboard Hot 100.
