= Wanna Go Back =

Studio album by Eddie Money
- Released: March 13, 2007
- Studios: Studio D Recording (Sausalito, California)
- Genres: Rock, pop rock
- Length: 43:45
- Label: Warrior
- Producers: Eddie Money; Randy Forrester; Joel Jaffe

Eddie Money chronology
Let's Rock and Roll the Place (2003)	Wanna Go Back (2007)	Brand New Day (2020)

Professional ratings
Review scores
Source	Rating
Allmusic	3.5/5 stars

Wanna Go Back is the eleventh and final studio album by American singer Eddie Money, released on March 13, 2007. On it, Money sings cover versions of popular songs from the 1960s. His daughter, Jesse Money, performed on three tracks from the album. The title comes from Money's 1986 hit "I Wanna Go Back".

It was his last album to be released before his death on September 13, 2019 as well as Money's only 21st-century studio album.

== Track listing ==
1. "Ain't No Mountain High Enough" (featuring Jesse Money) (Nikolas Ashford, Valerie Simpson) – 2:41
2. "Higher and Higher" (Gary Jackson, Carl Smith, Raynard Miner) – 3:24
3. "You Don't Know Me" (Eddy Arnold, Cindy Walker, Andy Walker) – 4:42
4. "Baby, Now That I've Found You" (John MacLeod, Tony Macaulay) – 3:02
5. "Good Lovin'" (Rudy Clark, Artie Resnick) – 2:36
6. "Expressway to Your Heart" (Kenny Gamble, Leon Huff) – 3:34
7. "Jenny Take a Ride" (Enotris Johnson, Richard Penniman) – 4:04
8. "Build Me Up Buttercup" (Michael d'Abo, Macaulay) – 3:35
9. "Land of a Thousand Dances" (Chris Kenner) – 3:30
10. "Hold On, I'm Comin'" (featuring Jesse Money) (Isaac Hayes, David Porter) – 2:27
11. "Mockingbird" (featuring Jesse Money) (Charlie Foxx, Inez Foxx) – 4:24
12. "Please Please/Baby Don't You Weep" (Johnny Terry, James Brown) – 5:46

== Personnel ==
- Eddie Money – lead vocals, harmonica
- Randy Forrester – keyboards, backing vocals
- Jeff Tamelier – lead guitar, rhythm guitars
- Tommy Girvin – additional guitars
- Joel Jaffe – additional guitars, pedal steel guitar
- Tommy Miller – bass guitar, backing vocals
- Donny Baldwin – drums, backing vocals
- Rob Zuckerman – clarinet, saxophones
- Joel Behrman – trombone
- Tom Poole – trumpet, flugelhorn
- Johnny Gunn – additional backing vocals
- Jessica Money – backing vocals, lead vocals (1, 11)

=== Production ===
- Jim Ervin – executive producer
- Rande Volpert – executive producer
- Randy Forrester – producer
- Eddie Money – producer
- Joel Jaffe – co-producer, engineer, mastering
- Marc Dimmitt – second engineer
- Jeremy Phillips – assistant engineer
- Rick Myers – cover artwork, graphics, photography
- Tony Neste – photography
