= I Want to Go Home =

I Want to Go Home may refer to:

- I Want to Go Home! is a 1981 children's novel by Gordon Korman.
- I Want to Go Home (1989 film), a 1989 French film
- I Want to Go Home (2017 film), a 2017 documentary film
- "I Want to Go Home", a 2023 song by Oliver Anthony Music

== See also ==
- I Wanna Go Back (disambiguation)
- "I Wanna Go Home", alternative name for "Detroit City"
