= Club Michelle =

Song by Eddie Money

Single by Eddie Money

from the album Where's the Party?
- B-side: "Back on the Road"
- Released: 1984
- Genre: Rock
- Label: Columbia
- Songwriters: Eddie Money, Ralph Carter, Mitchell Froom, Raymond Charles Burton

Eddie Money singles chronology
"The Big Crash" (1983)	"Club Michelle" (1984)	"Take Me Home Tonight" (1986)

"Club Michelle" is a song by American rock singer Eddie Money, from his 1983 album Where's the Party?. It was released as a single by Columbia Records in 1984. The song was written by Money, Ralph Carter, Mitchell Froom and Raymond Charles Burton, and produced by Money and Tom Dowd.

== Reception ==
In a contemporary review of Where's the Party?, Vincent J. Winkel of The Christian Science Monitor identified "Club Michelle" as one of the album's noteworthy tracks and described its narrative as the unsuccessful search for a nightclub where the protagonist had previously fallen in love.

Billboard included "Club Michelle" among its recommended singles, noting the song's disco- and synthesizer-influenced beat.

== Chart performance ==
"Club Michelle" reached number 66 on the Billboard Hot 100 for the week ending March 24, 1984.
