= Get a Move On =

Single by Eddie Money

from the album Playing for Keeps
- B-side: "Don't You Ever Say No"
- Released: 1979
- Genre: Rock
- Label: Columbia
- Songwriters: Money; Paul Collins; Lloyd Chiate

Eddie Money singles chronology
"Can't Keep a Good Man Down" (1979)	"Get a Move On" (1979)	"Let's Be Lovers Again" (1980)

"Get a Move On" is a song by American rock singer Eddie Money from his album Playing for Keeps in 1980. It was released as a single and reached #46 on the Billboard Hot 100.

== Chart performance ==
The song peaked at No. 46 on the Billboard Hot 100 in the US, and No. 59 on the RPM 100 single chart in Canada.

== In popular culture ==
The song was released for the soundtrack film Americathon (1979), and was later used in an episode of CSI: New York in 2011 and the film Godzilla (1998) and In A World... (2013).

Maureen McCormick on background vocals, best known as Marcia Brady on The Brady Bunch.
