= Maybe I'm a Fool =

- Side A of the US single

Single by Eddie Money

from the album Life for the Taking
- B-side: "Life for the Taking"
- Released: January 1979
- Genre: Rock, disco, soul, R&B
- Label: Columbia
- Songwriter(s): Lloyd Chiate, L. Garrett, Eddie Money, R. Taylor
- Producer(s): Bruce Botnick

Eddie Money singles chronology
"You've Really Got a Hold on Me" (1979)	"Maybe I'm a Fool" (1979)	"Can't Keep a Good Man Down" (1979)

"Maybe I'm a Fool" is a song by American rock singer, Eddie Money, from his album Life for the Taking in 1978. It was the first of two single releases from the LP, and was the bigger hit.

The song reached #22 on the U.S. Billboard Hot 100 and #28 in Canada in early 1979. It was also a modest hit in Australia (#51).
