= Ready Eddie =

Studio album by Eddie Money
- Released: May 18, 1999
- Studio: Cherokee Studios (Hollywood, California); Rumbo Recorders (Canoga Park, California); Hookmo Recording (Los Angeles, California); Can-Am Recorders (Tarzana, California); Chicago Trax Recording Studio (Chicago, Illinois); Right Track Recording (New York City, New York)
- Genre: Rock, pop rock
- Length: 46:27
- Label: CMC International
- Producer: Curt Cuomo; Frankie Sullivan; Eddie Money

Eddie Money chronology
Greatest Hits Live: The Encore Collection (1998)	Ready Eddie (1999)	Complete Eddie Money Live (2000)

Ready Eddie is Eddie Money's tenth studio album, released in 1999. It was his final album of original material to be released before his death in 2019.

== Background ==
Ready Eddie was Money's first and only studio album for the American independent record label CMC International. During its recording, the album's budget was exceeded by $56,000, which came from Money's own pocket after CMC refused to pay it. In a 1999 interview with the San Francisco Examiner, Money said about Ready Eddie, "I think it's a really good record. I just wanted to get back into the world of rock. The last studio album I made was Love and Money, which was mostly a romantic album." He told the Tucson Citizen that CMC "wanted a hard-rock, bang-your-head-to-the-wall album" and picked "So Cold Tonight", "Broken Down Chevy", "Can't Go On" and "Turn the Light Off" as his favorite tracks. However, Money was not happy with the entire album and felt he made a concession by including two tracks, "Ready to Rock" and "It's Gotta Be Love", which CMC wanted on there. He considered "Ready to Rock" to be "so mundane and so '80s" and was even more resentful of "It's Gotta Be Love", telling the Tucson Citizen, "I hate the song, with those stupid, sissy choruses. I wrote the verse and the B-section and I said to CMC, 'Look, the song's not ready. Why don't you just let me save the song for the next record and I'll write a great chorus.' But no."

== Release ==
Ready Eddie was released in the US by CMC International on May 18, 1999. "Don't Say No Tonight" was issued as a single from the album. It achieved radio play in the US and reached a peak of number 40 on the Radio & Records Rock Top 50 airplay chart in June 1999.

== Critical reception ==
Professional ratings
Review scores
Source	Rating
AllMusic	link
Calgary Herald	3/5 stars
Nanaimo Daily News	2.5/4 stars
The Press of Atlantic City	3/4 stars
The Windsor Star	1/5 stars
The Winnipeg Sun	2.5/4 stars

Critical reviews were mixed to positive, generally describing the album as formulaic but well-made.

Upon its release, Walter Pierce of The Daily Advertiser commented, "If you're a fan, you'll get what you deserve: a solid set of pop rockers and rocking ballads that are très Eddie. It's good to see one of the last few demigods from the album-rock firmament still chugging away." Charles Schroeder of The Press of Atlantic City concluded, "Money doesn't always make the most consequential music, but every few years he shows us again he has an ear for likable, listenable rock 'n' roll. He does it again, and rather well, on Ready Eddie." Steve Jenkinson of the Nanaimo Daily News called it a "heavy offering of riff-laden meat and potatoes rock that deviates little from a well-travelled path sprinkled with hits" and added, "Money is nothing, if not consistent. His past hits have a comfortable familiarity that is continued here." Darryl Sterdan of The Winnipeg Sun stated it "pretty much sounds like any of his old records", with Money's "sandpaper rasp as scruffy as ever, and his roster of '70s-style air guitar rockers and Bic-lighter ballads as slick as ever".

John Wooley of Tulsa World believed Money sounded "just as unremarkable but alarmingly catchy as he's ever been". He felt the songs were "so predictable you'll be able to sing along with them on first listen" and the lyrics a "veritable smörgåsbord of rock's most tired clichés", but concluded, "Still, for those still titillated by the fast cars and busty babes pictured on the cover, there are plenty of tickets to paradise here." James Muretich of the Calgary Herald noted Money's music was the "same as it ever was" and summarised, "As an unintentional comic pastiche of a past rock era, this is the Spinal Tap of retro rock." Ted Shaw of The Windsor Star was negative in his review, calling it an "undistinguished collection of rock tunes" and a "stuck-in-the-'70s release with songs about fast cars and love on the run". He continued, "This arena-sized rock was largely a waste of time 20 years ago; it doesn't sound much better now. Money keeps going back to the same well long after it went bone-dry." John Terlesky III of The Morning Call noted, "Party-metal rockers vie with Bic lighter ballads for the title of 'Most Accurate Throwback to the '80s,' but nobody really wins here, especially the listener who welcomed the demise of that aesthetically displeasing decade."

== Track listing ==
1. "Ready to Rock" (Curt Cuomo, Jake Hooker, Eddie Money, Frankie Sullivan) - 4:21
2. "Don't Say No Tonight" (Cuomo, Money, Sullivan) - 5:05
3. "So Cold Tonight" (Cuomo, Money, Sullivan) - 4:24
4. "Let It Go" (Dedicated to "Jack and Diane") (Cuomo, Money, Sullivan, Larry Lee) - 4:06
5. "Turn the Light Off" (Cuomo, Money, Sullivan) - 3:18
6. "It's Gotta Be Love" (Cuomo, Money, Sullivan) - 4:30
7. "Can't Go On" (Cuomo, Money, Sullivan) - 5:11
8. "Nobody Knows" (John Nelson, Money) - 3:26
9. "When You Gonna Satisfy Me" (Monty Byrom, Money, Danny Chauncey, Ira Walker) - 4:19
10. "Need a Little Rock" (Eddie Rice) - 3:26
11. "Broken Down Chevy (God Only Knows)" (John Nelson, Money) - 4:21

== Production ==
- Jake Hooker – executive producer
- Ray Koob – A&R
- Eddie Money – producer, additional photography
- Curt Cuomo – producer, engineer
- Frankie Sullivan – producer, engineer, mixing (4, 11)
- Shawn Berman – engineer
- Jim Mitchell – engineer
- Posie Muliadi – engineer
- Dee Robb – engineer
- Chris Steinmentz – engineer, mixing (4, 11)
- Frank Filipetti – mixing (1–3, 5–10)
- Steve Muzar – mix assistant (1–3, 5–10)
- Fred Hahna – Pro Tools editing
- Ted Jensen – mastering at Sterling Sound (New York, NY)
- Alan Chappell – art direction, design
- Ioannis – art direction, design, cover painting, digital retouching
- Mark Weiss – photos of Eddie Money

== Personnel ==
Musicians

- Eddie Money – vocals, harmonica (1, 3, 11)
- Arlin Schierbaum – Hammond B3 organ (1, 3, 6)
- Curt Cuomo – keyboards (2, 7)
- Chris Cameron – acoustic piano (4)
- C.J. Vanston – strings (5), orchestration (5)
- Randy Forrester – Hammond B3 organ (11)
- Frankie Sullivan – guitars (1–8, 11), bass (5)
- Fred Tackett – guitars (4)
- Tommy Girvin – guitars (6, 11)
- Monty Byrom – guitars (9, 10)
- Trent Stroh – bass (1–4, 6–11)
- Kenny Aronoff – drums, percussion
- Johnny Schneider – additional percussion (8)

Backing vocals

- Curt Cuomo (1, 7, 8, 10)
- Larry Lee (1, 4, 6)
- Frankie Sullivan (1–3, 6–8)
- Eddie Money (4, 10)
- Monty Byrom (9, 10)
