= The Love in Your Eyes (Eddie Money song) =

"Love in Your Eyes"

Single by Eddie Money

from the album Nothing to Lose
- B-side: "Bad Boy"
- Released: 1989
- Genre: Rock
- Length: 4:05
- Label: Columbia
- Songwriters: Adrian Gurvitz, David Paul Bryant, Steve Dubin
- Producers: Richie Zito; Eddie Money

Eddie Money singles chronology
"Walk on Water" (1988)	"Love in Your Eyes" (1989)	"Let Me In" (1989)

"The Love in Your Eyes" is a song by American rock singer Eddie Money, released in 1989 as the second single from his seventh studio album, Nothing to Lose (1988). It reached number 24 on the Billboard Hot 100, number 15 on the Cash Box Top 100 and number one on the Billboard Album Rock Tracks chart. The song was written by Adrian Gurvitz, David Paul Bryant, and Steve Dubin.

== See also ==
- List of Billboard Mainstream Rock number-one songs of the 1980s
