= The Album (Cliff Richard album) =

Studio album by Cliff Richard
- Released: April 19, 1993
- Recorded: May – October 1992
- Studio: RG Jones, London, UK; Westside, London; Nomis, London
- Genre: Pop; easy listening
- Length: 62:45
- Label: EMI
- Producer: Cliff Richard; Paul Moessl; Bruce Welch; Nik Kershaw

Cliff Richard chronology
Together with Cliff Richard (1991)	The Album (1993)	The Hit List (1994)

Singles from The Album
- 1. "I Still Believe in You" Released: 23 November 1992; 2. "Peace in Our Time" Released: 15 March 1993; 3. "Human Work of Art" Released: 1 June 1993; 4. "Never Let Go" Released: 20 September 1993; 5. "Healing Love" Released: 6 December 1993

Professional ratings
Review scores
Source	Rating
AllMusic	2.5/5 stars
Music Week	4/5 stars

The Album is the 31st studio album by English singer Cliff Richard. Released in 1993, it peaked at number one on the UK Albums Chart, becoming Richard's first non-compilation or non-film soundtrack album to reach the top spot since 21 Today in 1961.

It features five UK top 40 hit singles: "I Still Believe in You" (UK No. 7), "Peace in Our Time" (UK No. 8), "Human Work of Art" (UK No. 24), "Never Let Go" (UK No. 32) and "Healing Love" (UK No. 19).

== Track listing ==
1. "Peace in Our Time" (Peter Sinfield, Andy Hill) – 5:46
2. "Love Is the Strongest Emotion" (Mick Leeson, Peter Vale) – 4:12
3. "I Still Believe in You" (David Pomeranz, Dean Pitchford) – 3:43
4. "Love's Salvation" (Cliff Richard, Paul Moessl) – 4:12
5. "Only Angel" (Barry Williams) – 5:30
6. "Handle My Heart with Love" (John Daniels, Phil Thomson) – 4:24
7. "Little Mistreater" (John Wilson, Alan Gorrie, Steve Pigott) – 3:55
8. "You Move Heaven" (Moessl, Steve Glen) – 4:18
9. "I Need Love" (Wilson) – 3:44
10. "Hold Us Together" (Richard, Moessl) – 4:45
11. "Human Work of Art" (Leeson, Vale) – 4:38
12. "Never Let Go" (Wilson, Gorrie) – 4:08
13. "Healing Love" (Nik Kershaw, Dennis Morgan) – 5:01
14. "Brother to Brother" (Moessl, Glen) – 4:24

== Charts ==
=== Weekly charts ===
Weekly chart performance for The Album
Chart (1993)	Peak position
Australian Albums (ARIA)	72
Danish Albums (Hitlisten)	20
New Zealand Albums (RMNZ)	11
UK Albums (OCC)	1

=== Year-end charts ===
1993 year-end chart performance for The Album
Chart (1993)	Position
UK Albums (OCC)	50

== Certifications ==
Region	Certification	Certified units/sales
United Kingdom (BPI)	Gold	100,000^{^}
^{^} Shipments figures based on certification alone.
