= We Should Be Sleeping =

Single by Eddie Money

from the album Can't Hold Back
- B-side: "Same"
- Released: 1987
- Genre: Rock
- Label: Columbia
- Songwriter(s): Eddie Money; Kevin Burns; Greg Lowry; Glen Thompson
- Producer(s): Richie Zito; Eddie Money

Eddie Money singles chronology
"Endless Nights" (1987)	"We Should Be Sleeping" (1987)	"Walk on Water" (1988)

"We Should Be Sleeping" is a song by American rock singer Eddie Money, released in 1987 as the fourth single from his sixth studio album, Can't Hold Back (1986). It reached number 90 on the Billboard Hot 100.

== Critical reception ==
Upon its release, Billboard described "We Should Be Sleeping" as "power pop" which "rocks to a foot-stomping beat with raw and gritty energy". Cash Box noted that the combination of a "great hook", "memorable lyrics" and a "driving rock melody" made the song a "shoe-in for instant radio acceptance" and added, "Healthy AOR play earlier this year combined wiwth Money's recent top 40 chart successes should propel this one immediately."
