= Jimmy Lyon (guitarist) =

- Born: James Douglas Lyon; May 22, 1955 (age 71)
- Genre: Rock
- Instrument: Guitar
- Formerly of: Eddie Money, Greg Kihn Band
- Website: https://www.jimmylyon.com/

James Douglas Lyon (born May 22, 1955) is an American rock guitarist and composer. He is known primarily as the guitarist for Eddie Money in the late 1970s and early 1980s, and as a member of The Greg Kihn Band in the early 1990s.

== Career ==
Jimmy Lyon was a guitar prodigy in California's Central Valley. He was discovered by Bill Graham, and paired with vocalist Eddie Money (another Graham discovery). Lyon was the lone guitarist on Eddie Money's first two albums, Eddie Money and Life for the Taking. He was the lead guitarist on the albums Playing for Keeps and No Control. Lyon left after the No Control album, but did play on the song "Backtrack" from the Where's the Party? album, and later made a guest appearance on the Nothing to Lose album, playing lead guitar on the hit "Walk on Water".

He was the lead guitarist for the Tina Turner Private Dancer tour in 1985.

Lyon played guitar on the Greg Kihn Band albums, Unkihntrollable and Kihn Of Hearts.

== Personal life ==
He is married to Elaine Lyon; they have two daughters, Monica and Jessica.

He attended Marina High School (San Leandro, California), from 1969-1973.

Lyon is a certified pilot and a certified flight instructor, having worked in the aviation industry during breaks in his music career.
