= Peace in Our Time (Jennifer Holliday song) =

1989 single by Eddie Money

"Peace in Our Time" is a song written by English songwriters Andy Hill and Peter Sinfield, first recorded by American singer and actress Jennifer Holliday for the 1988 Summer Olympics album One Moment in Time. The song was later covered by American rock singer Eddie Money and English singer Cliff Richard.

== Eddie Money version ==
"Peace in Our Time"

Single by Eddie Money

from the album Greatest Hits: The Sound of Money
- B-side: "Where's the Party?" (live)
- Released: 1989
- Length: 5:05
- Label: Columbia
- Songwriters: Andy Hill, Peter Sinfield
- Producers: Chris Lord-Alge, Eddie Money

Eddie Money singles chronology
"Let Me In" (1989)	"Peace in Our Time" (1989)	"Heaven in the Back Seat" (1991)

Eddie Money released his version as a single in 1989 and included it on his album Greatest Hits: The Sound of Money (1989). The single debuted on the US Billboard Hot 100 chart on 2 December 1989, and reached a peak of number 11. It also reached number two on the Billboard Album Rock Tracks chart and number 34 on the Billboard Adult Contemporary chart. In Canada, "Peace in Our Time" reached number three.

=== Charts ===
==== Weekly charts ====
Chart (1990)	Peak position
Canada Top Singles (RPM)	3
US Billboard Hot 100	11
US Adult Contemporary (Billboard)	34
US Mainstream Rock (Billboard)	2

==== Year-end charts ====
Chart (1990)	Position
Canada Top Singles (RPM)	47
US Album Rock Tracks (Billboard)	40

== Cliff Richard version ==
"Peace in Our Time"

Single by Cliff Richard

from the album The Album
- B-side: "Somebody Loves You"
- Released: 15 March 1993
- Length: 5:46
- Label: EMI
- Songwriters: Andy Hill; Peter Sinfield
- Producers: Paul Moessl; Cliff Richard

Cliff Richard singles chronology
"I Still Believe in You" (1992)	"Peace in Our Time" (1993)	"Human Work of Art" (1993)

Music video
- "Peace in Our Time" on YouTube

In 1993, British singer and actor Cliff Richard released a cover of "Peace in Our Time" as the second single from his 31st studio album, The Album (1993). The song was produced by him with Paul Moessl and released in March 1993, by EMI Records. It peaked at number eight on the UK Singles Chart, and was a top-30 hit in Ireland and a top-60 hit in Germany.

=== Critical reception ===
Alan Jones from Music Week gave Richard's version of the song three out of five, writing, "The Chamberlain-esque title conceals a commercial single penned by Andy Hill and Peter Sinfield, who wrote many of Bucks Fizz's finest. Upbeat, well sung and hopeful, with bounding, club-friendly Harding/Curnow mixes."

=== Charts ===
Chart (1993)	Peak position
Europe (Eurochart Hot 100)	28
Europe (European Hit Radio)	35
Germany (GfK)	59
Ireland (IRMA)	26
UK Singles (Official Charts)	8
UK Airplay (Music Week)	15
