= Running Back (Eddie Money song) =

Single by Eddie Money

from the album Playing for Keeps
- B-side: "Satin Angel"
- Released: 1980
- Genre: Rock
- Length: 4:01 (Album version); 3:44 (7" version)
- Label: Columbia
- Songwriter: Radcliffe "Dougie" Bryan

Eddie Money singles chronology
"Let's Be Lovers Again" (1980)	"Running Back" (1980)	"Think I'm in Love" (1982)

"Running Back" is a song by American rock singer Eddie Money, from his album Playing for Keeps in 1980. It was released as a single and reached #78 on the Billboard Hot 100.

== Chart performance ==
Chart (1980)	Peak position
US Billboard Hot 100	78
