= Life for the Taking =

Studio album by Eddie Money
- Released: 1978
- Recorded: 1978
- Genres: Rock, pop rock
- Length: 40:23
- Labels: Wolfgang, Columbia
- Producer: Bruce Botnick

Eddie Money chronology
Eddie Money (1977)	Life for the Taking (1978)	Playing for Keeps (1980)

Singles from Life for the Taking
- 1. "Maybe I'm a Fool" Released: January 1979; 2. "Can't Keep a Good Man Down" Released: May 1979; 3. "Maureen" Released: July 1979

Professional ratings
Review scores
Source	Rating
AllMusic	3/5 stars
The Rolling Stone Album Guide	2.5/5 stars

Life for the Taking is the second studio album by American rock musician Eddie Money. It was recorded and released in late 1978 in the US and January 1979 in the UK on manager Bill Graham's Wolfgang imprint via Columbia Records. The album includes the singles "Can't Keep a Good Man Down", "Maybe I'm a Fool" and "Maureen". The album is also notable for containing the concert staple "Gimme Some Water", a song Money would perform right up until his death in 2019.

With Money seemingly endlessly on the road promoting his previous debut album, this effort was primarily written in hotel rooms with a variety of band members and worked up during sound checks prior to performances. The final track, "Call on Me" was often interjected into the set lists prior to the release of this album and received a strong response in spite of its more soulful, less frantic composure.

This album also marked a conscious effort to expand Money's audience with the inclusion of several more pop and dance oriented numbers. This direction would continue to be expanded upon with the subsequent release Playing for Keeps. The album was met with less enthusiastic critical response than its predecessor with a number of the pundits citing a weakness of quality songwriting and the inconsistency of style as pitfalls.

Money resumed his frantic promotion and touring schedule upon the release of this album. The cover shot plays on a rendition of the artist mocking his debut album artwork but with an obvious worn and tired appearance.

As with the previous release, both singles were issued in promotion only edited versions, while the retail releases featured tracks from the album as B-sides. By now, Money was headlining mid-sized venues and a number of the dates featured the then up-and-coming Pat Benatar as support.

== Track listing ==
No.	Title	Writer(s)	Length
1.	"Life for the Taking"	Eddie Money	4:45
2.	"Can't Keep a Good Man Down"	Money, Dan Alexander, Chris Solberg	3:37
3.	"Nightmare"	Money, James Lyon	4:22
4.	"Gimme Some Water"	Money	3:38
5.	"Rock and Roll the Place"	Money, Lyon	3:04
6.	"Maybe I'm a Fool"	Money, Lloyd Chiate, Lee Garrett, Robert Taylor	3:04
7.	"Love the Way You Love Me"	Money, Steve Howard	3:37
8.	"Maureen"	Money, Ernie Makaway, Chiate, Solberg	3:35
9.	"Nobody"	Money, Lyon	4:40
10.	"Call On Me"	Jeremy Storch, Money	6:01
Total length:			40:23

== Personnel ==
Musicians

- Eddie Money – vocals, harmony vocals, acoustic piano, harmonica, arrangements, horn arrangements
- Nicky Hopkins – acoustic piano
- Alan Pasqua – acoustic piano
- Randy Nichols – organ, harmony vocals
- Steve Porcaro – synthesizers
- Jesse Bradman – acoustic piano (5)
- Greg Phillinganes – acoustic piano (6)
- Jimmy Lyon – guitars (1–3, 5, 7–10, arrangements
- David Lindley – guitars (4)
- Lloyd Chaite – guitars (6)
- John Whitney – guitars (6)
- Lonnie Turner – bass (1–4, 6–10)
- Tim Sheridan – bass (5)
- Gary Mallaber – drums (1–4, 6–10)
- Dave Danza – drums (5)
- Tom Scott – horns, horn arrangements
- Albhy Galuten – string arrangements and conductor
- Darrell Verdusco – harmony vocals
- Angela Winbush – harmony vocals

Production

- Bruce Botnick – producer (for Wolfgang Productions)
- Andy Johns – recording, mixing
- Rik Pekkonen – engineer
- Wally Traugott – mastering
- Eddie Money – cover concept
- Mick Brigden – art direction
- Nancy Donald – design
- Gary Heery – photography

== Charts ==
Chart (1979)	Peak position
US Billboard 200	17
