= Where's the Party? =

Studio album by Eddie Money
- Released: October 1983
- Studio: Record Plant (Los Angeles, California); The Pasha Music House (Hollywood, California)
- Genre: Rock, pop rock
- Length: 37:37
- Label: Wolfgang, Columbia
- Producer: Eddie Money; Tom Dowd; Spencer Proffer

Eddie Money chronology
No Control (1982)	Where's the Party? (1983)	Can't Hold Back (1986)

Singles from Where's the Party?
- 1. "The Big Crash" Released: 1983; 2. "Club Michelle" Released: 1984

Professional ratings
Review scores
Source	Rating
AllMusic	2/5 stars

Where's the Party? is the fifth studio album by American rock musician Eddie Money. The album was released in October 1983, by Wolfgang Records and Columbia Records.

Money described the album as more upbeat and positive than his previous album No Control (1982), saying, "We're ready to rock.... We're all in a party mood, and the album reflects that."

The album peaked at #67 on the Billboard 200 album chart, making it Money's lowest-charting album up to that time. Critic Lennox Samuels of Independent Press Service wrote in his review, "The party's not on this record, anyway. Side 1 is an undistinguished assortment of mid- to uptempo rock tunes." Samuels did praise the track "The Big Crash", which he described as "a bouncy dance tune with an effective interplay between John Nelson's lead guitar and Duane Hitchings' synthesizer," and noted that "Leave It to Me" appeared to show Money "venturing into new music", with a sound close to that of many popular synth-bands of the time.

In a 1986 interview promoting his following album, Can't Hold Back, Money stated that Where's the Party? "sold about 280,000 units. For the money I spent on it, it wasn't enough."

Where's the Party? was Eddie's last album to carry the Wolfgang Records logo.

== Track listing ==
No.	Title	Writer(s)	Length
1.	"Maybe Tomorrow"	Eddie Money, Steve Farris, Alan Pasqua, Gary O'Connor	4:54
2.	"Bad Girls"	Money, Duane Hitchings	3:26
3.	"Club Michelle"	Money, Ralph Carter, Mitchell Froom, Raymond Charles Burton	4:06
4.	"Back on the Road"	Money, Carter, Davitt Sigerson	3:05
5.	"Don't Let Go"	Money, Carter, Mark Radice	4:05
6.	"The Big Crash"	Money, Hitchings	3:39
7.	"Where's the Party?"	Money, Carter	3:54
8.	"Leave It to Me"	Money, Hitchings	4:07
9.	"Backtrack"	Money	6:21
Total length:			37:37

== Singles ==
- "The Big Crash" (1983) #54 US Billboard (22 weeks)
- "Club Michelle" (1984) #66 US Billboard (7 weeks)

== Personnel ==
- Eddie Money – vocals, saxophone (1, 7), acoustic piano (9)
- Alan Pasqua – synthesizers (1)
- Duane Hitchings – synthesizers (2, 6–8)
- Mitchell Froom – synthesizers (3, 5)
- Randy Nichols – backing vocals (3, 7), Hammond B3 organ (4, 6, 9), synthesizers (9)
- John Nelson – lead guitars (1–7), backing vocals (2), rhythm guitars (4)
- Steve Farris – rhythm guitars (1–3, 8), lead guitars (8)
- Jimmy Lyon – lead guitars (9)
- Ralph Carter – bass (2–9), backing vocals (2, 7), rhythm guitars (6, 7)
- Mike Botts – drums (1, 3, 5, 6), percussion (7)
- Gary Mallaber – drums (2)
- Gary Ferguson – drums (4, 8)
- Art Wood – drums (9)
- Paulinho da Costa – percussion (1, 2, 6)
- Frank Linx – percussion (1), rhythm guitars (3, 6)
- The "T-Twins" – backing vocals (2)
- Annie Sampson – backing vocals (7)

=== Production ===
- Eddie Money – producer, mixing (1–8), cover concept
- Tom Dowd – producer (1–8)
- Spencer Proffer – producer (9)
- Dennis Kirk – engineer (1–8)
- Andy Johns – mixing (1–8)
- Larry Brown – engineer (9)
- Phil Jamtaas – assistant engineer (1–8)
- Mick Brigden – art direction
- Tony Lane – art direction
- Randee St. Nicholas – photography

== Charts ==
Chart (1983)	Peak position
US Billboard 200	67
