= Nothing to Lose (Eddie Money album) =

Studio album by Eddie Money
- Released: October 4, 1988
- Recorded: Early–Mid 1988
- Studios: Rumbo Recorders (Canoga Park, California); ATR Studios (Lafayette, California); Skip Saylor Recording (Los Angeles, California); The Grey Room (Hollywood, California); Can-Am Recorders (Tarzana, California)
- Genres: Rock, pop rock
- Length: 45:51
- Label: Columbia
- Producers: Richie Zito; Eddie Money

Eddie Money chronology
Can't Hold Back (1986)	Nothing to Lose (1988)	Greatest Hits: The Sound of Money (1989)

Singles from Nothing to Lose
- 1. "Walk on Water" Released: October 4, 1988; 2. "The Love in Your Eyes" Released: 1989; 3. "Let Me In" Released: 1989

Nothing to Lose is the seventh studio album by American rock musician Eddie Money. The album was released on October 4, 1988, by Columbia Records. The top-ten hit "Walk on Water" featured a guest appearance from original band member Jimmy Lyon on lead guitar.

Professional ratings
Review scores
Source	Rating
AllMusic	3/5 stars

== Track listing ==
No.	Title	Writer(s)	Length
1.	"Walk on Water"	Jesse Harms	4:43
2.	"Magic"	Harms, Eddie Money, Richie Zito	4:41
3.	"The Love in Your Eyes"	David Paul Bryant, Steve Dubin, Adrian Gurvitz	4:09
4.	"Let Me In"	Paul Gordon, Dennis Matkosky	4:58
5.	"Boardwalk Baby"	Diane Warren	5:08
6.	"Forget About Love"	Todd Cerney, Money, Tom Whitlock, Zito	4:43
7.	"Pull Together"	Dean Merino	4:46
8.	"Far Cry from a Heartache"	Cerney, Money, Whitlock, Zito	4:40
9.	"Bad Boy"	Greg Lowry, Money	3:26
10.	"Dancing with Mr. Jitters"	Money, John Nelson	4:37
Total length:			45:51

== Personnel ==
- Eddie Money – vocals, keyboards, harmonica, saxophone
- Kim Bullard – keyboards, keyboard and synthesizer arrangements
- Kevin Gilbert – keyboards, keyboard and synthesizer arrangements, backing vocals (10)
- Jesse Harms – keyboards, backing vocals (1)
- Richie Zito – keyboards, guitars, backing vocals (1)
- Tommy Girvin – guitars, backing vocals (10)
- Jimmy Lyon – guitars
- John Nelson – guitars
- Stevie Salas – guitars
- John Pierce – bass
- Mike Baird – drums
- Danny Hull – saxophones
- David Woodford – saxophones
- Tommy Funderburk – backing vocals
- Joe Pizzulo – backing vocals
- Tracy Harris – backing vocals (1)
- Julia Tillman Waters – backing vocals (4)
- Luther Waters – backing vocals (4)
- Maxine Waters Willard – backing vocals (4)
- Oren Waters – backing vocals (4)
- Bobbie Eakes – backing vocals (5)
- Joe Esposito – backing vocals (5)
- Donny Gerrard – backing vocals (5)
- Bruce Sudano – backing vocals (5)
- Joe Turano – backing vocals (5)
- John Rowe – backing vocals (10)
- Annie Sampson – backing vocals (10)

== Production ==
- Eddie Money – producer, arrangements
- Richie Zito – producer, arrangements
- Phil Kaffel – engineer, mixing (5–10)
- Chris Lord-Alge – mixing (1–4)
- Julian Stoll – assistant engineer
- Duncan Rowe – additional engineer (10)
- John Rowe – additional engineer (10)
- Patrick MacDougal – mix assistant (1–4)
- Jim Dineen – mix assistant (5–10)
- Tom Johnson – mix assistant (6–8, 10)
- Stan Katayama – mix assistant (6–8, 10)
- Toby Wright – mix assistant (6–8, 10)
- Katy Parks – production coordinator
- Tony Lane – art direction, design
- Nancy Donald – art direction, design
- Moshe Brakha – photography
- Bill Graham Management – direction
- Kevin Burns, Mick Brigden, Nick Clainos, Cheryl Hodgson, Cynthia Parsons, Arnold Pustilnik, Pat Thomas and Morty Wiggins – management

== Charts ==
Chart (1988)	Peak position
US Billboard 200	49
