= Playing for Keeps (Eddie Money album) =

Studio album by Eddie Money
- Released: July 1980
- Studios: Record Plant (Los Angeles and Sausalito, California)
- Genres: Rock, pop rock
- Length: 36:32
- Labels: Wolfgang, Columbia
- Producer: Ron Nevison

Eddie Money chronology
Life for the Taking (1978)	Playing for Keeps (1980)	No Control (1982)

Singles from Playing for Keeps
- 1. "Get a Move On" Released: 1979; 2. "Let's Be Lovers Again" Released: 1980; 3. "Running Back" Released: 1980

Professional ratings
Review scores
Source	Rating
AllMusic	2/5 stars

Playing for Keeps is the third studio album by American rock musician Eddie Money, released in July 1980 by Wolfgang Records and Columbia Records. It continues the expansion to include pop oriented tracks that began with the previous album.

The inclusion of the reggae-influenced "Running Back" as well as the syrupy duet "Let's Be Lovers Again" with Valerie Carter are indicative of the attempt to maintain rocker status and successfully migrate into the pop charts at the same time.

Several of the tracks were written in conjunction with band member Randy Nichols who toured and recorded with Money at the time.

"Get a Move On"- also featured on the soundtrack from Americathon featuring John Nelson slide guitar - received AOR airplay as did "Trinidad", but the singles chosen for release didn't stir much excitement with reviewers or radio.

The album was briefly released on the CD format, but quickly withdrawn. It had not been reissued on CD until 2012 when the four first albums were remastered and re-released by a European label named Rock Candy.

Following the end of the tour supporting this album, Money experienced a collapse and subsequent hospitalization. A notable break allowing for recuperation followed.

== Track listing ==
No.	Title	Writer(s)	Length
1.	"Trinidad"	Lonnie Turner, Greg Douglass, Eddie Money	5:08
2.	"Running Back"	Radcliffe "Dougie" Bryan	4:01
3.	"The Wish"	Money, James Lyon	3:58
4.	"Get a Move On"	Money, Paul Collins, Lloyd Chiate	3:47
5.	"When You Took My Heart"	Randy Nichols, Darrell Verdusco, Jerry Marcellino, David Sieff	3:36
6.	"Satin Angel"	David Lewark, Money	4:04
7.	"Let's Be Lovers Again"	Money, Lyon	3:54
8.	"Nobody Knows"	Nichols, Money	3:54
9.	"Million Dollar Girl"	Money	4:30
Total length:			36:32

== Personnel ==
- Eddie Money – vocals, backing vocals
- Randy Nichols – keyboards, backing vocals
- Greg Douglass – guitars (1)
- Jimmy Lyon – guitars, guitar solos (1, 3, 5, 8)
- David Lewark – guitars, guitar solos (6, 9)
- John Nelson – slide guitar (4)
- Lonnie Turner – bass (1)
- Bob Glaub – bass (2, 5, 7–9)
- Kenny Lewis – bass (3, 4, 6)
- Gary Mallaber – drums (1, 2, 5–9), percussion (1, 2, 5–9)
- Carmine Appice – drums (3, 4)
- Emilio Castillo – horns (9)
- Steve Kupka – horns (9)
- Ron Nevison – backing vocals
- Myrna Matthews – backing vocals (2)
- Marti McCall – backing vocals (2)
- Julia Tillman Waters – backing vocals (2)
- Angelo Arouri – additional backing vocals (4)
- Maureen McCormick – additional backing vocals (4)
- Valerie Carter – vocals (7)

=== Production ===
- Ron Nevison – producer, arrangements, recording
- Eddie Money – arrangements
- Mike Clink – recording
- Walter Borchers – assistant engineer
- The Mastering Lab (Hollywood, California) – mastering location
- Deandra Miller – production assistant
- Bob Levy – production coordinator
- Mick Brigden – art direction
- Lane/Donald – design
- Bonnie Schiffman – back cover and sleeve photography
- David Tan – front cover photography

== Charts ==
Chart (1980)	Peak position
US Billboard 200	35
