= Love and Money (album) =

Studio album by Eddie Money
- Released: May 30, 1995
- Recorded: 1994–1995
- Studios: Rumbo Recorders, Sony Music Studios, MIDI Madness Studio and Image Recording Studios (Los Angeles, California); Cheyanne Recorders (Woodland Hills, California); The Barn (Tarzana, California); The Enterprise and Master Control (Burbank, California)
- Genres: Rock, pop rock
- Length: 45:17
- Label: Wolfgang
- Producers: Eddie Money; Richie Zito; Curt Cuomo; Kim Bullard; Dennis Matkosky

Eddie Money chronology
Unplug It In (1992)	Love and Money (1995)	Good as Gold (1996)

Professional ratings
Review scores
Source	Rating
Allmusic	2/5 stars
American Music Channel	4/5 stars

Love and Money is the ninth studio album by rock artist Eddie Money. It was released in 1995.

== Track listing ==
1. "After This Love Is Gone" (John Clifforth, Larry Tagg, Sheppard Solomon) - 4:31
2. "She's Like a Movie" (Curt Cuomo, Eddie Money, Tommy Girvin) - 4:30
3. "Run Your Hurt Away" (David Porter, Isaac Hayes) - 3:16
4. "I'll Be the Fire" (Cuomo, Don Kirkpatrick, Money) - 4:24
5. "Take It from the Heart" (Cuomo, Kirkpatrick, Money) - 4:15
6. "Died a Thousand Times" (Dennis Matkosky, Phil Roy) - 3:48
7. "Just No Givin' Up" - (Cuomo, Money) 3:47
8. "I'm Comin'" (Money) - 3:57
9. "Almost Like We Never Met" (Cuomo, Money, John Nelson) - 4:17
10. "Running Out of Reasons" (Cuomo, Money, Larry Lee, Girvin) - 4:37
11. "There Will Never Be Another You" (Cuomo, Money, Todd Cerney) - 3:55

Note

- Some copies omit "Running Out of Reasons"

== Personnel ==
- Eddie Money – vocals, arrangements (2–4, 7–9, 11), backing vocals (7, 11)
- Kim Bullard – keyboards (1, 4, 5, 10), percussion (4), keyboard bass (5, 10)
- Curt Cuomo – keyboards (1–5, 7, 8, 10, 11), arrangements (1–5, 7–11), backing vocals (1, 2, 4, 7, 8, 10, 11), percussion (2, 4, 5, 11), drums (3), drum programming (3, 5), acoustic piano (9, 10)
- Dennis Matkosky – acoustic piano (6), organ (6), keyboards (6), drum programming (6), arrangements (6)
- Mike Finnigan – Hammond B3 organ (8, 9)
- Tommy Girvin – guitars (1–4, 7, 9–11), backing vocals (1, 2, 5, 7–11), rhythm guitar (8)
- Richie Zito – guitars (1), arrangements (1, 5, 10)
- Don Kirkpatrick – guitars (5, 11)
- John Shanks – guitars (6)
- Tony Artino – additional guitars (7)
- Brian Young – guitars (8)
- Larry Tagg – bass (1)
- Mark Harris – bass (2, 4)
- Ricky Phillips – bass (3)
- Don Schiff – bass (7, 8, 11)
- Steve Kershisnic – bass (9)
- John Robinson – drums (1, 10)
- Kenny Aronoff – drums (2, 4, 7–9, 11), percussion (2, 4, 7, 11)
- Paulinho da Costa – percussion (6)
- John Snider – percussion (8)
- Sheila E. – percussion (10)
- David "Woody" Woodford – horns (3), saxophone (7)
- Boney James – saxophone (4, 11)
- Phil Roy – arrangements (6)
- Tommy Funderburk – backing vocals (1, 5, 10)
- Lenita Erickson – backing vocals (2)
- Michael Ian Elias – backing vocals (4)
- Shandel Farrior – backing vocals (4)
- Mortonette Jenkins – backing vocals (4)
- Lisa Frazier – backing vocals (6)
- Karen Grant – backing vocals (6)
- Robin Beck – backing vocals (8, 9)
- Timothy B. Schmit – backing vocals (9)
- Monty Byrom – backing vocals (10)

=== Production ===
- Eddie Money – producer
- Richie Zito – producer (1, 5, 10)
- Curt Cuomo – producer (2–4, 7–9, 11), engineer (3, 4), recording (3, 4), mixing (3, 4)
- Kim Bullard – producer (4), engineer (4), recording (4), mixing (4)
- Dennis Matkosky – producer (6), engineer (6), recording (6)
- Rob Jacobs – engineer (1, 2, 5, 7–10), recording (1, 2, 5, 7–10), mixing (1, 5, 7–10)
- Chris Lord-Alge – mixing (2)
- Mark Endert – engineer (3), recording (3), mixing (3)
- Frank Rosato – engineer (4), recording (4)
- Toby Wright – engineer (4), recording (4)
- Brian Malouf – mixing (6)
- Brian Reeves – engineer (11), recording (11), mixing (11)
- Doug Sax – mastering at The Mastering Lab (Hollywood, California)
- Mick Brigden – art direction
- Ray Etzler – art direction
- Monica Reskala – design
- Michael Halsband – photography
