= Walk on Water (Eddie Money song) =

Single by Eddie Money

from the album Nothing to Lose
- B-side: "Dancing with Mr. Jitters"
- Released: October 4, 1988
- Genre: Pop rock
- Length: 4:41
- Label: Columbia
- Songwriter: Jesse Harms
- Producers: Richie Zito; Eddie Money

Eddie Money singles chronology
| "We Should Be Sleeping" (1987) | "Walk on Water" (1988) | "The Love in Your Eyes" (1989) |

"Walk on Water" is a song by American rock singer Eddie Money from his album Nothing to Lose in 1988. Written by keyboardist Jesse Harms (who also performed on the track), the tune was released as a single and reached number nine on the Billboard Hot 100 (Money's final top ten hit) and number two on the Album Rock Tracks chart. It only managed to hit 128 in the UK. It also features a guitar solo from Jimmy Lyon, who had previously been a member of Eddie Money's band.

== Critical reception ==
Upon its release, Billboard called "Walk on Water" a "pop offering" which "sports a prominent rock edge that should prove to be Money in the bank for hit status at radio". Cash Box praised it as a "terrific song that is laden with hooks" and "rocks where necessary, with a chunky guitar sound that puts it solidly on the AOR track". The reviewer added, "The best single that Eddie Money has released in ages, we predict this one will be a big record for [him]."

== Chart history ==
=== Weekly charts ===
| Chart (1988–1989) | Peak position |
|---|---|
| US Billboard Hot 100 | 9 |
| US Billboard Album Rock Tracks | 2 |
| US Billboard Adult Contemporary | 34 |
| US Cash Box Top 100 | 7 |

=== Year-end charts ===
| Chart (1989) | Position |
|---|---|
| United States (Billboard) | 72 |
