= Eddie Money (album) =

Studio album by Eddie Money
- Released: December 1977
- Recorded: The Record Plant (Los Angeles, California)
- Genres: Rock; pop rock
- Length: 39:23
- Labels: Wolfgang, Columbia
- Producer: Bruce Botnick

Eddie Money chronology
Eddie Money (1977)	Life for the Taking (1978)

Singles from Eddie Money
- 1. "Baby Hold On" Released: December 1977; 2. "Two Tickets to Paradise" Released: June 1978; 3. "You've Really Got a Hold on Me" Released: 1978

Eddie Money is the debut studio album by American musician Eddie Money, released in December 1977 by Wolfgang Records, a subsidiary of major label Columbia. Money, a Brooklyn native, grew up interested in music. In 1968, he moved to Berkeley, California, where he became a staple of Bay Area nightclubs. Rock impresario Bill Graham subsequently discovered Money and signed him to his Wolfgang imprint.

The album was mainly written by Money, though half of its contents were also credited to guitarist Jimmy Lyon. Eddie Money was successful in the U.S., where it was eventually certified double platinum, denoting two million copies shipped. Its singles were hits on AOR radio, with "Baby Hold On" and "Two Tickets to Paradise" crossing over into the Top 40 format. The former charted highest, reaching number 11 on the Billboard Hot 100. It is Money's highest-selling album.

== Background ==
The album was a studio rendering of Money's live show at the time, and was recorded during the summer of 1977. It features almost entirely original compositions that the band had written and honed during their live performances in Bay Area venues. Containing two songs that achieved generous radio airplay ("Two Tickets to Paradise" and "Baby Hold On"), the album peaked at number 37 on the charts, establishing Money as a successful artist. "Two Tickets to Paradise" remains one of his most frequently played songs. A third single, a unique take on the Motown classic "You Really Got a Hold on Me" received considerable airplay but failed to crack the top 20.

Managed by Bill Graham and booked by Frank Barcelona's Premier Talent, Money quickly established himself as both the consummate performer and record peddler who often spent afternoons doing record store promotions and radio interviews prior to his on stage appearances.

This album features Money on vocals, Jimmy Lyon on guitar, saxophone player Tom Scott, and former Steve Miller Band members, bassist Lonnie Turner and drummer Gary Mallaber. Lyon also co-wrote about half of the album's tracks, yet he would leave the band in 1982.

== Critical reception ==
Retrospective professional reviews
Review scores
Source	Rating
AllMusic	4.5/5 stars
Christgau's Record Guide	C−
Encyclopedia of Popular Music	3/5 stars
The Rolling Stone Album Guide	2.5/5 stars

Village Voice critic Robert Christgau was unenthusiastic about the album and wrote in his "Consumer Guide": "Sorry, girls (and guys)—live inspection reveals that the sleek stud on the cover (and in the ads) is as pudgy and sloppy as his voice. He even has jowls. Watch those cheeseburgers, Eddie boy, or you'll never get to the caviar." AllMusic's Mark Allan, on the other hand, found it "long on craft but not without inspiration" and observed "deservedly shot radio-ready tunes" in "Two Tickets to Paradise" and "Baby Hold On", while highlighting "Wanna Be a Rock 'n' Roll Star" as the album's "spirited" highlight that "spells out the game plan" of Money and his collaborators. In The Rolling Stone Album Guide (1992), the singer was appraised by the time of his first album as "defiantly retrograde" and a distillation or dilution of "the Seger-Springsteen approach into a pop formula", as "Eddie Money parlayed his straining vocals and average-guy stance into a pair of unremarkable but catchy hit singles. 'Baby, Hold On' and 'Two Tickets to Paradise' (both from the debut) came as a godsend to meat-and-potatoes rockers — and radio programmers — who felt vaguely threatened by the encroaching onslaught of punk and disco." Billboard gave positive results and noted "He stands perhaps a lighter, but still gutsy voiced [Bruce Springsteen performance]." Cashbox also gave positive results, stating, he does indeed show that he's got the stuff, primarily as a singer but also as an instrumentalist and a writer.

== Track listing ==
No.	Title	Writer(s)	Length
1.	"Two Tickets to Paradise"	Eddie Money	3:57
2.	"You've Really Got a Hold on Me"	Smokey Robinson	3:49
3.	"Wanna Be a Rock 'n' Roll Star"	Money, Chris Solberg	3:58
4.	"Save a Little Room in Your Heart for Me"	Money	4:52
5.	"So Good to Be in Love Again"	Money, Jimmy Lyon	4:11
6.	"Baby Hold On"	Money, Lyon	3:33
7.	"Don't Worry"	Money, Lyon	3:43
8.	"Jealousys"	Money, Lyon	3:57
9.	"Got to Get Another Girl"	Money, Lyon, John Nelson	3:25
10.	"Gamblin' Man"	Money, Dan Alexander, Lyon	3:58
Total length:			39:23

== Personnel ==
- Eddie Money – vocals, keyboards, harmonica, saxophone
- Jimmy Lyon – guitars
- Gary Mallaber – drums, percussion
- Lonnie Turner – bass guitar
- Gene Pardue – drums
- Bob "Pops" Popwell – bass guitar
- Tom Scott – alto saxophone, tenor saxophone
- Alan Pasqua – keyboards
- Glenn Symmonds – drums
- Randy Nichols – keyboards, synthesizer, background vocals
- Freddie Webb – keyboards
- Kevin Calhoun – percussion
- Jo Baker – second vocal on "Baby Hold On"

Production

- Produced by Bruce Botnick
- Engineered by Andy Johns

== Charts ==
Chart (1977–78)	Peak position
Canada (RPM)	24
US Billboard 200	37

== Certifications ==
Region	Certification	Certified units/sales
Canada (Music Canada)	Platinum	100,000^{^}
United States (RIAA)	2× Platinum	2,000,000^{^}
^{^} Shipments figures based on certification alone.
