= Can't Hold Back (Eddie Money album) =

Studio album by Eddie Money
- Released: August 8, 1986
- Recorded: 1985–1986
- Studios: Oasis Recording Studios (North Hollywood, California); Fantasy Studios (Berkeley, California); R.O. Studios (Concord, California); Can-Am Recorders (Tarzana, California)
- Genres: Rock, pop rock
- Length: 40:30
- Label: Columbia
- Producers: Eddie Money and Richie Zito (except "One Chance"; produced by Eddie Money, Richie Zito and David Kershenbaum)

Eddie Money chronology
Where's the Party? (1983)	Can't Hold Back (1986)	Nothing to Lose (1988)

Professional ratings
Review scores
Source	Rating
AllMusic	4.5/5 stars
Kerrang!	4.5/5 stars

Can't Hold Back is the sixth studio album by American rock musician Eddie Money. The album was released on August 8, 1986, by Columbia Records. It contains one of Money's biggest hits, "Take Me Home Tonight" which helped bring both himself and Ronnie Spector back to the spotlight. The album was certified platinum by the RIAA in August 1987.

"I Wanna Go Back" is a Billy Satellite cover and first appeared on the band's eponymous 1984 debut album. The song "Stranger in a Strange Land", written by Money with Henry Small and Tom Whitlock, was covered by John Entwistle. The song was featured on Entwistle's solo album, The Rock, on which Small sang lead vocals.

== Reception ==
Mike DeGagne of AllMusic said that "Money have a perfect balance of catchy, hook-induced music and well-written lyrics, he also sports more confidence and energy throughout Can't Hold Back's material than ever before. Although tailored for radio, the songs aren't hindered by what could have been a mediocre, humdrum rock formula. Instead, Money infuses enough of his slightly sexy vocal character into the cuts to give them the added sparkle and crispness needed to rise above his past endeavors."

Billboard described the album as a "gutsy rock 'n' roll".

Cashbox magazine described the album as "Passionate and powerful pop/rock".

== Track listing ==
Side one
No.	Title	Writer(s)	Length
1.	"Take Me Home Tonight" (duet with Ronnie Spector)	Mick Leeson, Peter Vale, Phil Spector, Ellie Greenwich, Jeff Barry	3:30
2.	"One Love"	Eddie Money, Davitt Sigerson, Duncan Rowe	4:11
3.	"I Wanna Go Back"	Monty Byrom, Ira Walker, Danny Chauncey	3:56
4.	"Endless Nights"	John Cesario, Michele Collyer, Steve Mullen	3:23
5.	"One Chance"	Stan Meissner, Fred Mollin	4:45

Side two
No.	Title	Writer(s)	Length
6.	"We Should Be Sleeping"	Money, Greg Lowry, Kevin Burns, Glenn A. Thompson	3:56
7.	"Bring On the Rain"	Money, Billy Ryan	4:54
8.	"I Can't Hold Back"	Money, Michael Politeau, Sigerson, Richie Zito	3:50
9.	"Stranger in a Strange Land"	Henry Small, Tom Whitlock, Money	3:34
10.	"Calm Before the Storm"	Money, John Nelson	4:31

== Singles ==
- "Take Me Home Tonight" (1986) #4 US
- "I Wanna Go Back" (1986) #14 US
- "Endless Nights" (1987) #21 US
- "We Should Be Sleeping" (1987) #90 US

== Personnel ==
- Eddie Money – lead vocals, keyboards (7), synthesizer arrangements (2)
- Richie Zito – keyboards (1, 7, 9), guitars (2–10), synthesizer arrangements (2–4, 8)
- Arthur Barrow – keyboards (1, 6, 9, 10), bass guitar (1, 6, 9, 10)
- Gary Chang – keyboards (2–4, 8), synthesizer arrangements (2–4, 8)
- Steve George – keyboards (5), backing vocals (5)
- Ed Uliberry – keyboards (7)
- John Nelson – guitars (1, 2, 5, 7, 9) guitar solo (4, 10), acoustic guitar solo (5), lead guitar (8, 10)
- Duncan Rowe – additional guitar arrangements (2)
- Randy Jackson – bass guitar (3, 4, 8)
- Nathan East – bass guitar (5)
- Greg Lowry – bass guitar (7)
- Mike Baird – drums (1, 2, 4–8, 10), (Note: There is no drummer credited in the liner notes for Track 3 ("I Wanna Go Back"); the uncredited drummer is likely Baird, given the similarity in drum tone and style between this and the rest of the album's tracks.) drum overdubs (9)
- Pat Mastelotto – drum programming (5)
- Paul Hanson – saxophone (1)
- Danny Hall – saxophone (2, 3)
- Ronnie Spector – additional lead vocals (1)
- Joe Pizzulo – backing vocals (1)
- Pastiche (Sandy Sukhov, Becky West, Jenny Meltzer) – backing vocals (2, 3)
- Richard Page – backing vocals (5)
- Henry Small – backing vocals (9)

== Production ==
- Eddie Money – producer, arrangements, mixing
- Richie Zito – producer, arrangements, mixing
- David Kershenbaum – producer (5), arrangements (5)
- Scott Litt – mixing
- Michael Frondelli – engineer
- Phil Kaffel – engineer
- David Leonard – engineer
- Jim Dineen – second engineer
- Stan Katayama – second engineer
- Samii Taylor – second engineer
- Michael Rosen – additional engineer
- Tom Size – additional engineer
- Howie Weinberg – mastering at Masterdisk (New York City, New York)
- Michael Fagrey – project coordinator, logistics
- Mick Brigden – art direction
- Lane/Donald – design
- Randee St. Nicholas – photography
- Bill Graham – management

== Charts ==
Chart (1986)	Peak position
Canada (RPM)	34
Billboard 200	20

== Certifications ==
Region	Certification	Certified units/sales
Canada (Music Canada)	Gold	50,000^{^}
United States (RIAA)	Platinum	1,000,000^{^}
^{^} Shipments figures based on certification alone.
