= Baby Hold On =

- Vinyl picture sleeve

Single by Eddie Money

from the album Eddie Money
- B-side: "Save a Little Room in Your Heart for Me"
- Released: December 1977
- Recorded: 1977
- Genre: Rock
- Length: 3:03 (single version); 3:33 (album version)
- Label: Columbia
- Songwriters: James Lyon, Eddie Money
- Producer: Bruce Botnick

Eddie Money singles chronology
"Baby Hold On" (1977)	"Two Tickets to Paradise" (1978)

"Baby Hold On" is a song recorded by American rock singer Eddie Money. It was written by Money and guitarist Jimmy Lyon and released in 1977 as the first single from Money's self-titled debut album. The song reached number 11 on the Billboard Hot 100, number 4 on the Canadian Hot 100, and number 19 on the Kent Music Report.

The song was a big success, and has since been considered one of Eddie Money's most famous songs. It still gets frequent airplay on classic rock and adult contemporary radio stations, even though it never even registered on the adult contemporary charts.

== Content ==
"Baby Hold On" starts with a simple, catchy guitar introduction by Jimmy Lyon. The song contains this similar riff, but builds in intensity as the song progresses.

The song contains the lines "Whatever will be, will be / the future is ours to see", which closely replicate the refrain from "Que Sera, Sera (Whatever Will Be, Will Be)" written by Jay Livingston and Ray Evans as "Whatever will be, will be / The future's not ours to see". When asked about this similarity in 1978, Money commented that his music is "a conglomeration of so many kinds of material."

== Critical reception ==
James Halliday of Rolling Stone magazine gave the song 4/5 stars in 1977. He stated "while 'Baby Hold On' is simple, it's simply catchy and it's bound to get stuck on your head; which is a good thing in this case."

== In popular culture ==
"Baby Hold On" was performed by Eddie Money on Saturday Night Live in 1978 and American Bandstand in 1980. The song was used in the films Queens Logic (1991), Imaginary Heroes (2004), Roll Bounce (2006), A Little Help, Joe Dirt 2: Beautiful Loser (2016) and The Conjuring: The Devil Made Me Do It (2021). while he performed the song on NBC Sunday Night Football in 2011. It served as the opening number Cher performed during her 1989-90 worldwide Heart of Stone Tour.

The song was featured in the video games Grand Theft Auto: Vice City Stories (2006) and Rock Band 3 (2010), on the TV shows, Cold Case S5 E14 "The Cornerstone", Hawaii Five-O S4 E3 "The Last Break", as well as in an episode of the musical television series Take Me Out in 2013. It also appeared in a 2007 Chevrolet Silverado television commercial, and in an episode of The Tonight Show with Jimmy Fallon. The song was covered by John Roberts for the Bob's Burgers episode O.T.: The Outside Toilet.

== Chart performance ==
=== Weekly charts ===
Chart (1978)	Peak position
Australia (Kent Music Report)	19
Canada Top Singles (RPM)	4
Netherlands (Single Top 100)	41
US Billboard Hot 100	11
U.S. Cash Box Top 100	5

=== Year-end charts ===
Chart (1978)	Rank
U.S. Billboard	67
U.S. Cash Box	49
Canada	56
