= I Wanna Go Back =

1984 single by Billy Satellite

Single by Billy Satellite

from the album Billy Satellite
- B-side: "Rockin' Down the Highway"
- Released: December 1984
- Genre: AOR, pop rock
- Length: 3:52
- Label: Capitol; Capitol 5409
- Songwriters: Danny Chauncey; Monty Byrom; Ira Walker
- Producer: Don Gehman

Billy Satellite singles chronology
"Satisfy Me" (1984)	"I Wanna Go Back" (1984)

Audio
- "I Wanna Go Back" on YouTube

Audio sample
- file; help

"I Wanna Go Back"

Single by Eddie Money

from the album Can't Hold Back
- B-side: "Broken Down Chevy"
- Released: December 1986
- Genre: Pop rock; hard rock
- Length: 3:59
- Label: Columbia; Columbia 38-06569
- Songwriters: Danny Chauncey; Monty Byrom; Ira Walker
- Producers: Richie Zito; Eddie Money

Eddie Money singles chronology
"Take Me Home Tonight" (1986)	"I Wanna Go Back" (1986)	"Endless Nights" (1987)

Audio sample
- file; help

Music video
- "I Wanna Go Back" on YouTube

"I Wanna Go Back" is a 1984 song by American rock band Billy Satellite, written by band members Monty Byrom, Danny Chauncey, and Ira Walker. A 1986 cover version of the song by American rock singer Eddie Money was a top 20 hit in 1987.

== Billy Satellite version ==
Released in 1984 as Billy Satellite's second single from their debut album, the song debuted on the Billboard Hot 100 chart on December 8, 1984. It charted for three weeks, peaking at number 78 and at number 72 on Cash Box. Billy Satellite's version is mid-tempo song reliant on synthesizers but containing a short guitar solo in the bridge and some guitar in the outro. The music video begins with the members of the band driving a jeep to Alameda, California, to the site of a previous live show; the latter portion features the band playing in a bar there.

== Gregg Rolie version ==
Gregg Rolie recorded a cover of "I Wanna Go Back" in 1985.

== Eddie Money version ==
Eddie Money covered the song on his 1986 album Can't Hold Back, and it was released as a follow-up single to the Top 10 hit "Take Me Home Tonight". "I Wanna Go Back" reached number 14 on the Billboard Hot 100, number 33 on the Adult Contemporary chart, and number three on the Album Rock Tracks chart in early 1987.

=== Music video ===
The music video to Money's version features him revisiting a high school interspersed with him and his band playing before a concert audience. He briefly follows a mysterious figure through the crowd at the school dance; that figure represents the girl who got away. The video was filmed on Blackwell Street and the then-Dover High School (now The Kubert School) in Dover, New Jersey.

=== Critical reception ===
Upon its release, Billboard described "I Wanna Go Back" as a "hard rock ballad" which "capsulizes grown-up regret". Cash Box called it a "hook-laden mid-tempo rocker" which shows off Money's "grainy, expressive voice" and provides a "solid follow up" to "Take Me Home Tonight". AllMusic's Mike DeGagne said that Money's version of the song had "sincere, semi-ballad charm".

=== Charts ===
Chart (1986–87)	Peak position
U.S. Billboard Hot 100	14
U.S. Billboard Album Rock Tracks	3
U.S. Billboard Adult Contemporary	33
Canadian RPM Top Singles	42
