= Two Tickets to Paradise =

Single by Eddie Money

- Side A of the US single

Single by Eddie Money

from the album Eddie Money
- B-side: "Don't Worry"
- Released: June 1978
- Recorded: 1977
- Genre: Hard rock; power pop
- Length: 3:57 (Album Version); 3:07 (Single Remix)
- Label: Columbia
- Songwriter: Eddie Money
- Producer: Bruce Botnick

Eddie Money singles chronology
| "Baby Hold On" (1977) | "Two Tickets to Paradise" (1978) | "You've Really Got a Hold on Me" (1979) |

"Two Tickets to Paradise" is a song by American rock singer Eddie Money from his 1977 self-titled debut album. It was released as a single in June 1978 and reached number 22 on the US Billboard Hot 100 chart. The song has since become a staple of classic rock radio, and it was Eddie Money's signature song.

== Reception ==
Cash Box called it "an excellent, punchy rocker," saying that the guitars are "fluid and engaging" and the vocals are "rough and ready." The Atlantic said, "It sails off immediately on luxury spools of post–Steely Dan guitar, with a pattering of holiday bongos. Vacation! Getaway! But this is not a song about paradise—no piña colada, no porno sunset. This is a song about longing: longing to get out, to change your life, to be somewhere or somebody else."

== Musical ==
The song title was also used for the title of a musical play, the story of Eddie Money's life and musical career.

== Charts ==
| Chart (1978) | Peak position |
|---|---|
| Australia (Kent Music Report) | 86 |
| Canada Top Singles (RPM) | 14 |
| US Billboard Hot 100 | 22 |
| U.S. Cash Box Top 100 | 20 |
