= Eddie Money =

American musician (1949–2019)

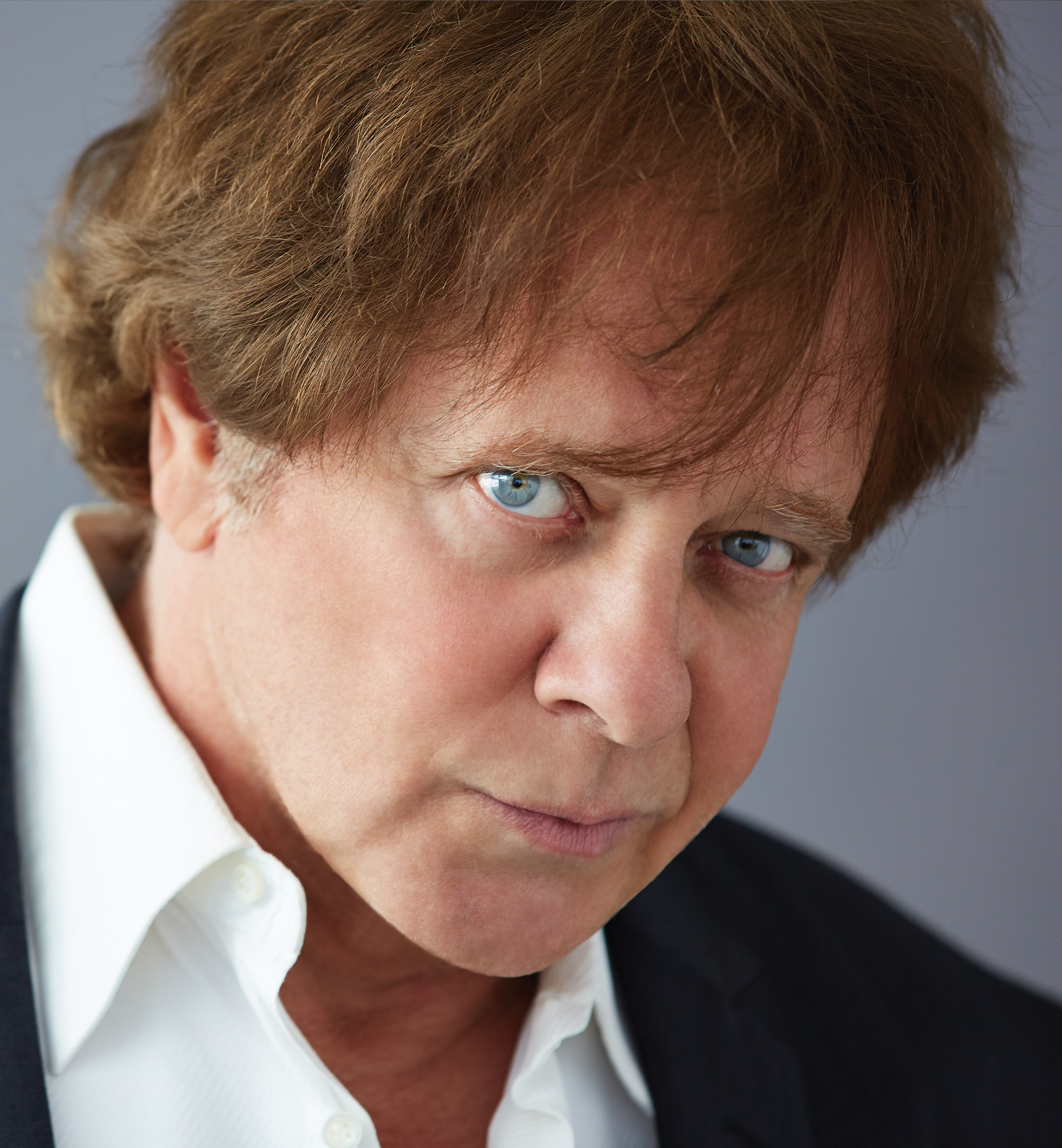
- Money in 2013
- Born: Edward Joseph Mahoney; March 21, 1949; New York City, U.S.
- Died: September 13, 2019 (aged 70); Los Angeles, California, U.S.
- Occupations: Singer; songwriter; multi-instrumentalist
- Years active: 1970s–2019
- Spouses: Margo Lee Walker (1984); Laurie Harris (m. 1989)
- Children: 5
- Musical career
- Origin: Berkeley, California
- Genres: Rock; pop rock; hard rock
- Instruments: Vocals; saxophone; keyboards; harmonica
- Labels: Columbia; Warrior
- Website: www.eddiemoney.com

Edward Joseph Money (né Mahoney; March 21, 1949 – September 13, 2019) was an American singer and songwriter who had his greatest commercial success in the 1970s and 1980s. Money had eleven Top 40 singles, starting with "Baby Hold On" in 1977 and including the Billboard Top 10 hits "Take Me Home Tonight" (1986) and "Walk on Water" (1988). Critic Neil Genzlinger of The New York Times called him a working-class rocker. In 1987, he was nominated for a Grammy Award for Best Male Rock Vocal Performance for "Take Me Home Tonight".

== Early life ==
Edward Joseph Mahoney was born in Manhattan, New York City on March 21, 1949 to a large family of Irish Catholic descent. His parents were Dorothy Elizabeth (née Keller), a homemaker, and Daniel Patrick Mahoney, a police officer. He grew up in Levittown, New York, but spent some teenage years in Woodhaven, Queens, New York City. Money was a street singer from the age of eleven. As a teenager, he played in rock bands to get dates with cheerleaders. He was thrown out of one high school for forging a report card. In 1967, he graduated from Island Trees High School.

At the age of 18, he tried to follow in the footsteps of his grandfather, father and brother as a New York City Police Department trainee. However, after working as a clerk and typist, he left in 1968 to pursue a music career, since the police did not allow him to grow his hair long. "I couldn't see myself in a police uniform for 20 years of my life with short hair," he later said. His bandmates also fired him because they did not want a police officer in the group. His father was unhappy with his decision to play music and tore Jimi Hendrix posters from his wall. He began studying the saxophone during a brief stint at junior college, inspired by rock musicians like David Bowie and Van Morrison who occasionally used the instrument.

In 1968, Money moved to Berkeley, California. There, he studied with vocal coach Judy Davis and took on the stage name Eddie Money, dropping two letters from his last name and sarcastically referring to the fact that he was always broke.

== Career ==
=== Music career ===
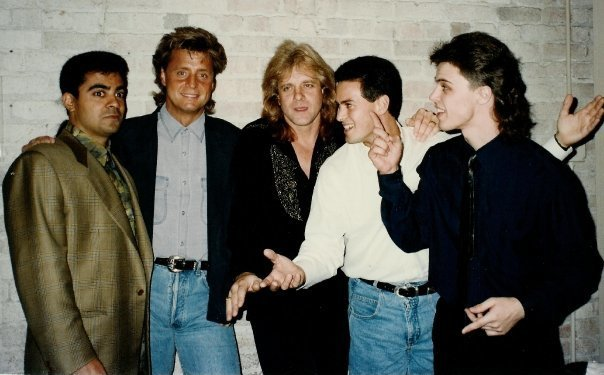
Money (center) in 1990

Money became a regular performer at clubs in the San Francisco Bay Area. After gaining the attention of Bill Graham, he secured a recording contract with Columbia Records, releasing his debut album in 1977. He charted with singles such as "Baby Hold On" and "Two Tickets to Paradise," about visiting his girlfriend despite not having money.

In 1978, Money opened for Santana at Boston's Music Hall. The following year, he sang backing vocals on the bridge section of "I'm Alright," a song written and performed by Kenny Loggins. In 2014, Money claimed Loggins never credited him for his contribution.

In 1982, Money took advantage of the MTV music video scene with his humorous narrative videos for "Think I'm in Love", performed at The Mission Inn Hotel & Spa, and "Shakin'". In the early 1980s, he appeared on The Midnight Special, Fridays, and Solid Gold. In 1978 and 1984, he appeared on American Bandstand.

Money's career slumped following the commercially unsuccessful 1983 album Where's the Party?. However, he made a comeback in 1986 with the album Can't Hold Back, which received a music recording certification of platinum. "Take Me Home Tonight," a single from the album, peaked at No. 4 on the Billboard Hot 100 chart in the United States. Money only agreed to perform the song—which included a line from "Be My Baby," a song Ronnie Spector performed as part of The Ronettes—after Spector agreed to sing the line herself. In 1987, Money was nominated for a Grammy Award for Best Male Rock Vocal Performance for "Take Me Home Tonight." "I Wanna Go Back" and "Endless Nights"—two other singles from the Can't Hold Back album—peaked at No. 14 and No. 21, respectively.

In 1988, Money released Nothing to Lose, which featured the Top 10 hit "Walk on Water" and the Top 40 hit "The Love in Your Eyes."

Beginning in 1992, Money opened the summer concert season for the Pine Knob Music Theater in Clarkston, Michigan, where he would return to open the venue for 27 consecutive years. In 1996, he wrote the theme music to Quack Pack, a Disney cartoon.

Money was inducted into the Long Island Music Hall of Fame in 2008. In January 2010, he performed a medley of his hit singles during the halftime performance at the Liberty Bowl.

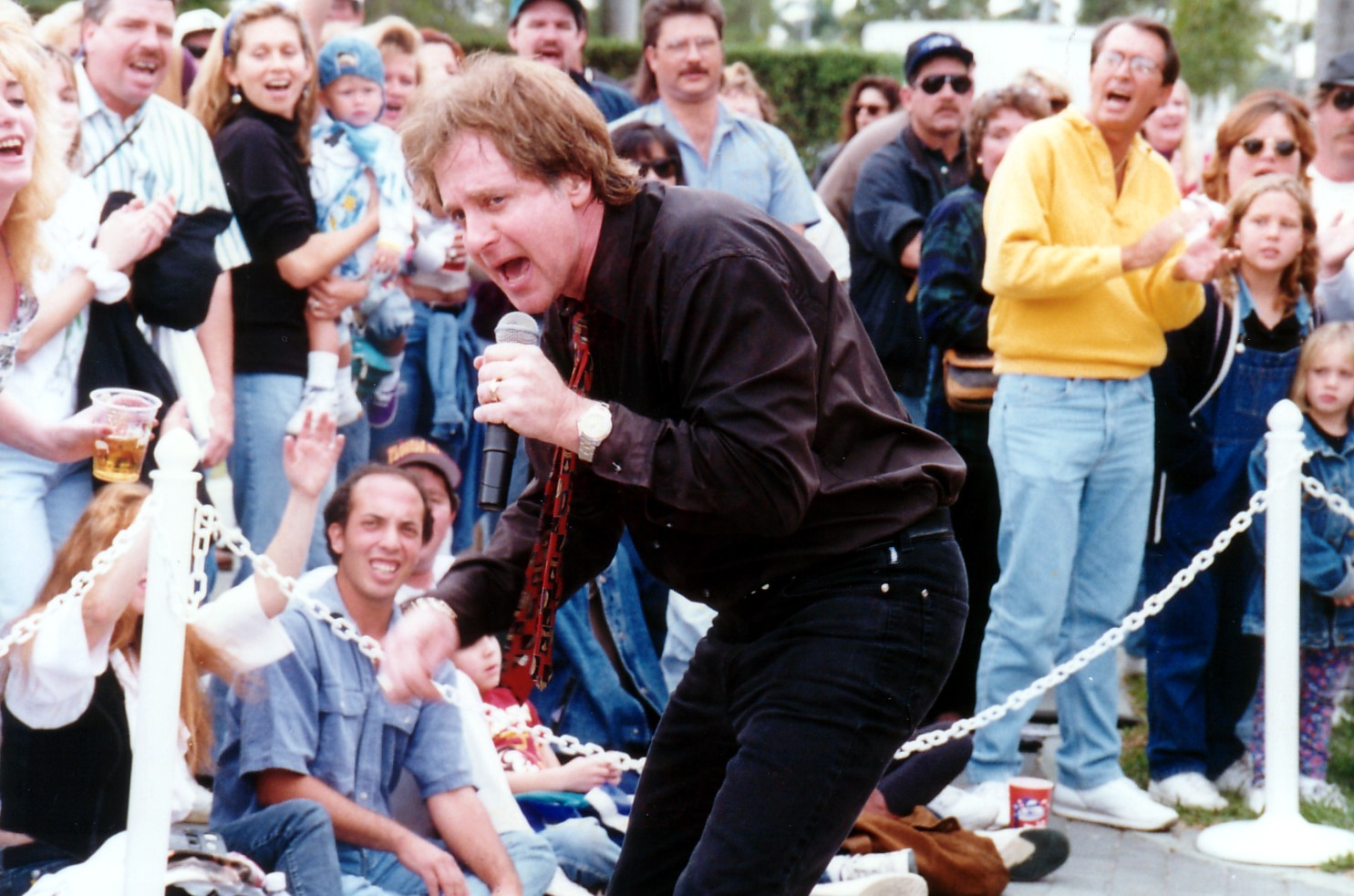
Money performing in Florida

Money wrote and performed original songs for the films Americathon (1979), Over the Top, Back to the Beach (both 1987), and Kuffs (1992), along with the television series Hardball (1989–1990).

In the three days following Money's death, fans streamed "Take Me Home Tonight" more than 3.1 million times, an increase of 349 percent compared to the previous three-day period. Fans also streamed his other songs by 931 percent more than the three previous days.

To mark the fifth anniversary of Money's death in September 2024, Money's wife, Laurie, released Money's final recording, "Stay with Me." "I knew that he'd talked about working on this song, but I didn't know that he'd completed his vocals on it, what the song was about, or even that it existed until nine months after he passed, when it was given to me by our friend who worked on it with him. Eddie never heard the finished song, but I know that he would've been very pleased with it and happy that it's finally being released," said Laurie.

=== Television, film, and radio career ===
Money made several screen appearances.

In 1997, he appeared in Wonderland, a documentary film about Levittown, New York, where Money attended high school. In the film, he said if he had "two tickets to paradise, I'd probably get back to Levittown."

Money played a fictionalized version of himself on a 1999 episode of season 5 of The Drew Carey Show. In the episode, he had been Mimi Bobeck's first husband early in his career, and they were long separated but never officially divorced. In May 2002, he played himself on an episode of the sitcom The King of Queens.

In October 2011, Money became the host of "Money in the Morning," a radio show on WSRV. The gig lasted about three months. He appeared in a 2012 GEICO insurance commercial in which he is depicted as a travel agency owner who sings "Two Tickets to Paradise" to a family that wants tickets for a vacation.

Soon after, Money partnered with Howard Perl Entertainment to produce special projects, including "Money for the Animals", a tour with MTV VJ Nina Blackwood designed to raise funds and adopt rescue animals in need.

In 2018, Money appeared in episode 6 of The Kominsky Method as a fictionalized version of himself who is indebted to the Internal Revenue Service and portrays the character Freddie Money in an eponymous tribute act at a casino to avoid further tax problems.

On April 8, 2018, Real Money, a reality television series about Money and his family, debuted on AXS TV. An episode sharing his cancer diagnosis aired on AXS TV the day before he died. The show's second season was expected to follow Money's "journey as he tells his family about the disease and undergoes treatment."

In late April 2018, Weekly Alibi's August March interviewed Money, who discussed his career, family, and new television show.

== Personal life and death ==
In November of 1980, after drinking alcohol, Money overdosed on either fentanyl or a synthetic barbiturate (accounts vary), mistaking the drug for cocaine. He suffered damage to the sciatic nerve on his left leg, was unable to walk for months, and had a permanent limp thereafter.

On Valentine's Day 1984 in Moraga, California, Money married Margo Lee Walker, a student from Los Angeles. Money and his bride tried to keep the wedding private, "but a crowd of screaming teenage fans showed up."

Money married Laurie Harris in 1989. They had five children: Zachary, Jesse (Jessica), Joseph, Julian, and Desmond. They were married for 30 years and had renewed their vows three months before his death.

In March 2000, Money purchased a home in Westlake Village, California, where he lived with his family. At one point in the early 2000s, Money also had a home in Island Estates, a gated community in Palm Coast, Florida, which he called "my place to play golf, be creative, go fishing, go surfing and have fun".

In 2001, Money joined a 12-step program to deal with his drinking and made a promise to his wife and children that he would change. In 2003, he reported that he was clean and sober.

Money developed pneumonia following a minimally invasive heart valve replacement surgery in July 2019, causing him to cancel tour dates. A cigarette smoker for decades, on August 24, 2019 he revealed that he had been diagnosed with stage 4 esophageal cancer; he died of complications from the cancer at Keck Hospital of USC in Los Angeles on September 13, 2019, at age 70. A year later, his family filed a lawsuit alleging wrongful death against the hospital, with an additional allegation of medical malpractice. The case was settled out of court in 2023.

== Discography ==
Studio albums

- Eddie Money (1977)
- Life for the Taking (1978)
- Playing for Keeps (1980)
- No Control (1982)
- Where's the Party? (1983)
- Can't Hold Back (1986)
- Nothing to Lose (1988)
- Right Here (1991)
- Love and Money (1995)
- Ready Eddie (1999)
- Wanna Go Back (2007)
