= Try Some, Buy Some =

1971 song by Ronnie Spector

Single by Ronnie Spector
- B-side: "Tandoori Chicken"
- Released: 16 April 1971
- Recorded: February–March 1971
- Studio: EMI and Trident, London
- Genre: Orchestral pop
- Length: 4:08
- Label: Apple
- Songwriter: George Harrison
- Producers: Phil Spector, George Harrison

Ronnie Spector singles chronology
"Why Don't They Let Us Fall in Love" (1964)	"Try Some, Buy Some" (1971)	"You'd Be Good For Me" (1975)

"Try Some, Buy Some" is a song written by the English rock musician George Harrison that was first released in April 1971 as a single by the American singer Ronnie Spector, formerly the lead vocalist of the Ronettes. She recorded it in London along with other Harrison compositions for a planned comeback album on the Beatles' Apple record label. The project was co-produced by Phil Spector, Ronnie's husband at the time, but abandoned following recording sessions that were hampered by his erratic behaviour. The only official release from the sessions, the single achieved minimal commercial success, peaking at number 77 on the US Billboard Hot 100 and number 63 on Canada's RPM Top 100. Harrison later added his own vocal onto a new mix of the instrumental track and included the song on his 1973 album Living in the Material World.

"Try Some, Buy Some" was one of several Harrison compositions left over from the sessions for his 1970 triple album All Things Must Pass, which Spector also co-produced. The song's austere melody was influenced by Harrison composing on a keyboard instrument rather than guitar. The lyrics document his sudden perception of God amid the temptations of the material world, including recreational drugs, and serve as an account of a religious epiphany. Ronnie later admitted to being confused by the concept, and some writers have commented on the song's unsuitability as a vehicle for her comeback. Spector employed his Wall of Sound production aesthetic to full effect on "Try Some, Buy Some" and was stunned at the single's commercial failure. The recording features a choir and long, lavishly orchestrated instrumental passages arranged by John Barham. The single's B-side was "Tandoori Chicken", a Harrison–Spector collaboration in the rockabilly style.

Several reviewers have questioned Harrison's decision to reuse the 1971 instrumental track for his version. Among the varied opinions on the Living in the Material World track, some focus on Harrison's struggle to sing in a higher key than he preferred and view its dense production as being out of place on the album; others admire the lyrics and melody, and recognise a seductive quality in the song. Having long been unavailable following its 1971 release, Ronnie Spector's version was reissued in 2010 on the compilation Come and Get It: The Best of Apple Records. A longtime admirer of the song, David Bowie covered "Try Some, Buy Some" on his 2003 album Reality and performed it on his tours in support of the album.

== Background and composition ==
George Harrison's song "Try Some, Buy Some" dates back to the recording sessions for his 1970 triple album All Things Must Pass, and was one of several tracks left over from that project. In his 1980 autobiography, I, Me, Mine, Harrison recalls writing the tune on an organ and, not being an accomplished keyboard player, having difficulties doing the correct fingering in both hands. It was only when his friend Klaus Voormann took over the left-hand part, to play the bass line, that he was able to hear the piece as he had imagined it.

The song itself, I think, is really good. It's so simple yet so complicated. It was the sort of thing I found myself playing over and over again and being amazed by the simplicity of the movement of the bass lines.

— George Harrison, 1972

Harrison biographer Simon Leng describes the tune as "the most extreme example" of its composer's "circular melodic" style, "seeming to snake through an unending series of harmonic steps". As reproduced in I, Me, Mine, Harrison's handwritten lyrics show the opening chord as E minor and the bass line descending through every semitone from E down to B, followed by a change to a B7 chord; the second part of the verse, beginning on an A minor chord, then follows a descending sequence that he writes as "A – A♭ – G – F♯ – E – A", before arriving at D major. (Note: On the released recording, Harrison transposed the key to a higher register (making the opening chord G minor), to suit Ronnie Spector's voice.) Harrison says in his autobiography that the melody and "weird chords" came about through experimentation on a keyboard instrument, which allowed him more harmonic possibilities than are available on a guitar. The song's time signature is a waltz-like 3/4 time, similar to the verses of his composition "I Me Mine", the last track recorded by the Beatles, in January 1970.

Former Melody Maker editor Richard Williams describes the lyrics of "Try Some, Buy Some" as "a typically Harrisonian hymn to his Lord", in keeping with the religiosity of All Things Must Pass tracks such as "My Sweet Lord", "Awaiting on You All" and "Hear Me Lord". Harrison biographer Elliot Huntley writes of "Try Some, Buy Some" delivering Harrison's Hindu-aligned devotional message "in television evangelist terms".

The song begins with the lines "Way back in time / Someone said try some, I tried some / Now buy some, I bought some ..." before Harrison states that he opened his eyes "and I saw you". According to Christian theologian Dale Allison, the lyrics are a "reflection on some sort of conversion experience", in which Harrison provides "before and after" comparisons. Before his spiritual awakening, Harrison sings of possessing, seeing, feeling and knowing nothing until, Allison writes, "he called upon God's love, which then came into him."

As in his later compositions "Simply Shady" and "Tired of Midnight Blue", Harrison refers to the drug culture prevalent in the music industry, in the verse-two lines "I've seen grey sky, met big fry / Seen them die to get high ..." Author Joshua Greene writes of Harrison's concern during the 1970s for friends who "wasted their time chasing sex and drugs and money", while Allison suggests John Lennon and Eric Clapton as being among the people on whom Harrison "personally witnessed the toll [that] drugs and drink took".

In addition to the song echoing the "lost and then found" message of many Christian conversions, Allison writes, "Try Some, Buy Some" demonstrates Harrison's incarnation among the "twice-born" in Bhagavad Gita terminology. The same theme of salvation through reconciliation with his deity is present in Harrison's 1968 song "Long, Long, Long" and would continue to feature throughout his solo career, in compositions such as "That Which I Have Lost" and "Heading for the Light".

== Planned Ronnie Spector solo album ==
=== Background ===
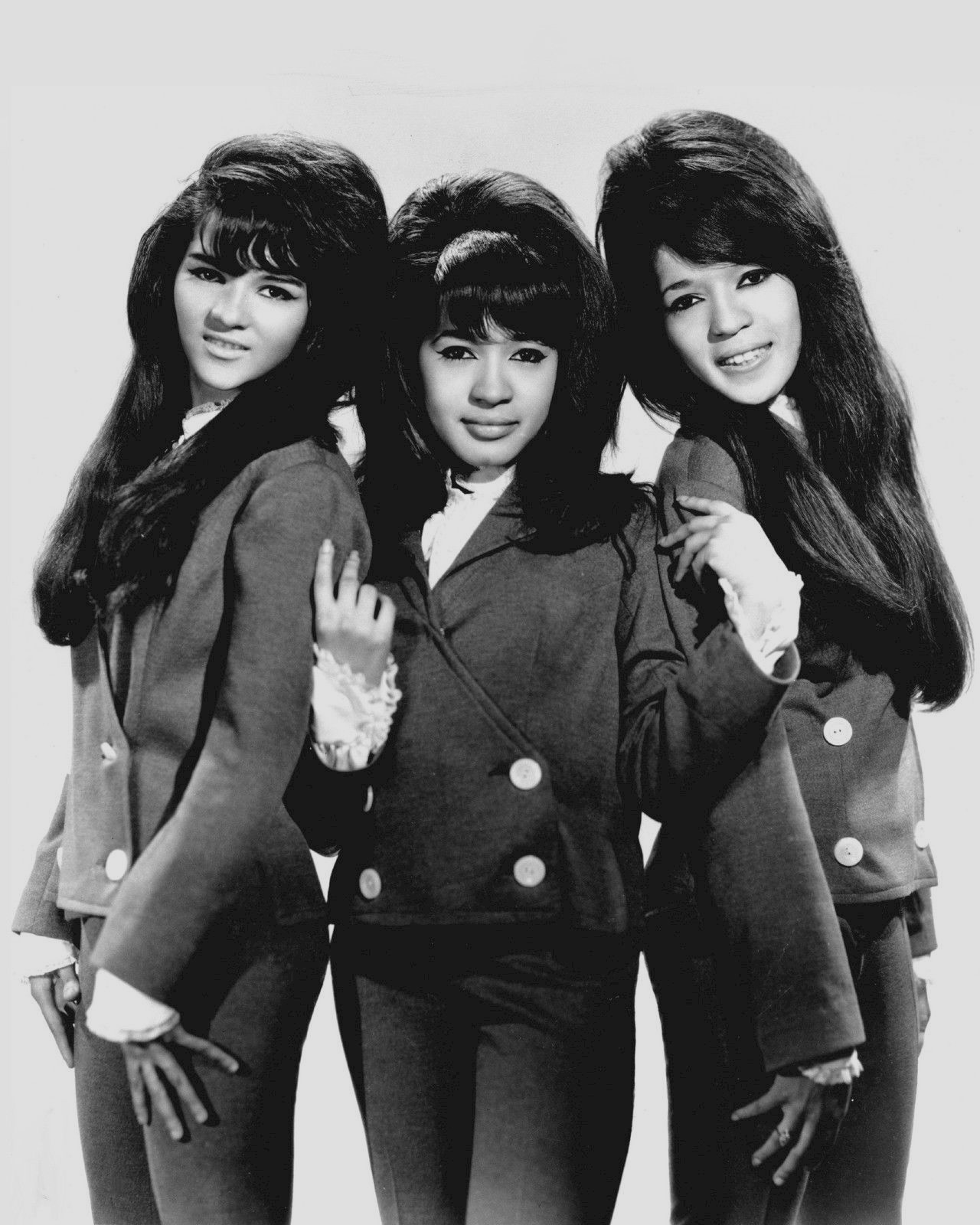
The Ronettes, with Ronnie Spector (centre), pictured in 1966

Following their successful partnership on All Things Must Pass in 1970, Harrison and co-producer Phil Spector turned their attention to resurrecting the career of Spector's wife Ronnie, formerly Veronica Bennett and lead singer of the Ronettes. Since the break-up of the Ronettes in 1967, her only musical release had been "You Came, You Saw, You Conquered", a 1969 single on A&M Records. Ronnie's signing to the Beatles' Apple record label was a condition of Spector's deal with the company, one that Harrison and Lennon, as avowed fans of the Ronettes, were happy to honour. According to former Beatles sound engineer Ken Scott, Spector first tried to record a song intended for her at Trident Studios in central London. This session took place in her absence, and before Harrison had begun the overdubbing phase of All Things Must Pass at Trident.

The plan was to produce a comeback album, with Harrison providing many of the songs, and issue it on Apple Records. In his book Phil Spector: Out of His Head, Williams quotes music publisher Paul Case as having said during this period: "Phil wants a hit record with Ronnie again more than anything in the world. I think he'd give up all his worldly possessions for that."

Speaking to Phil Symes of Disc and Music Echo in May 1971, Ronnie said she had hated being away from the music industry. The situation had been forced on her by Spector's semi-retirement in 1966, following the failure in America of Ike & Tina Turner's single "River Deep – Mountain High", a production he considered his masterpiece. Ronnie told Symes: "For four years Phil and I completely detached ourselves from everyone in the business and settled down in California. I was so bored and missed the stage so much I nearly had a nervous breakdown. If I hadn't had a kid I don't know what I would have done."

=== Main recording ===
Sessions for the proposed album took place in London in February 1971. Beatles historian Keith Badman gives dates of 2 and 3 February, while authors Chip Madinger and Mark Easter write that "according to reports", the sessions took place between 8 and 21 February. In addition to playing guitar, Harrison enlisted some of the musicians who had contributed to All Things Must Pass: Gary Wright, on keyboards; Derek and the Dominos drummer Jim Gordon; Voormann and Carl Radle (the latter another member of the Dominos), alternating on bass; and Badfinger's Pete Ham on second guitar and percussion. Another participant was Leon Russell, who had worked with Spector as a regular member of the Wrecking Crew during the mid 1960s. Badman writes that Lennon participated in the second session at EMI Studios (now Abbey Road Studios), on 3 February, allegedly playing piano. Ronnie was also at these sessions, having arrived in London the previous day with instructions to come to EMI and rehearse with Harrison, Russell and Ham.

Aside from "Try Some, Buy Some", the first songs selected were ones that Harrison had routined for All Things Must Pass but not used: "You" and "When Every Song Is Sung". The latter was originally titled "Whenever" and was intended for Shirley Bassey, and Harrison had written "You" as what he called "a Ronettes sort of song". The other tracks recorded were "Lovely La-De-Day" (or "Loverly Laddy Day"), written by Toni Wine, an associate of Spector; a Harrison–Spector collaboration titled "Tandoori Chicken"; and, according to Madinger and Easter, "I Love Him Like I Love My Very Life". In a 1987 interview with Musician magazine, Harrison spoke of Spector supplying songs for the project, one of which was "very good, in his pop vein".

"Tandoori Chicken" came about after Spector sent Beatles aide Mal Evans to get food during the session. Just over two minutes in length, the song is in the rockabilly style of Carl Perkins, with Spector playing blues piano and Harrison on overdubbed dobro. Harrison said the performance was recorded in a single take, with "a lot of improvised scat singing in the middle". Lennon was rumoured to have made an unspecified contribution on "Tandoori Chicken". (Note: According to author Dave Thompson, Lennon and his friends arrived uninvited, much to Spector's annoyance, and with Lennon declaring, "We're here to make a record with Ronnie Ronette." Thompson writes that, as simplistic as "Tandoori Chicken" is musically and lyrically, "it reasserted [Spector's] command in front of Lennon and his cronies; and re-established his cool at a time he almost lost it.")

The planned comeback album ended due to the same erratic behaviour from Spector that had hindered work on All Things Must Pass; in both instances, Madinger and Easter describe it as a "health"-related issue. According to Harrison in I, Me, Mine: "we only did four or five tracks before Phil fell over ..." (Note: Voormann recalls Spector falling over drunk at Apple Studio in 1970 and breaking his arm, which left Harrison to finish recording All Things Must Pass on his own. In his 1987 Musician interview, Harrison referred to Spector typically needing "eighteen cherry brandies" before he could start work each day.) Of those songs, Spector chose "Try Some, Buy Some" to complete for release as a single by Ronnie, rather than the more obviously commercial "You".

=== Vocal and orchestral overdubs ===
[Spector makes the strings and mandolins] sweep and soar in great blocks of sound, pirouetting around each other like a corps de ballet in slow motion. The closing portions of the orchestral arrangement are breathtaking, displaying a geometrical logic which makes use of suspended rhythms drawn out to screaming point.

— Journalist Richard Williams's description of Spector's production on "Try Some, Buy Some"

In Ronnie's recollection, when they were recording at EMI, Spector dismissed her concerns that the song's key was not right for her and that she did not understand its meaning. In response to her comments, Harrison removed some of the lyrics where the melody was too high. According to Scott, speaking at a 2013 Red Bull Music Academy event, Ronnie overdubbed her lead vocal at Trident. Scott recalled that Spector repeatedly kept her waiting in the small vocal booth between takes while he regaled Harrison and Scott with personal anecdotes lasting up to 20 minutes before commenting on her performance. In Scott's description, Ronnie waited in silence at the microphone each time, too frightened to speak. (Note: Scott added: "At the time it was so strange but then everything that came out about Phil after that, with the [Lana Clarkson murder] trial and everything, it just made so much sense.")

Williams highlights Spector's role in taking "a pleasant but essentially ordinary tune" and turning it into a "wholly magnificent" example of his Wall of Sound production style, on which "the essence is in the sound of the voice against the orchestra". The heavy orchestration – including string, brass and woodwind sections, mandolins and cymbals – together with the choral parts, were arranged by John Barham, Harrison's regular musical arranger during this period. (Note: According to Badman, it was during a March 1971 overdubbing session with Spector and "a huge orchestra" that Harrison learnt of Bright Tunes' legal action against him and Apple, over the "unauthorised plagiarism" of "He's So Fine" in his then-current international hit "My Sweet Lord". Bright Tunes' representatives served this notice on 10 March.)

=== Single release ===
Apple Records issued "Try Some, Buy Some" backed by "Tandoori Chicken" on 16 April 1971 in Britain (as Apple 33). The US release took place on 19 April (as Apple 1832). Ronnie gave several interviews to the UK music press to promote the single. She told Symes that it took a long time to learn and understand the song, adding: "I love the record. It's completely different for me; it's more of a music thing than vocal." (Note: Ronnie also said at the time: "I'm not in it very much ... it's like a movie where the star only appears now and then.")

Billboard magazine's reviewer described "Try Some, Buy Some" as a "powerful production ballad" that had "all the ingredients to break through big", while stating that Ringo Starr and Eric Clapton had contributed to the record. Cash Box said the "mere snatch of a song" was transformed into a "mighty four-minute track by virtue of an astounding production from Phil Spector and George Harrison", and that their achievement was then "sentimentally upstaged" by Ronnie reprising the wordless vocalisations of the Ronettes' "Be My Baby". Record World said that it is "lavishly produced" and described it as "hit stuff." In his contemporary review for The Times, Richard Williams deemed it "a monster piece of orchestral pop, the equal of almost anything Spector produced in his great period", but concluded: "sadly it will probably prove to be too 'weird' for today's market. Sometimes I'd swear that we're going backwards." Symes endorsed it in Disc and Music Echo as a "terrific first solo single".

"Try Some, Buy Some" failed to place on the UK Top 50. In the US, the song debuted on the Billboard Hot 100 on 8 May and reached number 77, remaining on the chart for four weeks. In Canada, it peaked at number 63 on the RPM Top 100. Williams writes of the reaction to "Try Some, Buy Some": "although people were awed by it, the radio would hardly touch it ..." In the UK, radio stations opted instead for "Tandoori Chicken", which author Bruce Spizer describes as having an "infectious party-style" quality. (Note: "Tandoori Chicken" was among the songs played during Lennon's 31st birthday jam session, with Phil Spector, Voormann and others, in New York City in October 1971.)

As with "River Deep – Mountain High", the single's lack of success was one of the "crushing disappointments" of Spector's career, author Nicholas Schaffner wrote in 1977, the producer having "[outdone] himself to transform it into a masterpiece of his patented 'wall of sound' production". Spector had been sure that the song would become "a giant smash", according to Williams, who describes the outcome as a challenge to "Phil's eternal trust in his own judgment of excellence".

Among other Spector biographers, Mark Ribowsky writes: "[The song] was completely wrong for her – another of George's mystic chants, it forced Ronnie to try to appeal to the spirit instead of the flesh ..." In his book Tearing Down the Wall of Sound, Mick Brown also comments on the unsuitability of Harrison's "hymn about rejecting materialism and embracing Krishna" and describes Ronnie's comeback as being "over before it had begun". By contrast, Dave Thompson, citing Ronnie's later recollections, says that she was "stunned" by the single's failure since Spector's "golden touch" had returned and "Try Some, Buy Some" was "as exquisite as anything he had cut with John and George".

=== Aftermath and reissue ===
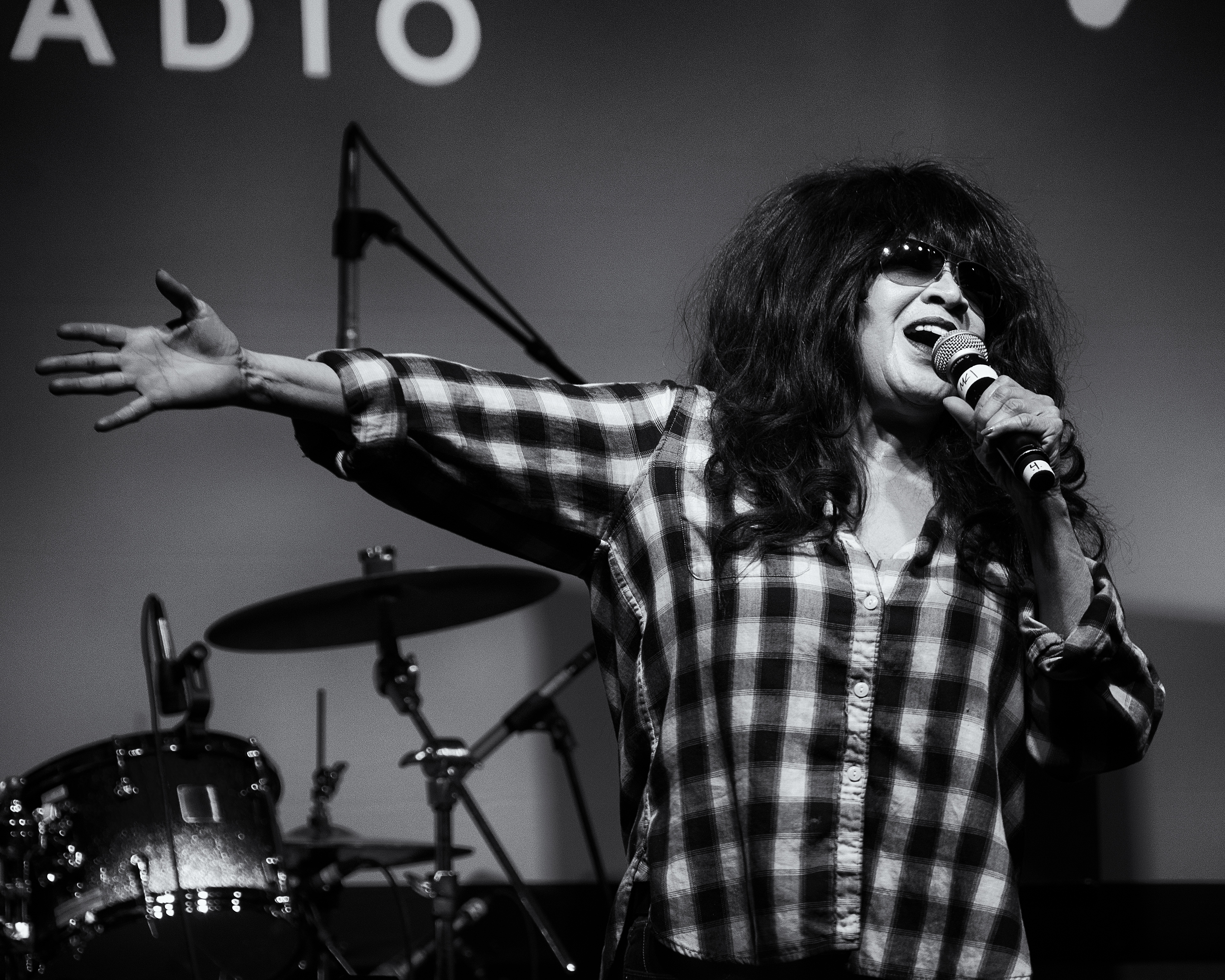
Ronnie performing at the 2014 Fest for Beatles Fans, four years after the song's reissue on the Apple Records compilation Come and Get It

"Try Some, Buy Some" remained out of print for almost 40 years, until its reissue on the 2010 Apple compilation Come and Get It: The Best of Apple Records. In the ensuing years, Ronnie filed for divorce in 1973 and resumed her career that year by playing live dates with a new line-up of the Ronettes and recording for Buddah Records.

In 1990, Ronnie wrote an autobiography, titled Be My Baby: How I Survived Mascara, Miniskirts, and Madness, in which she offers a damning description of her only Apple single. She says that "Try Some, Buy Some" "stunk" and its meaning was lost on her: "Religion? Drugs? Sex? I was mystified. And the more George sang, the more mystified I got." (Note: In light of this statement, Allison writes of the 1971 recording: "she didn't understand the song at all and sang it accordingly.") In 1999, however, she named the song among her five favourite recordings from her career, along with "Say Goodbye to Hollywood", "Take Me Home Tonight", the title track of her 1999 EP She Talks to Rainbows, and "Be My Baby". She added: "the record was done to make me happy, and it did. It might not have been made for the right reasons, but it's a good record."

Reviewing the Come and Get It compilation for BBC Music, Mike Diver comments on the overindulgence behind many of the Beatles' Apple projects but views "Try Some, Buy Some" as being "worthy of praise". Hal Horowitz of American Songwriter calls it a "corker 45" that helps make up for the "clunkers" on the album.

Of the other tracks recorded in 1971, "Tandoori Chicken" remains a rarity, while Ronnie's versions of "When Every Song Is Sung" and "You" have never received a release. A bootleg compilation known as The Harri-Spector Show includes "Lovely La-De-Day", as well as two instrumental versions of "You". The bootleg also includes a drunken jam session in which Harrison and Spector play snippets of cover versions on acoustic guitars, with occasional vocals by Ronnie. One of the recordings of "You" was the basic track that Harrison used when he completed the song for his 1975 album Extra Texture. (Note: Snippets of Ronnie's vocal remain on Harrison's recording of "You", including a closing quote from "Be My Baby".)

== George Harrison's version ==
"Try Some, Buy Some"

Song by George Harrison

from the album Living in the Material World
- Released: 30 May 1973
- Genre: Rock
- Length: 4:08
- Label: Apple
- Songwriter: George Harrison
- Producers: George Harrison, Phil Spector

Following the abandoned Ronnie Spector sessions in 1971, Harrison's relief effort for the refugees of the Bangladesh Liberation War kept his musical activities to a minimum for over a year. In an early 1972 interview, Harrison told music journalist Mike Hennessey that "Try Some, Buy Some" was one of his compositions he rated "really high" and that he might record it for his next album. He added that he could envisage including a soprano saxophone trill in the arrangement. After starting work on Living in the Material World in October that year, Harrison revisited Ronnie's recording of the song, rather than creating a new version, and replaced her vocal with his own. He later admitted that the key was higher than he would have preferred, as with "You".

Whereas the mix on the 1971 single had favoured instrumentation such as the mandolins, which Williams views as "the record's trademark", Harrison's treated the balance of backing instruments differently; Madinger and Easter describe the original version as having a "clearer" sound. Lennon later said that the descending melody played by the string section was an inspiration behind his 1974 song "#9 Dream". Before then, he had based the musical backing of his 1971 single "Happy Xmas (War Is Over)" (also co-produced by Spector) on that of "Try Some Buy Some", in particular, asking that his acoustic guitarists replicate the mandolin parts. Neither Russell nor Ham appeared in the musician credits for Harrison's version of "Try Some, Buy Some". (Note: Badfinger had recently signed with Warner Bros. Records, which the band would join in September 1973, on the expiry of their Apple contract.)

=== Release and reception ===
Apple released Living in the Material World in May 1973, with "Try Some, Buy Some" sequenced on side two of the original LP format. Reflecting the album content, Tom Wilkes's design for the record's face labels contrasted a devout spiritual existence with life in the material world, by featuring a painting of Krishna and his warrior prince Arjuna on side one and a picture of a Mercedes stretch limousine on the reverse. (Note: The side-two label image was a detail taken from Ken Marcus's inner gatefold photograph, which depicted Harrison and his fellow musicians at a Last Supper-style banquet.)

The inclusion of "Try Some, Buy Some" on Harrison's otherwise self-produced 1973 album surprised some critics. Writing in 1981, NME critic Bob Woffinden commented: "This was considered an underhand trick in some quarters. However, since the single had clearly not received the attention it merited, it could be argued that George was simply husbanding his resources carefully." In an otherwise highly favourable review for Material World, Stephen Holden of Rolling Stone called the song "an overblown attempt to restate the [album's] spiritual message in material terms: 'Won't you try some / Baby won't you buy some.'" In Melody Maker, Michael Watts wrote that the song fitted the album-wide description of Harrison's personal journey to "musical iconographer" status from his Beatle past. Watts considered the arrangement the "most imaginative" on Material World and described the recording as "a fairground sound, using harpsichord and couched in waltz-time".

=== Retrospective assessments ===
In his Harrison obituary for Rock's Backpages, in 2001, Mat Snow cited the track as an example of the "most compelling" aspect of Harrison's music – namely, when his songs "[dwell] in those strange shadows of elusive regret and longing, even fear". Five years after this, in an album review for Mojo magazine, Snow described "Try Some, Buy Some" as "an anti-heroin song so seductively melodic it might induce the opposite effect". Elliot Huntley praises Harrison's "yearning" vocal as "one of the many highlights" of Living in the Material World. Huntley considers the "hymn-like song cycle" represented by this "superb" track and the album's final two songs, "The Day the World Gets 'Round" and "That Is All", the equal of anything on All Things Must Pass.

Simon Leng dismisses the Ronnie Spector album project as "self-indulgence" on the part of the two producers and says that the inclusion of "Try Some, Buy Some" on Material World "achieved nothing, except to prove that Spector's Wall of Sound was an anachronism" by 1973. Leng bemoans Harrison's "straining" vocal on the track and "banks of trilling 'Long and Winding Road' mandolins" that are at odds with the more subtle mood found elsewhere on the album. Ian Inglis similarly finds the song "out of place" and says that the combination of Spector's "unconvincing" production style and Harrison's singing make it "one of his least impressive performances". Inglis also writes: "It may be a love song or a hymn of salvation but, unlike songs where this duality strengthens their impact (such as 'Isn't It a Pity'), here it sits uneasily between the two." (Note: According to Inglis, the song might have succeeded with a different musical arrangement and the "melodramatic delivery" of a singer like Shirley Bassey.)

Music critic Chris Ingham pairs "Try Some, Buy Some" with "Sue Me, Sue You Blues" as two "wry, reasonable digs at symptoms of what Harrison sees as symptoms of a diseased world". Reviewing the 2014 Apple Years Harrison reissues, for the Lexington Herald-Leader, Walter Tunis includes "Try Some, Buy Some" among the "stunners" on Material World and describes the song as an "achingly beautiful awakening anthem".

== David Bowie version ==
According to Huntley, "Try Some, Buy Some" was "an all-time favourite" of David Bowie. In Bowie's opinion, the song was "totally neglected". He originally intended to record it for a planned follow-up to Pin Ups, his 1973 collection of cover versions. Instead, he covered it on his 2003 album Reality, co-produced by his longtime collaborator Tony Visconti. Promoting the release in an interview with Paul Du Noyer of The Word, Bowie said that whereas Harrison had "a belief in some kind of system", his own experience continued to be a "daunting spiritual search". Bowie added:

Now my connection to the song is about leaving a way of life behind me and finding something new. It’s overstated about most rock artists leaving drugs ... But when I first heard the song in '74 I was yet to go through my heavy drug period. And now it’s about the consolation of having kicked all that and turning your life around.

Bowie occasionally performed "Try Some, Buy Some" live on his 2003–04 Reality Tour. In a review for the 2007 limited-edition box set David Bowie Box, critic Thom Jurek described Reality as a "schizophrenic recording", on which the covers of "Try Some, Buy Some" and the Modern Lovers song "Pablo Picasso" "[distinguish] this set more than anything else". Dave Thompson includes Bowie's version in his selection of the twenty "great Spector covers'.

== Personnel ==
- Ronnie Spector – vocals (1971 single)
- George Harrison – acoustic guitar; vocals (1973 release)
- Leon Russell – piano
- Gary Wright – electric piano
- Pete Ham – acoustic guitar
- Klaus Voormann – bass
- Jim Gordon – drums, tambourine
- John Barham – orchestral and choral arrangements
- Phil Spector – Producer

== Sources ==
- Dale C. Allison Jr, The Love There That's Sleeping: The Art and Spirituality of George Harrison, Continuum (New York, NY, 2006; ISBN 978-0-8264-1917-0).
- Keith Badman, The Beatles Diary Volume 2: After the Break-Up 1970–2001, Omnibus Press (London, 2001; ISBN 0-7119-8307-0).
- Mick Brown, Tearing Down the Wall of Sound: The Rise and Fall of Phil Spector, Vintage (New York, NY, 2008; ISBN 978-1-4000-7661-1).
- Harry Castleman & Walter J. Podrazik, All Together Now: The First Complete Beatles Discography 1961–1975, Ballantine Books (New York, NY, 1976; ISBN 0-345-25680-8).
- Alan Clayson, George Harrison, Sanctuary (London, 2003; ISBN 1-86074-489-3).
- Peter Doggett, You Never Give Me Your Money: The Beatles After the Breakup, It Books (New York, NY, 2011; ISBN 978-0-06-177418-8).
- Joshua M. Greene, Here Comes the Sun: The Spiritual and Musical Journey of George Harrison, John Wiley & Sons (Hoboken, NJ, 2006; ISBN 978-0-470-12780-3).
- George Harrison, I Me Mine, Chronicle Books (San Francisco, CA, 2002; ISBN 0-8118-3793-9).
- Elliot J. Huntley, Mystical One: George Harrison – After the Break-up of the Beatles, Guernica Editions (Toronto, ON, 2006; ISBN 1-55071-197-0).
- Chris Ingham, The Rough Guide to the Beatles, Rough Guides/Penguin (London, 2006; 2nd edn; ISBN 978-1-84836-525-4).
- Ian Inglis, The Words and Music of George Harrison, Praeger (Santa Barbara, CA, 2010; ISBN 978-0-313-37532-3).
- Simon Leng, While My Guitar Gently Weeps: The Music of George Harrison, Hal Leonard (Milwaukee, WI, 2006; ISBN 1-4234-0609-5).
- Ian MacDonald, Revolution in the Head: The Beatles' Records and the Sixties, Pimlico (London, 1998; ISBN 0-7126-6697-4).
- Chip Madinger & Mark Easter, Eight Arms to Hold You: The Solo Beatles Compendium, 44.1 Productions (Chesterfield, MO, 2000; ISBN 0-615-11724-4).
- Dan Matovina, Without You: The Tragic Story of Badfinger, Frances Glover Books (2000; ISBN 0-9657122-2-2).
- Andy Peebles, The Lennon Tapes: John Lennon and Yoko Ono in Conversation with Andy Peebles, 6 December 1980, BBC Publications (London, 1981; ISBN 0-563-17944-9).
- Mark Ribowsky, He's a Rebel: Phil Spector – Rock and Roll's Legendary Producer, Da Capo Press (Cambridge, MA, 2006; ISBN 978-0-306-81471-6).
- Robert Rodriguez, Fab Four FAQ 2.0: The Beatles' Solo Years, 1970–1980, Backbeat Books (Milwaukee, WI, 2010; ISBN 978-1-4165-9093-4).
- Patricia Romanowski & Holly George-Warren (eds), The New Rolling Stone Encyclopedia of Rock & Roll, Fireside/Rolling Stone Press (New York, NY, 1995; ISBN 0-684-81044-1).
- Nicholas Schaffner, The Beatles Forever, McGraw-Hill (New York, NY, 1978; ISBN 0-07-055087-5).
- Ronnie Spector with Vince Waldron, Be My Baby: How I Survived Mascara, Miniskirts, and Madness – Or, My Life as a Fabulous Ronette, HarperPerennial (New York, NY, 1990; ISBN 978-0-06-097423-7).
- Mark Spitz, Bowie: A Biography, Three Rivers Press (New York, NY, 2009; ISBN 978-0-307-71699-6).
- Bruce Spizer, The Beatles Solo on Apple Records, 498 Productions (New Orleans, LA, 2005; ISBN 0-9662649-5-9).
- Dave Thompson, Wall of Pain: The Biography of Phil Spector, Sanctuary (London, 2004; ISBN 978-1-86074-543-0).
- Gary Tillery, Working Class Mystic: A Spiritual Biography of George Harrison, Quest Books (Wheaton, IL, 2011; ISBN 978-0-8356-0900-5).
- Richard Williams, Phil Spector: Out of His Head, Omnibus Press (London, 2003; ISBN 978-0-7119-9864-3).
- Bob Woffinden, The Beatles Apart, Proteus (London, 1981; ISBN 0-906071-89-5).
