= The Hand That Rocks the Cradle =

The Hand That Rocks the Cradle may refer to:

== Literature ==
- "The Hand That Rocks the Cradle" (poem), 1865, by William Ross Wallace

== Film and television ==
- The Hand That Rocks the Cradle (1917 film), a 1917 silent film
- The Hand That Rocks the Cradle (1992 film), a 1992 thriller starring Annabella Sciorra and Rebecca De Mornay
- The Hand That Rocks the Cradle (2025 film)
- "The Hand That Rocks the Cradle" (Doctors), a 2005 television episode

== Music ==
- "The Hand That Rocks the Cradle" (song), 1987, by Glen Campbell and Steve Wariner
- "The Hand That Rocks the Cradle", a song by The Smiths from The Smiths
- "The Hand That Rocks the Cradle", a song by Black Sabbath from Cross Purposes
