= The Hand That Rocks the Cradle (2025 soundtrack) =

The Hand that Rocks the Cradle (Original Soundtrack)

Film score by Ariel Marx
- Released: October 22, 2025
- Recorded: 2025
- Genre: Film score
- Length: 34:06
- Label: Hollywood
- Producer: Ariel Marx

Ariel Marx chronology
Wisdom of Happiness (2025)	The Hand that Rocks the Cradle (2025)	The White House Effect (2025)

The Hand that Rocks the Cradle (Original Soundtrack) is the film score composed by Ariel Marx to the 2025 film The Hand That Rocks the Cradle, which was a remake of the 1992 film of the same name. The film is directed by Michelle Garza Cervera and stars Mary Elizabeth Winstead, Maika Monroe, Raúl Castillo and Martin Starr. The soundtrack was released through Hollywood Records on October 22, 2025.

== Background ==
According to Cervara, when Ariel Marx began scoring for the film, she gave birth to a baby, taking a break from her work-related commitments to nurse the child. When she turned a year old, she utilized the breast pumps and toys for the baby as instruments for the score. Cervara recalled that the sounds where built from the actual objects her character around her, as she worked in a specific and emotional place and did not go stereotypical or classic, but provide what the story and characters' needs and allows the characters to have read and have silence instead of overdoing it. The incorporation of punk music throughout the score had been utilized to blend well with eerie elements, while also helping the editing pattern.

== Release ==
The soundtrack was released through Hollywood Records on October 22, 2025.

== Reception ==
Zachary Lee of RogerEbert.com wrote that Ariel Marx's "nightmarish and stressful songs feel like they’re being sung by an entity that’s out of breath in its struggle to break free from the confines of the film itself" while also adding Marx's involvement in films such as Shiva Baby (2020) and Sanctuary (2022) proves that she is in "a familiar, tense register". He also added the best moments were her work "overlays scenes of domestic tranquility, creating a dissonance that highlights the latent violence about to befall the characters". David Ehrlich of IndieWire wrote Marx's score had a "gasping breathiness". William Bibbiani of TheWrap wrote Calling it an "incredible score" added, "Marx keeps our anxiety cranked, even when the events on-screen don’t match her music’s panicky intensity". David Rooney of The Hollywood Reporter considered the score to be "eerie".

== Track listing ==
No.	Title	Length
1.	"Fire"	1:29
2.	"My Favorite Psycho"	1:58
3.	"Lullaby"	1:27
4.	"Moving In"	1:57
5.	"DNA Test"	1:43
6.	"Running Thoughts"	1:19
7.	"Please Stay"	1:00
8.	"Cupcakes"	1:10
9.	"I Think We Should Talk"	1:39
10.	"Weird Reaction"	2:29
11.	"Something Feels Off"	3:28
12.	"I Saw You"	2:18
13.	"You Made Me Do This"	1:47
14.	"Tight Muscles"	1:33
15.	"Restraining Order"	1:25
16.	"House Visit"	2:19
17.	"What You're Doing"	1:47
18.	"Get Out"	2:11
19.	"Out of a Can, Like a Cat"	1:07
Total length:		34:06

== Additional music ==
The following songs are not included in the soundtrack:

- "She Talks to Rainbows" by Ronnie Spector
- "Push the Sky Away" by Nick Cave and the Bad Seeds
- "Happy Birthday to You" by Cast
- "I'll Be Your Mirror" by the Velvet Underground
- "After Sunset (NYE)" by Band Aparte
- "The Innocents" by Low
- "La Piñata" by Traditional

== Accolades ==
Award	Date of ceremony	Category	Recipient(s) and nominee(s)	Result	Ref.
Motion Picture Sound Editors	March 8, 2026	Outstanding Achievement in Music Editing – Broadcast Long Form	Erica Weiss (supervising music editor)	Nominated	
