= Unfinished Business (Ronnie Spector album) =

Studio album by Ronnie Spector
- Released: May 1987
- Labels: CBS; Columbia
- Producers: Michael Young (tracks 1, 3–5); Desmond Child (track 2); Gary Klein (tracks 6–10)

Ronnie Spector chronology
Siren (1980)	Unfinished Business (1987)	She Talks to Rainbows (1999)

Unfinished Business is the second studio album by American singer Ronnie Spector, released in 1987.

Two singles were released from the album; "Who Can Sleep" in April 1987 (featuring Eddie Money as a guest vocalist) and "Love on a Rooftop", released in August 1987. A music video for "Who Can Sleep" was directed by David Hogan and produced by Amanda Temple for Limelight Productions. It achieved medium rotation on MTV.

== Background ==
In 1986, Spector saw a resurgence in her music career after providing vocals on Eddie Money's Top 5 Billboard Hot 100 hit "Take Me Home Tonight". In the wake of the song's success, Columbia Records offered Spector a contract to record a solo album, which became Unfinished Business. In her 1990 memoir Be My Baby, Spector recalled the offer as "like the dream of a lifetime come true". However, the album was not a commercial success, with Spector recalling: "I could tell within two weeks [of the album's release] that it was a flop. I know the excitement that happens when you've got a hit - the telephone rings off the hook, and everybody wants a piece of you. But none of that was happening."

== Critical reception ==
Professional ratings
Review scores
Source	Rating
AllMusic	2/5 stars

Upon release, Billboard commented: "Former Ronette's voice is an American classic, and she puts it to good use on this nice update of the Spector sound." They praised Susanna Hoffs' backing vocals on "Dangerous", noting how she "complements Spector expertly" on the track. Cash Box listed the album as one of their "feature picks" during May 1987 and commented: "More than a few cleverly placed Ronettes touches gives the LP its charm".

== Track listing ==
No.	Title	Writer(s)	Length
1.	"Who Can Sleep"	Alan Gordon, Jerry Friedman	4:10
2.	"Love on a Rooftop"	Desmond Child, Diane Warren	5:00
3.	"Dangerous"	Billy Steinberg, Tom Kelly	3:31
4.	"Burnin' Love"	Dennis Linde	3:41
5.	"Unfinished Business"	Gregory Abbott	4:07
6.	"(If I Could) Walk Away"	Don Dixon	4:07
7.	"Heart Song"	Douglas Berlent	4:24
8.	"True to You"	Gerard McMann	4:00
9.	"When We Danced"	David Palmer, Philip Jost	2:53
10.	"Good Love Is Hard to Find"	Gordon	3:02

== Personnel ==
- Ronnie Spector – vocals
- Eddie Money – additional vocals (track 1)
- Bob Christianson, Pepy Castro – backing vocals (tracks 1, 4–5)
- Doug Worthington – guitar (tracks 1, 3–4)
- Danny Lewis – keyboards (tracks 1, 3–5), backing vocals (track 1), trumpet (track 4)
- Kenny Aaronson – bass (track 1)
- David Prader – drums (track 1)
- Desmond Child and Rouge (Diana Graselli, Miriam Valle, Maria Vidal) – backing vocals, backing vocal arrangement (track 2)
- Bruce Kulick – guitar (track 2)
- Seth Glassman – bass (track 2)
- Jerry Marotta – drums (track 2)
- Robert Stern – saxophone (track 2)
- Gregg Mangiafico – keyboards (track 2)
- Susanna Hoffs – backing vocals (track 3)
- Jimmy Vivino – guitar (track 3)
- Peter Scherer – Synclavier (tracks 3–4), Synclavier programming (track 5)
- Kasim Sulton – tambourine, wind chimes (track 3)
- Thommy Price – drums (track 3)
- Margaret Dorn – backing vocals (tracks 4–5)
- Rick De Pofi – saxophone (track 4)
- Larry Sarello – trombone (track 4)
- Ada Dyer – backing vocals (tracks 6, 8)
- Deva Gray, Janie Barnet – backing vocals (tracks 6–10)
- Kenny White – piano (tracks 6, 8)
- Paul Shaffer – organ (tracks 6–7), piano (tracks 9–10), arranger (tracks 9–10), Hammond organ (track 10)
- Douglas Berlent – synthesizer (tracks 6–10), synthesizer programming (tracks 6–8, 10), synthesizer arrangement (tracks 6–8, 10), production assistant coordinator (tracks 6–10), piano (track 7), arrangement (track 7)
- Will Lee – bass (tracks 6–10)
- Michael Dawe – drums (tracks 6, 8)
- Lonie Groves – backing vocals (tracks 7, 10)
- Russ Palamino – tenor saxophone (tracks 7, 10), alto saxophone (track 9)
- Anton Fig – drums (tracks 7, 9–10)
- Tommy Rotella – guitar (track 8)
- Janice Pendarvis – backing vocals (track 9)

Production

- Chris Floberg – assistant engineer (track 1), assistant mixer (track 10)
- Jim Grove, Mario Rodriguez – assistant engineers (track 1)
- Michael Young – producer (tracks 1, 3–5), engineer (tracks 1, 3–5), arrangement (tracks 1, 3–5), mixing (tracks 3–5, 10)
- Stephen Rosen – coordinator (tracks 1–5)
- Frank Filipetti – mixing (track 2)
- Arthur Payson – engineer (track 2)
- Mike Morgan – assistant engineer (track 2)
- Ralph Schuckett – arrangement (track 2)
- Desmond Child – producer (track 2), arrangement (track 2)
- Roy Hendrickson – assistant engineer (track 3)
- John Hegedes – mixing (track 3)
- Chris Floberg – assistant engineer (track 4)
- Gary Klein – producer (tracks 6–10)
- Mark Gadie – remix (tracks 6, 8–9), mixing (track 7)
- John Davenport – engineer (tracks 6–10)
- Tim Lightner – assistant engineer (tracks 6–7, 9)
- David Wolfert – rhythm arrangement (track 6)
- Craig Vogel – assistant engineer (tracks 8, 10)
- George Marino – mastering

Other

- Stacy Drummond – art direction
- Sante D'Orazio – photography
- David Cameron – back cover photography
- Charles Koppelman, Don Rubin – executive producers
- Janet Oseroff, Jonathan Greenfield – management
