= The Hand That Rocks the Cradle (1992 film) =

1992 film by Curtis Hanson

- Theatrical release poster
- Directed by: Curtis Hanson
- Written by: Amanda Silver
- Produced by: David Madden
- Starring: Annabella Sciorra; Rebecca De Mornay; Matt McCoy; Ernie Hudson
- Cinematography: Robert Elswit
- Edited by: John F. Link
- Music by: Graeme Revell
- Production companies: Hollywood Pictures; Interscope Communications; Nomura Babcock & Brown
- Distributed by: Buena Vista Pictures Distribution
- Release date: January 10, 1992
- Running time: 110 minutes
- Country: United States
- Language: English
- Budget: $11.9 million
- Box office: $140 million

The Hand That Rocks the Cradle is a 1992 American psychological thriller film directed by Curtis Hanson, written by Amanda Silver, and starring Annabella Sciorra, Rebecca De Mornay, Matt McCoy, Ernie Hudson, Julianne Moore, and Madeline Zima. The plot follows the pregnant wife of a Seattle obstetrician, who dies by suicide after he is accused of sexual misconduct by some of his patients. The shock leads the wife to miscarry, after which she poses as a nanny for one of her late husband's accusers and slowly begins to infiltrate the family. The film's title is taken from the 1865 poem by William Ross Wallace, and it features several musical pieces drawn from the 1879 comic opera The Pirates of Penzance.

The Hand That Rocks the Cradle had a sneak preview for over 100 theaters on December 31, 1991, and was theatrically released in the United States on January 10, 1992, by Buena Vista Pictures through its Hollywood Pictures label. The film was a box office success, grossing approximately US$140 million worldwide against a budget of $11.9 million, subsequently becoming one of the year's most profitable films. In the home video market, it became the top rental in July 1992, and was the seventh-most rented film of 1992 in the United States. The film received numerous accolades, including Saturn Award nominations for Best Horror Film, Best Actress (De Mornay), and Best Supporting Actress (Moore).

The Hand That Rocks the Cradle was remade as the Bollywood film Khal-Naaikaa (1993), and later adapted into another American film (2025).

== Plot ==
Claire Bartel, a Seattle housewife pregnant with her second child, is sexually assaulted by her new obstetrician, Dr. Victor Mott, during a routine check-up. Her husband Michael encourages her to report Dr. Mott to the state medical board, which results in other women coming forward with accusations. After a news telecast reports these accusations, Dr. Mott dies by suicide to avoid arrest. His pregnant widow is informed that his life insurance has been voided due to his suicide. Additionally, his assets have been frozen because of numerous lawsuits, leaving her penniless and forcing the sale of her lavish home. Traumatized, Mrs. Mott goes into pre-term labor and suffers a miscarriage that necessitates an emergency hysterectomy. While recovering, she sees a news story identifying Claire as the first woman who came forward with allegations against her husband.

Six months later, Claire has given birth to her son, Joey, and is in the midst of building her own personal greenhouse with the help of an intellectually disabled handyman named Solomon, who has bonded with their young daughter Emma. While searching for a nanny, Mrs. Mott, under the alias Peyton Flanders, introduces herself and is hired.

Once inside the house, Peyton begins taking revenge on the Bartels by degrees. She frequently breastfeeds Joey in secret, causing him to reject Claire's milk, manipulates Emma into keeping secrets from Claire, and surreptitiously destroys Michael's workplace proposal. After Solomon discovers Peyton breastfeeding Joey, she places a pair of Emma's underwear in his toolbox, resulting in Claire firing him, believing he is a pedophile preying on Emma; Solomon's firing causes Emma to turn against her mother. Despite being fired, Solomon continues to return to the home secretly to watch over the family.

Peyton arranges a surprise birthday party for Claire, inviting Marlene, a real estate agent and former girlfriend of Michael's. She steals Marlene's cigarette lighter and places it in Michael's coat pocket. On the day of the party, Claire finds the lighter and vocally and vulgarly accuses Michael of having an affair with Marlene, only to find her and the partygoers in the next room. Marlene leaves hurt and humiliated.

Saddened by these events, Claire begins to grow increasingly suspicious of Peyton, and suggests the family take a vacation without her. Peyton overhears this conversation, and boobytraps the greenhouse, hoping to kill Claire. Meanwhile, Marlene discovers Peyton's true identity via a real estate listing of the Motts' residence. Marlene arrives at the Bartels' home, where Mrs. Mott lures her into the greenhouse and sets off her trap, collapsing the glass ceiling and killing her. Afterward, Peyton empties all of Claire's inhalers, then leaves the house with Joey. Claire returns and, upon discovering Marlene's body, has an asthma attack. With her inhalers emptied, she barely manages to call 9-1-1 before collapsing, resulting in her being hospitalized.

Michael is distraught at Claire's hospitalization and Marlene's death, but manages to resist Peyton when she attempts to seduce him. After Claire is discharged, she visits Marlene's office and also uncovers the truth about Peyton. Enraged, Claire returns home and punches Peyton in the face before revealing the truth to Michael. The Bartels immediately fire her, and fearing for their safety, they plan to spend the night in a hotel.

As the Bartels prepare to leave, Peyton breaks into the home and attacks Michael with a shovel, pushing him down the basement stairs and breaking his legs. She then attempts to fulfill her true goal: taking Emma and Joey for herself. After witnessing Peyton attack Claire, Emma turns against her and locks her in the upstairs nursery. She escapes and finds Solomon in the attic, aiding in the children's escape. Peyton attempts to kill Claire, apparently triggering another asthma attack, but Claire, having faked the attack, lunges at Peyton when Solomon momentarily distracts her. Claire pushes Peyton out the attic window, fatally impaling her on the picket fence below. Touched at how Solomon risked his life to protect her family, Claire welcomes him back, and they all leave the attic to help Michael as the police and paramedics arrive.

== Cast ==
- Annabella Sciorra as Claire Bartel
- Rebecca De Mornay as Mrs. Mott
- Matt McCoy as Michael Bartel
- Ernie Hudson as Solomon
- Julianne Moore as Marlene Craven
- Madeline Zima as Emma Bartel
- John de Lancie as Dr. Victor Mott
- Kevin Skousen as Marty Craven
- Eric, Jennifer, and Ashley Melander as Baby Joey

== Production ==
=== Development ===
The Hand That Rocks the Cradle originated as Amanda Silver's film school thesis. Silver completed approximately thirty drafts of the screenplay over a two-year period. Commenting on her inspiration, she said: "I was fascinated with [the idea of] what happens when people give their trust over to someone who's out to destroy them." The film takes its title from the 1865 poem by William Ross Wallace.

In August 1990, it was reported Interscope Communications was preparing the film for Hollywood Pictures. By October 1990 Curtis Hanson was hired to direct. The setting and location was originally meant to be in Atlanta, Georgia, but was changed to the Seattle metropolitan area.

=== Casting ===
Rebecca De Mornay read the screenplay for the film and sought to play the role of Peyton, as she was "haunted" by the story. De Mornay commented that the producers considered her for the project because "they wanted someone who is likable" and the part was against type for the roles she had become known for.

=== Filming ===
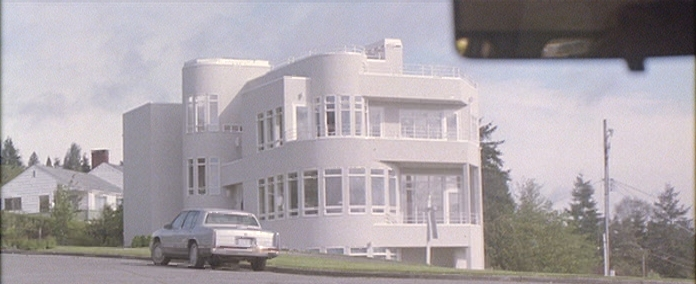
House of Dr. Mott, located in Seattle

Principal photography of The Hand That Rocks the Cradle began on April 15, 1991, after being rescheduled from February 22. The film shoot was delayed due to the casting of the female leads. The film was shot on location in Washington state in Issaquah, Seattle, and Tacoma.

The Motts' residence is located at 2502 37th Avenue West in Seattle, and the Bartels' residence at 808 North Yakima Avenue in Tacoma.

== Release ==
The Hand That Rocks the Cradle had a sneak preview for over 100 theaters across the United States and Canada on December 31, 1991. Due to the enthusiastic audience response to the advanced screening Disney held another sneak preview for a larger amount of theaters on January 4, 1992. The film had its nationwide theatrical premiere on January 10, 1992.

=== Home media ===
The Hand That Rocks the Cradle was released on VHS on July 8, 1992, on DVD on December 8, 1998, with the original theatrical trailer as the sole special feature. On September 4, 2012 Disney/Buena Vista released the film on Blu-ray disc with the same theatrical trailer as the previous releases. The film was presented in its original widescreen aspect ratio, approximately 1.85:1.

== Reception ==
=== Box office ===
The Hand That Rocks the Cradle grossed $7.7 million during its opening weekend, ranking number one at the U.S. box office over Hook, which had held the number one spot for four weeks. It remained the number one film at the U.S. box office for four consecutive weeks, then was upended by Medicine Man, which was also released by Hollywood Pictures. By the end of its run, the film earned a total of $88 million in the United States and Canada and $52 million internationally, for a worldwide total of $140 million.

=== Critical response ===
On Rotten Tomatoes, 67% of 54 reviews are positive. The consensus summarizes: "Thanks largely to Rebecca De Mornay's delightfully villainous turn in the central role, The Hand That Rocks the Cradle is an entertaining—albeit rather silly—domestic thriller." On Metacritic, the film has a score of 64 out of 100, based on reviews from 26 critics. Audiences polled by CinemaScore gave the film an average grade of "A−" on an A+ to F scale.

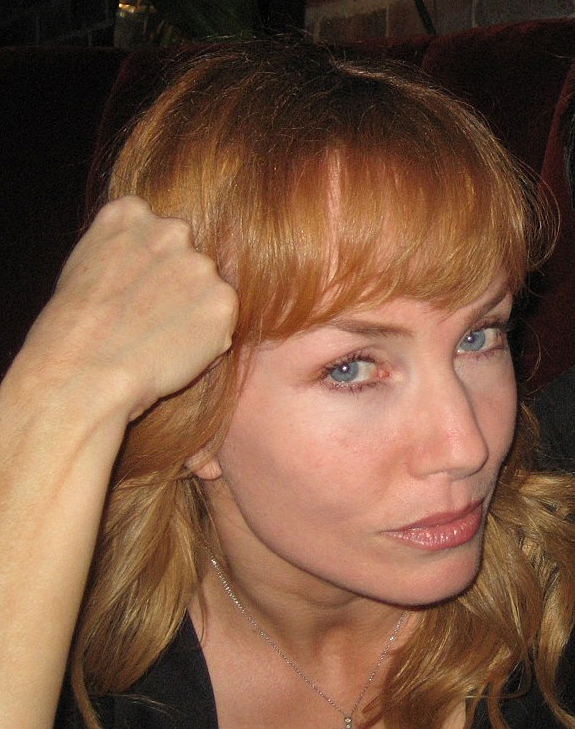
De Mornay was praised for her performance

Gene Siskel stated that he "had trouble accepting the premise of this picture because of the casual way in which the nanny is hired in an early scene by the mother," citing that the premise is unrealistic. However, he gave praise to Julianne Moore's character, saying, "Much more believable is the supporting character of the mother's best friend" and that "the friend is a terrific character, it's too bad she doesn't have more scenes in the picture." He mentioned that his "biggest objection to The Hand That Rocks the Cradle is to its scenes with the children in jeopardy or psychic pain." Siskel finally remarked that "there are some fun thrills in The Hand That Rocks the Cradle to be sure, but I found a lot of it distasteful, too." Roger Ebert had a higher opinion of the film, stating that he "found this film worked" and that "It touches on a fear and that's why it appeals to us." Ebert praised De Mornay's performance in the film, saying, "She does, I think, a very good job, a very, very sound job of being the villainess in this film and I think it's an effective performance", a statement which Siskel agreed with, and that he found the scenes of the children "very interesting because I saw them as a portrait of the evil of that woman."

Vincent Canby of The New York Times said of the film that "The Hand That Rocks the Cradle is meant to scare audiences more or less in the way that the patrons of the early nickelodeons were frightened when they saw the image of a train rushing at them. Audiences aren't asked to think, only to react" and that "The Hand That Rocks the Cradle proves again that not thinking isn't especially easy even today. Though Mr. Hanson is a slick movie maker, he is not an especially persuasive one here. Don't be gulled by those who would compare The Hand That Rocks the Cradle to Fatal Attraction, which features three strong characters who, in one way or another, are ready to answer for their actions." He added that "Mr. Hanson creates the occasionally effective shock effect to satisfy those who want to squeal in mock fright. More often the devices he uses are such tired tricks as the crosscutting between two sets of simultaneous, often innocent, actions to create the illusion of suspense that can't be sustained." Rebecca Hawkes of The Daily Telegraph gave the film a rating a 3 stars out of 5 and said that "It's a tense, viscerally unsettling moment, that helps make the film into something more than just a fun, formulaic thriller", while Sue Heal of The Radio Times rated the film 4 stars out of 5, stating that "This is pure unbridled hokum, of course, but extremely effective until the last 30 minutes, when the plot rapidly self-destructs."

In 2006, the film was included in Bravo's special 30 Even Scarier Movie Moments, placing at #24.

Dread Central reported that, in the years since the film's original release, it has garnered a cult following.

=== Criticism from feminists ===
The Hand That Rocks the Cradle received criticism from some feminists for its depiction of sexual assault and of violence between women. The Washington Post reviewer Rita Kempley criticized the film, arguing that it is anti-feminist. De Mornay challenged these accusations, saying: "This is a compelling story, and a compelling thriller... We have a lack of women writers and a lack of good roles for women. Because of this shortage, there's the belief in some circles that when women are portrayed in the film, they must always be portrayed as wonderful human beings. This is a kind of minority thinking I don't like. It's counterproductive."

=== Accolades ===
Award/association	Year	Category	Recipient(s) and nominee(s)	Result	Ref.
ASCAP Film and Television Music Awards	1993	Top Box Office Film	Graeme Revell	Won	
Chicago Film Critics Association Awards	1992	Best Actress	Rebecca De Mornay	Nominated	
Cognac Festival du Film Policier	1992	Best Actress	Rebecca De Mornay	Won	
Cognac Festival du Film Policier	1992	Grand Prix Award	Curtis Hanson	Won	
Cognac Festival du Film Policier	1992	Audience Award	Curtis Hanson	Won	
MTV Movie Awards	1992	Best Villain	Rebecca De Mornay	Won	
MTV Movie Awards	1992	Best Female Performance	Rebecca De Mornay	Nominated	
Saturn Awards	1993	Best Horror Film	The Hand That Rocks the Cradle	Nominated	
Saturn Awards	1993	Best Actress	Rebecca De Mornay	Nominated	
Saturn Awards	1993	Best Supporting Actress	Julianne Moore	Nominated	
Young Artist Awards	1993	Best Young Actress Under 10 in a Motion Picture	Madeline Zima	Nominated	

== Remakes ==
The film was remade as Khal-Naaikaa, which was released on August 6, 1993. Kavya's Diary, a film heavily inspired from this is released on June 5, 2009.

Supernatural writer Daniel Loflin was set to executive produce and write an adaptation for ABC Family in 2014, alongside Ted Field, a producer on the original film, but it did not move forward.

On September 26, 2024, it was announced that a new remake was in development with Walt Disney Studios Motion Pictures under 20th Century Studios, starring Maika Monroe with Michelle Garza Cervera directing and Micah Bloomberg writing the script. The film was released directly to streaming on Hulu on October 22, 2025.

== See also ==
- List of films featuring home invasions
- List of films featuring psychopaths and sociopaths
- List of mental disorders in film

== Sources ==
- Bergman, Jill (2012). The Motherless Child in the Novels of Pauline Hopkins. Baton Rouge, Louisiana: Louisiana State University Press. ISBN 978-0-807-14729-0.
- Lister, Linda (2018). So You Want to Sing Light Opera: A Guide for Performers. New York City, New York: Bloomsbury. ISBN 978-1-442-26939-2.
