= Ronnie Spector =

American singer (1943–2022)

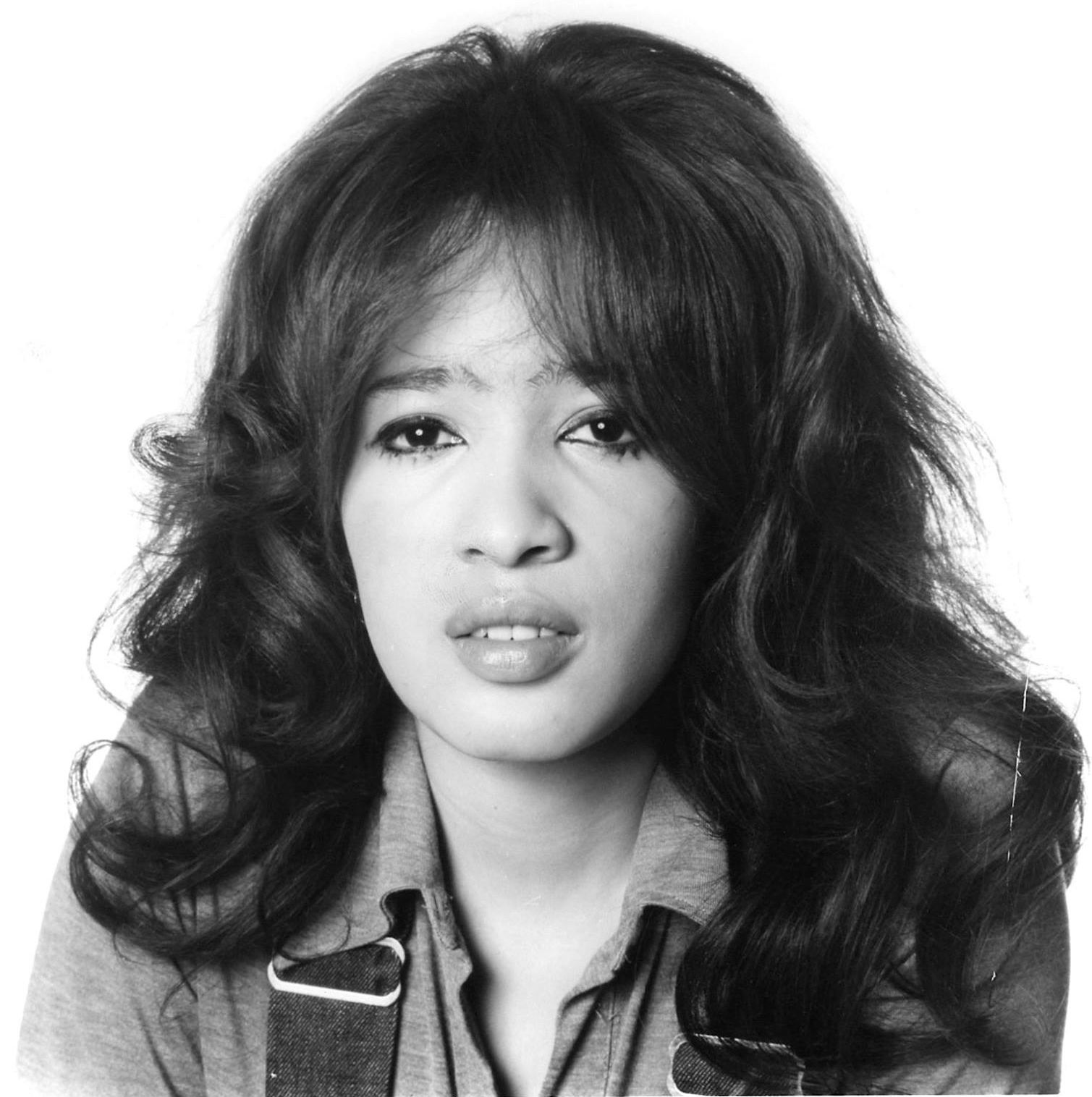
- Spector in 1971

Background information
- Also known as: Ronnie Bennett; Ronnie Greenfield
- Born: Veronica Yvette Bennett; August 10, 1943; Manhattan, New York City, U.S.
- Died: January 12, 2022 (aged 78) Danbury, Connecticut, U.S.
- Genres: Pop; rock
- Occupation: Singer
- Years active: 1959–2022
- Labels: Colpix; Philles; Columbia; Apple; Bad Girl Sounds
- Formerly of: The Ronettes
- Spouses: Phil Spector (m. 1968; div. 1974); Jonathan Greenfield (m. 1982)
- Children: 5
- Website: ronniespector.com

Veronica Yvette Greenfield (née Bennett; August 10, 1943 – January 12, 2022), known professionally as Ronnie Spector, was an American singer. Regarded as the "bad girl of rock and roll", she achieved international fame for founding and fronting the girl group the Ronettes.

Spector formed the singing group the Ronettes with her older sister, Estelle Bennett, and their cousin, Nedra Talley, in the late 1950s. They were signed to Phil Spector's Philles label in 1963 and he produced the majority of their recording output. The Ronettes had a string of hits in the 1960s, including "Be My Baby" (1963), "Baby, I Love You" (1963), "(The Best Part of) Breakin' Up" (1964), "Do I Love You?" (1964), and "Walking in the Rain" (1964). She married Phil Spector in 1968 and soon stopped performing publicly. She then fled from the home they shared in 1972 and filed for divorce in 1974. Afterwards she re-formed the Ronettes and began performing again.

In 1980, Spector released her debut solo album Siren. Her career revived when she was featured on Eddie Money's song and video "Take Me Home Tonight" in 1986, a Billboard top five single. She went on to release the albums Unfinished Business (1987), Something's Gonna Happen (2003), Last of the Rock Stars (2006) and English Heart (2016). She also recorded one extended play, She Talks to Rainbows (1999).

In 1990, Spector published a memoir, Be My Baby: How I Survived Mascara, Miniskirts, and Madness, Or, My Life as a Fabulous Ronette. She was inducted into the Rock and Roll Hall of Fame as a member of the Ronettes in 2007. In 2023, Rolling Stone ranked her at number 70 on its list of the 200 Greatest Singers of All Time.

== Early life ==
Ronnie was born Veronica Yvette Bennett in East Harlem, New York City, and grew up in the Washington Heights section of Manhattan. She was the daughter of Beatrice and Louis Bennett, a subway worker. Her parents were both described as African American, although Veronica claimed that their father was white and of Irish American ancestry and that their mother was of African American and Cherokee ancestry. Veronica and her sister Estelle Bennett (1941–2009) were encouraged to sing by their large family, as was their cousin Nedra Talley (1946–2026). The trio formed the Darling Sisters, known later as the Ronettes. They performed locally while attending George Washington High School in Washington Heights. Their look was fashioned by Estelle, who had a job at Macy's on the cosmetics counter. They sang at school events, and had a residency at the Peppermint Lounge, a nightspot in Manhattan, the birthplace of the Twist and go-go dancing.

== Career ==
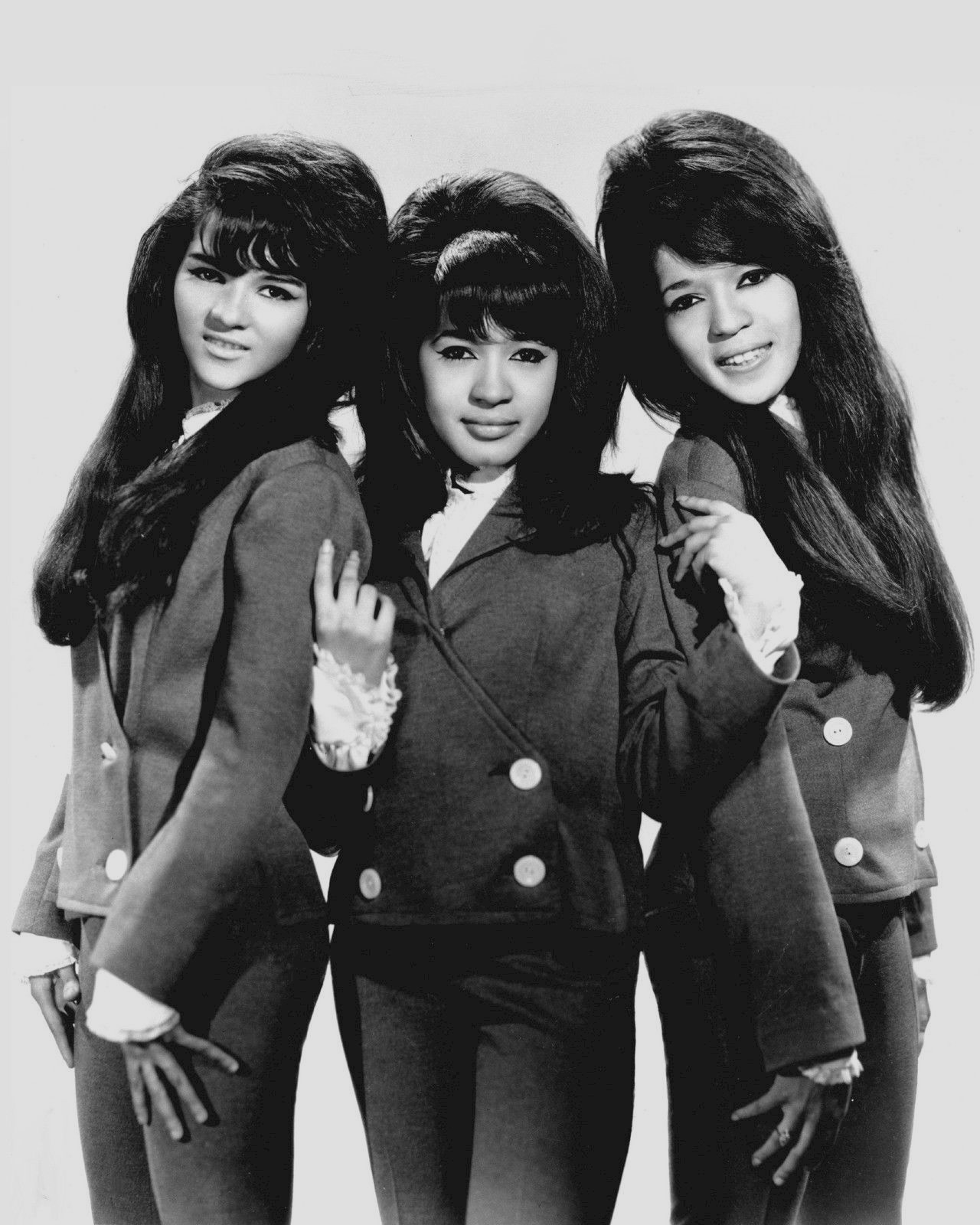
Ronnie Spector (center) with the Ronettes, 1966

=== 1963–1969: The Ronettes and early success ===
The Ronettes became a popular live attraction around the greater New York area in the early 1960s. Looking for a recording contract, they initially were signed to Colpix Records and produced by Stu Phillips. After releasing a few singles on Colpix without success, they tracked down record producer Phil Spector, who signed them to his label Philles Records in 1963. Their relationship with Spector brought chart success with their biggest hit "Be My Baby" in 1963, which peaked at No. 2 on the Billboard Hot 100. A string of top 40 pop hits followed with "Baby, I Love You" (1963), "(The Best Part of) Breakin' Up" (1964), "Do I Love You?" (1964), and "Walking in the Rain" (1964). The group had two entries on the Billboard Hot 100 in 1965 with "Born to Be Together" and "Is This What I Get for Loving You?".

In 1965, the Ronettes were voted the third-top singing group in England behind the Beatles and the Rolling Stones. They opened for the Beatles on their 1966 US tour without their lead singer. Phil had forbidden Bennett to tour with the Beatles, so her cousin Elaine stood in as a third member. The group's last charting single, "I Can Hear Music", was produced by Jeff Barry and reached No. 100 on the Billboard Hot 100 in 1966.

The Ronettes broke up in early 1967, following a European concert tour. After Bennett married Phil Spector in 1968, she began to use the name Ronnie Spector, but she withdrew from the spotlight because Phil prohibited her from performing and limited her recordings. In 1969, Phil signed a production deal with A&M Records and he released her record "You Came, You Saw, You Conquered", credited as "The Ronettes Featuring the Voice of Veronica", with "Oh I Love You", an old Ronettes B-side, as the flip. Her vocals were used for the lead and backing vocals. Phil kept many of the group's unreleased songs in a vault for years.

=== 1970–1982: Solo career and Siren ===
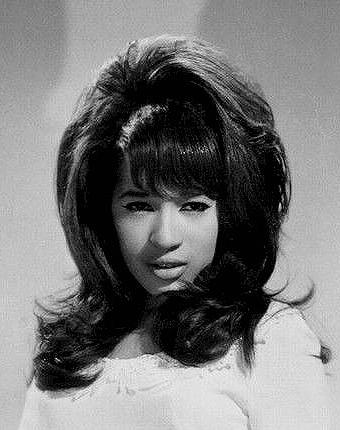
Spector in 1966

In February 1971, Ronnie Spector recorded the song "Try Some, Buy Some/Tandoori Chicken" at Abbey Road Studios during Phil's work with George Harrison. Written by Harrison, and produced by both Harrison and Phil, her debut solo single was released on Apple Records in April 1971. It peaked at No. 77 on the Billboard Hot 100 in May 1971. Although the single was not a big hit, its backing track was used two years later for Harrison's own version of the song, on his chart-topping Living in the Material World album. "Try Some, Buy Some" had another lasting influence when John Lennon recorded "Happy Xmas (War Is Over)" later the same year and asked Phil (co-producing again) to reproduce the mandolin-laden Wall of Sound he had created for that single. Lennon liked the rockabilly B-side too; he sang it at his birthday party in New York City in October 1971 (a recording of which has appeared on bootlegs). Spector recorded other Harrison songs during those London sessions—including "You" and "When Every Song Is Sung"—but her versions were never released, even though a full album had been planned.

After separating from Phil in 1972, she reformed the Ronettes (as Ronnie Spector and the Ronettes) with two new members (Chip Fields Hurd, the mother of actress Kim Fields, and Diane Linton) in 1973. They released a few singles on Buddah Records, but the records failed to chart. In 1973, Spector provided backing vocals with Liza Minnelli for Alice Cooper's song "Teenage Lament '74" from the album Muscle of Love (1973). By 1975, Spector was recording as a solo act. She released the single "You'd Be Good For Me" on Tom Cat Records in 1975. In 1976, she sang a duet with Southside Johnny on the recording "You Mean So Much To Me", penned by Southside's longtime friend Bruce Springsteen. This was the final track on the Southside Johnny & the Asbury Jukes' debut album I Don't Want to Go Home. She also made appearances with the E Street Band the following year, including a cover version of Billy Joel's 1976 track "Say Goodbye to Hollywood".

In her book, Spector recounted several abortive attempts to recapture mainstream success throughout the 1970s and early 1980s, during which time she was perceived as an oldies act. She recorded her first solo album in 1980, Siren, produced by Genya Ravan.

=== 1983–2002: "Take Me Home Tonight", Unfinished Business, and return to music ===
In 1986, Ronnie Spector enjoyed a resurgence of popular radio airplay as the featured vocalist on Eddie Money's Top 5 hit, "Take Me Home Tonight", in which she answers Money's chorus lyric, "just like Ronnie sang", with, "be my little baby". The song's music video was one of the top videos of the year and in heavy rotation on MTV. During this period, she also recorded the song "Tonight You're Mine, Baby" (from the film Just One of the Guys). In 1988, she began performing in Ronnie Spector's Christmas Party events, a seasonal staple at B.B. King Blues Club & Grill in New York City. In 1999, she released the EP, She Talks to Rainbows, which featured a few covers of older songs. Joey Ramone acted as producer.

In 1988, she and the other members of the Ronettes sued Phil Spector for nonpayment of royalties and for unpaid income he made from licensing of Ronettes' music. In 2001, a New York court announced a verdict in favor of the Ronettes, ordering him to pay $2.6 million in back royalties. The judgment was overturned by a Court of Appeals in 2002 and remanded back to the New York State Supreme Court. The judges found that their contract gave Phil unconditional rights to the recordings. It was ruled that Ronnie was entitled to her share of the royalties, which she had forfeited in her divorce settlement, but they reversed a lower court's ruling that the group were entitled to the music industry's standard 50 percent royalty rate. In the outcome, Phil paid in excess of $1 million to Ronnie Spector.

On January 10, 1992, Ronnie Spector performed at a concert called "Royalty of Rock: The Ultimate Reunion" at Madison Square Garden, alongside Dion & the Belmonts and Little Anthony and the Imperials, along with a one-off reunion of several former members of the Drifters, which included Ben E. King, Charlie Thomas, Johnny Moore, and Barry Hobbs.

In December 1998, having just signed to the Creation Records label, she appeared on the BBC's Later... with Jools Holland.

=== 2003–2022: Collaborations and English Heart ===
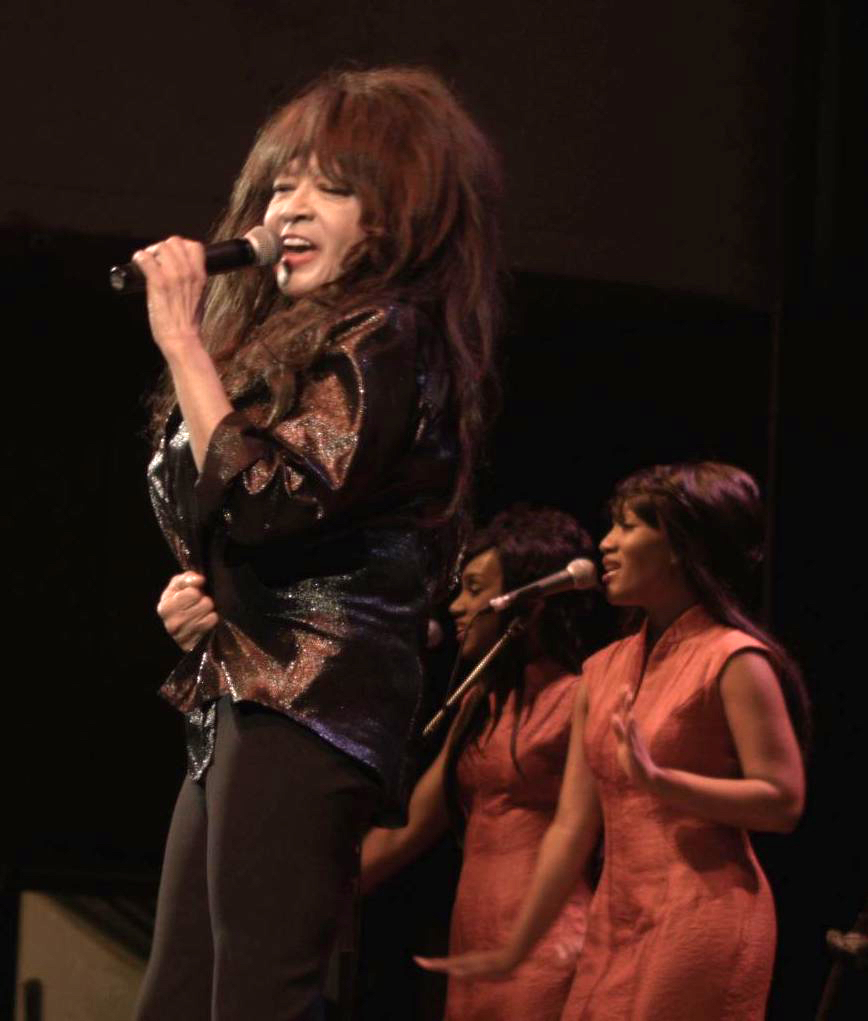
Spector performing in 2015

In 2003, Ronnie Spector provided backing vocals for The Misfits' album Project 1950 on the songs "This Magic Moment" and "You Belong to Me." In 2004, the Ronettes were inducted into the Vocal Group Hall of Fame. Spector provided guest vocals on the track "Ode to LA", on The Raveonettes' album Pretty in Black (2005). Her album, Last of the Rock Stars (2006), was released by High Coin and featured contributions from members of The Raconteurs, Nick Zinner of the Yeah Yeah Yeahs, The Raveonettes, Patti Smith, and Keith Richards. Spector herself co-produced two of the songs. Despite objections from Phil Spector, who was awaiting trial for murder, the Ronettes were inducted into the Rock & Roll Hall of Fame in 2007.

A Christmas EP, Ronnie Spector's Best Christmas Ever, was released on Bad Girl Sounds in November 2010, featuring five new Christmas songs. In 2011, after the death of Amy Winehouse, Spector released her version of Winehouse's single "Back to Black" (2006) as a tribute and for the benefit of the Daytop Village addiction treatment centers. She also performed this song as part of her live act, including in 2015 during a UK tour. She appeared on the 2014 New Year's Eve edition of the Jools' Annual Hootenanny.

In 2016, she released, through 429 Records, English Heart, her first album of new material in a decade. The album features her versions of songs of the British Invasion by the Beatles, the Rolling Stones, the Yardbirds, the Bee Gees, and others, produced by Scott Jacoby. English Heart peaked at No. 6 on the Billboard Top Heatseekers chart. On August 9, 2017, People premiered a new single, "Love Power" by Ronnie Spector and the Ronettes, produced by Narada Michael Walden, making it the first Ronettes single in decades.

In 2018, Spector appeared in the music documentary Amy Winehouse: Back to Black (2018), based on Winehouse and her final studio album Back to Black. The album was inspired by 1960s girl groups Winehouse gathered inspiration from listening to, such as the Ronettes. It contained new interviews as well as archival footage. Spector was a great inspiration for Winehouse, who emulated her hair, as well as vocal style. In return, Ronnie Spector covered "Back to Black", Winehouse's signature song. She recalls that Winehouse turned up at a concert looking just like her while she sang her song. Spector recalled seeing "a tear out of her (Winehouse) eye and it made me cry".

In December 2021, the Ronettes returned to the Top 10 for the first time in 58 years with their 1963 recording of "Sleigh Ride". Following her death in January 2022, the BBC broadcast the compilation tribute Ronnie Spector at the BBC.

== Autobiography ==
She released her memoir Be My Baby: How I Survived Mascara, Miniskirts, and Madness, Or, My Life as a Fabulous Ronette in 1990; the book was later named by Rolling Stone contributor Rob Sheffield as one of the greatest rock biographies of all time. An updated version titled Be My Baby: A Memoir was completed in late 2021, just two months before Spector's death, and was released in May 2022.

== Personal life and death ==
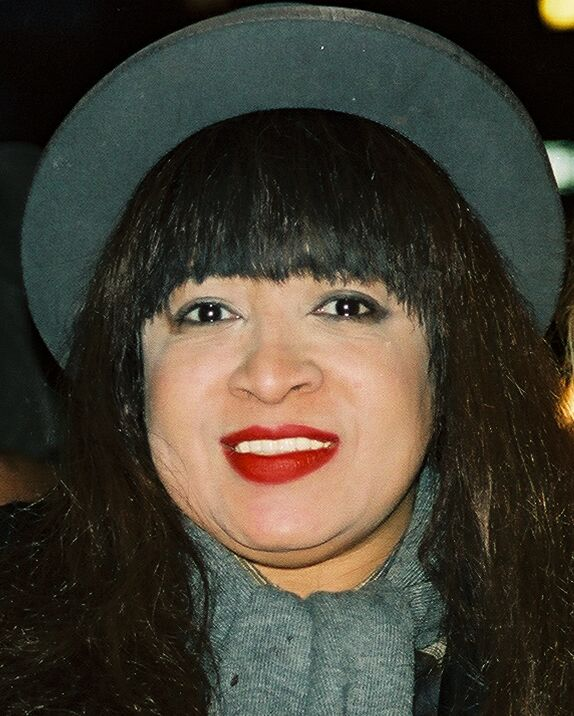
Spector in 2000

Ronnie and Phil Spector began having an affair soon after she was signed to his label in 1963. Early in their relationship, she was unaware that he was married. Once, Ronnie was apprehended by house detectives for prostitution at the Delmonico Hotel in New York City after leaving a room they had booked. She was allowed to call Phil, who threatened the hotel, and then they allowed her to leave. After Phil divorced his wife in 1965, he purchased a home in Beverly Hills, where he lived with Ronnie. They married at Beverly Hills City Hall on April 14, 1968. Ronnie changed her surname and became known as Ronnie Spector. Their son Donté Phillip was adopted in 1969. Two years later, Phil surprised her for Christmas with adopted twins, Louis and Gary.

Ronnie alleged in her 1990 memoir that following their marriage, Phil subjected her to years of psychological torment and sabotaged her career by forbidding her to perform. She said he surrounded their house with barbed wire and guard dogs, and confiscated her shoes to prevent her from leaving; on the rare occasions he allowed her out alone, she had to drive with a life-size dummy of Phil. She stated that Phil installed a gold coffin with a glass top in the basement, promising that he would kill her and display her corpse if she ever left him. She began drinking and attending Alcoholics Anonymous (AA) meetings to escape the house.

In 1972, Ronnie fled their mansion barefoot and without any belongings, with the help of her mother. "I knew that if I didn't leave I was going to die there," she said. In their 1974 divorce settlement, Ronnie forfeited all future record earnings, alleging that Phil had threatened to have a hit man kill her. She received $25,000, a used car, and monthly alimony of $2,500 for five years. She later testified that Phil had frequently pulled a gun on her during their marriage and threatened to kill her unless she surrendered custody of their children.

She tried to rebuild her career, keeping Phil Spector's surname professionally because "I needed any way I could to get back in, I'd been kept away so long." According to her, Phil hired lawyers to prevent her singing her popular songs and denied her royalties. In 1988, the Ronettes sued Phil for $10 million in damages, rescission of the contract, the return of the masters, and recoupment of money received from the sale of Ronettes masters. It took ten years for the case to make it to trial. After a prolonged legal battle, the court ruled that their contract gave Phil unconditional rights to the recordings but Ronnie was entitled to her share of royalties.

In 1983, she married her manager Jonathan Greenfield. They had two sons, and lived in Danbury, Connecticut.

Spector died at her home in Danbury on January 12, 2022, shortly after a cancer diagnosis, at the age of 78.

== In popular culture ==
In September 2020, Deadline reported that actress Zendaya would portray Spector in a biopic adapted from her memoir Be My Baby. Before she died, Spector personally selected the actress to portray her. Not much more information about this project became available until five years later, when Barry Jenkins was reported to be attached as director.

== Discography ==
=== The Ronettes ===
- Presenting the Fabulous Ronettes Featuring Veronica, 1964
- Sing Their Greatest Hits, 1975
- The Greatest Hits, Vol. 2, 1981
- The Best of The Ronettes, 1992

=== Solo albums ===
Title	Album details	Peak chart positions
Title	Album details	US Heat
Siren	Released: 1980; Label: RCA, Polish Records	–
Unfinished Business	Released: May 1987; Label: Columbia/CBS	–
The Last of the Rock Stars	Released: 2006; Label: High Coin	–
English Heart	Released: April 8, 2016; Label: 429	6
"—" denotes a release that did not chart.

=== EPs ===
- She Talks to Rainbows EP, 1999
- Something's Gonna Happen EP, 2003
- Best Christmas Ever EP, 2010

=== Solo singles ===
Sources:

- 1964: "So Young" (as Veronica) (Phil Spector Records PHIL. 1)
- 1964: "Why Don't They Let Us Fall in Love" (as Veronica) (Phil Spector Records 2)
- 1971: "Try Some, Buy Some" (Apple 1832)
- 1975: "You'd Be Good For Me" (Tom Cat YB-10380)
- 1976: "Paradise" (Warner Spector SPS 0409)
- 1977: "Say Goodbye To Hollywood" (Epic 8–50374)
- 1978: "It's a Heartache" (Alston 3738)
- 1980: "Darlin'" (Polish PR-202)
- 1987: "Who Can Sleep" (Columbia 38-07082)
- 1987: "Love On a Rooftop" (Columbia 38-07300)

== Publications ==
- Spector, Ronnie; Waldron, Vince (1990). Be My Baby: How I Survived Mascara, Miniskirts, and Madness, or My Life as a Fabulous Ronette (1st ed.). New York: Harmony Books. ISBN 0-517-57499-3. OCLC 21196925.
