= The Hand That Rocks the Cradle (2025 film) =

The Hand that Rocks the Cradle
- Release poster
- Directed by: Michelle Garza Cervera
- Screenplay by: Micah Bloomberg
- Based on: The Hand That Rocks the Cradle by Amanda Silver
- Produced by: Ted Field; Michael Schaefer; Mike Larocca
- Starring: Mary Elizabeth Winstead; Maika Monroe; Raúl Castillo; Martin Starr
- Cinematography: Jo Willems
- Edited by: Julie Monroe
- Music by: Ariel Marx
- Production companies: 20th Century Studios; Department M; Radar Pictures
- Distributed by: Hulu
- Release date: October 22, 2025
- Running time: 105 minutes
- Country: United States
- Language: English

The Hand That Rocks the Cradle is a 2025 American thriller film directed by Michelle Garza Cervera and written by Micah Bloomberg. It is a loose remake of the 1992 film and stars Mary Elizabeth Winstead, Maika Monroe, Raúl Castillo, and Martin Starr.

The film was released in the United States on Hulu and internationally on Disney+ on October 22, 2025. Critical reception was mixed; critics praised the performances and moments of sustained tension, but had more divided opinions on its narrative necessity and tonal execution.

== Plot ==
In Los Angeles, pregnant attorney Caitlyn Morales is assigned to represent Polly Murphy, a young woman facing eviction and homelessness. Shortly after their first meeting, Caitlyn gives birth to her second daughter, Josie, while struggling to balance motherhood, career, and her volatile older child, Emma. When the women meet again, Polly asks for employment as the family's nanny. Polly quickly becomes indispensable, charming both Emma and Caitlyn's husband, Miguel, with her warmth and attentiveness. However, beneath her composure lies malice. She secretly poisons Caitlyn and the children by spiking a seafood stew, ensuring their illness appears coincidental. Grateful for her continued help, Caitlyn and Miguel invite Polly to live in their guest house, allowing her to subtly overstep household boundaries.

Polly discovers that Caitlyn takes medication for an unspecified mental condition. Replacing the pills with carved methamphetamine tablets, she gradually destabilizes Caitlyn's mental state. Paranoia, irritability, and jealousy over Polly's growing influence on Emma begin to consume her. When Emma accidentally ignites fireworks that Polly had provided, Caitlyn lashes out and fires her, ignoring Miguel's pleas for leniency. Wracked with guilt and fearful of alienating Emma, Caitlyn tracks Polly to a dilapidated motel, apologizes and rehires her. Meanwhile, she enlists her neighbor, Stewart, to investigate Polly's past. Caitlyn also contacts a supposed former employer listed as a reference, learning the woman had met Polly at an Alcoholics Anonymous meeting and had been deceived by her fabricated story of abuse.

Stewart confronts Polly with the results of his background check, revealing that her true name is Rebecca, and that both she and Caitlyn—whose real name is Jennifer—share a dark history. Years earlier in San Bernardino, a fire set by young Jennifer had destroyed Rebecca's home, killing her parents and infant sister. Jennifer was given a new identity and a second chance, while Rebecca endured years of trauma in abusive foster homes. Although Stewart urges forgiveness, Polly bludgeons him to death with a baseball bat, stealing his research before fleeing. Caitlyn learns of Stewart's murder and rushes home, only to find Polly calmly dining with Miguel and the children while dressed in Caitlyn's clothes. Enraged, Caitlyn destroys Polly's belongings and lunges at her, accidentally striking Emma during the struggle. Miguel, horrified, kicks Caitlyn from the house and files domestic violence charges, barring her from seeing her daughters unsupervised. Desperate, Caitlyn later appears at Emma's basketball game and pleads for reconciliation. Emma forgives her and secretly returns Stewart's documents which she stole from Polly. A childhood photograph of Polly triggers Caitlyn's memory, and she recognizes Polly as the surviving child from the fire.

Racing home, Caitlyn finds Polly fully transformed into her double, even replicating her hairstyle and mannerisms. The two share a tense confrontation in the kitchen. Caitlyn confesses that she set the fire not out of malice but to escape Polly's father, who had sexually abused the both of them. Polly doubts her sincerity but acknowledges that, true or not, Caitlyn robbed her of a family and any chance at happiness. Caitlyn attempts to embrace her, but Polly shatters a glass and stabs her, declaring her intent to assume Caitlyn's life and raise her children as her own. A violent struggle follows, culminating with Caitlyn pushing Polly through a plate-glass window. As Caitlyn flees with Josie, Polly attacks their car, causing Caitlyn to swerve into oncoming traffic. The crash leaves Caitlyn and Josie dazed, while Polly is flung to the street, suffering fatal injuries. Witnessing the event, Miguel arrives with Emma and apologizes for doubting Caitlyn. She holds Polly as she bleeds to death from a destroyed arm.

Later, Caitlyn stares into a lit fire, haunted but alive. Nearby, Emma imitates Polly's gestures to Josie and repeats one of her stories about life in foster care, soothing her baby sister.

== Cast ==
- Mary Elizabeth Winstead as Caitlyn Morales / Jennifer
- Maika Monroe as Polly Murphy / Rebecca
- Raúl Castillo as Miguel Morales, Caitlyn's husband
- Mileiah Vega as Emma Morales, Caitlyn and Miguel's daughter
- Nora and Lola Contreras as Josie Morales, Caitlyn and Miguel's infant daughter
- Martin Starr as Stewart
- Riki Lindhome as Bethany
- Shannon Cochran as Rosanna

== Production ==
The film was made by 20th Century Studios with Ted Field producing through Radar Pictures along with Michael Schaefer and Mike Larocca through Department M. In October 2024, Maika Monroe and Mary Elizabeth Winstead were in talks to star. In November, Raúl Castillo joined the film, with Monroe and Winstead officially cast. Martin Starr joined in December.

Principal photography in Los Angeles began by December 2024. In January 2025, filming was halted due to the Southern California wildfires, and had wrapped by March.

== Release ==
The Hand That Rocks the Cradle was released on Hulu in the United States and Disney+ internationally under the Hulu hub on October 22, 2025.

== Soundtrack ==
The soundtrack for the film was composed by Ariel Marx. It was released through Hollywood Records on October 22, 2025.

== Reception ==
On the review aggregator website Rotten Tomatoes, 43% of 63 critics' reviews are positive, with an average rating of 5.6/10. The website's consensus reads: "A flat and unnecessary remake that squanders its presence on convoluted plotting and meager thrills, The Hand That Rocks The Cradle is salvaged only slightly by Maika Monroe's committed performance." Metacritic, which uses a weighted average, assigned the film a score of 52 out of 100, based on 14 critics, indicating "mixed or average" reviews.

Critics consistently praised Winstead's portrayal; (Note: Multiple references:) Kevin Maher of The Times described her as a powerhouse in her "most fruitful role" since Smashed (2012) and The New York Times's Chris Azzopardi found her to be "doing miracles" for the film. Most critics also lauded Monroe's turn as the antagonist; (Note: Multiple references:) Maher deemed it "fabulously boo-hiss", but Azzopardi thought her performance was "merely chilly, lumbering like a mopey teenager stuck with reciting unintentionally funny lines" and David Rooney of The Hollywood Reporter found it less convincing compared to her previous roles. Several reviewers agreed that the film maintained strong tension and atmosphere, aided by careful direction, score, and attention to character dynamics. (Note: Multiple references:)

Other critics were less charitable, arguing that it was an unnecessary remake that lacked the spark of the original and labeling it flat or predictable. (Note: Multiple references:) Benjamin Lee from The Guardian noted that it was "one of the less egregious" nostalgia-driven remakes and was "serviceably entertaining", The Playlist's Allyson Johnson dismissed it as a "lackluster, at times aggravating, mess."

The film's ending was cited as underwhelming or overly self-serious, sapping the tension built earlier in the narrative.

Winstead and Monroe discussed the queer subtext between their characters, saying they could see a romantic tension in Caitlyn and Polly's relationship despite it not being explicitly written as a romance. They described the connection between the characters as containing ambiguity and intimacy, particularly in scenes involving physical closeness and emotional conflict.
