= William Ross Wallace =

American poet (1819–1881)

William Ross Wallace (1819 – May 5, 1881) was an American poet, with Scottish roots, best known for writing "The Hand That Rocks The Cradle Is The Hand That Rules The World".

== Early life ==
Wallace was born in Lexington, Kentucky in 1819. (Note: Wallace's obituary in The New York Times lists his place of birth as Paris, Kentucky. Most sources state he was born in Lexington, however.) His father, a Presbyterian preacher, died when Wallace was an infant.

Wallace was educated at Indiana University Bloomington and Hanover College, Indiana, and studied law in Lexington, Kentucky.

== Career ==
In 1841, he moved to New York City, where he practiced law, and at the same time engaged in literary pursuits. "Perdita", a poem, was his first work. Published in the Union Magazine, it attracted favorable criticism and was followed by "Alban" (1848), a poetical romance, and "Meditations in America" (1851). Other poems that attained popularity include "The Sword of Bunker Hill" (1861), a national hymn; "Keep Step with the Music of the Union" (1861); "The Liberty Bell" (1862); and his most famous poem, "The Hand That Rocks The Cradle Is The Hand That Rules The World" (1865), a poem praising motherhood. He contributed to Godey's Lady's Book, Harper's Magazine, Harper's Weekly, the New York Ledger, and the Louisville Daily Journal. William Cullen Bryant said of his writings: "They are marked by a splendor of imagination and an affluence of diction which show him the born poet." Edgar Allan Poe, a friend of Wallace, referred to him as "one of the very noblest of American poets". Wallace died at his home in New York City on May 5, 1881, a week after suffering a stroke. He was working on a book to be titled Pleasures of the Beautiful at the time of his death.

== Personal life ==
Wallace married his second wife Ann Polhemus Riker, the daughter of Daniel Riker (1771–1828) and Helen Polhemus (1783–?), in October 1856. They had two daughters and a son.

== Books by Wallace ==
- The Battle of Tippecanoe, Triumphs of Science, and Other Poems (1837)
- Wordsworth: A Poem (1846)
- Alban the Pirate: A Romaunt of the Metropolis (1848)
- Meditations in America, and Other Poems (1851)
- Prattsville, an American Poem (1852)
- The Loved and the Lost (1856)
- Progress of the United States: Henry Clay, an Ode "Of Thine Own Country Sing" (1856)
- Patriotic and Heroic Eloquence: A Book for the Patriot, Statesman and Student (1861)
- The Liberty Bell (1862)
