= Take Me Home Tonight (song) =

- UK 7-inch vinyl picture sleeve

Single by Eddie Money

from the album Can't Hold Back
- B-side: "Calm Before the Storm"
- Released: August 1986
- Recorded: 1985
- Genre: Pop rock; power pop
- Length: 3:35
- Label: Columbia
- Songwriters: Mick Leeson; Peter Vale; Ellie Greenwich; Jeff Barry; Phil Spector
- Producers: Eddie Money; Richie Zito; Jacob Dooley

Eddie Money singles chronology
"Club Michelle" (1984)	"Take Me Home Tonight" (1986)	"I Wanna Go Back" (1986)

Music video
- "Take Me Home Tonight" on YouTube

"Take Me Home Tonight" is a song by American rock singer Eddie Money. It was released in August 1986 as the lead single from his album Can't Hold Back. The song's chorus interpolates the Ronettes' 1963 hit "Be My Baby", with original vocalist Ronnie Spector providing uncredited vocals and reprising her role. Songwriting credit was given to Mike Leeson, Peter Vale, Ellie Greenwich, Phil Spector and Jeff Barry.

The song reached No.4 on the Billboard Hot 100 on November 15, 1986, and No.1 on the Album Rock Tracks chart; outside the U.S., it was a top 15 hit in Canada. It only reached No.200 in the UK charts in January 1987. It received a Grammy nomination for Best Male Rock Vocal Performance, and was Money's biggest hit on the U.S. charts.

Alongside its album, "Take Me Home Tonight" helped revive Money's career after a period of declining sales. It also allowed Spector to resume her touring/recording career after several years of retirement.

== Background ==
By the mid-1980s, Eddie Money had reached a low point in his recording career after several years of drug abuse. Columbia Records still wanted to keep Money on its roster, but restricted his creative control over his work. Record producer Richie Zito brought Money the song "Take Me Home Tonight". Money would later say, "I didn't care for the demo [but] it did have a good catch line. When I heard [a snippet of] 'Be My Baby' in it I said: 'Why can't we get Ronnie Spector to sing it?'" The reply was, "That's impossible." Money invited his friend Martha Davis, lead vocalist of The Motels, to rerecord the lines from "Be My Baby" for "Take Me Home Tonight". However, Davis encouraged him to try to recruit Spector. Money was eventually able to reach Spector by phone at her home in northern California. Recalled Money, "I could hear clinking and clanking in the background ... She said: 'I'm doing the dishes, and I gotta change the kids' bedding. I'm not really in the business anymore, Eddie. Phil Spector and all that, it was a nightmare' ... I said 'Ronnie, I got this song that's truly amazing and it's a tribute to you. It would be so great if you ... did it with me.'" Money has stated that recording the song "helped Ronnie out and it helped me get some of my other material on the album across, so now I'm happy I did it." The song's success encouraged Spector to resume her singing career, and she released her second solo album, Unfinished Business, in 1987.

== Music video ==
The video was directed by Nick Morris and shot entirely in black and white at the Lawlor Events Center in Reno, Nevada. It opens with Money alone with a metal ladder and a folding chair on an otherwise empty stage. He sings and plays an alto saxophone to an absent audience, while Ronnie Spector is seen in a make-up room and then walking through a backstage hallway to the arena floor during cutaways. Spector's face is not completely revealed until about three-quarters of the way through the video.

== Critical reception ==
Upon its release, Billboard called "Take Me Home Tonight" a "power pop song dotted with Ronettes quotes". Cash Box considered it to be a "moody, graceful rocker" which is "sure to capture CHR and AOR". The Los Angeles Times's Steve Hochman, in a review of Can't Hold Back, felt that Money did Spector a disservice, particularly with the song's "characterless production," commenting, "where Phil Spector built his wall with style and grace, Money has erected a monolithic barrier."

=== Accolades ===
The song was nominated for Best Male Rock Vocal Performance at the 29th Annual Grammy Awards on February 24, 1987, but lost to Robert Palmer's "Addicted to Love".

== In popular culture ==
The song was sampled and interpolated by New Zealand rapper PNC in "Take Me Home" featuring Mz J from the album Bazooka Kid.

== Commercial performance ==
In Canada, it debuted on RPM's Top Singles chart at number 95 in the issue dated October 4, 1986, and peaked at number 15 during the week of November 29, 1986.

== Charts ==
=== Weekly charts ===
Chart (1986–1987)	Peak position
Australia (Kent Music Report)	46
Canada (The Record)	26
Canada Top Singles (RPM)	15
Netherlands (Single Top 100)	43
US Billboard Hot 100	4
US Radio & Records CHR/Pop Airplay Chart	5
US Mainstream Rock Airplay (Billboard)	1
West Germany (GfK)	59

=== Year-end charts ===
Chart (1986)	Rank
US Top Pop Singles (Billboard)	59

== Certifications ==
Certifications for "Take Me Home Tonight"
Region	Certification	Certified units/sales
New Zealand (RMNZ)	Gold	15,000^{‡}
^{‡} Sales+streaming figures based on certification alone.
