= Be My Baby (book) =

Memoir by Ronnie Spector

Be My Baby: How I Survived Mascara, Miniskirts, and Madness
- Author: Ronnie Spector, Vince Waldron
- Publisher: Harmony Books
- Publication date: September 1, 1990

Be My Baby: How I Survived Mascara, Miniskirts, and Madness, Or, My Life as a Fabulous Ronette (also published as Be My Baby: The Autobiography of Ronnie Spector) is a 1990 memoir by American singer Ronnie Spector, co-written with Vince Waldron.

The book recounts her career as lead singer of the Ronettes and her emotionally abusive marriage to songwriter-producer Phil Spector. A film adaptation starring Zendaya as Ronnie was announced in 2021.

== Publication ==
The book was first published on September 1, 1990 by Harmony. The cover was a color headshot of Spector. A second updated edition was released in 2014 with additional material and photos. The 2014 cover, shown here, is of all three Ronettes. This edition contains 75 new and exclusive color and black-and-white photos and an updated, comprehensive discography from 1961 through 2014.

A third updated and further expanded edition titled Be My Baby: A Memoir, was completed shortly before Spector's death in January 2022. The cover is an updated semi-full shot color photo of Ronnie. This edition features a new postscript by Spector describing her life after 1990 and a new introduction by Keith Richards. The book was published by Henry Holt & Co. the following May, 2022.

== Content ==
Be My Baby recounts Spector's career as lead singer of the Ronettes and her emotionally abusive marriage to Phil Spector.

Born in Spanish Harlem, Veronica Bennett always loved to sing. As teens, she, her sister, and her cousin met an agent who introduced them to a producer, and they made a record. Soon they started performing at the Brooklyn Fox rock-and-roll revue alongside The Shirelles, The Supremes, Marvin Gaye, and others. In 1963, Phil Spector signed them and Ronnie fell in love with him. "Be My Baby" became their first and biggest hit. The group toured England, where The Rolling Stones were their opening act and they became friends with The Beatles. Phil was fiercely possessive and became very controlling. He convinced her not to open for the Beatles. He became increasingly reclusive and violent after they married. Ronnie was imprisoned in their home and forbidden to perform. Finally, she left him and tried to relaunch her career.

Phil threatened Ronnie with a glass coffin in the basement, declaring that he would display her dead body in it after he murdered her. He turned their house into a prison, with barbed wire and dogs, and kept her from leaving while making her record songs. As their marriage deteriorated, in order to find another way to emotionally manipulate her into staying, he coerced her into adopting twins for Christmas. He hid her shoes so that she could not run away, and forbade all contact with her friends and family. Phil also threatened to stalk her, and to hire hit men to murder her if she escaped the prison he had trapped her in. Ronnie would often purposely drink too much so she would be sent to the hospital, rather than stay at home and continue to suffer Phil's psychological abuse. Eventually, with help from her mother, Ronnie managed to gather the courage to escape, barefoot, so as not to arouse Phil's suspicions. The book’s final chapters describe Ronnie’s long and ultimately successful journey to rebuild her career and recover from the trauma of her first marriage.

== Reception ==
The memoir has received widely favorable reviews across several decades since its publication. In Rolling Stone in 2012, Rob Sheffield named it as one of the 25 best rock memoirs of all time, saying "her book, like her voice, is full of cocky, smart, self-aware humor." Writing of the book's sections "describ[ing]" her time with The Beatles and the Stones, both in the U.K. and stateside," at NPR in 2016 Alison Fensterstock said Be My Baby: "deliver[s] a wild, funny, intimate and detailed account of a bunch of kids navigating fame and fun; they also describe, essentially, the singer's last flush of freedom before her relationship with Phil Spector really got bad."

The autobiography is excerpted in the 2013 Routledge anthology The Rock History Reader, which describes Be My Baby as "offering a little-seen window into the complex creative processes and inordinate power relationships behind the girl group phenomenon", in contrast to frequently trivializing depictions of the genre, or otherwise focused solely on the accomplishments of "their Svengali-like male producer or the song-writing teams that provided them with their hits."
