= The Hand That Rocks the Cradle (poem) =

Poem by William Ross Wallace

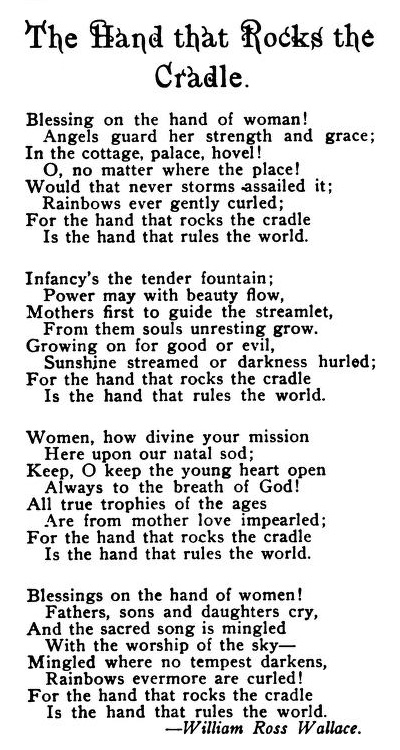
"The Hand That Rocks the Cradle" as published in Loomis' Musical And Masonic Journal (1898)

"The Hand That Rocks the Cradle Is the Hand That Rules the World" is a poem by William Ross Wallace that praises motherhood as the preeminent force for change in the world.

The poem was first published in 1865 under the title "What Rules the World". Although the poem itself is now largely forgotten, the poem's refrain became a commonly quoted proverb.
