= She Talks to Rainbows =

EP by Ronnie Spector
- Released: September 14, 1999
- Label: Kill Rock Stars
- Producer: Joey Ramone, Daniel Rey

Professional ratings
Review scores
Source	Rating
AllMusic	3/5 stars
Robert Christgau	(1-star Honorable Mention)
Entertainment Weekly	B−
Rolling Stone	3.5/5 stars
The New Rolling Stone Album Guide	3/5 stars

She Talks to Rainbows is an EP by Ronnie Spector, released in 1999. It was originally released in the UK via Creation Records.

== Production ==
She Talks to Rainbows was produced by Joey Ramone and Daniel Rey.

The EP contains two late-period Ramones songs ("She Talks to Rainbows", from ¡Adios Amigos!, and "Bye Bye Baby", from Halfway to Sanity), and versions of songs by the Beach Boys, Johnny Thunders, and the Ronettes. Brian Wilson had originally written "Don't Worry Baby" for Spector.

== Critical reception ==
Entertainment Weekly wrote that Spector's "bruised, cracked vocals work wonders on the Beach Boys' 'Don't Worry Baby'." The Village Voice wrote: "Tough and ruefully tender, a dialectic of vulnerability and guts runs through the four songs." Goldmine wrote that the EP "has a warmth and a richness that pulls you in from the first note, with Ronnie's voice as mesmerizing as ever."

== Track listing ==
1. "She Talks to Rainbows" (Joey Ramone)
2. "Don't Worry Baby" (Brian Wilson, Roger Christian)
3. "You Can't Put Your Arms Around a Memory" (Johnny Thunders)
4. "Bye Bye Baby" (duet with Joey Ramone) (Joey Ramone)
5. "I Wish I Never Saw the Sunshine" (live) (Ellie Greenwich, Jeff Barry, Phil Spector)
