= Cherry Wainer =

Rock and Roll musician (1935–2014)

- sleeve of single Red River Rock, 1961
- Born: March 2, 1935; East London, Eastern Cape, South Africa
- Died: November 14, 2014 (aged 79); Las Vegas, Nevada, U.S.
- Spouse: Don Storer (died 2006)

Cherry Wainer (March 2, 1935 – November 14, 2014) was a South African-born musician, best known as a member of Lord Rockingham's XI and a soloist on the Hammond organ.

== Biography ==
Wainer was born in East London, Eastern Cape, South Africa, the daughter of a music promoter. A piano player since childhood, she once said: "I was going to be a classical pianist and at the age of eight, I performed a concerto with an orchestra." When taking up the Hammond organ, she was influenced by American jazz organist Jimmy Smith.

In her first recording, she collaborated with accordionist Nico Carstens on an early South African rock and roll 10" LP titled Flying High. On moving to the United Kingdom in 1958 with drummer and future husband Don Storer, her flatmate, singer Georgia Brown, introduced Wainer to her manager, Tito Burns, who managed to gain spots for her on the light-entertainment programme Lunchbox. She became a regular on ATV-Midland's Lunchbox from Birmingham, which was hosted by Noele Gordon.

From summer 1958, Wainer was the featured Hammond organist in groundbreaking young producer Jack Good's ABC-TV Oh Boy!, one of Britain's first teenage all-music live TV shows following Good's resignation from his BBC-TV hit show Six-Five Special. Oh Boy! (named by Good after Buddy Holly & the Crickets' 1957 hit single "Oh, Boy!") featured rock and roll regularly, with Lord Rockingham's XI serving as the house band used to support singers, which was led by Harry Robinson and included Benny Green and Red Price. Their single, "Hoots Mon", was number one on the UK charts in 1958. She occasionally sang vocals on the show, and became close to one of the acts who appeared regularly in Oh Boy!, the teenage Cliff Richard, effectively serving as his chaperone.

Along with the band, Wainer played in the 1959 Royal Variety Performance, held at the Palace Theatre, Manchester. In 1960, she appeared as herself in the musical Girls of the Latin Quarter.

Wainer married drummer Don Storer with whom she appeared regularly as a duo during the 1960s. They appeared regularly in the German television series, Beat! Beat! Beat (1967). Wainer released several solo albums and singles, none of which made the UK charts. Wainer and her husband moved to Las Vegas in 1968, working in cabaret. She later retired from music but remained in Las Vegas and worked in a gift shop. Her husband died in 2006.

In 2013, she appeared in the BBC documentary 50's Britannia.

Wainer died on November 14, 2014, in Las Vegas, Nevada, aged 79.

== Albums ==
- HMV JDLP 10007, Cherry Pink, (1957), (released in South Africa), Cherry Wainer & Don Storer
- Columbia 33JS 11007, Flying High, (1959), (released in South Africa), Cherry Wainer & Nico Carstens
- HMV JDLP 10006, Cherry Rock, (1959), (released in South Africa), Cherry Wainer & Don Storer
- Waltzes in Swingtime, (1960), (released in UK), Cherry Wainer and the Knightsbridge Brass
- Cherry Wainer and Her Magic Organ (released in the Netherlands)
- Discs K 1237, The Sound of the Sixties - Showtime in Your Club - Wainer's a Winner, (released in Germany), Cherry Wainer & Don Storer
- Rhythmus Im Blut, (1964), (released in Germany), Cherry Wainer & Don Storer
- It's Hammond Time!, (1965), (released in the Netherlands), Cherry Wainer & Don Storer
- Musik Im Blut, (1966), (released in Germany), Cherry Wainer & Don Storer
- Cherry Wainer – Hammond Organ Light and Lively, (1969), Cherry Wainer & Don Storer, A compilation of Rhythmus Im Blut and Musik Im Blut albums
