= Catch My Soul (UK original cast album) =

Catch my Soul
- Music as interpreted by Gass

Live album by The cast of Jack Good's Catch My Soul
- Released: 1971
- Recorded: 1969
- Genre: Rock
- Label: Polydor
- Producer: Jack Good

The cast of Jack Good's Catch My Soul chronology
| Catch my Soul (1971) | Catch My Soul (1974) |

Catch My Soul. A live recording of the original cast was recorded with the original UK cast of Jack Good's Catch My Soul-The Rock Othello. It featured the rock band Gass who had been the house band for the UK stage production.

The album was made in conjunction with Jack Good Productions who brought in vocal and musical arrangers Emil Dean Zoghby, John Bennett and Phil Kenzie. The album was recorded over several days at The Birmingham Repertory Theatre using the Pye mobile studio and was produced by Peter Knight.

== Track listing ==
Side one

1. "Goats And Monkeys'" (performed by Gass)
2. "Wedding Chant" (performed by Emil Dean Zoghby)
3. "Ballad Of Catch My Soul" (performed by Lance LeGault)
4. "Drunk" performed by (P.J. Proby)
5. "If Wives Do Fall" (performed by Dorothy Vernon)
6. "Cannikins" (performed by Lance LeGault)

Side two

1. "Put Out The Light" (performed by Robert Tench)
2. "You Told A Lie" (performed by Dorothy Vernon and Lance LeGault)
3. "Very Well-Go To" (performed by Jeffry Wickham and Lance LeGault)
4. "Willow" (performed by Sharon Gurney)
5. "Seven Days And Night" (performed by P.P. Arnold and P.J. Proby)
6. "Why" performed by (Jack Good)
7. "Black On White" (performed by P. P. Arnold, P.J. Proby and Robert Tench)
8. "Death Chant" (performed by Emil Dean Zoghby)

== Album sleeve ==
The album sleeve stated: "Jack Good Production Ltd & Theatre Projects Associates Ltd presents the '69 Theatre Company production of Jack Good's Catch My Soul-The Rock Othello". Jack Good, the producer of the show, wrote:

So if you hurt the one you love, it's because you love her best of all, as I believe the Marquis de Sade once remarked. I love Shakespeare's Othello. I also love rock. This long-long-long playing record is an all live, un-retouched and not post-dubbed, but you can't have everything as I believe that other eminent Balliol man Edward Heath once remarked. Now to biographical comment on myself. In the mid fifties, I used to be Jack Good, the bright eyed Boy wonder, producer of the epoch-making Rock TV sensations, Six-Five Special and Oh Boy!. Today I am nearly forty, totally bald, bleary eyed, rich and famous. I have given my all to the Rock 'n' roll public. So, in gratitude, you might at least buy this record!

== Credits ==
- The original cast and Gass (UK stage version)
- Producer - Peter Knight for Jack Good Productions Ltd
- Vocal arrangements - Emil Dean Zoghby.
- Musical arrangements - John Bennett and Phil Kenzie.
- Pye Studios mobile recording - Vic Maile and Alan Florence.
- Photographs - Flair Photography.
- Inner sleeve design - Graphreaks.
- Cover design - Russell James Associates.
