= Cuddly Dudley (singer) =

British singer (1924–2011)

Background information
- Born: Dudley Bernal Bancroft Heslop; 22 May 1924; Kingston, Jamaica
- Died: 15 July 2011 (aged 87)
- Genres: Pop, rock and roll
- Occupations: Singer, actor, dancer
- Years active: 1947 – mid 1960s
- Labels: His Master's Voice, Oriole, Parlophone
- Formerly of: The Embraceable Four; The Redcaps

Dudley Bernal Bancroft Heslop (22 May 1924 – 15 July 2011) was a Jamaican-born British rock & roll singer who rose to fame on the Oh Boy! TV series, and is noted for being "Britain's first black rock & roller".

== Early career ==
Born in Kingston, Jamaica, on 22 May 1924 (although Dudley later pretended to be younger, claiming to be 29 in early 1959, while Allmusic said he was born in the 1930s) he started performing when very young with a "native song and dance act" for tourists. In 1947, he went to Britain where he spent a year in the play Sauce Tartare at the Cambridge Theatre in the West End, before singing in clubs for six months. He then played in Folies Bergeres at the Hippodrome, London and toured Australia in Cole Porter's Kiss Me, Kate, before joining Sid Milward's Comedy orchestra, The Nit Wits, supporting Max Bygraves.

By the mid-1950s Dudley was recording for Oriole Records, as part of the Charles Ross Orchestra, and adopted the nickname Cuddly Dudley, playing on his slightly round figure. He toured New Zealand and Switzerland with Charles Ross, then joined Mambo bandleader Pérez Prado to tour Italy, before returning to the West End with Plaisirs de Paris at the Prince of Wales Theatre.

Dudley was influenced by early rock 'n' roll and, being black, with a strong voice, decided to change musical style. His manager, Guy Robinson, promoted him as "Bristol's answer to The Big Bopper" and he adopted a big grin, flashy suits and snazzy ties. He was also a co-founder of The Dominoes, with pianist Iggy Quail and vocalist Boysie Grant.

Although he was little known outside Afro-Caribbean circles, within this community he was as popular as any other rock and roll performer, which led to his manager persuading Jack Good to give him a residency on Good's new TV series Oh Boy!.

== Oh Boy! ==
Dudley appeared on both pilot recordings of Oh Boy! (T1 and T2) as Dudley Heslop, but changed back to Cuddley Dudley before the main series started. He was usually backed by the house band, Lord Rockingham's XI, and appeared in a total of 21 episodes; this was the most appearances by any artist (one more than Cliff Richard, whilst The Drifters, who became The Shadows, and Marty Wilde, appeared on 17 shows each). His first recordings as Cuddly Dudley were on the TV spin-off album Oh Boy! (Parlophone, 1958), on which he sang "Hey Hey Hey Hey" (later covered by The Beatles) and "Lets Rock While the Rocking's Good". A solo single, "Later" b/w "Lots More Love", was released in 1959, and in 1960 he appeared, as himself, in the film Girls of the Latin Quarter, directed by Alfred Travers and starring Jill Ireland, which was filmed in the London branch of the nightclub Latin Quarter. He also deputised for Cliff Richard, appearing at several concerts when Richard was ill.

== Later career ==
After the demise of Oh Boy! in May 1959, he began touring with his own all-black band, The Embraceable Four, including tenor saxophonist Winston Whyte, with whom he supported The Platters on their 1960 UK tour, and released a second single, a cover of Chuck Berry's "Too Pooped To Pop".

In 1961 he became the lead singer with The Redcaps, with whom he released a single, "Sitting in a Train". Originally known as Red-E-Lewis and the Redcaps (named after Gene Vincent's The Blue Caps), original lead singer Reddy Lewis (Edward Stubbs) had left to form the Red Cats, with Jimmy Page on guitar. The Redcaps comprised Mick Green, Vic Cooper, Frank Farley, Johnny Patto and Johnny Spence, and from May to July 1961, Lewis returned, but Dudley remained lead vocalist. Farley, Patto and Spence left to become The Pirates, backing Johnny Kidd (who had the same manager as Dudley), when the original Pirates left. Green, The Redcaps other guitarist, joined the Pirates later, when Patto left.

By 1963-64, Dudley had rejoined pianist Iggy Quail and recorded some of the first bluebeat and ska tracks outside Jamaica. Dudley and Quail formed a trio with Clyde Davies (bass), who accompanied comedians such as Tommy Trinder and Bob Monkhouse and had a residency at the Kingfisher Club. Dudley released several singles on Piccadilly, as well as more for Oriole. He retired from the music business in the mid-1960s.

== Death ==
Dudley died on 15 July 2011, aged 87.

== Discography ==
Singles

- "Later" / "Lots More Love" – (1959) – His Master's Voice (POP 586)
- "Too Pooped to Pop" / "Miss In-Between" – (1960) – His Master's Voice (POP 725)
- "Sitting in a Train" / "The One That I Like" – (1961) – Ember (S136)
- "Monkey Party" / "The Ferryboat Ride" - Piccadilly 7N.35090 (1962)
- "Blarney Blues" / "Peace on Earth" – 1964 – Oriole (ICB9)
- "Way of Life" / "When Will You Say You'll Be Mine" – 1964 – Oriole (ICB10)

Compilations

- Oh Boy! (1958) Parlophone – 2 tracks:- "Hey Hey Hey Hey" and "Lets Rock While the Rocking's Good" CD (2009) Highnote (GVC1008)
- That British Sound Vol 10 – CD (2010) No Hit Records BLC 89 – 2 tracks: "Sitting in a Train" and "Later"
- From Calypso to Disco: The Roots of Black Britain – one track: "The Ferryboat Ride"
- The Piccadilly Story – (1994) & (2006) – Castle (72386) – one track: "The Ferryboat Ride"
- British Rock'n'Roll 1955~1960 CD (1986) See For Miles (SEE38) "Later" and "Lots More Love"
