= Jim! =

Studio album by Jim Dale
- Released: April 1958
- Recorded: 1958
- Studio: EMI, London
- Genre: Pop; rock and roll
- Length: 23:22
- Label: Parlophone
- Producer: George Martin

Jim Dale chronology
Jim! (1958)	Meet Jim Dale (1969)

Singles from Jim!
- 1. "Tread Softly Stranger" Released: April 1957

Jim! is the first studio album by the English actor, singer and songwriter Jim Dale, credited to Dale with Ken Jones and his Orchestra and the Michael Sammes Singers. Released as a 10-inch LP on EMI's Parlophone label in March 1958, Jim! was produced by the label's head George Martin and has been cited as "the first British rock and roll LP". It was Dale's only album released during his initial fame as a teen idol; he quit recording to pursue comedy soon after its release.

== Background ==
Jim Dale began his professional career in entertainment aged seventeen, performing as a comedian in variety theatres across the UK and Ireland. His comedy career led him to work as a warm-up act for the BBC rock and roll television programme Six-Five Special. After singing and accompanying himself on guitar during his set, Dale was asked to return the following week to perform in the programme as a singer. Several subsequent appearances brought Dale to the attention of George Martin, who signed him to Parlophone, then "the poor relation of the EMI combine, with His Master's Voice and Columbia being the big boys" according to Hi-Fi News & Record Review. Martin believed Dale to be the label's answer to Tommy Steele. (Note: Martin had missed out on signing Steele in 1956, dismissing the performer as "nothing more than a coffee bar yodeller" after hearing him. Martin instead opted to sign Steele's backing band the Vipers Skiffle Group.) Dale became Britain's first major rock and roll star since Steele when his Martin-produced recording of "Be My Girl" reached number two on the UK Singles Chart in December 1957. Martin would later reflect "there was no real rock and roll in Britain... "Be My Girl" was as near as we'd get".

As a teen idol, Dale found himself returning to the theatres he'd performed as a comedian, with "hysterical, screaming teenage girls" replacing the family audiences. Dale later recalled "I just didn't like it. I had girls sleeping on my doorstep outside my house, and my wife just hated the idea of that". Despite his musical success, he was vocal about still yearning to be a star comedian, something that frustrated Martin. (Note: When asked who he'd most like to record a duet with in a New Musical Express feature, Dale chose "either Peter Sellers or Spike Milligan, because that would lead to a lot of fun and I could break away from the normal run of things for a while".) Interviewed by Evening Sentinel in April 1958, Dale commented "A singer's life is short. But look at the comedians who have lasted. I want to be an all-round entertainer. Max Bygraves is the ideal examples - a comedian who sings." Though Dale continued to appear frequently on Six-Five Special whilst recording for Parlophone, concert appearances as a singer were limited; over 1957 and 1958, he was engaged as compère for Stanley Dale's National Skiffle Contest, a lengthy UK tour headlined by the Vipers Skiffle Group and supported by battles between local groups. The format of the tour allowed Dale to "go on in a lounge suit, crack a few gags and introduce another act", something he accepted may "shock" his teenage fans but "to the mums and dads it shows I'm no sequined rock and roll monster".

== Contents ==
Jim! features a variety of musical styles, reflecting Dale's desire to become an all-round entertainer. According to Jackie Moore of Disc, "Crazy For You" and "I Sit in My Window" most resemble the style of Dale's hit singles, whilst the "oldie" "Kisses Sweeter than Wine" "is more the kind of song that Jim sang for pleasure, in the days before he became a top selling disc star". Among the album's remaining tracks are versions of the jazz standards "Undecided" and "'Tain't What You Do", both with big band backing. "Tread Softly Stranger", the theme for the 1958 crime film of the same name, was described by the New Musical Express as "quiet and melodious... ...reminiscent of a cowboy idling along on his horse, singing dreamily to the strains of his own guitar". Dale wrote the album's only self-penned track, the upbeat "Jane Belinda", in tribute to his daughter, Belinda Jane, who was born in January 1958. According to Manchester Evening News, the song incorporates both rock and roll and Latin rhythms.

Jim! was produced by George Martin and recorded at EMI Studios in under a day in 1958. It has been cited by Mark Lewisohn as "the first British rock and roll LP", though it is predated by Tommy Steele's Tommy Steele Stage Show and the soundtrack for The Tommy Steele Story (both 1957).

== Release and reception ==
Jim! was issued as a 10-inch LP on Parlophone in April 1958. The album failed to chart upon release. A single, "Tread Softly Stranger" backed with "Jane Belinda", was released in April 1957. Despite publicity generated by the subject matter of "Jane Belinda", the single failed to chart. The album's ten tracks were released on CD in 2009 on Pink 'N' Black Records' compilation "The Early Years", and in 2021 as part of Jasmine's "Be My Girl, the Rockin' Years".

Among contemporary reviews, Benny Lee of Nottingham Evening News deemed Jim! "a 'first' in every sense - ten tracks with an exciting beat on every one". He praised the album's variety and described "Tread Softly Stranger" and "Jane Belinda" as "both first rate". Writing for Melody Maker, Laurie Henshaw commented that the album "should find a ready response" and singled out "Jane Belinda" as a highspot. Jackie Moore of Disc cited "I'm in the Market for You", "Undecided" and "'Tain't What You Do" as highlights of the "versatile" album, but noted "I think he still has a lot to learn when it comes straight ballads like "Tread Softly Stranger" - the lyrics don't seem to mean very much yet".

== Track listing ==
Side one
No.	Title	Writer(s)	Length
1.	"The Story of My Life"	Burt Bacharach, Hal David	2:19
2.	"I'm in the Market for You"	Joseph McCarthy, James F. Hanley	1:47
3.	"Tread Softly Stranger"	Richard Dix, Jack Fishman	2:06
4.	"Crazy For You"	Robertson, Paul	2:02
5.	"Undecided"	Charlie Shavers, Sid Robin	1:58

Side two
No.	Title	Writer(s)	Length
1.	"I Sit in My Window"	Otis Blackwell	2:16
2.	"Song of the Pine Trees"	Robertson, Paul	3:08
3.	"Kisses Sweeter Than Wine"	Campbell, Newman	3:04
4.	"Jane Belinda"	Jim Dale	2:19
5.	"'Tain't What You Do"	Sy Oliver, Trummy Young	2:23
