= Lord Rockingham's XI =

British group of session musicians

- Lord Rockingham's XI

Background information
- Origin: England
- Genres: Rock
- Years active: 1958–1959
- Label: Decca
- Past members: Harry Robinson; Benny Green; Cherry Wainer; Don Storer; Reg Weller; Red Price; Rex Morris; Cyril Reubens; Ronnie Black; Bernie Taylor; Eric Ford; Kenny Packwood; Ian Fraser

Lord Rockingham's XI was a group of British session musicians, led by Harry Robinson (1932–1996), who had a No. 1 hit on the UK Singles Chart in 1958 with "Hoots Mon".

The group was created to perform as the resident band on the pop TV programme Oh Boy!, which was produced by Jack Good, and shown nationally on Britain's ITV network during 1958/59. (The Roman numeral XI, pronounced eleven, relates to the number of players in a cricket team.) They were fronted by Harry Robinson and also included jazz baritone saxophonist (later writer/broadcaster) Benny Green, and organist Cherry Wainer. Other members were Wainer's husband Don Storer (drums), Reg Weller (percussion), Red Price (tenor sax), Rex Morris (tenor sax), Cyril Reubens (baritone sax), Ronnie Black (double bass), Bernie Taylor (guitar), Eric Ford (guitar). Joining the group later were Kenny Packwood (guitar) and Ian Fraser (piano).

In addition to backing singers such as Marty Wilde and Cuddly Dudley, they recorded several novelty rock instrumentals for Decca Records, the first being "Fried Onions", which failed to chart in the UK but did slip into the US Billboard charts for a week at No. 96. The second single, Robinson's "Hoots Mon", a rocked-up version of the traditional Scottish song "A Hundred Pipers", featuring cod Scotticisms like "Hoots mon, there's a moose loose aboot this hoose!", rose up the charts supported by weekly TV exposure, and stayed at number one for three weeks. They played "Long John" among others.

Following a legal case brought by descendants of the real Lord Rockingham, which was settled out of court, the group toured and made several less successful follow-ups, including "Wee Tom" (No. 16, 1959). They disbanded with the end of the TV show in 1959, although the name was revived for a couple of albums in the 1960s. Harry Robinson's career in TV and music continued, one notable credit being for his string arrangement on Nick Drake's track "River Man".

"Fried Onions" was used in a television advertisement for Options indulgence chocolate drink, first shown on UK TV in December 2011.

Cherry Wainer died in Las Vegas, Nevada, United States, on 14 November 2014, at the age of 79.

== Discography ==
=== Albums ===
- The Return of Lord Rockingham (Columbia, 1968)
- Jack Good Presents Lord Rockingham's XI (Stylus, 2002)
- Decca Singles Compilation (Vocalion, 2005)

=== Singles ===
Year	Single	Peak chart positions		
Year	Single	NOR	UK	US
1958	"The Squelch" b/w "Fried Onions"	—	—	— 96
1958	"Hoots Mon" b/w "Blue Train"	10	1	—
1959	"Wee Tom" b/w "Lady Rockingham, I Presume?"	—	16	—
1959	"Ra-Ra Rockingham" b/w "Farewell to Rockingham"	—	—	—
1962	"Newcastle Twist" b/w "Rockingham Twist"	—	—	—
1976	"Hoots Mon" (1st re-release) b/w "Blue Train"	—	—	—
1982	"Hoots Mon!" (2nd re-release) b/w "Blue Train"	—	—	—
1993	"Hoots Mon" (3rd re-release) b/w "Blue Train"/"Wee Tom"	—	60	—
"—" denotes releases that did not chart or were not released.

== See also ==
- List of artists under the Decca Records label
- List of artists who reached number one on the UK Singles Chart
