= Juju (Gass album) =

Album by Gass

Juju (aka "Gass")

Studio album by Gass
- Released: 1970
- Recorded: 1970
- Genre: Rock
- Label: Polydor
- Producer: Mel Collins (for Active Records Ltd)

Gass chronology
Juju (aka "Gass") (1970)	Catch My Soul (1971)

Juju side 'A' (original label)

Studio album

Juju (1970) was the first album recorded by the rock band Gass and featured guitarist Peter Green, who had just left Fleetwood Mac at this time. The album was released by Polydor (catalogue reference 283-022 A) and withdrawn soon after it was distributed to retail outlets then re-issued using the same catalogue number and entitled Gass

== Track listing ==
1. "Kulu Se Mama" (McClean, Harper, Tench) - 7:00
2. "Holy Woman" (McClean, Harper, Tench) - 5:36
3. "Yes I Can" (McClean, Harper, Tench) - 6:43
4. "Juju" (McClean, Harper, Tench) - 3:31
5. "Black Velvet" (McClean, Harper, Tench) - 3:41
6. "House for Sale" (McClean, Harper, Tench) - 3:39
7. "Cold Light of Day" (Derek Austin) - 4:04
8. "Cool Me Down" (McClean, Harper, Tench) - 6:03

Track times are included on the German issue of this album (Polydor 2383 022).

== Personnel ==
- Robert Tench - vocals, percussion; guitar on "Holy Woman"; organ solo on "Kulu Se Mama"
- Michael Piggott - violin, guitar
- Derek Austin - organ, piano, flute, percussion
- Delisle Harper - electric and acoustic basses, percussion
- Godfrey McLean - drums, percussion, congas; vocals on "Yes I Can" and "Cool Me Down"

Other musicians

- Junior Kerr - guitar
- Errol McLean - congas
- Humphrey Okah - saxophone
- Alan Roskans - lead guitar
- Frank Clark - organ
- Peter Green - guitar (on "Juju" and "Black Velvet")
