= Patricia Owens =

Canadian-British actress (1925–2000)

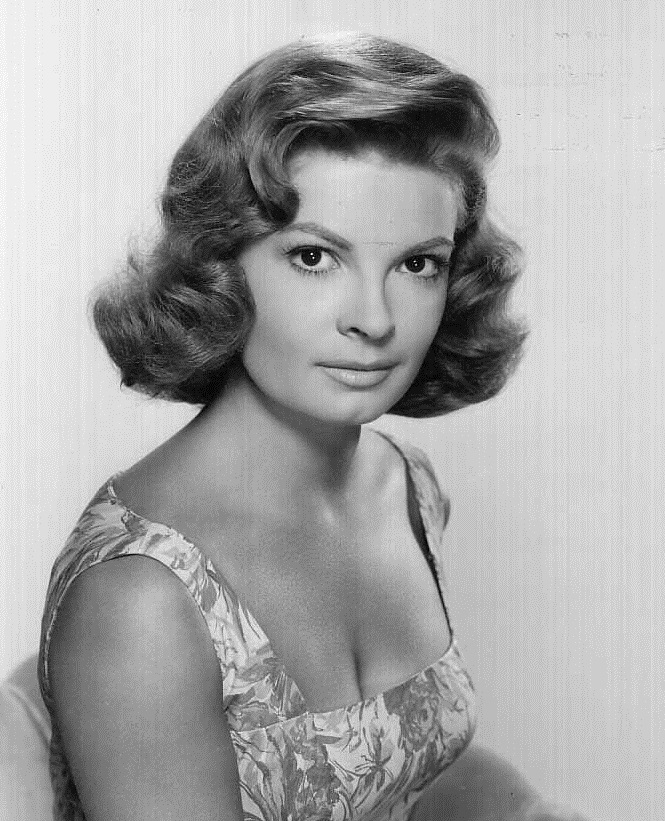
- Owens in 1958
- Born: 17 January 1925; Golden, British Columbia, Canada
- Died: 31 August 2000 (aged 75); Lancaster, California, U.S.
- Other names: Pat Owens; Patricia Owen
- Occupation: Actress
- Years active: 1943–1968
- Spouses: Sy Bartlett (m. 1956; div. 1958) Jerome Nathanson (m. 1960; div. 1961) John Austin (m. 1969; div. 1975)
- Children: 1
- Father: Arthur Owens

Patricia Molly Owens (January 17, 1925 – August 31, 2000) was a Canadian-British actress.

== Early life ==
Owens was born in Golden, British Columbia in 1925. Her family moved to England when she was eight-years-old, where Owens was raised.

Her father was Arthur Owens, a notorious German-and-British double agent during the Second World War who operated under the codename "Snow". The elder Owens, who ran a company building ship batteries, had been recruited by the Abwehr in 1938. Upon the outbreak of World War II, he offered his services to Special Branch, but was initially imprisoned for espionage, before being recruited by MI5 to act as a double agent.

As an adult, Patricia would downplay her relation to her father, who moved to Dublin with a new wife in 1948, where he would remain until his death in 1957.

== Career ==
Owens moved from Canada to England as a child. At 18, she made her motion-picture debut in the musical comedy Miss London Ltd. The following year, she had a small role in Harold French's social satire English Without Tears. Her career continued in this manner for a few years, Owens getting ever-larger roles in movies.

Her career received a boost when she was seen by a 20th Century Fox executive while performing in a stage production of Sabrina Fair, and was offered a screen test. The result was a contract with the studio and a move to Hollywood. Her first American film was Island in the Sun (1957), followed by No Down Payment, both for Fox, after which Owens was lent to Warner Bros. to star (second-billed below Marlon Brando) in the critically-acclaimed romantic drama Sayonara (1957).

Owens spent the rest of 1957 working mostly on loan, but a successful Fox production secured her best known role, as Hélène Delambre, the wife of scientist André Delambre in The Fly (1958). Owens carried much of that horror film's narrative, which was largely presented in flashback from her character's point of view.

None of Owens' subsequent films ever attained the same level of success as The Fly. She co-starred in the 1960 war film Hell to Eternity, then in 1961 appeared in the threadbare, backlot P.O.W./jungle chase drama Seven Women from Hell. Owens made occasional television appearances, on series such as Perry Mason and Burke's Law, but these were relatively infrequent. Owens starred in the 1959 episode "The Crystal Trench" of the series Alfred Hitchcock Presents. She was also in an episode of Tales of Wells Fargo titled "Assignment In Gloribee" in 1962. She plays an uptight, cynical Bostonian who is sent out west to write a "favorable" review of the west, on behalf of Wells Fargo.

By 1965, Owens was working in Black Spurs, a B-Western produced by A. C. Lyles, who was renowned for using older stars in that genre. She retired from feature films in 1968 after portraying the love interest in the low-budget espionage thriller The Destructors. Later that same year, she made her last professional appearance in a televised episode of Lassie.

== Personal life ==
Owens was married and divorced three times. Her first husband, producer and screenwriter Sy Bartlett, and she were wed in 1956 and remained together for two years. She next married Jerome Nathanson in 1960, and they had one child before their divorce in 1961. Her third marriage was to John Austin from 1969 until their divorce in 1975.

=== Death ===
Owens died in Lancaster, California on August 31, 2000, aged 75.

== Filmography ==
=== Film ===
Year	Title	Role	Director	Notes
1943	Miss London Ltd.	Miss London	Val Guest	Uncredited
1944	English Without Tears	Girl Getting Autograph	Harold French	Uncredited
1944	Give Us the Moon	Chambermaid	Val Guest	Uncredited
1944	One Exciting Night	Bit part	Walter Forde	Uncredited
1947	While the Sun Shines	Bit part	Anthony Asquith	Uncredited
1948	Things Happen at Night		Francis Searle	
1948	Panic at Madame Tussaud's	Phyllis Edwards	Peter Graham Scott	
1949	Paper Orchid	Mary MacSweeney	Roy Ward Baker	
1950	Bait	Anna Hastings	Frank Richardson	Credited as 'Patricia Owen'
1950	The Happiest Days of Your Life	Angela Parry	Frank Launder	Credited as 'Pat Owens'
1950	Old Mother Riley Headmistress	Girl	John Harlow	Credited as 'Pat Owens'
1951	Mystery Junction	Mabel Dawn	Michael McCarthy	Credited as 'Pat Owens'
1952	Crow Hollow	Willow	Michael McCarthy	Credited as 'Pat Owens'
1952	Ghost Ship	Joyce	Vernon Sewell	
1953	House of Blackmail	Joan	Maurice Elvey	
1953	Knights of the Round Table	Lady Vivien	Richard Thorpe	Uncredited
1954	The Good Die Young	Winnie	Lewis Gilbert	Uncredited
1954	A Stranger Came Home	Blonde	Terence Fisher	Credited as 'Pat Owens'
1954	Tale of Three Women	Mary	Paul Dickson	Segment: "Final Twist"
1955	Windfall	Connie Lee	Henry Cass	
1957	Alive on Saturday	Sally Parker	Alfred Travers	
1957	Island in the Sun	Sylvia Fleury	Robert Rossen	
1957	No Down Payment	Jean Martin	Martin Ritt	
1957	Sayonara	Eileen Webster	Joshua Logan	
1958	The Law and Jake Wade	Peggy	John Sturges	
1958	The Fly	Hélène Delambre	Kurt Neumann	
1958	The Gun Runners	Lucy Martin	Don Siegel	
1959	These Thousand Hills	Joyce	Richard Fleischer	
1959	Five Gates to Hell	Joy	James Clavell	
1960	Hell to Eternity	Sheila Lincoln	Phil Karlson	
1961	Seven Women from Hell	Grace Ingram	Robert D. Webb	
1961	X-15	Margaret Brandon	Richard Donner	
1964	Walk a Tightrope	Ellen Sheppard	Frank Nesbitt	
1965	Black Spurs	Clare Grubbs	R. G. Springsteen	
1968	The Destructors	Charlie	Francis D. Lyon	

=== Television ===
Year	Title	Role	Notes
1955	London Playhouse	Mary	Episode: "The Inward Eye"
1956	Colonel March of Scotland Yard	Betty Hartley	Episode: "The New Invisible Man"
1959	Alfred Hitchcock Presents	Stella Ballister	Episode: "The Crystal Trench"
1959	Adventures in Paradise	Rusty Haynes	Episode: "The Raft"
1960	Alcoa Theatre	Kay Armory White	Episode: "Action Off Screen"
1961	Follow the Sun	Margaret Jackson	Episode: "Another Part of the Jungle"
1962	Tales of Wells Fargo	Katherine Anne Murdock	Episode: "Assignment in Gloribee"
1962	Bus Stop	Connie Brooke	Episode: "The Ordeal of Kevin Brooke"
1963	The Untouchables	Marcy Devon	Episode: "The Charlie Argos Story"
1964	Gunsmoke	Nora	Episode: "Scot Free"
1966	Burke's Law	Sharon O'Brien	2 episodes
1966	Perry Mason	June Burgess	Episode: "The Case of the Avenging Angel"
1968	Lassie	Linda Monroe	Episode: "Lassie's Race for Life"

== Partial stage credits ==
- Pick-Up Girl (1946, Prince of Wales Theatre and Hippodrome, London) - Mary (replacement)
- Second Threshold (1952, Theatre Royal, Brighton and Vaudeville Theatre, London) - Thankful Mather
