= Harry Robertson (musician) =

Scottish musician (1932–1996)

- Harry Robertson c.1959

Background information
- Also known as: Lord Rockingham, Harry Robinson
- Born: Henry MacLeod Robertson; 19 November 1932; Elgin, Moray, Scotland
- Died: 17 January 1996 (aged 63) London, England
- Occupations: Musician, bandleader, music director, composer
- Years active: 1950s–1990s

Henry MacLeod Robertson (19 November 1932 – 17 January 1996), often credited as Harry Robinson, was a Scottish musician, bandleader, music director and composer. He worked as a musical director on British television shows in the 1950s and 1960s, and also arranged for theatre shows and films, notably those of the Hammer production company.

== Early life ==
He was the son of Henry Robertson of Elgin, Morayshire, Scotland. He learned piano, but then determined to become an archaeologist, studying the subject at university before giving up his academic studies because of his poor health, and becoming a music teacher in London.

== Career ==
He started working occasionally as an arranger for Decca Records, before becoming the musical director for Tommy Steele. He explained that in the late 1950s he began using the name Robinson, as well as Robertson, in his professional activities:

"It was whilst working at Decca that I had to change my name. This was because the cheque that they paid me with was made out to HARRY ROBINSON and not Robertson. It would have been a nightmare to try and change it and the bank would have been difficult, so out of laziness I suppose I opened an account in the name of Robinson. And that’s how Harry Robinson came about..."

Robertson was the musical director of the British television pop music programmes, Six-Five Special (1957 BBC) and Oh Boy! (1959 ITV). He was responsible for writing and producing the pop song "Hoots Mon" (not so much a song, more an instrumental take on "A Hundred Pipers" with spoken interjections in a mock Scottish accent) by Lord Rockingham's XI, which stayed at Number 1 on the UK Singles Chart for three weeks in 1958.

He arranged and conducted the stage shows Fings Ain't Wot They Used T'Be (1960) and Maggie May (1964) and also co-wrote the West End hit musical Elvis. Robinson was the conductor for the United Kingdom entry in the 1961 Eurovision Song Contest. He also wrote the string arrangements for English folk singers, such as Nick Drake (notably, "River Man", from Drake's debut album Five Leaves Left) and Sandy Denny, mostly notably the seven-minute "All Our Days" from her 1977 album Rendezvous.

In 1968, he wrote the theme tune for a TV series, Journey to the Unknown, produced by Hammer Film Productions. He then began scoring films for the company. Robertson was the composer, arranger or screenwriter of these films and others:

- The File of the Golden Goose (1969)
- The Oblong Box (1969)
- Arthur? Arthur! (1969)
- The Vampire Lovers (1970)
- Countess Dracula (1971)
- Lust for a Vampire (1971)
- Fright (1971)
- Demons of the Mind (1972)
- Twins of Evil (1972)
- The Best Pair of Legs in the Business (1973)
- The House in Nightmare Park (1973)
- Hijack! (1975)
- Legend of the Werewolf (1975)
- The Ghoul (1975)
- Not Now, Comrade (1976)
- There Goes the Bride (1980)

Robertson also produced and composed the music of Hawk the Slayer (1980), Prisoners of the Lost Universe (1982) and Jane and the Lost City (1988), co-writing the script of the first two. He wrote a number of film scripts, television series and books, including The Electric Eskimo, The Boy Who Never Was, Sammy's Super T-Shirt. He created and wrote the music for the TV series Virtual Murder.

== Personal life and death ==
He married Ziki Arbuthnot, who inherited the Wharton Barony in 1990. They had four children, the eldest of whom, Myles, is now the 12th Baron.

Harry Robertson died in London in 1996.
