= The Gass =

British progressive rock band

- Also known as: Gass
- Origin: UK
- Genre: Progressive rock
- Years active: 1965–1971
- Labels: Polydor, CBS, Parlophone
- Past members: Robert Tench; Godfrey McLean; Delisle Harper; Derek Austin; Michael Piggott; Alan Roskans; Frank Clark; Humphrey Okan; Errol McLean

The Gass was a rock band formed in May 1965 by Robert Tench, Godfrey McLean, and Errol McLean. They were managed by Rik Gunnell and Active Management. The band fused melodies with soul, Latin influences, blues and progressive rock often employing complex rhythms with an eclectic mix of other influences.

== History ==
=== 1960s-1969 ===
After forming in the early 1960s as The Senators then becoming the Creators they became known as The Gass in 1965 with the original line up of Robert Tench as bass player and lead vocalist, percussionist Errol McLean with his brother drummer and vocalist Godfrey McLean. Saxophonist Humphrey Oka and guitarist Alan Roskams were also added to the lineup. Tench soon began contributing guitar and keyboard parts as well. As their music progressed the line up changed and between 1965 and 1967 they released singles on the Parlophone and CBS labels.

The band played at clubs and venues throughout the UK and at fashionable music venues in London's Soho such as The Ad Lib club, The Flamingo and the Bag O'Nails. Eric Burdon sang with them at The Scotch of St James where they were employed as the house band and Jimi Hendrix jammed with them. During 1968 they were supporting bands such as Led Zeppelin who were billed as The Yardbirds for their first UK appearance on 25 October that year at Surrey University. In 1969 they became the house band for the rock musical Catch My Soul-Rock Othello produced by Jack Good and their participation was billed as 'music interpreted by Gass'.

=== 1970-1971 ===
By this period the band were known simply as Gass and they released their first album Juju (1970) which featured guitarist Peter Green. In the same year Godfrey McLean appeared on Peter Green's End of the Game (1970). Gass were also featured on the album Catch My Soul (1971), which was recorded with the original cast of the UK stage production of Catch My Soul-Rock Othello.

In 1971 the band recorded the single "Something's Got To Change Your Ways" which was released the Polydor label. Pete Masden mentions in his book Funk guitar and Bass, that during this period Godfrey McLean and Tench performed at regular jam sessions with other musicians at Ronnie Scott's club. These sessions led to an embryonic line up for the fusion band Gonzalez.

=== Post disbanding ===
In May 1971 Tench joined The Jeff Beck Group and Gass finally disbanded. Godfrey McLean recorded with Brian Auger and The Oblivion Express. Delisle Harper who was the band's bass player in a later lineup appeared with Tench on Freddie King's Burglar (1974) also Larger than Life (1975). Roskams moved on to work with Herbie Goins.

== Band members ==
1969-1971

- Robert Tench-vocsls,guitar and organ
- Godfrey McLean-drums, congas, vocals and percussion
- Delisle Harper-bass and percussion
- Derek Austin-organ, piano, flute and percussion
- Michael Piggott-violin and guitar

1965-1969

- Robert Tench-bass, guitar, organ and vocals
- Godfrey McLean-drums, congas, vocals and percussion
- Alan Roskams-lead guitar (left in 1967)
- Stuart Cowell-lead guitar (left in 1967)
- Frank Clark-Organ
- Humphrey Okan-Saxophone
- Errol McLean-Congas

== Discography ==
Albums

- Supergroups Vol. 2 (1970) (track 1: "Black Velvet" featuring Peter Green).
- Juju featuring Peter Green Polydor 2485 003 (1970). Re-released as Gass in the same year with the same personnel, track listing and catalogue number.
- Catch My Soul Polydor 2383 035 (1971)

Singles as The Gass

- "One Of These Days"/"I Don't Know Why" Parlophone R 5344 (1965)
- "The New Breed"/"In The City" Parlophone R 5456 (1966)
- "Dream Baby (How Long Must I Dream)"/"Jitterbug Sid" CBS 2647 (1967)
- "Something's Got To Change Your Ways"/"Mr. Banana" Polydor 2058 147 (1971)
