= Stanley Dale's National Skiffle Contest =

- Tour by the Vipers Skiffle Group and Jim Dale
- 1957 poster for the contest at Moss Empire theatre, Leeds
- Location: United Kingdom
- Start date: 16 September 1957
- End date: 23 August 1958

Stanley Dale's National Skiffle Contest toured the United Kingdom over 1957 and 1958. Headlined by the Vipers Skiffle Group and compèred by teen idol Jim Dale, the shows were based around a battle of the bands between local skiffle groups at each venue, with an advance to a promised television appearance for the winning acts. Twenty-one of the amateur groups appeared on the BBC's pop music programme Six-Five Special from February to August 1958. The final three competitors were the Woodlanders of Plymouth, the Saxons of Barking and the Double Three of Bury St Edmunds. No winner was officially announced.

== Background and format ==
Manager and promoter Stanley Dale of Associated London Scripts devised the National Skiffle Contest (Note: The contest was alternatively titled The Great National Skiffle Contest, or Stanley Dale's National Skiffle Show of 1958 for its later dates.) to take advantage of the skiffle craze that followed the 1956 success of Lonnie Donegan's "Rock Island Line". Small skiffle contests had become commonplaces in the United Kingdom and a similar touring talent show concept had previously been successful for Carroll Levis. Dale told the media, "Skiffle may or may not be music, but I do know it is good entertainment and the sort of entertainment Joe Public wants to see".

The contest took the form of a touring show that would visit theatres and concert halls in several major towns and cities in the United Kingdom. Preliminary auditions for local amateur skiffle groups would be held on a Sunday. Selected groups (usually five or six) would then compete in three weekday heats on Monday, Tuesday and Wednesday. The semi-final would be held on Thursday and the final on Friday, with the winner decided by audience reaction. This element was advantageous for acts with a large local following, but backfired on some dates when some acts "were so bad that the audience laughed their heads off", according to the New Musical Express. The winning act would appear in the town's main Saturday presentation on a bill with professional acts. They would also receive a £30 cash prize, with a promised advance to two semi-finals and a final with a £250 cash prize. Dale believed parents would leave the shows with "a far better understanding of the noise the kids have been making in the kitchen or back yard".

The shows were headlined by The Vipers Skiffle Group, whose style "all provincials sought to emulate", according to Pete Frame. The group typically performed each night of the week alongside the amateur acts. Their leader Wally Whyton considered the tour "all a big con", later commenting that "Stanley Dale was only interested in getting the maximum number of punters into the theatre; musical ability had nothing to do with it". Dale installed his artist Jim Dale, a teen idol who recorded for Parlophone, as the tour's compère. The singer saw the tour as an opportunity to diversify his act and to become an all-round entertainer. The shows allowed him "go on in a lounge suit, crack a few gags and introduce another act", something he accepted may "shock" his teenage fans but "to the mums and dads it shows I'm no sequined rock and roll monster". Jazz singer Cab Kaye appeared on some dates, alongside a number of traditional variety acts including Jimmy Edmundson, Stan Van "the Zany Man" and Campbell & Rogerson. The tour provided some support for the struggling music hall tradition, leading to praise from The Stage, whose anonymous writer commented that "variety needs some new blood and this is a healthy way of getting it."

== Contest ==
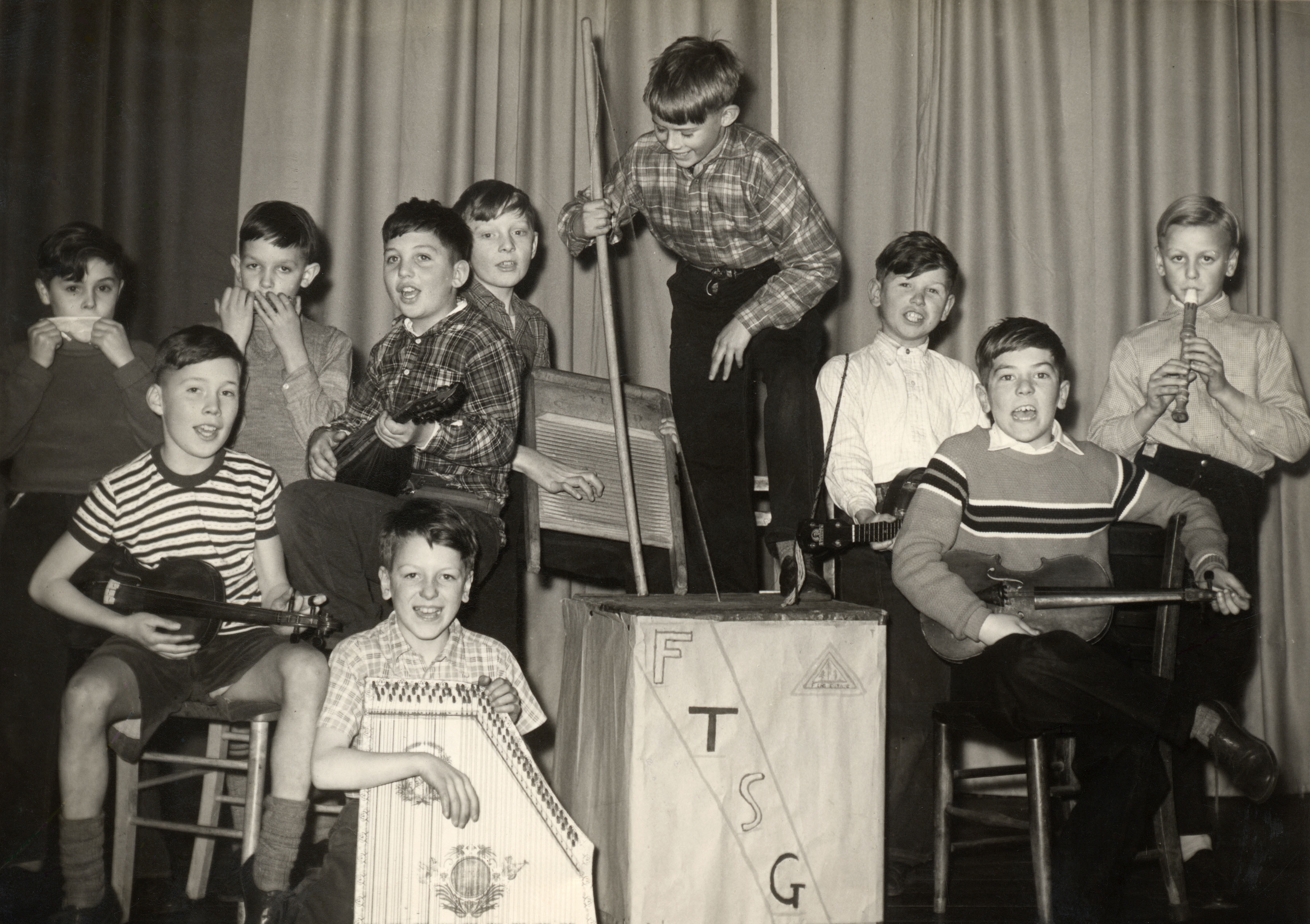
An amateur skiffle group of schoolchildren in Derby, England

Following pilot shows in Reading and Ramsgate, Stanley Dale's National Skiffle Contest tour began in Nottingham in September 1957. Initially, no date was set for the final of the contest, which music journalist Pete Frame has described as an "interminable, enervating slog around the country". It was highly successful, with Stanley Dale noting that "it is not only boys who make these groups, there are a great number of girls joining in". Publicity for the shows promised a "major film in active preparation" and "the best groups to be included on a Parlophone long play record for release in April", neither of which ultimately materialised. In January 1958, it was announced that the contest's final rounds would be broadcast on television in editions of the BBC's teen-oriented music programme Six-Five Special. Stanley Dale had negotiated a deal with the show's producer Jack Good, to the dismay of co-producer Dennis Main Wilson, who disliked skiffle and considered the contest "phoney". (Note: Good and Main Wilson produced the programme on alternate weeks.)

As the contest continued, the skiffle boom began to reach its end. At the beginning of 1958, the Vipers Skiffle Group changed their name to the Vipers (sometimes billed as Wally Whyton and the Vipers) and were becoming weary of the repetitive nature of the tour and the discipline required for it. Wally Whyton later recounted "practically every group would have a go at 'Don't You Rock Me Daddy-O' – and then, at the end, we would have to sing it too." Several 1958 contest entrants did not consider themselves skiffle acts; The Johnny Spencer Skiffle Group, who won the Bristol heat, told the press they preferred to specialise in rock and roll and adapting older melodies. By February 1958, Pete Murray, host of Six-Five Special, noted a trend of groups wishing to "play down that word skiffle", considering it limiting.

The contest's fortnightly feature on Six-Five Special began on 1 February 1958. Jim Dale would introduce winning acts from different towns and viewers would vote for their favourite by postcard. Twenty-one groups ultimately appeared on the programme from February to August 1958. The contest's final three competitors were the Woodlanders of Plymouth, the Saxons of Barking and the Double Three of Bury St Edmunds. The three bands performed in a television final on 23 August 1958, with the winner said to be announced on 6 September 1958. Sources conflict on whether the final result was made public at the time. In a 1997 interview, members of the Saxons said they'd come second to the Woodlanders in the contest. (Note: The Woodlanders' victory is supported by Spencer Leigh and Billy Bragg.)

== Legacy ==
The contest has been cited as a precursor to the television talent show The X Factor. According to Billy Bragg, the "obviously exploitative" contest "blooded a new generation of amateur musicians who were able to get a shot at national recognition without having to surrender their personalities to the demands of music business impresarios such as Larry Parnes".

Some of the contest's competitors later became recording artists. Three Bury St Edmunds finalists – the 2.19, Station and Delta Skiffle Groups – recorded for Esquire in 1957, featuring on a 10" LP titled The First National Skiffle Contest. After meeting Joe Meek, the Station Skiffle Group changed their name to Jimmy Miller and the Barbecues and recorded two Columbia singles with the producer. The Imps, a vocal group of five 12-year-old boys, were spotted by Stanley Dale during the contest's week in Manchester and signed by George Martin. They released one single on Parlophone, "Let Me Lie", in February 1958. The Raving Texans competed in the contest's Liverpool heat and got through to the local final, losing to the Darktown Skiffle Group. The Raving Texans later became known as Rory Storm and the Hurricanes in a lineup featuring Ringo Starr.

== Partial list of tour dates ==
Dates	City	Country	Venue	Winners
16 – 21 September 1957	Nottingham	England	Empire	The Casanova Skiffle Group
23 – 28 September 1957	Sheffield	England	Empire	The Moonshiners
30 September – 5 October 1957	Leeds	England	Palace	The Rebels
7 – 12 October 1957	Leicester	England	Empire	The Black Cats
4 – 9 November 1957	Chiswick	England	Empire	The Alley-Cats
11 – 16 November 1957	Manchester	England	Hippodrome	The Wild Five
9 – 14 December 1957	Birmingham	England	Hippodrome	The Six Thunders
16 – 21 December 1957	Barking	England	Odeon	The Saxons
3 – 8 February 1958	Glasgow	Scotland	Empire Theatre	The Teenage Vipers
10 – 15 February 1958	Elephant and Castle	England	Trocadero Super Cinema	The Vikings
17 – 22 February 1958	Newcastle upon Tyne	England	Empire Palace Theatre	The Sinners
3 – 8 March 1958	Liverpool	England	Empire Theatre	The Darktown Skiffle Group
10 – 15 March 1958	Bradford	England	The Gaumont	The Sidewinders
17 – 22 March 1958	Colchester	England	Hippodrome	The Double Three
31 March – 5 April 1958	Cardiff	Wales	New Theatre	The Denson Boys
7 – 12 April 1958	Plymouth	England	Palace Theatre	The Woodlanders
21 – 26 April 1958	London	England	Metropolitan Theatre	The Station Group
28 April – 3 May 1958	Bristol	England	Hippodrome	The Johnny Spencer Skiffle Group
