= Benny Green (saxophonist) =

British saxophonist, writer, and broadcaster

- Born: Bernard Green; 9 December 1927; Leeds, Yorkshire
- Died: 22 June 1998 (aged 70) Brompton, London
- Genre: Jazz
- Occupations: Musician, writer, broadcaster
- Instrument: Saxophone

Bernard "Benny" Green (9 December 1927 – 22 June 1998) was a British jazz saxophonist who was also known for his radio shows and books.

== Early life ==
His parents were David and Fanny Green. David was a tailor and saxophonist. They met while David was playing with a band in Leeds. They married in London in 1926 and initially lived with David's father, an immigrant Russian-Jewish tailor, at 1 Greenwell Street, London. Benny Green was born in Leeds because his mother wanted to be near her own family for the birth, but they soon returned to London, to a basement flat in Cleveland Street. Here he became a musician, writer and broadcaster.

He was educated at Clipstone Street Junior Mixed School and St Marylebone Grammar School.

== Career ==
As a saxophonist, he worked in the bands of Ralph Sharon (1952), Ronnie Scott (1952), Stan Kenton (February 1956) and Dizzy Reece (1957). In 1955 he began writing a weekly column for the New Musical Express. In 1958, he appeared in the UK singles chart as a member of Lord Rockingham's XI, the house band on ITV's rock 'n' roll show Oh Boy! The novelty jazz/rock release "Hoots Mon", complete with spoken interjections in a broad mock-Scots accent, reached number 1 for three weeks in November and December. Benny later joked that wearing dark glasses whilst playing (to counteract the strong studio lights) generated a fan letter addressed to "the blind sax-player".

His BBC Radio 2 Sunday afternoon record show ran for many years until his death. He had a huge knowledge of music he liked, by classic "Great American Songbook" composers such as Jerome Kern and Cole Porter and jazz, and would introduce most records with details about the artist(s).

He also chaired a radio comedy panel game broadcast regularly on Radio 2 and the BBC World Service for 20 years; Jazz Score. Many jazz artists appeared on this show, stopping the contest to tell their own anecdotes about their career and other jazz musicians.

He first worked for the BBC in 1955 and worked regularly for it from then on. In the 1960s, he often appeared with, among others, Alan Brien, Dee Wells and Robert Pitman, on Three After Six, Associated Rediffusion's early evening television discussion programme on current affairs. His film Girls Wanted – Istanbul, for Granada TV, was nominated for the1970 BAFTA awards. Green presented a documentary film for Thames Television titled "London – Not Quite the Place it Was" first broadcast in September 1975. In the 1980s, he contributed occasionally to Stop The Week, Robert Robinson's Saturday discussion programme on Radio 4. Green also wrote and/or narrated many radio documentaries about stage and film musical stars and Hollywood, his other main interest apart from jazz and sport. He also wrote for magazines, including as film critic for Punch between 1972 and 1979, and regularly for newspapers; for 19 years he was jazz critic at The Observer. He was a big fan of writer P. G. Wodehouse, about whom he wrote a literary biography (1981).

Away from jazz he is notable for publishing the Wisden Anthologies, a summary of the famous cricketing annual, between 1979 and 1983. The four volumes covered the highlights from Wisden Cricketers' Almanack from its inception in 1864 until 1982 and stand as a major milestone in cricketing literature.

Benny Green married Antoinette Kanal in 1962, and had three sons and one daughter. One son, Dominic Green, is a guitarist who has published a book about his father; Benny Green Words and Music (2003). Another, Leo Green, has followed in his father's footsteps as a highly regarded saxophonist and, more recently, Radio 2 broadcaster.

Green died on 22 June 1998 at the age of 70 of cancer at the Royal Marsden Hospital in Brompton, London.

== Bibliography ==
Works by Benny Green include:

- The Reluctant Art: The Growth of Jazz (1963)
- Blame It on My Youth (1967)
- Jazz Decade: London (1969)
- Fifty-Eight Minutes to London (1969)
- Girls Wanted – Istanbul (1969)
- Drums in My Ears (1973)
- Swingtime in Tottenham (1976)
- I've Lost My Little Willie!: A Celebration of Comic Postcards (1976)
- The Cricket Addict's Archive (1977) (edited)
- Shaw's Champions: The Noble Art from Cashel Byron to Gene Tunney (1978)
- Wisden Anthology 1864–1900 (1979) (edited)
- Fred Astaire (1980)
- Wisden Anthology 1900–1940 (1980) (edited)
- P. G. Wodehouse: A Literary Biography (1981)
- Wisden Anthology 1940–1963 (1982) (edited)
- Streets of London (1983)
- Wisden Anthology 1963–1982 (1983) (edited)
- London: A City of Many Dreams (1984)
- Benny Green's Cricket Archive (1985)
- The Last Empires: Documentary Anthology of Writing About the Music Hall (1986)
- The Wisden Book of Obituaries: Obituaries from Wisden Cricketers' Almanack (1986) (edited)
- The Lord's Companion (1987) (edited)
- A Hymn to Him: The Lyrics of Alan Jay Lerner (1987)
- A History of Cricket (1988)
- Let's Face the Music: The Golden Age of Popular Song (1990)
- The Reluctant Art (1991)
- Britain at War (1996)
- Such Sweet Thunder: Benny Green on Jazz (2002)
