= Boy Meets Girls =

- Starring: Marty Wilde ("Boy") meets The Vernons Girls
- Country of origin: United Kingdom
- Original language: English

Production
- Producer: Jack Good
- Production locations: Didsbury Studios, Manchester
- Production company: ABC

Original release
- Network: ITV
- Release: 12 September 1959 – 26 February 1960

Related
- Oh Boy! (1958); Wham! (1960)

Boy Meets Girls is a British music television show which was launched in September 1959, replacing the earlier show Oh Boy!.

The show was presented and produced by Jack Good. Marty Wilde was the principal resident male artist and The Vernons Girls were the female residents. Joe Brown made regular appearances. Other artists appearing included Terry Dene, Freddy Cannon, Little Tony & His Brothers, Adam Faith and Cliff Richard.

The director was Rita Gillespie for ABC Weekend TV, part of the ITV network.

The programme ended in 1960; all twenty-six episodes were subsequently wiped, and none survive in ITV's archive as of 2020.
