= Russ Hamilton (singer) =

English singer and songwriter (1932–2008)

- Born: 19 January 1932; Liverpool, England
- Died: 11 October 2008 (aged 76) Flintshire, Wales
- Genre: Pop
- Occupation: Singer
- Instruments: Vocals, guitar

Russ Hamilton (born Ronald Hulme; 19 January 1932 – 11 October 2008) was an English singer and songwriter. Hamilton made the Top 10 in the United Kingdom with "We Will Make Love", but in the United States, it was the B-side, "Rainbow", which made the Top 10.

== Biography ==
=== Early life ===
Russ Hamilton was born as Ronald Hulme in Everton, Liverpool, Lancashire in 1932. Prior to his fame, he worked as a cost clerk.

=== Career ===
He was one of the first singer-songwriters of pop music to have come out of the city, and he was the first Liverpool artist to hit the United States music scene with his song "Rainbow", several years before the Beatles. In 1957, chart success in the U.S. was very unusual for a British performer, and Hamilton commuted from one side of the Atlantic to the other to meet the demands for live performances.

A former Redcoat, Hamilton's first hit in the United Kingdom was "We Will Make Love", which he recorded in 1957 for Oriole Records. However, in the U.S., it was the B-side, "Rainbow", that became the hit; according to Hamilton himself, it was mistakenly thought to be the A-side of the single. This produced the possibly unique event of a single reaching the Top 10 in the UK, while its flipside achieved the same result across the Atlantic. "We Will Make Love" peaked at No. 2 in the UK Singles Chart, and "Rainbow" reached No. 4 on Billboard's Hot 100. The record sold over one million copies, and reached gold disc status. We Will Make Love was written about a girl from Blackpool named Patricia Hitchin, who Hamilton had fallen in love with.

Hamilton followed this success later that same year with another self-penned item, "Wedding Ring", which reached the Top 20 in the UK.

In 1960, he was invited to Nashville, Tennessee and signed up with MGM Records. In Nashville, he recorded "Gonna Find Me a Bluebird" with the Jordanaires and Chet Atkins. His success with record releases did not improve, and by the early 1960s he had dropped away from the foreground of the pop music scene. He wrote many songs which were popular, especially in Asia. "Little One", a song he wrote for his niece in Canada, was his personal favourite. Other songs such as "I Still Belong to You", "I Had a Dream" and "Reprieve of Tom Dooley" were quite popular. He performed the song "I Had A Dream" on the film spin-off of the TV show Six-Five Special. However, this hit has subsequently received little airplay.

=== Death ===
Hamilton died on 11 October 2008, at the age of 76, at his home in Buckley, North Wales.

== Discography ==
=== Albums ===
| Title | Year | Note |
|---|---|---|
| Rainbows | 1958 | |

=== Singles ===
| A-Side | B-Side | Year | Note |
|---|---|---|---|
| "I Don't Know Why" | "My Mother's Eyes" | 1957 | |
| "I Had a Dream" | "Little One" | 1957 | |
| "Little One" | "I Had a Dream" | 1957 | |
| "We Will Make Love" | "Rainbow" | 1957 | |
| "Wedding Ring" | "I Still Belong To You" | 1957 | |
| "The Things I Didn't Say" | "All Alone" | 1957 | |
| "My Unbreakable Heart" | "I Found You" | 1957 | |
| "I Wonder Who's Kissing Her Now" | "September in the Rain" | 1958 | |
| "Tiptoe Through the Tulips" | "Drifting And Dreaming" | 1958 | |
| "Strange Are the Ways of Love" | "Things I Didn't Say" | 1958 | |
| "The Reprieve of Tom Dooley" | "Dreaming of You" | 1959 | |
| "Smile, Smile, Smile, and Sing, Sing, Sing" | "Shadow" | 1959 | |
| "Choir Girl" | "Gonna Find Me a Bluebird" | 1960 | |
| "Folks Get Married in the Spring" | "It's a Sin to Tell a Lie" | 1960 | |
| "Valley of Love" | "Loneliest Boy in Town" | 1964 | |
| "Tomorrow" | "Rainbow" | 1970 | |

=== Extended plays ===
| Title | Tracks | Year | Note |
|---|---|---|---|
| Russ Hamilton | "Little One" / "I Had a Dream" / "I Don't Know Why" / "My Mother's Eyes" | 1958 | |
