= Rainbow (Russ Hamilton song) =

Single by Russ Hamilton

from the album Rainbows
- A-side: "We Will Make Love"
- Released: March 1957 (UK); June 1957 (US)
- Genre: Pop
- Length: 2:40
- Label: Oriole 1359 (UK); Kapp 184 (US)
- Songwriter(s): Russ Hamilton

Russ Hamilton singles chronology
"Rainbow" (1957)	"Wedding Ring" (1957)

"Rainbow" is a song written and performed by Russ Hamilton. It reached #4 on the U.S. pop chart and #10 on the R&B chart in 1957. The song was featured on his 1957 album, Rainbows.

The song was arranged by Johnny Gregory.

== Other versions ==
- Bobby Breen released a version of the song in 1957 as the B-side to his single, "We Will Make Love".
- Jim Lowe released a version of the song as part of the Rainbow EP in 1957.
- Clinton Ford released a version of the song as a single in 1963 in the UK.
- The Fleetwoods released a version of the song as a single in 1965.
- Jerry Wallace released a version of the song in 1965 in the UK as the B-side to his single, "Time".
- Tommy Roe released a version of the song in 1962 as the B-side to his single, "Town Crier".
- Terry Black released a version of the song as a single in 1966 that reached #17 in Canada.
