= Edelman and Fishman =

American song writing partnership

Harvey Edelman and Neil Fishman are an American songwriting team, that created and produced the first two audiobook musicals. The first, titled Spin - The Rumpelstiltskin Musical, distributed by HarperAudio, and featuring Jim Dale. The music of Spin was composed by Fishman, who also did the musical arrangements for the audiobook. Edelman wrote the book and lyrics and adapted his original stage play to the audiobook with David B. Coe, a popular writer of Fantasy novels. The cast of Spin, a witty musical re-imagining of the Grimm's fairy tale, also featured a list of Broadway and audiobook performers. Spin won the 2018 SOVAS Voice Arts Awards, in two categories including Best Cast in Children's Production and Outstanding Audiobook Production, the 2018 Parents Choice Awards – Silver Honor for Audiobook, and the 2019 Audie Award winner for best "Original Work". They followed up Spin with Puss In Boots a Musical, which was co-adapted by Khristine Hvam. Puss In Boots also featured Jim Dale and a cast of Broadway veterans and was released in August 2019. Puss In Boots a Musical won two 2019 SOVAS Awards for Best Voiceover performance in a Children's Production and Best Audiobook Production, Parents Choice Silver Honor, and was an Audie Awards finalist for Best Audio Drama.

== Career ==
Edelman and Fishman started working together in 1975, when they collaborated on a musical adaptation of George Farquhar's restoration comedy, The Beaux' Stratagem, titled, To Bed a Fortune, which was produced in 1976. They were introduced by their co-writer and director of the production, Alan Gerstel, who later wrote a book about his personal search for his birth parents, titled Swing: The Search For My Father, Louis Prima. Gerstel, among other endeavors, was a respected news anchorman in the south Florida area for many years.

Edelman and Fishman have collaborated on a number of educational works including Songsleuth, a musical to be performed by sixth graders for their classmates. Songsleuth was published in the Macmillan Publishing Educational Series, "Music and You" and a recording of the songs is part of the accompanying "Music and You" soundtrack on CBS Records, produced by Merrill Staton and Barbara Staton. With the success of Songsleuth, the pair was commissioned to write a new children's musical for the 1995 edition of "Music and You" titled, Earthkids, the Musical, a musical that teaches children about environmental concerns and what they can do about them. In addition to hundreds of school productions, Earthkids was produced in Nyack, New York, in 1996, under the direction of Rita Veri.

Edelman and Fishman have also written and produced songs about hygiene, nutrition, and dental care for the national Headstart Program, sponsored by the Soap and Detergent Association, Weightwatchers, and Colgate-Palmolive, respectively.

In 1989, they were commissioned by the Pittsburgh Playhouse Junior to write a musical version of Puss in Boots, for its Spring Season and serve as Artists In Residence prior to its debut. Puss 'n Boots, the Musical was subsequently produced in other regional and community theaters. The genesis of that commission was the Pittsburgh Playhouse's production of an earlier Edelman/Fishman children's musical, Rumpelstiltskin, originally produced in northern New Jersey by the Bergen County Players.

Their other works include On The Air, a musical spoof of the Golden Age of Radio, co-written by Peter Palame, which first appeared Off-Broadway in 1984 with numerous subsequent theater productions; a musical about independent business people titled, Entrepreneurs, written with Mel Friedman; and a musical based on Sidney Kingsley's landmark play, Dead End, also co-written with Peter Palame, first developed in the ASCAP Musical Theater Workshop that was chosen for a staged reading at the Dramatists Guild Musical Theater Workshop. The multicast concept album of "Dead End the Musical" was produced in New York and Phoenix, and released on all streaming services in 2022.

In 2004, they collaborated with Janice Cohen, the author of The Christmas Menorahs, How a Town Fought Hate to create the musical Nightlights, which recounted the true story of how people of all faiths and races came together in the town of Billings, Montana, in 1993 to successfully fight a group of haters threatening the town's tiny Jewish population and other minorities. Nightlights had its debut production at the Passage Theatre in Trenton, NJ, in 2005.

== Business entities ==
Under the auspices of Creative Audio Enterprises, their audio marketing company also doing business as HOLDCOM, and Sammy Smile Music, their publishing company, they have also written and produced award-winning musical numbers for advertising and industrial projects out of their production facilities in northern New Jersey. Their music has been heard on stage, cabaret, television, radio, film, and the Internet.

== Background ==
Fishman received his formal musical education at Juilliard Preparatory Division and later earned his degree at Yale University. Besides his work as a composer and producer, he has also done extensive work as musical director, vocal coach, and arranger.

Edelman earned a degree in journalism from Georgia State University. In addition to his work as lyricist and producer, he has written the librettos for a number of their musicals including, Rumpelstiltskin, Songsleuth, and Puss In Boots.
