= Girls of the Latin Quarter =

1960 British film by Alfred Travers

- Directed by: Alfred Travers
- Written by: Brad Ashton; Alfred Travers; Dick Vosburgh
- Produced by: Olive Negus-Fancey
- Starring: Bernard Hunter; Jill Ireland; Sheldon Lawrence
- Cinematography: Hilton Craig
- Edited by: Monica Kimick
- Music by: Jackie Brown; Cy Payne
- Production company: E.J. Fancey Productions
- Release date: March 1960
- Running time: 69 minutes
- Country: United Kingdom
- Language: English

Girls of the Latin Quarter is a 1960 British second feature ('B') comedy musical film directed by Alfred Travers and starring Bernard Hunter, Jill Ireland and Sheldon Lawrence. It was written by Brad Ashton, Travers and DIck Vosburgh.

== Plot ==
Under the terms of a will, a young man stands to inherit a fortune if he can he turn the prospects of the family farm around. He comes up with a scheme to raise money by putting on a Show.

== Cast ==
- Bernard Hunter as Clive Smedley
- Jill Ireland as Jill
- Sheldon Lawrence as Mac
- Danny Green as Hodgson
- Joe Baker as Finch
- Sonya Cordeau as herself, singer
- Cuddly Dudley as himself, singer
- Mimi Pearce as herself, dancer
- Cherry Wainer as herself, organist

== Critical reception ==
The Monthly Film Bulletin wrote: "Almost everything about this film is shoddy. Even the editing, lighting, colour and sound quality cannot maintain acceptable standards. After oafish comedy scenes, primitively directed, the story tails off in a series of floor show turns, interspersed with drunken gambollings by Bernard Hunter. The film seems to be an attempt to display the attractiveness and sophistication of the Latin Quarter night-club and its clientele, but the bungling direction makes both look rather silly."
