= Dominic Green (writer and musician) =

British writer and musician

Dominic Green (born 1970) is a British historian, columnist and musician. A Fellow of the Royal Historical Society and the Royal Society of Arts, he is editor of the US edition of The Spectator and a commissioning editor of The Critic. He is a columnist and film reviewer for The Spectator, and a columnist for The Daily Telegraph. He also writes frequently on books and arts for The Wall Street Journal, The New Criterion, The Spectator (UK), Standpoint, The Literary Review, and The Oldie. He has also written for The Atlantic, Commentary, The Economist, First Things, The Weekly Standard, CapX and the antiquities magazine Minerva.

== Biography ==
Green is the son of the saxophonist and writer Benny Green and actress Toni Kanal, and the brother of saxophonist and BBC Radio presenter Leo Green. He read English Literature at St John's College, Oxford. Subsequently, he read for an AM in Jewish Studies at Harvard University, and a PhD in Comparative History at Brandeis University, where he was the Mandel Fellow in the Humanities.

== Author ==
Green is the author of a biography of his father, Benny Green: Words and Music (2000), and editor of the collection Such Sweet Thunder: Benny Green on Jazz (2001). His first history book, The Double Life of Dr. Lopez: Spies, Shakespeare and the Plot to Poison Elizabeth I (2003) was described in The Sunday Times of London as 'popular history at its best'. Green's second history book, Three Empires on the Nile: The Victorian Jihad 1869-1899 (2007; UK title Armies of God) was acclaimed in media as varied as Foreign Affairs and Entertainment Weekly. In 2022, Green wrote The Religious Revolution: The Birth of Modern Spirituality, 1848-1898 which was published by Farrar, Straus & Giroux.

== Political and social commentary ==
Green writes political and social commentary for the US edition of The Spectator, the New York Post, the Jewish Chronicle, the Daily Telegraph, and The Wall Street Journal. Green's opinion pieces include frequent criticism of President Joe Biden as "senile" or mentally impaired and having "low energy", praise for President Donald Trump's policies and victory "on points" in the 2020 United States presidential debates, while dismissing Tucker Carlson and Steve Bannon as "wicked uncles" peddling antisemitic narratives of malign Jewish influence.

Green criticised the FBI's criminal investigation of convicted sex offender Jeffrey Epstein, Ghislaine Maxwell, and Prince Andrew for failing to act quickly enough.

== Television ==
- Queen Elizabeth's Secret Agents (BBC/PBS, 2017); nominated for a Royal Television Society award, 2018.

== Bibliography ==
- Benny Green: Words and Music, London, London House, 2000, ISBN 1-902809-39-4, 252p.
- The Double Life of Doctor Lopez: Spies, Shakespeare and the Plot to Poison Elizabeth I, London, Century, 2003, ISBN 0-7126-1539-3, 402p.
  - Paperback reprint: Arrow Books Ltd., 2004, ISBN 0-09-943189-0
- Three Empires on the Nile: The Victorian Jihad, 1869-1898, Free Press, January 2007, ISBN 0-7432-8071-7, 304p.
  - (UK ed.) Armies of God: Islam and Empire on the Nile, 1869-1899, Century, 2007, ISBN 9781844138838, 370p.
- Religious Revolution: The Birth of Modern Spirituality, 1848-1898, New York: Farrar, Straus, and Giroux, 2022.

== Edited ==
- Such Sweet Thunder: Benny Green on Jazz, Simon & Schuster, 2001, ISBN 0-7432-0835-8
