= Join Jim Dale =

1969 British television comedy series

Join Jim Dale is a British television comedy series aired in 1969 on ITV. It was produced by Associated Television (ATV) and starred Jim Dale and featured guest stars such as Hattie Jacques, Roy Kinnear, Anna Quayle, Beryl Reid, Dame Sybil Thorndike, and Kenneth Williams.

All six episodes are believed to have been destroyed.
