= Alive on Saturday =

1957 British film by Alfred Travers

- Guy Middleton as George Pilbeam
- Directed by: Alfred Travers
- Screenplay by: Brandon Fleming
- Produced by: Geoffrey Goodhart
- Starring: Guy Middleton; Patricia Owens; Geoffrey Goodhart
- Cinematography: Hilton Craig
- Edited by: Carmen Beliaeff
- Production company: Pan Productions
- Release date: 8 April 1957
- Running time: 58 minutes
- Country: United Kingdom
- Language: English

Alive on Saturday is a 1957 lost British second feature ('B') black-and-white comedy-thriller film directed by Alfred Travers and starring Guy Middleton, Patricia Owens and Geoffrey Goodhart. It was written by Brandon Fleming. The film was made in 1954 but not released until 1957.

== Plot ==
Penniless man-about-town George Pilbeam bumps into his friend Slade who offers him a generous payment if he will register at a London hotel and stay there for three days, until Saturday. Pilbeam accepts the assignment but on moving into the hotel is attacked by foreign agents. He escapes but is then mistaken for the Prince of Pagodia by eccentric American millionaire Joseph H. Parker. The agents are arrested, and Pilbeam falls in love with Parker's daughter.

== Cast ==
- Guy Middleton as George Pilbeam
- Patricia Owens as Sally Parker
- Geoffrey Goodhart as Joseph H. Parker
- John Witty as Slade
- Jessica Cairns as Maisie
- John Salew as Melito
- Charles Lloyd Pack as Gorman
- Wallas Eaton as Garton

== Preservation status ==
The film is believed lost and is included on the British Film Institute's "75 Most Wanted" list, with the BFI calling the film "a very lively sounding comedy-thriller, and as an example of a low-budget British B movie it has quite a curiosity factor to it." Their National Archive holds a collection of stills but no film or video materials.

== Reception ==
The Monthly Film Bulletin wrote: "Inexpert comedy thriller, with an inane story, cramped settings and tepid acting. Guy Middleton wanders amiably through the leading role."

Kine Weekly wrote: "The principal players work hard, but fail to achieve the impossible and extract either laughs or thrills from its wildly incredible tale. Its staging's cheap, too. Tinpot quota. The picture attempts to get out of the rut, but stretches credulity too far. Guy Middleton makes the best of a bad job as the bewildered George, and Patricia Owens pleases as Sally, but the rest fight a losing battle with a sketchy script. Incidentally, it was produced a few years back, but nobody has taken the trouble to remove blatant evidence."

Picturegoer wrote: "Just how slapdash can British films be? Take this comedy-melodrama. It not only tells an absurdly far-fetched story about a hard-up English fancy-pants who wins an American bride while mistaken for a prince in London, but neglects to remove evidence that it's been on the shelf for at least three years."

In British Sound Films: The Studio Years 1928–1959 David Quinlan rated the film as "poor", writing: "Comedy lacks the style to smooth over its foolishness. Not released until 1957."

Chibnall and McFarlane in The British 'B' Film called it a "contrived little 'B' thriller".
