= The Dallas Boys =

- Origin: Leicester, England
- Genres: Pop
- Years active: 1950s–early 1970s, reunited 1988
- Past members: Joe Smith; Stan Jones; Bob Wragg; Leon Fisk; Nicky Clarke; Tony Day; Jerry Angelo

The Dallas Boys were a five-piece vocal group from Leicester, England who were regular performers on British television in the 1950s and 1960s. They have been described as "Britain's first boy band".

== History ==
The group formed in Leicester and comprised four former pupils of Moat Boys School (Joe Smith, Stan Jones, Bob Wragg, and Leon Fisk) and London-born Nicky Clarke. After winning a Butlins talent content, they became a fixture on the TV show Six-Five Special, becoming household names. They went on to be regular performers on Oh Boy! in the late 1950s.

The group continued to perform through the 1960s, and appeared on other British TV shows such as Val Parnell's Startime, Thank Your Lucky Stars, All That Jazz, Sunday Night at the London Palladium, Comedy Bandbox, Frost on Sunday, and Sez Les, and on US television on Showtime. They split up in the early 1970s, but reunited in 1988 to perform at fellow Oh Boy! star Cliff Richard's concert celebrating thirty years in the entertainment business in 1989, and continued to perform around the UK.

They have been described as "Britain's first boy band".

Nicky Clarke died in March 2010, aged 77. Joe Smith died in 2012, aged 78. Bob Wragg died in 2019 as a result of oesophageal cancer, at the age of 85.

Stan Jones passed away in October 2025.

== Discography ==
=== Albums ===
- Five Alive-O (1974)
- The Dallas Boys Doing Their Own Thing! (A Souvenir Album) (1980)
- Love Is a Many Splendoured Thing (1983)

=== Singles ===
- "He Won't Love You (Like I Do)" (1967)
- "I Can't Fool My Heart" (1968)
