= Jim Dale =

British actor, singer, songwriter (born 1935)

Jim Dale MBE
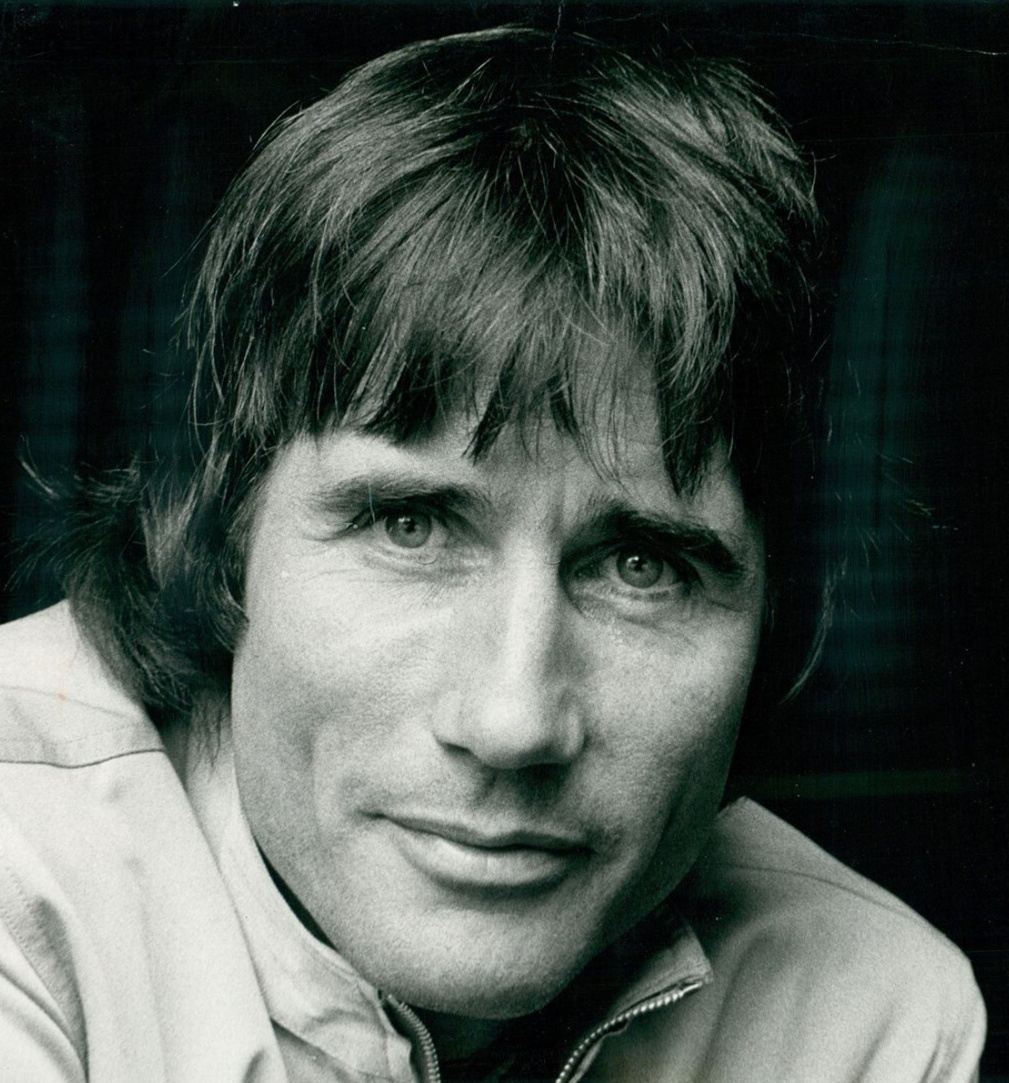
- Dale in 1974
- Born: James Smith; 15 August 1935 (age 91); Rothwell, Northamptonshire, England
- Occupations: Actor; singer; songwriter; voice actor
- Years active: 1951–present
- Spouses: Patricia Gardiner (m. 1957; div. 1977) Julie Schafler (m. 1981)
- Children: 4
- Website: jim-dale.com

Jim Dale (born James Smith; 15 August 1935) is an English actor, narrator, singer and songwriter. In the United Kingdom he is known as a pop singer of the 1950s who became a leading actor at the National Theatre. He is one of the only surviving main actors of the Carry On films.

Dale was also a leading actor on Broadway, where he had roles in Scapino, Barnum (for which he won a Tony Award), Candide and Me and My Girl. He also narrated the U.S. audiobooks for all seven novels in the Harry Potter series, for which he won two Grammy Awards. Dale appeared in the ABC series Pushing Daisies (2007–2009); he also starred in the Disney film Pete's Dragon (1977). He was nominated for a BAFTA Award for portraying a young Spike Milligan in Adolf Hitler: My Part in His Downfall (1973).

As a lyricist, Dale was nominated for both an Academy Award and Golden Globe Award for the song "Georgy Girl", the theme for the 1966 film of the same title.

== Early life ==
Dale was born James Smith, to William Henry and Miriam Jean (née Wells) Smith in Rothwell, Northamptonshire. He was educated at Kettering Grammar School. He trained as a dancer for six years before his debut as a stage comic in 1951. He completed two years of national service in the Royal Air Force.

== Career ==
=== Music ===
At the age of 22, Dale became the first pop singer to work with Parlophone head George Martin. He achieved four hits on the UK singles chart; "Be My Girl" (1957, UK No. 2), "Just Born (To Be Your Baby)" (1958, UK No. 27), "Crazy Dream" (1958, UK No. 24), and "Sugartime" (1958, UK No. 25). Dale recorded an album with Martin, Jim! (1958), and appeared contemporaneously as a presenter and performer on BBC Television's Six-Five Special, but he was vocal about comedy aspirations and his career as a teen idol was ultimately short-lived.

As a songwriter, Dale is best remembered as the lyricist for the film theme "Georgy Girl", for which he was nominated for the Academy Award for Best Original Song and the Golden Globe Award for Best Original Song in 1966. The song (performed by the Seekers) reached number 2 in the US Billboard Hot 100 chart the following year, it also made number 3 in Dale's native UK and Number 1 in Australia, going on to sell over 11 million records around the world. He also wrote lyrics for the title songs of the films The Winter's Tale, Shalako, Twinky (Lola in the United States) and Joseph Andrews. He also wrote and recorded the song "Dick-a-Dum-Dum (King's Road)", which became a hit for Des O'Connor in 1969.

Between 1957 and 1958, Dale was the compère for Stanley Dale's National Skiffle Contest, a touring music competition.

=== Film ===
Dale's film debut was in Break-In (1956), a War Office information film. He next appeared in Six Five Special (1958), a spin-off from the BBC TV series of the same title. This film was also released under the name Calling All Cats. He then had a tiny role in the comedy Raising the Wind (1961) as a trombone player who thwarts orchestral conductor Kenneth Williams. However, he is best known in Britain for his appearances in eleven Carry On films, a long-running series of comedy farces, generally playing the hapless romantic lead. His Carry On career began in small roles: first as an expectant father in Carry On Cabby (1963), which was followed by Carry On Jack (1964). From Carry On Spying (1964) onwards, his roles were more substantial. Following Carry On Cleo (1964), his first principal role was Carry On Cowboy (1965), set in the Wild West, where he played an immigrant English sanitary engineer called Marshall P. Knutt who is mistakenly hired as a police marshal. Then came Carry On Screaming! (1966), Don't Lose Your Head (1966), Follow That Camel (1967), Carry On Doctor (1967), Carry On Again Doctor (1969) and the 1992 revival Carry On Columbus. Dale played Harold, the policeman in the 1965 comedy film The Big Job with two of his regular Carry On co-stars, Sidney James and Joan Sims.

In 1973, Dale appeared in the role of Spike Milligan in Adolf Hitler: My Part in His Downfall, the film adaptation of the first volume of Spike Milligan's autobiography. It starred Dale as the young Terence "Spike" Milligan, while Milligan himself plays the part of his father, Leo. Dale was nominated for the BAFTA Award for Most Promising Newcomer to Leading Film Roles for his performance.

Dale played Dr. Terminus in Walt Disney's Pete's Dragon (1977). In the 1978 Walt Disney comedy film Hot Lead and Cold Feet he played three characters, including both lead male parts, whilst 1973 saw him co-star in The National Health.

=== Stage ===
At the age of 17 Dale toured variety music halls. In 1970 Laurence Olivier invited Dale to join the National Theatre Company in London, then based at the Old Vic. At the Young Vic Theatre, he created the title role in Scapino (ca. 1970), which he co-adapted with Frank Dunlop, and played Petruchio in The Taming of the Shrew. His other UK credits include The Card (1973), and The Wayward Way in London. He appeared in The Winter's Tale as Autolycus and A Midsummer Night's Dream as Bottom at the Edinburgh Festivals in 1966 and 1967 for Frank Dunlop's Pop Theatre. He took over the part of Fagin in Cameron Mackintosh's Oliver! at the London Palladium in September 1995.

For his Broadway performances, Dale has been nominated for five Tony Awards, winning one for Barnum (1980) for which the New York Times described him as "The Toast of Broadway", also winning the second of five Drama Desk Awards, and the second of five Outer Critics Awards. Other work includes Scapino (1974) (Drama Desk Award, Outer Critics Award, Tony Award Nomination), A Day in the Death of Joe Egg (1985) (Outer Critics Award, Tony Award Nomination), Me and My Girl (1986) Candide (1997) (Tony Award Nomination) and The Threepenny Opera (2006) for the Roundabout Theatre Company. Dale played Mister Peacham and won a Drama Desk Award, Outer Critics' Award, The Richard Seff Award and a Tony Award nomination.

Dale's credits Off-Broadway include Travels with My Aunt (1995) (Drama Desk Award, Lucille Lortel Award, Outer Critics Award), Privates On Parade (1989), Comedians (2003) (Drama Desk Award nomination and a Lucille Lortel Award nomination) and Address Unknown (2004). In 1988, he performed as Oscar in Sweet Charity at Avery Fisher Hall.

Dale's other stage work includes The Taming of the Shrew as Petruchio with the Young Vic, London (1970) and the Brooklyn Academy of Music, New York (1974); The Music Man U.S. tour (1984), and The Invisible Man at the Cleveland Play House (1998). He played the part of Ebenezer Scrooge in A Christmas Carol at the Theater at Madison Square Garden, New York City, from 28 November to 27 December 2003.

In 2006 Dale starred as Charlie Baxter in a one-night only concert version of the Sherman brothers musical Busker Alley alongside Glenn Close. This was a benefit for the York Theatre Company, and was held at Hunter College in New York City. He wrote and appeared in his one-man show, Just Jim Dale, looking back over nearly sixty years in show business. It opened on 15 May 2014 at the Roundabout Theatre Company Laura Pels Theatre, winning Dale his fifth Outer Critics Circle Award, and his fifth Drama Desk Award. It opened at the Vaudeville Theatre in the West End in May 2015.

=== Voice work ===
In the United States, Dale is known as the voice of the Harry Potter audiobooks, narrating the U.S. versions of all seven novels in the series. Dale's Harry Potter narrations are universally acclaimed. He won two Grammy Awards (in 2001 and 2008) and received seven Grammy nominations and a record ten Audie Awards including "Audio Book of the Year 2004" for Harry Potter and the Order of the Phoenix, "Best Children's Narrator 2001/2005/2007/2008," "Best Children's Audio Book 2005," two Benjamin Franklin Awards from the Independent Book Publishers Association (one of these was in 2001 for Harry Potter and the Prisoner of Azkaban) and 23 AudioFile Earphone Awards. The audio short series Dirty Potter uses sound editing of Dale's past voice work to narrate the series. The series is a parody narrated by a "re-imagined" version of Dale, and its content was created without Dale's input.

Dale narrates the Harry Potter video games and many of the interactive "extras" on the Harry Potter DVD releases. He also holds one current and two former Guinness World Records. He holds one current record for occupying the first six places in the Top Ten Audio Books of America and Canada 2005. Previously, he held records for creating the most character voices for an audiobook (134 for Harry Potter and the Order of the Phoenix in 2003, followed by 146 voices for Harry Potter and the Deathly Hallows in 2007), though the record was later awarded to Roy Dotrice for his 2004 recording of A Game of Thrones. Dale opened every episode of the ABC drama Pushing Daisies as the unseen narrator.

In the mid-1960s, Dale presented Children's Favourites on BBC Radio for a year.

In 2018, Dale narrated SPIN: The Rumpelstiltskin Musical by Edelman and Fishman, noted as being the first audiobook musical of its kind. SPIN was released by Harper Audio on 9 January 2018. The following year, Dale narrated Puss In Boots a Musical by Edelman and Fishman, adapted for the audiobook by Edelman, Fishman, and Khristine Hvam. It was released by Harper Audio on 27 August 2019. Dale narrated the Peter and the Starcatchers (2004) audio book, and its three sequels. Most recently, Dale voiced all the characters in Duckville, a Bill Plympton animated short film that had its premiere in September 2025.

== Works ==
=== Film ===
Source: The New York Times

- Break-In (1956) as Private Berry
- Six Five Special (1958) as Presenter
- Raising the Wind (1961) as Violinist
- The Iron Maiden (1962) as Bill
- Nurse on Wheels (1963) as Tim Taylor
- Carry On Cabby (1963) as Expectant Father
- Carry On Jack (1964) as Carrier
- Carry On Spying (1964) as Carstairs
- Carry On Cleo (1964) as Horsa
- The Big Job (1965) as Harold
- Carry On Cowboy (1965) as Marshall P. Knutt
- Carry On Screaming! (1966) as Albert Potter
- Don't Lose Your Head (1967) as Lord Darcy de Pue
- Follow That Camel (1967) as Bertram Oliphant (BO) West
- Carry On Doctor (1967) as Dr. Jim Kilmore
- The Plank (1967) as Painter
- Lock Up Your Daughters (1969) as Lusty
- Carry On Again Doctor (1969) as Dr. Jimmy Nookey
- Digby, the Biggest Dog in the World (1973) as Jeff Eldon
- The National Health (1973) as Barnet/ Dr. Boyd
- Adolf Hitler: My Part in His Downfall (1973) as Terence "Spike" Milligan
- Pete's Dragon (1977) as Dr. Terminus
- Joseph Andrews (1977) as Pedlar
- Hot Lead and Cold Feet (1978) as Jasper Bloodshy/Wild Billy Bloodshy/Eli Bloodshy
- Unidentified Flying Oddball (1979) as Sir Mordred
- Scandalous (1984) as Inspector Anthony Crisp
- Carry On Columbus (1992) as Christopher Columbus
- The Hunchback (1997) as Cloplin
- Pushing Daisies (2007) as The Narrator

=== Television ===
Source: The New York Times

- Six-Five Special (1957) – BBC (Host)
- Thank Your Lucky Stars (1965–66) – ITV (Host)
- Join Jim Dale (1969) – ITV (Host)
- Sunday Night at the London Palladium (1973) – (Host)
- Cinderella (Host) Ballet (1981)
- Adventures of Huckleberry Finn (1986) – American Playhouse for PBS
- The American Clock (1993) – by Arthur Miller
- The Bill Cosby Show (1998)
- The Ellen Burstyn Show
- The Dinah Shore Show
- Meet Jim Dale – ATV London
- The Jim Dale Show – ATV London
- The Equalizer (1985) – as Gilbert – Episode: "Mama's Boy"
- Pushing Daisies (2009) as the unseen narrator.

=== Stage ===
Year	Production	Role	Venue / Notes	Source
1970	Scapino	Scapino	Young Vic Theatre; adaptation by Frank Dunlop & Jim Dale	
1973	The Card	Denry Machin (assumed)	UK production	
1995	Oliver!	Fagin	London Palladium revival	
2015	Just Jim Dale	Himself	Vaudeville Theatre, West End	

==== Broadway ====
Years	Production	Role	Notes	Source
1974–1975	Scapino!	Scapino	Tony Award nomination; Drama Desk Award	
1980–1982	Barnum	Phineas Taylor Barnum	Tony Award: Best Actor in a Musical	
1985	A Day in the Death of Joe Egg	Bri	Tony nomination	
1986–1989	Me and My Girl	Bill Snibson (replacement)	—	
1997	Candide	Voltaire / Pangloss / others	Tony nomination	
2006	The Threepenny Opera	Mr. Peachum	Drama Desk Award; Tony nomination	
2012	The Road to Mecca	Marius Byleveld	—	

==== Off-Broadway and other theatre ====
Year	Production	Role	Venue / Notes	Source
2003	Comedians	Eddie Waters	New York production	
2004	Address Unknown	Max Eisenstein	New York	
2014	Just Jim Dale	Himself	Roundabout Theatre Company	

== Awards and honours ==
Sources: allmusic.com; Playbillvault; Audio Publisher

- 1966 International Laurel Award – Best Song – Georgy Girl
- 1974 Drama Desk Award – Outstanding Performance – Scapino
- 1974 Outer Critics Circle Award – Outstanding Actor – Scapino
- 1980 Drama Desk Award – Outstanding Actor in a Musical – Barnum
- 1980 Tony Award – Best Actor in a Musical – Barnum
- 1984 Outer Critics Circle Award – Outstanding Actor – Joe Egg
- 1995 Drama Desk Award – Unique Theatrical Ensemble Experience – Travels with My Aunt
- 1995 Outer Critics Circle Award – Outstanding Actor – Travels with My Aunt
- 2001 Grammy Award – Best Spoken Word Album for Children – Harry Potter and the Goblet of Fire
- 2001 Audie Award – Best Male Narrator – Harry Potter and the Goblet of Fire
- 2003 MBE, as part of the Queen's Birthday Honours List, for his work in promoting children's English literature.
- 2004 Audie Award – Audiobook of the Year – Harry Potter and the Order of the Phoenix
- 2004 Audie Award – Children's Title – Harry Potter and the Order of the Phoenix
- 2005 Audie Award – Classics – A Christmas Carol
- 2005 Audie Award – Best Male Narrator – Peter and the Star Catchers
- 2005 Audie Award – Children's Title – Peter and the Starcatchers
- 2006 Thespian Award – Friars Club, New York.
- 2006 Drama Desk Award – Outstanding Featured Actor in a Musical – The Threepenny Opera
- 2006 Outer Critics Circle Award – Outstanding Actor – The Threepenny Opera
- 2006 The Richard Seff Award – The Threepenny Opera
- 2006 The Order of St. George's Society, New York
- 2006 Audie Award – Classics – Around the World in Eighty Days
- 2006 Audie Award – Hall of Fame - Harry Potter series
- 2007 Audie Award – Best Male Narrator – Peter and the Shadow Thieves
- 2008 Audie Award – Best Male Narrator – Harry Potter and the Deathly Hallows
- 2008 Grammy Award – Best Spoken Word Album for Children – Harry Potter and the Deathly Hallows
- 2009 Audie Award – Young Listeners' Title – James Herriot's Treasury For Children
- Twenty-three Audiofile Headphone Awards
- 2009 – Inducted into the American Theater Hall of Fame.
- 2018 – Urban Stages' 2017 Lifetime Achievement Award
- 2019 Audie Award – Original Work – SPIN: The Rumpelstiltskin Musical
- 2019 SOVAS Awards - Audiobook Narration (Infant to 12) - Puss in Boots: A Musical
