= Catch My Soul =

1974 film directed by Patrick McGoohan

- Film poster
- Directed by: Patrick McGoohan
- Screenplay by: Jack Good
- Based on: Catch My Soul (1968 musical) by Jack Good; Othello (1603 play) by William Shakespeare
- Produced by: Jack Good; Richard M. Rosenbloom
- Starring: Richie Havens; Lance LeGault; Season Hubley; Tony Joe White; Susan Tyrrell
- Cinematography: Conrad Hall
- Edited by: Richard A. Harris
- Music by: Tony Joe White; Emil Dean Zoghby; Ray Pohlman; Delaney Bramlett (adaptation)
- Production company: Metromedia Productions
- Distributed by: Cinerama Releasing Corporation
- Release date: March 22, 1974 (New York City)
- Running time: 97 minutes
- Country: United States
- Language: English

Catch My Soul (also known as Santa Fe Satan) is a 1974 American musical drama film directed by Patrick McGoohan, based on Jack Good's 1968 rock musical, which in turn is a modern retelling of William Shakespeare's Othello. It stars Richie Havens, Lance LeGault, Season Hubley, Tony Joe White and Susan Tyrrell.

The film was released by Cinerama Releasing Corporation on March 22, 1974, and was largely a critical and commercial flop. It was McGoohan's only feature film as a director.

== Cast ==
- Richie Havens as Othello
- Lance LeGault as Iago
- Season Hubley as Desdemona
- Tony Joe White as Cassio
- Susan Tyrrell as Emilia
- Delaney Bramlett
- Bonnie Bramlett
- Raleigh Gardenhire
- Billy Joe Royal
- Wayne Waterhouse

== Production ==
Shakespeare's tragedy of revenge and racism had been retitled Catch My Soul for the London stage and relocated from Venice to Piccadilly; for the film, the location of the drama was moved to the New Mexico desert; filming took place in Española and Santa Fe. The title comes from act 3, scene 3 of Shakespeare's play, in which Othello declares his love for Desdemona, "Perdition catch my soul / But I do love thee! And when I love thee not, / Chaos is come again."

Although much of the plot remains intact, Othello, the "noble Moor" becomes the pacifist leader of a hippie commune, Iago appears to be the Devil incarnate who "fits all the negative stereotypes of dropouts with his scruffy beard and unwashed look" and Desdemona becomes a "white round-faced girl with granny glasses".

Patrick McGoohan had earlier starred in the successful 1962 modernisation of the Othello story, All Night Long, which had been moved to 1960s London and fuelled by jazz music. AllMovie's reviewer points out that "perhaps he thought lightning would strike twice in moving it to a gospel show in the Southwest. He was terribly wrong."

Of the cast, Richie Havens was well known from his appearance at Woodstock Festival, but this was his first acting role; Lance LeGault had some experience, but not playing major roles; likewise Season Hubley and Susan Tyrrell. Tony Joe White was already fairly well known as a musician. Allmovie's Craig Butler was moved to comment "Laughable also describes every dramatic performance, as do horrible and unbelievable."

== Reception ==
The film appeared at the same time as Jesus Christ Superstar. It failed as an arthouse film, was retitled Santa Fe Satan, and reissued as a drive-in exploitation film.

Critical reviews of Catch My Soul were generally negative, Time Out's reviewer describing it as

Hampered all the way by McGoohan's languorous direction, which lets each appalling moment of this uncomfortable hybrid of grade-school Shakespeare and grade-school religion sink wincingly in.

Leslie Halliwell was equally scathing, his description being

A rock and country musical version of Othello, in which the tragic original is trivialized to the point of boredom.

AllMovie's Craig Butler was able to say that "some of the musical performances, especially from Richie Havens and Tony Joe White are quite good, and much of the music is worth hearing ... removed from the movie." Nevertheless, his overall assessment is "a train wreck of a movie that inspires awe and that makes one appreciate a time when awful movies could be so bad in such an interesting way."

=== Director's response ===
Catch My Soul would be the only film to be directed by McGoohan, although he later directed some episodes of Columbo. In an interview with Première magazine in 1995, McGoohan gave some insight into why the film had failed:

I lived in New Mexico at that time and the producer did too. He'd heard I was available and that's how, after the hiatus that followed The Prisoner, I came back to the profession. Unhappily, in the process of making the film, he got religion. ... Catholicism. He became a convert; he took the film and re-cut it. The editor warned me, I asked that my name be taken off it, and, unhappily, that was not done. The result is a disaster. What's more, he added 18 minutes of religious stuff. Ridiculous. But the music was good. Ritchie wrote one or two marvellous songs. Again, it's one of those typical show business stories. Very sad.

== Home media ==
The film was released on Blu-Ray by boutique label Etiquette Pictures on November 17, 2015.

== Soundtrack ==
A soundtrack album was issued by Metromedia to tie-in with the film. Vincent Canby for The New York Times, in line with others, commented "Forget the movie and get the soundtrack album."

Track listing

1. "Othello, Pt. 1" – Tony Joe White. Sung by Tony Joe White
2. "Wash Us Clean" – Jack Good, Tony Joe White. Sung by Tony Joe White
3. "Catch My Soul, Pt. 1" – Jack Good, Tony Joe White. Sung by Lance LeGault
4. "Working on a Building" – Tony Joe White. Sung by Richie Havens
5. "Othello, Pt. 2" – Tony Joe White. Sung by Tony Joe White
6. "Catch My Soul, Pt. 2" – Jack Good, Tony Joe White. Sung by Lance LeGault
7. "Open Our Eyes" – Leon Lumkins. Sung by Richie Havens
8. "Backwoods Preacher Man" – Tony Joe White. Sung by Tony Joe White
9. "Looking Back" – Delaney Bramlett, Tony Joe White. Sung by Tony Joe White
10. "Eat the Bread-Drink the Wine" – Jack Good, Tony Joe White. Sung by Lance LeGault
11. "That's What God Said" – Delaney Bramlett. Sung by Lance LeGault. Sung by Delaney Bramlett
12. "Chug-A-Lug (The Drinking Song)" – Delaney Bramlett. Sung by Bonnie Bramlett
13. "I Found Jesus" – Delaney Bramlett. Sung by Delaney Bramlett
14. "Run, Shaker Life" – (unknown). Sung by Richie Havens
15. "Catch My Soul, Pt. 3" – Jack Good, Tony Joe White. Sung by Lance LeGault
16. "Book of Prophecy" – Jack Good, Richie Havens. Sung by Richie Havens
17. "Othello, Pt. 3" – Tony Joe White. Sung by Tony Joe White
18. "Lust of the Blood" – Jack Good, Ray Pohlman. Sung by Lance LeGault
19. "Tickle His Fancy" – Allene Lubin. Sung by Susan Tyrrell
20. "Why" – Jack Good, Emile Dean Zoghby. Sung by Richie Havens
21. "Othello, Pt. 4" – Tony Joe White. Sung by Tony Joe White
22. "Catch My Soul, Pt. 4" – Jack Good, Tony Joe White. Sung by Lance LeGault
23. "Put Out the Light" – Jack Good, Ray Pohlman. Sung by Richie Havens
24. "Othello, Pt. 5" – Tony Joe White. Sung by Tony Joe White.
