= Scotticism =

Word or phrase characteristic of Scots

A Scotticism is a phrase or word, used in English, which is characteristic of Scots.

== Overview ==
Scotticisms are generally divided into two types: covert Scotticisms, which generally go unnoticed as being particularly Scottish by those using them, and overt Scotticisms, usually used for stylistic effect, with those using them aware of their Scottish nature. Perhaps the most common covert Scotticism is the use of wee (meaning small or unimportant) as in "I'll just have a wee drink...". This adjective is used frequently in speech at all levels of society.

An archetypal example of an overt Scotticism is "Och aye the noo", which translates as "Oh yes, just now". This phrase is often used in parody by non-Scots and although the phrases "Och aye" and "the noo" are in common use by Scots separately, they are rarely used together. Other phrases of this sort include:

- Hoots mon!
- There's a moose loose aboot this hoose ("There's a mouse loose about this house"), a standard cliché highlighting Scots-language pronunciation
- It's a braw, bricht, muinlicht nicht (a phrase popularised by the music hall entertainer Harry Lauder)
- Lang may yer lum reek literally translates to "Long may your chimney smoke!", signifying "may you live long".
- Help ma Bob! (well known from the comic strip character Oor Wullie)

Many leading figures of the Scottish Enlightenment, particularly David Hume, strove to excise Scotticisms from their writing in an attempt to make their work more accessible to an English and wider European audience. In the following passage, Hume's contemporary James Boswell pondered upon the reasons why the Scots and the English were not always mutually intelligible:

It is thus that has arisen the greatest difference between English and Scots. Half the words are changed only a little, but the result of that is that a Scot is often not understood in England. I do not know the reason for it, but it is a matter of observation that although an Englishman often does not understand a Scot, it is rare that a Scot has trouble in understanding what an Englishman says... It is ridiculous to give the reason for it that a Scot is quicker than an Englishman and consequently cleverer in understanding everything. It is equally ridiculous to say that English is so musical that it charms the ears and lures men to understand it, while Scots shocks and disgusts by its harshness. I agree that English is much more agreeable than Scots, but I do not find that an acceptable solution for what we are trying to expound. The true reason for it is that books and public discourse in Scotland are in the English tongue.

Modern authorities agree that the Scots language was gradually eclipsed by English after the adoption of English-language Bibles during the Scottish Reformation and the use of English for administrative purposes following the Union of the Crowns in 1603 and the Act of Union in 1707. Scots Law was a notable exception in retaining much of its traditional terminology such as Act of Sederunt, sheriff-substitute, procurator fiscal, sasine, pursuer, interlocutor (court order) and messenger-at-arms. There is now a strong move in some quarters to restore the use of Scots.

== Examples ==
Examples of Scotticisms in everyday use include:

- to stay or to bide to mean "to live" or "to reside"
- to ken, meaning "to know"
- to get somebody, for example up the road, meaning "to accompany"
- the messages, meaning "groceries" or "shopping" more generally
- black affronted, meaning ashamed, embarrassed and offended
- droukit, meaning "soaked" (usually from rain)
- to be ages with somebody, meaning "the same age"
- a shot, meaning to give temporary usage, to try something out
- to flit, meaning to move house
- to go one's dinger, meaning "to do something vigorously"
- blether, meaning "gossip"
- to haver, meaning "talking nonsense"
- to give someone laldie meaning scolding, thrashing or punishment; also to Gie it laldy! meaning "to do something vigorously"
- (fair) wabbit meaning weary or exhausted
- (e.g. Monday) next meaning "a week on (Monday)"
- to be after having done something, to indicate an action recently completed (I'm just after my tea)
- oxters, meaning "armpits"
- to chitter meaning "to shiver"

== See also ==
- Anti-Scottish sentiment
- Dictionary of the Scots Language
- Doric
- Lallans
- Languages in the United Kingdom
- List of English words of Scots origin
- Phonological history of the Scots language
- Scottish Corpus of Texts and Speech
- Scottish English
