= Lance LeGault =

American actor (1937–2012)

- LeGault in 1979
- Born: William Lance LeGault; May 2, 1937; Chicago, Illinois, U.S.
- Died: September 10, 2012 (aged 75); Los Angeles, California, U.S.
- Other name: W. L. LeGault
- Occupation: Actor
- Years active: 1962–2012
- Spouse: Teresa LeGault (m. 1984)
- Children: 4

William Lance LeGault Sr. (May 2, 1937 – September 10, 2012) was an American actor and musician. He was best known as U.S. Army Colonel Roderick Decker in the 1980s American television series The A-Team.

== Early life ==
LeGault was born May 2, 1937 in Chicago, Illinois, the son of Mary Jean (née Kovachevich; died December 21, 1980) and Ernest Legault (1906–1941). LeGault's father was French Canadian from Moose Creek, Ontario. LeGault's mother, Mary, was born in Illinois, the daughter of Serb immigrants from the Austro-Hungarian Empire. The family was poor. He lived in an orphanage for a time between his father's death in 1941 and when his mother remarried in 1943. He started working at 11, and was fired from the railroad at 13 when they discovered he was not 18 as he had claimed.

He grew up in Chillicothe, Illinois and graduated from Chillicothe Township High School in 1955. He received a full football scholarship to the Municipal University of Wichita, where he majored in business administration for two years before dropping out to pursue a music career. He performed at the Louisiana Hayride during the late 1950s, and appeared as an extra and stuntman in the John Wayne film The Horse Soldiers, deciding to pursue an acting career at Wayne's encouragement.

After hitchhiking to Los Angeles, he found work at a blues bar called the Crossbow, which was frequented by Elvis Presley, whom he would befriend and who would kickstart his acting career.

During the 1960s, LeGault served in the United States Navy Reserve for four years.

== Career ==
Early in his film career, LeGault worked as a stuntman and dancer. LeGault's first three feature films were Elvis Presley movies, Girls! Girls! Girls! (1962) in which he was Presley's stunt double, Kissin' Cousins (1964), and Viva Las Vegas (1964). He also appeared in Presley's 1968 NBC television special Elvis (also known as Elvis' 68 Comeback Special), where he sat at the side of the stage playing a tambourine. He appeared in Roustabout, another Presley film, as a carnival barker. He was an assistant choreographer for Presley's 1967 film Clambake. He also appeared (uncredited) as a dancer in the Bob Fosse-directed musical Sweet Charity.

He released a self-titled pop record album in 1969 on the Bell Records subsidiary T-A label (Lance LeGault, TA-5002), on which he is credited as having written all the songs. The record was produced and arranged by Eddie Karam. Lee Herschberg was the recording engineer.

In 1969, he appeared as Iago in the UK stage version of Jack Good's Catch My Soul: Rock Othello, and played Iago again in the 1974 Metromedia film version of Catch My Soul.

He starred in television series and in television movies and was known mainly for portraying military personnel, especially officers. His best known television role was in the 1980s series The A-Team as Colonel Roderick Decker—a United States Army colonel who tried to catch the fugitive Vietnam veterans. He played the role of Colonel Decker from 1983 to 1986. He also had a recurring role in another 1980s hit television series, Magnum, P.I., as a United States Marine Corps colonel, Colonel "Buck" Greene.

LeGault was on screen in a variety of programs including the short lived series Werewolf in 1987. In 1980, he starred with Kenny Rogers in the television movie The Gambler. He made a few appearances on the second season of Dynasty as gangster Ray Bonning. He appeared on Knight Rider in the pilot episode "Knight of the Phoenix" and appeared (as a different character) in the season 2 episode "Knight in Shining Armor"; and played three different characters in Airwolf (in "To Snare a Wolf" and "Sweet Britches" as villains, and "Wildfire" in a comparatively rare good guy role) as well as doing the voice-overs for the series' first Season "saga sell" teasers. He guest-starred on yet another hit 1980s television series Dallas as Al Halliday in 1989. In 1984 he also starred in Murder, She Wrote, Season 4 Episode 20.

Often playing stern colonels, the low-pitched, gravelly-voiced actor portrayed Colonel Glass in the 1981 comedy Stripes, starring Bill Murray and John Candy.

He made many guest appearances on television series, his appearances ranged from The Rockford Files (episodes "Claire" and "A Deadly Maze"), Gunsmoke, Barbary Coast, Logan's Run, Police Woman, Battlestar Galactica, The Incredible Hulk (episode "The Antowuk Horror"), Wonder Woman, Buck Rogers in the 25th Century, The Dukes of Hazzard (episode "The Runaway"), T. J. Hooker, Tales of the Gold Monkey, Voyagers!, MacGyver, Simon & Simon, Sledge Hammer!, Star Trek: The Next Generation, Renegade and Crusade. He appeared on Land of the Giants in the first-season episode "Underground" as a police officer.

LeGault's last role was in the 2013 film Prince Avalanche, and the film is dedicated to him.

=== Voicework ===
On the Knight Rider season 1 DVD pilot commentary, creator Glen A. Larson mentioned that Lance LeGault had "a voice that was four octaves lower than God's." This trait helped him obtain roles (often) as a villain or other "tough guy". It also resulted in a side career doing voice-over work. LeGault's trademark voice was at one point featured on self-guided tour cassettes at Elvis Presley's Graceland in Memphis, Tennessee. For many years in the 1980s, LeGault voiced programme trailers for ABC.

In the video game world, he was heard as the voice of Major Manson in the 1998 video game Battlezone II: Combat Commander.

He lent his deep bass voice as Junior the Buffalo in Disney's Home on the Range (2004). What’s more, he voiced Yank Justice in the nine-episode, 30-minute 1985 series Bigfoot and the Muscle Machines, part of Marvel Productions' Super Sunday block.

From 2009 to 2010, he performed voiceover work for Burger King, with the then-new "Angry Whopper" burger. Other voice-over work on commercials included Dodge and 7-Up.

== Death ==
LeGault died from heart failure on Monday, September 10, 2012, at his home in Los Angeles at the age of 75, survived by his wife of 28 years Teresa, and their four children Mary, Teresa, Marcus and William Lance Jr.

== Filmography ==
- Girls! Girls! Girls! (1962) - Bass Player at Nightclub (uncredited)
- Kissin' Cousins (1964) - Hillbilly Dancer (uncredited)
- Viva Las Vegas (1964) - Son of the Lone Star State (uncredited)
- Roustabout (1964) - Barker (uncredited)
- The Swinger (1966) - Warren
- The Young Runaways (1968) - Curly
- Sweet Charity (1969) - Dancer (uncredited)
- Catch My Soul (1974) - Iago
- Gunsmoke (1974, TV series) - Oregon
- Rockford Files (1975-1977, TV Series) - Phil D'Agosto / Stone (credited as W.L. LeGault)
- Logan's Run (1977, TV Series, Episode: "The Judas Goat") - Matthew
- The Kentucky Fried Movie (1977) - Toy Robot (segment "A Fistful of Yen") (voice, uncredited)
- The Incredible Hulk (1977, TV series, episode "The Antowuk Horror") - Brad
- Coma (1978) - Vince
- French Quarter (1978) - Tom / Burt
- Battlestar Galactica (1978, TV Series) - Bootes / Maga
- Wonder Woman (1978, TV series, Episode "Hot Wheels") - Otis Fiskle
- The French Atlantic Affair (1979) - Lester Foyles
- Captain America (1979) - Harley
- Magnum, P.I. (1980-1988, TV Series) - Colonel Buck Greene / Agent John W. Newton
- Buck Rogers in the 25th Century (1981, TV series, Episode "Time of the Hawk") - Flagg
- Amy (1981) - Edgar Wanbuck
- Stripes (1981) - Col. Glass
- Dynasty (1981-1982, TV Series) - Ray Bonning
- Fast-Walking (1982) - Lieutenant Barnes
- Knight Rider (1982, TV Series) - Vernon Gray
- T.J. Hooker (1983, TV Series) - Lt. Decker
- The A-Team (1983-1986, TV Series) - Colonel Roderick Decker; 20 episodes
- Airwolf (1984-1985, TV Series) - Narrator / D.G. Bogard / Noble Flowers / Sheriff J.J. Bogan
- Iron Eagle (1986) - General Edwards
- Kidnapped (1987)
- Werewolf (1987) – "Alamo" Joe Rogan (recurring role)
- Breakdown (1997) - Victor Nardi
- MacGyver (1987, Episode: "Jack in the Box") - Sheriff 'Bull' Bodine
- Star Trek: The Next Generation (1989, Episode: "The Emissary") - Capt. K'Temoc
- Nightmare Beach (1989) - Rev. Bates
- Quantum Leap (1989-1993) - Narrator
- Columbo (1992, Episode: "No Time to Die") - Police Captain
- Shadow Force (1992) - Chief Thorpe
- Two Bits and Pepper (1995) - Pepper (voice)
- The Silencers (1996) - Kirby
- Dark Breed (1996) - Cutter
- Executive Target (1997) - Moore
- Mortal Kombat Annihilation (1997) - Elder God Kojin
- Scorpio One (1998) - Sen. Treadwell
- Crusade (1999, Episode: "Each Night I Dream of Home") - Senator Jacob Redway
- Home on the Range (2004) - Junior, the Buffalo (voice)
- The Legend of Sasquatch (2006) - Cletus McNabb (voice)
- Stuntmen (2009) - Leo Supreme
- Prince Avalanche (2013) - Truck Driver (final film role, posthumous release)
