= The Hundred Pipers =

Scottish song and jig

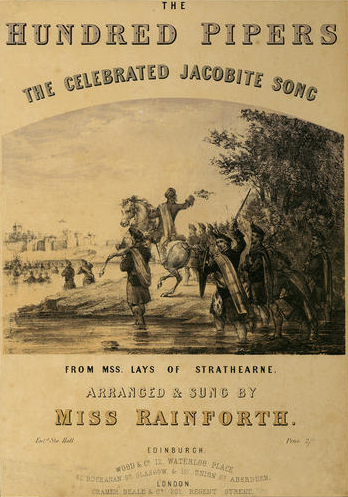
The Hundred Pipers - sheet music cover c.1852

"The Hundred Pipers" is a Scottish song and jig attributed to Carolina Nairne, Lady Nairne and popularised from 1852 onwards. It takes as its themes events during and after the Jacobite Rising of 1745.

== Historical background ==
The song commemorates the surrender of the town of Carlisle to Prince Charles Edward Stuart, on 18 November 1745, when he invaded England, at the head of a mixed army of Highlanders and Lowlanders, after his victory at Prestonpans. He "entered Carlisle on a white horse, with a hundred pipers playing before him, whose shrill music was not calculated to inspire the citizens with confidence in their grotesque conquerors", according to Burtons History of Scotland.

The episode, recorded in the fourth stanza, of two thousand Highlanders swimming the River Esk, when in flood, on the occasion of the capture of Carlise, is not quite correct. It refers to a later period, when Prince Charles made his disastrous retreat from Derby, and Carlisle had been retaken. It was Scots, and not "fell English ground" which they reached on that occasion. But Lady Nairne, by combining the two events, produced a very spirited and successful ballad, which takes a high place among later Jacobite songs.

== Composition and popularisation ==
"The Hundred Pipers" is attributed to Carolina Nairne, Lady Nairne, a prolific songwriter of the period descending from a Jacobite family. The verses appears in the second edition of her Lays from Strathern (1846).

"The Hundred Pipers" does not seem to have been printed as a song until about 1852, when it was issued at Edinburgh in sheet form, with the music arranged by Elizabeth Rainforth. Rainforth, a soprano singer, appears to have been responsible for introducing it to the public, some five or more years after Nairne's death. Rainforth lived in Edinburgh from 1851 or 1852 to 1856, and contemporary publications post reviews of her performance of the song in the capital; and she published the song with her own (and the now standard) musical arrangement in 1852.

The song does not date from the Jacobite period, as is the case with many others now considered in the "classic canon of Jacobite songs", most of which were songs "composed in the late eighteenth and nineteenth centuries, but were passed off as contemporary products of the Jacobite risings."

The tune has not been satisfactorily traced, and though it is indexed in the Lays as "Hundred Pipers", no such air is known to exist previous to the date of Lady Nairne's song.

== Contemporary versions ==
In 1998, Scottish singer Isla St Clair recorded a version of "The Hundred Pipers" sung in the old style, for her album When the Pipers Play. This version was also included in the film When the Pipers Play, aired by PBS Television in the United States.

In 1958 Lord Rockingham's XI had a Number One UK hit with "Hoots Mon!", a mainly instrumental rock 'n' roll tune (with Scots-inspired interjections including "Hoots mon! There's a moose... loose... aboot this hoose!") based on the melody of "The Hundred Pipers".

== Lyrics ==
These lyrics are in Scots.

Wi' a hundred pipers, an' a', an' a',
Wi' a hundred pipers, an' a', an' a',
We'll up an' gie them a blaw, a blaw
Wi' a hundred pipers, an' a', an' a'.
O it's owre the border awa', awa'
It's owre the border awa', awa'
We'll on an' we'll march to Carlisle ha'
Wi' its yetts, its castle an' a', an a'.
Chorus:
Wi' a hundred pipers, an' a', an' a',
Wi' a hundred pipers, an' a', an' a',
We'll up an' gie them a blaw, a blaw
Wi' a hundred pipers, an' a', an' a'.

O! our sodger lads looked braw, looked braw,
Wi' their tartan kilts an' a', an' a',
Wi' their bonnets an' feathers an' glitt'rin' gear,
An' pibrochs sounding loud and clear.
Will they a' return to their ain dear glen?
Will they a' return oor Heilan' men?
Second sichted Sandy looked fu' wae.
An' mithers grat when they march'd away.
(Chorus)

O! wha' is foremos o' a', o' a',
Oh wha' is foremost o' a', o' a',
Bonnie Charlie the King o' us a', hurrah!
Wi' his hundred pipers an' a', an ' a'.
His bonnet and feathers he's waving high,
His prancing steed maist seems to fly,
The nor' win' plays wi' his curly hair,
While the pipers play wi'an unco flare.
(Chorus)

The Esk was swollen sae red an' sae deep,
But shouther to shouther the brave lads keep;
Twa thousand swam owre to fell English ground
An' danced themselves dry to the pibroch's sound.
Dumfoun'er'd the English saw, they saw,
Dumfoun'er'd they heard the blaw, the blaw,
Dumfoun'er'd they a' ran awa', awa',
Frae the hundred pipers an' a', an' a'.
(Chorus)

A Hundred Pipers
Tune: A Hundred Pipers

== See also ==
- 100 Pipers (Whisky Brand)
