= Catch My Soul (musical) =

Jack Good's Catch My Soul Rock Othello (UK stage version)
- with the rock band Gass
- Music: Ray Pohlman; Emil Dean Zoghby
- Lyrics: Jack Good
- Book: William Shakespeare
- Basis: Othello
- Productions: The Prince of Wales Theatre, The Roundhouse, Manchester, Oxford, Birmingham

Catch My Soul is a rock musical produced by Jack Good, loosely adapted from Shakespeare's Othello. The character of Iago had originally been played by Jerry Lee Lewis in the US production which had closed in 1968. The UK production of the show was a showcase for the talents of Lance LeGault, P. P. Arnold, P.J. Proby and an introduction to the rock musician Robert Tench with the band Gass.

The first UK production opened at the University Theatre Manchester by the 69 Theatre Company with Angharad Rees as Desdemona on 14 October 1970. It toured to Birmingham, Oxford and Brighton before opening at the Roundhouse in December 1970 and then ran at the Prince of Wales Theatre in the West End from February to July 1971. The original UK cast recorded Catch My Soul (1971), The show also toured larger UK cities and closed in January 1972, with music as interpreted by Gass the show's backing band at that time. A film, Catch My Soul, was released in 1974 with a different cast.

== The plot ==
Jack Good's Catch My Soul is based on William Shakespeare's play Othello. Good's musical contained many of the elements of Shakespeare's original work and largely mirrored its source. The subsequent film version directed by Patrick McGoohan changed the structure, setting and songs to an extent that make it a substantially different work. In the synopsis for allmovie.com Sandra Brennon states that in the film story:

"Othello is a wandering evangelist who happens onto Iago's remote commune. There he marries the lovely Desdemona much to the chagrin of Iago, who also loves her. The conniving commune leader then manages to quietly pressure Othello until murder and tragedy ensue."

== Featured artists ==
Peter Knight produced the album Catch My Soul "Jack Good's Catch My Soul-Rock Othello". He was the son of another Peter Knight and produced the London version of the musical Hair (1968).

P. P. Arnold appeared as Bianca. She worked with the Small Faces and was signed to Immediate Records. Arnold also had success as a solo pop singer and backing vocalist, working with an eclectic mix of recording artists including Andy Gibb, Boy George, Roger Waters and Ocean Colour Scene. In 1984, she returned to the stage in the cast of the musical Starlight Express as Belle the Sleeping Car. In mid-2007, she released her first recorded work for several years, Five In The Afternoon. The album is a duet with The Blow Monkeys' frontman Dr. Robert.

P.J. Proby appeared as Michael Cassio. Proby later became better known for his theatrical portrayals of Elvis Presley in the musical Elvis Live, a show that Good first produced in 1977. In 1993, Proby appeared in Good's biographical musical Good Rockin' Tonite as himself. In 1994, he was in Only the Lonely, a musical based on the life of Roy Orbison.

Lance LeGault appeared as Iago, a role he played again in the 1974 Metromedia film version. Later on he appeared in his most well-known role, "Colonel Roderick Decker" in The A-Team. Le Gault also appeared in other successful television programs including Magnum, P.I., Knight Rider, Airwolf and Dallas.

== Original cast members ==
- Jack Good - Othello
- Dorothy Vernon - Emilia
- Lance LeGault - Iago
- Jeffry Wickham - Rodrigo
- P.J. Proby - Michael Cassio
- Sharon Gurney - Desdemona
- P. P. Arnold - Bianca
- Emil Dean Zoghby - Montano

Singers

- Jean Gilbert
- Dana Gillespie
- Totlyn Jackson

The Chorus

- Derek Damon
- Kevin Dean
- Karin Dominic
- Kookie Eaton
- Rodney James
- Eva Lewis
- Marcia Miller
- Vernon Pickering
- Alec Poor
- Anthony Smart
- Michael Trussel
- Sandra Wood
- Liz White

== The house band ==
British rock band Gass performed as the house band during the show's initial run. They left Catch My Soul when the show moved to the Prince of Wales Theatre in February 1971.

Band members

- Robert Tench - guitar, vocals
- Derek Austin - organ, piano
- DeLisle Harper - bass, vocals
- Godfrey McLean - drums

Robert Tench better known as Bobby Tench, also performed with the band on the London club circuit before joining the second Jeff Beck Group in May 1971. He later recorded with Linda Lewis and is best known for his work with Freddie King, Hummingbird, Humble Pie, Streetwalkers and Van Morrison.

Additional musicians

- Lennox Langton-congas
- Keith Maynard-trumpet
- John Bennett-trombone
- Phil Kenzie-tenor and baritone saxophone
- Bob Thompson-trumpet
- Geoff Driscoll-tenor saxophone, flute and tin whistle
- David Coxhill-baritone saxophone and flute
