= Jill Ireland =

British actress (1936–1990)

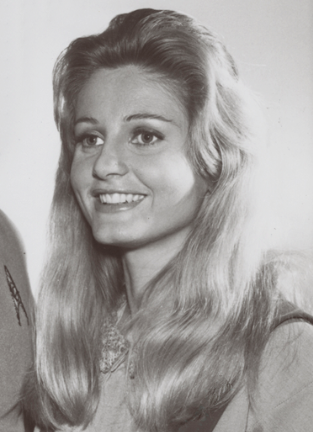
- Ireland in 1967
- Born: Jill Dorothy Ireland; 24 April 1936; Hounslow, England
- Died: 18 May 1990 (aged 54); Malibu, California, U.S.
- Occupation: Actress
- Years active: 1955–1990
- Spouses: David McCallum (m. 1957; div. 1967) Charles Bronson (m. 1968)
- Children: 5; including Val McCallum

Jill Dorothy Ireland (24 April 1936 – 18 May 1990) was an English actress.

== Early life ==
Ireland was born in Hounslow, West London, England. She was the daughter of a wine importer. She was educated at Chatsworth Junior School in Hounslow. She lived at 'Chertsey' on Maswell Park Road in Hounslow.

== Career ==
Ireland began acting in the mid-1950s with small roles in films such as Simon and Laura (1955) and Three Men in a Boat (1956). She appeared with first husband David McCallum in Robbery Under Arms and five episodes of The Man from U.N.C.L.E.: "The Quadripartite Affair" (series 1, episode 3, 1964), "The Giuoco Piano Affair" (series 1, episode 7, 1964), "The Tigers Are Coming Affair" (series 2, episode 8, 1965), and a two-parter "The Five Daughters Affair" (series 3, episodes 28 and 29, 1967).

She appeared in 16 films with second husband Charles Bronson between 1970 and 1987 and was involved in two of Bronson's other films as a producer. The last of these films, Assassination (1987), was her biggest role in terms of screen time, with Ireland playing the First Lady of the United States and Bronson a Secret Service agent assigned to protect her. During her marriage to Bronson, Ireland appeared in only one TV episode, one made-for-TV movie, and one theatrical film that did not star her husband.

== Personal life ==
In 1957, Ireland married Scottish actor David McCallum, whom she met while working on Robbery Under Arms and Hell Drivers. They had two sons including Valentine "Val" McCallum, and adopted a third son. McCallum and Ireland separated in 1965 and divorced in 1967. Their adopted son died of a drug overdose at the age of 27.

Villa Rides marked the first of many appearances by Ireland in films with her future husband, actor Charles Bronson. She had met him when McCallum and he were filming The Great Escape (1963) some years earlier. Ireland and Bronson married in 1968. Together, they had a daughter and an adopted daughter, Katrina Holden Bronson. They remained married until Ireland's death in 1990.

== Death and legacy ==
Ireland was diagnosed with breast cancer in 1984. After her diagnosis, Ireland wrote two books, chronicling her battle with the disease. At the time of her death, she was writing a third book and became a spokeswoman for the American Cancer Society. In 1988, she testified before the U.S. Congress about medical costs and was given the American Cancer Society's Courage Award by then-US president Ronald Reagan.

In 1990, Ireland died of breast cancer at her home in Malibu, California. She was cremated and her ashes were placed in a walking cane, which Charles Bronson had buried with him at Brownsville Cemetery in Vermont when he died in 2003.

For her contribution to the film industry, Ireland has a star on the Hollywood Walk of Fame at 6751 Hollywood Boulevard.

In 1991, Ireland was portrayed by Jill Clayburgh in the made-for-television film Reason for Living: The Jill Ireland Story. The film, which was based on Ireland's memoir Lifelines and listed her posthumously as an executive producer, received mixed reviews from critics. To prepare for the role, Clayburgh, who had never met Ireland, read Lifelines and listened to Ireland's recorded interviews.

== Filmography ==
Film
Year	Film	Role	Notes
1955	No Love for Judy	The Other Woman	
1955	The Woman for Joe	Bit Part	Uncredited
1955	Oh... Rosalinda!!	Lady	
1955	Simon and Laura	Burton's Receptionist	
1956	The Big Money	Doreen Frith	
1956	Three Men in a Boat	Bluebell Porterhouse	
1957	There's Always a Thursday	Jennifer Potter	
1957	Hell Drivers	Jill, Pull Inn Waitress	Alternative title: Hard Drivers
1957	Robbery Under Arms	Jean Morrison	
1959	Carry On Nurse	Jill Thompson	
1959	The Ghost Train Murder	Sally Burton	Alternative title: Scotland Yard: The Ghost Train Murder
1959	The Desperate Man	Carol Bourne	
1960	Jungle Street	Sue	Alternative title: Jungle Street Girls
1960	Girls of the Latin Quarter	Jill	
1961	So Evil, So Young	Ann	
1961	Raising the Wind	Janet	Alternative title: Roommates
1962	Twice Round the Daffodils	Janet	Alternative title: What a Carry On: Twice Round the Daffodils
1962	The Battleaxe	Audrey Page	
1967	The Karate Killers	Imogen Smythe	
1968	Villa Rides	Marsha	
1970	Twinky	Girl at airport	Uncredited
1970	Rider on the Rain	Nicole	Alternative title: Le Passager de la Pluie
1970	Violent City	Vanessa Shelton	Alternative titles: Città violenta, The Family, Final Shot
1970	Cold Sweat	Moira	Alternative title: De la part des copains
1971	Someone Behind the Door	Frances Jeffries	Alternative title: Quelqu'un derrière la porte
1972	The Valachi Papers	Maria Reina Valachi	
1972	The Mechanic	The Girl	Alternative title: Killer of Killers
1973	Chino	Catherine Maral	Alternative titles: Valdez Horses, Valdez the Halfbreed
1975	Breakout	Ann Wagner	
1975	Hard Times	Lucy Simpson	Alternative titles: Street Fighter & The Streetfighter
1975	Breakheart Pass	Marica Scoville	
1976	From Noon till Three	Amanda Starbuck	
1979	Love and Bullets	Jackie Pruit	
1982	Death Wish II	Geri Nichols	
1987	Assassination	Lara Royce Craig	
1987	Caught	Janet Devon	(final film role)
Television
Year	Title	Role	Notes
1959	The Voodoo Factor	Renee	Unknown episodes
1960	Juke Box Jury		1 episode
1961	Armchair Theatre	Sybil Vane	1 episode
1961	Kraft Mystery Theatre		1 episode
1961	Ghost Squad	Anna	1 episode
1963	Richard the Lionheart	Marianne	1 episode
1964	Ben Casey	Julie Carr	1 episode
1964	The Third Man	Julia	1 episode
1964	Voyage to the Bottom of the Sea	Julie Lyle	1 episode
1964–1967	The Man from U.N.C.L.E.	Imogen Smythe / Marion Raven / Suzanne de Serre	5 episodes
1965	My Favorite Martian	Zelda	1 episode
1965–1966	Twelve O'Clock High	Alyce Carpenter "The Hotshot"/Sara Blodgett "The Survivor"	2 episodes
1966	The Wackiest Ship in the Army		1 episode
1966	Shane	Marian Starrett	17 episodes
1967	Star Trek	Leila Kalomi	1 episode "This Side of Paradise"
1968	Mannix	Ellen Kovak	1 episode "To the Swiftest, Death"
1969	Daniel Boone	Angela	1 episode "The Traitor"
1972	Night Gallery	Ann Loring	1 episode "The Miracle at Camafeo"/"The Ghost of Sorworth Place" [second segment, "Ghost"]
1980	The Girl, the Gold Watch & Everything	Charla O'Rourke	Television film
1991	Reason for Living: The Jill Ireland Story	Executive Producer	posthumous credit, Television film inspired by Ireland's memoir Lifeline

== Books ==
- Life Wish: a Personal Story of Survival (1987) ISBN 0-515-09609-1, ISBN 0-316-10926-6
- Lifeline: My Fight to Save My Family (1989) ISBN 0-7126-2531-3, ISBN 0-446-51480-2
