= Oh Boy! (TV series) =

British teenage music TV show 1958–59

- title screen
- Original language: English

Production
- Producer: Jack Good
- Running time: 25 minutes
- Production company: ABC Weekend TV

Original release
- Network: ITV
- Release: 13 September 1958 – 30 May 1959

Related
- Boy Meets Girls (1959)

Oh Boy! is the first teenage all-music show on British TV, airing in 1958 and 1959. It was produced by Jack Good for ITV.

== Synopsis ==
Good had previously produced Six-Five Special for the BBC Television, but wanted to drop the sport and public-service content from this show and concentrate on the music. The BBC would not accept this, so Good resigned.

ABC Weekend TV allowed Good to make two pilot all-music shows, which were broadcast on the ITV network, 10.50-11.20pm, on Sunday 15 and Sunday 29 June 1958. These pilots were successful, so the programme was given an ITV slot on Saturday evenings, from 6.00pm – 6.30pm, in direct competition with 6.5 Special, but starting slightly earlier.

The hosts were Tony Hall, a jazz record producer and critic, and Jimmy Henney, and the artists covered a broad spectrum of music including ballads, jazz, skiffle and rock and roll. The show was broadcast live from the Hackney Empire.

Each week Oh Boy! featured resident artists plus a selection of special guests. The residents included Cuddly Dudley, who sang on 21 shows, Cliff Richard (20 shows), the Drifters (later to become the Shadows) (17 shows), Marty Wilde (17 shows) and the Dallas Boys (10 shows). Guests included Billy Fury, Dickie Pride, Tony Sheridan, Shirley Bassey and Lonnie Donegan; with occasional US stars, such as the Inkspots, Conway Twitty and Brenda Lee. The solo artists were supported by a specially created house band Lord Rockingham's XI, who went on to have hits in their own right, including a No 1 single "Hoots Mon". Performers were also supported by the singing and dancing of the Vernons Girls, the Dallas Boys and Neville Taylor's Cutters.

Eight episodes were re-broadcast in the US in 1959 by the American Broadcasting Company, but only three of the 38 shows (or 40 shows including the two pilots) still exist. The last of the original shows was broadcast in the UK on 30 May 1959. At the end of that final show, it was announced that the programme was taking a break for the summer but would return on 12 September. However, in the event it was a successor series also produced by Good, Boy Meets Girls starring Marty Wilde, which began its run on that date.

The show was revived in 1979 for the retro rock and roll stars of the day. This time the show included Shakin' Stevens, Alvin Stardust, Joe Brown, Lulu, Mr. Lee Grant, Freddie 'Fingers' Lee, Les Gray, Tim Whitnall, Johnny Storm (now performing with the Johnny Storm Band), the Shades and Fumble. Joe Brown was the only one of the artists who was performing across the UK in the 1950s to appear on the 1970s Oh Boy! show. Alvin Stardust first emerged on the 1950s scene as Shane Fenton and the Fentones. The presenter of the show was "GBH", alias of Scottish actor Billy Hartman.

Following the Oh Boy! TV show, a similar series, Let's Rock, was created also by Good. The shows were broadcast across Europe and in the US in the early 1980s.

== Jack Good's Oh Boy! (album) ==
Jack Good's Oh Boy!

Live album by Cliff Richard, the John Barry Seven, the Dallas Boys, Neville Taylor and the Cutters, the Vernons Girls, Vince Eager, Cuddly Dudley, Peter Elliot
- Released: December 1958
- Recorded: 19 & 21 October 1958
- Genre: Pop
- Label: Parlophone
- Producer: Harry Robinson

Jack Good's Oh Boy! is a live album made up of tracks by various artists featured on the Oh Boy! TV series. The artists include Cliff Richard, the John Barry Seven, the Dallas Boys, Vince Eager, Cuddly Dudley, Neville Taylor and the Cutters, Peter Elliot and the Vernons Girls.

The album was arranged by Oh Boy! musical director Harry Robinson and recorded by EMI's Norman Newell before a live audience on 19 October 1958, except for Cliff Richard's vocal tracks which were recorded two nights later by EMI's Malcolm Addey and added to the backing tracks recorded at the earlier session. The recordings were made at EMI's Abbey Road Studios.
