= Alfred Travers =

Turkish-born British screenwriter and film director (1906–?)

- Born: Alfred Karl Ludwig Jungermann; 1906 (age 119–120); Constantinople; Ottoman Empire
- Occupations: Film director screenwriter
- Years active: 1942–1968

Alfred Travers (born Alfred Karl Ludwig Jungermann; 1906, date of death unknown) was a Turkish-born British screenwriter and film director.

== Career ==
Travers came to England in the 1930s, and during World War II worked for the British Council and the Ministry of Information. After the war he joined British National Films. In the late 1960s he worked in South Africa directing TV commercials and wrote the book for the stage musical Eureka!

== Filmography ==
- Non Stop nach Afrika (short) (1933) (as Alfred Jungermann)
- Kuddelmuddel (short) (1934) (as Alfred Jungermann)
- Men of Tomorrow (1942)
- Glorious Colours (1943)
- Their Invisible Inheritance (short) (1945)
- Beyond the Pylons (short) (1945)
- Meet the Navy (1946)
- Dual Alibi (1947)
- The Strangers Came (1949)
- Solution by Phone (1954)
- Don Giovanni (1955)
- Alive on Saturday (1957)
- Men of Tomorrow (short) (1959)
- Girls of the Latin Quarter (1960)
- The Primitives (1962)
- Raka (1968)
- One for the Pot (1968)
