= Hoots Mon =

Single by Lord Rockingham's XI
- B-side: "Blue Train"
- Released: 1958
- Genre: Rock and roll
- Label: Decca
- Songwriter: Harry Robinson
- Producer: Harry Robinson

"Hoots Mon" is a song written by Harry Robinson, and performed by Lord Rockingham's XI. It was a number-one hit single for three weeks in 1958 on the UK Singles Chart. It is based on the old Scottish folk song, "A Hundred Pipers". It was also one of the first rock and roll songs to feature the Hammond organ, which would become popular in rock and roll music the following year with Dave "Baby" Cortez's "The Happy Organ".

The record is mostly instrumental, punctuated by four stereotypical Scottish phrases:

- "Och aye", an exclamation meaning "Oh yes."
- "Hoots mon", an expression of dismissal or annoyance.
- "There's a moose loose aboot this hoose" ("There's a mouse loose about this house"), a standard cliché highlighting Scots language pronunciation.
- "It's a braw, bricht, moonlicht nicht." ("It's a fine, bright moonlit night").

The author and journalist Benny Green played the tenor saxophone on the recording.

The song was revived by Bad Manners and included on their album, Stupidity. It was also used in a commercial for Maynards Wine Gums with the line "There's a moose loose aboot this hoose" changed to "There's juice loose aboot this hoose".

== See also ==
- List of UK Singles Chart number ones of the 1950s
- List of artists who reached number one on the UK Singles Chart
