= Jack Good (producer) =

British producer (1931–2017)

- Born: 7 August 1931; Greenford, London, England
- Died: 24 September 2017 (aged 86); Oxfordshire, England
- Education: Balliol College, Oxford
- Occupations: Television producer, musical theatre production, musician
- Years active: 1955–1997
- Employer(s): BBC Television, ABC Weekend TV, American Broadcasting Company (ABC), Jack Good Productions
- Known for: Six-Five Special, Oh Boy!, Shindig!, Catch My Soul (film), Catch My Soul (musical)
- Spouse: Margit Tischer (m. 1956; div. 1987)
- Children: Four

Jack Good (7 August 1931 – 24 September 2017) was a British television producer, musical theatre producer, record producer, musician and painter of icons. As a television producer, he was responsible for the early popular music shows Six-Five Special, Oh Boy!, Boy Meets Girls and Wham!!, the first UK teenage music programmes. Good managed some of the UK's first rock and roll stars, including Tommy Steele, Marty Wilde, Billy Fury, Jess Conrad and Cliff Richard. Jack Good portrayed the British Submarine Captain who relayed Hogan's Messages to London on Hogan's Heroes(American TV Sitcom 1966 to 1972.) Good is especially prominent in Hogan's Heroes Season 3, Episode 30 "Monkey Business."

== Early years ==
Good was born in Greenford, London, England, and was brought up in Palmers Green. His father was a piano salesman in Bond Street. Jack Good attended Trinity County Grammar School and, after national service, studied philology at Balliol College, Oxford, where he became president of the university debating society and of the college drama society.

Initially intending to become an actor, he studied at the London Academy of Music and Dramatic Art, and worked as half of a comedy double act with Trevor Peacock, before joining the BBC to work on the magazine-format show Six-Five Special. Having recently been impressed by the movie Rock Around the Clock, he wanted music and a lot of movement. To get his way, Good had sets built, but shortly before the show started, they were wheeled out of the way, and he filled the space with the milling audience and performers. Television then was live, so once the programme started, Good kept it all as impromptu as possible. The running order was sketched out on Friday morning, then the only complete run-through happened immediately before transmission. The show launched the hand jive and Good even wrote an instruction book, Hand Jive at Six-Five. None of the Six-Five Special productions shows was recorded (due to the then-existing procedure of destroying and erasing already filmed programmes to make room for new ones), but a low-budget film based on the show survives.

== Independent Television ==
Although Good had given the BBC a show that was attracting 12 million viewers, he was being paid only £18 a week. He left for independent television and launched Oh Boy! in June 1958 for the ITV franchise holder ABC Weekend TV. After trial broadcasts in the Midlands, it went national, in direct competition with Six-Five Special on Saturday evenings. Six-Five Special stuck to its mix of rock, jazz, skiffle and crooners, but Good was in his rock 'n' roll element with Oh Boy! The programmes were broadcast from the Hackney Empire, London, and made a star of Cliff Richard, as well as showcasing Billy Fury in several editions. Oh Boy! was non-stop rock and roll. Each show was 26 minutes, and no song lasted more than a couple of minutes. When ITV replaced the show on 12 September 1959 with Boy Meets Girls, people wondered whether Good had lost his touch. The 18 y/o Italian rock singer Little Tony, participated in that show. Good later claimed his wife persuaded him that rock 'n' roll was on the way out and to adopt a more middle of the road approach.

In the early 1960s, he wrote a column for Disc, a weekly UK pop magazine. He appeared on numerous TV shows such as The Monkees plus Hogan's Heroes and produced the rarely seen television special 33 1/3 Revolutions Per Monkee starring the Monkees.

== Shindig! ==
In 1964, he made a one-off programme Around the Beatles, but regular rock 'n' roll television had disappeared from British screens apart from Ready Steady Go, which made heavy use of Good's technique of building excitement and interest by allowing the audience to mill round the singers.

Good championed the rise of rhythm & blues and went to the United States in 1962, where he spent $15,000 of his own money to produce a pilot show for the American market. After trying for a year to persuade television executives to take on the show, he gave up and returned to the UK. A year later, a disc jockey gave the tape of the pilot show to an American television executive, who sent for Good. This led to the broadcasting of the first Shindig! show, first broadcast by the American Broadcasting Company (ABC) on 16 September 1964. Shindig! had a half-hour spot until January 1965, when it was extended to an hour, before switching to twice-weekly half-hour episodes in the autumn.

The show was the first to broadcast rock and roll on prime-time television. With its famous cast and flashy camera work, the show was a success. The integration of black and white artists, however, displeased some executives and affiliates, particularly those in the South. As a result, Darlene Love of the Blossoms recalled, "Even after Shindig! was a hit, [producer Jack Good] continued to get grief from the network about the 'color' of the show, and the more grief he got, the more the more black acts he booked." Occasional broadcasts were from London. Good fell out with ABC executives and walked out. The show could not survive without Good's dynamic influence and it was cancelled in January 1966 to make room for screenings of the new Batman series.

In late 1968, Screen Gems hired Good to create, write, and produce the Monkees television special 33 1/3 Revolutions Per Monkee. It aired on NBC in April 1969.

He was a subject of the British television programme This Is Your Life in March 1970 when he was surprised by Eamonn Andrews.

== Music and musical theatre ==
Good played and recorded with Lord Rockingham's XI. Their hit singles included "Fried Onions" and the better known UK singles chart chart-topper, "Hoots Mon". He also produced records by performers including The Vernons Girls, Joe Brown, and Jet Harris and most notably, Billy Fury's 1960 album The Sound of Fury, cited by AllMusic as ""the best rock & roll album to come out of England's original beat boom of the late 1950s".

He was a musical theatrical producer creating productions such as Good Rockin' Tonite. Oh Boy!, Elvis the Musical and Catch My Soul, which was also made into a film of the same name, released in 1974. He had a supporting role as an uptight naval officer in the comedy film Father Goose (1964).

== Art ==
Good converted to Roman Catholicism and devoted his time to Christianity and icon painting, including a wall painting portraying the television as the Devil. His paintings have been exhibited at the Rancho de Chimayó gallery alongside those of painter Antonio Roybal. He lived in New Mexico for many years, but returned to England to live in Oxfordshire.

== Death ==
Good died of complications from a fall in Oxfordshire on 24 September 2017, at the age of 86.
