= Six-Five Special =

- Title screen with logo
- Presented by: Pete Murray; Josephine Douglas; Freddie Mills; Jim Dale
- Theme music composer: Don Lang and His Frantic Five
- Opening theme: "The 6.5 Special's steamin' down the line, The 6.5 Special's right on time"
- Country of origin: United Kingdom
- Original language: English
- No. of episodes: 96

Production
- Producers: Jack Good, Josephine Douglas
- Running time: 55 minutes

Original release
- Network: BBC
- Release: 16 February 1957 – 27 December 1958

Six-Five Special is a British television programme launched in February 1957 when both television and rock and roll were in their infancy in Britain.

== Description ==
Six-Five Special was the BBC's first attempt at a rock-and-roll programme. Its title was derived from its broadcast time, as it aired at 6:05 on Saturday evening. It began immediately after the abolition of the Toddlers' Truce, in which programming ceased between 6 p.m. and 7 p.m. so that children could be put to bed.

Jack Good and Josephine Douglas were the show's initial producers, with Douglas and (initially) disc jockey Pete Murray as its presenters, with Murray using the catchphrase "Time to jive on the old six five." Its resident band was Don Lang and His Frantic Five. The show opened with film of a steam train accompanied by the programme's theme song, played and sung by the Bob Cort Skiffle Group, which began with the words "The Six-Five Special's comin' down the line, The Six-Five Special's right on time ..."

BBC executives originally preferred a magazine format, but Good wanted a show with music and much movement. The original sets were removed and the empty studio space filled with the milling audience and performers. Television at that time was completely live as recording technology was limited, so once the programme started, it ran in an impromptu fashion. The running order was sketched out on Friday morning, and then only one complete run-through happened immediately before transmission on Saturday evening.

The show was originally scheduled to last just six weeks but, as a result of its popularity, the series became open-ended. The BBC interfered with Good's vision of the show by including educational and information elements, which Good wanted to drop, as they diluted the music. The relationship between Good and the BBC became strained, and he resigned in early 1958.

Good joined the ITV company ABC to create Oh Boy!, which featured non-stop music and lost the public-service-inspired elements as part of its more frenzied pace, trouncing Six-Five Special in the ratings. The BBC, never keen on the Six-Five Special, took this as vindication and pulled the show.

== Stage show ==
In January and February 1958 Jack Good produced The Six-Five Stage Show, a spin-off live show which toured the UK, promoted by Harold Fielding. Presented by Josephine Douglas, Pete Murray and ex-boxer Freddie Mills the show featured performances by The John Barry Seven, Cab Kaye, The Five Dallas Boys, The Vernons Girls, Adam Faith and Kerry Martin, joined by a different "local skiffle group" in each venue. The script was by Trevor Peacock.

== Artists ==
Among the artists on the show were Petula Clark, Jim Dale, Johnny Dankworth, Terry Dene, Lonnie Donegan, Russ Hamilton, Cleo Laine, Joan Regan, Finlay Currie, boxer Freddie Mills, Wee Willie Harris, Jimmy Lloyd, Marty Wilde, the Dallas Boys and Tommy Steele.

Comedy performers included Trevor Peacock, who was also a script writer for the show, Spike Milligan and Mike and Bernie Winters.

== Film ==
A spin-off film was released in 1958, scripted by Norman Hudis and directed by Alfred Shaughnessy. It centred around a young woman's quest for stardom, played by up-and-coming musical star Diane Todd. It featured performances from Lonnie Donegan, Dickie Valentine, Jim Dale, Petula Clark, Russ Hamilton and Joan Regan, among others, and featured comic relief from Mike and Bernie Winters.

The film was one of several rock musicals that followed the success of The Tommy Steele Story. Filmink described it as being "along the lines of ensemble American jukebox rock musicals like Rock Rock Rock and Jamboree, i.e. a loose storyline stuffed with a variety of music acts."

Peter Shaugnessy wrote the film "was not exactly the sort of thing I was looking for to advance my career but it was a job and it was a musical." He claims Nat Cohen and Stuart Levy insisted Shaugnessy use the band of John Barry because Barry's father owned some cinemas in the north and he "would be sure to book the film into his cinemas" if his son's band was used.

Filming took place in December 1957.

=== Premise ===
Two women board a train to London full of musical acts.

=== Reception ===
Variety called it a "cheerful and effervescent musical."

== Notes ==
- Shaughnessy, Alfred (1997). A confession in writing. Tabb House.
