= A Windmill in Old Amsterdam =

1965 song written by Ted Dicks and Myles Rudge

- Cover of the EP: 7EG 8937

Single by Ronnie Hilton
- B-side: "Dear Heart"
- Released: 1965
- Genre: Novelty song
- Label: His Master's Voice
- Songwriters: Ted Dicks; Myles Rudge
- Producer: Walter J. Ridley

Official audio
- "A Windmill in Old Amsterdam" on YouTube

"A Windmill In Old Amsterdam" is a 1965 novelty song written by Ted Dicks and Myles Rudge. The song, about a mouse that wears clogs, and arranged in waltz time, was recorded by Ronnie Hilton in 1965 and issued on the His Master's Voice label.

The regular writing team of Dicks and Rudge also wrote novelty songs for Bernard Cribbins. The song is said to have been inspired by the sound of street organs which Dicks heard on a visit to the city.

Backed by "Dear Heart", it was released originally on His Master's Voice in January 1965. Hilton was backed by the Michael Sammes Singers and Orchestra.

The song spent a total of 13 weeks on the UK Singles Chart peaking at No. 23 in the chart of 17 February 1965. A Dutch version by Rudi Carrell was also popular at that time.

== Reception ==
Hilton was probably best known for the song, which contains the memorable chorus line "I saw a mouse. Where? There on the stair!". The song was more of a children's favourite than Hilton's earlier records and became his last hit; it would come to overshadow his career and his 16 other chart hits. It has been claimed that the single sold more than a million copies in 1965.

The song's composers were granted an Ivor Novello Award in 1966 for the Year's Outstanding Novelty Composition.

Dutch TV personality and crooner Rudi Carrell hastened to release a Dutch translation of the song, titled "Een Muis In Een Molen In Mooi Amsterdam", which was released the same year "with astonishing results", according to Billboard.

A version by Freddie and the Dreamers reached No. 27 in the Canadian Singles Chart, in November 1965. Rolf Harris recorded a version which appears on his 1979 album Rolf on Saturday Ok!
