= Ronnie Hilton =

British singer (1926–2001)

Background information
- Born: Adrian Hill; 26 January 1926; Hull, East Riding of Yorkshire, England
- Died: 21 February 2001 (aged 75); Hailsham, East Sussex, England
- Genre: Pop
- Occupations: Singer, radio presenter
- Years active: 1954–1989
- Labels: His Master's Voice, Columbia

Ronnie Hilton (born Adrian Hill; 26 January 1926 – 21 February 2001) was an English singer. According to his obituary in The Guardian newspaper, "For a time Hilton was a star – strictly for home consumption – with nine Top 20 hits between 1954 and 1957, that transitional era between 78 and 45 rpm records. A quarter of a century later he became the voice of BBC Radio 2's Sounds of the Fifties series".

A true Yorkshireman, Hilton always remained loyal to his roots – especially to Leeds United. He composed, sang and recorded several anthems as tribute to the club.

== Biography ==
Born Adrian Hill in Hull, East Riding of Yorkshire, England, Hilton left school at 14 and worked in an aircraft factory at the beginning of the Second World War, then was part of the Highland Light Infantry. Following demobilisation in 1947, he became a fitter in a Leeds sewing plant.

== Career ==
Whilst singing with local dance bands in his spare time, he made a private recording to help sell a song and this eventually reached record producer Wally Ridley. Ridley did not like the song but he liked the voice and arranged a recording session for the singer. Ridley did not like the name “Adrian Hill” either and he changed this to Ronnie Hilton for the first record release in June 1954 which was “I Wish and Wish" and "I Live For You." Later in 1954, Hilton left his safe job as a fitter in a Leeds-based engineering factory and he made his debut on the variety stage at Dudley Hippodrome in March 1955 after previously having been heard on radio and seen on television.

He came to fame by supplying smoothly delivered cover versions of popular American songs during the 1950s. His most enduring recordings were "No Other Love"; and his last chart entry in 1965 with "A Windmill in Old Amsterdam" written by Ted Dicks and Myles Rudge. The latter spent a total of 13 weeks on the UK Singles Chart, peaking at No. 23 in the chart of 17 February 1965. The song's composers were granted an Ivor Novello Award in 1966 for the Year's Outstanding Novelty Composition.

Despite the prominence of rock and roll in his recording career, he amassed a formidable array of best-sellers in the UK Singles Chart, albeit mainly with cover versions of US hit records. This was common practice at the time, and many British recording artists followed this trend. His chart single recording career alone spanned from 1954 to 1965, which flew in the face of the rapidly changing trends of pop music.

From a comparatively unknown Rodgers and Hammerstein musical, Me and Juliet written in 1953, Ronnie Hilton took the hit tune "No Other Love", and scored his one and only UK Number One hit in 1956. In securing the Number One, Hilton fought off competition from the UK-based Canadian Edmund Hockridge, and from the Johnston Brothers. Oddly, no American versions of "No Other Love" reached the UK Singles Chart at the time. Perry Como had been successful with the song in America, but his version was released much earlier in 1953, when Me and Juliet first opened on Broadway. Nevertheless, Hilton's light operatic style, similar to fellow Hullensian, David Whitfield, was already by the mid-1950s being overtaken by events. By the time "No Other Love" dropped off the UK Singles Chart, Elvis Presley had clocked up his first three UK hit singles. Hilton also performed in three Royal Variety Performances. He also took part in the inaugural A Song For Europe contest in 1957, failing in his attempt to be the UK's first representative in the Eurovision Song Contest. Hilton's chart hit in 1959, before a barren chart run covering most of the next five years, was "The Wonder of You"; the same song that Elvis Presley topped the UK chart with in 1970.

Hilton kept on performing well into the 1960s, in summer seasons and Christmas shows, and was also a regular fixture in pantomimes in Hull, at the New Theatre, but knew that his chart days were behind him. In 1967 he released a single with covers of "If I Were a Rich Man" and "The Laughing Gnome" on the A-side and B-side respectively. It did not chart. In 1968, he participated in a successful album of songs from the then newly released film, Chitty Chitty Bang Bang. This was issued on the budget Music For Pleasure label, and was his only charting album. He appeared as a guest on the BBC's Morecambe & Wise Show in June 1971.

He appeared as a guest star on Granada TV's variety show The Wheeltappers and Shunters Social Club (1974-1977 TV series) in episode 4, in 1974. He was then the top of the bill for episode 26 (series 4) on 2 August 1975 of The Wheeltappers and Shunters Social Club.

Hilton suffered a stroke in 1976, which hindered his progress for a time. He also encountered financial problems. Following his recovery, he presented Sounds of the Fifties, a nostalgic radio series for BBC Radio 2. The British Academy of Song Composers and Authors honoured him with its gold medal for services to popular music in 1989. He died in Hailsham, East Sussex from another stroke, aged 75.

He was twice married. He had three children (Geraldine, Jane and Derry) with his first wife, Joan. She died in 1985. He was married to Christine Westoll from 1989 to 2001; together they had a son, Simon (born in 1966 during their earlier affair).

== Discography ==
- "I Still Believe" (1954) – UK Chart – no. 3
- "Veni Vidi Vici" (cover of the Gaylords) (1954) – no. 12
- "A Blossom Fell" (cover of Nat King Cole) (1955) – no. 10
- "Stars Shine in Your Eyes" (1955) – no. 13
- "The Yellow Rose of Texas" (cover of Mitch Miller/Johnny Desmond) (1955) – no. 15
- "Bella Notte" (1955)
- "Young and Foolish" (1956) – no. 17
- "No Other Love" (cover of Perry Como) (1956) – no. 1
- "Who Are We" (cover of Gogi Grant) (1956) – no. 6
- "A Woman in Love" (cover of the Four Aces) (1956) – no. 30
- "Two Different Worlds" (cover of Jane Morgan) (1956) – no. 13
- "Around the World" (cover of Bing Crosby) (1957) – no. 4
- "Wonderful! Wonderful!" (cover of Johnny Mathis) (1957) – no. 27
- "Magic Moments" (cover of Perry Como) (1958) – no. 22
- "I May Never Pass This Way Again" (cover of Perry Como) (1958) – no. 27 (with the Michael Sammes Singers)
- "The World Outside" (based on the Warsaw Concerto) (1959) – no. 18 (with the Michael Sammes Singers)
- "The Wonder of You" (cover of Ray Peterson) (1959) – no. 22
- "Don't Let the Rain Come Down" (cover of The Serendipity Singers) (1964) – no. 21
- "A Windmill in Old Amsterdam" / "Dear Heart" (1965) – no. 23 (with the Michael Sammes Singers)
- "The Ballad of Billy Bremner" / "The Lads of Leeds" / "The Tale of Johnny Giles" (1971)

== See also ==
- List of Eurovision: Your Decision contestants
- Early British popular music
- List of artists who reached number one on the UK Singles Chart
- Bands and musicians from Yorkshire and North East England
