= Cuffy (TV series) =

- Genre: Sitcom
- Created by: Francis Essex
- Starring: Bernard Cribbins; Jack Douglas; Linda Hayden; Nigel Lambert; Diana King
- Theme music composer: Ed Welch
- Country of origin: United Kingdom
- Original language: English
- No. of series: 1
- No. of episodes: 6

Production
- Executive producer: Greg Smith
- Producers: Paul Harrison; Christopher Baker
- Running time: 30 minutes
- Production company: Central Independent Television

Original release
- Network: ITV
- Release: 13 March – 17 April 1983

Cuffy is a 1983 British sitcom. It spawned off from the 1980–1981 ATV comedy-drama Shillingbury Tales, and both series were created by Francis Essex. In Shillingbury Tales, the character of Cuffy appeared in two episodes and was played by Bernard Cribbins, who reprised this role, now given centre stage, for this series, alongside the rest of the main Shillingbury cast: Jack Douglas as farmer Jake, Linda Hayden as his daughter Mandy, Nigel Lambert as the Reverend Norris, and Diana King as the local spinster Mrs. Simkins.

In as much the Shillingbury Tales were made by ITC Entertainment and seen on the ITV network via its parent company ATV, Cuffy was made by ATV's successor company Central Independent Television also for the ITV network.

== Plot ==
The show revolved around the tinker Cuffy, who lived in a scruffy caravan in the fictional picturesque English village of Shillingbury. Beneath his raggy image (flat cap, grubby coat and stubble), deep underneath he had a heart of gold, although he had a tendency to get into mischief (unintentionally). The episodes revolved around some of his hapless misadventures.

== Episodes ==
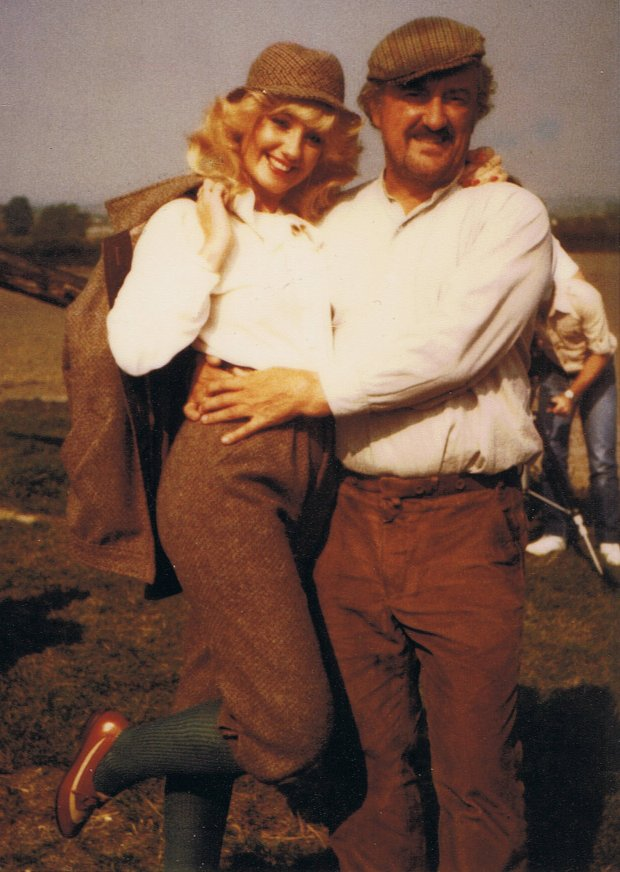
Cribbins with Susie Silvey during the filming of Cuffy

- 1. "Cuffy and a Carpetbagger" (13 March 1983)
- 2. "Cuffy and a Holiday" (20 March 1983)
- 3. "Cuffy and a Fashion Show" (27 March 1983)
- 4. "Cuffy and a Downpour" (3 April 1983)
- 5. "Cuffy and the Status Quo" (10 April 1983)
- 6. "Cuffy and a Green Eye" (17 April 1983)

== Trivia ==
The character of Cuffy was actually the brainchild of Bob Monkhouse, who was a close friend of Shillingbury creator Francis Essex, and gave it to him to include in both series.

The series' interior scenes were shot at the former ATV Elstree Studios, which were still owned by Central TV and were its production base until their new Nottingham studios were completed in November 1983, after which they sold Elstree to the BBC and made the move northwards.

== DVD release ==
The Complete Series of Cuffy was released on 3 May 2010.
