= Carry On Christmas Specials =

British television comedy programmes (1969–1973)

The Carry On Christmas Specials were four one-off specials produced for Thames Television made in 1969, 1970, 1972 and 1973. They brought most of the cast and the formula of the Carry On films to a television production. Barbara Windsor was the only one to appear in all four Carry On Christmas specials. Kenneth Williams (who appeared in twenty-six Carry On films, the most of any of the Carry On stars) did not appear in any of the Christmas specials.

== Carry On Christmas (1969) ==
=== Description ===
The first special, Carry On Christmas, was broadcast in 1969. It was filmed shortly after the completion of Carry on Up the Jungle and featured the same main cast from that film. It was scripted by long-term Carry On author Talbot Rothwell. The story was an irreverent take on Charles Dickens' A Christmas Carol, featuring Sid James as Scrooge. The 'Christmas Past' sequence reveals that Scrooge failed to invest in the schemes of Dr. Frank N. Stein, who (assisted by his servant, Count Dracula) sought to create a mate for Barbara Windsor's Monster. The 'Christmas Present' sequence described Robert Browning's difficulties in attempting to elope with Elizabeth Barrett without funds, thanks to Scrooge's unwillingness to lend. The 'Christmas Future' sequence retold the story of Cinderella.

=== Cast ===
Starring	Roles
Sid James	Ebenezer Scrooge
Terry Scott	Dr Frank N Stein, Convent Girl, Mr Barrett, Baggie
Charles Hawtrey	Spirit of Christmas Past, Angel, Convent Girl, Buttons
Hattie Jacques	Elizabeth Barrett, Nun, Passer-by
Barbara Windsor	Cinderella, Fanny, Spirit of Christmas Present
Peter Butterworth	Count Dracula, Beggar, Convent Girl, Haggie
Bernard Bresslaw	Bob Cratchit, Frankenstein's Monster, Spirit of Christmas Future, Convent Girl, Town Crier, Policeman
Frankie Howerd	Robert Browning, Fairy Godmother

== Carry On Again Christmas (1970) ==
=== Description ===
The second special, Carry On Again Christmas, was shown the following year. Rothwell did not script this episode, but Sid Colin, who had co-written Carry On Spying with Rothwell, wrote the episode with Dave Freeman, who would go on to script Carry On Behind, several episodes of the Carry On Laughing television series, and was the co-writer of the 1992 film, Carry On Columbus. Based on the Robert Louis Stevenson story Treasure Island, this episode saw the Carry On debut of Wendy Richard, who would go on to have small roles in Carry On Matron and Carry On Girls.

Although the 1969 special was broadcast in colour, the 1970 special was shown in black and white due to a technicians' strike that caused Thames Television to broadcast all their Christmas shows that year in black and white.

=== Cast ===
Starring	Roles
Sid James	Long John Sil
Terry Scott	Squire Treyhornay
Charles Hawtrey	Old Blind Pew, Night Watchman, Nipper the Flipper
Kenneth Connor	Dr Livershake
Barbara Windsor	Jim Hawkins
Bernard Bresslaw	Rollicky Bill
Bob Todd	Ben Gunn, Shipmate
Wendy Richard	Kate

== Carry On Christmas (or Carry On Stuffing) (1972) ==
=== Description ===
In 1972 a new Christmas special was produced, entitled Carry On Christmas (or Carry On Stuffing). Talbot Rothwell became ill whilst writing the script, and was unable to finish it. Dave Freeman had to be brought in to complete the script, but the two men did not work together. Charles Hawtrey pulled out of the special at short notice. Having taken third billing to Sid James and Terry Scott in the previous two shows, and knowing they would both be absent, Hawtrey demanded top billing. But Carry On producer Peter Rogers refused, giving top billing to Hattie Jacques instead. Hawtrey's role had to be hastily recast, and was split between Norman Rossington and Brian Oulton, both of whom had played cameo roles in several Carry On films. The special featured a collection of historical sketches, loosely linked around an 18th-century banquet.

It included a performance of two madrigals originally written for Carry On Henry. The songs reappeared in the 1973 stage show Carry On London.

=== Cast ===
Starring	Roles
Hattie Jacques	Maid, Miss Molly Coddle, Lady Fiona, Harriet, The Good Fairy
Joan Sims	Maid, Lady Rhoda Cockhorse, Mother, Esmeralda, Princess YoYo
Barbara Windsor	Maid, Eve, Virginia, Aladdin
Kenneth Connor	Sir Henry, Lieutenant Banghem, Hanky Poo
Peter Butterworth	Sir Francis Fiddler, Captain Dripping, Lieutenant Trembler, Hole in One
Jack Douglas	Mr Perkin, Adam, Tomkins, Ringworm, King of the Underworld
Norman Rossington	General Sir Ffingham Clodhopper, Genie
Brian Oulton	Oriental Orator
Billy Cornelius	Waiter
Valerie Leon	Serving Wench
Valerie Stanton	Demon King's Vision

== Carry On Christmas (1973) ==
=== Description ===
For the final original Christmas special, writer Talbot Rothwell returned, as did Sid James. In a modern-day setting, it features Sid James as a department store Father Christmas, whose out-of-character behaviour puts him at odds with the store manager. James also introduces sketches set in Christmases past, and a "Carry On" ballet performance.

=== Cast ===
Starring	Roles
Sid James	Sid Belcher (Santa), Seedpod, Sir Henry, Sergeant Ball, Robin Hood
Joan Sims	Mother, Sennapod, Bishop's Wife, Adelle, Salvation Army Woman, Maid Marion, Traffic Warden
Barbara Windsor	Eve, Virginia, Crompet, Lady Frances, Fifi
Kenneth Connor	Shop Manager, Anthro Pod, The Bishop, Private Parkin, Will Scarlet
Peter Butterworth	Carol Singer (2001 BC), Old Man, Darts Player, 2nd German Soldier, Friar Tuck
Bernard Bresslaw	Peapod, Camp Aristocrat, Darts Player, Captain Ffingburgh, Much, Policeman
Jack Douglas	Adam, Carol Singer (2001 BC), Crapper, 1st German Soldier, Ballad Singer
Julian Holloway	Captain Rose
Laraine Humphrys	Bed Customer

== Carry On Laughing's Christmas Classics (1983) ==
Kenneth Williams and Barbara Windsor introduce some of the funniest moments from the later Carry On films, in a format very similar to the film That's Carry On!.

== DVD release ==
In 2005, the first four specials were released on DVD, featuring interviews with series producer Peter Rogers and stars Jack Douglas and Wendy Richard.
