= Right Said Fred (song) =

Single by Bernard Cribbins
- B-side: "Quietly Bonkers"
- Released: 29 June 1962
- Studio: Abbey Road Studios
- Genre: Novelty
- Length: 2:20
- Label: Parlophone
- Songwriters: Ted Dicks and Myles Rudge
- Producer: George Martin

Bernard Cribbins singles chronology
"The Hole in the Ground" (1962)	"Right Said Fred" (1962)	"Gossip Calypso" (1962)

"Right Said Fred" (also written "Right, Said Fred") is a novelty song of 1962 written by Ted Dicks and Myles Rudge.

It is about three moving men (Fred, Charlie, and the unnamed narrator) trying without success to move a large and unwieldy piece of furniture from an apartment. The item has feet, a seat, handles and candleholders and is never identified but is often interpreted as being a piano. In the animated film version (see below) it is depicted as such; however, in the 1970 television performance of the song on the sketch show Cribbins it is depicted as a kind of small pipe organ.

The movers eventually give up after dismantling the piece of furniture and partially demolishing the building – including removing a door, a wall, and the ceiling – and taking numerous tea breaks.

The lyrics do not specify whether Fred recovers from "half a ton of rubble on the top of his dome" (slang for head) prior to the others having a final tea break and going home. Dicks said that he was inspired to write the song by events that transpired when he employed movers to move a grand piano he had bought. The band Right Said Fred is named after the song.

== Recorded versions ==
"Right Said Fred" was recorded as a single by Bernard Cribbins and released by Parlophone in 1962. It reached number 10 on the UK singles chart. Cribbins recorded it at the Abbey Road Studios with musical accompaniment, directed by Johnnie Spence.

Sound effects were added by the producer George Martin, who would later become famous for his work with the Beatles.

A short animated film based on the song was produced in the early 1960s. Made in black and white for television using stop motion animation, it depicts the three workmen as puppets (modified from commercially available Bendy toys manufactured by Newfeld Ltd.), animated by Bura and Hardwick.

The B-side is the comedy love song "Quietly Bonkers", another Dicks-Rudge composition.

The song was also recorded in 1966 by Tommy Quickly. That version was produced by Brian Epstein and backed by Ian Whitcomb, Jimmy Page, and the Blue Flames. Rowan & Martin's Laugh-In actress Judy Carne also recorded a version of the song as the B-side of her single "Sock It to Me", which was released on Reprise Records in May 1969.

Also recorded by Gordon Bok and Cindy Kallet in a sea-shanty style on their 1996 album Neighbors on Timberhead Music.

== See also ==
- The Music Box: a Laurel and Hardy comedy short that depicts a similar scenario.
