= Gossip Calypso =

Single by Bernard Cribbins
- B-side: "One Man Band"
- Released: 15 December 1962
- Studio: Abbey Road Studios
- Genre: Calypso, novelty
- Label: Parlophone
- Songwriter: Trevor Peacock
- Producer: George Martin

Bernard Cribbins singles chronology
"Right Said Fred" (1962)	"Gossip Calypso" (1962)	"The Bird On The Second Floor" (1963)

"Gossip Calypso" is a novelty calypso song written by Trevor Peacock. It was recorded by Bernard Cribbins and released by EMI on the Parlophone label in 1962. The musical accompaniment was directed by Johnnie Spence, and the producer was George Martin. It reached number 23 in the UK Singles Chart, and was Cribbins' third top 30 hit of the year.

The lyrics repeat the conversations between several female neighbours describing the latest news of themselves, their families and other neighbours, joined by the chorus:

Gossip calypso
Gossip calypso
Hear all about it
Yak, a-yak, yak

Every woman
Up at the window
Giving out the gossip and
Getting it back

The slang used and names and situations mentioned imply the neighbours are in Britain rather than the Caribbean. The song is part of the early 1960s British calypso craze.
