= Myles Rudge =

English songwriter and scriptwriter (1926–2007)

Background information
- Born: Myles Peter Carpenter Rudge; 8 July 1926
- Origin: Bristol, England
- Died: 10 October 2007 (aged 81)
- Genres: Folk, popular music
- Occupations: Songwriter, scriptwriter
- Years active: 1960–1992

Myles Peter Carpenter Rudge (8 July 1926 – 10 October 2007) was an English songwriter, known for writing the lyrics for novelty songs. His songs "The Hole in the Ground" and "Right Said Fred" were both British Top 10 chart hits in 1962, both recorded by Bernard Cribbins to music by Ted Dicks and produced by George Martin for Parlophone. Another of his songs, "A Windmill in Old Amsterdam", was a hit in 1965 for Ronnie Hilton, and won an Ivor Novello Award in 1966 for the Year's Outstanding Novelty Composition.

== Life and career ==
Rudge was born in Bristol, England, where his father was an advertising copywriting clerk. He was educated at Bristol Grammar School, where a friend and classmate was playwright Peter Nichols. Rudge became an actor, working in at the Bristol Old Vic and Liverpool Playhouse. He served in the Royal Navy during and immediately after the Second World War, from 1944 to 1947. He joined RADA after the Navy, and worked in repertory. Tall and blond, he delivered the line "Who's for tennis?" in Julian Slade's musical Salad Days at the Vaudeville Theatre. In 1957, he played an estate agent, in You Pay Your Money.

He left acting to write comedy scripts for television and radio. With composer Ted Dicks, he wrote songs and sketches for West End revue shows, including And Another Thing, which had a long run at the Fortune Theatre in 1960, featuring Bernard Cribbins, Anna Quayle, and Lionel Blair and Joyce Blair. One of the show's songs, "Folk Song", became a hit for Cribbins, produced by George Martin, and led to them collaborating on the top 10 hits in the UK Singles Chart, "The Hole in the Ground" and "Right Said Fred". Noël Coward chose "The Hole in the Ground" as one of his records on Desert Island Discs, saying he would pass the time on his desert island by translating it into French. Richard and Fred Fairbrass adopted "Right Said Fred" as the name of their pop group.

Rudge and Dicks also wrote the theme song for the film Carry On Screaming (1966), and worked with Kenneth Williams on an album entitled On Pleasure Bent (1967). Other songs written by Rudge were recorded by Topol, Val Doonican, Matt Monro, Joan Sims, Jim Dale and Petula Clark.

Rudge wrote several scripts for BBC television in the 1960s, including scripts for the soap opera Compact. He also wrote two series of Stop Messing About (1969), a follow-on radio comedy to Round the Horne with Kenneth Williams, and (with Ronnie Wolfe) three series of Something to Shout About (1960–62), a BBC radio sitcom set in an advertising agency. With Vince Powell, he co-wrote a religious sitcom Father Charlie (1982), starring Lionel Jeffries and Anna Quayle. He also wrote pantomime scripts, particularly for the Glasgow Citizens Theatre. Rudge was a volunteer for the Samaritans.
