= The Hole in the Ground (song) =

1962 single by Bernard Cribbins

Single by Bernard Cribbins
- B-side: "Winkle Picker Shoes"
- Released: 1962
- Recorded: 22 December 1961
- Studio: EMI, London
- Genre: Comic song
- Label: Parlophone
- Songwriter: Ted Dicks
- Lyricist: Myles Rudge
- Producer: George Martin

Bernard Cribbins singles chronology
"Folk Song" (1960)	"The Hole in the Ground" (1962)	"Right Said Fred" (1962)

"The Hole in the Ground" is a comic song written by Myles Rudge and composed by Ted Dicks. When recorded by Bernard Cribbins and released by EMI on the Parlophone label in 1962, it was a number nine hit in the UK Singles Chart. It remains the highest charting and most successful of Cribbins' hit singles, staying on the chart for 13 weeks. The musical accompaniment was directed by Gordon Franks, and the producer was George Martin.

The song is about a dispute between a workman digging a hole and an officious busybody wearing a bowler hat. This exemplifies British class conflict of the era and Cribbins switches between a working class Cockney accent, in which he drops his aitches, and a middle class accent for the gentleman in the bowler hat.

Don't dig there, dig it elsewhere.
You're digging it round and it ought to be square.
The shape of it's wrong, it's much too long,
And you can't put a hole where a hole don't belong.

The official ends up being buried in the hole.

== Reception ==
Noël Coward, who wrote many comic songs himself, chose the record in 1963 as one of his eight Desert Island Discs, and as his favourite track out of the eight. He said: "I think the only one I would never get sick of is "Hole in the Ground", because I could translate it into French as I walked up and down on the beach."
