= Shillingbury Tales =

- Genre: Comedy drama
- Created by: Francis Essex
- Starring: Robin Nedwell; Diane Keen; Lionel Jeffries; Bernard Cribbins; Jack Douglas; Patrick Newell; Joe Black; Nigel Lambert; Diana King; Trevor Howard
- Theme music composer: Ed Welch
- Country of origin: United Kingdom
- Original language: English
- No. of series: 1
- No. of episodes: 7

Production
- Executive producer: Greg Smith
- Producers: Paul Harrison; Christopher Baker
- Running time: 50 minutes
- Production company: ITC Entertainment for ATV

Original release
- Network: ITV
- Release: 6 January 1980 – 21 June 1981

Shillingbury Tales is a British television comedy-drama series made by ATV for ITV and broadcast 1980–81.

Comprising a single feature-length pilot, 'The Shillingbury Blowers ', starring Trevor Howard, and six one-hour episodes, the series deals with life in an idealised English village and stars Robin Nedwell, Diane Keen, Nigel Lambert, Jack Douglas, John Le Mesurier, and Bernard Cribbins.

Unusually for a British sitcom at that time, it was recorded entirely on location on 16mm film, and consequently there was no laugh track. Much of the filming took place in the village of Aldbury, Hertfordshire. However, the idea of the show was based on the town Kirkby-In-Ashfield, Nottinghamshire

The show ended when ATV lost its franchise licence to broadcast, and its replacement Central declined to continue production of the series. The series was broadcast in a number of countries around Europe.

== Episodes ==
=== Pilot / prequel ===
- The Shillingbury Blowers (6 January 1980) is a feature-length film (79 minutes – 90 mins with adverts) starring Robin Nedwell as writer and musician Peter Higgins and Diane Keen as his wife.

Newly-weds Peter, (Nedwell), and his wife Sally, (Keen), have moved into Rose Cottage, an idyllic half-timbered cottage in the small English village of Shillingbury, close to the village church and the pub, the Oddfellows' Arms. The local brass band, the Shillingbury Blowers, is struggling to survive. A meeting of the village council, headed by John Le Mesurier, looks at the financial position of the band and debates the poor quality of the playing. Peter is brought in to replace the ageing conductor. Peter tells the band they are awful and they walk out.

A second meeting of the village council with two band members results in a work-to-rule, where the band decide to remove all individuality. Ironically this solves the problem and the band get their first clap. When they reconvene in the pub, they resolve to play with further restrictions. When they then decide to play staccato it unintentionally works very well. When the now very unconfident old bandleader, Saltie (Trevor Howard), is persuaded to return, he plays lead trumpet very melodically, which works in counterpoint works very well.

Peter helps Jake (Jack Douglas), the lead cornet, deliver a calf on his farm and a new bond of trust is formed. This night-time ordeal causes Jake to oversleep and he misses the bus taking the band to a competition. He catches up in time and convinces the band to cease their work to rule and return to their original style of playing, which whilst disastrous musically, results in a very much happier band of men.

=== Series 1 ===
- "The Shillingbury Tinker" (17 May 1981)
- "The Shillingbury Melon" (24 May 1981)
- "The Shillingbury Cloudburst" (31 May 1981)
- "The Shillingbury Legend" (7 June 1981)
- "The Shillingbury Miracle" (14 June 1981)
- "The Shillingbury Daydream" (21 June 1981)

== Cuffy ==
In 1983, a spin-off sequel series entitled Cuffy was made and broadcast by ATV's successor Central. The show this time was about Bernard Cribbins's eponymous character but did not feature Robin Nedwell or Diane Keen.

== DVD release ==
The show was released on DVD by Network in 2005.
