= Ted Dicks =

English composer (1928–2012)

Edward Dicks (5 May 1928 – 27 January 2012) was an English composer. He is best known for composing the music for the novelty songs "Right Said Fred" and "The Hole in the Ground". They were both Top 10 hits in the UK Singles Chart in 1962, recorded by Bernard Cribbins with lyrics by Myles Rudge, and produced by George Martin for Parlophone. Another song by Dicks and Rudge, "A Windmill in Old Amsterdam", was a million-seller hit in 1965 for Ronnie Hilton.

== Life and career ==
Dicks was born in Muswell Hill, North London, England. His father was a postman. Dicks was educated at Tollington Grammar School and Hornsey School of Art and then undertook two years national service in the RAF. He won a scholarship to the Royal College of Art, where he became friends with Len Deighton. Dicks later concentrated on composing music, but continued to paint in later life.

While working as a teacher in the 1950s, Dicks composed a stage show Let's Go Mad, which had a short run at the Fortune Theatre in London's West End in 1960 under the title Look Who's Here!, featuring Nyree Dawn Porter, Donald Hewlett and Anna Quayle. Dicks collaborated with Barry Cryer, and then with Myles Rudge. Dicks and Rudge wrote the revue And Another Thing which had a long run at the Fortune Theatre in 1960, featuring Bernard Cribbins, Anna Quayle, Lionel Blair, and Joyce Blair.

Music producer George Martin liked the show, and released a single of Cribbins singing one of the show's songs, "Folk Song". Martin commissioned Dicks and Rudge to write other comic songs for Cribbins, and the next two tunes, "Hole in the Ground" and "Right Said Fred", were both top 10 hits in 1962. Martin praised the "clever lyrics" written by Myles Rudge and the "quirky melodies" written by Dicks. Noël Coward chose "Hole in the Ground" as one of his records on Desert Island Discs, saying he would pass the time on his desert island by translating it into French. Richard and Fred Fairbrass adopted "Right Said Fred" as the name of their pop group.

Dicks and Rudge also wrote "A Windmill in Old Amsterdam" which was a hit for Ronnie Hilton in 1965 and won an Ivor Novello Award in 1966 for the Year’s Outstanding Novelty Composition. Other examples of their collaborative output were Petula Clark's "The Happiest Christmas", Val Doonican's "Annabelle", and their ballad "Other People" was on the B-side of Matt Monro's "Born Free". They also wrote the theme song for the 1966 film Carry On Screaming, and an album that was recorded by Kenneth Williams under the title On Pleasure Bent in 1967. Other songs by Dicks and Rudge were recorded by Jim Dale, Joan Sims and Topol.

His solo work included "Busy Boy", the theme tune to the classic 1970s children's television series Catweazle, and the scores to the films Clinic Exclusive (1971) and Virgin Witch (1972). Dicks also wrote scripts for the television soap operas Compact and Crossroads.

He was survived by his wife and their son.
