= Diana King (actress) =

British actress (1918–1986)

- King in Fawlty Towers (1975)
- Born: Diana Jane King; 2 August 1918; Buckinghamshire, England
- Died: 31 July 1986 (aged 67); Nettlebed, Oxfordshire, England
- Occupation: Actress
- Years active: 1939–1986
- Spouse: John Harvey (m. 1940; died 1982)

Diana King (2 August 1918 – 31 July 1986), also known as Diane King, was an English actress who had a career on British television from 1939 to 1986. Born in Buckinghamshire, in August 1918, she attended the Fay Compton School of Drama, and was a prolific theatre performer during and after World War Two.

== Television roles ==
King's first television appearance was as a pupil of Tadworth House School in Little Ladyship in 1939. She continued to appear on television and in films throughout the 1940s and 1950s. In 1961, she appeared in The Avengers.

From the 1960s to the early 1980s, she appeared in The Benny Hill Show, Crossroads, Dixon of Dock Green, Pride and Prejudice, You're Only Young Twice and Z-Cars.

King was perhaps best known for her many appearances in situation comedies from the 1960s onwards. She had roles in Dad's Army, Father, Dear Father, The Liver Birds, Fawlty Towers (in the episode "The Wedding Party"), George and Mildred, Bless This House, Rising Damp, Come Back Mrs. Noah and Some Mothers Do 'Ave 'Em. She also had semi-regular roles in Are You Being Served? as Mrs Peacock, in Terry and June replacing the late Joan Benham in the role of Melinda Spry, as Norah in Bachelor Father and as George's mother in Marriage Lines. She appeared in Follow Me from 1978 to 1981, with Francis Matthews as moderator.

Her final television appearance was in Inside Story, which was shown in 1986, the year she died of cancer in Nettlebed, Oxfordshire, two days before her 68th birthday.

== Partial filmography ==
=== Film ===
Year	Title	Role	Notes
1941	Spellbound	Amy Nugent	Also known as Passing Clouds and The Spell of Amy Nugent
1957	A Farewell to Arms	Hospital Receptionist	Uncredited
1958	A Night to Remember	First Class passenger	Uncredited
1965	Die! Die! My Darling!	Woman Shopper	
1967	They Came from Beyond Space	Mrs Trethowan	
1970	Some Will, Some Won't	Mrs Craik	
1980	The Shillingbury Blowers	Mrs Simpkins	
1980	The Wildcats of St Trinian's	Miss Mactavish	
1982	Pink Floyd - The Wall	Wedding Witness	

=== Television ===
Year	Title	Role	Notes
1958	Time Out for Peggy	Norma Burke	5 episodes
1959	The Scarf	Marian Hastings	5 episodes
1961	Hancock's Half Hour	Mrs Humphries	Episode: "The Lift"
1964–1966	The Marriage Lines	Mrs Starling	11 episodes
1966	A Game of Murder	Iris Bannister	4 episodes
1967	Pride and Prejudice	Lady Lucas	5 episodes
1967–1968	The Very Merry Widow	Mavis Anstruther	8 episodes
1968	Point Counter Point	Janet Bidlake	3 episodes
1970–1971	Bachelor Father	Norah	5 episodes
1972	My Wife Next Door	Suzy's mother	3 episodes
1975	Fawlty Towers	Rachel Lloyd	Episode: "The Wedding Party"
1976; 1981; 1983	Are You Being Served?	Mrs Peacock	3 episodes
1977	Rising Damp	Mrs Armitage	Episode: "The Cocktail Hour"
1977–1981	You're Only Young Twice	Mildred Fanshaw	31 episodes
1980–1981	Shillingbury Tales	Mrs Simpkins	3 episodes
1982–1983	Terry and June	Melinda Spry	3 episodes
1983	Cuffy	Mrs Simpkins	5 episodes
