= Wally Ridley =

- Born: Walter John Ridley; 28 February 1913; St Pancras, London, England
- Died: 23 January 2007 (aged 93) Datchet, Berkshire, England
- Genres: Traditional pop; comedy
- Occupations: Record producer; promoter; songwriter
- Years active: 1928–1984
- Label: His Master's Voice

Walter John Ridley (28 February 1913 – 23 January 2007) was a British record producer and songwriter. Primarily associated with traditional pop music especially in the 1950s, he produced hit records by Alma Cogan, Max Bygraves, Ronnie Hilton and many others, and later provided UK number one hits for Benny Hill and the pairing of Windsor Davies and Don Estelle.

== Biography ==
=== Early life ===
Ridley was born in St Pancras, London. He started learning piano as a child, and helped in his father's general store by demonstrating pianos for sale. By the age of nine, he performed at local functions, and at 13 won a scholarship to the Northern Polytechnic Institute to learn about piano making.

=== Early career ===
He joined the Feldman music publishing company in 1928, and demonstrated songs in the company's catalogue to musicians and performers. He met Ted Shapiro who encouraged him to write songs, and his first published song, "The One Little Hair on His Head", written with veteran songwriter Harry Castling, was recorded by Gracie Fields.

In 1935, Ridley started work as manager at Peter Maurice Music, where he promoted songwriters such as Jimmy Kennedy and Michael Carr. During the Second World War he coached singer Vera Lynn, accompanying her on broadcasts and at auditions, including her successful one with Joe Loss, and introducing her to her biggest hit song, "We'll Meet Again". He also saw potential in ventriloquist Peter Brough, persuading him to change his dummy to Archie Andrews, and winning him a regular show on BBC radio, Educating Archie. The programme, written by Eric Sykes and Sid Colin, made household names of Beryl Reid, Max Bygraves and Tony Hancock, and reached over 15 million listeners. The theme tune, "Powder Your Face With Sunshine", was sung by Donald Peers, another Ridley discovery.

=== Gramophone Company (EMI) / His Master's Voice ===
Ridley joined the Gramophone Company in 1948, when its parent company EMI wanted to develop Gramophone's His Master's Voice sub-label beyond its existing classical music range. As A&R manager and producer, he signed existing stars including Joe Loss, Donald Peers and Max Bygraves to the label, and encouraged new talent, including Alma Cogan – promoted by Ridley as "the girl with the giggle", and the most successful British female singer of the 1950s – as well as Rosemary Squires, Ronnie Hilton, the Mike Sammes Singers, and Malcolm Vaughan. As well as becoming a successful record producer, Ridley also continued to write songs, including "I'm in Love for the Very First Time", written with Paddy Roberts for Jeannie Carson in the film An Alligator Named Daisy.

Ridley was also responsible for deciding which American records should be released on His Master's Voice label in the UK. Though it was not to his personal taste, or that of his superiors in EMI, he insisted on the company releasing Elvis Presley's "Heartbreak Hotel" in 1956; it rose to number two on the UK Singles Chart. He also signed rock and roll band Johnny Kidd and the Pirates, and later the Liverpool beat group The Swinging Blue Jeans, to the label, but delegated production of their sessions to his assistant, Peter Sullivan.

In the 1960s, Ridley increasingly worked mainly with variety acts and comedians. He was the producer of the Black and White Minstrel Show albums by the George Mitchell Minstrels, as well as records by Andy Stewart and the Deep River Boys. He produced Bernard Bresslaw's hit "Mad Passionate Love"; found the song "Bring Me Sunshine" for Morecambe and Wise; and produced Benny Hill's 1971 UK number one hit, "Ernie (The Fastest Milkman in the West)", and the equally successful 1975 remake of "Whispering Grass" by comic actors Windsor Davies and Don Estelle.

=== Later life ===
He retired from EMI in 1977, but later worked occasionally on projects, including the production of José Carreras' 1984 album Love Is....

=== Death ===
Ridley died in Datchet, Berkshire in 2007, aged 93. His wife Libusé pre-deceased him; they had two daughters and a son.
