= Carry On Columbus =

1992 British comedy film by Gerald Thomas

- Original UK quad poster
- Directed by: Gerald Thomas
- Written by: Dave Freeman; John Antrobus
- Produced by: John Goldstone; Peter Rogers (executive producer)
- Starring: Jim Dale; Bernard Cribbins; Maureen Lipman; Peter Richardson; Alexei Sayle; Jack Douglas; Rik Mayall; Charles Fleischer; Larry Miller; Leslie Phillips; Julian Clary; Sara Crowe; Rebecca Lacey; Nigel Planer; June Whitfield; Richard Wilson
- Cinematography: Alan Hume
- Edited by: Chris Blunden
- Music by: John Du Prez
- Production company: Island World
- Distributed by: United International Pictures
- Release date: 2 October 1992
- Running time: 91 minutes
- Country: United Kingdom
- Language: English
- Budget: £2.5 million
- Box office: £1.7 million

Carry On Columbus is a 1992 British comedy film directed by Gerald Thomas and written by Dave Freeman and John Antrobus. The 31st and final release in the Carry On film series, it starred Carry On regular Jim Dale in the title role, alongside a range of younger actors associated with alternative comedy.

The Carry On series had stalled since the negative critical reception to 1978's Carry On Emmannuelle. Following several unrealised attempts to reignite the series, the filmmakers were inspired by the high budget films which were being released to commemorate the 500th anniversary of Christopher Columbus' arrival in the Americas.

Critical reaction to the film was largely negative, with reviewers particularly commenting upon the script, which had been quickly written to meet the tight production schedule. Scholars have observed the incongruity of progressive alternative comedians performing in a Carry On film.

== Plot ==
Christopher Columbus believes he can find an alternative route to the far East and persuades King Ferdinand and Queen Isabella of Spain to finance his expedition. But the Sultan of the Ottoman Empire, who makes a great deal of money through taxing the merchants who have to pass through his country on the Silk Road, sends his best spy, Fatima, to wreck the trip...

== Cast ==
- Jim Dale as Christopher Columbus
- Bernard Cribbins as Mordecai Mendoza
- Maureen Lipman as Countess Esmerelda
- Peter Richardson as Bart Columbus
- Alexei Sayle as Achmed
- Rik Mayall as The Sultan
- Sara Crowe as Fatima
- Julian Clary as Don Juan Diego
- Keith Allen as Pepi the Poisoner
- Leslie Phillips as King Ferdinand
- Jon Pertwee as the Duke of Costa Brava
- Richard Wilson as Don Juan Felipe
- Rebecca Lacey as Chiquita
- June Whitfield as Queen Isabella
- Nigel Planer as The Wazir
- Larry Miller as The Chief
- Jack Douglas as Marco the Cereal Killer
- Andrew Bailey as Genghis
- Burt Kwouk as Wang
- Philip Herbert as Ginger
- Tony Slattery as Baba the Messenger
- Martin Clunes as Martin
- David Boyce as Customer with ear
- Sara Stockbridge as Nina the model
- Holly Aird as Maria
- James Faulkner as Tomas de Torquemada

== Production ==
=== Development ===
The Carry On series had ended in 1978 following the negative critical reception and box office failure of Carry On Emmannuelle. Plans to reignite the series with projects such as Carry on Down Under, Carry on Dallas, and Carry on Again Nurse did not come to fruition. However, when Carry On director Gerald Thomas and film producer John Goldstone's attempts to reignite the Bing Crosby/Bob Hope Road to movies, which were popular in the mid-twentieth century, stalled, they began to return their attention to the Carry On franchise. With several films being released in 1992 to commemorate the 500th anniversary of Christopher Columbus' 1492 arrival in America, Goldstone realised that the subject would be a good fit for a Carry On revival. Thomas, according to a later interview with his daughter, though that Columbus would work with a "new generation" and wanted to encourage younger talent. Goldstone, known for his work on Monty Python's Life of Brian and The Rocky Horror Picture Show would produce Columbus; Peter Rogers, who had produced all of the previous Carry On films, gave the project his blessing, and is credited as executive producer'.

The project developed with some speed so that the film could be released in 1992. Comedy writer Dave Freeman, who had previous written 1975's Carry On Behind and several episodes of the Carry on Laughing television series, was tasked with writing the screenplay within three weeks so that the film could be released in summer 1992. John Antrobus, who had written Carry on Sergeant, also contributed to the script. Freeman would later express unhappiness with his experience of the project, relating that he has been "pushed and shoved in all direction by the producer and director", and how he could have done a "better job" with more time.

=== Casting ===
Many of the series core cast members had died by the time Carry on Columbus was in pre-production. When Robbie Coltrane declined the offer to play the title role, Jim Dale agreed to play Columbus to bring 'star power', out of affection and loyalty to the series and its producer and director. Surviving members such as Barbara Windsor, Kenneth Connor and Joan Sims declined the minor supporting roles that they were offered. Windsor, who had refused to play in the explicit Carry On Emmannuelle, was particularly critical of the script, labelling it as a "bad Confessions film, crude and awful" rather than the double entendres of the style of the McGill saucy postcards which the Carry On films were known for. Windsor says that she conferred with Sims and Bresslaw, who both felt the same. Windsor rejected a further draft of the script, branding it "still appalling", and in her autobiography refutes rumours that she had declined because she was unhappy at not receiving residuals from the Carry On television compilations. However, some sources claim that Windsor and Bernard Bresslaw were unable to appear because they were already committed to a Blackpool summer show called Wot A Carry On in Blackpool from May 1992, with rehearsals in London potentially clashing with filming.

In her autobiography, Joan Sims says that she had "little enthusiasm" to appear in Columbus when asked by Gerald Thomas, and was "relieved" that she could tell him "in all honesty" that filming clashed with other commitments, particularly the BBC sitcom On the Up. Veteran Carry On performer Frankie Howerd was signed up to play the King of Spain, but he died in April 1992 shortly before production started; his role was played by Leslie Phillips.

Several actors who had previously appeared in the series, Jack Douglas, Peter Gilmore, Bernard Cribbins, Leslie Phillips, Jon Pertwee, and June Whitfield, were included in the cast. Due to a miscommunication with his wife, Pertwee initially assumed he had been offered a part in 1492: Conquest of Paradise (1992), and was disappointed to read the script cover sheet. Goldstone drew upon his connections with 'a new generation of comedians' including Peter Richardson, Alexei Sayle, Rik Mayall, and Nigel Planer (from The Comic Strip), alongside Julian Clary, Tony Slattery and Richard Wilson. As a Carry On fan, Harry Enfield declined the offer to play Columbus's brother because he thought it odd that so many of the original cast were not involved.

=== Filming ===
The film was shot between 21 April and 27 May 1992 at Pinewood Studios, Buckinghamshire and Frensham Common in Surrey. The latter location was previously used nearly 30 years earlier for the similarly nautical Carry On Jack.

As with previous Carry On films, director Gerald Thomas retained the discipline to ensure that production kept to schedule, with the "new faces" instructed that the script was "the bible" with no space or time for "scene-stealing ad libs". Goldstone reflects that Thomas' organisation, "confidence and happiness" lead to a positive atmosphere on set. Julian Clary and Marc Sinden both reported having a "lovely time" on set. In his autobiography, Clary reports his frustration at Jim Dale's boasting of his "Broadway triumphs", but otherwise described filming as "a hoot". However, others have reported a gulf between the veteran Carry On actors and the new generation; Goldstone attributed to established friendships amongst the older stars, while Jim Dale reported the veteran Carry On actors felt like "outsiders" because the younger actors "all had their little in-jokes".

The score was composed by John Du Prez. A rap song, written and produced by ex-Sex Pistols manager Malcolm McLaren with Lee Gorman, was recorded by Forbidden Planet with vocals by Jayne Collins and Debbie Holmes; this song plays over the film's end credits.

== Release and reception ==
The film was premiered on 2 October 1992 at the Odeon Leicester Square, attended by Jim Dale and Gerald Thomas. The film was classified as PG by the British Board of Film Classification and released on VHS in 1993 by Warner Home Video in the UK.

Critical reception was mainly negative. Writing for Sight and Sound, Andy Medhurst says that the film "is not the disaster it might have been" but its "timidity" is disappointing, and that it is "a text of pleasure rather than pure bliss". Medhurst later reflected that Columbus was a Carry On "in name only" without its most recognisable stars, a sentiment reflected by critics such as Mervyn Cooke and Frances Gray. Variety's Derek Elley commends Alan Hume's "bright and handsome" cinematography, and how the tight editing helps Thomas' "no-frills" direction. However, Elley is critical of a script which he says begins "weakly", and while it contains the expected double entendres, the "by-the-numbers comedy lacks the conviction of old". Other critics also derided the script, with Nigel Andrews branding it "bare of wit", and The Independent's Sheila Johnston labelling the screenplay as "third-rate", and lamenting that "most of the entendres are distressingly singular."

Michael Dwyer in The Irish Times described Carry on Columbus as a "flaccid, feeble comeback effort" and a "wretched and pathetic attempt which is singularly unfunny". Scholar Asela Laguna compares Carry on Columbus positively to the BBC's comedy Bye, Bye, Columbus, commending "the introduction of an international intrigue" when the Sultan of Turkey finds out that Columbus "is planning to find a new route to Asia from Portugal". Another scholar, James Chapman, reflects upon the incongruity of alternative comedians, characterised as "non-discriminatory, non-racist, and non-sexist", in a Carry On film.

Despite the critical reception, Carry On Columbus took more money at the UK box office (£1,667,249) than the two other Columbus films released in 1992 (John Glen's Christopher Columbus: The Discovery and Ridley Scott's 1492: Conquest of Paradise), although all three films flopped. Carry On Columbus was also shot on a much lower budget than the other two films, a budget of £2.5 million compared to the other two budgets of $45 million and $47 million respectively.

In a 2004 poll of British film actors, technicians, writers and directors on British cinema, Carry On Columbus was voted the worst British film ever made. In a 2018 retrospective on the series, the British Film Institute named Carry On Columbus as one of the series' five worst films, alongside Carry On Girls (1973), Carry on England (1976), That's Carry On! (1977), and Carry On Emmannuelle (1978).

== Bibliography ==
- Chapman, James (2012). "A Short history of the Carry On films". In Hunter, I.Q.; Porter, Laraine (eds.). British Comedy Cinema. Taylor & Francis. pp. 100–116.
- Clary, Julian (2006). A Young Man's Passage. London: Ebury Publishing. ISBN 9780091908720.
- Cooke, Mervyn (2023). "Carry On Regardless: The Musical Humour of Eric Rogers". In Audissino, E; Wennekes, E (eds.). The Palgrave Handbook of Music in Comedy Cinema. Palgrave Macmillan. pp. 255–273.
- Dwyer, Michael (2 October 1992). "Film Reviews". The Irish Times. p. 13.
- Frost, Caroline Mary (2022). Carry On Regardless: Getting to the bottom of Britain's Favourite Comedy Films. Pen and Sword Books. ISBN 9781526774781.
- Fryer, Ian (2023). Carrying On: The Carry Ons and Films of Peter Rogers and Gerald Thomas. Fonthill Media Ltd. ISBN 9781781559062.
- Gray, Frances (2004). "Female performance in Carry On films". In Wagg, Stephen (ed.). Because I Tell a Joke Or Two Comedy, Politics and Social Difference. Palgrave Macmillan.
- Laguna, Asela R. (2011). "The Myth and the Legend: in Search of Christopher Columbus in Film". L'ATALANTE: International Film Studies Journal (12): 98.
- Medhurst, Andy (1992). "Carry On Columbus". Sight and Sound (Oct 1992). London: British Film Institute: 48.
- Medhurst, Andy (2007). A National Joke: Popular Comedy and English Cultural Identities. Taylor & Francis.
- Ross, Robert (1996). The Carry On Companion. London: Batsford. ISBN 9780713479676.
- Sims, Joan (2001). High Spirits. London: Corgi Books. ISBN 9780552147637.
- Webber, Richard (2009). 50 Years of Carry On. London: Arrow. ISBN 978-0099490074.
- Windsor, Barbara (2021). All of Me: My Extraordinary Life. London: Headline. ISBN 978-1472287007.
