= Bernard Cribbins =

British actor (1928–2022)

Bernard Cribbins OBE
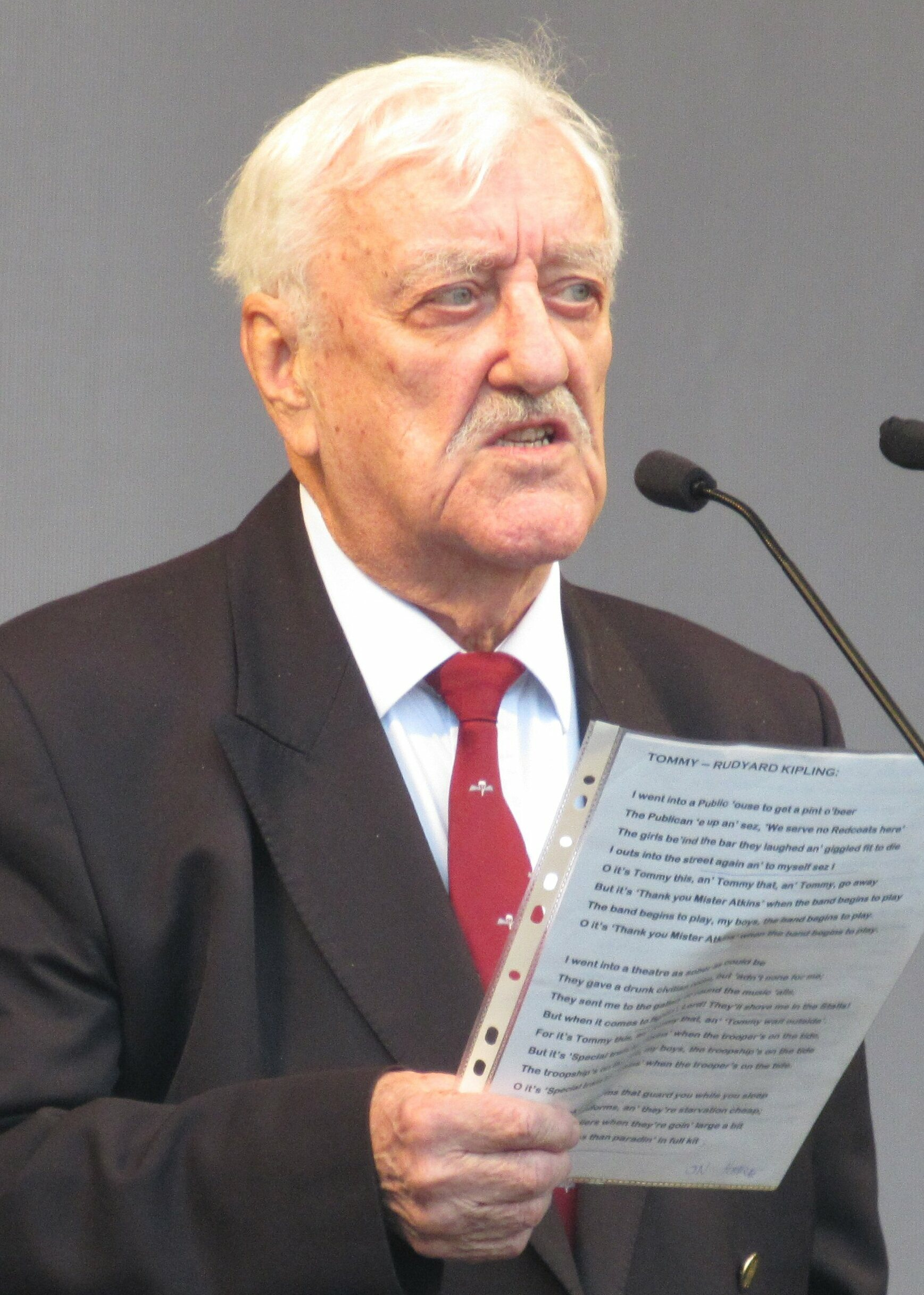
- Cribbins giving a reading of Rudyard Kipling's poem "Tommy" in 2015
- Born: Bernard Joseph Cribbins; 29 December 1928; Derker, Lancashire, England
- Died: 27 July 2022 (aged 93); Watford, Hertfordshire, England
- Resting place: Woking Crematorium, Woking, Surrey, England
- Occupations: Actor; singer
- Years active: 1940–2022
- Spouse: Gillian McBarnet (m. 1955; died 2021)
- Military career
- Allegiance: United Kingdom
- Branch: British Army
- Service years: 1946–1949
- Rank: Private
- Units: Parachute Regiment; 2nd Battalion, Parachute Regiment; 3rd Battalion, Parachute Regiment
- Conflicts: Palestine Emergency

Bernard Joseph Cribbins (29 December 1928 – 27 July 2022) was an English actor and singer whose career spanned over eight decades.

During the 1960s, Cribbins became known in the UK for his successful novelty records "The Hole in the Ground" and "Right Said Fred" and for his appearances in comedy films including Two-Way Stretch (1960) and the Carry On series. His other screen roles include the astronaut Vincent Mountjoy in The Mouse on the Moon (1963), Albert Perks in The Railway Children (1970), the barman Felix Forsythe in Alfred Hitchcock's Frenzy (1972) and the pretentious hotel guest Mr Hutchinson in the Fawlty Towers episode "The Hotel Inspectors" (1975). On television, he was a regular and prolific reader for the BBC series Jackanory from 1966 to 1991, he narrated the children's programme The Wombles (1973–1975) and he played the title role in the CBeebies series Old Jack's Boat (2013–2015).

In the 1966 film Daleks' Invasion Earth 2150 A.D., Cribbins portrayed Tom Campbell, a companion to Dr. Who. 41 years later, he began appearing in the revival series of Doctor Who as Wilfred Mott, the grandfather of regular companion Donna Noble and a temporary companion to the Tenth Doctor. He made his final appearance posthumously in the 60th anniversary special "Wild Blue Yonder" (2023), having filmed his scene shortly before his death in July 2022.

== Early life ==
Bernard Joseph Cribbins was born on 29 December 1928 in the Derker area of Oldham, Lancashire, the son of First World War veteran John Edward Cribbins (1896–1964) and Ethel (née Clarkson; 1898–1989), a cotton weaver. He had two sisters, alongside whom he grew up close to poverty. He described his father, who was of Irish descent, as a "jack of all trades" who also dabbled in acting.

Cribbins left school at the age of 13 and found a job as an assistant stage manager at a local theatre club, where he also took on some small acting roles, and then served an apprenticeship at the Oldham Repertory Theatre. In 1947, he began national service with the Parachute Regiment in Aldershot, Hampshire, including a posting to Mandatory Palestine.

== Career ==
=== Early career ===
Cribbins made his first West End theatre appearance in 1956 at the Arts Theatre, playing the two Dromios in A Comedy of Errors, and co-starred in the first West End productions of Not Now Darling, There Goes the Bride and Run for Your Wife. In 1960, he starred alongside Anna Quayle and Lionel Blair in the revue And Another Thing, written by Ted Dicks and Myles Rudge. The show brought Cribbins to the attention of Parlophone head George Martin, who signed Cribbins to the label to record a single of a satirical song from the show titled "Folk Song". Subsequently, Rudge and Dicks were asked to provide new material for Cribbins; their compositions "The Hole in the Ground", about an annoyed workman who eventually buries a harasser, and "Right Said Fred", about three workmen who struggle to move an unspecified heavy and awkward object into or out of a building (later also the name of a pop novelty band who named themselves after the song), were top ten hits on the UK Singles Chart in 1962. The third and final Cribbins single of the year "Gossip Calypso", written by Trevor Peacock, was another top 30 hit.

=== Films ===
Cribbins appeared in films from the early 1950s, mainly comedies. His credits include Two-Way Stretch (1960) and The Wrong Arm of the Law (1963) with Peter Sellers, Crooks in Cloisters (1964) and three Carry On films – Carry On Jack (1963), Carry On Spying (1964) and Carry On Columbus (1992). His other appearances include the second Doctor Who film Daleks' Invasion Earth 2150 A.D. (1966) as Special Police Constable Tom Campbell; She (1965); Casino Royale (1967) as Carlton Towers, a British Foreign Office official, The Railway Children (1970) as Mr Albert Perks, the station porter and the Alfred Hitchcock thriller Frenzy (1972) as Felix Forsythe, the Covent Garden pub landlord. His later films include Dangerous Davies – The Last Detective (1981), Blackball (2003) and Run for Your Wife (2012).

=== Narration and voice work ===
Cribbins was the narrator of the British animated children's television series The Wombles from 1973 to 1975 and also played the character of the Water Rat in a BBC Radio adaptation of The Wind in the Willows. He was the celebrity storyteller in more episodes of Jackanory than any other personality, with a total of 114 appearances between 1966 and 1991. He also narrated the audio tape of the Antonia Barber book The Mousehole Cat. From 1974 to 1976, Cribbins narrated Simon in the Land of Chalk Drawings.

In the 1960s Cribbins provided the voice of the character Tufty in RoSPA road safety films. He also provided the voice of Buzby, a talking cartoon bird that was the mascot for the Post Office. He also appeared in advertisements for Hornby model trains. In 1978, he provided one of two voiceovers in the electricity safety public information film Play Safe. The other voice artist was Brian Wilde; Wilde voiced the owl and Cribbins voiced the robin. In 1981, Music for Pleasure released a Swallows and Amazons audio book on tape cassette, read by Cribbins, abridged by Edward Phillips.

From 1987 to 1991, Cribbins starred as Jimmy Bright alongside Frank Thornton as Russell Farrow in Mind Your Own Business on BBC Radio 2, which also starred Annette Crosbie.

Cribbins also provided the voiceover work for A Passion For Angling, starring Chris Yates and Bob James (1993). In 1996, he played Puddleglum the marshwiggle in Brian Sibley's BBC Radio adaptation of C. S. Lewis's The Silver Chair. In 2013, he played Old Bailey in the radio adaptation of Neverwhere, dramatised by Dirk Maggs and in 2015 he was among an ensemble cast in an audio production of The Jungle Book, in which he played the White Cobra.

=== Television ===
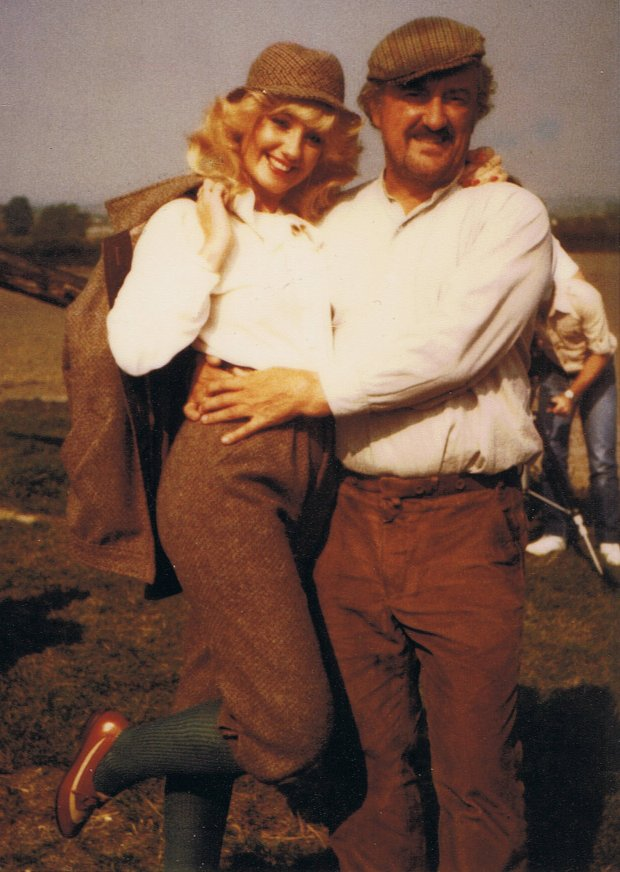
Cribbins with Susie Silvey during the filming of Cuffy

Cribbins was the star of the ITV series Cribbins (1969–70). His other TV appearances include The Avengers (1968), Fawlty Towers (1975, as the spoon salesman Mr Hutchinson who is mistaken by the character Basil Fawlty for a hotel inspector), Worzel Gummidge (1980), Shillingbury Tales (1980) and its spin-off Cuffy (1983). Besides voicing The Wombles, Cribbins was a regular on BBC children's television in the 1970s as host of performance panel game Star Turn and Star Turn Challenge.

These programmes concluded with Cribbins narrating a detective story as recurring character "Ivor Notion", with a script usually by Johnny Ball but sometimes by Myles Rudge, the co-writer of his Top 10 singles. He starred in the BBC's 1975 Christmas production Great Big Groovy Horse, a rock opera based on the story of the Trojan Horse shown on BBC2 alongside Julie Covington and Paul Jones. It was later repeated on BBC1 in 1977. He regularly appeared on BBC TV's The Good Old Days recreating songs made famous by the great stars of Music Hall.

Among his later TV appearances were Dalziel and Pascoe (1999), Last of the Summer Wine (2003), Coronation Street (2003, as Wally Bannister) and Down to Earth (2005).

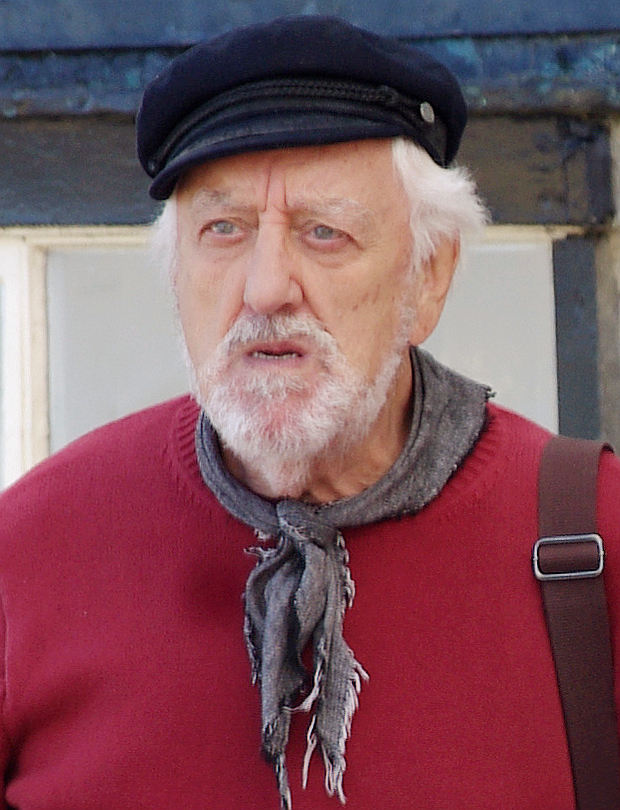
Cribbins filming Old Jack's Boat in 2012

Cribbins starred as Jack in the series Old Jack's Boat, set in Staithes, and broadcast on the CBeebies channel starting in 2013. The cast included Helen Lederer, Janine Duvitski and former Doctor Who companion Freema Agyeman in supporting roles. Although Agyeman and Cribbins both played companions and supporting characters during David Tennant's tenure in Doctor Who (appearing in six episodes together), Old Jack's Boat was the first time the two actors had appeared together on screen. On 9 May 2015, Cribbins gave a reading at VE Day 70: A Party to Remember in Horse Guards Parade, London, which was broadcast live on BBC1. He made his final on screen appearance as Wilfred Mott in the second 60th anniversary episode Wild Blue Yonder in December 2023; although he was due to appear in the third of the three episodes and more material had been written for him, Cribbins was too ill and so this became his only scene.

In November 2018, it was announced that Cribbins would portray Private Godfrey in a series of re-creations of lost episodes from the BBC sitcom Dad's Army. However, Cribbins left the production in February 2019 citing "personal reasons". The role of Godfrey was later played by Timothy West.

=== Later stage career ===
Cribbins' later theatre credits include the roles of Nathan Detroit in Guys and Dolls at the National Theatre, Moonface Martin in Anything Goes with Elaine Paige at the Prince Edward Theatre, Dolittle in My Fair Lady at the Houston Opera House, Texas and Watty Watkins in George Gershwin's Lady, Be Good at the Regent's Park Open Air Theatre and on tour. He also appeared in numerous pantomimes. He appeared in the BBC CBeebies Proms (Number 11 & 13) at the Royal Albert Hall on Saturday 26 & Sunday 27 July 2014 as Old Jack.

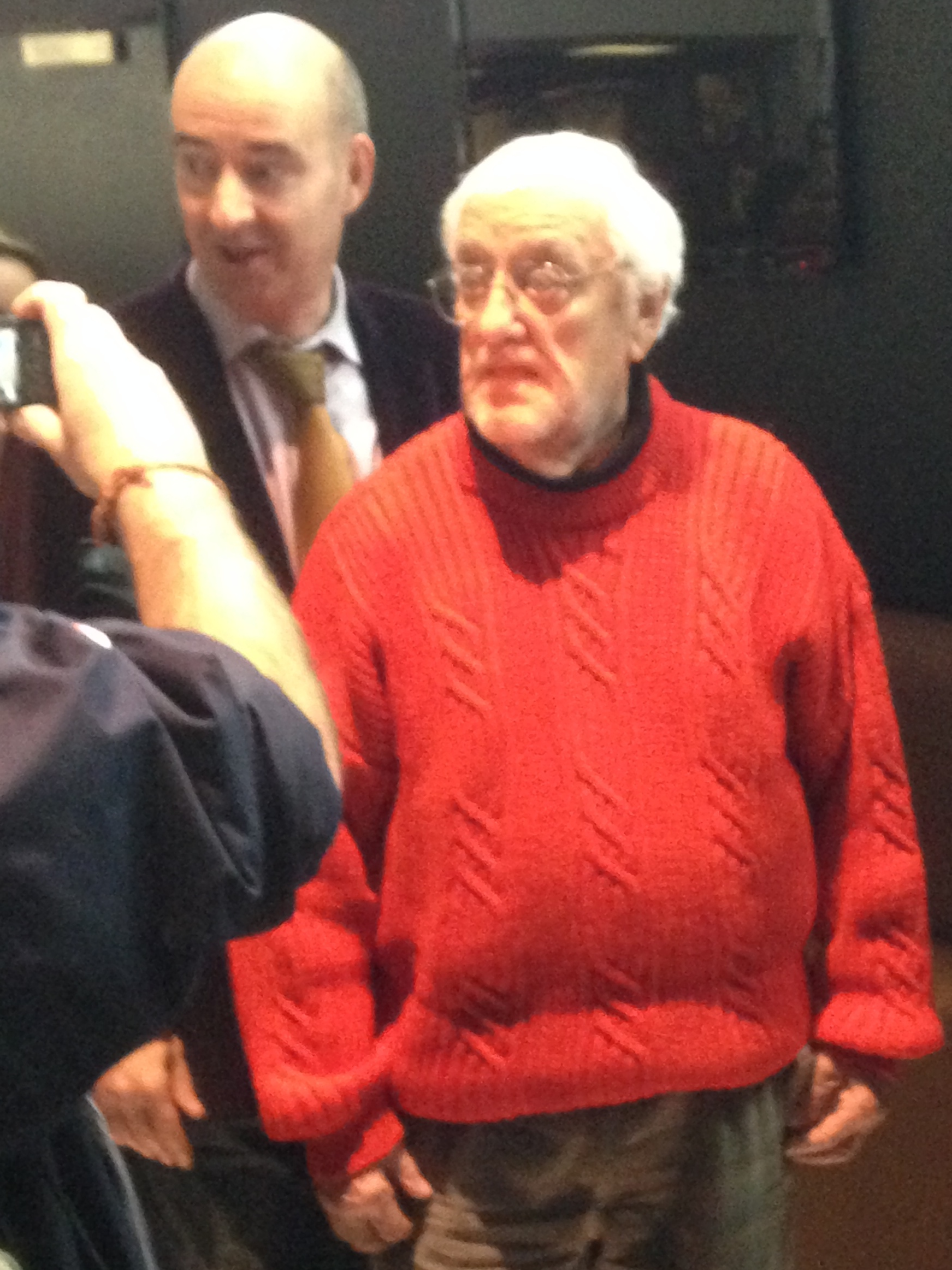
Cribbins with Nicholas Briggs at the Doctor Who 50th Anniversary Celebration Weekend in 2013

National Life Stories conducted an interview (C1173/14) with Cribbins on his memories of Richard Negri in 2006 for its An Oral History of Theatre Design collection held by the British Library.

=== Doctor Who ===
Having played Tom Campbell, a companion to Dr. Who in the feature film Daleks' Invasion Earth 2150 A.D. (1966), Cribbins returned to Doctor Who in 2006, when a photograph of him and fellow Doctor Who actor Lynda Baron at a wedding appeared on the BBC's tie-in website for the television episode "Tooth and Claw".

In January 2007, Cribbins had a guest role as glam rock promoter Arnold Korns in Horror of Glam Rock, a Doctor Who audiodrama by Big Finish Productions. In December 2007, he appeared as Wilfred Mott in the Christmas television special, "Voyage of the Damned" (although in the closing credits, his character was named as "Stan"); he then appeared in a recurring capacity as Wilfred Mott for the 2008 series, as the grandfather of companion Donna Noble. He became a Tenth Doctor temporary companion himself in "The End of Time", the two-part 2009–10 Christmas and New Year special, when his character was inadvertently responsible for that Doctor's demise. Cribbins's role as Wilfred Mott makes him the only actor to have played two companions and the only actor featured in both the TV and cinema versions of Doctor Who. In 2019, he reprised the role of Wilfred in "No Place" a story in The Tenth Doctor Adventures produced by Big Finish. In 2022, Cribbins was reported to be returning to Doctor Who alongside David Tennant and Catherine Tate for the programme's 60th anniversary specials. His appearance, in "Wild Blue Yonder" (2023), aired posthumously; the episode was dedicated to his memory.

== Honours ==
Cribbins was awarded the General Service Medal, with clasp "Palestine 1945–48", for his service in Palestine with 2/3 Battalion, the Parachute Regiment, on 30 May 1948, under Army Order 146 of 1947.

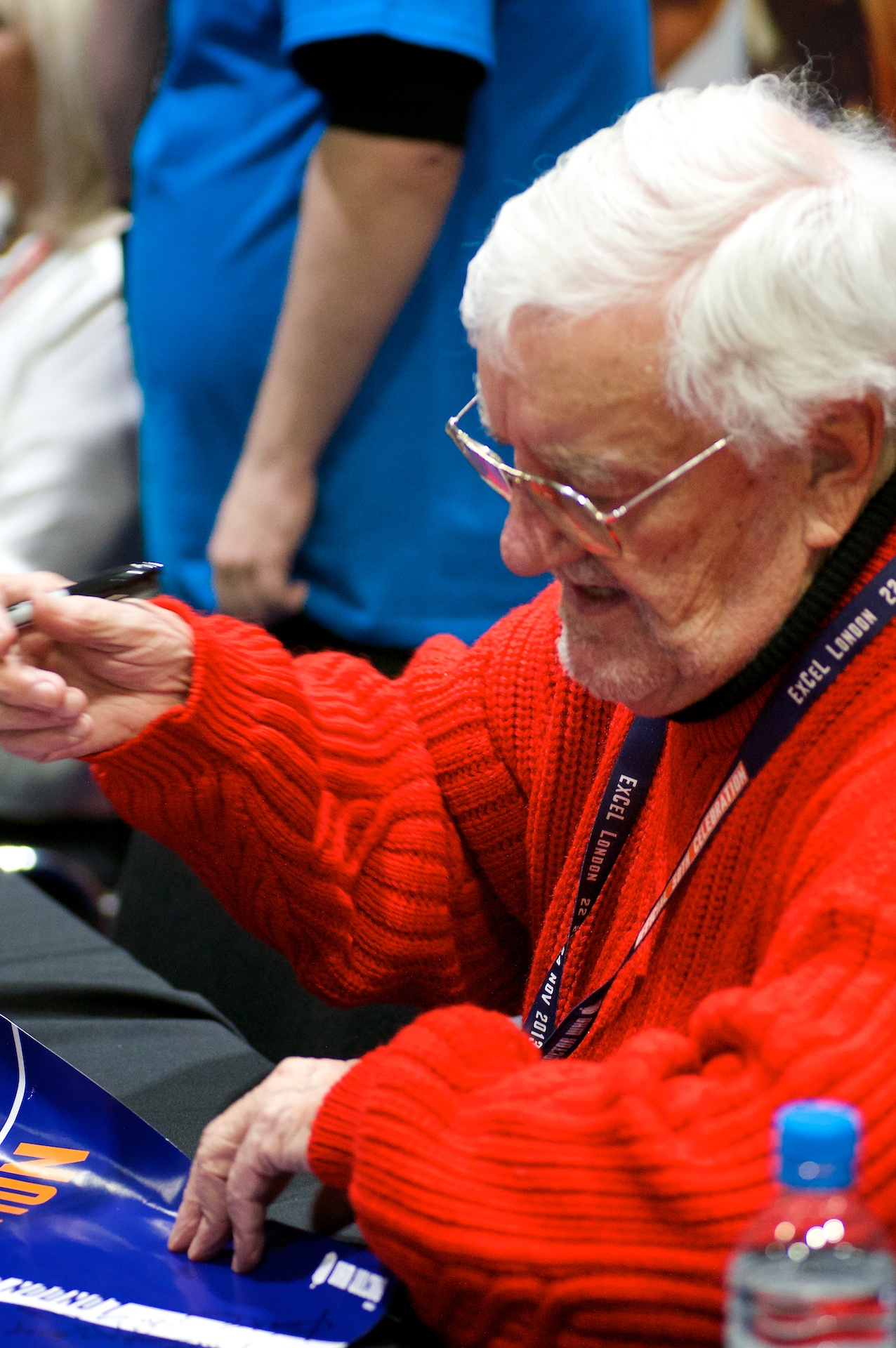
Cribbins signing autographs at the Doctor Who 50th Anniversary Celebration Weekend in 2013

In 2009, Cribbins was honoured for his work in children's television with a Special Award at the British Academy Children's Awards, which was presented by former co-star Catherine Tate, who portrayed his character's granddaughter in Doctor Who. He was appointed Officer of the Order of the British Empire (OBE) in the 2011 Birthday Honours for services to drama. He received his OBE insignia from the Princess Royal at an investiture in the Waterloo Chamber at Windsor Castle on 3 November 2011. In 2014, he was awarded the J. M. Barrie award for his "lasting contribution to children's arts".

Cribbins was named "British Icon of the Week" on 23 December 2020 by BBC America.

== Personal life and death ==
In 1955, Cribbins married Gillian McBarnet, an assistant stage manager; the couple remained together until her death on 11 October 2021. They lived in Weybridge, Surrey, and had no children, with Cribbins revealing in 2018 that they "lost one quite early on and that was the only time [they] got near it". He was diagnosed with prostate cancer in 2009, but said in 2018 that he was "in good health" at the age of 90 with the exception of a "nagging back condition".

Cribbins avidly enjoyed fishing. He narrated the 1993 BBC Two documentary series A Passion for Angling and the 2008 documentary series Catching the Impossible; in the latter, he also fished onscreen alongside expert angler Martin Bowler.

In 2018 his autobiography, Bernard Who? 75 Years of Doing Just About Anything, was published by Constable. A successful social media campaign in 2022 led to his autobiography being recorded as an audiobook, with Cribbins as the narrator, but recording was incomplete at the time of his death, and the book was released with a narration by Gordon Griffin.

Cribbins died at Watford General Hospital in Hertfordshire, at the age of 93, on 27 July 2022. (Note: The Guardian and People reported that Cribbins died on 27 July; the latter cited a statement from his agent. Other journalistic sources reported that he died on 28 July, the date his death was announced.) His funeral took place at Woking Crematorium in Surrey on 14 September.

== Filmography ==
=== Film ===
Films
Year	Title	Role
1957	Yangtse Incident: The Story of H.M.S. Amethyst	Sonar Operator/1st Cribbage Player
1958	Davy	Stage Hand, Collins's Music Hall
1958	Dunkirk	Thirsty Sailor
1959	Make Mine a Million	Jack
1959	Tommy the Toreador	Paco
1960	Two-Way Stretch	Lennie Price
1960	The World of Suzie Wong	Otis
1961	Passport to China	Pereira
1961	Nothing Barred	Newspaperman
1961	The Best of Enemies	Soldier
1962	The Girl on the Boat	Peters
1962	The Fast Lady	Man on Stretcher
1963	The Wrong Arm of the Law	Nervous O'Toole
1963	The Mouse on the Moon	Vincent Mountjoy
1963	Carry On Jack	Midshipman Albert Poop-Decker
1964	A Home of Your Own	The Stonemason
1964	Carry On Spying	Harold Crump
1964	Crooks in Cloisters	Squirts
1964	The Counterfeit Constable	Bob, l'agent 202
1965	She	Job
1965	Cup Fever	Policeman
1965	You Must Be Joking	Sgt. Clegg
1966	The Sandwich Man	Harold – Photographer
1966	Daleks' Invasion Earth 2150 A.D.	Tom Campbell
1967	Casino Royale	Carlton Towers, Taxi Driver
1968	A Ghost of a Chance	Ron
1968	Don't Raise the Bridge, Lower the River	Fred Davies
1969	The Undertakers	Mr. Rigor
1970	The Railway Children	Albert Perks
1972	Frenzy	Felix Forsythe
1978	The Water Babies	Mr. Masterman/Voice of Eel
1978	The Adventures of Picasso	Gertrude Stein/Narrator
1978	Play Safe	Robin (voice)
1981	Dangerous Davies – The Last Detective	Dangerous Davies
1992	Carry On Columbus	Mordecai Mendoza
2003	Blackball	Mutley
2012	Run for Your Wife	Hospital patient
2012	A Fantastic Fear of Everything	The Voice
2018	Patrick	Albert
2018	Woodland	Narrator

=== Television ===
Year	Title	Role	Notes
1956	The Black Tulip	Prince's Guard	
1956	David Copperfield	Thomas Traddles	
1957	The Vise	Driver	
1959	Theatre Night	Kiki Reger	Episode: "Hook, Line and Sinker"
1960	Interpol Calling	Sid	Episode: "Slow Boat to Amsterdam"
1960	The Army Game	Peanuts Perry	
1960	International Detective	Pasquale	
1960	ITV Play of the Week	Cpl. Pearce	Episode: "The Night of the Big Heat"
1961	Winning Widows		
1961-1962	BBC Sunday-Night Play	Lord Fancourt Babberley/Ghost of Sir Simon de Canterville	2 episodes: "Charley's Aunt" and "The Canterville Ghost"
1962-1970	Comedy Playhouse	Cakebread/Mr. Spooner/Ambrose Twomby/Arnold/Jimmy Sampson	5 episodes
1963-1964	Drama 61-67	Ernest Skinner/Henry Hutchins	2 episodes: "A Love of Treason" and "The Close Prisoner"
1965	The Troubleshooters	Chas Wilson	Episode: "Driver of the Year"
1966-1968	The Avengers	Arkwright/Bradley Marler	2 episodes
1966–1991	Jackanory	Storyteller	114 appearances
1967	Mr. Aitch	Nifty	Episode: "Reunion"
1967	Theatre 625	Larry	Episode: "The Loser"
1967-1968	Armchair Theatre	Charlie Baker/Honeybone	Episodes: "Another Branch of the Family" and "The Wind in a Tall Paper Chimney"
1969–1970	Cribbins	Various	12 episodes
1973–1975	The Wombles	Narrator and Voices	60 episodes
1973	Ooh La La!	Petypon	Episode: "The Lady from Maxim"
1975	Fawlty Towers	Mr. Hutchinson	Episode: "The Hotel Inspectors"
1975	The Sooty Show		2 episodes
1976	Space: 1999	Captain Michael	Episode: "Brian the Brain"
1976	Simon in the Land of Chalk Drawings	Narrator	24 episodes
1976	Jackanory Playhouse	King Ferdinand	Episode: "The Sleeping Princess"
1977	Play of the Month	Pinchwife	Episode: "The Country Wife"
1977	Once Upon a Classic	Pyramid	Episode: "Night Ferry"
1979	The Plank	House Painter	TV film
1981	Shillingbury Tales	Cuffy	2 episodes
1981	Worzel Gummidge	Jolly Jack	Episode: "The Golden Hind"
1982	It's Your Move	Neighbour	TV film
1983	Tales of the Unexpected	Charlie Krebs	Episode: "The Memory Man"
1983	Cuffy	Cuffy Follett	6 episodes
1983	Moschops	Narrator	13 episodes
1985	Alice in Wonderland	Mock Turtle	Voice role, 1 episode
1986	Langley Bottom	Seth Raven	6 episodes
1987	High & Dry	Ron Archer	7 episodes
1987	Super Gran	Officer P. Brain	Episode: "Supergran and the Birthday Dambuster"
1987	When We Are Married	Herbert Soppitt	TV film
1987	Edward and Friends	Voices	
1988	Stories of the Sylvanian Families	Narrator	4 episodes
1988	The Russ Abbot Show	Various	Episode: "The Russ Abott Christmas Show"
1990	Bertie the Bat	Narrator	10 episodes
1991	Tonight at 8.30	Mr. Wadhurst	Episode: "Hands Across the Sea"
1991	Noel's House Party	Victor the Vicar/Mad Dog	6 episodes
1993	I, Lovett	Snowman	Voice; Episode: "The Snowman"
1996	Dennis and Gnasher	Clint Katzenberger	Voice; Episode: "Oil Strike"
1999	Dalziel and Pascoe	Uncle Henry	Episode: "Time to Go"
2000	The Canterbury Tales	Carpenter	Voice; Episode: "The Journey Back"
2003	Last of the Summer Wine	Gavin Hinchcliffe	Episode: "In Which Gavin Hinchcliffe Loses the Gulf Stream"
2003	Barbara	Frank	Episode: "Guy Fawkes"
2003	Coronation Street	Wally Bannister	11 episodes
2005	Down to Earth	Frank Cosgrove	3 episodes
2006	The Children's Party at the Palace	Station Guard	
2007–2010, 2023	Doctor Who	Wilfred Mott	10 episodes; 2023 episode "Wild Blue Yonder" broadcast posthumously
2013–2015	Old Jack's Boat	Old Jack	All 47 episodes
2014	Midsomer Murders	Duggie Wingate	Episode: "The Flying Club"
2015	New Tricks	DCI Ronald Sainsbury	2 episodes
2016	A Midsummer Night's Dream	Tom Snout	TV film

=== Selected audio roles ===
Year	Title	Role	Notes
1973	Saturday Night Theatre	Rat	Episode: "Toad of Toad Hall"
1980	Don Quixote	Sancho Panza	2 episodes, BBC Radio 4
1988	The Wonderful Visit	Vicar	BBC Radio 4
1989	Fear on 4	Mr Timmins	Episode: "Soul Searching", BBC Radio 4
2001–2006	Father Gilbert Mysteries	Bill Drake	Focus on the Family Radio Theatre
2006	The Mousehole Cat	Narrator	Audiobook
2007	Doctor Who: Horror of Glam Rock	Arnold Korns	Big Finish Productions
2010	The Wind in the Willows	Narrator	BBC School Radio, original air date unknown, re-aired in 2010
2013	Neverwhere	Old Bailey	BBC Radio 4
2015	The Bed-Sitting Room	Mate	BBC Radio 4
2016	How the Marquis Got His Coat Back	Old Bailey	BBC Radio 4
2019	Doctor Who: The Tenth Doctor Adventures	Wilfred Mott	Big Finish Productions

== Theatre ==
Year	Title	Role	Notes
24 January – 5 February 1955	Harvey	Marvin Wilson	Queen's Theatre, Hornchurch
28 March – 12 May 1956	The Comedy of Errors	Dromio	Arts Theatre, London
6 – 11 August 1956	Reluctant Heroes	Gregory	Theatre Royal, Windsor
19 March – 8 June 1957	Harmony Close	Tony	Lyric Theatre and Theatre Royal, Brighton
July 1957	Antarctica	Boris	Players Theatre
23 January – 22 March 1958	Lady at the Wheel	Fernando Fernandez	Lyric Theatre and Westminster Theatre
7 April – 14 June 1958	The Big Tickle	"Deadly" Mortimer	Duke of York's Theatre, Theatre Royal, Brighton, and other locations
14 – 19 April 1958	A Ticklish Business		Pavilion Theatre, Bournemouth
November 1958	Hook, Line and Sinker	Kiki Reger	Piccadilly Theatre, London
5 September 1960 – 6 May 1961	And Another Thing		Theatre Royal, Newcastle upon Tyne, Fortune Theatre, London, and other locations
20 March – 23 June 1962	Little Mary Sunshine	Cpl. "Billy" Jester	Comedy Theatre, Golders Green Hippodrome, and other locations
15 April 1968 – January 1970	Not Now, Darling	Arnold Crouch	Strand Theatre, London, Alexandra Theatre, Birmingham, and other locations
22 July 1974 – 26 July 1975	There Goes the Bride	Timothy Westerby	Criterion Theatre, Ambassadors Theatre and other locations
24 October – 9 December 1978	Forty Love	Murray	Yvonne Arnaud Theatre, Theatre Royal, Bath, and other locations
5 – 24 February 1979	Forty Love	Murray	Comedy Theatre and Theatre Royal, Brighton
29 March 1983 – 14 December 1991	Run for Your Wife	Stanley Gardner	Shaftesbury Theatre, Criterion Theatre and other locations
April 1984	Guys and Dolls	Nathan Detroit	The National Theatre
4 July 1989 – 25 August 1990	Anything Goes	Moonface Martin	Prince Edward Theatre
July 1995	La Grande Magia	Professor Otto Marvuglia	National Theatre

== Discography ==
=== Albums ===
Year	Album	Notes
1962	A Combination of Cribbins	
1970	The Best of Bernard Cribbins	
1975	Hans Andersen – Original Soundtrack Album	
1975	Paddington Bear Volume 1	Narrator
1975	Paddington Bear Volume 2	Narrator
1983	The Snowman	Narrator
2005	The Very Best of Bernard Cribbins	

=== Chart singles ===
Year	Title	UK peak position	Notes
1962	"Hole in the Ground"	9	One of Noël Coward's choices when guest on BBC Radio's Desert Island Discs
1962	"Right Said Fred"	10	Inspired the name of the band of the same name
1962	"Gossip Calypso"	25	Written by Trevor Peacock
