= Jack Douglas (actor) =

English actor (1927–2008)

- In Carry On Girls (1973)
- Born: John Douglas Roberton; 26 April 1927; Newcastle upon Tyne, England
- Died: 18 December 2008 (aged 81); Isle of Wight, England
- Other name: Jack D. Douglas
- Occupation: Actor
- Years active: 1961–1992
- Children: 2

John Douglas Roberton (26 April 1927 – 18 December 2008), known professionally as Jack Douglas or Jack D. Douglas, was an English actor best known for his portrayals in the Carry On films.

== Early life ==
Douglas was born in Newcastle upon Tyne, into a theatrical family; his father was a theatre producer and his brother, Bill Roberton, became a theatre director. His mother was so keen that he be a Geordie that, according to Douglas, although they had settled in London, "she jumped on a train and came to Newcastle. I was born in my grandfather’s house near the Swing Bridge. She did the same with my brother."

Douglas spent his early years on a farm in Meriden. The family later moved to Blackpool to get away from the bombing in the Second World War.

== Career ==
Douglas wanted to work in theatre, but his father forbade him, so he left home at the age of 14. He was then hired as an "Opposite Prompt Lime Boy" for £1.5s a week at Feldman's Theatre.

Douglas's father found out where he was working and asked the theatre to give his son all of the dirty jobs to try and discourage him, but Jack did them all without complaint. On his fifteenth birthday, his father gave him a script for a Cinderella pantomime, which he was to direct. Having seen his father direct three or four pantomimes, Jack knew what to do, and did 22 weeks at the Empire Theatre, Sunderland.

Later, Douglas was to direct a show at the Kingston Empire, only to have a lead actor taken to hospital with a heart attack on the opening night before the show started. Joe Baker, who was also playing a lead role, suggested Douglas take over the role as he was the only other person who knew the lines. An agent in the audience that night was so impressed that he visited Douglas and Baker after the show; he was surprised to learn that they had only been a double act for two hours and thirty-five minutes, and immediately signed them up as such.

Douglas and Baker spent ten years touring the world, playing in Australia, New Zealand, and South Africa, amongst other places. Coming back to Britain, they did a season at a Butlins holiday camp and not liking the food served there, Douglas cooked in their chalet (which was forbidden) for both of them and a guest. One evening, Billy Butlin knocked on the door and asked if they had enough for four. They did, and he ate with them.

From there they went to the BBC to begin the popular children's TV show Crackerjack, with Eamonn Andrews as host. They found themselves working on it from 9:30 am to 2:30 pm each day; their agent fitted in another two jobs, so that the pair made £100 a week.

Following this, they moved on to the Windmill Theatre and later at the Glasgow Empire, where they found they could get laughs by putting on American accents. After that, Joe Baker went to America to try his luck there. On his own for the first time in so many years, Douglas told his agent, Leslie Grade, that he wanted to be a comedian. Grade discouraged him as he did not have a funny face, so Douglas left show business and opened up a restaurant in Blackpool. It was successful and he found he personally had nothing to do there, the staff doing everything.

One night, Douglas got a call from Des O'Connor, who had a contract with ATV for 13 shows. He wanted Douglas to star with him. He readily agreed, and O'Connor let him do what he liked. They did a Royal Variety Show together, O'Connor insisting to Bernard Delfont that Douglas went with him, as he later insisted that after the show, they meet the Queen Mother together, or O'Connor would not do so himself.

Douglas worked with O'Connor for several years and in the theatre, developing a nervous character "Alf Ippititimus", notable for his "phwaay!" catchphrase, his apparent muscular tics and getting his shirt torn completely off and ending up with a raw egg smeared over his chest. "Alf" was created one night at Butlins in Clacton, when Douglas's co-star, Joe Baker failed to appear having been locked out of the theatre, and Douglas began to improvise based on a bandleader he knew.

American audiences knew him from his television appearances on NBC's Kraft Music Hall variety series in 1969: thirteen episodes of Britain's The Des O'Connor Show were broadcast as Kraft's summer-replacement series. For these programs, Jack Douglas had to be billed as "Jack D. Douglas" because American writer and TV personality Jack Douglas was already using the name.

=== Carry On ===
Douglas's agent phoned him and said he had a part in a Carry On film, but he would not be paid (low-budget producer Peter Rogers, it was said, would give his actors anything but money). He accepted the small part; in return, a black Rolls-Royce pulled up outside his house one morning, bringing a box from Peter Rogers. It contained a dozen bottles of Dom Pérignon champagne, as his payment for the film.

Douglas appeared in the last seven Carry On films of the original series: Carry On Matron, Carry On Abroad, Carry On Girls, Carry On Dick, Carry On Behind, Carry On England and Carry On Emmannuelle. His Carry On roles progressed from a cameo with one line of dialogue in Matron to a cameo appearance in Abroad, after which he appeared in increasingly larger supporting roles, and ultimately a leading role in Emmanuelle. During this period, he also appeared in the Carry on Christmas specials in 1972, and 1973 and the Carry On Laughing television series. He appeared in the revival film Carry On Columbus (1992).

After the Carry On films, the cast with Douglas went to the Victoria Palace Theatre where they played to packed houses for the next 12 months in the stage show Carry On London.

In 1978, Douglas released a novelty record called "Don't Forget The Beer, Dear", written by Gordon Haskell and produced by Sally Smith.

Douglas also guest-starred in The Goodies episode "Goodies in the Nick" and appeared in The Shillingbury Blowers and its associated series Shillingbury Tales in the early 1980s.

== Later life and death ==
In December 2001, he appeared on the BBC radio show That Reminds Me (Series 3, episode 4, repeated 27 May 2014 on BBC Radio 4 Extra) where he talked about his life.

On 26 April 2007, Douglas celebrated his 80th birthday. There was a special celebration arranged at Pinewood Studios, to coincide with his anniversary, which was attended by his family and friends. They included actors whom Douglas had worked with, among them Fenella Fielding, Jacki Piper, Lance Percival, and Valerie Leon.

After a period of ill health, Douglas died from pneumonia on the Isle of Wight on 18 December 2008, at the age of 81.

== Filmography ==
- Nearly a Nasty Accident (1961) – Balmer
- Carry On Matron (1972) – Twitching Father
- Carry On Abroad (1972) – Harry
- Carry On Girls (1973) – William
- Carry On Dick (1974) – Sergeant Jock Strapp
- Carry On Behind (1975) – Ernie Bragg
- Carry On England (1976) – Bombardier Ready
- What's Up Nurse! (1977) – Constable
- Carry On Emmannuelle (1978) – Lyons
- The Shillingbury Blowers (1980) – Jake
- Bloody Kids (1980) – Senior Police Officer
- The Boys in Blue (1982) – Chief Superintendent
- Norbert Smith – a Life (1989) – Greenham guard
- Carry On Columbus (1992) – Marco the Cereal Killer (final film role)

== Other sources ==
- That Reminds Me, a December 2001 BBC radio show in which Douglas talked of his life in show business
