= List of Ivor Novello Award winners and nominees (1950s–1960s) =

The Ivor Novello Awards are held annually since 1956 by the Ivors Academy, formerly the British Academy of Songwriters, Composers and Authors, to recognize the excellence in songwriting and composing. The following list consists of all the winners and nominees of the awards by year, the winners are listed first and in bold followed by the nominees if present.

The awards and nominations are received by the songwriters of the nominated work, not the performers, unless they also have songwriting credits.

== 1950s ==
=== 1956 ===
The 1st Ivor Novello Awards were presented on March 11, 1956, at the Theatre Royal, Drury Lane, London.

Category	Recipient and nominees
Outstanding Services in the Field of Popular Music	**Jack Payne**
The Year's Most Effective Musical Play Score	**Salad Days – Written by Dorothy Reynolds and Julian Slade**; The Water Gipsies – Written by Vivian Ellis and A.P. Herbert
The Year's Most Popular Song	**"Ev'rywhere" – Written by Tolchard Evans and Jack Fishman**; "A Blossom Fell" – Written by Howard Barnes, Harold Cornelius and Dominic John; Performed by Nat King Cole
The Year's Outstanding Comedy Song	**"Got'n Idea" – Written by Paddy Roberts and Jack Woodman**; "The Income Tax Collector" – Written by Michael Flanders and Donald Swann
The Year's Outstanding Piece of Light Orchestral Music	**"The Dam Busters" – Written by Eric Coates**; "John and Julie" – Written by Philip Green
The Year's Outstanding Popular Song	**"In Love for the Very First Time" – Written by Paddy Roberts and Jack Woodman**; "Man in the Raincoat" – Written by Warwick Webster; Performed by Priscilla Wright
The Year's Outstanding "Swing" Composition	**"Big City Suite" – Written by Ralph Dollimore**; "Fanfare Boogie" – Written by Max Kaye and Brian Fahey

=== 1957 ===
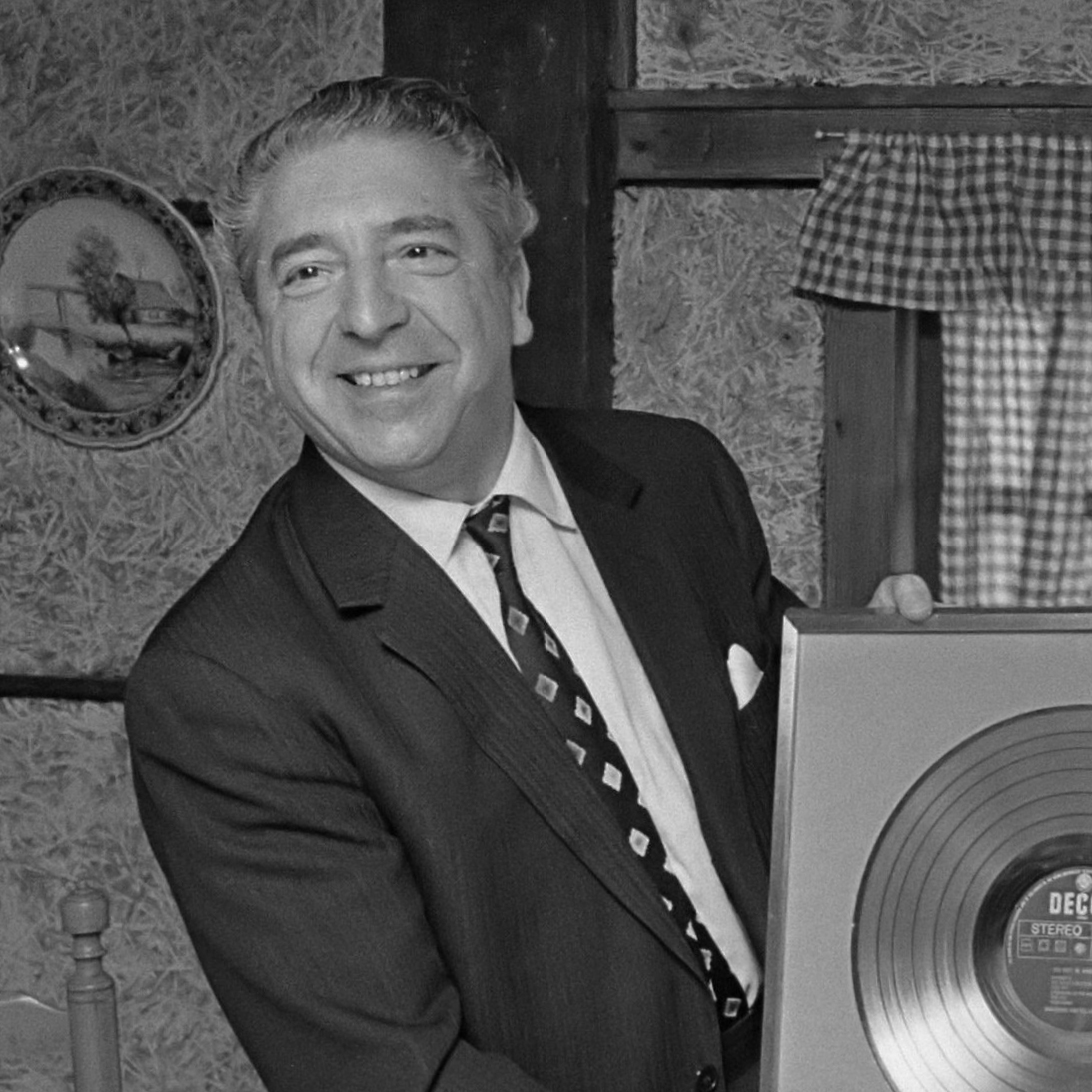
Outstanding Personal Services to Popular Music recipient, Anglo-Italian composer A. P. Mantovani

The 2nd Ivor Novello Awards were presented on April 8, 1957.

Category	Recipient and nominees
Outstanding Personal Services to Popular Music	**A. P. Mantovani**
Most Outstanding Song of the Year, Musically and Lyrically	**"By the Fountains of Rome" – Written by Norman Newell and Mátyás Seiber; Performed by Mátyás Seiber**; "My Unfinished Symphony" – Written by Milton Carson; Performed by David Whitfield
The Best Selling and Most Performed Song of the Year	**"My September Love" – Written by Tolchard Evans and Richard Mullan; Performed by David Whitfield**; "Out of Town" – Written by Leslie Bricusse and Robin Beaumont; Performed by Max Bygraves
The Year's Outstanding Composition in "Rhythm" Style	**"Intinerary of an Orchestra" – Written by Johnny Dankworth and Dave Lindup**; "Experiments with Mice" – Written by Johnny Dankworth
The Year's Outstanding Contribution to the Score of a Stage Play, Film, TV Programme or Radio Production	**The March Hare – Written by Philip Green**; You Are My First Love – Written by Paddy Roberts and Lester Powell
The Year's Outstanding Light Orchestral Composition	**"The Westminster Waltz" – Written by Robert Farnon**; "Toyshop Ballet" – Written by A.P. Mantovani
The Year's Outstanding Novelty Song	**"Nellie the Elephant" – Written by Ralph Butler and Peter Hart; Performed by Mandy Miller**; "Lift Boy" – Written by Ken Hare, Ron Goodwin and Dick James; Performed by Max Bygraves

=== 1958 ===
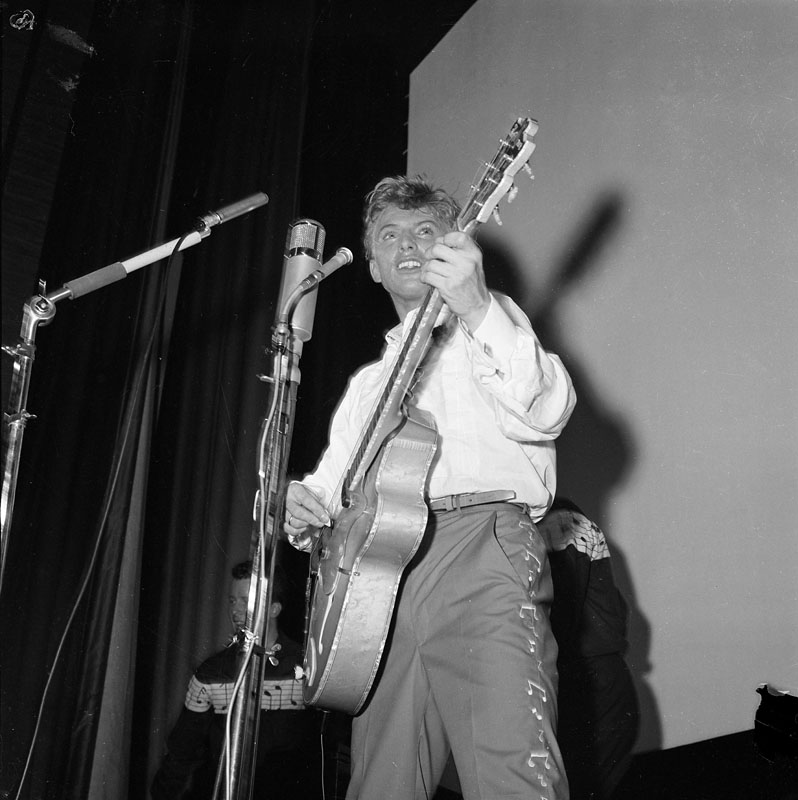
Most Outstanding Song of the Year, Musically and Lyrically co-winner Tommy Steele

The 3rd Ivor Novello Awards were presented in 1958.

Category	Recipient and nominees
Outstanding Services to British Popular Music	**Ted Heath**
Most Outstanding Song of the Year, Musically and Lyrically	**"A Handful of Songs" – Written by Lionel Bart, Michael Pratt and Tommy Steele; Performed by Tommy Steele**; "Your Love is My Love" – Written by Johnny Brandon; Performed by Alan Dale
The Best Selling and Most Performed Song of the Year	**"I'll Find You" – Written by Tolchard Evans and Richard Mullan; Performed by Ron Goodwin**; "We Will Make Love" – Written and performed by Russ Hamilton
The Year's Outstanding Composition in "Rhythm" Style	**"Overdrive" – Written by Tommy Watt**; "Skiffling Strings" – Written by Ron Goodwin
The Year's Outstanding Light Orchestral Composition	**"Elizabethan Serenade" – Written by Ronald Binge**; "The Streets of Sorrento" – Written by Tony Osborne
The Year's Outstanding Novelty Song	**"Three Brothers" – Written by Paddy Roberts**; Water, Water" – Written by Lionel Bart, Michael Pratt and Tommy Steele
The Year's Outstanding Score of a Stage Play, Film, TV Programme or Radio Production	**Free as Air – Written by Dorothy Reynolds and Julian Slade**; The Tommy Steele Story – Written by Lionel Bart, Michael Pratt and Tommy Steele

=== 1959 ===
The 4th Ivor Novello Awards were presented at the BBC Television Theatre, London on May 25, 1959.

Category	Recipient and nominees
Outstanding Services to British Popular Music	**Billy Cotton**
Most Outstanding Song of the Year, Musically and Lyrically	**"The Wind Cannot Read" – Written by Peter Hart; Performed by Vera Lynn**; "There Goes My Love" – Written by Leonard Taylor and Harold Shaper; Performed by The Fantastics
The Best Selling and Most Performed Song of the Year	**"Trudie" – Written and performed by Joe Henderson**; "You Need Hands" – Written and performed by Max Bygraves
The Year's Outstanding Composition in Jazz or Beat Idiom	**"Rock Bottom" – Written by Tommy Watt and Jock Bain**; "The Colonel's Tune" – Written by Tommy Watt and Jock Bain
The Year's Outstanding Contribution to the Score of a Stage Play, Film, TV Programme or Radio Production	**Josita – Written by Philip Green**; Theme Music for The Inn of the Sixth Happiness – Written by Malcolm Arnold
The Year's Outstanding Light Ochestral Composition	**"Lingering Lovers" – Written by Ron Goodwin**; "Melody from the Sea" – Written by Donald Phillips
The Year's Outstanding Novelty Song	**"I'm So Ashamed" – Written by Ken Hare; Performed by Peter Sellers**; "The Army Game" – Written by Pat Napper and Sid Colin; Performed by the cast of The Army Game

== 1960s ==
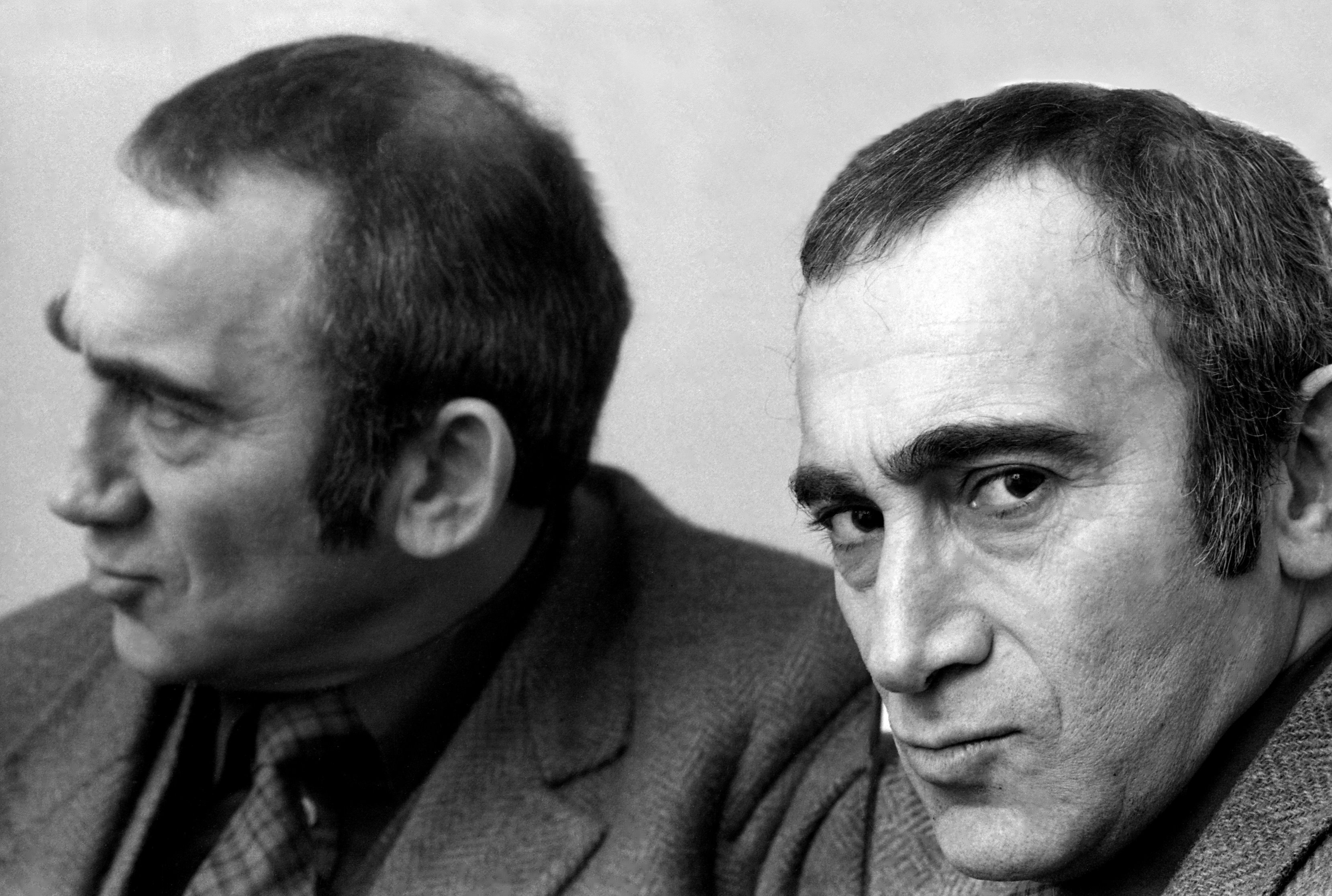
Outstanding Personal Services to British Popular Music recipient Lionel Bart

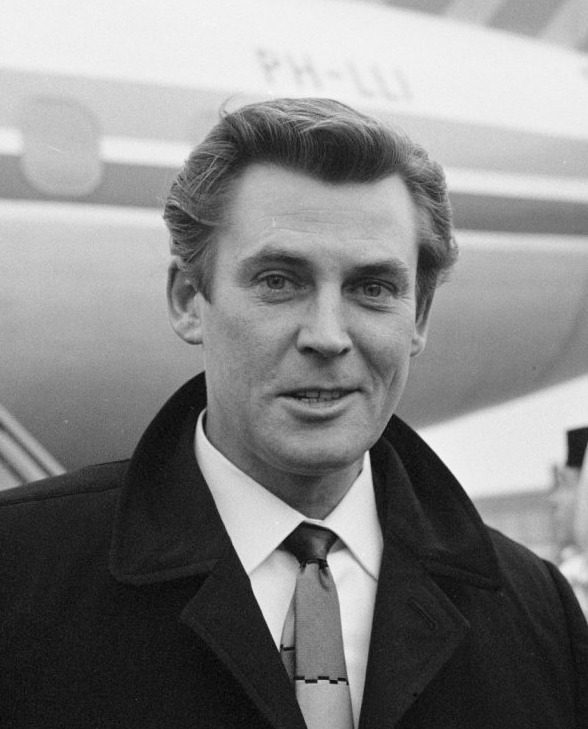
Russ Conway received the Best Selling and Most Performed Song of the Year award.

=== 1960 ===
The 5th Ivor Novello Awards were broadcast on BBC Television on June 6, 1960.

Category	Recipient and nominees
Outstanding Personal Services to British Popular Music	**Lionel Bart**
Most Outstanding Song of the Year, Musically and Lyrically	**"The Village of St. Bernadette" – Written by Eula Parker; Performed by Andy Williams**; "Maybe This Year" – Written by Ronald Wakley and Marcel Stellman; Performed by Edna Savage
The Best Selling and Most Performed Song of the Year	**"Side Saddle" – Written and performed by Russ Conway**; "Living Doll" – Written by Lionel Bart; Performed by Cliff Richard and The Drifters
The Year's Outstanding Composition in Jazz or Beat Idiom	**"Beaulieu Festival Suite" – Written by Kenny Graham**; "Jazz Boat" – Written by Joe Henderson
The Year's Outstanding Contribution to the Score of a Stage Play, Film, TV Programme or Radio Production	**Lock Up Your Daughters – Written by Lionel Bart and Laurie Johnson**; Meet the Family – Written by Peter Greenwell and Peter Wildeblood
The Year's Outstanding Light Ochestral Composition	**"Windows of Parish" – Written by Tony Osborne**; "Ring Ding" – Written by Steve Race
The Year's Outstanding Novelty Item	**"The Ballad of Bethnal Green" – Written ed and performby Paddy Roberts**; "Little White Bull" – Written by Michael Pratt, Lionel Bart and Tommy Steele; Performed by Tommy Steele

=== 1961 ===
The 6th Ivor Novello Awards were presented on May 20, 1961.

Category	Recipient and nominees
Outstanding Personal Services to British Popular Music	**Eric Maschwitz**
Judges' Choice	**"Goodness Gracious Me" – Written by Herbert Kretzmer and David Lee**; "The Belle of Barking Creek" – Written by Paddy Roberts
Most Outstanding Song of the Year, Musically and Lyrically	**"Portrait of My Love" – Written by Norman Newell and Cyril Ornadel; Performed by Matt Monro**; "As Long as He Needs Me" – Written by Lionel Bart; Performed by Shirley Bassey
The Best Selling and Most Performed Song of the Year	**"As Long as He Needs Me" – Written by Lionel Bart; Performed by Shirley Bassey**; "Apache" – Written by Jerry Lordan
The Year's Outstanding Composition in Jazz or Beat Idiom	**"Apache" – Written by Jerry Lordan**; "Hit and Miss" – Written by John Barry
The Year's Outstanding Contribution to the Score of a Stage Play, Film, TV Programme or Radio Production	**Oliver! – Written by Lionel Bart**; **The Gurney Slade (Theme) – Written by Max Harris**
The Year's Outstanding Light Ochestral Composition	**"Seashore" – Written by Robert Farnon**; "The Willow Waltz" – Written by Cyril Watters
Special Award	**"What Do You Want If You Don't Want Money?" – Written by Johnny Worth; Performed by Adam Faith**

=== 1962 ===
The 7th Ivor Novello Awards were broadcast on BBC Television on May 13, 1962.

Category	Recipient and nominees
Outstanding Services to British Music	**Cliff Richard, Jet Harris, Hank Marvin, Tony Meehan and Bruce Welch**
Most Outstanding Song of the Year, Musically and Lyrically	**"What Kind of Fool Am I?" – Written by Leslie Bricusse and Anthony Newley; Performed by Sammy Davis Jr.**; "No Greater Love" – Written by Michael Carr and Bunny Lewis; Performed by Craig Douglas
The "A" Side of the Record Issued in 1961 Which Achieved the Highest Certified British Sales	**"Walkin' Back to Happiness" – Written by Michael Hawker and John Schroeder; Performed by Helen Shapiro**; "Are You Sure?" – Written by Bob Allison and John Allison, Performed by The Allisons
The Most Performed Work of the Year	**"Portrait of My Love" – Written by Cyril Ornadel and Norman Newell; Performed by Matt Monro**; "My Kind of Girl" – Written by Leslie Bricusse; Performed by Matt Monro
The Year's Outstanding Composition in a Film, Radio Production or Television Programme	**Maigret (Theme) – Written by Ron Grainer**; The Avengers (Theme) – Written by John Dankworth
The Year's Outstanding Light Orchestral Composition	**"The Secrets of the Seine" – Written by Tony Osborne**; "Stranger on the Shore" – Written by Acker Bilk
The Year's Outstanding Original Jazz Composition	**"African Waltz" – Written by Galt MacDermot**; "Duddley Dell" – Written by Dudley Moore
The Year's Outstanding Score of a Musical Stage Play	**Stop the World – I Want to Get Off – Written by Leslie Bricusse and Anthony Newley**

=== 1963 ===
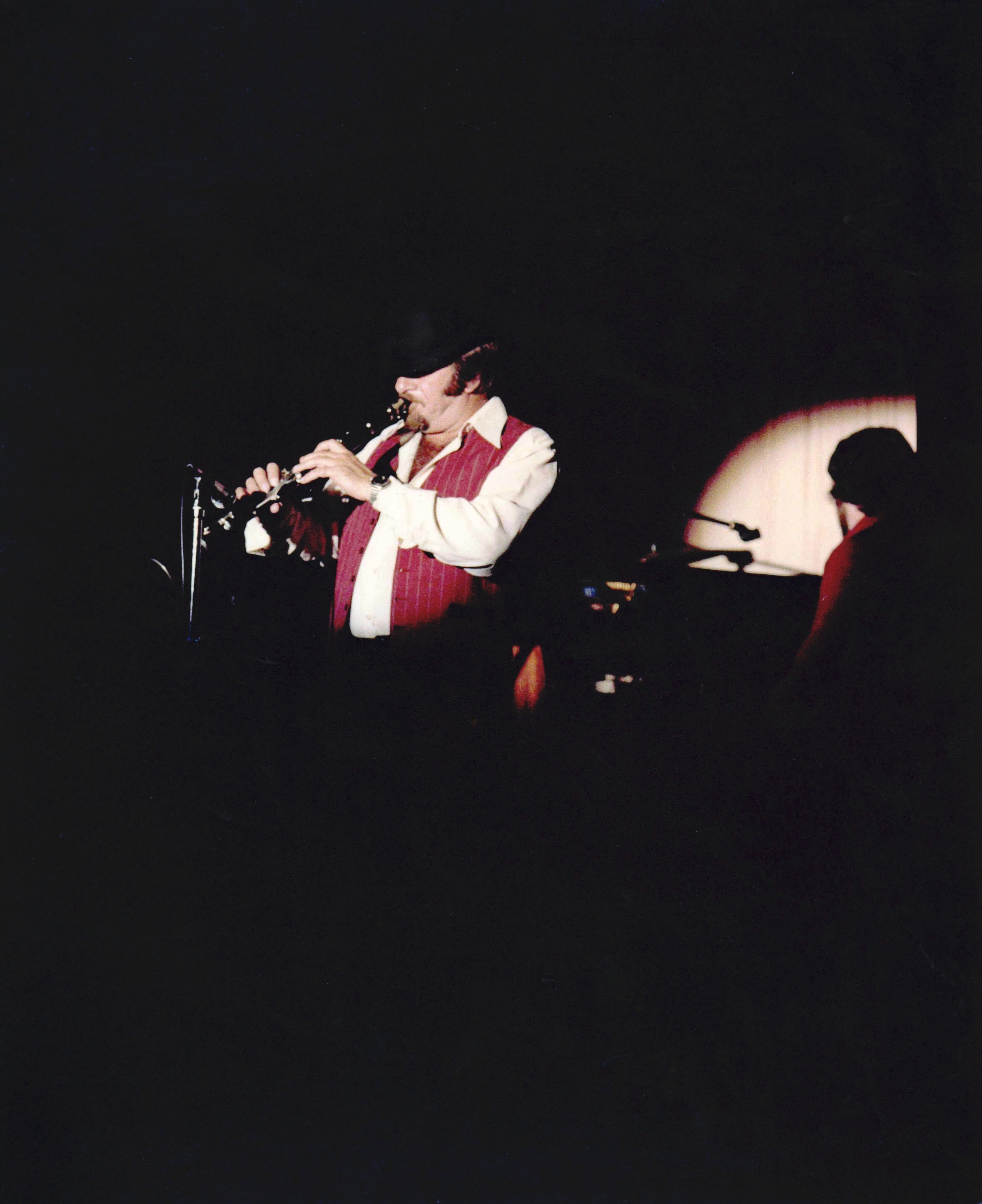
The Most Performed Work of the Year winner Acker Bilk

The 8th Ivor Novello Awards were broadcast on BBC Television on May 4, 1963.

Category	Recipient and nominees
Special Award for Outstanding Services to British Popular and Light Music	**Lawrence Wright**
Most Outstanding Song of the Year, Musically and Lyrically	**"My Love and Devotion" – Howard Barnes, Harold Fields and Joe Roncoroni; Performed by Matt Monro**; "Jeannie" – Written by Norman Newell and Russ Conway; Performed by Russ Conway
The "A" Side of the Record Issued in 1962 Which Achieved the Highest Certified British Sales	**"Telstar" – Joe Meek; Performed by The Tornados**; "Bachelor Boy" – Written by Cliff Richard and Bruce Welch; Performed by Cliff Richard and the Shadows
The Most Performed Work of the Year	**"Stranger on the Shore" – Written and performed by Acker Bilk**; "Wonderful Land" – Written by Jerry Lordan; Performed by The Shadows
The Year's Outstanding Composition in a Film, Radio Production or Television Programme	**Steptoe and Son – Written by Ron Grainer**; March from A Little Suite – Written by Trevor Duncan
The Year's Outstanding Light Orchestral or Other Non-Vocal Composition	**"Nicola" – Written by Steve Race**; "Turkish Coffee" – Written by Tony Osborne
The Year's Outstanding Original Jazz Composition	**"Revival" – Written by Joe Harriott**; "Outbreak of Murder" – Written by Gordon Franks
The Year's Outstanding Score of a Musical	**Summer Holiday – Written by Brian Bennett, Stanley Black, Ronald Cass, Mike Conlin, Hank Marvin, Peter Myers, Cliff Richard and Bruce Welch**; Blitz! – Written by Lionel Bart

=== 1964 ===
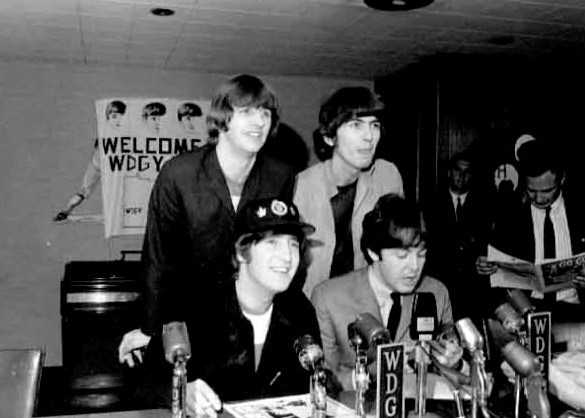
English band The Beatles received the Special Award for Outstanding Services to British Music alongside their manager Brian Epstein and their record producer George Martin.

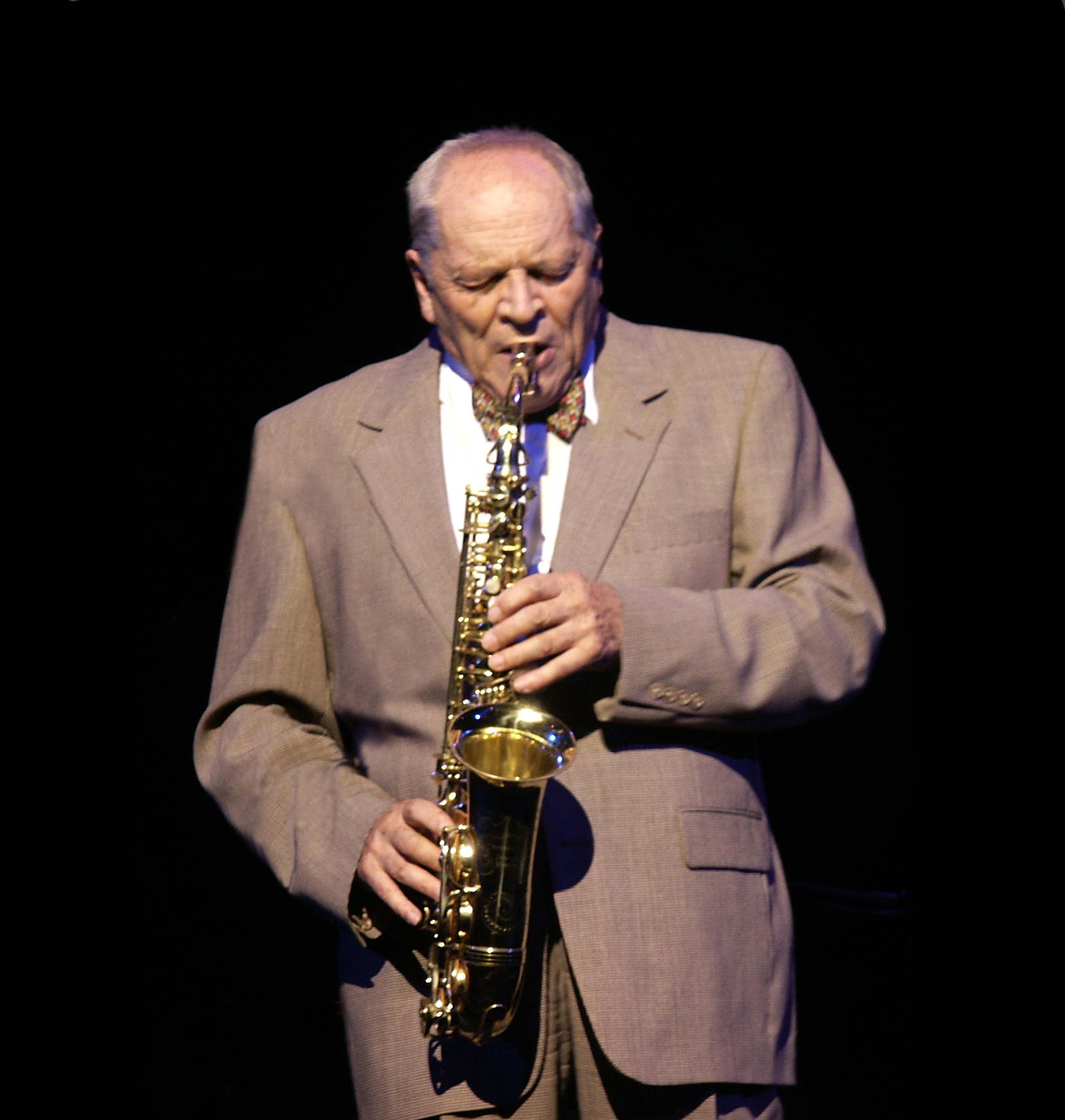
Composer John Dankworth received two awards, Outstanding Jazz Work and Outstanding Score of a Musical Show, for Stage, Cinema, Television or Radio.

The 9th Ivor Novello Awards were presented in 1964.

Category	Recipient and nominees
Special Award in Recognition of Fifty Years' Service to the Music Industry	**The Performing Right Society**
Special Award for Outstanding Services to British Music	**Brian Epstein, George Harison, John Lennon, George Martin, Paul McCartney and Ringo Starr**
The "A" Side of the Record Issued in 1963 Which Achieved the Highest Certified British Sales	**"She Loves You" – Written by John Lennon and Paul McCartney; Performed by The Beatles**; "I Want to Hold Your Hand" – Written by John Lennon and Paul McCartney; Performed by The Beatles
The Most Broadcast Work of the Year	**"She Loves You" – Written by John Lennon and Paul McCartney; Performed by The Beatles**; "Dance On!" – Written by Valerie Murtagh, Elaine Murtagh and Ray Adams; Performed by The Shadows
The Year's Most Amusing or Novel Composition	**"Flash, Bang, Wallop" – Written by David Heneker**; "Harvest of Love" – Written by Benny Hill and Tony Hatch
The Year's Outstanding Jazz Work	**What the Dickens! – Written by Johnny Dankworth**; "Sweet September" – Written by Bill McGuffie
The Year's Outstanding Orchestral / Instrumental Composition	**"Scarlett O'Hara" – Written by Jerry Lordan**; "Carlos' Theme" – Written by Ivor Slaney
The Year's Outstanding Score of a Musical Show, for Stage, Cinema, Television or Radio	**"Theme from The Avengers" – Written by Johnny Dankworth**; Half a Sixpence – Written by David Heneker
The Year's Outstanding Song	**"If I Ruled the World" – Written by Leslie Bricusse and Cyril Ornadel; Performed by Harry Secombe**; "All My Loving" – Written by John Lennon and Paul McCartney; Performed by The Beatles

=== 1965 ===
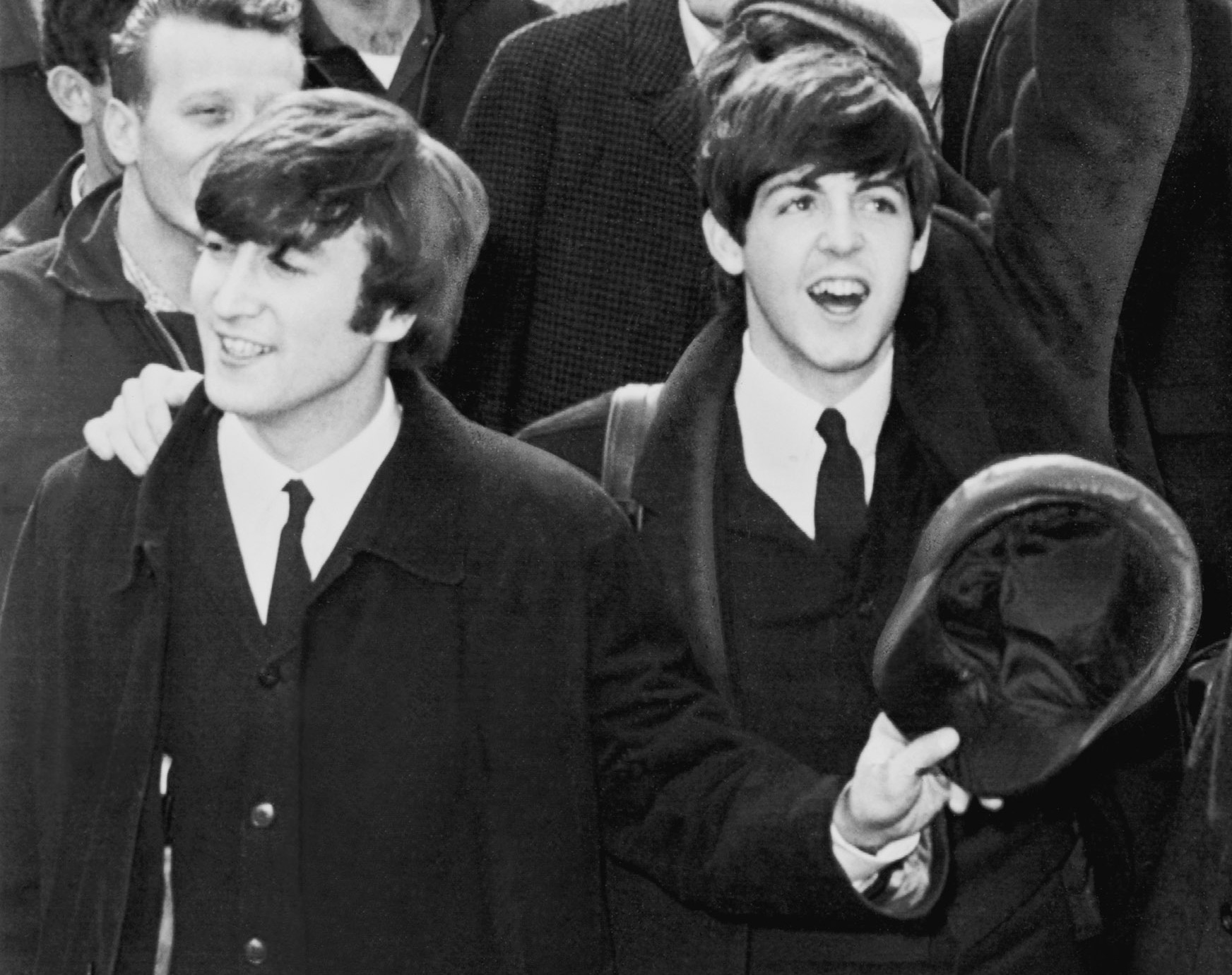
John Lennon (left) and Paul McCartney (right) won two awards for the song "Can't Buy Me Love".

The 10th Ivor Novello Awards took place on July 13, 1965, at the Savoy Hotel, London.

Category	Recipient and nominees
Special Award for Outstanding Services for British Music	**Paddy Roberts**
Outstanding Song	**"Downtown" – Written by Tony Hatch; Performed by Petula Clark**; "Losing You" – Written by Tom Springfield and Clive Westlake; Performed by Dusty Springfield
The "A" Side of the Record Issued in 1964 Which Achieved the Highest Certified British Sales	**"Can't Buy Me Love" – Written by John Lennon and Paul McCartney; Performed by The Beatles**; "I Feel Fine" – Written by John Lennon and Paul McCartney; Performed by The Beatles
The Most Performed Work of the Year	**"Can't Buy Me Love" – Written by John Lennon and Paul McCartney; Performed by The Beatles**; "A Hard Day's Night" – Written by John Lennon and Paul McCartney; Performed by The Beatles
The Year's Outstanding Orchestral / Instrumental Composition	**"Bombay Duckling" – Written by Max Harris**
The Year's Outstanding Score of a Stage Musical	**Robert and Elizabeth – Written by Ron Grainer and Ronald Millar**; Maggie May – Written by Lionel Bart
The Year's Outstanding Theme from Radio, TV or Film	**Not So Much a Programme, More a Way of Life – Written by Caryl Brahms, Ron Grainer and Ned Sherrin**; A Hard Day's Night – Written by John Lennon and Paul McCartney

=== 1966 ===
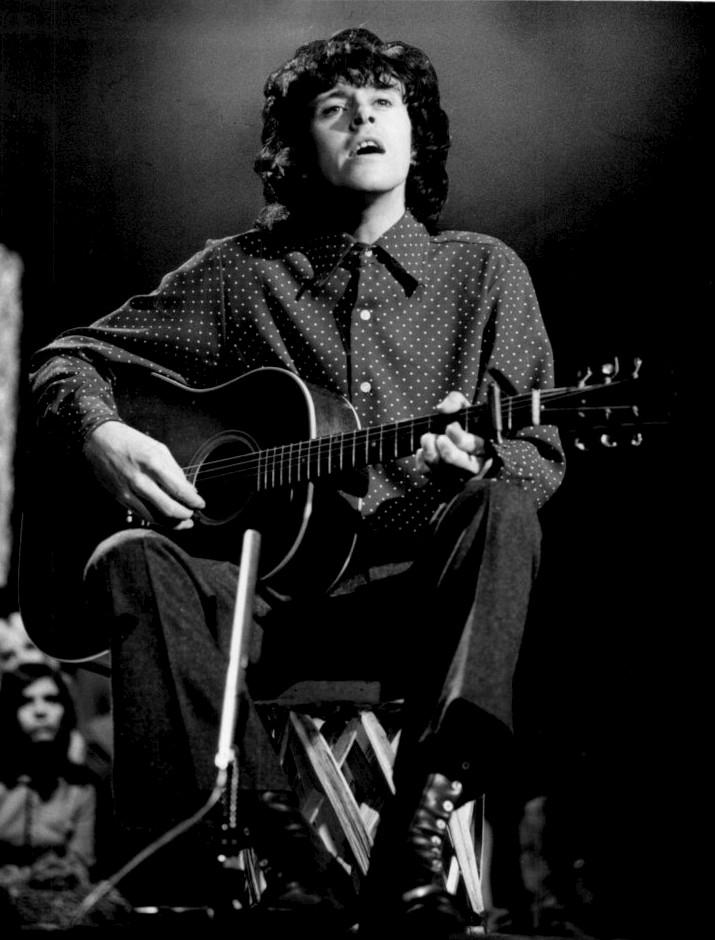
Scottish singer and songwriter Donovan won Outstanding Contemporary Folk Song.

The 11th Ivor Novello Awards were held the Hammersmith Palais, London.

Category	Recipient and nominees
Special Award for Outstanding Services to British Music	**BBC Television (for the production of the series A Song for Europe)**
Outstanding Song	**"Yesterday" – Written by John Lennon and Paul McCartney; Performed by The Beatles**; "Where Are You Now (My Love)" – Written by Tony Hatch and Jackie Trent; Performed by Jackie Trent
The "A" Side of the Record Issued in 1965 Which Achieved the Highest Certified British Sales	**"We Can Work It Out" – Written by John Lennon and Paul McCartney; Performed by The Beatles**; "Help!" – Written by John Lennon and Paul McCartney; Performed by The Beatles
The Most Performed Work of the Year	**"I'll Never Find Another You" – Written by Tom Springfield; Performed by The Seekers**; "March of the Mods" – Written by Tony Carr; Performed by Joe Loss
The Year's Outstanding Beat Song	**"It's Not Unusual" – Written by Gordon Mills and Les Reed; Performed by Tom Jones**; "Look Through Any Window" – Written by Graham Gouldman and Charles Silverman; Performed by The Hollies
The Year's Outstanding Contemporary Folk Song	**"Catch the Wind" – Written and performed by Donovan**
The Year's Outstanding Instrumental Composition	**"March of the Mods" – Written by Tony Carr**; "The Kiss" – Written by Jack Parnell
The Year's Outstanding Novelty Composition	**"A Windmill in Old Amsterdam" – Written by Ted Dicks and Myles Rudge**; "Mrs. Brown, You've Got a Lovely Daughter" – Written by Trevor Peacock
The Year's Outstanding Score of a Stage Musical	**Charlie Girl – Written by David Heneker and John Taylor**

=== 1967 ===
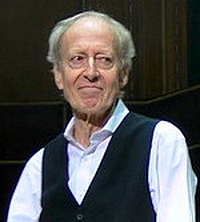

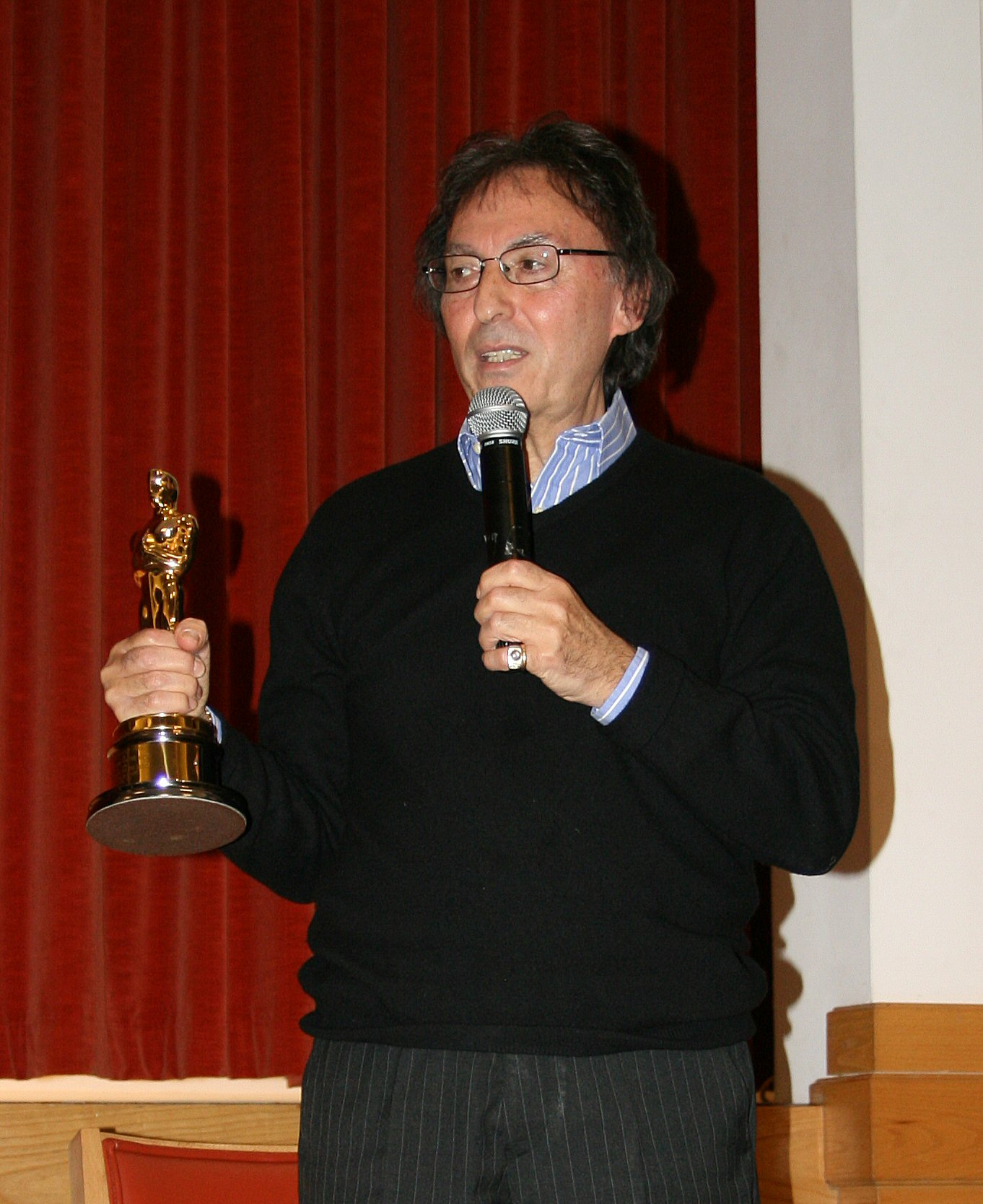
John Barry (top) and Don Black (bottom) won Film Song of the Year for "Born Free" from the film of the same name, they also received the Academy Award for Best Original Song for the song.

The 12th Ivor Novello Awards were held at the Lyceum Ballroom, London. They were broadcast on BBC radio service Light Programme on March 27, 1967.

Category	Recipient and nominees
Special Award for Outstanding Services to British Music	**Joe Loss**
Britain's International Song of the Year	**"Winchester Cathedral" – Written by Geoff Stephens; Performed by The New Vaudeville Band**; "Call Me" – Written by Tony Hatch; Performed by Petula Clark
Film Song of the Year	**"Born Free" – Written by John Barry and Don Black; Performed by Matt Monro**; "Time Drags By" – Written by Hank Marvin, Bruce Welch, Brian Bennett and John Rostill, Performed by Cliff Richard and the Shadows
Instrumental Composition of the Year	**"The Power Game" – Written by Wayne Hill**; "Khartoum" – Written by Frank Cordell
Novelty Song of the Year	**"Hev Yew Gotta Loight, Boy?" – Written by Allan Smethurst**; "Dedicated Follower of Fashion" – Written by Ray Davies
The "A" Side of the Record Issued in 1966 Which Achieved the Highest Certified British Sales	**"Yellow Submarine" – Written by John Lennon and Paul McCartney; Performed by The Beatles**; "What Would I Be" – Written by Jackie Trent; Performed by Val Doonican
The Most Performed Work of the Year	**"Michelle" – Written by John Lennon and Paul McCartney; Performed by The Beatles**; "Yesterday" – Written by John Lennon and Paul McCartney; Performed by The Beatles

=== 1968 ===
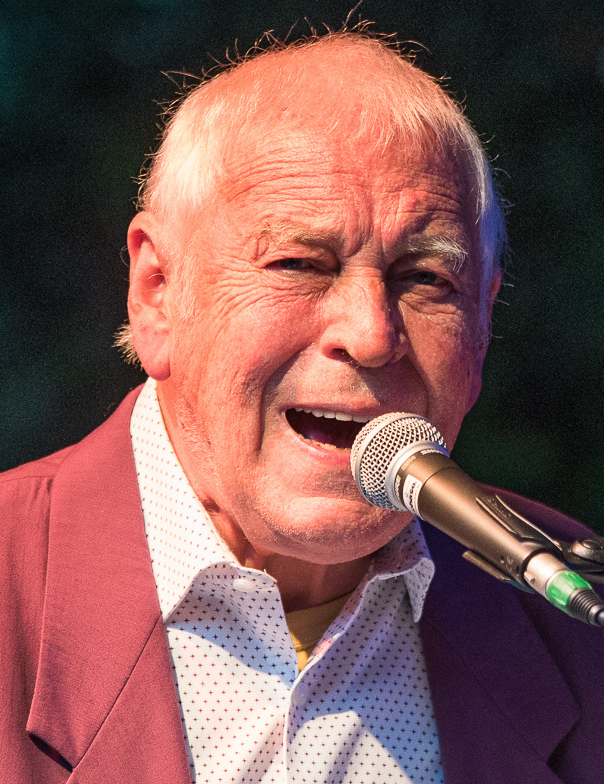
Gary Brooker won Britain's International Song of the Year alongside Keith Reid for Procol Harum's 1967 single "A Whiter Shade of Pale".

The 13th Ivor Novello Awards were presented in 1968.

Category	Recipient and nominees
Outstanding Services to British Music	**Alan Herbert**
Special Award	**Leslie Bricusse for the film score of Doctor Dolittle**
Best British Song, Musically and Lyrically	**"She's Leaving Home" – Written by John Lennon and Paul McCartney; Performed by The Beatles**; "Don't Sleep in the Subway" – Written by Tony Hatch and Jackie Trent; Performed by Petula Clark
Best Instrumental Theme	**"Love in the Open Air" – Written by Paul McCartney**
Britain's International Song of the Year	**"A Whiter Shade of Pale" – Written by Gary Brooker and Keith Reid; Performed by Procol Harum**; "To Sir with Love" – Written by Don Black and Mark London; Performed by Lulu
Novelty Song of the Year	**"Grocer Jack" – Written by Keith West and Mark Wirtz**; "Ballad of Bonnie & Clyde" – Written by Peter Callander and Mitch Murray
The "A" Side of the Record Issued in 1967 Which Achieved the Highest Certified British Sales	**"The Last Waltz" – Written by Barry Mason and Les Reed; Performed by Engelbert Humperdinck**; "Hello, Goodbye" – Written by John Lennon and Paul McCartney; Performed by The Beatles
The Most Performed Work of the Year	**"Puppet on a String" – Written by Phil Coulter and Bill Martin; Performed by Sandie Shaw**; "This Is My Song" – Written by Charlie Chaplin; Performed by Petula Clark

=== 1969 ===
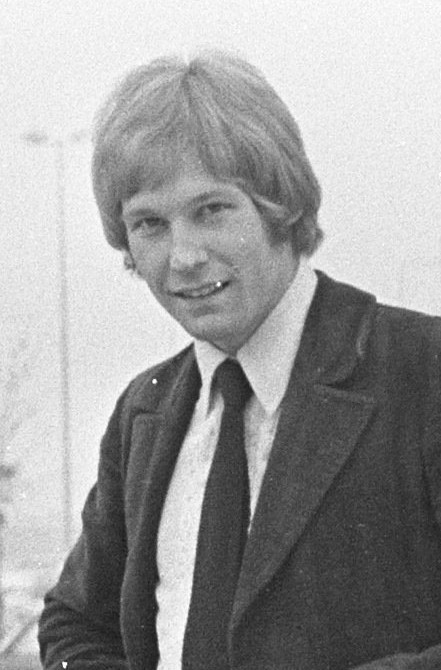
Michael D'Abo won Outstanding Dance/Beat Song of the Year alongside Tony Macaulay.

The 14th Ivor Novello Awards were presented on May 22, 1969.

Category	Recipient and nominees
Outstanding Services to British Music	**Andrew Gold**
Britain's International Song of the Year	**"Delilah" – Written by Barry Mason and Les Reed; Performed by Tom Jones**
Light Music Composition of the Year	**"Ring of Kerry" – Written by Peter Hope**
Novelty Song of the Year	**"I'm the Urban Spaceman" – Written by Neil Innes**; "Rosie" – Written by Donald Partridge
Outstanding Dance/Beat Song of the Year	**"Build Me Up Buttercup" – Written by Michael D'Abo and Tony Macaulay; Performed by The Foundations**
The "A" Side of the Record Issued in 1968 Which Achieved the Highest Certified British Sales	**"Hey Jude" – Written by John Lennon and Paul McCartney; Performed by The Beatles**
The Most Performed Work of the Year	**"Congratulations" – Written by Phil Coulter and Bill Martin; Performed by Cliff Richard**
The Most Romantic Song of the Year	**"I Close My Eyes and Count to Ten" – Written by Clive Westlake; Performed by Dusty Springfield**; "Jesamine" – Written by Ronnie Scott and Marty Wilde; Performed by The Casuals
