= Tommy Steele discography =

- Studio albums: 9
- EPs: 9
- Soundtrack albums: 5
- Compilation albums: 16
- Singles: 33
- Cast recording albums: 8

This is the discography of English rock and roll singer Tommy Steele, both with the Steelmen and as a solo artist.

== Albums ==
=== Studio albums ===
Year	Title	Details	Peak chart positions
Year	Title	Details	UK
1960	Get Happy with Tommy	Released: June 1960; Label: Decca; Live recording session at Decca Studios	—
1964	So This Is Broadway	Released: 1964; Label: Columbia; Covers of well-known musical numbers; Released in the US and Canada in 1965 as Everything's Coming Up Broadway!	—
1974	40 Favourites	Released: 1974; Label: Pye; NB: 8 singalong medleys.	—
1974	My Life, My Song	Released: 1974; Label: Pye; NB: Musical autobiography	—
1978	Live at the Festival	Released: 1978; Label: OAKS; NB: Recorded live at the Paignton Festival Theatre, August 1977	—
1979	Tommy Steele's Family Album	Released: 1979; Label: Ronco	—
2020	Tommy Steele presents: Breakheart	Released: 2020; Label: TSL Independent; Online released audio recording.	—
2020	Tommy Steele presents: The Christmas Mystery of Muchhope	Released: 2020; Label: TSL Independent; Online released audio recording.	—
2023	Tommy Steele presents: The Magic of Christmas	Released: 2023; Label: TSL Independent; Online released audio recording.	—
"—" denotes releases that did not chart

=== Live albums ===
Year	Title	Details	Peak chart positions
Year	Title	Details	UK
1957	Tommy Steele Stage Show	Released: March 1957; Label: Decca	5
"—" denotes releases that did not chart

=== Soundtrack albums ===
Year	Title	Details	Peak chart positions
Year	Title	Details	UK
1957	The Tommy Steele Story	Released: May 1957; Label: Decca; Soundtrack to the film of the same name; Released in the US and Canada as Rock Around the World	1
1958	The Duke Wore Jeans	Released: February 1958; Label: Decca; Soundtrack to the film of the same name	1
1967	Half a Sixpence	Released: 1967; Label: Decca; Soundtrack to the film of the same name	—
1967	Walt Disney's The Happiest Millionaire	Released: 1967; Label: Buena Vista; Soundtrack to the film The Happiest Millionaire; Album by various artists	—
1968	Finian's Rainbow	Released: September 1968; Label: Warner Bros.; Soundtrack to the film of the same name; Album by various artists	—
"—" denotes releases that did not chart

=== Cast recording albums ===
Year	Title	Details	Peak chart positions
Year	Title	Details	UK
1958	Cinderella	Released: 1958; Label: Decca; Original cast recording from the musical of the same name	—
1963	Half a Sixpence	Released: 1963; Label: Decca; Original West End cast recording from the musical of the same name	20
1965	Half a Sixpence	Released: 1965; Label: RCA Victor; Original Broadway cast recording from the musical of the same name	—
1974	Hans Andersen	Released: 1974; Label: Pye; Original cast recording from the musical of the same name	—
1977	Hans Andersen	Released: 1977; Label: Pye; Revival cast recording from musical of the same name; Album features a number of recordings from the 1974 version	—
1984	Singin' in the Rain	Released: 1984; Label: Safari; Original cast recording from the musical of the same name	—
1992	Some Like It Hot	Released: 1992; Label: First Night; Original cast recording from the musical of the same name	—
2007	Scrooge	Released: 2007; Label: BK; Cast recording from the musical of the same name	—
"—" denotes releases that did not chart or were not released

=== Compilation albums ===
Year	Title	Details	Peak chart positions
Year	Title	Details	UK
1969	The Happy World of Tommy Steele	Released: August 1969; Label: Decca	—
1971	The World of Tommy Steele Vol. 2	Released: 1971; Label: Decca	—
1977	Focus on Tommy Steele	Released: February 1977; Label: Decca	—
1979	Tommy Steele's Family Album	Released: October 1979; Label: Ronco	—
1983	20 Greatest Hits	Released: August 1983; Label: Spot	—
1987	The Rock 'n' Roll Years	Released: 9 November 1987; Label: See for Miles; Credited to Tommy Steele and the Steelmen	—
1992	The EP Collection	Released: 25 May 1992; Label: See for Miles	—
1999	The Decca Years 1956–1963	Released: May 1999; Label: Decca	—
2000	The Best of Tommy Steele	Released: February 2000; Label: Spectrum Music	—
2005	Rock with the Caveman	Released: June 2005; Label: Spectrum Music	—
2009	The Very Best of Tommy Steele	Released: September 2009; Label: Universal Music	22
2010	The Collection	Released: 4 January 2010; Label: Eagle	—
2015	The Very Best Of Tommy Steele	Released: 2015; Label: One Day Music; 3xCD box set	—
2017	Three Classic Albums Plus Singles and EP Tracks	Released: March 2017; Label: Real Gone Music; 4xCD box set	—
2017	The Absolutely Essential 3 CD Collection	Released: June 2017; Label: Big3	—
2021	Tommy Steele: Hits and Rarities	Released: April 2021; Label: Acrobat; 3xCD box set (live and rare material)	—
2021	"—" denotes releases that did not chart or were not released		

== EPs ==
Year	Title (Note: This is a list of EPs released in the UK. Various other EPs were released elsewhere. Note also that the UK EP chart did not start until 1960.)	Details	Peak chart positions
Year	Title	Details	UK
With the Steelmen
1957	Singing the Blues	Released: February 1957; Label: Decca	—
1957	Young Love	Released: August 1957; Label: Decca	—
1957	The Tommy Steele Story No. 1	Released: September 1957; Label: Decca	—
1957	The Tommy Steele Story No. 2	Released: October 1957; Label: Decca	—
1958	Tommy Steele In "The Duke Wore Jeans"	Released: May 1958; Label: Decca; Music from the film The Duke Wore Jeans	—
Solo
1958	Tommy Steele	Released: November 1958; Label: Decca	—
1959	Tommy	Released: October 1959; Label: Decca	—
1959	Tommy the Toreador	Released: November 1959; Label: Decca; Music from the film of the same name	4
1960	What a Mouth!	Released: 1960; Label: Decca	—
"—" denotes releases that did not chart

== Singles ==
Year	Single	Peak chart positions		Album
Year	Single	UK	AUS	Album
With the Steelmen
1956	"Rock with the Caveman" b/w "Rock Around the Town"	13	—	Tommy Steele Stage Show
1956	"Doomsday Rock b/w "Elevator Rock"	—	—	The Tommy Steele Story
1956	"Singing the Blues" b/w "Rebel Rock"	1	—	Non-album singles
1957	"Knee Deep in the Blues" b/w "Teenage Party"	15	—	Non-album singles
1957	"Butterfingers" b/w "Cannibal Pot"	8	—	The Tommy Steele Story
1957	"Shiralee" b/w "Grandad's Rock"	11	—	Non-album single (Note: From the film The Shiralee.)
1957	"Water, Water" b/w "A Handful of Songs"	5	—	The Tommy Steele Story
1957	"Hey You!" b/w "Plant a Kiss"	28	—	Non-album single
1958	"Happy Guitar" b/w "Princess"	20	—	The Duke Wore Jeans
1958	"Nairobi" b/w "Neon Sign"	3	—	Non-album singles
1958	"The Only Man on the Island" (Note: Released after Steele's first solo single "It's All Happening".) b/w "I Puts the Lightie On"	16	— 92	Non-album singles
Solo
1958	"It's All Happening" b/w "What Do You Do"	—	—	The Duke Wore Jeans
1958	"Come On, Let's Go" b/w "Put a Ring on Her Finger"	10	53	Non-album single
1958	"A Lovely Night" b/w "Marriage Type Love"	—	—	Cinderella
1959	"Hiawatha" b/w "The Trial"	—	—	Non-album singles
1959	"Tallahassee Lassie" b/w "Give! Give! Give!"	16; 28	—	Non-album singles
1959	"You Were Mine" b/w "Young Ideas"	—	—	Non-album singles
1959	"Little White Bull" b/w "Singing Time"	6	20	Tommy the Toreador (EP)
1960	"What a Mouth (What a North and South)" b/w "Kookaburra"	5	3	Get Happy with Tommy Steele
1960	"Happy-Go-Lucky Blues" b/w "(The Girl with The) Long Black Hair"	— (Note: "Happy-Go-Lucky Blues" did not chart on the Record Retailer chart, but did reach number 27 on the NME chart)	94	Non-album singles
1960	"Must Be Santa" b/w "Boys and Girls"	40	—	Non-album singles
1961	"My Big Best Shoes" b/w "The Dit Dit Song"	—	—	Non-album singles
1961	"The Writing on the Wall" b/w "Drunken Guitar"	30	—	Non-album singles
1962	"Hit Record" b/w "What a Little Darlin'"	—	—	Non-album singles
1962	"Butter Wouldn't Melt in Your Mouth" b/w "Where Have All the Flowers Gone"	—	—	Non-album singles
1962	"He's Got Love" b/w "Green Eye"	—	—	Non-album singles
1963	"Flash, Bang, Wallop!" b/w "She's Too Far Above Me"	—	—	Half a Sixpence (OCR)
1963	"The Dream Maker" b/w "Egg and Chips"	—	—	Non-album single (Note: From the film It's All Happening.)
1967	"Fortuosity" b/w "I'm a Brass Band"	—	—	Walt Disney's The Happiest Millionaire
1968	"Half a Sixpence" b/w "If the Rain's Got to Fall"	—	—	Half a Sixpence (OST)
1974	"The King's New Clothes" b/w "Wonderful Copenhagen"	—	—	Hans Andersen
1984	"Singin' in the Rain" b/w "You Are My Lucky Star"	—	—	Singin' in the Rain
1991	"Some Like It Hot" b/w "It's Always Love"	—	—	Some Like It Hot
"—" denotes releases that did not chart or were not released.
