= Tommy Steele Stage Show =

Live album by Tommy Steele and the Steelmen
- Released: 29 March 1957
- Recorded: 16 December 1956
- Venue: Conway Hall, London
- Genre: Rock and roll
- Length: 24:17
- Label: Decca

Tommy Steele and the Steelmen chronology
Tommy Steele Stage Show (1957)	The Tommy Steele Story (1957)

Tommy Steele Stage Show is a live album by English entertainer Tommy Steele, released as a 10-inch LP by Decca in March 1957. A concert recording of Steele backed by the Steelmen at London's Conway Hall, it was his first album release and features a version of the hit single "Rock with the Caveman" alongside several covers of American songs including three previously recorded by Hank Williams. The album's release followed Steele's swift rise to fame as a teen idol widely considered Britain's first rock and roll star, and the success of his UK Singles Chart number one "Singing the Blues". It received a muted critical reception but was commercially successful, peaking at number five on the UK Albums Chart.

== Background ==
Born in Bermondsey in 1936, Thomas Hicks joined the merchant navy at 15 and fell in love with American music, particularly country music, during his service. He learned to play guitar and began performing on ships, inspired most by Hank Williams. On shore leave in summer 1956, Hicks formed a loose band, the Cavemen, with Soho bohemians Lionel Bart and Mike Pratt. He began performing in Soho bars, including "Blue Suede Shoes" and "Heartbreak Hotel" alongside country songs in his set. An appearance at the 2i's Coffee Bar was seen by John Kennedy, a photographer and publicity man. Kennedy was intrigued by the singer, later commenting "Tommy was not handsome but he had a smile that drew you to him." Kennedy brought in impresario Larry Parnes, who considered the act "electrifying". Within two weeks of his first meeting with Kennedy, Hicks was signed to Decca and rechristened Tommy Steele.

In September 1956, Kennedy and Parnes arranged an elaborate publicity stunt which had Steele perform at a staged debutante ball populated by models and actresses posing as aristocracy. The event gained the singer his first national press, billed as "Britain's top rock 'n' roll singing guitarist", in The People under the headline "Rock 'n' roll has got the debs too!". On his first single, "Rock with the Caveman", Steele was backed by the Steelmen, comprising several notable British jazz musicians. The song, a humorous rock and roll composition written by Steele with Bart and Pratt, was a number 13 hit on the UK Singles Chart in November 1956. By November, Steele was headlining variety bills. His recording of "Singing the Blues" topped the chart in January 1957, the same month it was announced he was to star in a film dramatising his rise to fame.

Steele was quickly accepted as Britain's first indigenous rock and roll star. (Note: A British precursor to Steele was Tony Crombie & His Rockets, a band of jazz players who modelled themselves after Bill Haley & His Comets and formed in August 1956. Their Columbia single "Teach You to Rock" made the UK Top 30 in October 1956.) According to journalist Bruce Eder, Steele's singles with the Steelmen presented "uniquely English variants on a rock and roll sound". (Note: Steele wrote in March 1957 that he did not consider himself "part of the skiffle movement". In 2018, he told Bob Stanley that he did not like skiffle at this time, recalling, "It was like an old-fashioned country music to me, and I wanted to do this wonderful new beat music.") Though frequently referred to as Britain's answer to Elvis Presley, Steele's energetic demeanour made his act less sexual than Presley's. According to Simon Napier-Bell, teenage fans "didn't love Tommy Steele because he was sexy, they loved him because he'd managed to do something never before done in the British music business. Be young!" A teen idol, Steele was among the first British pop stars to be heavily merchandised, with tie-in sweaters, shoes and toy guitars.

== Contents ==
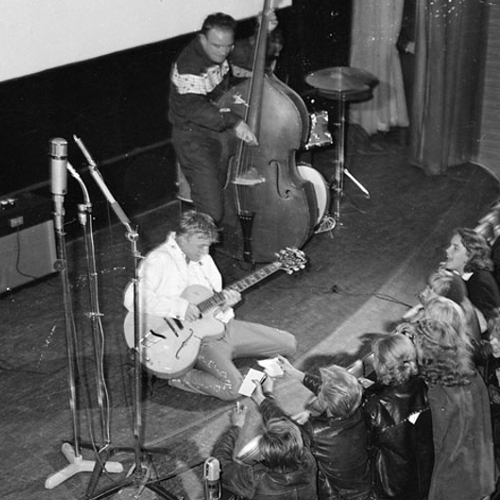
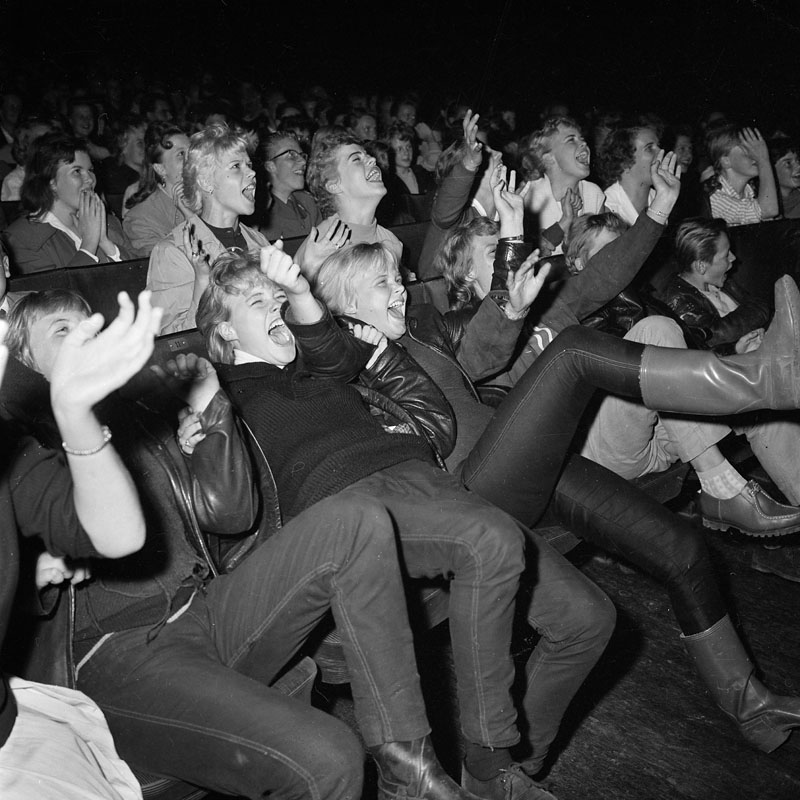
Scenes of fervour at a Tommy Steele concert in Stockholm

Tommy Steele Stage Show was recorded at a specially-arranged concert at the Conway Hall, London, on 16 December 1956, the night before Steele's twentieth birthday. The recording was edited for release, with several songs omitted. According to a contemporary write-up by Wendy Newlands of Westminster and Pimlico News, the resultant album's live status "means a great deal more than merely being a recording direct from the stage. It means we are treated to a sample of shouting and screaming from an audience of enthusiastic teenage fans." Steele's concerts were often marked by audience frenzy, with reports of screaming drowning out his performances. A review of an appearance at the Embassy Theatre, Peterborough on 11 February 1957 noted "each time he made a movement the girls screamed; a flick of the wrist sent them hysterical as they clapped and stamped on and off the beat."

Three of the album's selections, "Honky-Tonk Blues", "Kaw-Liga" and "Wedding Bells", were written or popularised by Hank Williams. Williams' songs were among the first Steele learnt to play. He considered "a good third" of his live set at this time to be country music, commenting "believing the drums accentuated the second and fourth beat of the bar, the fans assumed it was rock and roll." In a 1957 article, Steele singled out "What Is This Thing Called Love", a jazz standard written by Cole Porter, as one of his favourite songs to sing. The song had previously been recorded by Frank Sinatra, whose work Steele admired. "Razzle-Dazzle", written by Jesse Stone, had been a 1956 hit for Bill Haley & His Comets, while "Giddy Up a Ding-Dong" was originally recorded by Freddie Bell and the Bellboys, who toured the UK with Steele in May 1957. A studio version of "Teenage Party", written by Steele, was issued as the B-side of his single "Knee Deep in the Blues" in February 1957.

== Release and reception ==
Tommy Steele Stage Show was released by Decca on 29 March 1957. It was available only as a 10-inch LP rather than a standard 12-inch. It reached number five on the Record Mirror albums chart (later the UK Albums Chart) on 21 April 1957 and was the week's highest charting non-soundtrack or compilation album. The album was reissued, in its original 10-inch form, in July 1981 as part of a mid-price Decca campaign that also included The Tommy Steele Story (1957) and Billy Fury's The Sound of Fury (1960). It received a CD release in 2017 as part of Real Gone Music's 4CD Three Classic Albums set compiling Steele's 1950s recordings.

Despite the album being commercially successful, it received a poor reception. Bob Dawbarn of Melody Maker, then largely a jazz-oriented publication, commented "from a musical point of view everything is wrong - pitching, tempo, timing of entries and diction". Dawbarn wrote that he considered himself "sufficiently cynical to believe this one will sell a million while failing to find anything in the whole LP to justify such a sale". Writing under his pseudonym Disker in the Liverpool Echo, Tony Barrow described Steele as "full of life" and noted that the entertainer "never seems embarrassed by the most hard-boiled audiences", but opined "apart from his exuberance he has nothing. It is apparent that he is quite unable to sing and play the guitar at the same time. In the case of many of his numbers I would even go further and say he cannot sing with or without a guitar." He concluded that "the fact remains that he is still a scream-agers' delight and Decca will probably get away with this album." In The Virgin Encyclopedia of Popular Music (1997), Colin Larkin rated the album three stars out of five.

== Track listing ==
Side one
No.	Title	Writer(s)	Length
1.	"Giddy Up a Ding-Dong"	Freddie Bell, Pep Lattanzi	1:59
2.	"Treasure of Love"	Joe Shapiro, Lou Stallman	1:43
3.	"Honky-Tonk Blues"	Hank Williams	3:00
4.	"Razzle-Dazzle"	Jesse Stone	2:36
5.	"Kaw-Liga"	Williams, Fred Rose	2:12

Side two
No.	Title	Writer(s)	Length
1.	"Teenage Party"	Tommy Steele	2:20
2.	"Wedding Bells"	Claude Boone	4:46
3.	"What Is This Thing Called Love"	Cole Porter	1:35
4.	"On the Move"	Mike and Bernie Winters	2:13
5.	"Rock with the Caveman"	Frank Chacksfield, (Note: Frank Chacksfield is not credited on the single release of "Rock with the Caveman".) Lionel Bart, Mike Pratt, Steele	1:53
