= Frankie Davidson =

Australian entertainer (1934–2022)

Frankie Davidson OAM
- Born: Francis Joseph Davidson; 12 January 1934; Black Rock, Victoria, Australia
- Died: 22 July 2022 (aged 88)
- Occupations: Singer, actor
- Years active: 1959–2001

Francis Joseph Davidson OAM (12 January 1934 − 22 July 2022) was an Australian entertainer who had several hit records in the 1960s, appeared on many TV variety shows, and acted in several Australian television police dramas, including Matlock Police and Bluey, as well as guest roles in soap operas including A Country Practice, E Street and Home and Away and a small role in film Muriel's Wedding.

== Career ==
Davidson was born in Black Rock, a suburb of Melbourne, Victoria.

While undergoing compulsory National Service training, he sang to entertain fellow recruits, and was an early adopter of the rock 'n' roll idiom. In 1959 he signed to W&G Records, and in 1960 found success with his single I Care for You.

His next success was a comedy song "Yabba Dabba Doo" (referencing the Flintstones catchphrase) in 1961, followed by "Have You Ever Been to See Kings Cross" in 1962, a humorous ditty sung at breakneck speed in Australian vernacular, which became a best-seller. It was released in New Zealand on Octagon OCT.028 that year. Singles & EP's Other comic songs followed: "Hector the Trash Collector", a spoof on John Farnham's hit "Sadie (The Cleaning Lady)", and "50 Million Blowflies Can't Be Wrong". In 1963, he won first prize in Export Talent, an Australia's Got Talent–type contest, which sent him to England, giving him valuable overseas exposure and experience. He returned to Australia in 1965, but over the next five years he spent much time performing in Europe and America, where he appeared on The Dick Clark Show. In 1970, he made two further comic songs in a country and western vein: "Gimme Dat Ding" and "Ball Bearing Bird". He also acted in several Australian TV series, the best-known being Homicide and Matlock Police.

In 1975, he changed labels, to M7 Records (a project of the Macquarie Broadcasting Service, Herald and Weekly Times and ATN-7), for whom he recorded around a dozen singles, including "I Love a Sunburnt Football" in two versions—Australian rules and rugby league—and "I Hope Your Chooks Turn into Emus (and Kick Your Dunny Down)". They also released his album, A Generation of Children's Hits, which included covers of "The Candy Man", "Rubber Duckie", "Three Little Fishies", "Puff, the Magic Dragon", "All I Want for Christmas Is My Two Front Teeth", "Any Dream Will Do", "The Ugly Duckling" also "Little White Bull" and "What a Mouth", two Tommy Steele classics.

In 1981, he released on Big Aussie BBQ, an album of familiar Australian songs, including the Slim Dusty favourite "Duncan", the traditional songs "Wild Colonial Boy" and "The Man from Snowy River", Peter Allen's "I Still Call Australia Home", and Joe Dolce's irreverent "Shaddap You Face".

== Discography ==
=== Charting albums ===
List of albums, with selected chart positions
Title	Album details	Peak chart positions
Title	Album details	AUS
Frankie Davidson	Released: July 1973; Format: LP; Label: M7 (MLF 018)	58

=== Charting singles ===
List of singles, with selected chart positions
Year	Title	Peak chart positions
Year	Title	AUS
1970	"Gimme Dat Ding"	21
1971	"The Ball-Bearing Bird"	55
1973	"I Love a Sunburnt Football"	79
1981	"The Australian Barbecue Song"	53

== Filmography ==
=== Film ===
Year	Title	Role	Type
1976	Caddie	Bar useful (uncredited)	Feature film
1982	Save the Lady	Blue	Feature film
1994	Muriel's Wedding	Sergeant	Feature film
2001	The Finder	Ted Sterling	TV movie

=== Television ===
Year	Title	Role	Role
1968	Contrabandits	Shepherd	TV series
1969	Woobinda, Animal Doctor	Towtruck Driver	TV series
1970	The Link Men	Frank	TV series
1970	The Rovers	Mechanic	TV series
1970	Dynasty	Athol McCauley	TV series
1974	Matlock Police	Bill Thomas	TV series
1975	Armchair Theatre	Bruce	TV series
1968-74	Homicide	Dave Tate / Ron Peterson	TV series
1976	Alvin Purple	Chassa	TV series
1977	Bluey	Fred Barnett	TV series
1983	A Country Practice	'Burrigan Bert'	TV series
1989	E Street	Fred	TV series
1990	Rafferty's Rules	Eric Graham	TV series
1991	Home and Away	Jake Wood	TV series
1998	All Saints	Stan Humphries	TV series
1999	Farscape	Newsstand Guy	TV series
2000	Water Rats	Boat Owner	TV series

== Awards ==
=== Mo Awards ===
The Australian Entertainment Mo Awards (commonly known informally as the Mo Awards), were annual Australian entertainment industry awards. They recognise achievements in live entertainment in Australia from 1975 to 2016. Frankie Davidson won one award in that time.

Year	Nominee / work	Award	Result (wins only)
1976	Frankie Davidson	Most Versatile Act of the Year	Won
