= The Tommy Steele Story =

- UK poster by Tom Chantrell
- Directed by: Gerard Bryant
- Written by: Norman Hudis
- Produced by: Herbert Smith executive Stuart Levy; Nat Cohen; Peter Rogers
- Starring: Tommy Steele
- Cinematography: Peter Hennessy
- Edited by: Ann Chegwidden
- Production company: Insignia Films
- Distributed by: Anglo-Amalgamated (UK); AIP (US)
- Release date: 30 May 1957 (UK)
- Running time: 70 minutes
- Country: United Kingdom
- Language: English
- Budget: £15,000

The Tommy Steele Story is a 1957 British film directed by Gerard Bryant and starring Tommy Steele, dramatising Steele's rise to fame as a teen idol. Along with Rock You Sinners, it was one of the first British films to feature rock and roll. In the US, where Steele was not well-known, the film was released under the title Rock Around the World. The film was announced in January 1957, three months after the release of Steele's first single "Rock with the Caveman".

== Plot ==
Shown as a flashback, Tommy Steele lives with his mother and father in their London home. He works with a bellboy until he injures his spine doing judo. In hospital he is given a guitar to help with his therapy and he starts to play to entertain patients and staff. He works as a steward on an ocean liner, performing in his spare time, and gets a job playing in a coffee bar. He is popular with audiences and gets a recording contract.

== Cast ==
- Tommy Steele as himself
- Chas McDevitt Skiffle Group
- Nancy Whiskey
- Humphrey Lyttelton & his Band
- Tommy Eytle's Calypso Band
- Chris O'Brien's Caribbeans ('The Caribbean' Club Band)
- The Steelmen
- Hilda Fenemore as Mrs Steele
- Charles Lamb as Mr Steele

== Production ==
=== Development ===
Producers Nat Cohen and Stuart Levy noted the success of low budget American rock musicals like Rock Around the Clock (1956) and thought they might be able to do a similar movie in England with Tommy Steele. "We knew that if we could sign him [Steele] in time we'd have a winner," said Cohen later.

Steele wrote in his memoirs that Cohen and Levy "were quite different from that other British film mogul, J. Arthur Rank. Where Rank was C. Aubrey Smith, Cohen and Levy were Abbott and Costello. They didn't so much as hold a meeting as do an act." He added "there was a degree of madness about them – but you had to be mad to take the chances they took – with a little eccentricity for good measure."

Steele agreed to make the film for a reported fee of £3,000. Variety put this at $7,000.

He met with Mike Pratt and Lionel Bart and they spent a month writing the songs. Bart considered the film premature, reflecting "Here's this guy, he's only 20, he ain't even started his story".

Norman Hudis was hired to write the script by Peter Rogers. Hudis completed his task in ten days saying "it was one of the easiest I've ever done" as "I was a cockney like Tommy Steele. I came from the same sort of street: I knew how he talked. I knew how he thought."

=== Shooting ===
Filming started at Beaconsfield Studios in 18 February 1957 at Beaconsfield Studios and took four weeks. Steele later recalled that director Gerald Bryant "was more like a poet than a showman."

== Reception ==
=== Box office ===
Hudis felt it "was an astute and alert move to make the subject but at most I thought it would be a sterling support film. The success of the film and the way it rocketed to first feature status knocked me for six."

The film was trade shown on 30 May 1957 and released in June. Nat Cohen called the movie "One of the most important, and certainly one of the most talked and written about, ot Anglo's current new British features."

In July, Kinematograph Weekly reported the film was performing strongly and "it obviously appeals to younger generation, but non-rock n rollers are also going for the genial and talented Bermondsey boy."

According to Kinematograph Weekly in December 1957 the film was "in the money" at the British box office for the year saying it "really went to town... playing repeat business with, if possible, even greater success." Another account listed it as the 13th most popular film at the British box office that year. Steele was voted the seventh most popular star in Britain for 1957.

Nat Cohen claimed the film "paid for itself in two weeks on the circuit" and was successful in Australia, New Zealand, South Africa and Scandinavia. He added "the boy's a natural film find." The film was one of the most popular releases of the year in Austria. The movie was the first "rock n roll" film released in Spain. A popular European tour by Steele added to the success of the film there.

The movie has been called Nat Cohen's "first really big hit".

Kinematograph Weekly argued in 1959 the success of the movie was a turning point in the fortunes of Anglo Amalgamated, writing "Cohen and Levy still blush at the budget but the picture is regarded as a Wardour Street phenomenon. It made a fortune within its first year and continues to make money in every corner of the world it plays." The magazine stated in another piece the movie "has shown the value of catering for teenage audiences. Nat rightly points out that the younger people still want to go out to the cinema and they have money to spend; and mostly more to spare than hard-pressed parents. So Nat and partner Stuart Levy hope to keep the pot boiling with the new programmes."

However academics Sue Harper and Vince Porter wrote the success of the film was "a flash in the pan" as Steele's subsequent movies were not as successful. These included two more for Cohen and Levy, The Duke Wore Jeans and Tommy the Toreador.

=== Russian release ===
In 1959, The Tommy Steele Story became one of the few British films shown in the Soviet Union after Steele made a three-day promotional visit to Moscow for a screening at the Kremlin. (Note: During the trip, USSR Minister of Culture Nikolai Mikhailov is reported to have told Steele he looked like "a member of the Young Communist League".)

=== Critical ===
Kine Weekly called it a "cheery, down-to-earth musical... At once authentic fairy story and ively song aibum, it's a cinch for the populars."

Variety reviewed the American release stating "it's been crudely Americanized... by adding intro footage by Yank deejay Hunter Hancock. However, it remains emphatically British in concept and largely in locale, even if more in the Cockney than the stiff-upper-lip tradition." The reviewer felt Steele had "an engaging personality and a fine set of pipes, worthy of a better idiom. Otherwise, biog is a slender story thread on which to hang a multitude of rock, calypso, ballad and rhythm & blues tunes."

Sight and Sound called it:

An inexpensive and unpretentious film; but it is notable for brief glimpses of a reality rare in British cinema. The smoke-worn bricks of Frearn Street; the Steeles' Bermondsey living-room with its cheap ornaments, gaudy crockery and sauce-bottle on the teatable; above all the easy, grinning, pocky-faced figure of Tommy Steele himself... Steele lives out his part with an ease and freedom from affectation which make you suddenly despair of the politer conventions of film acting.

Writing in Melody Maker, Tony Brown deemed Steele "a natural", commenting "he can amble in front of the cameras cocking a snook at RADA technique and still go over with a bang". Brown criticised the film's plot as having "no dramatic impact. Every thing, it seems, happened so easily", but praised the film's production value and concluded "it must be counted as a triumph for the Bermondsey boy. There should be a few red faces along Tin Pan Alley when it goes the rounds".

An uncredited writer for Bristol Evening Post praised Steele's performance in an "engaging" film that "could so easily have been embarrassing to anyone not addicted to the youth"

=== Legacy ===
The success of the film led to a boom in low budget British film musicals such as The Duke Wore Jeans (with Steele), Six-Five Special and The Golden Disc.

== Soundtrack ==
The Tommy Steele Story

Soundtrack album by Tommy Steele with the Steelmen
- Released: May 1957
- Genre: Rock and roll
- Label: Decca Records

Tommy Steele with the Steelmen chronology
Tommy Steele Stage Show (1957)	The Tommy Steele Story (1957)	The Duke Wore Jeans (1958)

The Tommy Steele Story is the first soundtrack album and the second album release by Tommy Steele, issued as a 10-inch LP by Decca in May 1957. The album's twelve songs were composed quickly by Lionel Bart and Mike Pratt, with Steele co-writing all but one. The soundtrack features a broader range of genres than Steele's previous releases, with Bart having convinced Norman Hudis that "they couldn't all be rock and roll songs if they were doing [Tommy's] story. He's a cockney kid, he's been in the merchant navy, so let's have some cockney songs, and let's have some calypso."

The soundtrack album was the first UK number one album by a British act. Its two singles, "Butterfingers" and the double A-side "Water, Water" / "A Handful of Songs", were both top-ten hits on the UK Singles Chart. In 1958, "A Handful of Songs" received the Ivor Novello Award for Most Outstanding Song of the Year, Musically and Lyrically. Tim Rice has described the song as "a lovely composition, a show song disguised as a pop song and it showed the way both of them were heading."

== Track listing ==
Side one

1. "Take Me Back, Baby" – 2:04
2. "Butterfingers" – 2:20
3. "I Like" – 1:43
4. "A Handful of Songs" – 2:07
5. "You Gotta Go" – 3:19
6. "Water, Water" – 2:19
7. "Cannibal Pot" – 1:55

Side two

8. "Will It Be You" – 2:09
9. "Two Eyes" – 1:46
10. "Build Up" – 2:24
11. "Time to Kill" – 2:00
12. "Elevator Rock" – 1:51
13. "Doomsday Rock" – 2:01
14. "Teenage Party" – 2:22

== Notes ==
- Steele, Tommy (2007). Bermondsey boy : memories of a forgotten world. Michael Joseph.
