= Never Trust a Ghost =

- Randall and Hopkirk (Deceased) episode
- Episode no.: Season 1 Episode 4
- Directed by: Jeremy Summers
- Written by: Donald James
- Production code: 04
- Original air date: 12 October 1969

Guest appearances
- Caroline Blakiston; Philip Madoc; Donald Morley; Brian Oulton; Edina Ronay; Peter Vaughan

Episode chronology
← Previous "All Work and No Pay"	Next → "That's How Murder Snowballs"

"Never Trust a Ghost" is the fourth episode of the 1969 ITC British television series Randall and Hopkirk (Deceased) starring Mike Pratt, Kenneth Cope and Annette Andre. The episode was first broadcast on 12 October 1969 on ITV. Directed by Jeremy Summers.

== Synopsis ==
One evening, whilst idly passing the time away, Marty witnesses an ambush outside the home of a wealthy civil servant, James Howarth. Mr Howarth arrives home and is threatened by a man waiting in the street and forced into his own house, where he is promptly shot. The killer then immediately gets on the telephone and tells somebody that his mission was a success and that there were no witnesses (unaware of Marty's presence of course) and reveals himself to be a Mr Rawlins in the process.

Marty immediately calls round to see Jeff and convinces him to call the police. Jeff rings a grumpy inspector Clayton, who seems to have a particular dislike for Jeff and is none too pleased at being disturbed in the middle of the night. Nevertheless he agrees to call on the Howarths as the seriousness of Jeff's phone call, suggesting that a murder has been committed, cannot be overlooked.

The inspector and Jeff turn up at the Howarth house and are greeted by a rather surprised Mrs Howarth. The inspector asks to see her husband but she refuses to disturb him. However, much to Marty's surprise he actually shows up asking what is going on. Marty insists that he saw him being murdered but can't explain how he's there! The inspector rebukes Jeff for wasting his time.

The next day Marty calls on Jeff and tells him that he's not satisfied and he knows what he saw. He eventually convinces a reluctant Jeff to pay the Howarths another visit with the ostensible excuse that he is apologising, whilst Marty does some investigating. Mrs Howarth answers the door and can't believe that Jeff would have the audacity to call again, however he pushes his way past her and rather rudely takes a seat in the living room, without being asked.

Just as Jeff is about to leave, Marty informs him that he has seen Rawlins in the study. Jeff then insists that he will wait for Mr Howarth to return and he'll wait in the study. Mrs Howarth is enraged and asks him to leave immediately, but he opens the study door and looks in. However the room is completely unoccupied and Marty is at a loss to explain where Rawlins has gone!

Mrs Howarth calls the police and Jeff is arrested by a gleeful Inspector Clayton who is keen to throw the book at him. However, for some unknown reason Clayton's boss calls him and is instructed to let Randall go. During this time Marty has been spending more time at the Howarth's house to try and get to the bottom of things. He discovers that the Mr & Mrs Howarth that have been talking to the police and Jeff are actually look alike imposters and the real Mr & Mrs Howarth are lying dead in the basement. He also discovers that the group are working for a foreign power and have a hidden photograph laboratory behind the bookcase in the study (explaining Rawlins' earlier disappearance from the study). Their motives are not revealed at this stage.

Marty immediately goes round to see Jeff and informs him of his findings. He tries to talk Jeff into breaking into the Howarth house's basement and take a look for himself. However, after the last two episodes Jeff is extremely reluctant. Once again though he eventually takes Marty's advice and breaks into the basement only to find, once again, that Marty appears to have led him up a gum tree and there are no bodies! During his attempt to get out of the basement the Mr & Mrs Howarth imposters spot him and they call the police.

In a panic Jeff calls Jeannie and asks for her help to come up with an alibi. He asks her to come round to his apartment, get into bed and, when the police call, to say that she's been with Jeff all night. She reluctantly cooperates with Jeff's plans and Inspector Clayton is once again robbed of his chance to incriminate Jeff.

Clearly exasperated by Marty's continual false leads Jeff decides to seek help from a psychic expert called Professor (also Dr) Plevitt and asks him if it's possible for a ghost to tell lies. Plevitt advises that they certainly may not always tell the truth, though they do not knowingly tell lies. He explains that they live in a 'fantasy world' and you must take what they say with a pinch of salt. Whilst Jeff is doing this the spies plot on killing him after they realise that the police have failed to apprehend him yet again. Marty hears this and gets back to Jeff who is, at that time, driving back to his office.

Marty tries to convince Jeff of this plot but Jeff is dismissive after his visit to Plevitt. Jeff placates Marty however by suggesting that he checks the office out first before he goes up there. Whilst Marty is doing this Jeff is shot at by Rawlins in a waiting car. The bullets put holes in Jeff's windscreen and narrowly miss him. Jeff's faith in Marty is once again restored and he returns to his office. Shortly after this Jeff is visited by Rawlins, masquerading as a potential client. However Marty recognises him and advises Jeff, whereupon a fight ensues. Unfortunately Jeff comes second in this encounter and is taken, unconscious, back to the Howarth house and is tied up.

The plan is for the spies to leave that night for the airport and leave the real Mr & Mrs Howarth's bodies in the living room with Jeff, who they plan to also shoot and make it look like he killed the Howarths and then shot himself. At this time the imposters reveal that they are spies for a foreign (undisclosed) country and that they chose Mr Howarth to impersonate as he is in charge of salaries for various British Intelligence agencies and, as such, he has access to every undercover agent's details used by the UK. The imposter Howarth has been busy photographing all the important documents whilst he has had access to his place of employment.

Marty pays Jeff a visit before the spies have had a chance to murder him and Jeff advises him to see Plevitt and convince him to call Scotland Yard and say that a murder is about to take place at the Howarth's address. Plevitt can see Marty but assumes that he is not telling him the truth. He insists that Marty takes some tests before he'll be convinced by the truth of what he's saying. Marty passes with flying colours of course and Plevitt eventually decides to call the police. They arrive in the nick of time just as the spies were planning on shooting Jeff and Jeff is finally able to give a first hand account of what's been going on to Inspector Clayton and the spies are arrested.

== Cast ==
- Mike Pratt as Jeff Randall
- Kenneth Cope as Marty Hopkirk
- Annette Andre as Jeannie Hopkirk
- Philip Madoc .... Rawlins
- Peter Vaughan .... James Howarth
- Edina Ronay .... Sandra
- Caroline Blakiston .... Karen Howarth
- Donald Morley .... Inspector Clayton
- Brian Oulton .... Dr Plevitt

== Production ==
Although the 4th episode in the series, Never Trust a Ghost was the 14th episode to be shot, filmed between December 1968 and February 1969.

A small amount of location shooting was done for this episode: the exterior of Jeff's apartment on St Johns Wood High Street, where Jeff is seen arriving in act one, Jeannie arriving by Mini and the arrival of the police car with Inspector Clayton in act two. When Jeff drives back from his visit with Dr Plevitt, exterior footage of the Vauxhall was shot on Great Chapel Street and Oxford Street. Second-unit footage of the exterior and street of Adams Furniture in Harrow for the sequence showing Jeff driving back to the Randall & Hopkirk office in the Vauxhall and being shot at by Rawlins, who then drives off.

Back projection footage seen behind Jeff and Marty in the studio shot car interiors consisted of footage of Goodge Street, Charlotte Street, Tottenham Court Road and Howland Street. Stock footage depicting London at night at the start of the episode consisted of shots of Berkely Street, Lambeth Pier and the Houses of Parliament. Stock shots of New Scotland Yard and the British Museum were also used. The street and exterior of Howarth's home were shot on the standing street sets on the backlot at Elstree studios.
