= Nairobi (disambiguation) =

Nairobi is the capital and largest city of Kenya.

Nairobi may also refer to:

== Geography and government ==
- Africa/Nairobi, a time zone identifier for East Africa Time
- Nairobi City Council, former local authority governing the city of Nairobi
- Nairobi City County, one of the 47 counties of Kenya
- Nairobi Dam, an embankment dam on the Nairobi River
- Nairobi National Park, in Kenya
- Nairobi River, which flows through Nairobi

== International agreements ==
- Nairobi Agreement, 1985, a peace deal between the Ugandan government and the National Resistance Army (NRA)
- Nairobi Agreement, 1999, signed by the Presidents of Sudan and Uganda, in relation to resolving the northern Uganda conflict
- Nairobi Convention, a regional framework agreement of 1985 for marine environmental management

== Buildings and organizations ==
- Nairobi Arboretum, located in Nairobi
- Nairobi Business Park, the first business park in East Africa
- Nairobi Hospital, in Nairobi
- Nairobi Java House, a chain of coffee houses based in Nairobi
- Nairobi National Museum
- Nairobi Securities Exchange, a voluntary association of stockbrokers based in Nairobi
- Nairobi Women's Hospital, in Nairobi
- Roman Catholic Archdiocese of Nairobi, the Metropolitan See for the Ecclesiastical province of Nairobi in Kenya, and the Primatial see for Kenya

== Education ==
- Nairobi Academy, a preparatory and secondary school in Nairobi
- Nairobi School, a national secondary school in Nairobi
- University of Nairobi (AKA UoN), a collegiate research university based in Nairobi
- West Nairobi School (AKA WNS), a Christian international school in Nairobi

== Transport ==
- Mombasa–Nairobi Standard Gauge Railway, under construction
- Nairobi Airport (disambiguation)
- Nairobi rail service, a network of diesel trains serving Nairobi and its suburbs
- Nairobi Railway Station, located in Nairobi

== Sport ==
- Nairobi City Stadium, a multi-purpose stadium in Nairobi
- Nairobi City Stars, an association football club based in Nairobi
- Nairobi Club Ground, a multi-use sports venue in Nairobi, the oldest cricket ground in Kenya
- Nairobi Marathon, an annual road running competition over the marathon distance held in October in Nairobi
- Nairobi Province Cricket Association, an affiliate of Cricket Kenya, responsible for cricketing activities in Nairobi
- Nairobi Stima F.C., an association football club based in Nairobi

== Arts and entertainment ==
- "Nairobi", a 1958 UK single by Tommy Steele
- The Nairobi Trio, a skit performed several times on television by Ernie Kovacs
- Nairobi (Money Heist), a fictional character in the series Money Heist

== Biology ==
- Nairobi fly, two species of beetle, Paederus eximius and Paederus sabaeus
- Nairobi grass rat (Arvicanthis nairobae), a species of rodent in the family Muridae, found in Kenya, Tanzania, and possibly Ethiopia

== See also ==
- History of Nairobi
- List of companies and organizations based in Nairobi
- List of tallest buildings in Nairobi
- Timeline of Nairobi
- Water supply and sanitation in Nairobi
