= Giddy Up a Ding Dong =

1953 rock and roll song

"Giddy Up a Ding Dong" is a rock and roll song which rose to prominence in 1956, when it was featured in the film Rock Around the Clock, starring Bill Haley. It became a hit in several countries for the group Freddie Bell and the Bellboys, and is perhaps their best known recording.

The song was written in 1953 by Freddie Bell and his friend Pep Lattanzi, but was not recorded until three years later after the group had signed to Mercury, and were spotted by film producer Sam Katzman. Katzman offered the Bellboys a part in Rock Around the Clock and "Giddy Up a Ding Dong" became their first Mercury release, and was featured in the film. The song was not a hit in the United States, but did achieve popularity in Australia, France and the UK, where it climbed to number four on the UK Singles Chart. The publicity for the single said, "If these sides don't move you, see a doctor – you're dead." The lyrics to the song are about a horse ride, with a definite western flavor, with the music having a loping, horse-like cadence.

The song was also recorded by Tommy Steele, and by Steele's brother Colin Hicks, whose version was a hit in Italy. British band leader Ray Ellington recorded a comedic version of the song which added a verse about the song's horse-rider encountering a romantic rival. Bill Haley & His Comets performed a unique version of the song during their 1958 European tour that used different lyrics referring to popular cowboy-film stars of the day (a performance of this version recorded at the Paris Olympia is preserved on the 2002 album release Vive la Rock and Roll (Big Beat Records: BBR 00073)).

== Other recordings ==
- The Sensational Alex Harvey Band
- The Equals
- Keely Smith
- The Crazy Rockers
- Lasse Holm, on his 1987 album Vindarna Vänder Om.
