= Get Yourself a College Girl =

1964 film by Sidney Miller

- Directed by: Sidney Miller
- Written by: Robert E. Kent; Robert G. Stone
- Produced by: Sam Katzman
- Starring: The Dave Clark Five; The Animals; Stan Getz & Astrud Gilberto; The Jimmy Smith Trio; The Standells; Freddie Bell-Roberta Linn and the Bell Boys; Mary Ann Mobley; Chad Everett; Joan O'Brien; Nancy Sinatra; Chris Noel
- Cinematography: Fred Jackman Jr.
- Edited by: Ben Lewis
- Music by: Fred Karger
- Production company: Four-Leaf Productions
- Distributed by: Metro-Goldwyn-Mayer
- Release date: 18 December 1964
- Running time: 87 minutes
- Country: United States
- Language: English
- Box office: $2,000,000 (US/ Canada rentals) (Note: This figure consists of anticipated rentals accruing distributors in North America.)

Get Yourself a College Girl, also released as The Swingin' Set, is a 1964 Metrocolor film comedy in the style of a beach party movie. The plot involves a college student who tries to balance her time writing songs and dealing with her publisher who tries to pursue her. It was directed by Sidney Miller and written by Robert E. Kent, and filmed at Sun Valley, Idaho, United States.

== Plot ==
Terry Taylor (Mary Ann Mobley) is a senior at conservative Wyndham College for Women (fictitious), and under an assumed name, a successful pop songwriter. After her publisher Gary Underwood (Chad Everett) unknowingly exposes her career, Wyndham's board of trustees—including the college founder's grandson, California State Senator Hubert Morrison (Willard Waterman)—condemns Terry for indecent behavior.

To distract herself from a possible expulsion, Terry, her friends Sue Ann Mobley (Chris Noel) and Lynne (Nancy Sinatra), and their physical-education instructor Marge Endicott (Joan O'Brien) travel to Sun Valley, Idaho, for a Christmas-break ski vacation. There, they meet Gary and his artist friend Armand (Fabrizio Mioni); Senator Morrison, who wants to solicit the youth vote; and Lynne's husband.

The Dave Clark Five, The Animals, and other musical acts perform in the background as Gary and Armand romance Terry and Sue Ann, respectively, while Lynne and her husband spend the entire vacation in their room. Senator Morrison courts Marge and shows that he is a talented dancer, but an embarrassing newspaper photograph threatens his re-election. The others demonstrate his support among the young by holding a successful telephone poll with musical performances.

== Cast ==
- Mary Ann Mobley as Teresa "Terry" Taylor
- Joan O'Brien as teacher Miss Marge Endicott
- Nancy Sinatra as Lynne
- Chris Noel as Sue Ann Mobley
- Chad Everett as Gary Underwood
- Willard Waterman as Senator Hubert Morrison
- Fabrizio Mioni as Armand
- James Millhollin as Gordon
- Paul Todd as Ray
- Donnie Brooks as Donnie
- Hortense Petra as Donna, the Photographer
- Dorothy Neumann as Miss Martha Stone, Dean of Wyndham College
- Marti Barris as Secretary
- Mario Costello as Bellboy
- Percy Helton as Senator's chauffeur
- The Standells as Themselves
- The Dave Clark Five as Themselves
- Stan Getz as himself
- Astrud Gilberto as herself
- Roberta Linn as herself
- The Bellboys as Themselves
- The Animals as Themselves
- The Rhythm Masters as Themselves
- The Jimmy Smith Trio as Themselves
- Gary Burton as himself

== Production ==
The film was known as Watusi A Go-Go, The Swingin' Set and The Go Go Set.

== Music ==
- Sidney Miller and Fred Karger wrote two songs for the film, "The Swingin' Set", performed offscreen by Donnie Brooks at the film's opening, and "Get Yourself a College Girl", performed in the film by Mary Ann Mobley.
- Stan Getz with the Stan Getz Quartet back Astrud Gilberto as she performs "The Girl from Ipanema".
- The Rhythm Masters perform "Beat Street Rag".
- Jimmy Smith with The Jimmy Smith Trio perform "Comin' Home Johnny" and the instrumental "The Sermon".
- Freddie Bell & Roberta Linn with the Bellboys perform "Talkin' About Love".
- The Standells perform "Bony Maronie" and "The Swim".
- The Dave Clark Five perform "Whenever You're Around" and "Thinking of You Baby".
- The Animals sing "Blue Feeling" and "Around and Around".
- Singer Nancy Sinatra, who would have a hit record two years later, appears in this film but does not sing.

== Reception ==
A contemporary review by Howard Thompson in The New York Times reported that the film "deserves — and gets here — a one-line verdict: idiocy strictly for the birds. Or maybe the Animals. They're in it, if anybody cares." Writing for DVD Talk, critic Paul Mavis described the film as "a good-looking, mildly amusing Sam Katzman cheapie for M-G-M, helped considerably by some socko musical numbers," adding that "the girls look great, the guys are handsome duds, and the music rocks and sways...but more laughs would have helped." A review of the film by critic Mel Neuhaus in Turner Classic Movies described it as a "curious 1964 hybrid of teen movie musical with pre-feminist overtones" and "a must-see due to its strange guest-star cast, who help elevate the formula narrative into a near-surreal '60s happening," further noting that "the choice of music guest stars is one of the most freakish conglomerations in any movie musical."

A review of the film in the Los Angeles Times called it "inoffensively silly". Filmink declared it was "a really fun, energetic movie that might've been a minor classic with a little more care, although it was at least done through MGM, benefiting from studio gloss."

== See also ==
- List of American films of 1964
