= My Late Lamented Friend and Partner =

- Randall and Hopkirk (Deceased) episode
- Episode no.: Season 1 Episode 1
- Directed by: Cyril Frankel
- Written by: Ralph Smart
- Production code: 01
- Original air date: 21 September 1969

Guest appearances
- Frank Windsor; Ronald Lacey; Anne Sharp; Dolores Mantez; Dave Carter

Episode chronology
← Previous —	Next → "A Disturbing Case"

"My Late Lamented Friend and Partner" is the pilot episode of the 1969 British television series Randall and Hopkirk (Deceased) starring Mike Pratt, Kenneth Cope and Annette Andre. The episode was first broadcast on 21 September 1969 on ITV and directed by Cyril Frankel.

== Cast ==
- Mike Pratt as Jeff Randall
- Kenneth Cope as Marty Hopkirk
- Annette Andre as Jeannie Hopkirk
- Anne Sharp as Fay Sorrensen
- Frank Windsor as John Sorrensen
- Dave Carter as Electrician
- Makki Marseilles as Manservant
- Tom Chatto as Doctor
- Ronald Lacey as Beatnik
- Harry Locke as Sid, the Night Porter at Jeff's apartment block
- Dolores Mantez as Happy Lee
- James Donnelly as Detective
- Anthony Sagar as Hotel Proprietor
- Harold Innocent as Hit Man

== Production ==
The exteriors of Jeff's flat were shot at Hanover House near the corner of St. John's High Street, North West London and Marty's flat exteriors were shot at a flat in Lauderdale Road in Maida Vale, West London. Their office exterior was represented by a doorway of Adams Furniture and Fabric store on the corner of Kymberly Road and Springfield Road in Harrow and the graveyard exteriors were filmed on the backlot at the ABC Elstree studios in Borehamwood, next to a row of poplar trees. Eaton Place in Belgravia, South West London (Sorrensen's home). Eaton Mews, North Belgravia (Happy Lee's home), and Queens Gate Terrace in Fulham Road. The final part of the episode features extensive footage shot in Central London including Cannon Street passing St Paul's Cathedral, Wood Street, St. Alphage Gardens, Roman House, St. Alphage High Walk and the junction of Moor Lane, with construction of the Barbican also visible.

The stunt arranger for the series was Frank Maher, who worked on Department S at the same time, he had previously performed the same job on Danger Man (1964–66) and The Prisoner (1966/67). Harry Fielder was the stand in/stunt double for Mike Pratt and Douglas Lockyer did the same for Kenneth Cope. Other stunt men used on the series included Rocky Taylor, Les Crawford, Alf Joint, Bill Sawyer and Mike Reid.

A finished print of the episode was completed in early October 1968. According to the ITC synopsis book to accompany the series, where it is listed as episode one, "This Episode Must Be Transmitted First."

Silent behind-the-scenes footage of this episode was included as an extra on the fourth region 2 DVD. Shot by a 2nd unit crew using stand-ins for the leads, the sequence ran to 53 seconds.
