= Nairoby =

Nairoby is a given name. Notable people with the name include:

- Nairoby Abigail Jiménez (born 2000), Dominican Republic badminton player

== See also ==
- Nairobi (disambiguation)
