= All Work and No Pay =

- Randall and Hopkirk (Deceased) episode
- Episode no.: Season 1 Episode 3
- Directed by: Jeremy Summers
- Written by: Donald James
- Production code: 03
- Original air date: 5 October 1969

Guest appearances
- Alfred Burke; Adrienne Corri; Dudley Foster; Noel Davis

Episode chronology
← Previous "A Disturbing Case"	Next → "Never Trust a Ghost"

"All Work and No Pay" is the third episode of the 1969 ITC British television series Randall and Hopkirk (Deceased) starring Mike Pratt, Kenneth Cope and Annette Andre. The episode was first broadcast on 5 October 1969 on ITV. Directed by Jeremy Summers.

== Synopsis ==
One evening two mysterious men pull up outside of Jeannie's apartment and produce a (very far fetched) remote control device which causes various items of furniture in her apartment to levitate and start moving around the room violently (akin to a poltergeist visitation). Terrified, Jeannie calls Jeff and runs out into the street. The two men leave the scene with a satisfied look on their faces.

The next morning the two men pay Jeannie a visit and reveal themselves to be brothers Henry and George Foster, working in the 'spiritualism' business. Preying on Jeannie's heightened state they offer her a job, paying much more handsomely than her current position with Jeff and tell her how her skills as a Private Detective's P.A. are much valued by the pair.

She tells Jeff about the two men and how she is seriously considering their offer, telling him about her disenchantment with the Private Detective business. Jeff is sceptical and advises her to 'let it ride'. However, Jeannie visits the Fosters that evening to give them her answer. Upon arrival she is greeted by a display of items of furniture flying around the room and Henry tells her that it is the spirit of her dead husband trying to communicate with her. However, Marty is present at the time and realises immediately that something phoney is going on, though he has no answers to explain the mobile furniture! Jeannie leaves the Foster's residence without committing entirely to the job offer, though she is very tempted by the remuneration package and the offer of the Fosters to communicate with Marty.

Meanwhile, in an effort to convince Jeannie that the business can pay, Jeff is busy pawning some very valuable possessions to raise £250 which he passes on to an (out of work) actress friend called Laura Watson. Ms Watson is a stooge for Jeff's plans and he sends Jeannie round to her place, explaining that she has lost her son. Ms Watson's job is to convince Jeannie that she is prepared to pay a large sum to help find her son and she produces Jeff's £250 as payment. However, during the course of the conversation, Jeannie discovers that Ms Watson really would like to make contact with her dead father instead, so Jeannie decides to put her in contact with the Foster brothers.

Ms Watson calls on the Fosters and is immediately disturbed by the appearance of the house and the brothers' rather eccentric behaviour. Once they discover that Ms Watson is all alone in the world they then reveal to her their sinister plans, which are to murder her then make contact with her from 'the other side'. The motivation for doing so appears to be their many years of failure in trying to contact the dead, which they rationalise is due to the spirits not knowing that they are trying to contact them. Ms Watson of course will know, so therefore she will make contact!

After a show of moving furniture, Ms Watson manages to escape through a window, but the Fosters follow close behind. Eventually, she finds that her path is blocked by a lake, and as she pulls her collar tight around her, the Fosters move toward her with an unsheathed sword.

Jeannie reports back to Jeff and explains that she only got £25 from Ms Watson and that she has referred her to the Fosters. Infuriated Jeff pays the Fosters a visit, hoping to find Ms Watson and his money there. George Foster answers the door to Jeff and explains that Laura Watson was there but that she has now left. However, Marty sees Henry incinerating some items of women's clothing and also sees him hiding a car outside of the property. Marty deduces that the Fosters have murdered Laura Watson and orders Jeff to go back and investigate.

When he returns to the property this time Henry Foster is waiting for him and orders him into the house at gunpoint. Realising that their scheme is now out in the open the brothers call Jeannie and ask her to come over. When she arrives she is also trapped with Jeff and the pair are advised of their impending demise.

The brothers put on a particularly violent poltergeist display and Marty then sees the equipment responsible for creating the phenomenon. He causes a power surge at the local power station and the equipment explodes, allowing Jeff and Jeannie escape and call the police, who arrest the Fosters.

As Jeannie drives Jeff back to his car in the woods, they notice a figure in the passenger seat. He opens the door to reveal Ms Watson wrapped in newspapers, who explains that she had to ‘swim for it’!

== Cast ==
- Mike Pratt as Jeff Randall
- Kenneth Cope as Marty Hopkirk
- Annette Andre as Jeannie Hopkirk
- Alfred Burke .... Henry Foster
- Dudley Foster .... George Foster
- Adrienne Corri .... Laura Watson
- Noel Davis .... Pawnbroker's Clerk
- Michael Rathborne .... Man in Laundromat

== Production ==
Although the 3rd episode in the series, All Work and No Pay was the 12th episode to be shot, filmed between November and December 1968. Exteriors of the Foster brothers' home were filmed at Stanmore Hall in Stanmore. Laura's flat exteriors were shot at Charlbert Street in North West London.

A finished print was completed by mid-May 1969. It is listed as episode 16 in ITC literature.
