= Brian Oulton =

English actor (1908–1992)

- Born: 11 February 1908; Liverpool, England
- Died: 13 April 1992 (aged 84); London, England
- Occupation: Actor
- Spouse: Peggy Thorpe-Bates (m. 1938; died 1989)
- Children: 2

Brian Oulton (11 February 1908 – 13 April 1992) was an English character actor.

== Biography ==
Born in Liverpool, Lancashire, Oulton made his acting debut in 1939 as a lead actor. During the Second World War he served in the British Army, and returned to acting playing character roles in 1946; he made a name for himself playing the same pompous character in numerous films, ranging from Last Holiday (1950) to Young Sherlock Holmes (1985). Many of his film roles were in comedies, and he went on to appear in several Carry On films.

In 1969, he appeared as an eccentric psychic medium in Randall and Hopkirk (Deceased) in the episode "Never Trust a Ghost"; as a hypochondriac GP in Doctor at Large; again as a GP in the episode A Cellar Full of Silence (1968) of the classic spy-fi series Department S; in the 1976 adaptation for television of Jilly Cooper's novel Emily; and in the 1981 Granada TV serial Brideshead Revisited. He was also a stage actor and playwright, writing and starring in productions such as Births, Marriages and Deaths (1975), and For Entertainment Only (1976). Brian Oulton's radio credits include the role of Cyril in the long-running children's favourite Just William. He also guest starred as Neil's father in The Young Ones episode "Sick".

Brian Oulton lived latterly in Stratford-upon-Avon and was married to the actress Peggy Thorpe-Bates (from 1938 to 1989, her death), best known for her portrayal of the wife of Horace Rumpole ("she who must be obeyed") in the first television series of John Mortimer's novels. The couple had two children, a son and a daughter.

== Selected filmography ==
- Sally in Our Alley (1931) as Minor Role (uncredited)
- Too Many Husbands (1938) as Pottelby
- Miranda (1948) as Manell
- Warning to Wantons (1949) as Gilbertier
- It's Not Cricket (1949) as Simon Herbage
- The Huggetts Abroad (1949) as Travel Clerk
- Last Holiday (1950) as Prescott
- Young Wives' Tale (1951) as Man in pub
- Castle in the Air (1952) as Phillips
- Will Any Gentleman...? (1953) as Mr Jackson
- The Dog and the Diamonds (1953) as Mr. Plumpton
- The Million Pound Note (1954) as Lloyd
- Doctor in the House (1954) as Medical Equipment Salesman
- The Crowded Day (1954) as Mr. Preedy
- Miss Tulip Stays the Night (1955) as Dr Willis
- Reluctant Bride (1955) as Prof. Baker
- The Deep Blue Sea (1955) as Drunk
- Private's Progress (1956) as M.O. at Gravestone Camp
- The Man Who Never Was (1956) as Wills Officer (uncredited)
- Charley Moon (1956) as Mr. Paxton
- Brothers in Law (1957) as Client
- The Good Companions (1957) as Fauntley
- Let's Be Happy (1957) as Hotel Valet
- Happy Is the Bride (1958) as 2nd Magistrate
- The Silent Enemy (1958) as Holford
- The Spaniard's Curse (1958) as Frank Porter
- Carry On Nurse (1959) as Henry Bray
- The 39 Steps (1959) as Mr Pringle
- I'm All Right Jack (1959) as Appointments Board Examiner
- The Devil's Disciple (1959) as Mr. Brudenell
- Carry On Constable (1960) as Store Manager
- A French Mistress (1960) as Third Governor
- There Was a Crooked Man (1960) as Ashton
- Suspect (1960) as Director
- The Bulldog Breed (1960) as Bert Ainsworth (cinema manager)
- No Kidding (1960) as Vicar
- Very Important Person (1961) as Scientist
- Raising the Wind (1961) as Concert Agent
- Hair of the Dog (1962) as Gregory Willett
- Jigsaw (1962) as Frank Restlin
- Steptoe and Son (1962) as Piano Owner
- The Damned (1963) as Mr Dingle
- Kiss of the Vampire (1963) as 1st disciple
- Carry On Cleo (1964) as Brutus
- The Intelligence Men (1965) as Laundry Basket Man
- Devils of Darkness (1965) as The Colonel
- Department S (1968) as Dr Davis
- Carry On Camping (1969) as Mr. Short
- Some Will, Some Won't (1970) as Mr Dale
- On the Buses (1971) as Bus Depot Manager
- Mr. Forbush and the Penguins (1971) as Foot Store Man
- Ooh... You Are Awful (1972) as Funeral Director
- Carry On Christmas (1972) as Oriental Orator
- The Old Curiosity Shop (1979) as The Schoolmaster
- Gandhi (1982) as Clerk of Court
- Young Sherlock Holmes (1985) as Master Snelgrove
