= Tommy Steele in Search of Charlie Chaplin =

Tommy Steele in Search of Charlie Chaplin is a 1971 British TV special about the origins of Charlie Chaplin. It stars Tommy Steele.

Steele visits south-east London, where he and Chaplin both grew up. The film covers the difficult experiences of Chaplin's childhood, including his mother being taken into a mental hospital, and his time in the workhouse where he had to face "the brutality of the birch".
