= Helen Ramsay =

American singer and entertainer (1932–2004)

Helen Ramsay (April 25, 1932 – April 1, 2004) was an American singer and entertainer. She is best known for being in the Lawrence Welk group "The Champagne Ladies" from 1947 to 1949, before being replaced by Roberta Linn.

== Life and career ==
Helen Ramsay was born in New Bedford, Massachusetts on April 25, 1932. She began in showbusiness at just aged 3, appearing on radio shows throughout her childhood. At peak she was traveling 300 to 400 miles every day touring the United States, "traveling cross-country with the accordion-playing conductor and a tribe of male musicians, performing in hotel ballrooms and concert halls", performing in venues such as the Roosevelt Hotel in New York City, the William Penn Hotel in Pittsburgh and the Trianon Ballroom in Chicago. Ramsay grew tired of the heavy touring and left The Champagne Ladies in 1949. She found work with New York's Bernie Cummins Orchestra, and later the Arthur Godfrey Show. In 1952, she married Johnny Haluko of the Xavier Cugat Band, and later became associated with Las Vegas, where the couple moved to. She was a performer for many years at the Showboat Hotel. She was later married to Russ Lawson until his death in 1993. Ramsay died in Las Vegas on April 1, 2004, at the age of 71.
