= A Disturbing Case =

- Randall and Hopkirk (Deceased) episode
- Episode no.: Season 1 Episode 2
- Directed by: Ray Austin
- Written by: Mike Pratt; Ian Wilson
- Production code: 02
- Original air date: 28 September 1969

Guest appearances
- David Bauer; Gerald Flood; Adrian Ropes; Michael Griffiths; Patrick Jordan; Geoffrey Reed; Max Faulkner

Episode chronology
← Previous "My Late Lamented Friend and Partner"	Next → "All Work and No Pay"

"A Disturbing Case" is the second episode of the 1969 British television series Randall and Hopkirk (Deceased), distributed by ITC Entertainment and starring Mike Pratt, Kenneth Cope and Annette Andre. The episode was first broadcast on 28 September 1969 on ITV. It was directed by Ray Austin.

== Synopsis ==
Jeff Randall initially collapses unconscious after being lightly thrown against a door by Phillip and Pentonville, the two hospital heavies, but later under hypnosis he beats some five men in fights, including Dr. Conrad. Marty is seen pulling objects such as a door towards Jeff's head by inhaling in this episode. When teleporting to a specific location he is also heard to say "Made it! My sense of direction is improving!"

== Cast ==
- Mike Pratt as Jeff Randall
- Kenneth Cope as Marty Hopkirk
- Annette Andre as Jeannie Hopkirk
- Judith Arthy .... Jennifer
- Patrick Jordan .... Smart
- Les White .... Hales, the Chauffeur
- Charles Morgan .... Arthur Phillips
- Michael Griffiths .... Inspector Nelson
- Adrian Ropes .... Sergeant
- David Bauer .... Dr. Conrad
- Gerald Flood .... Dr. Lambert
- Geoffrey Reed .... 1st Male Nurse
- Max Faulkner .... 2nd Male Nurse
- William Mervyn .... Whitty

== Production ==
The exteriors for The Lambert Clinic Nursing Home were shot at The Grocer's Institute on Grange Lane, Letchmore Heath. Whitty's home exterior was filmed at a private house named Aragon on Aldenham Road, Letchmore Heath. Arthur Phillips house was shot on the exterior standing backlot sets at ABC Elstree studios, Borehamwood.

In this episode Jeannie's presumably younger sister Jenny is introduced. Like actress Annette Andre who portrays Jeannie she is also real-life Australian, and the likeness between them is similar. Currently unemployed, she's staying with Jeannie from outside London, what she terms "the sticks".

A finished print was completed by late August 1969. It is listed as episode 22 in ITC publicity.

== Home media ==
The episode was released on VHS and several times on DVD with differing special features. "A Disturbing Case" was released by Carlton on DVD with the first episode "My Late Lamented Friend and Partner". Silent behind-the-scenes footage of this episode was included as an extra on the fourth region 2 DVD. Shot by a 2nd unit crew using stand-ins for the leads, the sequence ran to 1'06m.
