= Freddie Bell and the Bellboys =

American vocal group

Freddie Bell and the Bellboys were an American vocal group, influential in the development of rock and roll in the 1950s. Their recordings include "Hound Dog", "The Hucklebuck" and "Giddy Up a Ding Dong".

== Career ==
The group were established in 1952 by Freddie Bell, with Jack Kane (saxophone), Frankie Brent (bass / guitar), Russ Conti (piano), Louis Joseph "Chick Keeney" Cicchini (drums), and Jerry Mayo (trumpet). They were one of the first white groups to play the R&B hits of the day, and honed their act in the Midwest before landing a booking at the Sands Hotel in Las Vegas. They were later joined by Roberta Linn, who was married to Bell from 1961 to 1973.

In 1955, they made their first recordings for the Teen Records label, including an adaption of Leiber and Stoller's "Hound Dog" (first recorded by Big Mama Thornton). Freddie and the Bellboys' 1955 recording of "Hound Dog" would notably modify the lyrics of Big Mama's Thornton's version to make it so the song's subject was literally a dog rather than a cheating male lover. When performing the song in Las Vegas, they were seen by Elvis Presley, who was impressed and decided to record their modified version of song himself.

The group was signed to Mercury in 1956, and were also spotted by film producer Sam Katzman. He offered them a part in Rock Around the Clock, the first rock and roll movie, starring Bill Haley. The first single for their new label was shared with Jerry Wallace, who later hit with "How The Time Flies" on Challenge. This record, on the Mercury subsidiary Wing Records was "I Said It And I'm Glad" b/w Jerry Wallace, "Eyes Of Fire Lips Of Wine", which was released February 27, 1956. Their second single was released on the same date. The A-side "Ding Dong", was written by Bell and his friend Pep Lattanzi in 1953. Later known as "Giddy Up a Ding Dong", it was not a hit in the United States, but it was popular in Australia, France, and the UK, where it climbed to number four in the UK Singles Chart. The publicity for the single said, "If these sides don't move you, see a doctor – you're dead." The group also appeared in the 1956 film, Rumble on the Docks. In 1957, they became one of the first American rock and roll acts to tour the UK in 1956 when they supported Tommy Steele. They toured Australia in 1957 as part of Lee Gordon's Big Show, sharing the bill with Bill Haley and the Comets, LaVern Baker and Big Joe Turner.

In 1964, they appeared in the film, Get Yourself a College Girl, with 1960s groups such as The Dave Clark Five and The Animals. However, their international tours did little to enlarge the popularity of the group in America, where they had no hit records. They continued to do well for some years in Las Vegas.

Freddie Bell died, aged 76, in 2008. The final surviving member, Jerry Mayo died, also aged 76, on June 10, 2011.

== Band members ==
- Freddie Bell (September 29, 1931 – February 10, 2008)
- Frankie Brent (March 9, 1934 – August 26, 2002)
- Russ Conti (a.k.a. Russell Caltabiano) (October 20, 1933 – May 4, 1992)
- Jerry Mayo (August 31, 1934 – June 10, 2011)
- Gary Olds (Drummer/singer). He performed at Las Vegas and Los Angeles venues, and was Bell's musical director in the latter years of his life.
- Bobby Ruggiero (Drummer w/Freddie Bell 1983–1985). Freddie's favorite drummer. Still living, playing w/Van Morrison.
