= The Duke Wore Jeans =

1958 British film by Gerald Thomas

- Directed by: Gerald Thomas
- Screenplay by: Norman Hudis
- Based on: Lionel Bart; Mike Pratt
- Produced by: Peter Rogers
- Starring: Tommy Steele; June Laverick; Michael Medwin
- Cinematography: Otto Heller
- Edited by: Peter Boita
- Color process: Black and white
- Production company: Insignia Films
- Distributed by: Anglo-Amalgamated Film Distributors
- Release date: 30 March 1958
- Running time: 90 minutes
- Country: United Kingdom
- Language: English

The Duke Wore Jeans is a 1958 British comedy musical film directed by Gerald Thomas and starring Tommy Steele, June Laverick and Michael Medwin. The screenplay was by Norman Hudis who also wrote Steele's first film The Tommy Steele Story.

== Plot ==
The only son of the poor but aristocratic Whitecliffe family is to be sent to the nation of Ritalla in order to sell the family's cattle to upgrade the nation's livestock. As a side benefit, his parents hope he will marry the King's only daughter, Princess Maria. Unknown to his family, Tony is already secretly married to a commoner. Fate intervenes when drifter Tommy Hudson, who is the identical likeness of Tony, comes to the Whitecliffe estate to seek work. Tony engages Tommy to impersonate him on his trip to Ritalla accompanied by Cooper, the family's only servant.

Tommy and Cooper travel to Ritalla where Tommy pretends to be Tony. The princess refuses to meet him because she does not want to get married. Meanwhile, Prime Minister Bastini is scheming to force the King to abdicate since his daughter refuses to marry.

Tommy meets the princess and they fall in love.

== Cast ==
- Tommy Steele as Tony Whitecliffe / Tommy Hudson
- June Laverick as Princess Maria
- Michael Medwin as Cooper
- Alan Wheatley as King of Ritalla
- Eric Pohlmann as Bastini, Prime Minister
- Noel Hood as Lady Marguerite
- Mary Kerridge as Queen
- Elwyn Brook-Jones as Bartolomeo
- Clive Morton as Lord Edward Whitecliffe
- Ambrosine Phillpotts as Duchess Cynthia Whitecliffe
- Cyril Chamberlain as barman
- Martin Boddey as doctor
- Arnold Diamond as M.C.
- Philip Leaver as factory manager
- John Fabian as himself
- Susan Travers as stewardess
- Derek Waring as TV newsreader

== Production ==
Steele made the film because he was contracted to Nat Cohen and Stuart Levy for one more movie. He says the idea of the film was his, as he always liked The Prince and the Pauper. "It wasn't only a chance to act a bit, it was also an opportunity to kick around new musical ideas," he wrote later. "I wanted to act a good part and sing show numbers."

Steele was paid £20,000 plus 10% of the profits. Variety claimed his fee was $60,000 plus 10% of the profits.

Filming started 28 October 1957.

Peter Rogers says he found Steele "vain, conceited, bad mannered and the biggest crime of all, unprofessional." Bart pitched Rogers the idea of making a version of Oliver Twist starring Steele but Rogers did not want to work with the singer again.The producer claims he told Bart to turn the idea into a stage musical which led to Oliver!.

== Songs ==
The songs for the film were released in 1958 by Decca on a 10-inch LP, a 7-inch EP and two 7-inch singles and, in more recent times, on compilation CDs. The songs in the film include:

- "It's All Happening"
- "What do You Do"
- "Family Tree"
- "Happy Guitar"
- "Hair-Down, Hoe-Down"
- "Princess"
- "Photograph" (duet with June Laverick)
- "Thanks A Lot"

All of the songs were written by Lionel Bart, Mike Pratt and Jimmy Bennett (a pseudonym of Tommy Steele).

Steele said "Family Tree" in particular "proved Lionel Bart's talent as a wordsmith... It was a bastard to sing but I relished it."

== Soundtrack ==
=== Chart positions ===
Chart	Year	Peak position
UK Albums Chart	1958	1

Preceded by Pal Joey by Original Soundtrack	UK Albums Chart number-one album 26 April 1958 – 10 May 1958	Succeeded by My Fair Lady by Original Cast Album

== Reception ==
=== Box office ===
The film was not as commercially successful as The Tommy Steele Story but according to Nat Cohen it still recouped its costs in three months. Kinematograph Weekly said the film "didn't quite measure up to" Steele's first movie "but even so its returns were considerably above average."

=== Critical ===
Variety argued Steele "is lured into doing a certain amount of acting; and though no great shakes as a mummer, he emerges as a likeable personality with acting potentiality. At least he must now be regarded as a full-fledged artist rather than a possible flash in a lucrative pan."

The Monthly Film Bulletin wrote: "Tommy Steele has a large, warm personality and an endearing ease in the midst of this absurd modern-dress Ruritanian pantomime. He still has a tendency towards coyness or archness – a fault also of the young Ray Bolger, whom he often resembles – but one suspects that he will outlast the rock'n'roll era which fostered him. His departures from rock'n'roll in the present film prove, in fact, his best numbers. The august supporting cast too often betray a sense that they are slumming – with rather embarrassing results.

== Notes ==
- Steele, Tommy (2007). Bermondsey boy : memories of a forgotten world. Michael Joseph. ISBN 978-0-14-102802-6.
