= What a Mouth (What a North and South) =

1906 song written by R. P. Weston

Single by Tommy Steele

from the album Get Happy with Tommy
- B-side: "Kookaburra"
- Released: June 1960
- Recorded: 1960
- Studio: Decca Studios, London
- Genre: Pop
- Length: 2:45
- Label: Decca
- Songwriter(s): R. P. Weston

Tommy Steele singles chronology
"Little White Bull" (1960)	"What a Mouth (What a North and South)" (1960)	"Happy-Go-Lucky Blues" (1960)

"What a Mouth (What a North and South)" is a music hall song written by R. P. Weston in 1906 and first sung by Harry Champion. It is better known for the version recorded by Tommy Steele in 1960, which peaked at number 5 on the UK Singles Chart.

== Early versions ==
The song was often performed by Harry Champion, and was published as sheet music by Francis, Day & Hunter in 1906 as one of Francis & Day's Album of Cockney Songs. The first commercially released recording was by The Two Bills from Bermondsey — Bill Burnham and Bill French — who were recorded by Peter Kennedy at "The Cock & Monkey" in Bermondsey on 13 February 1954. The 78 rpm record, Parlophone R 3953, was released in January 1955.

== Tommy Steele version ==
=== Background ===
Steele recorded a cover of "What a Mouth" as it was one of his father's favourite songs. Steele's father told him that he knew he would be successful if he "became as successful as the Two Bills". As with the rest of the album Get Happy with Tommy, "What a Mouth" was recorded live at Decca Studios.

=== Track listing ===
7": Decca / F 11245

1. "What a Mouth (What a North and South) – 2:45
2. "Kookaburra" – 1:58

=== Charts ===
Chart (1960)	Peak position
Australia (Kent Music Report)	3
New Zealand (Lever Hit Parade)	7
UK Singles (OCC)	5
UK Disc Top 20	5
UK New Musical Express Top 20	4
UK Record Mirror Top 20	5
