= Roberta Linn =

American singer (born 1928)

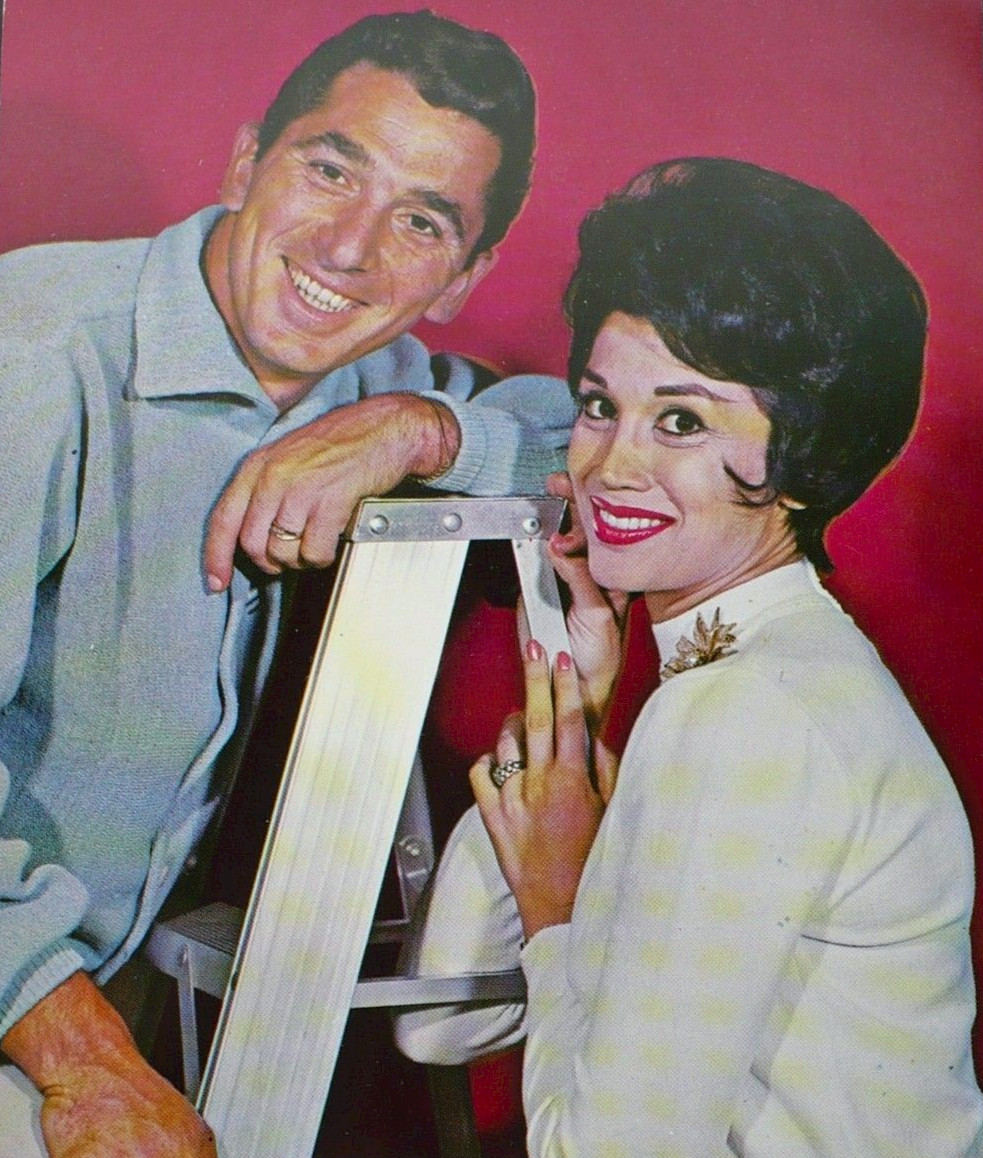
Freddie Bell and Roberta Linn at the Las Vegas Sahara

Roberta Linn (born April 30, 1931 in Gravity, Iowa) is an American singer and entertainer. From 1949 to 1954, she sang with the Lawrence Welk group. She was the Lawrence Welk Show first TV Champagne Lady. Linn is also closely associated with the Rat Pack and the Las Vegas Strip, where she was a regular solo performer beginning in 1955 at The New Frontier and then in 1961 with her husband Freddie Bell and the Bellboys at the Sahara Hotel. Linn continued performing in Las Vegas for 18 straight years at a variety of iconic hotels including the Stardust, Riviera, Dunes, Caesers, Desert Inn and the Sands at their Great American Songbook musical zenith in the 50s and 60s.

== Biography ==
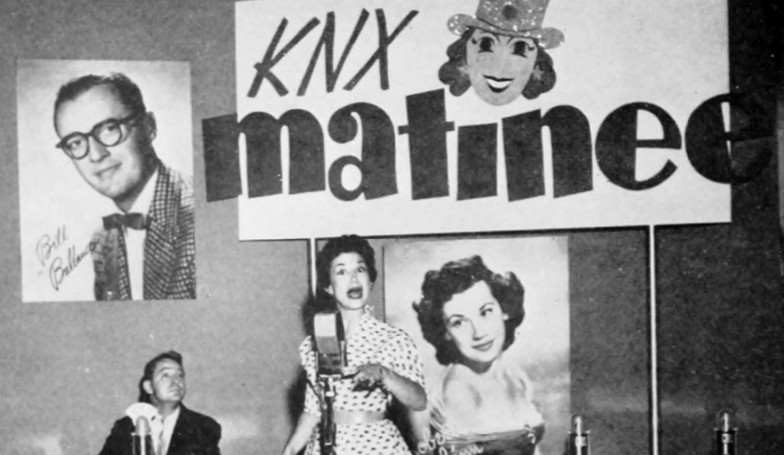
Roberta Linn at the microphone for the KNX Radio program "Matinee". Master of ceremonies, Johnny Jacobs, is seen at left.

Linn worked in films as a child actress; among the films she had roles in are Little Miss Marker and the Our Gang comedies. As Linn grew up, she found there were no film roles for her or many other former child performers. She became a vocalist and was a successful performer with many big bands.

Linn performed as part of "The Champagne Ladies" of Lawrence Welk from 1949 to 1954, replacing Helen Ramsay, and performing with Lois Best, Norma Zimmer and Jayne Walton. She often appeared in the early 1950s at the Aragon Ballroom of Santa Monica, and had her own Emmy-winning show on KTLA called "Cafe Continental" or "The Gypsy", which she left in 1954. In 1951, Linn was hired by Columbia Pictures to dub for songs such sung by Charlotte Austin in the film Castle in the Air (1952), originally titled Rainbow 'Round My Shoulder. At the time, Linn was known for songs such as "Wonderful, Wasn't It?" "Oh, Promise Me" and "Ain't Misbehavin'. A 1955 article wrote: "Roberta Linn expends enough energy to do an atomic reactor proud in her Terrace Room opening and draws plaudits from the crowd as a reward", noting how she "bounced" around the stage and praising her rendition of "Love is a Many Splendored Thing". In August 1954 she signed a record deal with Ekko Records. Linn also became the vocalist on a KNX Radio program in August 1954. The radio show, "Matinee", was aired on weekday afternoons.

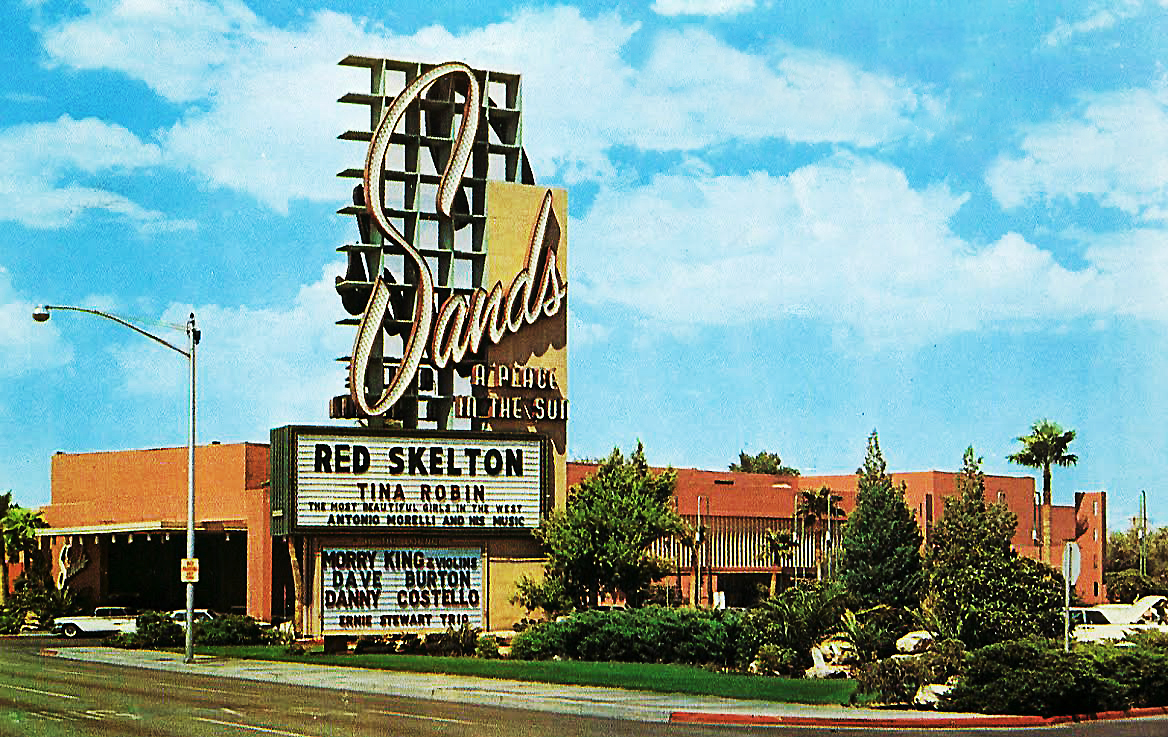
The Sands, where Linn was a regular performer

Linn became a regular performer with Freddie Bell and the Bellboys, being a performer at Sands Hotel and Casino, the Sahara Hotel, the Desert Inn, and other Las Vegas hotels in the 1950s and 1960s. She became associated with Frank Sinatra, who was a good friend, and the Rat Pack. She also performed in Vegas with Chicago mobster Johnny Marshall, before he was evicted, Linn also appeared in the lounge of Frank Sinatra's hotel on the California-Nevada border, Cal Neva Lodge & Casino. In 1964 she appeared on The Joey Bishop Show and in the film Get Yourself a College Girl, and recorded the album "The Bells Are Swinging" with Freddie Bell. She was married to Bell from 1961 to 1973. There is a large photograph with Linn as a Champagne Lady on display at the Lawrence Welk Museum in Escondido, California.
