= Nairobi Airport =

Nairobi Airport may refer to:

- Jomo Kenyatta International Airport, the major airport in Nairobi and Kenya, handling most inbound and outbound flights
- Wilson Airport (Kenya), a smaller second airport in Nairobi serving mostly light aircraft and small airlines
