= Tommy the Toreador =

1959 British film by John Paddy Carstairs

- Original UK poster
- Directed by: John Paddy Carstairs
- Written by: George H. Brown; Patrick Kirwan additional dialogue Sid Colin; Nicholas Phipps; Talbot Rothwell
- Produced by: George H. Brown executive Nat Cohen; Stuart Levy
- Starring: Tommy Steele; Janet Munro; Sid James; Bernard Cribbins
- Cinematography: Gilbert Taylor
- Edited by: Peter Bezencenet
- Music by: Stanley Black
- Production company: George H. Brown Productions (as Fanfare)
- Distributed by: Warner-Pathé Distributors(UK)
- Release date: 21 December 1959 (London)
- Running time: 90 minutes
- Country: United Kingdom
- Language: English

Tommy the Toreador is a 1959 British musical comedy film directed by John Paddy Carstairs and starring Tommy Steele, Janet Munro, Sid James, Bernard Cribbins, Noel Purcell and Kenneth Williams.

== Premise ==
A British ship docks in Spain and Tommy, a sailor from London, gets stranded after he saves the life of a bullfighter.

== Cast ==
- Tommy Steele as Tommy
- Janet Munro as Amanda
- Sid James as Cadena
- Bernard Cribbins as Paco
- Noel Purcell as Captain
- Virgílio Teixeira as Parilla, the Bullfighter
- José Nieto as Inspector Quintero
- Ferdy Mayne as Lopez
- Harold Kasket as Jose
- Kenneth Williams as Vice-Consul
- Eric Sykes as Martin

== Production ==
It was the third of three movies Tommy Steele made for Nat Cohen.

Janet Munro was borrowed from Walt Disney, who had her under contract. The film was shot at the Associated British studios in Borehamwood. There was location filming in Seville in May 1959. Steele says filming took 12 weeks and that Carstairs was a "chubby, jovial ball of energy... his direction was always precise and without fuss."

== Songs ==
The songs were written by Lionel Bart, Mike Pratt and Steele who had collaborated on The Duke Wore Jeans. Steele said their aim on the film were to present "a score of tunes and lyrics that joined the plot without ever stopping it in its tracks."

The songs included:

- "Tommy the Toreador"
- "Take a Ride"
- "Little White Bull"
- "Singing Time"
- "Where's the Birdie?" - sung with James and Cribbins
- "Amanda"

== Critical reception ==
In The Radio Times, Tom Vallance gave the film three out of five stars, and wrote, "perky pop star Tommy Steele, a former seaman himself, plays the part of a sailor in this lively and likeable musical comedy"; while Variety called the film "a brisk, disarming little comedy." Filmink wrote "it's a sweet film and Munro is delightful."

== Box office ==
Kine Weekly called it a "money maker" at the British box office in 1960.

== Legacy ==
Steele says the song "Little White Bull" helped him form a new career because children loved the song and parents would bring them to his rock concerts to hear it.

== Notes ==
- Steele, Tommy (2007). Bermondsey boy : memories of a forgotten world. Michael Joseph. ISBN 9780141028026.
