= Little White Bull =

1959 single by Tommy Steele

Single by Tommy Steele

from the EP Tommy the Toreador
- B-side: "Singing Time"
- Released: 6 November 1959
- Genre: Rock and roll
- Length: 3:40
- Label: Decca
- Songwriter(s): Lionel Bart; Mike Pratt; Tommy Steele

Tommy Steele singles chronology
"You Were Mine" (1959)	"Little White Bull" (1959)	"What a Mouth (What a North and South)" (1960)

"Little White Bull" is a song by English rock and roll singer Tommy Steele, released as a single in November 1959. It was included on the EP Tommy the Toreador from the film of the same name in which Steele also starred. Steele's royalties from the single's sales were donated to the "Variety Club of Great Britain fund for a cancer research unit for children". The song peaked at number 6 on the UK Singles Chart and it was awarded a silver disc in January 1960 for 250,000 sales in Britain.

== Reception ==
Reviewed in Melody Maker, both sides were described as "easy-to-listen-to numbers, especially Little White Bull, which has a Children's Hour flavour about it". Reviewing for Disc, Don Nicholl described "Little White Bull" as "a jingly novelty ballad with Tommy using his Cockney accent for the title phrasing".

== Track listing ==
7": Decca / F 11177

1. "Little White Bull" – 3:40
2. "Singing Time" – 1:33

== Charts ==
Chart (1960)	Peak position
Australia (Kent Music Report)	20
Ireland (Evening Herald)	3
UK Singles (OCC)	6
