= Freddie Bell =

American musician

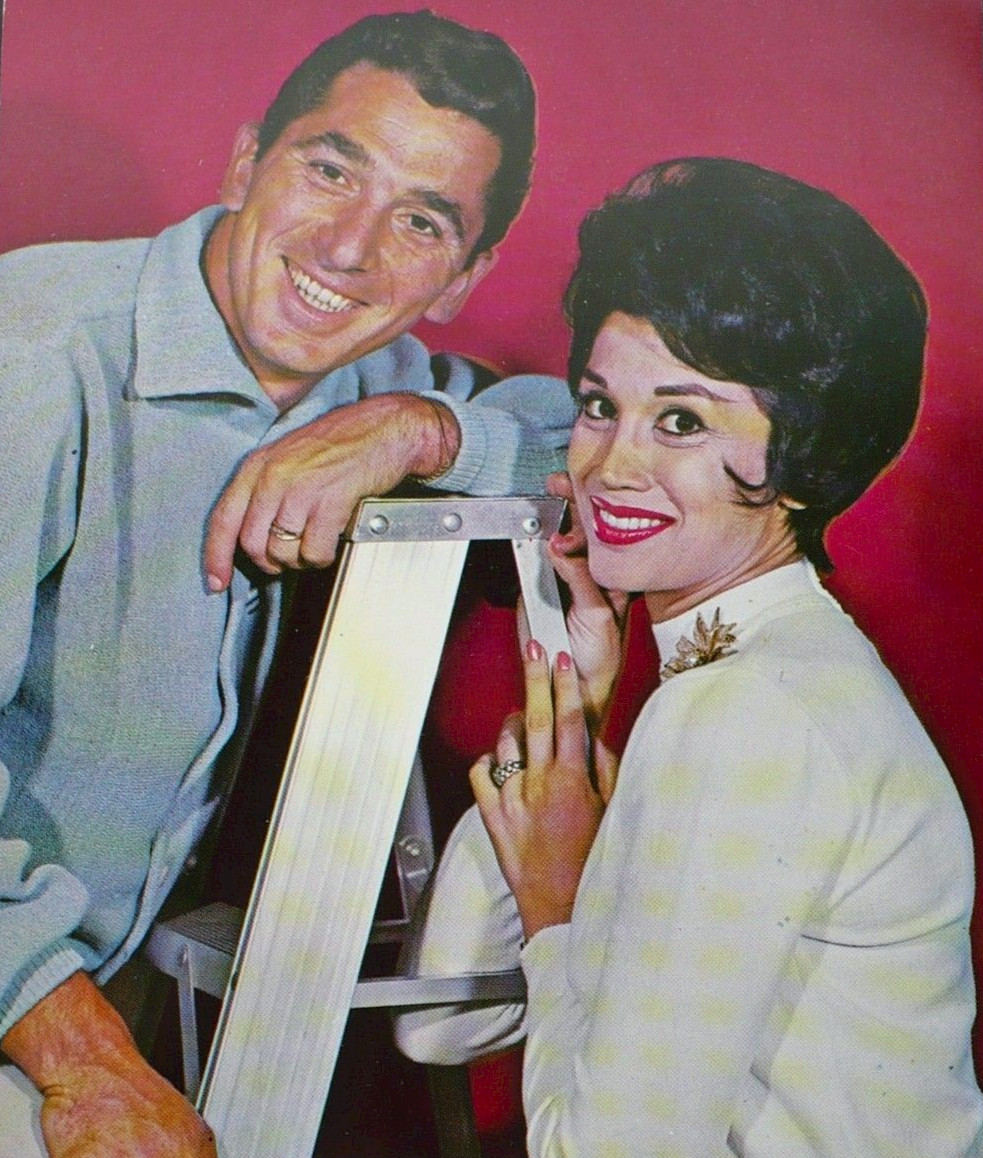
Bell with wife Roberta Linn at the Las Vegas Sahara Hotel

Ferdinando Dominick Bello, known as Freddie Bell (September 29, 1931 – February 10, 2008), was an American musician, whose group, Freddie Bell and the Bellboys, were influential in the development of rock and roll in the 1950s. He was a prominent performer with the group on the Las Vegas Strip in the 1950s and 1960s, and continued to perform in Las Vegas into his later years after the demise of the group.

== Biography ==
Bell was born in Philadelphia, Pennsylvania to Italian American parents, who were shopkeepers. He grew up in New Jersey. He became a trombonist, bassist, drummer, and singer, playing in various bands including that of Ernie Ventura. In 1952 he formed his own group, the Bellboys, with Jack Kane (saxophone), Frankie Brent (bass / guitar), Russ Conti (piano), Chick Keeney (drums), and Jerry Mayo (trumpet). They were one of the first white groups to play the R&B hits of the day, and honed their act in the Midwest before landing a booking at the Sands Hotel and Casino in Las Vegas.

In 1955, the group made their first recordings for the Teen Records label, including a cover version of Leiber and Stoller's "Hound Dog" (first recorded by Big Mama Thornton). When performing the song in Las Vegas, they were seen by Elvis Presley, who was impressed and decided to record the song himself. Freddie Bell and the group became closely associated with Las Vegas in the 1950s and 1960s, performing regularly at The Sands, the Desert Inn, the Sahara Hotel, the Flamingo Hotel and other venues. The group were later joined by Roberta Linn, who was married to Bell from 1961 to 1973. He continued to perform in Las Vegas into his later years after the demise of the group in the mid 1960s.

Bell's last recording was Those Were The Nights (2006), a tribute song written by Richard Friedland and Ray Stribe which showcased Las Vegas legends Babe Pier, Carme and Peter Anthony along with Freddie.

Freddie Bell was married four times and had six children and a stepson.

Freddie Bell died, aged 76, on 10 February 2008 in Las Vegas.
