= Rock with the Caveman =

1956 single by Tommy Steele and the Steelmen

Single by Tommy Steele and the Steelmen
- B-side: "Rock Around the Town"
- Released: 12 October 1956
- Recorded: 24 September 1956
- Studio: Decca Studios, London
- Genre: Rock and roll
- Length: 1:53
- Label: Decca
- Songwriters: Tommy Steele; Mike Pratt; Lionel Bart
- Producer: Hugh Mendl

Tommy Steele and the Steelmen singles chronology
"Rock with the Caveman" (1956)	"Doomsday Rock" (1956)

"Rock with the Caveman" is the debut single by Tommy Steele and the Steelmen, released in October 1956. It peaked at number 13 on the UK Singles Chart (compiled by the New Music Express), making it one of the first British rock and roll records to chart.

== Background and recording ==
Steele was discovered by Lionel Bart and along with Mike Pratt the three formed a group known as the Cavemen. After being seen by Decca Records' A&R representative Hugh Mendl, Steele was signed to Decca. "Rock with the Caveman" was originally a comedy number, described by Steele as "a joke, a spoof, the sort of thing Monty Python might have done". It was Steele's first recording, recorded at Decca Studios on 24 September 1956, produced by Mendl with engineer Arthur Lilley. Steele was backed by a number of well-known jazz session musicians, including pianist Dave Lee from Johnny Dankworth's band and tenor saxophonist Ronnie Scott.

After the success of "Rock with the Caveman", Steele was dubbed "Britain's Elvis" and only a month later was voted one of the top-ten British singers in a New Musical Express poll. After his follow-up single "Doomsday Rock" failed to chart, Steele topped the chart with "Singing the Blues". A live version of "Rock with the Caveman", recorded at London's Conway Hall the night before Steele's twentieth birthday, features on his first album Tommy Steele Stage Show, released in March 1957.

== Release and reception ==
The single was reported to have sold 25,000 copies in its first week of release.

Writing under his Alley Cat pseudonym, Maurice Kinn of the NME felt "Rock with the Caveman" lacked "the essential authentic flavour" of American rock and roll and praised "Ronnie Scott's driving tenor-sax playing" as the record's best feature.

Among retrospective reviews, Bruce Eder of AllMusic considered "Rock with the Caveman" "a curiously bland, formulaic effort at rock & roll, its use of the word "rock" in the lyrics more than its style identifying it, though [Steele] and the band do play hard". Writing in The Times, Bob Stanley described the song as "charming and gawky, midway between a raucous tribute to rock’n’roll and a cartoonish parody".

== Track listing ==
7": Decca / F 10795

1. "Rock with the Caveman" – 1:53
2. "Rock Around the Town" – 1:52

== Personnel ==
According to Sebastian Lassandro;

- Tommy Steele – vocals, guitar
- Ronnie Scott – tenor saxophone
- Benny Green – saxophone
- Major Holley – upright bass
- Bert Weedon – electric guitar
- Dave Lee – piano
- Kirk Dunning – drums

== Charts ==
Chart (1956)	Peak position
UK Melody Maker Top 20	15
UK New Musical Express Top 30	13
UK Record Mirror Top 20	11
