= Lionel Bart =

English composer and writer (1930–1999)

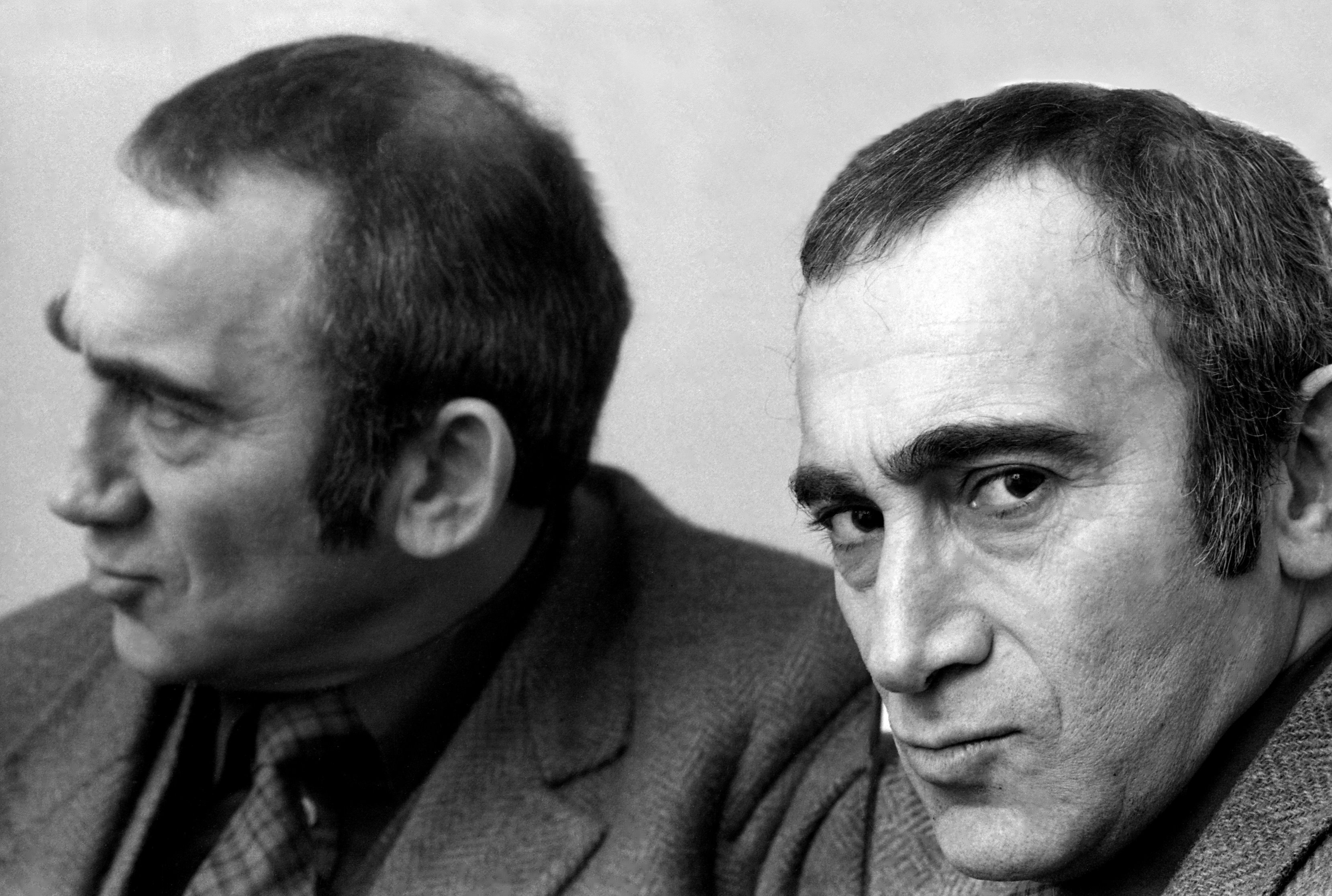
- Bart in 1973, by Allan Warren
- Born: Lionel Begleiter; 1 August 1930; Stepney, London, England
- Died: 3 April 1999 (aged 68); Acton, London, England
- Burial place: Golders Green Crematorium, London, England
- Occupations: Composer and writer
- Years active: 1952–1999

Lionel Bart (1 August 1930 – 3 April 1999) was an English writer and composer of pop music and musicals. He co-wrote Tommy Steele's "Rock with the Caveman" and was the sole creator of the musical Oliver! (1960). With Oliver! and his work alongside theatre director Joan Littlewood at Theatre Royal, Stratford East, he played an instrumental role in the 1960s birth of the British musical theatre scene after an era when American musicals had dominated the West End.

Best known for creating the book, music and lyrics for Oliver!, Bart was described by Andrew Lloyd Webber as "the father of the modern British musical". In 1963 he won the Tony Award for Best Original Score for Oliver!, and the 1968 film version of the musical won a total of six Academy Awards including the Academy Award for Best Picture.

Some of his other songs include the theme song to the James Bond film From Russia with Love, and the songs "Living Doll" by Cliff Richard, "Far Away" by Shirley Bassey, "Do You Mind?" (recorded by both Anthony Newley and Andy Williams), "Big Time" (a 1961 cover by Jack Jones of his show tune from Fings Ain't Wot They Used T'Be), "Easy Going Me" by Adam Faith, "Always You And Me" by Russ Conway, and several songs recorded by Tommy Steele ("A Handful of Songs", "Butterfingers" and "Little White Bull"). By the mid 1960s, he was as well known for his outlandish lifestyle, his celebrity friends, his excesses and his parties, as he was for his work.

== Early life ==
He was born Lionel Begleiter, the youngest of seven surviving children of Galician Jews, Yetta (née Darumstundler) and Morris Begleiter, a master tailor. He grew up in Stepney; his father worked in the area as a tailor in a garden shed. The family had escaped the pogroms against Jews by Ukrainian cossacks in Galicia.

As a young man he was an accomplished painter. When Bart was aged six, a teacher told his parents that he was a musical genius. His parents gave him an old violin, but he did not apply himself and the lessons stopped.

== Songwriting ==
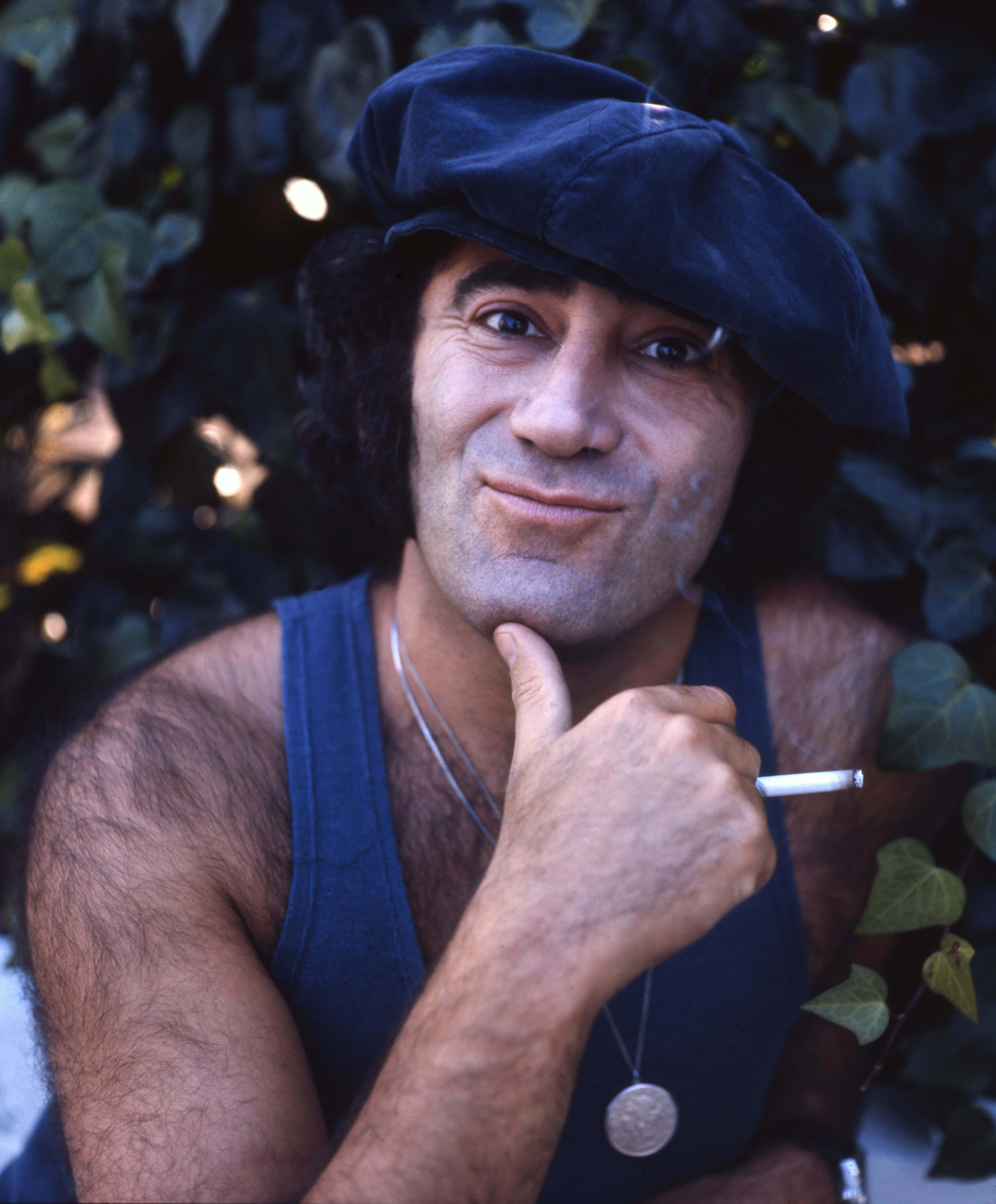
Bart in 1973

He started his songwriting career in amateur theatre, first at The International Youth Centre in 1952 where he and a friend wrote a revue together called IYC Revue 52. The following year the pair auditioned for a production of the Leonard Irwin play The Wages of Eve at London's Unity Theatre. Shortly afterward Bart began composing songs for Unity Theatre productions, contributing material (including the title song) to its 1953 revue Turn It Up, and songs for its 1953 pantomime, an agitprop version of Cinderella. While at the Unity he was talent-spotted by Joan Littlewood, and so joined Theatre Workshop. He also wrote comedy songs for the Sunday lunchtime BBC radio programme The Billy Cotton Band Show.

He first gained widespread recognition through his pop songwriting, penning numerous hits for the stable of young male singers promoted by artist manager and music publisher Larry Parnes. Bart's pop output in this period includes the hits "Living Doll" (written for Cliff Richard) and "Rock with the Caveman", "Handful of Songs", "Butterfingers" and "Little White Bull" (all for Tommy Steele). During this period, Steele and Mike Pratt were his songwriting partners. He won three Ivor Novello Awards in 1957, a further four in 1958, and two in 1960. He wrote the theme song for the 1963 James Bond film From Russia with Love, and worked with John Barry again on the score to the 1964 film Man in the Middle. His other hits include "Do You Mind", recorded by both Andy Williams and Anthony Newley, whose recording reached number one on the UK charts on 30 March 1960 and was the 100th song to do so, "Big Time" (a 1961 cover by Jack Jones of his show tune from Fings Ain't Wot They Used T'Be), "Easy Going Me" (Adam Faith), and "Always You and Me" (with Russ Conway).

Bart was also responsible for the discovery of two of Parnes' biggest stars. It was on his recommendation that Parnes went to see singer Tommy Hicks, whom he signed and renamed Tommy Steele, and Bart also suggested that Parnes see singer Reg Smith, who was then performing at the Condor Club. Although Parnes missed his performance, he went round to Smith's house and signed him up on the basis of Bart's recommendation. Smith went on to score a number of UK hits under his new stage name, Marty Wilde.

Twenty-seven years after it became a number one hit for Cliff Richard, "Living Doll" was re-recorded by The Young Ones and Richard for Comic Relief, and spent another three weeks at number one.

== Musical theatre ==
In 1958, Unity Theatre, a left-wing, London-based amateur theatre club, staged the musical Wally Pone, King of Soho, Bart's adaptation of Ben Jonson's Volpone, for an eight-week run. Bart's first professionally produced musical was 1959's Lock Up Your Daughters, based on the 18th-century play Rape upon Rape by Henry Fielding. Following that, Fings Ain't Wot They Used T'Be, produced by Joan Littlewood's Theatre Workshop, was noted for encouraging the use of authentic Cockney accents on the London stage and bringing an end to censorship of British theatre. Oliver! (1960), based on Dickens's Oliver Twist, was a major success. The music for Oliver! was transcribed by Eric Rogers, who wrote and composed 21 scores for the Carry On films. Bart hummed the melodies and Rogers wrote the notes on his behalf as Bart could not read or write music.

In 1968 Oliver! was made into a movie starring Ron Moody, Oliver Reed and Shani Wallis that won several Oscars, including best film. It is estimated that around this time Bart was earning 16 pounds a minute from Oliver!

Bart's next two musicals, Blitz! (1962) (from which came the song "Far Away", a hit for Shirley Bassey) and Maggie May (1964) had successful and respectable West End runs (Blitz!, at the time London's most expensive musical ever, had a run of 568 performances), but Twang!! (1965), a musical based on the Robin Hood legend, was a flop and La Strada (1969), which opened on Broadway after the removal of most of Bart's songs, closed after only one performance. By this time Bart was taking LSD and other drugs and was drinking heavily.

Bart used his personal finances to try to rescue his last two productions, selling his past and future rights to his work, including Oliver! which he sold to the entertainer Max Bygraves for £350 (Bygraves later sold them on for £250,000) to realise capital to finance the shows; Bart later estimated that this action lost him over £1 million. By 1972, Bart was bankrupt with debts of £73,000. A twenty-year period of depression and alcoholism ensued. He eventually stopped drinking, although the years of substance abuse seriously damaged his health, leaving him with diabetes and impaired liver function.

He wrote Next Year in Jerusalem in 1975–1976, but it was not staged until 2021 in a virtual performance at the Jewish Music Institute featuring Maureen Lipman. In May 1977, an autobiographical musical called Lionel! opened in the West End at the New London Theatre. It was loosely based on Bart's early life as a child prodigy. Bart added some new songs for the show. The cast included Clarke Peters, Marion Montgomery and Adrienne Posta. The role of Lionel was shared by a young Todd Carty and Chris Nieto. The show closed after six weeks.

== Later life ==
Bart continued writing songs and themes for films, but his only real success in his later years was "Happy Endings", a song he wrote for a 1989 Abbey National advertising campaign, which featured Bart playing the piano and singing to children.

He received a special Ivor Novello Award for life achievement in 1986. In 1987, encouraged by long-time friend Barry Humphries, he travelled to Australia to attend the opening of a new production of Blitz!, which was then revived in London's West End in 1990 by the National Youth Theatre of Great Britain to commemorate the 50th anniversary of the London blitz. In April 1991, he appeared on This Is Your Life. Cameron Mackintosh, who owned half the rights to Oliver!, revived the musical at the London Palladium in 1994 in a version featuring rewrites by Bart. Mackintosh gave Bart a share of the production royalties. At the peak of his career, Bart was romantically linked in the media with singers Judy Garland and Alma Cogan, though he was homosexual. His sexual preferences were known to friends and colleagues, but he did not announce them publicly until a few years before his death.

Bart died at the Hammersmith Hospital in West London on 3 April 1999, of liver cancer. A memorial bench is dedicated to him in Kew Gardens.

A workshop of a musical based on Bart's life and using his songs, It's a Fine Life, was staged in 2006 at the Queen's Theatre, Hornchurch. A later version titled More! was presented in concert at Theatre Royal Stratford East in 2015 featuring Neil McDermott as Bart, Jessica Hynes as Joan Littlewood and Sonny Jay as Charlene, with an appearance by 1960s pop-star Grazina Frame, who was an original cast member in Bart's Blitz!.

== West End theatrical credits ==
- Lock Up Your Daughters (1959) – lyrics
- Fings Ain't Wot They Used T'Be (1959) – music, lyrics
- Oliver! (1960) – music, lyrics, book. Oliver! was also produced on Broadway in 1963, winning a Tony Award for Best Composer and Lyricist and receiving nominations for Best Musical and Best Author of a Musical. A return Broadway engagement of the original production played in 1965, and a Broadway revival was mounted in 1984.
- Blitz! (1962) – music, lyrics, book
- Maggie May (1964) – music, lyrics
- Twang!! (1965) – music, lyrics
- La Strada (1969) – co-composer, co-lyricist. A Broadway production opened the same year.
- Lionel! (1977) – music, lyrics

== See also ==
- Category:Songs written by Lionel Bart

== Sources ==
- Chambers, Colin. The Story of Unity Theatre ISBN 0-85315-587-9
- Roper, David. Bart! The Unauthorized Life & Times, Ins and Outs, Ups and Downs of Lionel Bart ISBN 1-85793-330-3
- Stafford, David and Caroline. Fings Ain't Wot They Used T'Be – The Lionel Bart Story, Omnibus Press, 2011 ISBN 978-1-84938-661-6
