= Tommy Steele =

English entertainer (born 1936)

Sir Tommy Steele OBE
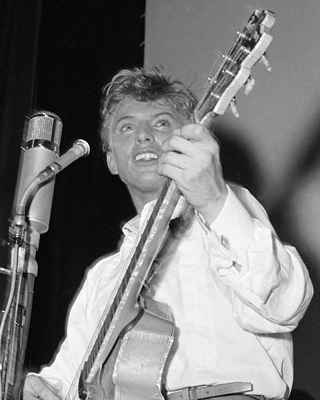
- Steele performing in Stockholm in 1957

Background information
- Born: Thomas Hicks; 17 December 1936 (age 89); London, England
- Genres: Rock and roll, skiffle
- Occupations: Singer, actor
- Instruments: Vocals, guitar, banjo
- Years active: 1956–present
- Labels: Decca, Columbia, RCA Victor
- Spouse: Ann Donoghue (m. 1960)

Sir Thomas Hicks (born 17 December 1936), known professionally as Tommy Steele, is an English entertainer, regarded as Britain's first teen idol and rock and roll star.

After being discovered at the 2i's Coffee Bar in Soho, London, Steele recorded a string of hit singles including "Rock with the Caveman" (1956) and the chart-topper "Singing the Blues" (1957). Steele's rise to fame was dramatised in The Tommy Steele Story (1957), the soundtrack of which was the first British album to reach number one on the UK Albums Chart. With collaborators Lionel Bart and Mike Pratt, Steele received the 1958 Ivor Novello Award for Most Outstanding Song of the Year for "A Handful of Songs". He starred in further musical films including The Duke Wore Jeans (1958) and Tommy the Toreador (1959), the latter spawning the hit "Little White Bull".

Steele shifted away from rock and roll in the 1960s, becoming an all-round entertainer. He originated the part of Kipps in Half a Sixpence in the West End and on Broadway, reprising his role in the 1967 film version. As an actor, he notably appeared in the films The Happiest Millionaire (1967) and Finian's Rainbow (1968) and as the lead in several West End productions of Singin' in the Rain. Also an author and sculptor, Steele remains active. He was knighted in the 2020 Birthday Honours for services to entertainment and charity and was awarded the Freedom of the City of London in 2021.

== Early life ==
Steele was born Thomas Hicks in Bermondsey, London, in 1936. His father, Thomas Walter Hicks, was a racing tipster and his mother, Elizabeth "Betty" Ellen Bennett, worked in a factory; they had married in 1933, in Bermondsey.

As a child, Steele spent time in hospital for porphyria. He dreamt of being a star performer after his parents took him to the London Palladium, but "didn't think you could be English and be a star". In 1952, at the age of 15, Steele joined the Merchant Navy, working on the Cunard line. He was not eligible for national service because of a diagnosis of cardiomyopathy.

Through his paternal line, the full family name (Still-Hicks) influenced his future stage name, as he adapted it to become known professionally as Tommy Steele.

== Career ==
=== Singer ===
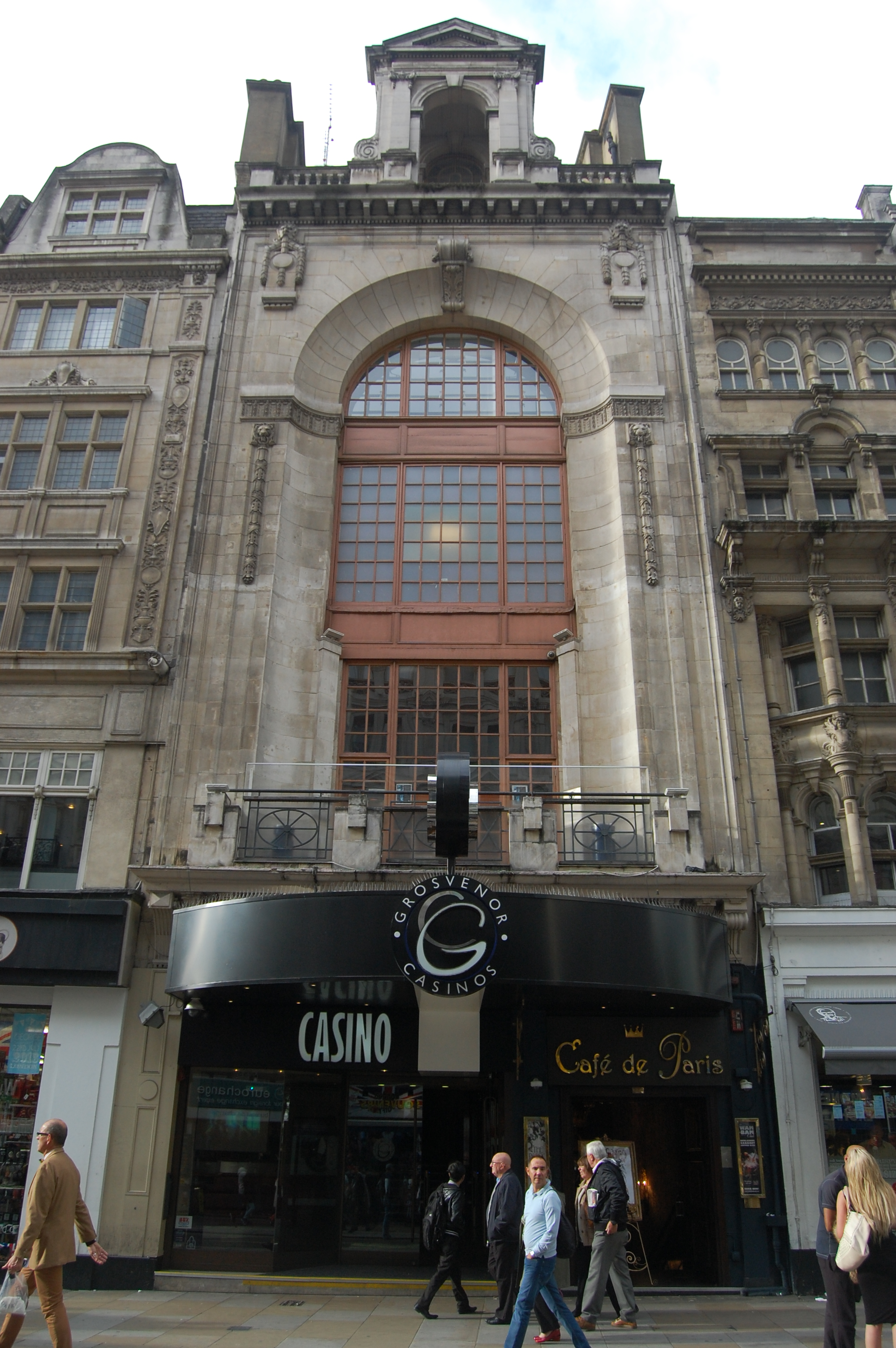
Café de Paris, London, where Steele made early live appearances

Whilst working as a merchant seaman, Steele learned to play guitar and began performing country and calypso music, inspired most by Hank Williams. He has claimed that when a ship he was serving on docked in Norfolk, Virginia, U.S., he saw Buddy Holly perform and fell in love with rock and roll. The story conflicts with the known performances of Holly, making it appear impossible that it could have occurred as described.

On shore leave in summer 1956, Steele met writer Lionel Bart and actor Mike Pratt at a Soho party. The trio began writing together and formed a loose band, the Cavemen. Usually with the Cavemen, Steele began playing in Soho bars, including "Blue Suede Shoes" and "Heartbreak Hotel" alongside country songs in his set. A performance backed by members of the Vipers Skiffle Group at the 2i's Coffee Bar was seen by John Kennedy, a photographer and publicity man who, within two weeks, got Steele a deal with Decca. With impresario Larry Parnes, Kennedy arranged a publicity stunt in which Steele performed at a staged debutante ball, getting the singer his first national press in The People under the headline "Rock 'n' roll has got the debs too!". Within weeks, Steele was headlining variety bills.

Steele's first single, "Rock with the Caveman", was one of the first British rock and roll hits, reaching number 13 on the UK Singles Chart in November 1956. He promoted the single with his first television appearance, on bandleader Jack Payne's BBC series Off the Record, and quickly became a national teen idol. (Note: Steele later commented "'Rock with the Caveman' must have nearly killed [Payne] as he'd never heard that type of music before.") Steele's success saw him dubbed "Britain's Elvis", though his appeal has been characterised as less provocative than Presley's.

A 1957 concert review by Trevor Philpott of Picture Post described Steele's act as possessing "not a trace of sex, real or implied", whilst Stephen Glynn has written that Steele's voice "was genial before threatening, his stage demeanour more playground skip than bedroom thrust". Steele's live performances were marked by frenzy from the teenage audience. In April 1957 Variety reviewed a concert and wrote "Blond kid with tousled, flapping hair has infectious toothy grin and natural style that endears him to mums and dads as well as to the juves and moppets."

His first album, Tommy Steele Stage Show, was recorded at a London concert the night before his twentieth birthday and issued in March 1957.

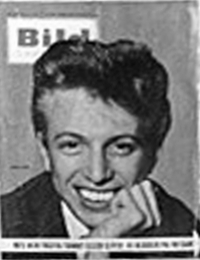
Steele on the cover of Bildjournalen

"Doomsday Rock", Steele's second single, failed to chart after its apocalyptic theme drew controversy. His third, "Singing the Blues", reached number 1 in January 1957, staving off a recording by Guy Mitchell for one week. Steele was among the first British pop stars to be heavily merchandised, with tie-in sweaters, shoes and toy guitars. Only a few months after his first chart presence, the singer was filming his life story; The Tommy Steele Story (1957) featured twelve new songs, written hastily by Steele, Bart and Pratt, that expanded the singer's repertoire to incorporate ballads and calypso music. The film's soundtrack was the first UK number one album by a British act, and the hit single "A Handful of Songs" received the 1958 Ivor Novello Award for Most Outstanding Song of the Year, Musically and Lyrically. By the end of 1957, Steele had bought a four-bedroom house in South London for his parents and was reported to be earning more than British Prime Minister Harold Macmillan.

Steele made several appearances on the BBC programme Six-Five Special (1957–58). However, agent Ian Bevan restricted the singer's bookings in the belief that television "tends to cheapen an artist of that nature". He performed at the Royal Albert Hall as part of the BBC's Third Annual Festival of Dance Music in April 1957 and topped the bill at the Royal Variety Performance at the London Palladium in November 1957. In 2008, theatre producer Bill Kenwright alleged that Elvis Presley was taken on a tour of London by Steele in 1958, challenging Glasgow Prestwick Airport's accepted status as the only place in the United Kingdom where Presley set foot. The unverified claim caused controversy, with Steele telling the media "I swore never to divulge what took place and I regret that it has found some way of 'getting into the light'. I can only hope he [Elvis] can forgive me."

Steele starred in a dual role in his second film vehicle, The Duke Wore Jeans, released in March 1958. The film's soundtrack topped the UK Albums Chart. In August 1957 it was announced Hollywood studios Warner Bros and MGM were interested in Steele.

In May 1958, Steele was hospitalised after being mobbed by fans at a concert at Caird Hall, Dundee, having had his right arm hurt, chunks of his hair pulled out, and his shirt ripped off. Steele subsequently largely withdrew from performing concerts and increasingly worked in the theatre. He continued to record rock and roll over 1958 and 1959, finding chart success with covers of US hits, including "Come On, Let's Go" and "Tallahassee Lassie". In September 1958, he appeared in the first episode of Oh Boy!, Jack Good's ITV series which featured several new British rock and roll stars, including Cliff Richard and Marty Wilde.

In August 1959, Steele undertook a three-day concert visit to Moscow, where The Tommy Steele Story was screened at the Kremlin. In his first colour film, Tommy the Toreador (1959), Steele proved "a real, true Danny Kaye", according to its cinematographer Gilbert Taylor. A hit single from the film, "Little White Bull", became a children's favourite after it was released in aid of a cancer research unit for children.

Considered Britain's first rock and roll star, Steele has been described by AllMusic as "the English teenager who let the genie out of the bottle, even if he wasn't the genie." Steele's rock and roll recordings have often divided critical opinion. In Yeah Yeah Yeah: The Story of Modern Pop (2013), Bob Stanley describes Steele's early singles as "charming and naïve, endearingly amateurish, with odd smudges of echo and strangely slurred vocals". In his 1970 book Revolt into Style: The Pop Arts in Britain, George Melly derided Steele’s films as being emblematic of the "castration of early rock and roll". In 2009, the greatest hits collection The Very Best of Tommy Steele reached the Top 40 in the UK Albums Chart, the first UK chart entry for Steele in over 46 years.

=== Actor ===
The increase in home-grown musical talent during the 1950s and 1960s allowed Steele to progress to a career in stage and film musicals, leaving behind his pop-idol identity. In 1957, he was voted the seventh-most-popular actor at the British box office.

In 1960, a tour of Australia had not been particularly successful, and upon his return to England he received two offers, one to star in the play Billy Liar, the other to join the Old Vic Company. He chose the latter. In 1960 it was announced he would star in King of the Castle produced by Raymond Stross, but the film appears not to have been made.

In the West End, Steele appeared in She Stoops to Conquer, and played the title role of Hans Christian Andersen. On film, he recreated his London and Broadway stage role in Half a Sixpence and starred in The Happiest Millionaire and Finian's Rainbow. In this last film, he played Og, the leprechaun turning human and co-starred with Petula Clark and Fred Astaire. In 1968, British exhibitors voted him the fourth most popular star at the local box office. The following year, he starred with Stanley Baker in the period drama Where's Jack?

In April 1971, Steele starred in his own show, Meet Me in London, originating in Las Vegas before a limited run at London's Adelphi Theatre. The London production was troubled when Steele demanded cuts to the first act on opening night. Singer Clodagh Rodgers refused to accommodate the cuts, and walked out fifteen minutes before the first night curtain. She was eventually replaced by Susan Maughan.

In 1978, Steele performed in a TV movie version of Gilbert and Sullivan's The Yeomen of the Guard (misspelt as "The Yeoman..."), singing the role of the hapless jester Jack Point.

In 1983, Steele directed and starred in the West End stage production of Singin' in the Rain at the London Palladium. In 1991, he toured with Some Like It Hot, the stage version of the Billy Wilder film. In 2003, after a decade-long hiatus, save for his one-man shows An Evening With Tommy Steele and What A Show!, he toured as Ebenezer Scrooge in a production of Scrooge: The Musical, an adaptation of Scrooge. Following this return, he reprised his role at the Palace Theatre, Manchester, over Christmas 2004 and brought the production to the London Palladium for Christmas 2005, which toured over the next ten years. In 2008, at the age of 71, Steele toured in the lead role of the stage musical Doctor Dolittle.

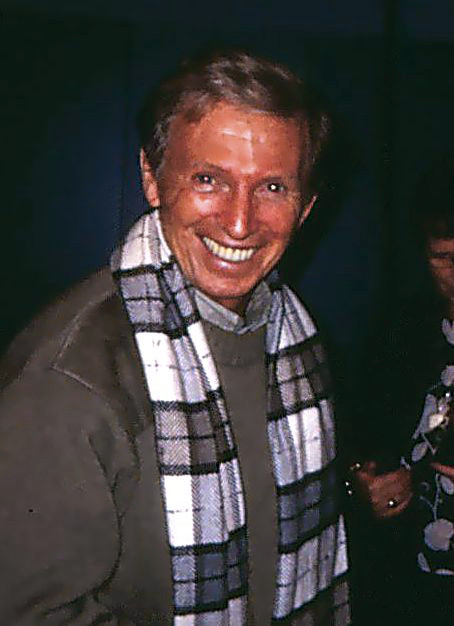
Tommy Steele, November 1999

In 2015, Steele began touring as Glenn Miller in a new stage production of The Glenn Miller Story (1954), which enjoyed two UK tours before heading for a summer season at the London Coliseum.

Steele was the subject of This Is Your Life in 1958 when he was surprised by Eamonn Andrews at the BBC Television Theatre. In December 2019, he hosted a "Magic of the Musicals" event at the British Film Institute, where he narrated and spoke about some of his favourite musical theatre film routines.

=== Sculptor ===
Steele is a respected sculptor and four of his major works have been on public display. Bermondsey Boy, at Rotherhithe Town Hall in London, was stolen in 1998: its whereabouts are unknown. Eleanor Rigby, which he sculpted and donated to the City of Liverpool as a tribute to the Beatles, stands in Stanley Street, Liverpool, not far from the Cavern Club. Union, featuring two rugby players, is on display at Twickenham Stadium. Trinity, designed during the regeneration of the docklands area in Bermondsey, stood outside the Trinity building in Bermondsey. When Steele lived in Montrose House, Petersham, Surrey, his life-sized sculpture of Charlie Chaplin as "The Tramp" stood outside his front door. He is also an artist of some note and has exhibited at the Royal Academy.

=== Writing career ===
In 1981, Steele wrote and published a novel titled The Final Run about World War II and the evacuation of Dunkirk.

Steele also wrote a children's novel, entitled Quincy, about a rejected toy trying to save himself and his fellow rejects in the basement of a toy store from the furnace the day after Christmas. Released in 1981, it was based on his own television film, Quincy's Quest, from 1979, in which Steele played Quincy, and Mel Martin played Quincy's girlfriend doll, Rebecca.

Steele co-wrote many of his early songs with Lionel Bart and Mike Pratt, but he used the pseudonym of Jimmy Bennett, using his mother's maiden name, from 1958 onwards.

On 7 November 2019, Steele was awarded a Lifetime Achievement Award by the British Music Hall Society at a celebratory luncheon in Mayfair's Lansdowne Club. Those paying tribute to his then 63 years and two days in show business included Tim Rice, Wyn Calvin and Bill Kenwright.

In May 2020, Steele announced a new project which he had been working on titled Breakheart, which was available exclusively online throughout May. Announced via a specially recorded video during the COVID-19 lockdown, Breakheart was a seven-episode audio thriller, written by Steele and set during the Second World War. A new episode was released each day for a week, culminating in the full story. Following the re-release of the complete version of Breakheart for the 2020 festive period, Steele also released a specially recorded festive tale, The Christmas Mystery of Muchhope. This story was re-released for the festive period of 2022 with new edits and sound effects, and a new story, 'The Magic of Christmas,' was written and recorded by Steele for a limited release for Christmas 2023.

In June 2021, to celebrate his 65 years in the entertainment industry, his authorised biography, A Life in the Spotlight, was published by FontHill Media, written by fan and archivist Sebastian Lassandro.

== Personal life ==
Steele and Winifred Ann Donoghue or Donoughue (born 1936) married at St Patrick's Catholic Church, Soho Square, London, in spring 1960. The couple has one daughter.

== Honours ==
In the 1979 New Year Honours, Steele was appointed an Officer of the Order of the British Empire (OBE) for his work as an entertainer and actor.

In 2019, Steele was awarded the Freedom of the City of London. Due to the COVID-19 pandemic, the ceremony at Mansion House was delayed until 20 July 2021.

He was knighted in the 2020 Birthday Honours for services to entertainment and charity.

== Legacy ==
Steele's teen idol stardom was the subject of several contemporary parodies. On his album The Best of Sellers (1958), Peter Sellers portrays Cockney rock and roll star named "Mr. Iron" in the sketch "The Trumpet Volunteer". Steele's rise to fame was satirised in the 1958 West End musical Expresso Bongo and its 1959 film adaptation starring Cliff Richard.

There is a London Borough of Southwark blue plaque on Nickleby House, in the Dickens Estate in Bermondsey, commemorating Steele.

== Filmography ==
- Kill Me Tomorrow (1957)
- The Tommy Steele Story (1957)
- The Duke Wore Jeans (1958)
- Tommy the Toreador (1959)
- Light Up the Sky! (US: Skywatch, 1960)
- It's All Happening (US: The Dream Maker, 1963)
- The Happiest Millionaire (1967)
- Half a Sixpence (1967)
- Finian's Rainbow (1968)
- Where's Jack? (1969)
- Twelfth Night (TV, 1970)
- Tommy Steele in Search of Charlie Chaplin (TV, 1971)
- The Yeomen of the Guard (TV, 1978)
- Quincy's Quest (TV, 1979)

== Sources ==
- Best, Betty (21 December 1960). "Tommy stoops to conquer". The Australian Women's Weekly. p. 76.
- "Tommy Steele Marries Anne Donague". British Pathé.

Video Newsreel of Tommy Steele's Wedding

- Cavanagh, Terry (1996). Public Sculpture of Liverpool. Public Sculpture of Britain. Liverpool UP. ISBN 978-0853237112.
- Cavanagh, Terry (2007). Public Sculpture of South London. Public Sculpture of Britain. Chicago UP. ISBN 978-1846310751.
- Cleland, Gary (23 April 2008). "Did Elvis Presley visit Tommy Steele in London?". Daily Telegraph. Archived from the original on 26 April 2008.
- "O.B.E." London Gazette. Vol. Supplement 47723. 29 December 1978. p. 12.
- "Tommy Steele". Official Charts. 2009. Archived from the original on 3 April 2015.
- Roberts, David (2006). British Hit Singles & Albums (19th ed.). Guinness World Records. p. 527. ISBN 978-1904994107.
- Steele, Tommy (1983). The Final Run. HarperCollins. ISBN 978-0002227094.
- Steele, Tommy (1983b). Quincy. Macmillan. ISBN 978-0330281263.
- Steele, Tommy (2006). Bermondsey Boy: Memories of a Forgotten World. Michael Joseph. ISBN 978-0718149727.
- Beacon, Brian (28 August 2015). "Britain's first pop star Tommy Steele on six decades in showbiz". The Herald. Archived from the original on 27 October 2016.
- "Rock on Tommy". The Scotsman. 10 September 2006. Archived from the original on 28 January 2018.
- Tobler, John (1992). NME Rock 'N' Roll Years. Hamlyn. ISBN 978-0600576020.
- "Tommy Steele Biography". Tommy Steele International Fan Club. Archived from the original on 5 September 2008.
- "Tommy Steele Discography". Tommy Steele International Fan Club. Archived from the original on 29 September 2007.
