= Mike Pratt (actor) =

English actor, musician, songwriter and screenwriter (1931–1976)

- Pratt in Randall and Hopkirk (Deceased)
- Born: Michael John Pratt; 7 June 1931; London, England
- Died: 10 July 1976 (aged 45); Midhurst, West Sussex, England
- Occupations: Actor; songwriter; screenwriter
- Known for: Randall and Hopkirk (Deceased)
- Children: 2, including Guy Pratt

Michael John Pratt (7 June 1931 – 10 July 1976) was an English actor, musician, songwriter and screenwriter. He was known for his work on British television in the 1960s and 1970s, which included co-starring as Randall in Randall and Hopkirk (Deceased).

== Early life and musical career ==
Early in his career, Mike Pratt worked in advertising, while also taking some part-time acting roles. He left his office job in the mid-1950s. With three friends (including Lionel Bart), he then drove around Europe in an old-style London taxi.

Upon returning to England, he earned a living as a jazz and skiffle musician in London clubs. An accomplished guitarist and pianist, in the 1950s, he jammed with the Vipers Skiffle Group at the 2 I's club in London with his friend Tommy Steele.

A successful songwriter, Pratt collaborated with Bart and Steele on many of Steele's early hits in the late 1950s and early 1960s. To enable Steele to start to film his life story, co-writers Steele, Bart and Pratt, wrote twelve songs in seven days. A Steele-Pratt collaboration, "A Handful of Songs", originally a hit for Tommy Steele in 1957, became the theme tune to a long-running Granada Television children's programme of the same name in the late 1970s. They also contributed to the writing of the song "Rock with the Caveman".

Bart and Pratt won the Ivor Novello award for "A Handful of Songs" in 1958, and were nominated in 1959 for 'The Years Outstanding Novelty Item' for "Little White Bull". In 1961, he wrote the music and lyrics for The Big Client, a play which was produced at the Bristol Old Vic from 28 November 1961. Pratt also co wrote the title song to the 1961 film comedy Double Bunk.

== Acting career ==
Pratt appeared in numerous plays between 1965 and 1967. From 25 May 1966, he appeared at the Aldwych Theatre in Tango, a play by Slawomir Mrozek, alongside Patience Collier, Peter Jeffrey, Ursula Mohan and Dudley Sutton, under director Trevor Nunn.

He is best known for his role as Jeff Randall in the late 1960s ITC detective series Randall and Hopkirk (Deceased) alongside Kenneth Cope and Annette Andre. Pratt also wrote episode two of the series, titled "A Disturbing Case".

He also appeared in TV series such as No Hiding Place, The Saint, Gideon's Way, Z-Cars, Danger Man, Out of the Unknown, (in the 'episode, ' Time in Advance '), Redcap, The Baron, Man in a Suitcase, The Champions, Callan, UFO (episode "The Psychobombs"), The Expert, Hadleigh, Jason King, Arthur of the Britons, Softly, Softly: Task Force, Crown Court, Father Brown, Oil Strike North and The Adventures of Black Beauty, in which he had a semi-regular role. His last television role was in the BBC drama series The Brothers as airline pilot Don Stacy.

His film career included roles in This Is My Street (1964), The Party's Over (1965), Roman Polanski's Repulsion (1965), Robbery (1967), A Dandy in Aspic (1968), The Fixer (1968), Goodbye Gemini (1970), Sitting Target (1972), Assassin (1973), the horror anthology The Vault of Horror (1973), and Swallows and Amazons (1974).

He joined the Royal Shakespeare Company in 1966, appearing on stage throughout the rest of the 1960s and the early 1970s.

== Personal life and death ==
His son is Guy Pratt, a session bass guitarist best known for his live performances with Pink Floyd (since 1987) and offshoot solo projects with David Gilmour and as a member of the band Nick Mason's Saucerful of Secrets.He first came to prominence in the band Icehouse.

Mike Pratt died from lung cancer July 10th 1976, aged 45. The following month, a show was staged at the Aldwych Theatre in London in his memory. The cast included Glenda Jackson, Kenneth Haigh and John Le Mesurier. Of his co-star in Randall & Hopkirk (Deceased), Kenneth Cope said:

"Michael was a great loss, both to the industry and as a friend."

== Filmography ==
Year	Title	Role	Notes
1963	Impact	Police Inspector	
1964	This Is My Street	Sid Graham	
1965	The Party's Over	Geronimo	
1965	Repulsion	Workman	
1967	Robbery	Bob	Uncredited
1968	A Dandy in Aspic	Greff	
1968	The Fixer	Father Anastasy	
1970	Goodbye Gemini	Rod Barstowe	
1972	Sitting Target	Prison Warder Accomplice	
1973	The Vault of Horror	Clive	(segment "Midnight Mess")
1973	Assassin	Matthew	
1974	Swallows and Amazons	Mr. Dixon	
1974	Invasion: UFO		Film edited from episodes of UK TV series UFO

== Television ==
Year	Title	Role	Notes
1962	Out of This World	Mac	Episode: "Dumb Martian"
1962-1972	Armchair Theatre	Mac/Stanley	2 episodes
1963	BBC Sunday-Night Play	Sid Robinson	Episode: "I'm Not Stopping"
1964	ITV Play of the Week	Various	3 episodes
1964	No Hiding Place	Archie Raines	Episode: "Red Roses for Emma"
1964	Armchair Mystery Theatre	Dietrick	Episode: "The Last Coach"
1964	Edgar Wallace Mysteries	Harry	Episode: "Face of a Stranger"
1964	Redcap	Sergeant Bailey	Episode: "Epitah for a Sweat"
1964-1966	Gideon's Way	Various	3 episodes
1964-1967	The Saint	Alex Morgan/Jeff Peterson	2 episodes
1965	Comedy Playhouse		Episode: "Here I Come Whoever I Am"
1965	R3	Croxley	Episode: "It's Better to Know"
1965	Out of the Unknown	Otto Henck	Episode: "Time in Advance"
1965	Z-Cars	Johnny Carson	Episode: "Contrary to Regulations"
1965	Danger Man	Various	4 episodes
1965-1966	The Man in Room 17	Lt. Manuel Rafael Achara/Jack Simpson	2 episodes
1965-1967	Theatre 625	Various	4 episodes
1966	Thirty-Minute Theatre	Arthur	Episode: "Brothers"
1966	The Baron	Sheldon	Episode: "There's Someone Close Behind You"
1967	Man in a Suitcase	Detective Sergeant Peters	Episode: "Variation on a Million Bucks Part One"
1967	Omnibus	The Man (Dusky Ruth)	Episode: "The World of Coppard"
1968	The Champions	Raven	Episode: "Twelve Hours"
1969-1970	Randall and Hopkirk (Deceased)	Jeff Randall	
1970	UFO	Mason	Episode: "The Psychobombs"
1971	The Expert	Brian Rowlinson	Episode: "Where are You Going?"
1971	Hadleigh	Brian Alwyn	Episode: "Ring of Fire"
1971	Jason King	Carson	Episode: "A Red Rose Forever"
1972	Owen, M.D.	Joe Blayden	Episode: "Ancient Enemy"
1972	Callan	Medov	Episode: "Rules of the Game"
1972	Spyder's Web	President Baras	Episode: "An Almost Modern Man"
1972	Pathfinders	Dr. Malcolm Woolley	Episode: "Codname - Gomorrah"
1973	Arthur of the Britons	Mordant	Episode: "People of the Plough"
1973	Crown Court	Richard Frost	Serial: "No Smoke Without Fire"
1973	Softly, Softly: Task Force	Johnny Drew	Episode: "Cover"
1973	The Adventures of Black Beauty	Simey	4 episodes
1974	Father Brown	Col. Hector Merton	Episode: "The Arrow of Heaven"
1975	Oil Strike North	Jack Johnson	Episode: "First Lion"
1975-1976	The Brothers	Don Stacey	14 episodes
