= Esquire Theatre =

Esquire Theatre most commonly refers to:

- Esquire Theatre (Denver)
- Esquire Theater (Cape Girardeau, Missouri)
- Esquire Theatre (Cincinnati)

Esquire Theatre might also refer to:

== Places ==
- Canter's (Was Esquire Theatre before being renovated into a deli)
- Esquire Show Bar
