= Hound Dog (song) =

1952 song written by Jerry Leiber and Mike Stoller

Single by Big Mama Thornton
- B-side: "Night Mare"
- Released: February 1953
- Recorded: August 13, 1952
- Studio: Radio Recorders Annex, Los Angeles
- Genre: Blues
- Length: 2:52
- Label: Peacock
- Songwriter: Jerry Leiber and Mike Stoller
- Producer: Johnny Otis

Big Mama Thornton singles chronology
"Everytime I Think of You" (1952)	"Hound Dog" (1953)	"Cotton Pickin' Blues" (1953)

Official audio
- "Hound Dog" on YouTube

"Hound Dog" is a twelve-bar blues song written by Jerry Leiber and Mike Stoller. Recorded originally by Big Mama Thornton on August 13, 1952, in Los Angeles and released by Peacock Records in late February 1953, "Hound Dog" was Thornton's only hit record, selling over 500,000 copies, spending 14 weeks in the R&B charts, including seven weeks at number one. Thornton's recording of "Hound Dog" is listed as one of the Rock and Roll Hall of Fame's "500 Songs That Shaped Rock and Roll", ranked at 318 in the 2021 iteration of Rolling Stone's 500 Greatest Songs of All Time and was inducted into the Grammy Hall of Fame in February 2013.

"Hound Dog" has been recorded more than 250 times. The best-known version is the July 1956 recording by Elvis Presley, which ranked number 19 on Rolling Stone's list of the 500 Greatest Songs of All Time in 2004, but was excluded from the revised list in 2021 in favor of Thornton's version; it is also one of the best-selling singles of all time. Presley's version, which sold about 10 million copies globally, was his best-selling song and "an emblem of the rock 'n' roll revolution". It was simultaneously number one on the US pop, country, and R&B charts in 1956, and it topped the pop chart for 11 weeks—a record that stood for 36 years. Presley's 1956 RCA recording was inducted into the Grammy Hall of Fame in 1988, and it is listed as one of the Rock and Roll Hall of Fame's "500 Songs That Shaped Rock and Roll".

"Hound Dog" has been at the center of controversies and several lawsuits, including disputes over authorship, royalties, and copyright infringement by the many answer songs released by such artists as Rufus Thomas and Roy Brown. From the 1970s onward, the song has been featured in numerous films.

== Background and composition ==
On August 12, 1952, R&B bandleader Johnny Otis asked 19-year-old songwriters Jerry Leiber and Mike Stoller to his home to meet blues singer Willie Mae "Big Mama" Thornton. Thornton had been signed by "Diamond" Don Robey's Houston-based Peacock Records the year before and, after two failed singles, Robey had enlisted Otis to reverse her fortunes. After hearing Thornton rehearse several songs, Leiber and Stoller "forged a tune to suit her personality—brusque and badass". In an interview in Rolling Stone in April 1990, Stoller said: "She was a wonderful blues singer, with a great moaning style. But it was as much her appearance as her blues style that influenced the writing of 'Hound Dog' and the idea that we wanted her to growl it." Leiber recalled: "We saw Big Mama and she knocked me cold. She looked like the biggest, baddest, saltiest chick you would ever see. And she was mean, a 'lady bear,' as they used to call 'em. She must have been 350 pounds, and she had all these scars all over her face", conveying words which could not be sung. "But how to do it without actually saying it? And how to do it telling a story? I couldn't just have a song full of expletives." In 1999, Leiber said, "I was trying to get something like the Furry Lewis phrase 'Dirty Mother Furya'. I was looking for something closer to that but I couldn't find it, because everything I went for was too coarse and would not have been playable on the air." Using a "black slang expression referring to a man who sought a woman to take care of him". the song's opening line, "You ain't nothin' but a hound dog", was a euphemism, said Leiber. The song, a Southern blues lament, is "the tale of a woman throwing a gigolo out of her house and her life":

You ain't nothin' but a hound dog
Quit snoopin' 'round my door
You can wag your tail
But I ain't gonna feed you no more

The song was written for a woman to sing in which she berates "her selfish, exploitative man", and in it she "expresses a woman's rejection of a man – the metaphorical dog in the title". According to Iain Thomas, "'Hound Dog' embodies the Thornton persona she had crafted as a comedienne prior to entering the music business" by parading "the classic puns, extended metaphors, and sexual double entendres so popular with the bawdy genre." R&B expert George A. Moonoogian concurs, calling it "a biting and scathing satire in the double-entendre genre" of 1950s rhythm and blues.

Leiber and Stoller wrote the song "Hound Dog" in 12 to 15 minutes, with Leiber scribbling the lyrics in pencil on ordinary paper and without musical notation in the car on the way to Stoller's apartment. Said Leiber, "'Hound Dog' took like twelve minutes. That's not a complicated piece of work. But the rhyme scheme was difficult. Also the metric structure of the music was not easy." According to Leiber, as soon as they reached the parking lot and Stoller's 1937 Plymouth, "I was beating out a rhythm we called the 'buck dance' on the roof of the car. We got to Johnny Otis's house and Mike went right to the piano … didn't even bother to sit down. He had a cigarette in his mouth that was burning his left eye, and he started to play the song."

== Big Mama Thornton's version (1952/53) ==
Thornton's recording of "Hound Dog" is credited with "helping to spur the evolution of black R&B into rock music". Brandeis University professor Stephen J. Whitfield, in his 2001 book In Search of American Jewish Culture, regards "Hound Dog" as a marker of "the success of race-mixing in music a year before the desegregation of public schools was mandated" in Brown v. Board of Education. Leiber regarded the original recording by the 350-pound "blues belter" Big Mama Thornton as his favorite version, while Stoller said, "If I had to name my favorite recordings, I'd say they are Big Mama Thornton's 'Hound Dog' and Peggy Lee's 'Is That All There Is?'"

In 1992, Leiber and Stoller recalled that during the rehearsal, Thornton sang the song as a ballad. Leiber said that this was not the way they planned and sang it for her, with Stoller on piano, as an example of the concept. Thornton agreed to try their recommendation. According to Maureen Mahon, a music professor at New York University, Thornton's version is "an important [part of the] beginning of rock-and-roll, especially in its use of the guitar as the key instrument".

=== Recording ===
Thornton recorded "Hound Dog" at Radio Recorders Annex in Los Angeles on August 13, 1952, the day after its composition. It subsequently became her biggest hit. According to Hound Dog: The Leiber and Stoller Autobiography, Thornton's "Hound Dog" was the first record that Leiber and Stoller produced themselves, taking over from bandleader Johnny Otis. Said Stoller:

We were worried because the drummer wasn't getting the feel that Johnny had created in rehearsal. "Johnny," Jerry said, "can't you play drums on the record? No one can nail that groove like you." "Who's gonna run the session?" he asked. Silence. "You two?" he asked. "The kids are gonna run a recording session?" "Sure," I said. "The kids wrote it. Let the kids do it." Johnny smiled and said, 'Why not?'"

Otis played drums on the recording, replacing Ledard "Kansas City" Bell. As Otis was still signed exclusively to Federal Records, a subsidiary of Syd Nathan's King Records as "Kansas City Bill" or perhaps with Mercury Records at this time, Otis used the pseudonym "Kansas City Bill" (after his drummer "Kansas City" Bell) on this record. Therefore, Otis, Louisiana blues guitarist Pete "Guitar" Lewis, and Puerto Rican bass player Mario Delagarde (some sources say erroneously it was Albert Winston) are listed as "Kansas City Bill & Orchestra" on the Peacock record labels.

During the rehearsal, Leiber objected to Thornton's vocal approach, as she was crooning the lyrics rather than belting them out. Although intimidated by her size and facial scarring, Leiber protested, to which Thornton responded with an icy glare and told him, "'White boy, don't you be tellin' me how to sing the blues.'" After this exchange, Leiber sang the song himself to demonstrate how they wanted it done. After that, according to Stoller's later recollection, Thornton understood the bawdy style they were looking for.

Speaking to music writer Ralph J. Gleason, Thornton recalled that she added a few interjections of her own, played around with the rhythm (some of the choruses have thirteen rather than twelve bars), and had the band bark and howl like hound dogs at the end of the song: "I started to sing the words and join in some of my own. All that talkin' and hollerin'—that's my own." Thornton interacts constantly in a call and response fashion during a one-minute long guitar "solo" by Lewis. These verbal interjections, sometimes called "blues talk", are common in blues music. Years later Thornton helped launch a controversy over "Hound Dog", claiming to have written it. When questioned further on the matter, Thornton explained that, while the song had been composed by Leiber and Stoller, she had transformed it: "They gave me the words, but I changed it around and did it my way". In his book Race, Rock, and Elvis, Michael T. Bertrand says that Thornton's explanation "ingenuously stresses artist interpretation as the sole yardstick with which to measure authenticity".

Thornton recorded two takes of the song, and the second take was released. Habanera and mambo elements can be found in this recording. Puerto Rican bass player Mario Delagarde is credited with adding "a jazz-based rhythm". Influenced by African-American musical cultures, its "sounds range from the gravelly beginning of several phrases, to her spoken and howled interpolations, and the ending with dog sounds from the band." According to musicologist Robert Fink, Thornton's delivery has flexible phrasing making use of micro-inflections and syncopations. Each has a focal accent which is never repeated. According to Maureen Mahon:

Thornton's "Hound Dog" differed from most of the rhythm and blues records of the era in its spare arrangement. There are none of the honking saxophone solos or pounding piano flourishes that marked the R&B sound. Instead, supported by guitar, bass and drums, her resonant vocals dominate the foreground, conveying her haughty relief at being through with a trifling man. Thornton maintains a confident attitude, bringing the blues tradition of outspoken women into the R&B context and helping to set the style for rock and roll by putting sexuality and play with gender expectations in the foreground.

On September 9, 1952, the copyright application for "Hound Dog" was lodged. On the application the words and music are attributed to Thornton and recording executive Don Robey, with the copyright claimants listed as: "Murphy L. Robey (W) & Willie Mae Thornton (A)." It was renewed subsequently on May 13, 1980, with the same details.

=== Release and reception ===
In late February 1953, "Hound Dog" was released by Peacock (Peacock 1612), with the song credited erroneously on the label to Leiber-Stroller [sic]-Otis. Thornton recalled later that she learned her record was in circulation while she was on her way to a performance with the Johnny Otis Orchestra during this tour in Dayton, Ohio. "I was going to the theater and I just turned the radio on in the car and the man said, 'Here's a record that's going nationwide: 'Hound Dog' by Willie Mae Thornton.' I said, 'That's me!' [laughs] I hadn't heard the record in so long. So when we get to the theater they was blasting it. You could hear it from the theater, from the loudspeaker. They were just playing 'Hound Dog' all over the theater. So I goes up in the operating room, I say, 'Do you mind playing that again?' 'Cause I hadn't heard the record in so long I forgot the words myself. So I stood there while he was playing it, listening to it. So that evening I sang it on the show, and everybody went for it. 'Hound Dog' just took off like a jet."

On March 7, 1953, "Hound Dog" was advertised in Billboard, and reviewed positively on March 14, 1953, as a new record to watch, described as "a wild and exciting rhumba blues" with "infectious backing that rocks all the way". According to Johnny Ace biographer James M. Salem, "The rawness of the sound combined with the overt sexuality of the lyric made 'Hound Dog' an immediate smash hit in urban black America from late March to the middle of July 1953." "Hound Dog" took off immediately and looked like a national hit record. Rufus Thomas quickly recorded an answer song called "Bear Cat" on Sun 181. Thornton's record was such a big seller that Peacock Records had three new pressing plants running full-time to try and keep up with demand. Debuting in the charts on March 28, 1953, it spent fourteen weeks on the Billboard Rhythm and Blues charts, seven of them at number one. By April 30, 1953, Cash Box magazine listed the song as "the nation's top-selling blues record", and it topped the charts in New York, Chicago, New Orleans, San Francisco, Newark, Memphis, Dallas, Cincinnati, St. Louis, and Los Angeles. "By mid summer, it is obvious that "Hound Dog" will be the biggest seller in the history of Peacock Records." The song was named as the Best Rhythm and Blues song of 1953 by Cash Box magazine, and was ranked number three on Billboard's Best Selling Rhythm & Blues Chart for 1953.

Don Robey estimated that Thornton's version of "Hound Dog" sold between 500,000 and 750,000 copies, and would have sold more had its sales not been diluted by an abundance of cover versions and "answer songs". The success of "Hound Dog" secured Peacock Record's place as a major independent label. However, despite its success, neither the composers nor artist were compensated well for their efforts. According to Stoller, "Big Mama's 'Hound Dog' went to number one, sold a million copies, and did nothing for our bank statements. We were getting screwed." After suing Robey, "We were given an advance check for $1,200," said Stoller, "but the check bounced." As a result, Leiber and Stoller started their own label, Spark Records, and publishing company, Quintet Music. Those ventures were successful, but Leiber and Stoller would only earn substantial royalties from "Hound Dog" when it was covered by Elvis Presley (RCA 6604) in July 1956. Similarly, Thornton stated: "That song sold over two million records. I got one check for $500 and never saw another." In 1984, she told Rolling Stone, "Didn't get no money from them at all. Everybody livin' in a house but me. I'm just livin."

=== Re-releases ===
By July 1956, "the rock 'n roll age was upon the world, and as the new sensation Elvis Presley recorded "Hound Dog" to international acclaim, Peacock re-released Thornton's original" by August 18, 1956, backing it with "Rock-a-Bye Baby" (Peacock 5–1612), but it failed to chart. In Australia and New Zealand, Prestige Records (founded in Auckland by 17 year-old Phil Warren and Bruce Henderson) released the same record on licence in 1956 (Prestige PSP-1004), but the composition is credited to Robey-Thornton-Leiber-Stoller. By early 1957, "Willie Mae Thornton is seen as one who is out of the rock / pop mainstream and so her affiliation with Peacock Records ends ... Thornton continues to make personal appearances and is always remembered for her original version of "Hound Dog" which gets a spate of airplay during the summer of 1958 which leads to another re-release of the original." On October 7, 1965, Thornton's live performance of "Hound Dog" with Eddie Boyd and Buddy Guy at American Folk Blues Festival '65 in Hamburg, Germany, was recorded and released subsequently by Fontana Records on an album American Folk Blues Festival '65 (Fontana 681 529 TL) with other artists.

=== Awards and Accolades ===
- In 1990, it was ranked No. 36 on Rolling Stone's "Fifty Essential Recordings from the Fifties" (1990)
- In February 2013, Thornton's recording of "Hound Dog" was inducted into Grammy Hall of Fame.
- Thornton's recording of "Hound Dog" is listed as one of the Rock and Roll Hall of Fame's "500 Songs That Shaped Rock and Roll" in April 2013.
- In 2017, Thornton's recording of "Hound Dog" was selected for preservation in the National Recording Registry by the Library of Congress as being "culturally, historically, or aesthetically significant".
- The original version was ranked No. 318 on the 2021 edition of "Top 500 Songs of All Time" by Rolling Stone Magazine.

=== Responses (1953–1955) ===
==== Cover versions ====
Thornton's "Hound Dog" was so popular that it spawned at least ten cover versions of the original before Elvis Presley recorded it in July 1956. One of the earliest covers of Thornton's original was that of Little Esther, who recorded an R&B cover on March 11, 1953 (b/w "Sweet Lips") on Federal Records (Federal 12126) that was released by April. While Federal's trade ads touted this release as the greatest record ever made by Little Esther, in its review on April 11, 1953, Billboard opined: "It fails to build the same excitement of the original."

Within a month of the release of Thornton's "Hound Dog", the following six country cover versions of the song—all credited erroneously to Leiber-Stoller (or Stroller [sic])-Otis—were released on several different labels by white artists:

- Jack Turner & his Granger County Gang (RCA 20–5267; 47–5267) (actually Henry D. Haynes on vocals, with his Homer and Jethro partner Kenneth C. Burns on mandolin, with Chet Atkins on lead guitar, Charles Green on bass, and Jerry Byrd on steel guitar), recorded a rockabilly boogie or hillbilly country-western version on March 20, 1953, in New York City. After the success of Patti Page's version of the Bob Merrill-penned "(How Much Is) That Doggie in the Window?", as Homer and Jethro they recorded a parody version, "(How Much Is) That Hound Dog in the Window" (RCA Victor 47–5280) in March that went to number two on the US Country charts, and number 17 on the Billboard national charts. Billboard noted: "By coincidence or intent, the use of 'hound dog' also recognizes the top r&b record of the moment." After Elvis Presley released his version of "Hound Dog" in 1956, by early November, Homer & Jethro released a parody version, "Houn' Dawg" (RCA Victor 6706).
- Billy Starr (Imperial 8186) This version is described as "a juke joint-honed blend of country and pre-rockabilly raunch".
- Eddie Hazelwood (Intro 6069) His version "two-steps in honky-tonk style."
- Former Hollywood child actress and 1946 National Yodeling champion Betsy Gay (Intro 6070) recorded a hillbilly version with Joe Maphis and Merle Travis at Radio Recorders studio in Los Angeles on March 18, 1953. Billboard described her recording: "She sings it well, shouting out the lyrics with occasional excitement, tho without the power the tune needs."
- Former Texas Playboy band Western swing vocalist Tommy Duncan and the Miller Bros. (Intro 6071) Duncan's version is described as "a smoother, jazzy reading featuring fine guitar and piano contributions".
- Cleve Jackson (Jackson Cleveland Toombs) & His Hound Dogs (Herald 6000),

On February 24, 1954, The Cozy Cole All Stars recorded an instrumental version, "Hound Dog Special" (MGM 11794), a "spend off [sic] of Willie Mae Thornton's" version.

Bass player Al Rex, who joined Bill Haley and His Comets in the fall of 1955, told of performing the song when given the spotlight at live performances. "I used to do 'Hound Dog.' Haley would get mad at me if I'd do that. This was even before Presley did it. Haley didn't like those guys from Philadelphia that wrote the song."

==== Answers and Parodies ====
By the end of 1953, at least six "answer songs" that responded to 'Big Mama' Thornton's original version of "Hound Dog" were released. According to Peacock's Don Robey, these songs were "bastardizations" of the original and reduced its sales potential.

===== "Bear Cat" (1953) =====
The first and most popular answer song to "Hound Dog" was "Bear Cat (The Answer To Hound Dog)" (Sun 101), recorded at Sun Studios at 706 Union Avenue, Memphis, Tennessee on March 8, 1953, just two weeks after Thornton's original version was released, and even before a review of "Hound Dog" had been published in Billboard. "Bear Cat" had new lyrics written by Sun Records founder Sam Phillips, in which he altered the gender of the singer, who bemoaned that his woman was a "bear cat", a Jazz Age slang term for "a hot-blooded or fiery girl". According to Phillips' biographer Peter Guralnick:

Sam was knocked out by Big Mama Thornton's "Hound Dog" the first time he heard it. Performed with ripsaw gusto by the singer ... and modified by a delicate Latin-flavored "rhumba-boogie" beat, the record struck a communal chord somewhere between low comedy and bedrock truth. It totally tickled Sam on both levels. "I said, my God, it's so true. You ain't nothing but a hound dog. You ain't met your responsibilities. You didn't go to work like you [should]." And it gave him an immediate idea for a follow-up – from the man's point of view ... "Bear Cat", "[i]n the time-honored tradition of answer songs, was a virtual carbon copy of "Hound Dog" with lyrics, chord progressions, and rhythmic structure all patterned directly on the original.

Looking for a suitable man to record this song, Phillips selected part-time local WDIA disk jockey Rufus Thomas, who adopted the nickname, "Rufus 'Hound Dog' Thomas" for this recording. "With his gruff Louis Armstrong-influenced voice, quick wit, and eye-popping antics, he was the perfect candidate to reply to the harsh accusations Big Mama Thornton had thrown out in her song, this time leveling them at a 'bossy woman'". Despite his reluctance to record the song and his reservations about the band assembled by Phillips, Thomas "threw himself into the song with the same brash charm that he brought to all his performances, complete with yowls, growls, and fervent imprecations". The record's spare electric guitar work by Memphis bluesman Joe Hill Louis was greatly influenced by that of Pete Lewis on the original. According to James M. Salem:

[I]nstead of barking and howling there is meowing and hissing in the background. In true answer form, the gender of the participants was reversed. This time the protagonist is male, directly challenging the worthless female of the original song—correcting her previous insults and re-directing them at her. "You know what you said about me woman?" says the man in open confrontation. "Well … You ain't nothin' but a bear cat, scratchin' at my door." All the irony and sarcasm of the original is captured in the answer, even the sexuality: "You can purr, pretty kitty, but I ain't gonna rub you no more."

While "the result was peppier than Big Mama's version, with a more straight-ahead beat ... [Phillips] was under no illusions about surpassing the original": "Hell, we didn't come close to being as good as Big Mama. She could have done that song a cappella and convinced me that, by God, you ain't nothing but a damned hound dog!" Thomas was dissatisfied with the result, especially Joe Hill Louis's country-style blues guitar playing. In 1978, Robert Palmer wrote: "Even today, Rufus takes perverse delight in pointing out the wrong notes in Louis's solo."

Within two weeks, "Bear Cat" (Sun 181) was in stores, prompting Billboard to describe it on March 28 as "the fastest answer song to hit the market". It became both Thomas' and Sun Records' first hit, More than 5,000 copies were ordered in the first days by distributors, and by mid-April it had charted nationally, eventually reaching number three on the R&B charts. However, as Phillips claimed a writing credit for the song, a copyright-infringement suit ensued that nearly bankrupted Phillips' record label.

===== Other Answer Records =====
In the months after the release of "Hound Dog" and "Bear Cat", a spate of answer records followed:

- On March 18, Blues shouter Roy Brown recorded "Mr. Hound Dog's in Town" for King Records (45–4627). While it had the same melody and many of the same lyrics as the original, Brown is credited as the sole writer. Despite the threat of legal action, Brown's "Mr. Hound Dog's in Town" was still being advertised in Billboard on June 6, 1953.
- Vocalist Charlie Gore and guitarist Louis Innis recorded "(You Ain't Nothin' But a Female) Hound Dog" (King 45–1212) for King Records on March 22. This song was credited to Innis, Lois Mann (a pseudonym of King Records owner Syd Nathan, the latter his wife's maiden name), and Johnny Otis.
- At the request of Leonard Chess, Blues guitarist John Brim wrote an answer song called "Rattlesnake" for Chess Records' Checker subsidiary. In March 1953, Brim and His Gary Kings recorded "Rattlesnake" (Checker 769) at Universal Recording in Chicago. "Rattlesnake" and "It Was a Dream" were backed by Little Walter on blues harp; Willie Dixon on string bass; Fred Below on drums; and Louis and Dave Myers on guitar. However, when Don Robey threatened an injunction against Sun Records for the similar "Bear Cat", Leonard and Phil Chess, decided not to release "Rattlesnake" at that time. In 1969, these songs were released officially on Whose Muddy Shoes (1969: Chess LP 1537) with songs by both Brim and Elmore James, and the backing musicians credited as "his Stompers".
- Jake Porter's Combo Records released "Real Gone Hound Dog" (Combo 25), "an obscure 'answer' record to 'Hound Dog'", by Chuck Higgins and His Mellotones' with a vocal by Higgins' brother "Daddy Cleanhead". The composition was credited to Higgins and Porter (as V. Haven).
- "Call Me a Hound Dog", written by Bob Geddins, in which the hound dog states his case, was recorded by Blues singer Jimmy Wilson (as Jimmie Wilson) and His All Stars (with Hal "King" Solomon on piano) and released by Geddins' Big Town Records in May 1953 (Big Town Records 103). The review in the May 23 edition of Billboard describes this song as "the latest, and possibly the last in the long line of answers to 'Hound Dog', featuring Jimmy Wilson singing the tune okay style. Ork backs him in a blues manner but they could have added a stronger beat."
- Former Our Gang child actor Eugene Jackson and actress Juanita Moore (backed by the Eugene Jackson Trio and All Stars) also recorded "You Call Me a Hound Dog" about this time which was released on John Dolphin's Recorded In Hollywood label (421A).
- "New Hound Dog" (Big Town 116) by Frank "Dual Trumpeter" Motley and His Motley Crew, with vocals provided by Curley Bridges was recorded in October 1954 for Big Town Records, a subsidiary of 4 Star Records, owned by Bob Geddins. Motley is credited as the sole composer, and "King" Herbert Whitaker plays tenor saxophone. This song is described as "the first rocking rearrangement of 'Hound Dog'". It was re-released in Canada in 1956 by Quality Records (Quality K1544).

When the dust settled, the publishing for "Hound Dog" (in all variations) remained with Lion, and writing credit with Leiber and Stoller. In April 1954, Billboard's Rolontz summed up the events thusly: "The year 1953 saw an important precedent set in regard to answer tunes … since the 'Hound Dog' decision, few record firms have attempted to 'answer' smash hits by other companies by using same tune with different lyrics."

==== "Rip offs" ====
Two records were released that were neither cover versions of nor answers to Thornton's release, yet used a similar melody without any attribution to Leiber and Stoller. The first was Smiley Lewis's "Play Girl", credited to D. Bartholomew and released by the Imperial Records label (Imperial 45–5234) by the end of March 1953. Described as a "stomping uptempo boogie rocker", it began: "You ain't nothin' but a Play Girl / Staying out all night long". In April 1955, female impersonator Jesse "Big 'Tiny'" Kennedy recorded "Country Boy" accompanied by His Orchestra that was released by RCA's Groove Records (Groove 4G-0106) by May 21. While credited solely to Kennedy, this song has a similar melody to "Hound Dog": "'Country Boy' has a deceptively slouching flip on the 'Hound Dog' motif – this time with Tiny proclaiming proudly that he 'ain't nothing but a country boy'".

In the early 1970s, Robert Loers, owner of Dutch label Redita Records, found a song with the same melody as "Hound Dog" called "(You Ain't Nuttin' But a) Juicehead" on an anonymous acetate at Select-o-Hits, the Memphis distributorship owned by Sam Phillips' brother, Tom, where Sun artifacts were stored.

When Juice Head first appeared on a Redita Records LP [in 1974], it was credited to Rosco Gordon. But it's not Rosco. It simply is not him. Really. Even Rosco confirmed that. It might not even be a Memphis Recording Service demo. Just substitute the words "Hound Dog" for "Juice Head" and what have you got? Of course the inspiration for this song came from Big Mama Thornton's "Hound Dog" or perhaps even from Rufus Thomas' "Bear Cat". But the song's other parent is Eddie Vinson's slowed down "Juicehead Blues" which harks to the previous decade…If indeed this originated from Sam Phillips' studio, it was nothing that Phillips needed to touch because it was another lawsuit waiting to happen."

== Freddie Bell and the Bellboys' versions (1955–1956) ==
"Hound Dog"
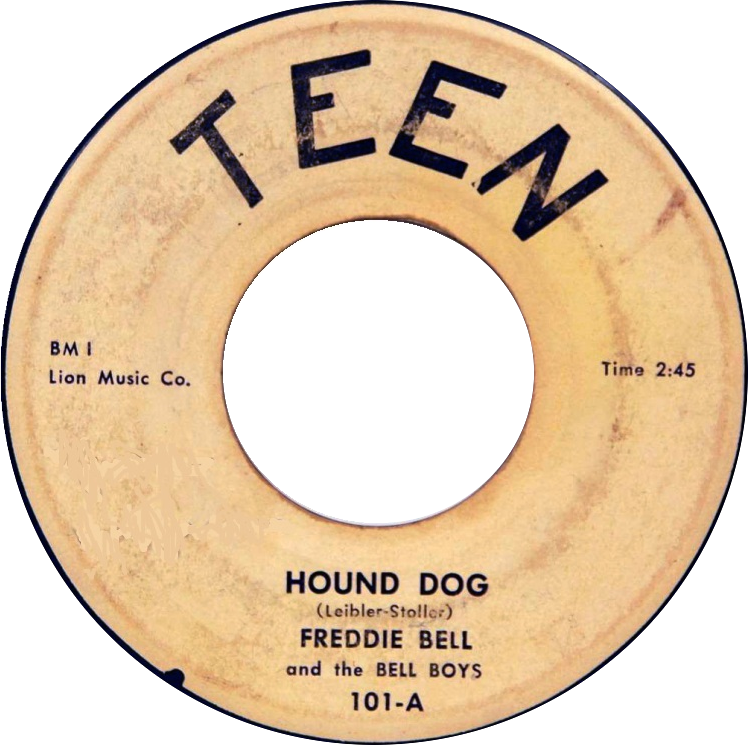

Single by Freddie Bell and the Bellboys
- B-side: "Move Me Baby'
- Released: 1955
- Recorded: Philadelphia, 1955
- Genre: Rock and roll
- Length: 2:45
- Label: Teen
- Songwriter: Jerry Leiber and Mike Stoller

By 1955 Philadelphia-based Teen Records co-founder Bernie Lowe suspected that "Hound Dog" could potentially have greater appeal, but knew it had to be sanitized for mainstream acceptance, and so asked popular Las Vegas lounge act Freddie Bell of Freddie Bell and the Bellboys, who had been performing songs with "tongue-in-cheek" humor as the band in residence at The Silver Queen Bar and Cocktail Lounge at The Sands Hotel and Casino soon after its opening in December 1952, to rewrite the lyrics for their first release on his label.

Bell removed innuendoes like "You can wag your tail but I ain't gonna feed you no more" and replaced them with sanitized lyrics, changing a racy song about a disappointing lover into a song that was literally about a dog. Musically, he gave the song a rock and roll rhythm. Jerry Leiber, the original lyricist, found these changes irritating, saying that the rewritten words made "no sense". Described as "one of their trademark spoofs", the Bellboys version became a staple of their Las Vegas act.

In early 1955 this version of "Hound Dog" became the first record released on Teen Records (TEEN 101), "a subsidiary of the equally obscure Sound Records", that was owned by Lowe; jazz impresario Nat Segal, who owned Downbeat, the first integrated nightclub in Philadelphia; and partially by American Bandstand's creator and first host Bob Horn. Their version of "Hound Dog", which includes "arf arf" dog sounds made by the band throughout the song, also included the "most overused rhythmic pattern" of the 1950s, the three-beat Latin bass riff pioneered by Dave Bartholomew that was also used in Rufus Thomas' "Bear Cat", a 1953 answer song to Thornton's original recording, and subsequently in Presley's 1956 recording. In June 1984, music researcher and historian George A. Moonoogian also "found a stylistic similarity" between Frank "Dual Trumpeter" Motley & His Crew's 1954 number "New Hound Dog" (Big Town 116) and Bell's 1955 Teen Records release of "Hound Dog". On the single's label, authorship is credited to Leibler [sic] and Stoller. No credit is given to Bell or anyone else for the revised lyrics. Their recording of "Hound Dog" was a local hit in the Philadelphia area, and received "lots of radio play on the east coast, and Bell found himself with a regional hit. Despite "Hound Dog" spending 16 weeks at number one on the pre-Dick Clark Bandstand, it attracted no national attention. However, the regional popularity of this release, along with the group's showmanship, yielded a tour; an appearance in the seminal pioneer rock and roll musical film Rock Around the Clock in January 1956; and eventually a recording contract with Mercury Records' Wing Records subsidiary by February 1956.

In May 1956 (two months before Presley recorded his version), Bell and the Bell Boys recorded a more up tempo version of the song for Mercury that was over 20 seconds shorter, and that also omitted the comedic "arf arf" dog sounds of their 1955 Teen Records version. However, Mercury did not release this new version until after the success of Presley's version. Initially released in France in late 1956 on an EP Rock 'n' Roll (Barclay 14159), it was released subsequently in 1957 in Australia (July 1957: Mercury Records 45152), Sweden (Rock'n'Roll Vol. 2; Mercury EP-1-3502), and Norway (Mercury EP MN5). As the legal dispute about its composition had not been resolved, authorship of the Mercury Records version is attributed to Leiber-Stoller-Otis. Mercury finally released Freddie Bell and the Bellboys' new version of "Hound Dog" in the USA on their debut album Rock & Roll ... All Flavors (Mercury MG 20289) in January 1958, but now crediting Leiber & Stoller only. Both the 1955 Teen Records (2:45) and the 1956 Mercury Records (2:22) versions of "Hound Dog" are included in the 1996 compilation album Rockin' Is Our Business (Germany: Bear Family Records BCD 15901).

== Elvis Presley's version (1956) ==
"Hound Dog"
- 1956 RCA Victor single picture sleeve

Single by Elvis Presley
- A-side: "Don't Be Cruel"
- Released: July 13, 1956
- Recorded: July 2, 1956
- Studio: RCA Victor, New York City
- Genre: Rock and roll
- Length: 2:15
- Label: RCA Victor
- Songwriter: Jerry Leiber and Mike Stoller
- Producers: Elvis Presley (uncredited), Stephen H. Sholes

Elvis Presley singles chronology
"I Want You, I Need You, I Love You" (1956)	"Hound Dog" (1956)	"Love Me Tender" (1956)

Music video
- "Hound Dog" (audio) on YouTube

Elvis Presley’s version owed more to Freddie Bell and the Bellboys' significantly reworked "Hound Dog”, which he had encountered at the Sands in 1956 during his first Vegas appearances.

According to Lieber and Stroller, Elvis was familiar with Thornton’s version, and along with Presley guitarist Scotty Moore and drummer D. J. Fontana, they confirmed that the Freddie Bell version was the model used.

Presley first performed "Hound Dog" in Vegas. in a slowed down burlesque much like Freddie Bell had done, including hip gyrations. Weeks later in Memphis Elvis made “Hound Dog” his closing number, and it remained as such until the later 1960s.

By the spring of 1956, Presley drew teenagers to his concerts in unprecedented numbers, with the enthusiastic reaction – particularly to "Hound Dog" – causing riots at some performances. Presley researcher Guillermo F. Perez-Argüello says:

Whatever Presley got from hearing Freddy Bell's version, which was sometime in April of 1956, lasted a couple of months only. In fact he sang it 21 times, live, at concerts and on television, using Bell's vocal arrangement but which also included his own blues version, at half speed, and only at the end, until he recorded it with what was undeniably, his own arrangement based not just on Scotty Moore's tremendously modern guitar work but his own rage and disgust at what had taken place the night before, at Steve Allen's Tonight Show, when he was forced to sing the song to a basset hound, and dressed in tails while simultaneously facing an audience of 40 million. And once he recorded it, it was his version which he chose to deliver, although by the end of 1956, he'd added inflections from the Thornton version as well.

=== Response ===
Larry Birnbaum described Elvis Presley's rendition of "Hound Dog" as "an emblem of the rock 'n' roll revolution". George Plasketes argues that Elvis Presley's version of "Hound Dog" should not be considered a cover "since [most listeners] … were innocent of Willie Mae Thornton's original 1953 release". Michael Coyle asserts that "Hound Dog", like almost all of Presley's "covers were all of material whose brief moment in the limelight was over, without the songs having become standards." While, because of its popularity, Presley's recording "arguably usurped the original", Plasketes concludes: "anyone who's ever heard the Big Mama Thornton original would probably argue otherwise." Presley was aware of and appreciated Big Mama Thornton's original recording of "Hound Dog", and had a copy in his personal record collection. Ron Smith, a schoolfriend of Presley's, says he remembers Presley singing along to a version by Tommy Duncan (lead singer for the classic lineup of Bob Wills and the Texas Playboys). According to another schoolmate, Presley's favorite r'n'b song was "Bear Cat (the Answer to Hound Dog)" by Rufus Thomas, a hero of Presley's.

Agreeing with Robert Fink, who claims that "Hound Dog" as performed by Presley was intended as a burlesque, "troping off white overreactions to a black sexual innuendo", Freya Jarman-Ivens asserts that "Presley's version of 'Hound Dog' started its life as a blackface comedy", in the manner of Al Jolson, but more especially "African-American performers with a penchant for 'clowning' – Louis Armstrong, Dizzy Gillespie, and Louis Jordan. It was Freddie Bell and the Bellboys' performance of the song (with Bell's amended lyrics) that influenced Presley's decision to perform, and later record and release, his own version: "Elvis's version of 'Hound Dog' (1956) came about, not as an attempt to cover Thornton's record, but as an imitation of a parody of her record performed by Freddie Bell and the Bellboys … The words, the tempo, and the arrangement of Elvis' 'Hound Dog' come not from Thornton's version of the song, but from the Bellboys'." According to Rick Coleman, the Bellboys' version "featured [Dave] Bartholomew's three-beat Latin riff, which had been heard in Bill Haley's 'Shake, Rattle and Roll'." Just as Haley had borrowed the riff from Bartholomew, Presley borrowed it from Bell and the Bellboys. The Latin riff form that was used in Presley's "Hound Dog" was known as "Habanera rhythm", which is a Spanish and African-American musical beat form. After the release of "Hound Dog" by Presley, the Habanera rhythm gained much popularity in American popular music.

When asked if Bell had any objections to Presley recording his own version, Bell gave Colonel Tom Parker, Presley's manager, a copy of his 1955 Teen Records' recording, hoping that if Presley recorded it, "he might reap some benefit when his own version was released on an album". According to Bell, "[Parker] promised me that if I gave him the song, the next time Elvis went on tour, I would be the opening act for him—which never happened." In another interview Bell said: "I hope my career is more than giving 'Hound Dog' to Elvis". In May 1956, two months before Presley's release, Bell re-recorded a more frantic version of the song for the Mercury label; however, it was not released as a single until 1957. It was later included on Bell's 1957 album, Rock & Roll…All Flavors (Mercury Records MG 20289).

=== Television performances ===
Presley first performed "Hound Dog" for a nationwide television audience on The Milton Berle Show on June 5, 1956. It was his second appearance on Berle's program. At Berle's request, Presley appeared without his guitar, the first time he had done so on national television. By this time, Presley's band had added instrumental flourishes to the song: Scotty Moore had added a guitar solo, and D.J. Fontana had added a drum roll between verses. The performance started in an upbeat tempo in the style of the Bellboys, but dropped to a half tempo for the dramatic finish. Presley's movements during the performance were energetic and sexually charged, especially his hip gyrations, and the reactions of young women in the studio audience were enthusiastic, as shown on the broadcast. According to Robert Fink, "Hound Dog" as performed by Presley on Berle's show was intended to be humorous, "troping off white overreactions to a black sexual innuendo". Over 40,000,000 people saw the performance.

Unfortunately for Presley, the mainstream public did not find the sexually charged performance amusing, and controversy erupted. It was the first major controversy of Presley's career. Letters of protest poured into the NBC mailroom, critics called the performance vulgar, moral watchdogs raised concerns about juvenile delinquency, and even the Catholic Church published an opinion piece entitled "Beware Elvis Presley". The performance earned Presley the sobriquet "Elvis the Pelvis". Ed Sullivan, host of a popular televised variety show, publicly stated that he would never feature Presley. Steve Allen, who had already booked Presley for The Steve Allen Show on NBC, faced pressure from network executives to cancel the performance. Allen refused, insisting he would control the performance so it would not offend the public's sensibilities.

Presley appeared on The Steve Allen Show on July 1 that year. Steve Allen, who was notoriously contemptuous of rock 'n' roll music and especially songs such as "Hound Dog", ensured that the performance had a comedic bent, cracking jokes and presenting Presley with a signed prop toilet paper roll as a play on the name of the genre. Presley performed in full evening dress (not Black tie or tuxedo) while singing an abbreviated version of "Hound Dog" to an actual top hat-wearing Basset Hound. Presley was reportedly a good sport about the silliness while on the show, but Presley would later recall it as an extremely embarrassing moment. Scotty Moore later suggested that Presley's anger about the way Allen orchestrated the performance drove the aggressive style that he recorded "Hound Dog" in the very next day.

Although Ed Sullivan had publicly stated he would never invite Presley onto his show, the ratings success of Presley's appearance on The Steve Allen Show convinced him to reconsider. Sullivan wound up paying $50,000 for Presley to appear on the Ed Sullivan Show three times; "Hound Dog" was performed during each appearance. On September 9, 1956, with the song topping several U.S. charts, Presley's set featured an abbreviated version of "Hound Dog". During his second appearance on October 28, Presley jokingly introduced the song as "one of the saddest songs we've ever heard", before playing it in full. In the third and final appearance on January 6, 1957, Presley performed seven songs, including "Hound Dog". This proved to be Presley's last live performance on American television.

=== Recording ===
For 7 hours from 2:00 pm on July 2, 1956, the day after the Steve Allen Show performance, Presley recorded "Hound Dog" along with "Don't Be Cruel" and "Any Way You Want Me" for RCA Victor at RCA's New York City studio with his regular band of Scotty Moore on lead guitar, Bill Black on bass, D. J. Fontana on drums, and backing vocals from the Jordanaires. Despite its popularity in his live shows, Presley had neither planned nor prepared to record "Hound Dog", but agreed to do so at the insistence of RCA's assigned producer Stephen H. Sholes, who argued that "'Hound Dog' was so identified with Elvis that fans would demand a record of the concert standard." According to Ace Collins: "Elvis may not have wanted to record 'Hound Dog', but he had a definite idea of how he wanted the finished product to sound. Though he usually slowed it down and treated it like a blues number in concert, in the studio Elvis wanted the song to come off as fast and dynamic." While the producing credit was given to Sholes, the studio recordings reveal that Presley produced the songs himself, which is verified by the band members. Gordon Stoker, First Tenor of the Jordanaires, who were chosen to provide backup vocals, recalls: "They had demos on almost everything that Elvis recorded, and we'd take it from the demo. We'd listen to the demo, most of the time, and we'd take it from the demo. We had (Big) Mama Thornton's record on 'Hound Dog', since she had a record on that. After listening to it we actually thought it was awful and couldn't figure out why Elvis wanted to do that." However, what Stoker did not realize was that Presley wanted to record the version he saw in Las Vegas by Freddie Bell and the Bellboys that he had been performing since May. As session pianist Emidio "Shorty Long" Vagnoni left to work on a rehearsal for a stage show, Stoker plays piano on this recording of "Hound Dog". As Stoker was unable to also sing first tenor, "the Jordanaires try to come up with a combined sound as best they can to cover it, and Gordon laughs as he states, 'That's one of the worst sounds we ever got on any record!' However Elvis insists on doing the song, and the results, albeit without Gordon singing tenor, will still do more than please the masses. Gordon also related that Elvis very much knew in his mind what he wanted the final results to be so they didn't spend a lot of time working out tempos." In response to journalist Dave Schwensen, who said: "I remember reading an interview a few years ago with Keith Richards from the Rolling Stones ... "He was talking about the second guitar break on the recording of 'Hound Dog' and said it sounded like you just took off your guitar, dropped it on the floor and it got the perfect sound. He said he's never been able to figure out how you did that.", in 2002 Scotty Moore indicated: "

I don't know either," ... "Ahh … I was actually pissed off to tell'ya the truth." ... "It was just … Sometimes in the studio you do it too many times and you go past that peak. Like three takes before was really the one you should use. That was it. We had done the thing, ("Hound Dog"). I think it was printed somewhere that we did it about forty or sixty … I don't know, give or take. But if someone was counting it off, just a couple notes and we stop, that's a take. You know? 'Take Two.' But I was frustrated for some reason and in the second solo I just went, BLAH."

Musicologist Robert Fink asserts that "Elvis drove the band through thirty-one takes, slowly fashioning a menacing, rough-trade version quite different than the one they had been performing on the stage." The result of Presley's efforts was an "angry hopped-up version" of "Hound Dog". Citing Presley's anger at his treatment on the Steve Allen Show the previous evening, Peter Nazareth sees this recording as "revenge on Steve ("you ain't no friend of mine") Allen, and as a protest at being censored on national TV." In analyzing Presley's recording, Fink asserts that

"Hound Dog" is "notable for an unremitting level of what can only be called rock and roll dissonance: Elvis just shouts, leaving behind almost completely the rich vocal timbres ("romantic lyricism") and mannerist rhythmic play on added syllables ("boogification") that Richard Middleton identifies as the cornerstones of his art. Scotty Moore's guitar is feral: playing rhythm he stays in the lowest register, slashing away at open fifths and hammering the strong beats with bent and distorted pitches; his repetitive breaks are stinging and even, when he begins one chorus in the wrong key, quite literally atonal ... And the Jordanaires, a gospel quartet who would provide wonderfully subtle rhythmic backup on the next song Elvis recorded at the session, 'Don't Be Cruel', are just hanging on for the ride during this one, while drummer D.J. Fontana just goes plumb crazy. Fontana's machine-gun drumming on this record has become deservedly famous: the only part of his kit consistently audible in the mix is the snare, played so loud and insistently that the RCA engineers just gave up and let his riffs distort into splatters of clipped noise. The overall effect could not be more different from the amused, relaxed contempt of Big Mama Thornton; it is reminiscent of nothing so much as late 1970s white punk rage – the Ramones, Iggy Pop, the Sex Pistols.

In the end, Presley chose version 28, declaring: "This is the one." During the day Presley's manager Colonel Tom Parker told RCA vice president Larry Kananga that "Hound Dog" "may become such a big hit that RCA may have to change its corporate symbol from the 'Victor Dog' to the 'Hound Dog'." Although Presley knew about Big Mama Thornton's version of "Hound Dog", the lyrics to his recording of the song were actually based on the Freddie and Bellboys 1955 version, which involved the lyrics being rewritten to make the song's subject a dog rather than a man.

After this recording, Presley performed this "angry hopped-up version" of "Hound Dog" in his concerts, and also on his performances on The Ed Sullivan Show on September 9 and October 28, 1956.

=== Release and reception ===
"Hound Dog" (G2WW-5935) was initially released as the B-side to the single "Don't Be Cruel" (G2WW-5936) on July 13, 1956. Soon after the single was re-released with "Hound Dog" first and in larger print than "Don't Be Cruel" on the record sleeve. Both sides of the record topped Billboard's Best Sellers in Stores and Most Played in Jukeboxes charts alongside "Don't Be Cruel", while "Hound Dog" on its own merit topped the country & western and rhythm & blues charts and peaked at number one on Billboard's main pop chart, the Top 100. Later reissues of the single by RCA in the 1960s designated the pair as double-A-sided. By August 18, 1956, Peacock Records had re-released Big Mama Thornton's original recording of "Hound Dog", backing it with "Rock-a-Bye Baby" (Peacock 5–1612), but it failed to chart.

Stoller learned of the Presley cover from Leiber after returning from vacation in Europe. He expressed some disappointment in the success of the cover: "It just sounded terribly nervous, too fast, too white. But you know, after it sold seven or eight million records it started to sound better." Leiber and Stoller tired of explaining that Presley had dropped most of their lyrics. For example, Leiber complained about Presley adding the line, "You ain't never caught a rabbit, and you ain't no friend of mine", calling it "inane… It doesn't mean anything to me." Forty years later, Leiber told music journalist Rikky Rooksby that Presley had stamped the hit with his own identity: "(A) white singer from Memphis who's a hell of a singer—he does have some black attitudes—takes the song over … But here's the thing: we didn't make it. His version is like a combination of country and skiffle. It's not black. He sounds like Hank Snow. In most cases where we are attributed with rock and roll, it's misleading, because what we did is usually the original record—which is R&B—and some other producer (and a lot of them are great) covered our original record."

In September 1956, Democratic congressman Emanuel Celler expressed disgust at "the bad taste that is exemplified by Elvis Presley's 'Hound Dog' music, with his animal gyrations". In October 1956 Melody Maker critic Steve Race reacted negatively to Presley's rendition of "Hound Dog", saying that "for sheer repulsiveness coupled with the monotony of incoherence, 'Hound Dog' hit a new low in my experience." Race later stated: "it is a thoroughly bad record", lacking in "tone, intelligibility, musicianship, taste [and] subtlety", and defying "the decent limits of guitar amplification".

In 1957 Frank Sinatra supported US Senator George Smathers' crusade against "inferior music", including "Hound Dog", which Sinatra sarcastically referred to as "a masterpiece". Oscar Hammerstein II had "a particular loathing of 'Hound Dog'". In 1960, Perry Como told The Saturday Evening Post: "When I hear 'Hound Dog' I have to vomit a little, but in 1975 it will probably be a slightly ancient classic." Albin J. Zak III, Professor of Music at the State University of New York, Albany, in his inaugural American Musicological Society/Rock & Roll Hall of Fame lecture, "'A Thoroughly Bad Record': Elvis Presley's 'Hound Dog' as Rock and Roll Manifesto", in October 2011 asserted: "In retrospect … we can recognize defining moments of crystallization … The record was widely scorned by music industry veterans and high-pop aficionados, yet in its rude enthusiasm it represents an emphatic assertion of aesthetic principle at the dawn of rock and roll." In 1997 Bob Dylan indicated that Presley's record influenced his decision to get into music: "What got me into the whole thing in the beginning wasn't songwriting. When 'Hound Dog' came across the radio, there was nothing in my mind that said, 'Wow, what a great song, I wonder who wrote that?' … It was just … it was just there."

Presley's "Hound Dog" sold over 4 million copies in the United States on its first release. It was his best-selling single and, starting in July 1956, it spent eleven weeks at number one—a record not eclipsed until Boyz II Men's "End of the Road" held at the top for 13 weeks in 1992. It stayed in the number one spot until it was replaced by "Love Me Tender", also recorded by Presley. Billboard ranked it as the number two song for 1956. "Hound Dog" would go on to sell 10 million copies worldwide, including 5 million in the United States alone. In 1958 the "Hound Dog"/"Don't Be Cruel" single became just the third record to sell more than three million copies, following Bing Crosby's "White Christmas" and Gene Autry's "Rudolph the Red-Nosed Reindeer".

Despite its commercial success, "Elvis used to say that 'Hound Dog' was the silliest song he'd ever sung and thought it might sell ten or twelve records right around his folks' neighborhood." By the end of summer 1956, after Presley's recording of the song was a million-seller, Freddie Bell, who had introduced his version of the song to Presley in April, told an interviewer: "I didn't feel bad about that at all. In fact, I encouraged him to record it." However, after the success of Presley's recording, "Bell sued to get some of the composer royalties because he had changed the words and indeed the song, and he would have made millions as the songwriter of Elvis's version: but he lost because he did not ask Leiber & Stoller for permission to make the changes and thereby add his name as songwriter."

Following Presley's version of "Hound Dog", Leiber and Stoller would write numerous songs for Presley.

==== Later notable performances ====
Presley's final performance on stage for almost 8 years was a benefit concert for the USS Arizona Memorial on Sunday, March 25, 1961, at the Bloch Arena in Pearl Harbor. During this concert, which raised nearly $65,000 for the USS Arizona Memorial building fund, Presley closed the concert singing "Hound Dog". Presley performed a high-energy version of "Hound Dog" in his legendary Comeback Special that aired on December 3, 1968, on the NBC television network. After the ratings success of this program, on July 31, 1969, Presley returned to perform in Las Vegas for the first time since his unsuccessful performances in April and May 1956. Booked for a four-week, fifty-seven show engagement at the International Hotel, which has just been built and has the largest showroom in the city, "this engagement breaks all existing Las Vegas attendance records and attracts rave reviews from the public and the critics. It is a triumph." Presley's first live album, Elvis in Person at the International Hotel, Las Vegas, Nevada was recorded during this engagement and was soon released. During this concert, Presley introduced "Hound Dog" as his "special song". "Never one to take himself too seriously, Elvis joked with the crowd about the old days and the old songs. At one point, he decided to dedicate his next number to the audience and the staff at the International: 'This is the only song I could think of that really expresses my feeling toward the audience', he said in all earnestness, before bursting into 'Hound Dog'."

Presley performed "Hound Dog" in his historic Aloha from Hawaii via Satellite concert special that was the "first entertainment special to be broadcast live around the world," on January 14, 1973. Beamed via Globecam Satellite to Australia, South Korea, Japan, Thailand, the Philippines, South Vietnam and other countries, it was also seen on a delayed basis in around thirty European countries. An expanded version was broadcast on NBC in the USA on April 4, 1973, on NBC, attracting 51% of the television viewing audience, and was seen in more American households than the July 1969 Moon landing. Eventually it was seen in about forty countries by one billion to 1.5 billion people.

=== Awards and accolades ===
In 1988, Presley's original 1956 RCA recording was inducted into the Grammy Hall of Fame. In December 2004, Rolling Stone magazine ranked it No. 19 on their list of the 500 Greatest Songs of All Time, the highest ranked of Presley's eleven entries. In March 2005, Q magazine placed Presley's version at number 55 of Q Magazine's 100 Greatest Guitar Tracks. Presley's version is listed as one of the Rock and Roll Hall of Fame's "500 Songs That Shaped Rock and Roll".

=== Charts and certifications ===
==== Weekly charts ====
Chart (1956–1957)	Peak position
Australia (Kent Music Report)	17
Belgium (Ultratop 50 Flanders)	13
Belgium (Ultratop 50 Wallonia)	8
UK Singles (Official Charts)	2
US Billboard The Hot 100	1
US Billboard Best Sellers in Stores	1
US Billboard Most Played by Jockeys	4
US Billboard Most Played in Jukeboxes	1
US Billboard Most Played Country & Western Singles	6
US Billboard Most Played Country & Western in Jukeboxes	1
US Billboard Most Played Rhythm and Blues Singles	2
US Billboard Most Played Rhythm and Blues in Jukeboxes	1
US Billboard Top Selling Country & Western Singles	1
US Billboard Top Selling Rhythm and Blues Singles	1
US Cash Box Magazine Top Country & Western Singles	1

Chart (1971)	Peak position
UK Singles (Official Charts)	41

Chart (1974)	Peak position
Netherlands (Single Top 100)	21

Chart (2007)	Peak position
Ireland (IRMA)	25
Netherlands (Single Top 100)	83
UK Singles (Official Charts)	14

==== Year-End charts ====
Chart (1956)	Peak position
US Billboard (Best Sellers in Stores)	8
US Singles (Cash Box)	15

==== Sales and certifications ====
Region	Certification	Certified units/sales
United Kingdom (BPI)	Gold	400,000^{‡}
United States (RIAA)	4× Platinum	5,000,000
^{‡} Sales+streaming figures based on certification alone.

=== Responses ===
The commercial success of Presley's 1956 RCA version of "Hound Dog" precipitated a proliferation of cover versions, answer songs, and parodies. Additionally, "Hound Dog" was translated into several languages, including German, Spanish, Portuguese, French, and even Bernese German.

=== Other cover versions ===
By 1964, Presley's version of "Hound Dog" had been covered over 26 times, and by 1984, there were at least 85 different cover versions of the song, making it "the best-known and most often recorded Rock & Roll song". In July 2013 the official Leiber & Stoller website listed 266 different versions of "Hound Dog", but acknowledged that its list is incomplete. Among the notable artists who have covered Presley's version of "Hound Dog" are: Gene Vincent and His Blue Caps; Jerry Lee Lewis; Chubby Checker; Pat Boone; Sammy Davis Jr.; Betty Everett; Little Richard; The Surfaris; the Everly Brothers; Junior Wells; the Mothers of Invention; The Easybeats; Jimi Hendrix; Vanilla Fudge; Van Morrison; Conway Twitty; John Lennon and the Plastic Ono Elephant's Memory Band; John Entwistle; Carl Perkins; Eric Clapton; James Taylor; and (in 1993) Tiny Tim (in his full baritone voice). In 1999 David Grisman, John Hartford, and Mike Seeger included "Hound Dawg" on their 1999 album Retrograss, which was nominated for a Grammy Award for Best Traditional Folk Album at the 42nd Annual Grammy Awards in 2000.

Australian band Sherbet released "Hound Dog" in 1973 as a non-album single, backed with "Can I Drive You Home?". It reached number 18 on the Kent Music Report and appeared at number 21 on the Go-Set year-end chart.

==== Beatles and John Lennon cover versions ====
As Elvis Presley was a major seminal influence on Paul McCartney and John Lennon, and "Hound Dog" was a favorite of the young Lennon and his mother, during The Beatles' early career "Hound Dog" was one of the songs Lennon and McCartney as the Quarrymen and later as the Beatles played from August 1957 through 1961. No recorded version is known to survive. On August 30, 1972, Lennon performed the song with the Plastic Ono Elephant's Memory Band at Madison Square Garden, New York City, in one of his last charity concerts, and was released on his Live in New York album on January 24, 1986. John Lennon also recorded "Hound Dog" during his huge rehearsal of early Rock and Roll classics (for the Madison Square Garden concert) that was released on the unauthorized album S.I.R. John Winston Ono Lennon. Tony Sheridan (who was asked to join the young Beatles) also recorded the Presley version of "Hound Dog".

=== Foreign-language versions ===
Among those artists who have recorded non-English versions of "Hound Dog" are:

- Ralf Bendix (in German, as "Heut Geh' Ich Nicht Nach Hause") (1957); ("Today I'm Not Going Home")
- Die Rock and Rollers with the Johannes Fehring Orchestra (in German, as "Das Ist Rock And Roll") (lyrics: Fini Busch) (1957);
- Dyno Y Los Solitarios (in Mexican Spanish, as "Sabueso") (1960: Discos Audiomex). ("Hound")
- Los Rogers (in Spanish, as "El Twist Del Perro") (1961); ("Dog Twist")
- Lucky Blondo (in French, as "Un Vieux Chien de Chasse") on his album To Elvis from Nashville (1977: Philips) ("An Old Hound")
- Angela Ro Ro (in Brazilian Portuguese, as "Hot-Dog") (1984)
- Züri West (in Bernese German as "Souhung") on their album Elvis (June 15, 1990: Black Cat at Sound Service)
- Aurelio Morata (in Spanish, as "Perra Boba") Tributo Al Rey (1997: Picap)

=== Parodies ===
After the Presley version of "Hound Dog" became a commercial success, Homer and Jethro parodied it as "Houn' Dawg" (RCA Victor 47–6706; 20–6706), including such lines as: "You look like an Airedale, with the air let out". Several parodies emphasized the cross-cultural appeal of Presley's record. Lalo "Pancho Lopez" Guerrero, the father of Chicano music, released a parody version in 1956 entitled "Pound Dog" (L&M LM1002) about a chihuahua. In January 1957, Jewish American satirist Mickey Katz released a Yinglish novelty song version, "You're a Doity Dog" (Capitol F3607), singing with a Yiddish accent, and having a klezmer break between verses. In this freilach-rock song, Katz sang "You ain't nothin' but a paskudnick". By March 1957, veteran country singer Cliff Johnson responded to the popularity of Presley's "Hound Dog" by recording his self-penned "Go 'Way Hound Dog (Let Me Sing My Blues)" (Columbia 4-40865; Australia: Coronet Records KW-022), described in Billboard as "rockabilly that professes satiation with rockabilly music." In 1991, Elvis "translator" El Vez, backed by The Memphis Mariachis, released "(You Ain't Nothin' But a) Chihuahua", a "Chicano Power parody" that opens with: "You ain't nothin' but a Chihuahua/ Yapping all the time."

Encouraged by the 1994 decision of the U.S. Supreme Court in Campbell v. Acuff-Rose Music, Inc. that "ruled that … musicians do not have to obtain permission from the original artists to perform and record parodies of those compositions", other parodies of "Hound Dog" emerged subsequently. These include "Found God", a self-acknowledged parody of Presley's version by popular Christian band ApologetiX, which, using the original tune, opens with: "I ain't nothin' but I found God/It took quite a long time".

== Litigation ==
Over the years "Hound Dog" "has been the subject of an inordinate number of lawsuits", and "would eventually become one of the most litigated songs in recorded music history".

=== Lion Music Publishing Company v. Sun Records (1953) ===
==== Background ====
On September 9, 1952, the copyright application for "Hound Dog" was lodged. On the application the words & music are attributed to Don Deadric Robey & Willie Mae Thornton, with the copyright claimants listed as: "Murphy L. Robey (W) & Willie Mae Thornton (A). It was renewed subsequently on May 13, 1980, with the same details.

By the end of 1953 at least six "answer songs" that responded to 'Big Mama' Thornton's original version of "Hound Dog" were released. According to Peacock Records's Don Robey, these songs were "bastardizations" of the original and reduced its sales potential. These included:

- "Mr. Hound Dog's in Town" recorded on March 18 by Blues shouter Roy Brown for King Records (45–4627). While it had the same melody and many of the same lyrics as the original, Brown is credited as the sole writer.
- "(You Ain't Nothin' But a Female) Hound Dog" (King 45–1212) recorded by vocalist Charlie Gore and guitarist Louis Innis on March 22 for King Records on March 22. This song was credited to Innis, Lois Mann (a pseudonym of King Records owner Syd Nathan, the latter his wife's maiden name), and Johnny Otis.
- "Rattlesnake" recorded by blues guitarist John Brim for Chess Records' Checker subsidiary with Little Walter on blues harp.
- "Real Gone Hound Dog" (Combo 25), "an obscure 'answer' record to 'Hound Dog'", recorded by Chuck Higgins and His Mellotones' with a vocal by Higgins' brother "Daddy Cleanhead" for Jake Porter's Combo Records. The composition was credited to Higgins and Porter (as V. Haven).

However, the most popular of the answer songs to "Hound Dog" was "Bear Cat (The Answer To Hound Dog)" (Sun 181) recorded by Memphis disc jockey Rufus Thomas (adopting the nickname, "Rufus 'Hound Dog' Thomas") at Sun Studios at 706 Union Avenue, Memphis.on March 8, 1953, just two weeks after Thornton's original version was released, and even before a review of "Hound Dog" had been published in Billboard. While retaining the same melody as "Hound Dog", Sun founder Sam Phillips wrote new lyrics, in which he altered the gender of the singer, who bemoaned that his woman was a "bear cat", a Jazz Age slang term for "a hot-blooded or fiery girl". The record's spare electric guitar work by Memphis bluesman Joe Hill Louis was greatly influenced by that of Pete Lewis on the original. According to James M. Salem:

[I]nstead of barking and howling there is meowing and hissing in the background. In true answer form, the gender of the participants was reversed. This time the protagonist is male, directly challenging the worthless female of the original song—correcting her previous insults and re-directing them at her. "You know what you said about me woman?" says the man in open confrontation. "Well…You ain't nothin' but a bear cat, scratchin' at my door." All the irony and sarcasm of the original is captured in the answer, even the sexuality: "You can purr, pretty kitty, but I ain't gonna rub you no more."

By the end of March, "Bear Cat" was in stores, prompting Billboard to describe it as "the fastest answer song to hit the market". It became both Thomas' and Sun Records' first hit, eventually reaching number three on the R&B charts. However, as Phillips claimed a writing credit for the song, a copyright-infringement suit ensued that nearly bankrupted Phillips' record label.

On March 28, Billboard reported that, "In an effort to combat what has become a rampant practice by small labels—the rushing out of answers which are similar in melody and/or theme to ditties which have become smash hits—many pubbers are now retaining attorneys. Common practice, of course is to regard the answer as an original. Currently publishers are putting up a fight to protect their originals from unauthorised or infringing answers." In that same issue, Robey told Billboard he had notified the Harry Fox publishing agency "to issue Sun a license on 'Bear Cat' in order that Robey might collect a royalty".

On April 4, 1953, Robey wrote to Phillips that, "unless contracts are signed and in the office of Mr. Harris Fox by Wednesday, April 8, 1953, I will be forced to take immediate steps with Court Actions", hoping "this will not cause any unfriendly relations, but please remember that I have to pay when I intrude upon the rights of others, and certainly must protect my own rights." On April 11 Bob Rolontz reported in Billboard: "The answers to r&b tunes, which have become prolific with the many replies to such smash hits as 'I Don't Know', 'Mama' and 'Hound Dog' are being given a serious scrutiny by the original copyright holders of the tunes on the original hit waxings. It appears they do not think too highly of writing an answer to a hit unless a license is obtained and permission to write a parody is given by the publisher." On the prior page, Peacock Records placed an advertisement promoting Thornton's release as "The Original Version of 'Hound Dog'", warning: "Beware of Imitations – Follow the Leader for Good Results" before reminding the reader: "The Original – The Best". Two pages later, Intro Records touted the version by Tommy Duncan and the Miller Bros. as "Best of them all!!!"

==== Proceedings ====
Their requests for payment having been ignored, Robey and two other music publishers initiated unprecedented legal proceedings in April against the record companies that released these competing songs, alleging copyright infringement. As a result, Chess Records withdrew Brim's "Rattlesnake" from sale. In the Memphis courts, Lion Publishing Co. sought royalties and treble damages, claiming "Bear Cat" was "a dead steal". In May, Phillips responded: "There's a lot of difference in the words. As for the tune, there's practically no melody, but a rhythm pattern", adding that it is hard to differentiate between any two 12-bar blues songs. By June 1953 in a "precedent-setting" decision the Court ruled against Phillips, and upheld the charges of plagiarism, finding the tune and some of the lyrics of "Bear Cat" to be identical to those of "Hound Dog". Phillips was ordered to pay 2% of all of the profits of "Bear Cat" plus court costs. As this amounted to $35,000 compensation, Phillips was reduced to near bankruptcy, ultimately forcing him to sell Elvis Presley's Sun contract to RCA for $35,000 to raise the funds to settle his debts. On June 4, 1953, Jet reported that:

"The Sun Record Company of Memphis agreed to pay $2,080 to a Texas Recording firm because its blues tune, Bear Cat, is too similar to Hound Dog. Lion Publishing Company of Houston, Tex., won the out-of-court settlement after contending in a court suit that Bear Cat was a "conscious imitation" of their own recording with "only minor variations". Sam C. Phillips of Sun Record agreed to pay Hound Dog owners two cents per record for 79,000 waxings of Bear Cat already sold and two cents a record for future sales.

On July 8 Robey wrote to Phillips again, thanking him "kindly for your co-operation in this matter", but Phillips still refused to purchase a mechanical license for Thomas' "Bear Cat". Robey then instructed his company lawyer Irving Marcus to sue Phillips and Sun Records, hoping to use this as a test case to determine the legal status of all answer songs. While earlier pressings of Sun 181 bore the caption "(The Answer To Hound Dog)" above the A-side title, as a result of the legal action this was removed from all later pressings. In the 1980s, Sam Phillips conceded: "I should have known better. The melody was exactly the same as theirs, but we claimed the credit for writing the damn thing".

=== King Records vs Lion Publishing Co. and Lion Publishing Co. vs King Records & Valjo Music (1953) ===
In late July 1953 Syd Nathan, president of King Records, took Robey and his Lion Publishing Company to court. The August 1, 1953 Billboard reported: "Lion [Music] itself was in court defending the contention of Syd Nathan Records [sic] in Cincinnati that he had an interest in the song 'Hound Dog' and should have a fifty per cent share of its success." Nathan claimed that Valjo Music, one of King Records' publishing affiliates, had legal rights to the song as Johnny Otis, who claimed to be a co-author, was under exclusive contract to them at the time. An article entitled "New Howl Goes Up Over 'Hound Dog' Infringement" in The Pittsburgh Courier of August 8, 1953 reported:

You ain't nothin' but a hound dog" is becoming a battle cry faster than a pup can clean a bone. "Hound Dog" has been howling on the juke boxes for several months and all this time the record has been hounded by imitations and sundry other misfortunes. One thing is sure: this is the most profitable hound dog since Eliza slid across the ice. This is the latest episode: King Records joined the pack this week in the legal hassle over who's gonna get the profits from the current rhythm Dog." ... Valjo, meanwhile, is complaining that one of the writers of the tune, Johnny Otis, was under exclusive contract to them when he wrote the tune in collaboration with others and they are claiming 50 per cent of the publisher's share of the tune. At any rate, on it goes and the big problem now seems to be, how much Is that "Hound Dog" In the juke box worth?

In response, Robey counter-sued both King Records and Valjo Music over Roy Brown's answer record, and also over Little Esther's cover record (King 12126). When the dust settled, the publishing for "Hound Dog" (in all variations) remained with Lion, and writing credit with Leiber and Stoller. In April, 1954, Billboard's Rolontz summed up the events thusly: "The year 1953 saw an important precedent set in regard to answer tunes … since the 'Hound Dog' decision, few record firms have attempted to 'answer' smash hits by other companies by using same tune with different lyrics."

=== Valjo Music Publishing Corporation v. Elvis Presley Music (1956–1957) ===
The most protracted lawsuit involving "Hound Dog" was Valjo Music Publishing Corporation v. Elvis Presley Music that was initiated in the United States District Court for the Southern District of New York in October 1956, after the commercial success of Elvis Presley's version of the song, and concluded in December 1957. It would be the first "legal spat" for Presley's publishing company, Elvis Presley Music.

==== Background ====
Leiber and Stoller were introduced to Otis in July 1952 by Federal Records' Ralph Bass when Otis needed songs for artists he was recording for Federal, including Little Esther, Little Willie Littlefield, and Bobby Nunn of The Robins. In exchange for Otis using their songs, Leiber and Stoller gave Otis a one-third interest in those songs and assigned the publishing to Otis' company, Valjo Music Publishing Company. Similarly, on August 30, 1952, Leiber and Stoller signed a contract with Spin Music Inc.—another publishing company in which Otis held an interest—assigning it certain rights to "Hound Dog" and some other songs in exchange for royalties to be divided equally between Leiber, Stoller, and Otis. When the song was copyrighted initially on September 9, 1952, words and music were credited to Don Deadric Robey and Willie Mae Thornton, with Lion Publishing Co. identified as the registered publisher. However, on March 26, 1953, it was credited to Leiber, Stoller, and Otis; and Valjo Music—not Spin—was the registered publisher.

According to the findings of the court in Valjo Music Publishing Corporation v. Elvis Presley Music: "Thereafter Otis, in apparent disregard of the contracts both with Spin Music Inc. and plaintiff, arranged to have 'Hound Dog' published by Lion Music Publishing Company of Houston, Texas, and released by its affiliate Peacock Records. Otis executed a writer-publisher contract on October 10, 1952, with Lion Music Publishing Company in which Leiber, Otis and Stoller were described as the writers of 'Hound Dog.'" Thus, Otis received a co-writing credit with Leiber and Stoller on Thornton's Peacock Records release and on all of the 1953 cover versions. The court also noted: "Otis signed not only his name but also signed—or perhaps forged—the names of Stoller and Leiber to it. The president or proprietor of Lion Music Publishing Company noted the similarity of the handwriting of the signatures and made contact with Leiber and Stoller who advised him that Otis had no authority to sign their names to the agreement and that Otis was not a co-author of the song, although he was entitled to receive one-third of the royalties. Lion then arranged for a contract with Leiber and Stoller alone for the publishing rights." In order for Leiber and Stoller to execute the contract with Lion—"which, because we were underage, had to be signed by our mothers"—a court appointed Mary Stein (for Leiber) and Adelyn Stoller (for Stoller) as their legal guardians in late April 1953. The contract assigned the publishing for "Hound Dog" to Lion. Otis' credit was omitted from all subsequent records. Following on the popularity of Elvis' live and televised performances of "Hound Dog", Elvis Presley Music made the acquisition of half the publishing for the song from Lion Music a precondition to issuing a recording, to which Robey assented.

==== Proceedings ====
In October 1956, the success of Presley's version (sales at that time exceeded 2 million copies) prompted Valjo to sue Leiber and Stoller and Elvis Presley Music (an affiliate of Hill & Range Songs) for an accounting of profits and for damages and to have Otis restored as co-writer and recover damages for lost royalties. In Valjo Music Publishing Corporation v. Elvis Presley Music, Otis as plaintiff alleged that he was the co-author of "Hound Dog" along with two defendants, Leiber and Stoller. The defendants denied that Otis wrote any part of the song. On August 26, 1956, Otis signed a release of any claims to the song in exchange for $750. In court, Otis claimed that he had done so because he had learned that the defendants were legally infants at the time of the original contracts in 1952, and would, therefore, disaffirm any contract that they had with him. This made no sense to the United States Southern District of Court of New York: "Otis was a man who had many years experience in the music business. He must have realized that even though Leiber and Stoller were infants they could not disaffirm his co-authorship of a song, if in fact he had been a co-author." Further, while Leiber and Stoller acknowledged that they had given Otis one-third of the mechanical rights for the original Thornton recording, they denied giving him one-third authorship credit. On December 4, 1957, Federal Court Judge Archie O. Dawson dismissed Valjo's claim in the New York Federal Court, on the basis that Otis was "unworthy of belief", that he admitted forging Leiber and Stoller's signatures on a declaration to third-party publisher Lion Music, that Leiber and Stoller were underage at the time, and that Otis had signed a release to any claims for $750. As the evidence would not sustain Valjo's contention that Otis had collaborated in the writing of "Hound Dog", the Court voided Leiber and Stoller's contract, ordered Otis to pay the legal costs of the defendants, and awarded 46.25% of the song to Leiber and Stoller, with Lion Music receiving 28.75% and Elvis Presley Music receiving the final 25%.

Despite the Court's findings, Otis continued to claim that he wrote the third verse and rewrote some of the lyrics in the second verse—including adding "You made me feel so bad. You make me weep and moan. You ain't looking for a woman. You're looking for a home"—and edited out what he described later as "derogatory crap". In 2000, Otis claimed: "Leiber and Stoller brought me the song, 'Hound Dog,'" Otis recalls, of the time he produced Big Mama Thornton's recording of what was to become an R&B, and then rock 'n' roll, classic. "Parts of it weren't really acceptable. I didn't like that reference to chicken and watermelon, said 'Let's get that crap out of there.' ... This came out and was a big smash, and everything was all right. I had half the publishing rights and one third of the song-writing. Then Elvis Presley made it a mega hit, and they got greedy. They sued me in court. They won, they beat me out of it. I could have sent my kids to college, like they sent theirs," Otis said. "But, oh well, if I dwell on that I get quite unhappy, so we try to move on." However, Leiber and Stoller maintained consistently and emphatically that Otis was "not a writer of the song" (emphasis theirs).

As he had provided lyrics for the version of "Hound Dog" recorded by Presley, Freddie Bell "sued to get some of the composer royalties because he had changed the words and indeed the song, and he would have made millions as the songwriter of Elvis' version: but he lost because he did not ask Leiber & Stoller for permission" to make those changes.

Broadcast Music, Incorporated (BMI) is the performing rights organization for "Hound Dog" (BMI Work #94632, ISWC # T-905246869-6), while Sony/ATV SONGS LLC owns the publishing rights.

== In popular culture ==
- The song was included in the 1996 stage musical, Hound Dog: A Hip hOpera, a musical send-up that was written, and produced by Jeff Rake, that ran for three months at Hollywood's Hudson Theatre, receiving five LA Weekly Theatre Award nominations, including Musical of the Year.
- In 2022 Big Mama Thornton was featured as a character in Elvis, a biopic about Elvis Presley. In the movie, Thornton (played by Shonka Dukureh in her only film role, as she died shortly after the film's release) is shown as the original singer of the song "Hound Dog" and appears in the movie singing the song. Presley (played by Austin Butler) hears Thornton sing the song at a concert and decides to record a cover version. Dukureh's performance of "Hound Dog" is included in full on the movie soundtrack.
- The AGM-28 Hound Dog missile's name is inspired by Presley's version of the song. The missiles were air-launched supersonic missiles designed to destroy heavily defended ground targets. Almost 700 AGM-28s were built.

== Discography ==
=== Willie Mae "Big Mama" Thornton ===
- with Kansas City Bill and Orchestra "Hound Dog" / "Night Mare" (US: February 1953; Peacock 1612) (UK: 1954; Vogue V 2284) (Sweden, 1954; Karusell K 66) (France, 1954: Vogue V 3328) Song is credited to Leiber-Stroller [sic]-Otis.
- with Kansas City Bill and Orchestra "Hound Dog" / "Rock-a-Bye Baby" (US: August 1956; Peacock 5–1612)
- with Kansas City Bill and Orchestra "Hound Dog" / "Rock-a-Bye Baby" (Aust & NZ: 1956; Prestige PSP-1004) Song is credited to Robey-Thornton-Leiber-Stoller.
- The Big Ones From Duke and Peacock Records (US: 1967; Peacock Records PLP-2000) Various Artists
- "Hound Dog" / "Let's Go Get Started" (1969: Mercury Records 72981)
- She's Back (1970: Back Beat Records BLP-68) Reissued: (1974: ABC/Back Beat BBLX-68).
- Hound Dog: The Peacock Recordings (1992: Peacock MCAD-10668)

=== Freddie Bell and the Bellboys ===
- "Hound Dog" (Leibler-Stoller) (2:45) / "Move Me Baby"(1955: Teen 101). This version is slower and includes "arf arf" sounds. * (2:20) (Leiber-Stoller-* "Hound Dog" (Leiber-Stoller-Otis) (2:20) Rock'n'Roll Vol. 1 (UK: 1956: Barclay 14159 EP) (France: Mercury 14159)
- "Hound Dog" (Leiber-Stoller-Otis) (2:20) / "Big Bad Wolf" (1957: Mercury Records 45152) (Australia: July 1957; Mercury 45152)
- "Hound Dog"Rock 'N' Roll Vol. 2 (Sweden: 1957; Mercury EP-1-3502) (Norway: 1957; Mercury EP MN5)
- "Hound Dog"(Leiber-Stoller)Rock´n Roll All Flavors (1957: Mercury MG 20289)

=== Elvis Presley ===
- Elvis: The First Live Recordings: These are recordings from the Louisiana Hayride radio show from 1955 and 1956. (1982: Music Works PB 3601)
- "Hound Dog" / "Don't Be Cruel" (Recorded: July 2, 1956; Released: July 13, 1956: RCA Victor 47–6604) (Canada: July 13, 1956; RCA Victor 20–6604) (Germany: August 4, 1956; RCA 20–6604; 47–6604) (UK: September 1956; His Master's Voice POP 249) (Belgium: September 1956; 47–6604) (Australia: 1956; RCA 10186) (Italy, 1956: RCA Italiana 45N 0515) "Perro De Caza (Hound Dog)" (Spain: 1957; RCA 3–10052) (Japan: August 1962; Victor SS-1297)

=== Cover versions ===
==== Thornton version ====
- Little Esther (Recorded: March 11, 1953; Released: April 1953: Federal 12126)
- Jack Turner and His Granger County Gang (Recorded: March 20, 1953; Released: April 4, 1953: RCA Victor 47–5267), who was actually Henry D. Haynes on vocals, with his Homer and Jethro partner Kenneth C. Burns on mandolin, with Chet Atkins on lead guitar, Charles Green on bass, and Jerry Byrd on steel guitar.
- de:Billy Starr (Recorded: November 1952; released: April 4, 1953: 78pm: IF-452; Imperial 45–8186)
- Betsy Gay (Recorded: March 18, 1953; Released: April 11, 1953: Intro Records 45–6070) (w/ Joe Maphis and Merle Travis).
- Eddie Hazlewood (April 11, 1953: Intro Records 45–6069)
- Tommy Duncan and the Miller Bros. (April 18, 1953: Intro Records 45–6071)
- Cleve Jackson [Jackson Cleveland Toombs] and His Hound Dogs (1953: Herald H-1015) on Various Artists, Chicago Rock (Netherlands: 1974; Redita [1st series] 108) Various Artists Boppin' Hillbilly, Vol. 5 (Netherlands: 1989; White Label WLP2805)
- The Cozy Cole All Stars (William Randolph Cole) "Hound Dog Special" (Recorded: February 24, 1954: MGM 11794) "A spend off [sic] of Willie Mae Thornton's" version. (instrumental)
- The Dirty Blues Band Dirty Blues Band (1967: BluesWay 6010) (1968: BluesWay 45–61016) Modified Thornton version
- James Booker Classified (1982: Demon)
- Susan Tedeschi Better Days (1995)
- Etta James Matriarch of the Blues (2000: Private Music)
- Robert Palmer Drive (2003)
- Macy Gray Various Artists Lightning In a Bottle: A One Night History of the Blues (Recorded live at Radio City Music Hall in New York City; 2004 DVD directed by Antoine Fuqua)

==== Presley version ====
- Gene Vincent and His Blue Caps (Recorded: 1956; Released: 2004; Norton 45–114) The Capitol Years '56–'63 (Recorded 1956; Released: 1987: Charly Records BOX 108)
- Hoosier Hot Shots Hoosier Hot Shots (Recorded & released: 1957; Tops Records L1541)). Novelty version.
- Jerry Lee Lewis Whole Lotta' Shakin' Goin' On (recorded at Sun Studios February 14, 1958) Whole Lotta' Shakin' Goin' On: Where Rock Began (1977: Gusto GT-103) (1992: Dragon Street 7822) The Greatest Live Show On Earth (Recorded live in Birmingham, Alabama, on July 1, 1964; December 1964, #71: Smash Records MGS 27056/SRS 67056)
- Chubby Checker For Twisters Only (Recorded 1960; Released: December 1961, #8: Parkway P-7002) Your Twist Party (December 1961, #2; Parkway P-7007)
- Dickie Valentine (UK: 1962) Live In Concert (UK: June 12, 2012; Record label: Master Classics Records) Comedy version featuring Valentine singing the song, then reciting it as Mr. Magoo and Edward G. Robinson
- Pat Boone Sings Guess Who? (September 1963: Dot Records DLP-3501/25501)
- Sammy Davis Jr. Sammy Davis Jr. at the Coconut Grove (Recorded: 1963 at the Coconut Grove) (part of a medley with "What'd I Say")
- Betty Everett You're No Good (Retitled: It's in His Kiss (Shoop Shoop)) (December 1963: Vee-Jay Records VJS-1077) I Need You So (1968: Sunset Records SUS-5220)
- Little Richard Little Richard Is Back (And There's A Whole Lotta Shakin' Goin' On!) (June 1964: Vee-Jay Records VJS-1107)
- The Surfaris Fun City, U.S.A. (US: 1964; Decca 4560)(UK: 1964; Brunswick)
- The Everly Brothers Rock n Soul album (Recorded December 1, 1964; Released March 1965: Warner Bros. W/WS 1578)
- Junior Wells Hoodoo Man Blues (September 22, 1965: Delmark Records DS 9613)
- The Mothers of Invention 'Tis the Season to Be Jelly – Live in Sweden (Recorded September 30, 1967) in Beat the Boots set (July 1991: Rhino/Foo-eee label R2 70542)
- Jimi Hendrix featured on the live album BBC Sessions (Recorded: 1967; Released: 1998)
- Vanilla Fudge The Beat Goes On (February 1968; Atco Records 33-237)
- Van Morrison Live at Pacific High Studios (1971) Bootleg
- Conway Twitty Conway Twitty Sings the Blues (1972: MGM Records SE-4837)
- Jimi Hendrix & Little Richard on the album Friends From The Beginning (1972)
- John Lennon performed by Lennon and the Plastic Ono Elephant's Memory Band on August 30, 1972, at Madison Square Garden, New York City, from one of his last charity concerts. Released on Live in New York (US: January 24, 1986: UK: February 24, 1986: Parlophone PCS 7301)
- John Entwistle Rigor Mortis Sets In (Recorded: 1973; Released: 1973 on Track Records)
- Scorpions Tokyo Tapes (Recorded: 1978; Released: 1978 on RCA Records)
- Carl Perkins (UK: 1985; Magnum Force MFLP-2.039)
- The Residents The King & Eye (1989 on Rykodisc)
- Eric Clapton (Germany: 1989; Reprise 5439-19719-7) Journeyman (November 1989: Duck Records 7599-2 6074–1) (1990: Warner Bros. 19848)
- Tiny Tim : Tiny Tim Rock (1993; Regular Records D 31093)
- David Grisman, John Hartford, and Mike Seeger "Hound Dawg" on Retrograss (1999: Acoustic Disc); Nominated for a Grammy Award in the Traditional Folk Album category in 2000.
- James Taylor Covers (2008)

=== Answers and parodies ===
- Charlie Gore & Louis Innis "(You Ain't Nothin but a Female) Hound Dog" (March 22, 1953: King 3587)
- Homer and Jethro "(How Much Is) That Hound Dog In The Window?" (Bob Merrill) (March 1953: RCA Victor 47–5280)
- Roy Brown and His Mighty, Mighty Men "Mr. Hound Dog's in Town" (March 1953: King Records 45–4627)
- John Brim "Rattlesnake" (1953: Checker 769)
- Chuck Higgins and His Mellotones (vocal by "Daddy Cleanhead") "Real Gone Hound Dog" (written by C. Higgins & V. Haven) (1953: Combo 25)
- Smiley Lewis "Play Girl" (D. Bartholomew) (1953: Imperial 45–5234)
- Rufus "Hound Dog" Thomas, Jr. "Bear Cat (The Answer To Hound Dog)" (March 1953: Sun Records 181)
- Unknown (attributed to Rosco Gordon) "(You Ain't Nuttin' But a) Juicehead" (Probably March 1953: unreleased demo recorded at Sun Records) On Various Artists "706 Blues": A Collection of Rare Memphis Blues (Netherlands, 1974: Redita LP-111) On Various Artists (Netherlands 1988: Keep On Rolling (Redita 131) Various Artists Sun Records: The Blues Years 1950–1958 (1996: Charly CDSUNBOX 7)
- Juanita Moore and the Eugene Jackson Trio "Call Me a Hound Dog" (Robert Geddins) on Various Artists Toast of the Coast: 1950s R&B from Dolphin's of Hollywood, Vol. 2 (Recorded ca. 1953; Released: UK: March 10, 2009: Ace)
- Frank "Dual Trumpeter" Motley & His Crew (with vocal by Curley Bridges) "New Hound Dog" (1954: Big Town 116)
- Big "Tiny" Kennedy [Jesse Kennedy, Jr.] and His Orchestra "Country Boy" (Tiny Kennedy) (October 1955: Groove 4G-0106) Re-released 2011: Juke Box Jam JBJ 1025)
- Homer and Jethro "Houn' Dawg" (November 10, 1956: RCA Victor 20–6706; 47–6706)
- Lalo "Pancho Lopez" Guerrero "Pound Dog" (1956: L&M LM1002)
- Cliff Johnson "Go 'Way Hound Dog (Let Me Sing My Blues)" (1956: Columbia 4-40865; Australia: 1957; Coronet Records KW-022)
- Mickey Katz and His Orchestra "You're A Doity Dog (Hound Dog)" (January 1957; Capitol F3607) (Germany: 1957; Capitol F 80 411)
- Johnny Madera "Too Many Hound Dogs" (Bob Crewe, Frank Slay) (November 1960: Swan Records 4063)
- The Raging Storms "Hound Dog [Twist]" (Fred Kelly) December 1961: Warwick Records M677; Trans Atlas M677
- El Vez and The Memphis Mariachis (as "(You Ain't Nothin' But a) Chihuahua") (1991) Son of a Lad From Spain? (December 14, 1999: Sympathy 4 the R.I.)

== See also ==
- List of best-selling singles
- List of best-selling singles in the United States
- List of number-one singles of 1956 (U.S.)
- List of number-one rhythm and blues hits of 1956
- Groove Records
