= Frank Musker =

British songwriter and composer (born 1951)

Frank John Musker (born 1951) is a British songwriter and composer. Most prolific in the 1980s and 1990s, he worked with artists such as Sheena Easton, the Babys, Robert Miles, Jennifer Rush, Bucks Fizz, Air Supply, Lucio Battisti, Zucchero, Lisa Stansfield and Brian May (for the Queen song "Too Much Love Will Kill You"). His collaboration with May was awarded Best Song Musically and Lyrically at the 1997 Ivor Novello Awards.

One of Musker's earlier successes was the 1977 North American hit "Heaven on the 7th Floor", written with co-writer Dominic Bugatti. It became a hit for Paul Nicholas and The Mighty Pope. Musker and Bugatti then collaborated with John Waite, frontman for the Babys at the time, to compose "Back on My Feet Again", which would become the Babys' last top 40 hit, peaking at No. 33 in 1980. Two years later, Musker and Bugatti recorded a number of singles, and an album, under the name The Dukes. The album was produced by Arif Mardin and recorded and mixed by Gary Skardina at the Music Grinder Studios (Hollywood, California), Chelsea Sound and Atlantic Studios (New York), Maison Rouge, and Odyssey Studios (London).

In 1984, Musker, as a solo artist, recorded the song "Steely Man", which was featured in the comedy film Grandview, U.S.A. and also released as a single.

In 1998, Musker was a director at the British Academy of Songwriters, Composers and Authors.
