= The Dukes (British duo) =

British disco band

- Genres: Blue-eyed soul
- Years active: 1981–82
- Labels: WEA
- Past members: Dominic Bugatti; Frank Musker

The Dukes was the recording name for the songwriting duo Dominic Bugatti and Frank Musker.

== History ==
The duo had had some success as songwriters, their first recording together - as Bugatti & Musker - being "Dancing with the Captain", which became their first UK top ten single as writers, albeit via the Paul Nicholas cover version.

In 1981, they cut their first recording, "Mystery Girl", under the name the Dukes. It entered the chart for the week ending 17 October 1981, and peaked at No. 47 a month later. Despite not making the top 40, the duo performed the song on Top of the Pops on 5 November 1981, with backing musicians including Richard Darbyshire. The duo's actual backing musicians on their recordings were session musicians in Los Angeles, where the duo had moved as the British market had moved towards acts writing their own materials.

A follow-up single, "Thank You for the Party", peaked at No. 53 the following year. The third Dukes release, "I'm a Survivor", missed the charts, as did the duo's album (confusingly titled The Dukes – Bugatti & Musker), and they retired the Dukes name.
