= The Mighty Pope =

Jamaican-Canadian singer (born 1945)

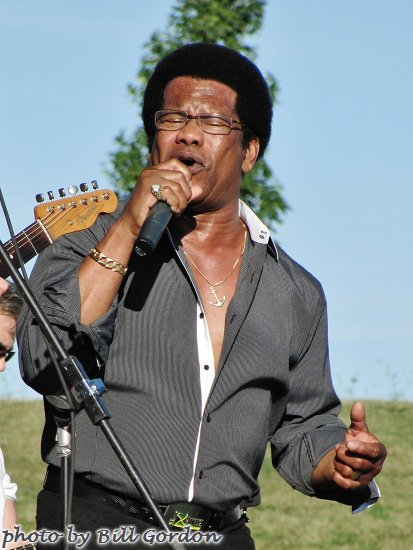
- The Mighty Pope, May 2014

Background information
- Born: Earle Heedram; October 23, 1945 (age 80); Lucea, Jamaica
- Origin: Toronto, Ontario, Canada

The Mighty Pope (born Earle Heedram; October 23, 1945) is a Jamaican-Canadian singer.

Known for his vocal strength (hence the "Mighty" prefix in his stage handle) and sharp visual presentation (custom tailored suits, shirts, capes, and footwear), he was marketed as a something of a "sex symbol" at the height of his recording career in the mid-to-late 1970s.

== Early years ==
Pope (who received his nickname via a Vatican-shaped plot of land his father owned in their native Lucea, Jamaica) came to Canada in 1965 and after adjusting to the culture shock of his new surroundings (people, transportation, architecture, food, weather, media/advertising), wasted no time in immersing himself into the heart of Ontario's growing Jamaican musical landscape. Due to immigration reforms and the 1955-1960 West Indian Domestic Scheme, by the mid-sixties, Canada's Jamaican population was expanding significantly and there were already a handful of clubs (Club Jamaica, W.I.F. Club, Club Trinidad, etc.) catering to those immigrants who wished to celebrate their native culture through music, social events, and food. Although Pope had only seen fairly limited performing experience in his native Jamaica (performing with Byron Lee as well as other regional musicians on the local talent show scene), he quickly became the R&B commodity on Toronto's Yonge Street strip (Hawk's Nest, Le C'oq D'or) after reinvigorating The Sheiks, the house band at Club Jamaica (located where Eaton Centre now exists, managed by Mr. Fritz Riley), as lead singer.

== The Sheiks ==
In 1964, The Sheiks (including vocalists Jackie Opel, Lynval "Eddie", Spencer, and singing MC Bobby Rousseau) appear to have been the first group of non-folk playing West Indian musicians to relocate to Canada en masse, initially to promote the indigenous Jamaican sound of ska. The group decided to stay in Toronto, seeing potential musical work opportunities in Canada, though Studio One vocalist Opel did return to Jamaica after his first taste of the Canadian winter. After Spencer's departure from the group to perform as a solo artist (where he saw early breakout success), the outfit was in dire straits. Pope's arrival on the scene in 1966 reignited the band and within the year, they were cutting their debut Canadian recording. With Pope singing lead, The Sheiks cut one R&B/soul single for their backer Larry Wiener, who in 1967 arranged for it to be released on the Toronto-based independent Raymond Records label. "Eternal Love" (b/w "Centennial Swing", an instrumental) was included on Seattle-based Light In The Attic Records' 2006 compilation, Jamaica To Toronto: Soul Funk & Reggae 1967–1974).

== The Hitch-Hikers ==
Along with Sheiks guitarist/co-songwriter Rupert "Valentine" Bent and Studio One drummer Joe Isaacs, Pope was soon courted by American-born Rock and Roll legend Frank Motley (an innovator in the transition of jump blues to rhythm & blues during the 50s with his dual trumpet technique) to front his Hitch-Hikers combo (another mainstay of Toronto's R&B community) replacing the popular singer Jackie Shane. The Pope-fronted Hitch-Hikers kept a very active performance pace with constant dates all over Ontario and Quebec (routes already traveled by the Pope-fronted Sheiks). Recording their debut LP in 1970 with the Canadian Paragon label, "The Hitch-Hikers featuring The Mighty Pope" combined a mix of Pope and Bent-penned originals and tough R&B/funk covers by the likes of Eddie Bo and The Meters. With no industry or much promotional support, the disc sank. After a series of line-up changes with The Hitch-Hikers (seeing Motley, Bent exit and the addition of Jamaican-Canadians Wayne McGhie on guitar and Jimmy Carver on keyboards and one-time Skatalites trumpet player, Johnny "Dizzy" Moore), the band released one more single, "Mr. Fortune" on Larry Wiener's Heart label before packing it in for good.

== Solo career ==
After fronting minor combos Ram (one 45 for the Tuesday label, "Love Is The Answer", which also appeared on the "Jamaica to Toronto" compilation) and the Wild Oats (unrecorded), Pope eventually went solo and saw greater commercial success. Thanks to non-stop touring, Pope continued to gain recognition and adoration. By the mid-seventies, his dynamic stage act caught the attention of management and subsequently RCA Records Canada, who released his self-titled The Mighty Pope soul LP in 1977. It contained the single, "Heaven On The 7th Floor," a #14 hit single in Canada. Harry Hinde (Tundra, Charity Brown, Shania Twain) produced the disc with arrangements from Eric Robertson (The Majestics, Moe Koffman, Roger Whittaker) and most impressively, Motown and Detroit music legend David Van De Pitte (Marvin Gaye's "What's Going On" to name but one). Four 7" singles from the long player were released altogether. "Heaven On The Seventh Floor" broke the Canadian Top 20, while "If You Want A Love Affair" received worship from the UK's dance-fuelled Northern Soul scene. "Heaven on the 7th Floor" was covered by The Mighty Pope, and charted concurrently with Paul Nicholas's version. In Canada, his version was the bigger hit. It was issued by RCA Records on the Private Stock label, and reached #14. It also reached number 83 on the U.S. Cash Box chart.[12]

In 1978, Pope signed with Quality Records after sessions for a second RCA album were aborted (unreleased demos were recorded in Detroit throughout 1978 with Van De Pitte). New producer John Driscoll surrounded Pope with top-notch talent for his next recording project, among them Italian-Canadian disco icon Gino Soccio, for his second solo album, Sway. It was reported in the 25 August 1979 issue of RPM Weekly that Quality Records had a quantity of albums to release in the fall. At the top of the list was Mighty Pope's debut album Sway. The album quickly shot up the club charts worldwide and was additionally picked up for American release by RFC Records. The first 12" single was a remake of the Bobby Rydell's 1960 hit "Sway" followed by dance floor smash "Sweet Blindness". Both songs were remixed by Jim Burgess and scored Top 40 placement on the U.S. disco charts assisted by promotional tours to Studio 54, national TV, media, and extended cross-Canadian touring.

With changing musical tides, Pope's induction to the world of disco was short-lived and by the early 80s, RFC Records had folded. Still, Pope continued to perform soul, R&B, and pop in bars and clubs across Canada until the early 90s when he decided to retire from the business and focus on family. With his musical career revived by 2006's Jamaica To Toronto archival reissue project, Pope was soon performing in Toronto, Montreal, Calgary, and Vancouver to receptive audiences.
