= Heaven on the 7th Floor =

1977 hit single by British singer Paul Nicholas

- Side A of the UK single

Single by Paul Nicholas

from the album Paul Nicholas
- B-side: "Do You Want My Love"
- Released: August 1977
- Recorded: 1977
- Genre: Pop, disco
- Length: 2:44
- Label: RSO
- Songwriters: Dominic Bugatti, Frank Musker
- Producer: Christopher Neil

Paul Nicholas singles chronology
"Grandma's Party" (1976)	"Heaven on the 7th Floor" (1977)	"On the Strip" (1978)

"Heaven on the 7th Floor" is a pop song that became a 1977 hit single for British singer Paul Nicholas. It was his biggest U.S. hit, a track from his eponymous debut LP. The song spent three weeks at number 6 on the U.S. Billboard Hot 100 during November and December of that year. "Heaven on the 7th Floor" became a gold record. It also reached number 49 in Canada.

The song was not among Nicholas' most popular hits in Britain, although it was a top 10 hit in other nations. On the 22 October 1977 American Top 40 radio program, Casey Kasem described Nicholas as "a performer who didn't want to be there," i.e., on the musical charts. Having had a successful film career in Europe for 10 years, he had come to America to audition for a stage production of Hamlet, however, he was not selected. Nicholas felt that musical success might help him make more of a name for himself, and would open a door for him into bigger acting roles. Kasem said of this strategy, "He makes the music industry sound easier than it really is."

The song was written by Dominic Bugatti and Frank Musker. Backing vocals on the Nicholas version quote a small portion of the Irving Berlin standard "Cheek to Cheek."

== Chart performance ==
=== Paul Nicholas version ===
Weekly charts (1977–78)	Peak position
Australia (Kent Music Report)	41
Canada RPM Top Singles	49
New Zealand (RIANZ)	1
UK	40
U.S. Billboard Hot 100	6
U.S. Billboard Adult Contemporary	23
U.S. Cash Box Top 100	5

Year-end charts (1977)	Rank
New Zealand	19
U.S. (Joel Whitburn's Pop Annual)	59
U.S. Cash Box	70

== The Mighty Pope version ==
"Heaven on the 7th Floor"

Single by The Mighty Pope
- Released: August 1977
- Length: 2:45
- Label: Private Stock Records
- Songwriters: Dominic Bugatti, Frank Musker

"Heaven on the 7th Floor" was covered by the Mighty Pope, and charted concurrently with Nicholas' version. In Canada, the Mighty Pope's version was the bigger hit. It was issued by RCA Records on the Private Stock label, and reached #14. It also reached number 83 on the U.S. Cash Box chart.

Weekly charts (1977)	Peak position
Canadian RPM Top Singles	14
U.S. Cash Box Top 100	83

Year-end chart (1977)	Rank
Canadian RPM Top Singles	130

== See also ==
- List of 1970s one-hit wonders in the United States
