= S.I.R. John Winston Ono Lennon =

Studio album (bootleg) by John Lennon, Yoko Ono, Elephant's Memory
- Released: 1995
- Recorded: 18–22 August 1972, SIR Studios, Butterfly Studio and Fillmore East, New York
- Genre: Pop rock
- Length: 60:29
- Label: Moonlight Records; ML 9506
- Producer: Phil Spector

S.I.R. John Winston Ono Lennon is a bootleg album of rehearsals before a concert of British musician John Lennon and his wife Yoko Ono, recorded in studio in late August 1972.

The show would be carried out later in Madison Square Garden with the rock band Elephant's Memory, as part of his two charities concerts "One to One," made just over a week after these recordings.

== Recordings ==
The sessions were with record producer Phil Spector, mostly between 21 and 22 August 1972 at Studio Instrument Rentals (SIR Studios), a room in Manhattan, New York, which began operations late this year. The album title is an obvious pun between this name studio and the British honorary title of "Sir," although Lennon himself was never entitled to use it.

The only exceptions were "Honey Hush" and the "jam session" by Yoko Ono, recorded on 18 August at the Butterfly Studio and 20 and 22 August at the Fillmore East theatre, both venues in the same city. These last sessions have a sound quality significantly of lower quality.

As usual in this type of unofficial recordings, the audio is not optimal from the original tape and was one of the main reasons why it never was released at the time. The rehearsals were published in 1995 on CD by the Italian label Moonlight Records, that acquired the rights to use this recordings.

Along with A Toot and a Snore in '74, this is one of the bootlegs of rehearsals by John Lennon lesser known, and never included in compilations.

== Context ==
Rehearsals were recorded in a time when John Lennon's career began to take radically a different turn after his peak period as a political activist (see Bed-In and Bagism).

The change in musical direction came amid several problems: the commercial failure of his controversial album Some Time in New York City (released just two months ago), including the various geo-political events that shook the world in 1972 and finally, there was an artist's stated desire to return to his usual rock and roll music. After nearly two years of trying to shape the project, Lennon would make it culminated in 1975 with the release of his album Rock 'n' Roll, but only included his version of ""Ain't That a Shame," from the tested songs in 1972. In an interview in 1975, Lennon said this about Rock 'n' Roll: "It started in '73 with Phil," but never said nothing about his rehearsals in SIR Studios, one year before.

It's not very clear that these recordings were originated directly for the concert on 30 August 1972 at Madison Square Garden (which was filmed and released under the name Live in New York City until 1986), because it has very few the songs performed on the show: only was performed "Come Together" and "Hound Dog." Lennon probably only would consider possible songs for future recordings in the studio, without being certain of what is going to play in the upcoming concert.

This CD consists primarily of classic songs from rock and roll and the only one Lennon song "Come Together." The songs credited to Yoko Ono is some blues rock improvisations with spontaneous screaming from her. "We're All Water" is an Ono song included in Some Time in New York City.

The editing eliminated much of the dialogue between John and the band, focusing on the interpretation of the songs.

== Historical significance ==
Despite the poor quality sound of this tapes, it is one of the rare occasions of recording John Lennon from his position "live in the studio" in his solo career.

Additional importance is that almost all these songs were never played live, thus being the only known recording of these songs from him. Lennon never staged a concert tour during his post Beatles career.

== Track listing ==
1. "Roll Over Beethoven" (Chuck Berry) – 2:30
2. "Honey Don't" (Carl Perkins) – 3:05
3. "Ain't That a Shame" (Fats Domino/Dave Bartholomew) – 2:34
4. Medley: "My Babe" (Little Walter) and "Not Fade Away" (Charles Hardin/Norman Petty) – 2:30
5. "Send Me Some Lovin'" (Richard Penniman) – 2:49
6. "Yoko Jam" (Yoko Ono) – 2:21
7. Medley: "Whole Lotta Shakin' Goin' On" (Dave "Curlee" Williams/James Faye "Roy" Hall) and "It'll Be Me" (Jack Clement) – 5:29
8. "Honey Hush" (Big Joe Turner) – 2:13
9. Medley: "Don't Be Cruel" (Otis Blackwell) and "Hound Dog" (Jerry Leiber/Mike Stoller) – 4:27
10. "Caribbean" (Mitchell Torok) – 3:09
11. "Honky Tonk" (Bill Doggett) – 3:11
12. "Mind Train" (Ono) – 8:07
13. "Come Together" (Lennon–McCartney) – 7:00
14. "We're All Water" (Ono) – 11:04

== Personnel ==
- John Lennon – vocals, rhythm guitar, keyboards
- Yoko Ono – keyboards
- Jim Keltner – drums

Elephant's Memory:

- Wayne 'Tex' Gabriel – lead guitar
- Gary Van Scyoc – bass guitar
- John Ward – bass guitar
- Stan Bronstein – saxophone
- Adam Ippolito – keyboards
- Richard Frank Jr. – drums
