= Frank Motley =

American jazz musician

Frank Motley, Jr. (December 30, 1923 – May 31, 1998) was an American R&B and jazz musician and bandleader who worked in Canada for much of his career. His main instrument was the trumpet, on which he was known for playing two simultaneously. He also sang.

== Biography ==
Born in Cheraw, South Carolina, Motley took trumpet lessons when young from Dizzy Gillespie, who was from the same town. He developed a technique of playing two trumpets at the same time, becoming known as "Dual Trumpet" and "Two Horn" Motley. He took a degree in mechanical engineering at South Carolina State College, before joining the military and performing in the Navy Band entertaining troops in the Pacific. After the end of the war he played in nightclubs in New York City before settling in Washington, D.C. and forming his own band in 1949.

He recorded extensively for Lillian Claiborne's DC Records from 1951, and many of his recordings were licensed to other labels including RCA Victor and Specialty. His band, the Motley Crew, included singer and keyboardist Curley Bridges, drummer Thomas E. ‘TNT’ Tribble, and vocalist Elsie "Angel Face" Kenley (1930–1991). From 1952, Motley played mainly in Canada, marrying and moving to Toronto in 1955. However, he also continued to perform and record in the US. His biggest commercial success came in 1963, when his version of William Bell's song "Any Other Way", which he recorded with vocalist Jackie Shane for a small label in Boston, became a regional hit, rising to number 2 on the local Toronto pop chart.

He disbanded the Motley Crew in 1966 and formed a new band in Toronto, the Hitch-Hikers, at first with Shane and then with singer Earle "The Mighty Pope" Heedram. The band broke up in 1970. Motley continued to perform with another new band, the Bridge Crossings, until the mid 1980s. In declining health, Motley then retired to live in Durham, North Carolina, but continued to play in local dance bands.

He died in Durham in 1998, aged 74.
