= Daddy Cleanhead =

American singer

Fred Higgins (died 1960s), known as Daddy Cleanhead, was an American singer. He was known for singing "Something's Goin' On In My Room" (1954). Gary Susman of The Boston Phoenix describes the record an "obscure gem".

He was the older brother of Chuck Higgins and regularly sang vocals with his brother's band.

He was recorded with them on the following singles

- "Broke" / "I'll Be There" (1954)
- "One More Time" / "Dye Ooh Mambo" (1954)
- "Papa Charlie" (1954)
- "Something's Goin' On In My Room" / "Let Me Come Back Home" (1955) Specialty Records
- "Shotgun Wedding"

and on the following songs from albums

- Big Fat Mama (1974)
- Papa Charlie (2006)
- Real Gone Hound Dog (2006)

and is included in the compilation

- Cool Daddy—The Central Avenue Scene 1951-1957, Vol.3
