= Jackie Shane =

American singer (1940–2019)

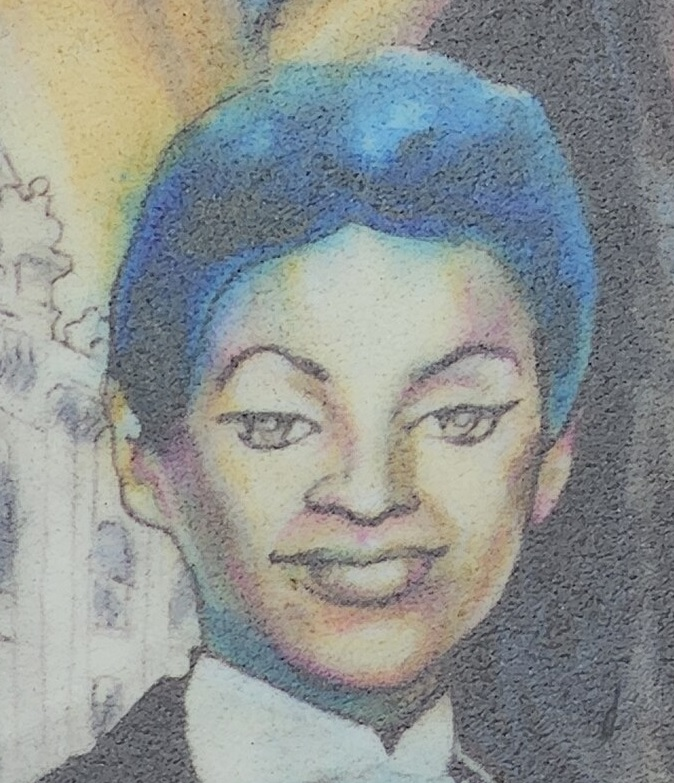
- Jackie Shane as depicted on the Yonge Street, Toronto mural: 'the History of Music'.

Background information
- Born: May 15, 1940; Nashville, Tennessee, U.S.
- Died: February 21, 2019 (aged 78) Nashville, Tennessee, U.S.
- Genres: R&B, soul
- Occupation: Singer

External videos
- Jackie Shane - Walking The Dog - 1965 R&B

Jackie Shane (May 15, 1940 – February 21, 2019) was an American soul and rhythm and blues singer, who was prominent in the music scene of Toronto, Ontario, Canada in the 1960s. Considered to be a pioneer transgender performer, she was a contributor to the Toronto Sound and is best known for the single "Any Other Way", which was a regional Top 10 hit in Toronto in 1963 and a modest national chart hit across Canada in 1967, reaching No. 68.

== Early life ==
Born on May 15, 1940 in Nashville, Tennessee, Jackie Shane knew that she was different from other children her age. Femininity was one of the ways that Shane expressed herself, wearing dresses and makeup and growing out her hair. Shane also mimicked mannerisms and posture cues from popular actress Mae West. Shane's aunt and grandmother both accepted and supported Shane through her early self-discovery.

It was easier for Shane to associate with her femininity and receive support from close family, but there was still judgment from peers and adults. While Shane describes that there were very few conflicts at a young age, she does recall a young boy verbally accosting her while also throwing things at her; she then took a jump rope and whipped him.

Her grandmother's singing around the house had an influence on Shane's vocal development. Further encouragement from her grandmother allowed her to display her vocal talents as she progressed in age.

In 1958, she witnessed a group of white men chase a black man down near the bus stop where she and a friend were waiting. She witnessed this man violently beaten and then carelessly thrown into a dumpster nearby. This later influenced her decision to flee the Jim Crow South.

== Music career ==
Jackie Shane began her music career as a young teen, demonstrating vocal and rhythmic ability. This was noticed by Louis Lavelle, who recruited Shane and Les Monday to form a musical trio. They performed at a variety of small gigs, including at local fairgrounds and on radio stations. Initially a drummer as well as a vocalist, Shane would play drums standing up while singing. Shane's drumming talent led to studio session work as a drummer, including on Lillian Offitt's "Miss You So" in the summer of 1957. Working in Nashville regularly as a stage performer during the late 1950s, Shane also worked in the studio as a drummer on tracks by Larry Williams, Big Maybelle, Gatemouth Brown, Little Willie John, Joe Tex, and numerous other R&B performers. After gaining some recognition, Jackie Shane began to work with record labels, including Excello Records, while also drawing attention from Motown and Atlantic Records, but was not signed by big record labels.

Vowing to escape the Jim Crow South, in the late 1950s, Shane joined a traveling carnival and arrived in Cornwall, Ontario, in 1959. In 1960, Shane moved to Montreal, Quebec, where saxophonist "King" Herbert Whitaker invited her to watch Frank Motley and his Motley Crew at the Esquire Show Bar. At one point during the show, Motley and pianist Curley Bridges invited Shane, then still presenting as a man, onstage for the next set, where she performed songs by Ray Charles and Bobby "Blue" Bland.

She became band's lead vocalist and relocated to Toronto with them in late 1961. She returned several times to the United States, on tour with the Motley Crew, to New York to record, to visit her family and old friends and perform on a TV show in Nashville, and to live and work in Los Angeles where she played drums in recording sessions. Shane was friends with Little Richard when she lived in Nashville and played drums in his backing band on occasion.

=== Recording career ===
Shane recorded several tracks in 1960, including a cover of Barrett Strong's "Money (That's What I Want)" and a version of Lloyd Price's "I've Really Got the Blues". However, none of the tracks were issued at the time; they eventually came out in 1965.

Shane's first issued recording was "Any Other Way" (with the B-side "Sticks and Stones") in the fall of 1962; the song became her biggest chart hit, reaching No. 2 on Toronto's CHUM Chart in 1963. It was also a hit in the United States, allowing it to place at No. 124 on Billboard's Bubbling Under chart. The track was a cover of a William Bell song first released in summer 1962; Shane's version of "Any Other Way" was noted for adding a different spin to the lyric "Tell her that I'm happy/tell her that I'm gay", playing on the word's double meaning, which was not yet in mainstream usage.

The follow-up single to "Any Other Way" was "In My Tenement" (with the B-side "Comin' Down"). It received some airplay in upstate New York, but did not chart elsewhere in the US or Canada, and Shane did not record again for several years.

In 1962, Shane was performing at Toronto's Saphire Tavern, specializing in covers of songs by Ray Charles and Bobby Bland. In 1965, she made a television appearance in Nashville on WLAC-TV's Night Train, performing Rufus Thomas' "Walking the Dog". Around the same time, she was offered an appearance on The Ed Sullivan Show, but refused as the booking was made conditional on her presenting as male.

Also in 1965, the tracks from Shane's 1960 recording session were issued, but without Shane's prior knowledge. Two tracks appeared on a 1965 compilation LP entitled The Original Blues Sound Of Charles Brown & Amos Milburn With Jackie Shane - Bob Marshall & The Crystals, while two others (credited to "Little Jackie Shane") were issued as a single. Neither the single nor the album (both issued on small, obscure labels) received much attention.

In 1965, Gerry Lincoln, manager of the pop department at A&A Records, noticed that customers were coming in asking for "Any Other Way" even though it was no longer in print. A fan of Shane himself, he convinced Caravan Records to record Jackie Shane Live and wrote the liner notes.

In 1967, "Any Other Way" was reissued and became a semi-hit across Canada, peaking at No. 68 on the national RPM chart in March. Shane subsequently returned to recording later that year, issuing the studio single "Stand Up Straight and Tall" (with B-side "You Are My Sunshine"), which peaked at No. 87 on RPM, and the live album Jackie Shane Live. Two singles were also pulled from the live album (covers of "Knock On Wood" and "Don't Play That Song"), but none of the live material charted. A final studio single ("Cruel Cruel World" with B-side "New Way of Lovin'") was released in 1970 and also failed to chart.

In addition to her own recordings, Shane also appeared on Frank Motley's album Honkin' at Midnight, performing live versions of some of the singles she had released under her own name.

Shane faded in prominence after 1971, with even her own former bandmates losing touch with her; soon after returning to Los Angeles, she turned down an offer to be a part of George Clinton's band Funkadelic.

== Personal life ==
From the age of thirteen, Shane identified herself as a girl, but was consistently misgendered. Shane never publicly addressed her gender identity or sexual orientation until the last years of her life. She wore very feminine clothing during her performances, but her everyday clothes were considered more androgynous. Many at the time thought Shane resembled a masculine or butch lesbian, as she wore glittering suits on stage and wore her hair up.

Throughout her active musical career and for many years thereafter, Shane was written about by nearly all sources as a man who performed in clothing that strongly suggested femininity, with some sources directly labeling her as a drag queen. The few sources that sought out her own words on her gender were more ambiguous; she identified herself as male in two early quotes to the Toronto Star, but more often appeared to dodge questions about her gender altogether. Her identity as a trans woman was not confirmed on the record until music journalist Elio Iannacci interviewed her for The Globe and Mail in 2017.

According to filmmaker Lucah Rosenberg-Lee, who co-directed a documentary on Shane, "She identified as 'she' behind closed doors and to her aunt, who she regarded as her mother, and herself, but in the public eye there was no opportunity to do that, and no one would have understood."

Shane was known to be a flirtatious individual. She expressed to bandmates who flirted back with her that she had no personal interest in having any sexual relationships, yet they persisted. In one specific incident, a band member threatened Shane after she refused sexual advances, pulling a knife on her.

After her relocation to Canada in 1959, Shane found herself in conflict with the local mob. The mob was not welcoming to Shane and her bandmates and ended up kidnapping them. Her bandmates were sent back to the United States.

== Post-career ==
Shane left Toronto in 1971 to care for her aunt, Jessie Shane, who lived in Los Angeles. According to the documentary Any Other Way: The Jackie Shane Story, Shane returned to Nashville sometime in the late 1970s with her aunt to care for her biological mother and stepfather, both of whom were ailing.

For a time she was rumored to have died by suicide or to have been stabbed to death in the 1990s, but in fact she had retired from music, and moved home to Nashville from Los Angeles. She kept in touch with Frank Motley, who put a Toronto record collector in touch with her in the mid 1990s. This news was relayed to a small number of her old musician friends, a few of whom contacted her. One, Steve Kennedy, discussed with Shane the possibility of organizing and staging a reunion concert, but this never materialized; the next time Kennedy called the same phone number, it had been reassigned to somebody else who had never heard of Shane.

CBC Radio's Inside the Music aired a documentary feature, "I Got Mine: The Story of Jackie Shane", in 2010. At the time, nobody involved in the documentary, the executive producer of which was Steve Kennedy's wife, had been able to determine whether Shane was still alive. She was subsequently found still living in Nashville.

Footage of Shane in performance also appeared in Bruce McDonald's 2011 documentary television series Yonge Street: Toronto Rock & Roll Stories.

Jackie Shane Live was reissued as a bootleg in 2011 on Vintage Music as Live at the Saphire Tavern, although the reissue was inaccurately labelled as being from 1963. Several of the original songs covered in the set list had been released much later in the 1960s. A compilation bootleg of the studio singles and rarities, Soul Singles Classics, was released the same year. OPM subsequently reissued the album under its original title.

In 2015, the Polaris Music Prize committee shortlisted Jackie Shane Live as one of the nominees for the 1960s–1970s component of its inaugural Heritage Award to honour classic Canadian albums. It did not win, but has been renominated in subsequent years.

In 2017, a group of Toronto writers published the essay anthology Any Other Way: How Toronto Got Queer, a history of LGBTQ culture in Toronto; in addition to taking its title from Shane's 1962 single, the book includes an essay devoted specifically to Shane.

In the summer of 2017, the reissue label Numero Group announced that they would be releasing a double-LP/CD compilation of Shane's music, Any Other Way, on October 20, 2017. The album marked the first time since her final single in 1969 that Shane was directly involved in the production and release of a reissue of her music. It compiles her singles and recordings of her live. The album was nominated for a Grammy Award for Best Historical Album. In an interview with Elio Iannacci of The Globe and Mail, Shane stated she was planning to return to Toronto to perform live for the first time in nearly five decades.

In 2019, Shane granted a broadcast interview to CBC Radio One's Q. The interview was conducted by Elaine Banks, who had been the producer and host of "I Got Mine", and it was Shane's first broadcast interview since the end of her performing career. In the interview, she confirmed that she returned home to the United States to take care of her ailing aunt, but stated that she regretted not having chosen to bring her mother to Toronto instead.

== Death ==
Shane died in her sleep, at her home in Nashville, on February 21, 2019. Her death was reported to media the following day.

=== Posthumous recognition ===
In 2022, Shane was the subject of a Heritage Minute segment, in which she was portrayed by transgender activist Ravyn Wngz. The spot was directed by Pat Mills and Ayo Tsalithaba.

In 2023, a fundraising campaign was launched on JustGiving to fund a commemorative Heritage Toronto plaque honoring Shane, at a location to be determined in downtown Toronto. She had been previously featured in their 2021 Sounds Like Toronto digital exhibit. A plaque was unveiled on June 23, 2023, the start of Pride weekend in the city, at the Victoria and Richmond location of the former Saphire Tavern. A public mural on the side of a building on Yonge Street also includes a portrait of Shane as one of several images commemorating the street's live music scene of the 1960s.

In 2023, a GoFundMe campaign was launched by Nashville Queer History to purchase a historical marker honoring Jackie Shane that would be installed in Nashville, Tennessee. The marker was officially dedicated on September 20, 2024.

A documentary about her life, Any Other Way: The Jackie Shane Story, directed by Michael Mabbott and Lucah Rosenberg-Lee and executive produced by Elliot Page, premiered at South by Southwest in March 2024. As her death precluded the ability to record any new interviews for the film, and very little live action footage of Shane survives from the 1960s, the producers depict her in the film through the use of animation, generated by superimposing photos of Shane over rotoscoped footage of contemporary transgender drag performer Makayla Couture.

== Discography ==
=== Singles ===
- "Any Other Way" b/w "Sticks and Stones" (1962)
- "In My Tenement" b/w "Comin' Down" (1963)
- "Money (That's What I Want)" b/w "I've Really Got the Blues" (1965)
- "Stand Up Straight and Tall" b/w "You Are My Sunshine" (1967)
- "Knock On Wood" b/w "You're The One" (1967)
- "Don't Play That Song" b/w "Barefootin'" (1968)
- "Cruel Cruel World" b/w "New Way of Lovin'" (1970)

=== Albums ===
- Jackie Shane Live (Caravan Records, 1967)
- Honkin' at Midnight (2000, bootleg, with Frank Motley and his Motley Crew)
- Live at the Saphire Tavern (2011, bootleg)
- Soul Singles Classics (2011, bootleg)
- Jackie Shane Live (2015, reissue)

=== Compilations ===
- "Slave for You Baby" and "Chickadee" on The Original Blues Sound of Charles Brown & Amos Milburn with Jackie Shane-Bob Marshall & The Crystals (Grand Prix/Pickwick, 1965)
- Any Other Way (Numero Group, 2017)

== Sources ==
- Bowman, Rob (2017). Jackie Shane: Any Other Way. Numero Group.
