= Esquire Show Bar =

The Esquire Show Bar is an old jazz and rhythm and blues nightclub in Montreal, Quebec, Canada, popular during the 1950s, 1960s and 1970s, located in the city's downtown district at 1224 Rue Stanley. Esquire Show Bar was owned and run by Norman Silver.

Numerous international artists have performed there, including James Brown, Ray Charles, Aretha Franklin, Tina Turner, Otis Redding, Little Richard, Bo Diddley, Jackie Shane, Fats Domino, Wilson Pickett, B.B. King, Chubby Checker, Etta James, Joe Tex, Percy Sledge, Jackie Wilson, George Benson and the Avalons, James Cotton, Larry Coryell, Sonny Terry and Brownie McGhee. In the 1960s, bands such as those led by Duke Ellington, Count Basie, Lionel Hampton, drummer Buddy Rich and others played two-week gigs. As part of the deal, they would play dry matinees on Sunday afternoons. This enabled people under the age of 21 to attend.
