= Esquire Theatre (Cincinnati) =

Art-house theatre in Cincinnati

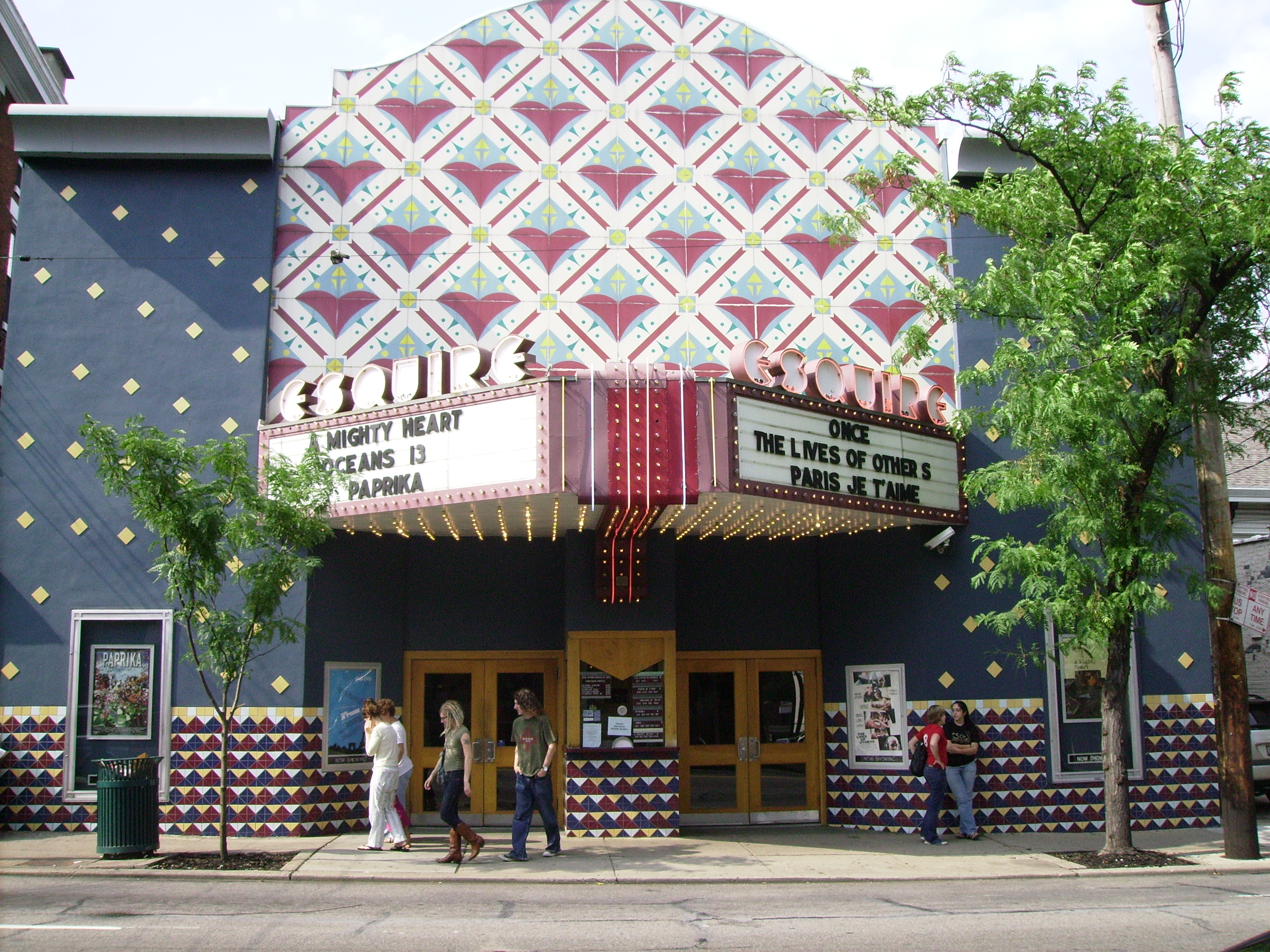
- Front view of the theatre
- Interactive map of Esquire Theatre
- Former names: The Clifton Opera House (1911-1915) Clifton Theatre (1915-1939)
- Address: 320 Ludlow Avenue; Cincinnati, Ohio
- Coordinates: 39°8′37.342″N 84°31′12.965″W

Construction
- Opened: 1911; 115 years ago
- Closed: October 25, 1983
- Reopened: April 20, 1990; 36 years ago

Website
- https://www.esquiretheatre.com/

Esquire Theatre, also known as The Esquire, is a movie theater located in the Clifton neighborhood of Cincinnati. They are known for their screenings of art films.

== History ==
=== Early History (1911-1927) ===
The Esquire originally opened as "The Clifton Opera House" in 1911. The theatre consisted of one screen, and screened silent films and occasionally hosted Vaudeville acts. In 1915, the theatre was renamed to "Clifton Theatre" and they began to exclusively screen movies. In 1927, the theatre began to screen movies with sound.

=== History as the Esquire (1939-1983) ===
The Clifton Theatre was renamed a final time on December 24, 1939. This time it was named "Esquire Theatre", a name the theatre retains to this day. The renaming was due to a takeover by Indianapolis based chain Marcus Enterprises.

By the 1960s, however, the theatre was struggling financially. In an attempt to draw more customers, they began to play low-budget and art films. In the 1980s the theatre faced competition from cable television, VCRs, and Multiplexs. This competition forced the theatre to close on October 25, 1983; its final showing was Romantic Comedy.

=== After the closure (1983-1986) ===
After the theatre shut down, the building sat empty for about a year. In 1984, restaurant developers planned to turn the building into a Wendy's restaurant. However, this plan was met with intense push-back from the local community. Residents believed that if developers were allowed to build the Wendy's it would "disrupt the village atmosphere" and allow other developers to gain a foothold in the neighborhood.

Due to this push-back, around 200 people attended a May 1984 Clifton Town Meeting (the neighborhood community council) and they presented a petition signed by 3,000 residents. They later formed a committee called the Clifton Theatre Corp. and began taking legal action. After challenging multiple lower court decisions, and two years of legal battles, the Supreme Court of Ohio sided with the Clifton Theatre Corp. in 1986. The decision was a unanimous 7-0. The developers decided to take a tax break and donated the theater to the city.

=== Re-Opening (1986-Present) ===
After the theater was donated, volunteers worked to gather funds in order to restore the theater. To reach their goal of $600,000 volunteers sold partnerships to investors for $20,000 a share. Renovation began in 1989, and they contracted local architect Paul Miller to design the new outside look of the theater.

The theater officially re-opened with three screens on April 20, 1990. Their opening film was Cinema Paradiso. Gary Goldman was brought on to manage the theater in 1991. Goldman made the theater profitable and worked to source better films.

The theater went through a major renovation in 1999, adding 3 more screens. In 2010 the theater shifted towards all-digital projection.

== Screenings ==
The theatre is an arthouse theater, showing films that normal theaters usually wouldn't. These include foreign, low-budget, and art films.

Like many other art house theatres, the Esquire also regularly shows The Rocky Horror Picture Show as a midnight movie.
