= Bobby Darin discography =

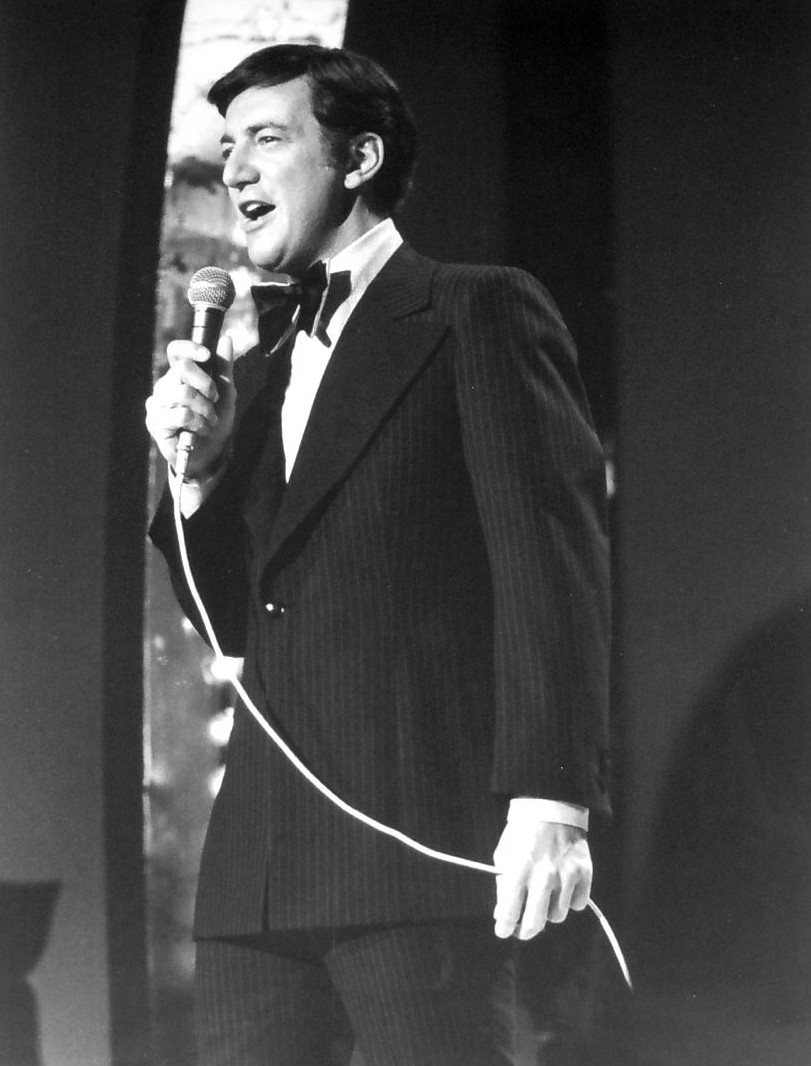
- Darin performing in 1972.
- Studio albums: 27
- Live albums: 4
- Compilation albums: multiple
- Singles: 70

This is the discography of American singer Bobby Darin. It lists Darin's original singles, LPs, and compilations from his career. Darin recorded his first single, "Rock Island Line"/"Timber", on the Decca label in 1956, and released his eponymous debut album two years later in 1958. The majority of the singer's recordings were released on Atco/Atlantic Records and later on Capitol Records. Darin had many hit singles during his lifetime and two went to No. 1 on various charts – "Dream Lover" and "Mack the Knife".

== Albums ==
=== Studio albums ===
Title	Album details	Peak chart positions			
Title	Album details	US	US CB Mono	US CB Stereo	UK
Bobby Darin	Released: 1958; Label: Atco (33–102)	—	—	—	—
That's All	Released: 1959; Label: Atco (33-104/SD 33–104)	7	9	16	15
This Is Darin	Released: 1960; Label: Atco (33-115/SD 33–115)	6	5	7	4
For Teenagers Only	Released: 1960; Label: Atco (SP 1001)	—	38	—	—
The 25th Day of December	Released: 1960; Label: Atco (33-125/SD 33–125)	—	—	—	—
Two of a Kind (with Johnny Mercer)	Released: 1961; Label: Atco (33-126/SD 33–126)	—	38	—	—
Love Swings	Released: 1961; Label: Atco (33-134/SD 33–134)	92	49	—	—
Twist with Bobby Darin	Released: 1961; Label: Atco (33-138/SD 33–138)	48	45	—	—
Bobby Darin Sings Ray Charles	Released: 1962; Label: Atco (33-140/SD 33–140)	96	41	—	—
Things and Other Things	Released: 1962; Label: Atco (33-146/SD 33–146)	45	43	—	—
Oh! Look at Me Now	Released: 1962; Label: Capitol (T 1791/ST 1791)	100	—	—	—
You're the Reason I'm Living	Released: 1963; Label: Capitol (T 1866/ST 1866)	43	19	—	—
It's You or No One	Released: 1963; Label: Atco (33-124/SD 33–124)	—	—	—	—
18 Yellow Roses	Released: 1963; Label: Capitol (T 1942/ST 1942)	98	69	—	—
Earthy!	Released: 1963; Label: Capitol (T 1826/ST 1826)	—	—	—	—
Golden Folk Hits	Released: 1963; Label: Capitol (T 2007/ST 2007)	—	—	—	—
Winners	Released: 1964; Label: Atco (33-167/SD 33-167)	—	—	—	—
From Hello Dolly to Goodbye Charlie	Released: 1964; Label: Capitol (T 2194/ST 2194)	107	—	—	—
Venice Blue	Released: 1965; Label: Capitol (T 2322/ST 2322)	132	—	—	—
Bobby Darin Sings The Shadow of Your Smile	Released: 1966; Label: Atlantic (8121/SD 8121)	—	—	—	—
In a Broadway Bag (Mame)	Released: 1966; Label: Atlantic (8126/SD 8126)	—	—	—	—
If I Were a Carpenter	Released: 1966; Label: Atlantic (8135/SD 8135)	142	—	97	—
Inside Out	Released: 1967; Label: Atlantic (8142/SD 8142)	—	—	—	—
Bobby Darin Sings Doctor Dolittle	Released: 1967; Label: Atlantic (8154/SD 8154)	—	—	—	—
Bobby Darin Born Walden Robert Cassotto	Released: 1968; Label: Direction (1936)	—	—	—	—
Commitment	Released: 1969; Label: Direction (1937)	—	—	—	—
Bobby Darin	Released: 1972; Label: Motown (M 753L)	—	—	—	—
"—" denotes releases that did not chart.

=== Live albums ===
Title	Album details	Peak chart positions		
Title	Album details	US	US CB Mono	US CB Stereo
Darin at the Copa	Released: 1960; Label: Atco (33-122/SD 33–122)	9	6	12
Live at the Desert Inn	Released: 1987; Label: Motown (MCD09070MD)	—	—	—

=== Compilation albums ===
Title	Album details	Peak chart positions			
Title	Album details	US	US CB Mono	US CB Stereo	UK
The Bobby Darin Story	Released: 1961; Label: Atco (33-131/SD 33–131)	18	—	11	—
Darin: 1936–1973	Released: 1974; Label: Motown (M 813)	—	—	136	—

== Singles ==
Title	Year	Peak chart positions								Album
Title	Year	US Hot	US CB	BEL (Fl)	BEL (Wa)	CAN (CHUM) (RPM)	NL	NOR	UK	Album
"Rock Island Line" (as Bobby Darin and The Jaybirds)	1956	—	—	—	—	—	—	—	—	Non-LP tracks
"Silly Willie" (as Bobby Darin and The Jaybirds)	1956	—	—	—	—	—	—	—	—	Non-LP tracks
"Hear Them Bells"	1956	—	—	—	—	—	—	—	—	Non-LP tracks
"Dealer in Dreams"	1957	—	—	—	—	—	—	—	—	Non-LP tracks
"Million Dollar Baby"	1958	—	—	—	—	—	—	—	—	Bobby Darin
"Don't Call My Name"	1958	—	—	—	—	—	—	—	—	Bobby Darin
"Just in Case You Change Your Mind"	1958	—	—	—	—	—	—	—	—	Bobby Darin
"Splish Splash"	1958	3	2	—	—	3	—	—	18	Bobby Darin
"Early in the Morning"	1958	24	25	—	—	—	—	—	—	The Bobby Darin Story
"Queen of the Hop"	1958	9	12	—	—	7	—	—	24	The Bobby Darin Story
"Mighty, Mighty Man" (as Bobby Darin And The Rinky Dinks)	1958	—	—	—	—	—	—	—	—	Twist with Bobby Darin
"Plain Jane"	1959	38	30	—	—	21	—	—	—	The Bobby Darin Story
"Dream Lover"	1959	2	3	12	21	5	—	5	1	The Bobby Darin Story
"Mack the Knife"	1959	1	1	11	15	1	14	9	1	That's All
"Beyond the Sea"	1960	6	7	—	—	7	—	—	8	That's All
"Clementine"	1960	21	13	—	48	12	—	—	8	This Is Darin
"(Won't You Come Home) Bill Bailey"	1960	19	16	—	—	13	—	—	34	The Bobby Darin Story
"Beachcomber"	1960	100	50	—	—	30	—	—	—	Things and Other Things
"Artificial Flowers"	1960	20	19	—	—	10	—	—	—	The Bobby Darin Story
"Somebody to Love"	1960	45	58	—	—	10	—	—	—	For Teenagers Only
"Christmas Auld Lang Syne"	1960	51	50	—	—	—	—	—	—	The 25th Day of December
"Lazy River"	1960	14	18	—	—	16	—	—	2	The Bobby Darin Story
"Nature Boy"	1961	40	31	—	—	14	—	—	24	Things and Other Things
"Theme from 'Come September'" (as Bobby Darin & His Orchestra)	1961	113	55	—	—	—	—	—	50	Things and Other Things
"You Must Have Been a Beautiful Baby"	1961	5	7	—	—	2	—	—	10	Twist with Bobby Darin
"Irresistible You"	1961	15	16	—	—	2	—	—	—	Twist with Bobby Darin
"Multiplication"	1961	30	26	—	29	2	—	4	5	Twist with Bobby Darin
"What'd I Say" (Part 1)	1962	24	26	—	—	21	—	—	—	Bobby Darin Sings Ray Charles
"Things"	1962	3	10	—	—	3	—	5	2	Things and Other Things
"Baby Face"	1962	42	38	—	—	21	—	—	40	Non-LP tracks
"If a Man Answers"	1962	32	28	—	—	19	—	—	24	Non-LP tracks
"I've Found a New Baby"	1962	90	133	—	—	—	—	—	—	Winners
"You're the Reason I'm Living"	1963	3	5	—	—	11	—	—	—	You're the Reason I'm Living
"18 Yellow Roses"	1963	10	12	—	—	12	—	—	37	18 Yellow Roses
"Treat My Baby Good"	1963	43	38	—	—	26	—	—	—	The Best of Bobby Darin
"Be Mad, Little Girl"	1963	64	74	—	—	—	—	—	—	Non-LP tracks
"I Wonder Who's Kissing Her Now"	1964	93	83	—	—	—	—	—	—	Non-LP tracks
"Milord"	1964	45	39	—	—	25/14	—	—	—	Winners
"Similau"	1964	—	—	—	—	—	—	—	—	Non-LP tracks
"The Things in This House"	1964	86	89	—	—	41	—	—	—	Non-LP tracks
"Minnie the Moocher"	1964	—	—	—	—	—	—	—	—	Non-LP tracks
"Hello, Dolly!"	1965	79	114	—	—	—	—	—	—	Hello Dolly to Goodbye Charlie
"Venice Blue (Que C'est Triste Venise)"	1965	133	94	—	—	—	—	—	—	Venice Blue
"When I Get Home"	1965	—	—	—	—	—	—	—	—	Non-LP tracks
"That Funny Feeling"	1965	—	—	—	—	—	—	—	—	Non-LP tracks
"We Didn't Ask to Be Brought Here"	1966	117	—	—	—	—	—	—	—	Non-LP tracks
"The Breaking Point"	1966	—	—	—	—	—	—	—	—	Non-LP tracks
"Mame"	1966	53	63	—	—	18/50	—	—	—	In a Broadway Bag
"Merci Cherie"	1966	—	—	—	—	—	—	—	—	Non-LP track
"If I Were a Carpenter"	1966	8	9	—	—	7/8	7	—	9	If I Were a Carpenter
"The Girl Who Stood Beside Me"	1966	66	65	—	—	—	—	—	—	If I Were a Carpenter
"Lovin' You"	1966	32	43	—	—	—	—	—	—	If I Were a Carpenter
"The Lady Came from Baltimore"	1967	62	73	—	—	—	—	—	—	Inside Out
"Darling, Be Home Soon"	1967	93	140	—	—	17	—	—	—	Inside Out
"Talk to the Animals"	1967	—	—	—	—	—	—	—	—	Bobby Darin Sings Doctor Dolittle
"Long Line Rider"	1968	79	66	—	—	67	—	—	—	Bobby Darin Born Walden Robert Cassotto
"Me & Mr. Hohner"	1969	123	119	—	—	—	—	—	—	Commitment
"Distractions" (Part 1)	1969	—	—	—	—	—	—	—	—	Commitment
"Baby May"	1970	—	—	—	—	—	—	—	—	Non-LP tracks
"Maybe We Can Get It Together"	1970	—	—	—	—	—	—	—	—	Non-LP tracks
"Melodie"	1971	—	—	—	—	—	—	—	—	Non-LP tracks
"Simple Song of Freedom"	1972	—	—	—	—	—	—	—	—	Non-LP tracks
"Sail Away"	1972	—	—	—	—	—	—	—	—	Bobby Darin
"Average People"	1973	—	—	—	—	—	—	—	—	Bobby Darin
"Happy"	1973	67	59	—	—	—	—	—	—	Darin: 1936–1973
"—" denotes releases that did not chart.
