= As Long as I'm Singing: The Bobby Darin Collection =

Box set by Bobby Darin
- Released: November 21, 1995
- Genre: Pop
- Length: 254:56
- Label: Rhino

Bobby Darin chronology
Live at the Desert Inn (1987)	As Long as I'm Singing: The Bobby Darin Collection (1995)	Go ahead & Back up (The lost Motown masters) (2018)

Professional ratings
Review scores
Source	Rating
AllMusic	4.5/5 stars
Los Angeles Times	4/4 stars
The Elvis Forum	10/10

As Long as I'm Singing: The Bobby Darin Collection is a four-disc box set, released in 1995 by Rhino Records.

== Critical reception ==
Richie Unterberger begins his AllMusic review with "A four-CD box set spanning several styles, labels, and eras, this will stand as the most thorough retrospective of Darin's eclectic career, though not necessarily the best."

Robert Hilburn of the Los Angeles Times calls this box set an "excellent four-disc survey of Darin’s remarkably varied career." He rates the box set 4 out of 4 stars.

Chad Jones of the East Bay Times says this compilation is "By far the most comprehensive overview of Darin’s multi-faceted career."

Shane Brown of The Elvis Forum writes "This 4CD set from Rhino was released over twenty years ago, and yet still holds a special place in most fan's hearts." He rates the box set a 10 out of a possible 10.

== Track listing ==
All tracks are written by Bobby Darin, unless otherwise noted.

Disc one
No.	Title	Writer(s)	Length
1.	"Early in the Morning" (The Rinky Dinks)	Bobby Darin; Woody Harris	2:15
2.	"Splish Splash"	Bobby Darin; Jean Murray	2:10
3.	"Queen of the Hop"	Woody Harris	2:05
4.	"Don't Call My Name"	Bobby Darin; Don Kirshner	2:00
5.	"All the Way Home"	Otis Blackwell; Luther Dixon	1:48
6.	"Lost Love"	Bobby Darin; Don Kirshner	2:23
7.	"Plain Jane"	Mort Shuman; Doc Pomus	1:52
8.	"Dream Lover (Demo Version)"		2:55
9.	"Dream Lover"		2:28
10.	"Bullmoose"		2:25
11.	"Somebody to Love"		2:10
12.	"I Got a Woman (Live)"	Ray Charles; Renald Richard	3:27
13.	"You Must Have Been a Beautiful Baby"	Johnny Mercer; Harry Warren	2:12
14.	"Irresistible You"	Gene De Paul; Don Raye	2:32
15.	"Multiplication"		2:13
16.	"What'd I Say"	Ray Charles	4:03
17.	"The Right Time"	Lew Herman	3:24
18.	"If a Man Answers"		2:21
19.	"Treat My Baby Good"		1:50
20.	"When I Get Home"	Bobby Darin; Russell Alquist	2:26
21.	"We Didn't Ask to Be Brought Here"		2:17
22.	"Funny What Love Can Do"		2:49
23.	"She Knows"	Gary Bonner; Alan Gordon	2:17
24.	"Easy Rider"	Traditional	2:18
25.	"Everywhere I Go"		2:53
26.	"Sail Away"	Randy Newman	3:49
Total length:			65:22

Disc two
No.	Title	Writer(s)	Length
1.	"Mack the Knife"	Kurt Weill; Bertolt Brecht; Marc Blitzstein	3:03
2.	"Beyond the Sea"	Charles Trénet; Jack Lawrence	2:47
3.	"That's the Way Love Is"		2:59
4.	"That's All"	Alan Brandt; Bob Haymes	2:01
5.	"Clementine"	Woody Harris	3:12
6.	"The Gal that Got Away"	Harold Arlen; Ira Gershwin	4:01
7.	"Black Coffee"	Sonny Burke; Paul Francis Webster	3:49
8.	"Guys and Dolls"	Frank Loesser	2:09
9.	"Won't You Come Home Bill Bailey"	Hughie Cannon	2:04
10.	"Minnie the Moocher"	Cab Calloway; Irving Mills	2:36
11.	"Easy Living"	Ralph Rainger; Leo Robin	2:39
12.	"I Found a New Baby"	Jack Palmer; Spencer Williams	2:08
13.	"It's You or No One"	Sammy Cahn; Jule Styne	3:20
14.	"Milord"	Georges Moustaki; Marguerite Monnot	1:59
15.	"Two of a Kind" (with Johnny Mercer)	Johnny Mercer; Walden Cassotto	3:26
16.	"Artificial Flowers"	Sheldon Harnick; Jerry Bock	3:15
17.	"Lazy River"	Hoagy Carmichael; Sidney Arodin	2:31
18.	"It Had to Be You"	Isham Jones; Gus Kahn	2:10
19.	"How About You"	Burton Lane; Ralph Freed	2:00
20.	"Nature Boy"	Eden Ahbez	2:31
21.	"Baby Face"	Harry Akst; Benny Davis	2:05
Total length:			56:45

Disc three
No.	Title	Writer(s)	Length
1.	"As Long as I'm Singing"		1:32
2.	"Oh! Look at Me Now"	Joe Bushkin; John DeVries	2:42
3.	"A Nightingale Sang in Berkeley Square"	Eric Maschwitz; Manning Sherwin	2:59
4.	"The Party's Over"	Betty Comden; Adolph Green; Jule Styne	2:25
5.	"This Isn't Heaven"	Richard Rodgers	2:13
6.	"My Funny Valentine" (Live)	Richard Rodgers; Lorenz Hart	3:35
7.	"You're Nobody till Somebody Loves You" (Live)	Russ Morgan; Larry Stock; James Cavanaugh	3:06
8.	"Hello, Dolly!"	Jerry Herman	3:12
9.	"Once in a Lifetime (Only Once)"	Leslie Bricusse; Anthony Newley	2:05
10.	"Look at Me"	Bobby Darin; Randy Newman	1:49
11.	"Charade"	Henry Mancini; Johnny Mercer	1:45
12.	"Sunday in New York"	Peter Nero; Carroll Coates	2:28
13.	"Somewhere"	Leonard Bernstein; Stephen Sondheim	2:30
14.	"There Ain't No Sweet Gal That's Worth the Salt of My Tears"	Fred Fisher	3:00
15.	"Silver Dollar"	Jack Palmer; Clark Van Ness	2:00
16.	"Lover, Come Back to Me"	Sigmund Romberg; Oscar Hammerstein II	2:20
17.	"Rainin'"		2:47
18.	"The Shadow of Your Smile"	Johnny Mandel; Paul Francis Webster	2:12
19.	"Mame"	Jerry Herman	2:12
20.	"Don't Rain on My Parade"	Jule Styne; Bob Merrill	2:53
21.	"Beautiful Things"	Leslie Bricusse	2:23
22.	"The Curtain Falls (Live)"	Sol Weinstein	3:33
Total length:			55:41

Disc four
No.	Title	Writer(s)	Length
1.	"Things"		2:30
2.	"You're the Reason I'm Living"		2:25
3.	"(I Heard That) Lonesome Whistle"	Jimmie Davis; Hank Williams	2:40
4.	"Sally Was a Good Old Girl"	Harlan Howard	2:32
5.	"18 Yellow Roses"		2:16
6.	"Walking in the Shadow of Love"	Bernie Baum; Bill Giant; Florence Kaye	2:45
7.	"Work Song"	Nat Adderley; Oscar Brown, Jr.	3:27
8.	"I'm on My Way, Great God (Live)"	Traditional	5:04
9.	"Blowin' in the Wind"	Bob Dylan	3:10
10.	"If I Were a Carpenter"	Tim Hardin	2:19
11.	"The Girl that Stood Beside Me"	Tim Hardin	2:25
12.	"Reason to Believe"	Tim Hardin	2:03
13.	"Lovin' You"	John Sebastian	2:11
14.	"The Lady Came from Baltimore"	Tim Hardin	1:53
15.	"I Am"		1:54
16.	"Darling Be Home Soon"	John Sebastian	2:59
17.	"Back Street Girl"	Mick Jagger; Keith Richards	3:38
18.	"I'm Going to Love You"		2:26
19.	"Long Time Movin'"		2:49
20.	"Long Line Rider"		2:55
21.	"In Memoriam"		4:12
22.	"Me & Mr. Hohner"		3:13
23.	"Song for a Dollar"		1:48
24.	"Sweet Reasons"		1:45
25.	"I'll Be Your Baby Tonight (Live)"	Bob Dylan	3:29
26.	"Simple Song of Freedom (Demo)"		4:14
27.	"Simple Song of Freedom (Live)"		4:06
Total length:			77:08

- Track information and credits taken from the album's liner notes.
