= The Bobby Darin Story =

Compilation album by Bobby Darin
- Released: May 1961
- Genre: Pop, rock and roll, jazz, bolero
- Length: 29:36
- Label: Atco
- Producer: Ahmet Ertegün

Bobby Darin chronology
| Two of a Kind (1961) | The Bobby Darin Story (1961) | Love Swings (1961) |

The Bobby Darin Story is a 1961 compilation album by American singer Bobby Darin, featuring narration by Darin himself. The master plates of several versions of this release contained Darin's autograph in the trail off section of the vinyl on side two.

The album debuted on the Billboard Top LPs chart in the issue dated May 22, 1961, and remained on the chart for 42 weeks, peaking at number 18. It also debuted on the Cashbox albums chart in the issue dated April 29, 1961 and remained on the chart for 29 weeks, peaking at number 11.

== Reception ==
Professional ratings
Review scores
| Source | Rating |
|---|---|
| Allmusic | 3/5 stars |
| The Encyclopedia of Popular Music | 4/5 stars |

Music critic Cub Koda wrote in his Allmusic review on the CD reissue "Released in the early '60s, here's the first part of Darin's career told by the vocalist himself in a 12-song greatest-hits collection that really works. The narration inserts still function well after all these years, making you realize that this was originally a vinyl album, as Darin negotiates from rock & roller to finger-snapping lounge lizard."

== Track listing ==
=== Side one ===
1. "Splish Splash" (Bobby Darin, Murray "The K" Kaufman, Jean Murray) – 2:08 (from Bobby Darin)
2. "Early in the Morning" (Darin, Woody Harris) – 2:14 (from Atco single 6121)
3. "Queen of the Hop" (Harris) – 2:03 (from Atco single 6127)
4. "Plain Jane" (Doc Pomus, Mort Shuman) – 1:53 (from Atco single 6133)
5. "Dream Lover" (Darin) – 2:27 (from Atco single 6140)
6. "Mack the Knife" (Bertolt Brecht, Kurt Weill) – 2:57 (from That's All)

=== Side two ===
1. "Beyond the Sea" (Jack Lawrence, Charles Trenet) – 2:42 (from That's All)
2. "Clementine" (Woody Harris) – 3:14 (from This is Darin)
3. "Bill Bailey" (arranged by Bobby Darin and Bobby Scott) – 2:02 (from Atco single 6167)
4. "Artificial Flowers" (Jerry Bock, Sheldon Harnick) – 3:13 (from Atco single 6179)
5. "Somebody to Love" (Darin) – 2:11 (from Atco single 6179)
6. "Lazy River" (Hoagy Carmichael, Sidney Arodin) – 2:32 (from Atco single 6188)

== Personnel ==
- Bobby Darin – vocals and narration
