= Darin at the Copa =

Live album by Bobby Darin
- Released: July 1960
- Recorded: June 1960
- Venue: Copacabana, New York City
- Genre: Pop
- Length: 38:51
- Label: Atco
- Producer: Ahmet Ertegün, Nesuhi Ertegun

Bobby Darin chronology
This Is Darin (1960)	Darin at the Copa (1960)	For Teenagers Only (1960)

Darin at the Copa is Bobby Darin's fourth album and third straight top-ten charting LP in the US. it debuted on the Billboard Best Selling LPs chart in the issue dated October 17, 1960, and remained on the chart for 38 weeks, peaking at number nine. It also debuted on the Cashbox albums chart in the issue dated August 27, 1960, and remained on the chart for a total of 49 weeks, peaking at number six. The album was recorded live at the Copacabana nightclub in New York.

== Reception ==
Professional ratings
Review scores
Source	Rating
Allmusic	2.5/5 stars
The Encyclopedia of Popular Music	3/5 stars
The New Rolling Stone Album Guide	3/5 stars
MusicHound	3.5/5 stars

Music critic John Bush wrote in his Allmusic review "A complete entertainer, Darin only occasionally concentrates on the business of singing, making Darin at the Copa the type of concert work that rarely succeeds as a purely aural recording. Bobby Darin is obviously performing, not just singing, and listeners are often left out during his countless jokes and vocal asides—each of which get enormous responses from the original audience. The music is solid and Darin does his finger-popping best, but he walks a thin line between swinging and an outrageous parody of same... listening decades later, it's difficult to avoid the wish he'd played this date just a bit more straight."

== Track listing ==
1. Medley: "Swing Low Sweet Chariot/Lonesome Road" (arranged by Bobby Darin and Richard Wess, (Traditional/Gene Austin, Nat Shilkret) – 2:12
2. "Some of These Days" (Shelton Brooks) – 2:34
3. "Mack the Knife" (Bert Brecht, Kurt Weill, Marc Blitzstein) – 2:58
4. "Love for Sale" (Cole Porter) – 3:02
5. "Clementine" (Woody Harris) – 3:13
6. "You'd Be So Nice to Come Home To" (Cole Porter) – 2:09
7. "Dream Lover" (Bobby Darin) – 2:04
8. "Bill Bailey, Won't You Please Come Home" (arranged by Bobby Darin and Bobby Scott) (Hughie Cannon) – 2:02
9. "I Have Dreamed" (Richard Rodgers, Oscar Hammerstein II) - (Richard Rodgers, Oscar Hammerstein II) – 2:06
10. "I Can't Give You Anything But Love" (Dorothy Fields, Jimmy McHugh) – 2:14
11. "Alright, O.K., You Win" (Mayme Watts, Sid Wyche) – 4:49
12. Medley: "By Myself/When Your Lover Has Gone" (Arthur Schwartz, Howard Dietz/Einar Aaron Swan) – 3:29
13. "I Got a Woman" (Ray Charles) – 3:53
14. "That's All" (Alan Brandt, Bob Haymes) – 2:06

== Personnel ==
- Bobby Darin – vocals, vibraphone
- Paul Shelley's Copacabana Orchestra - orchestra
- Richard Behrke – conductor, piano
- Ronnie Zito – drums

Technical

- Phil Ieble, Tom Dowd – engineers
- Supervised by Ahmet Ertegün and Nesuhi Ertegün
