= Twist with Bobby Darin =

Studio album by Bobby Darin
- Released: 1961
- Genre: Rock and roll
- Length: 26:29
- Label: Atco
- Producer: Ahmet Ertegün

Bobby Darin chronology
Love Swings (1961)	Twist with Bobby Darin (1961)	Bobby Darin Sings Ray Charles (1962)

Twist with Bobby Darin is an album by American singer Bobby Darin, released in 1961.

The album debuted on the Billboard Top LPs chart in the issue dated January 27, 1962, and remained on the chart for 31 weeks, peaking at number 48. It also debuted on the Cashbox albums chart in the issue dated February 17, 1962, and remained on the chart for a total of five weeks, peaking at number 45.

Five of the songs were previously released the year before on For Teenagers Only and the first six were written by Darin himself.

== Reception ==
Professional ratings
Review scores
Source	Rating
Allmusic	3/5 stars
The Encyclopedia of Popular Music	3/5 stars

In his Allmusic review, critic JT Griffith wrote "The dance album is a collection of rock songs, all of which have backbeat suitable for, obviously, twisting... Twist with Bobby Darin was something of a stop-gap album."

== Track listing ==
=== Side one ===
1. "Bullmoose" (Bobby Darin) – 2:31
2. "Early in the Morning" (Darin, Woody Harris) – 2:17
3. "Mighty Mighty Men" (Darin) – 1:40
4. "You Know How" (Darin) – 2:07
5. "Somebody to Love" (Darin) – 2:19
6. "Multiplication" (Darin) – 2:18

=== Side two ===
1. "Irresistible You" (Al Kasha, Luther Dixon) – 2:34
2. "Queen of the Hop" (Harris) – 2:14
3. "You Must Have Been a Beautiful Baby" (Johnny Mercer, Harry Warren) – 2:11
4. "Keep a Walkin'" (Howard Greenfield, Neil Sedaka) – 1:59
5. "Pity Miss Kitty" (Harris) – 2:08
6. "I Ain't Sharin' Sharon" (Doc Pomus, Mort Shuman) – 2:11

== Personnel ==
- Bobby Darin – vocals
- Neil Sedaka - piano
