= Live at the Desert Inn =

- Cover of 2005 reissue

Live album by Bobby Darin
- Released: 1987
- Recorded: February 6, 1971
- Genre: Pop, Folk rock
- Length: 1:08:38
- Label: Motown
- Producer: Jerry Marcellino, Mel Larsen

Bobby Darin chronology
Commitment (1969)	Live at the Desert Inn (1987)

Live at the Desert Inn is a live album by American singer Bobby Darin, released in 1987.

The album was intended to be Darin's first album release for Motown but did not appear until 1987. It was also released as Finally. It was reissued in 2005 on the Concord label with several bonus tracks.

== Reception ==
Professional ratings
Review scores
Source	Rating
All About Jazz	4/5 stars
AllMusic	2.5/5 stars

Music critic John Bush wrote in his AllMusic review: "Darin most certainly did his best to entertain and enlighten his regular concert attendees—musically, socially, and even politically—without worrying about the blowback from his largely conservative base." Looking back from 2005, All About Jazz described the album as "With backup singers, a powerful rhythm section and a large jazz orchestra, the popular singer gave us some of his best material... He was the consummate entertainer, and always gave his audience his all."

== Track listing ==
1. "Intro/Monologue" – 0:37
2. "Save the Country" (Laura Nyro) – 3:22
3. "Moritat (Mack the Knife)" (Bertolt Brecht, Kurt Weill, Marc Blitzstein) – 3:33
4. "Fire and Rain" (James Taylor) – 6:08
5. "Hi De Ho (That Old Sweet Roll)" (Gerry Goffin, Carole King) – 5:52
6. "Monologue" – 2:12
7. "Beatles' Medley: Hey Jude/Eleanor Rigby/Blackbird/A Day in the Life" (John Lennon, Paul McCartney) – 6:58
8. "(Your Love Keeps Lifting Me) Higher and Higher" (Carl Smith, Gary Jackson, Raynard Miner) – 4:07
9. "I'll Be Your Baby Tonight" (Bob Dylan) – 3:44
10. "Monologue" – 1:14
11. "If I Were A Carpenter" (Tim Hardin) – 3:44
12. "Simple Song Of Freedom" (Bobby Darin) – 4:23
13. "Finale/Band Introduction" – 6:03
14. "Encore: Chain of Fools/Respect/Splish Splash/Johnny B. Goode" (Darin, Chuck Berry, Don Covay, Jean Murray, Otis Redding) – 8:30
15. "Work Song" (Nat Adderley, Oscar Brown, Jr.) – 3:33
16. "Beyond The Sea" (Charles Trenet, Jack Lawrence, Albert Lasry) – 4:20

== Personnel ==
- Bobby Darin – vocals
- Bill Aikens – piano
- Tommy Amato – drums
- Quitman Dennis – bass
- Terry Kellman – guitar
- The Jeannie Thomas Singers – background vocals
- Carleton Hayes Orchestra
