= 18 Yellow Roses (song) =

1963 single by Bobby Darin

Single by Bobby Darin

from the album 18 Yellow Roses
- B-side: "Not for Me"
- Released: May 6, 1963
- Recorded: April 6, 1963
- Genre: Country pop
- Length: 2:15
- Label: Capitol
- Songwriter: Bobby Darin
- Producer: Nick Venet

Bobby Darin singles chronology
"You're the Reason I'm Living" (1962)	"18 Yellow Roses" (1963)	"Treat My Baby Good" (1963)

"18 Yellow Roses" is a country pop song by American singer Bobby Darin from his fourteenth studio album 18 Yellow Roses (1963). It was released as the only single from the album on May 6, 1963, by Capitol Records.

== Track listing and formats ==
- US 7-inch single

A. "18 Yellow Roses" – 2:15
B. "Not for Me" – 2:15

== Credits and personnel ==
- Bobby Darin – songwriter, vocals
- Nick Venet – producer
- Jack Nitzsche – arranger

Credits and personnel adapted from the 18 Yellow Roses album and 7-inch single liner notes.

== Charts ==
Weekly chart performance for "18 Yellow Roses"
Chart (1963)	Peak position
Ireland (IRMA)	10
UK Singles (OCC)	37
US Billboard Hot 100	10
US Adult Contemporary (Billboard)	5
US Hot R&B/Hip-Hop Songs (Billboard)	28
