= Earthy =

Earthy may refer to:

- Soil or earth
- Earthy (Bobby Darin album)
- Earthy (Kenny Burrell album), 1957
- Earthy (wine), a wine tasting descriptor
