= When I Get Home =

When I Get Home may refer to:

- "When I Get Home" (song), 1964 song by the Beatles
- When I Get Home (album), 2019 studio album by Solange
- When I Get Home (film), 2019 American musical short film
- "When I Get Home", 1965 song by Bobby Darin

== See also ==
- "When I Get Home, You're So Dead"
