= If I Were a Carpenter =

If I Were a Carpenter may refer to:

- "If I Were a Carpenter" (song), a song composed by Tim Hardin and popularized by Bobby Darin
- If I Were a Carpenter (Bobby Darin album), a 1966 album by Bobby Darin
- If I Were a Carpenter (tribute album), a tribute album to The Carpenters
- "If I Were a Carpenter" (Auf Wiedersehen, Pet), a 1983 television episode
