= You're the Reason I'm Living (album) =

Studio album by Bobby Darin
- Released: February 1963
- Recorded: 1962–1963
- Studio: Capitol (Hollywood)
- Genre: Country
- Length: 31:22
- Label: Capitol
- Producer: Nick Venet

Bobby Darin chronology
Oh! Look at Me Now (1962)	You're the Reason I'm Living (1963)	It's You or No One (1963)

Singles from You're the Reason I'm Living
- 1. "You're the Reason I'm Living" Released: December 31, 1962

You're the Reason I'm Living is a studio album by the American singer Bobby Darin, released in February 1963. It contains country and western music, often with a big band twist, and features arrangements by Jimmie Haskell, Shorty Rogers and Gerald Wilson. The title track was a number three hit single.

The album debuted on the Billboard Top LPs chart in the issue dated March 16, 1963, and remained on the chart for 15 weeks, peaking at number 43. It debuted on the Cashbox albums chart in the issue dated March 9, 1963, and remained on the chart for a total of 14 weeks, peaking at number 19.

The album was released on compact disc by EMI on December 28, 1999, as tracks 1 through 12 on a pairing of two albums on one CD along with Darin's 1965 album, I Wanna Be Around. The album was released on compact disc by Exemplar in 2002, along with Darin's 1963 album, 18 Yellow Roses.

== Background ==
The album was built around the "You're the Reason I'm Living" single. This (along with the flip-side, Now You're Gone) was recorded on December 3, 1962. When the single became a bit hit, a decision was made to build an album of country songs around it. These new songs were recorded on January 13–15, 1963. It was the first time that Darin had consciously built an album around a hit single - Things and Other Things, featuring the hit "Things", had been simply a pick-up album of leftovers released to cash-in on the single success. The production and release of You're the Reason I'm Living album had a knock-on effect on Darin's intended release schedule. Earthy!, his album of folk songs from around the world, had been slated for release in February 1963 (and Darin had been promoting it on TV appearances), but was pushed back to July of that year. Who Can I Count On is notable for being a duet with Merry Clayton (aka Mary Clayton), and was her first professional recording.

== Reception ==
Professional ratings
Review scores
Source	Rating
AllMusic	2.5/5 stars
The Encyclopedia of Popular Music	3/5 stars

On release, Variety mentions "The Title Track" and the 11 another songs that accompany are extensions of that stirring sound". BIllboard magazine called the album a "powerhouse package," Cash Box gave the album a positive reviews, saying "he comes up with eleven other potent country favorites all delivered in his dis-tinctive wide-range style". and TV Radio Mirror said in their review that "Bobby certainly did these tunes up right."

Music critic Richie Unterberger called the release "a merely fair album that reflected a trend of the day. As on numerous Ray Charles country-pop cuts, the orchestration and backup vocals got a little overbearingly sappy sometimes. Swing jazz-like arrangements were applied to country material sometimes as well..."

== Track listing ==
=== Side one ===
1. "Sally Was a Good Old Girl" (Harlan Howard) – 2:35
2. "Be Honest With Me" (Gene Autry, Fred Rose) – 2:25
3. "Oh, Lonesome Me" (Don Gibson) – 3:04
4. "(I Heard That) Lonesome Whistle"(Hank Williams, Jimmie Davis) – 2:43
5. "It Keeps Right On a-Hurtin'" (Johnny Tillotson) – 2:19
6. "You're the Reason I'm Living" (Bobby Darin) – 2:28

=== Side two ===
1. "Please Help Me, I'm Falling" (Don Robertson, Hal Blair) – 2:46
2. "Under Your Spell Again" (Buck Owens, Dusty Rhodes) – 2:51
3. "Here I Am" (Glen Campbell, Marc Douglas) – 2:32
4. "Who Can I Count On?" (Sammy Masters) (Duet with Merry Clayton) – 2:34
5. "Now You're Gone" (Darin) – 2:14
6. "Release Me (And Let Me Love You Again)" (Eddie Miller, Robert Yount, James Pebworth) – 2:51

== Charts ==
=== Album ===
Chart (1963)	Peak position
U.S. Top LPs (Billboard)	43
U.S. Cashbox	19

=== Singles ===
Year	Title	U.S. Hot 100	U.S. Cashbox
1963	"You're the Reason I'm Living"	3	5
