= Since You've Been Gone =

Since You've Been Gone may refer to:

== Music ==
=== Albums ===
- Since You've Been Gone (album), a 2001 album by Damage

=== Songs ===
- "Since You've Been Gone" (Day26 song), 2008
- "Since You've Been Gone" (The Outfield song), 1987
- "Since You've Been Gone" (Powderfinger song), 2004
- "(Sweet Sweet Baby) Since You've Been Gone", a 1968 song by Aretha Franklin
- "Since You've Been Gone", a song by Billy Fury from The Sound of Fury
- "Since You've Been Gone", a song by Bobby Darin (see also: Bobby Darin discography)
- "Since You've Been Gone", a song by Fine Young Cannibals from The Finest
- "Since You've Been Gone", a song by Impellitteri from Stand in Line
- "Since You've Been Gone", a song by The Four Tops from Four Tops Second Album
- "Since You've Been Gone", a song by GPS
- "Since You've Been Gone", a song by The Rasmus, B-side of the single "First Day of My Life"
- "Since You've Been Gone", a song by Theory of a Deadman from Gasoline
- "Since You've Been Gone", a song by Wayne Fontana and The Mindbenders, B-side of the single "Game of Love"
- "Since You've Been Gone", a song by "Weird Al" Yankovic from Bad Hair Day
- "Since You've Been Gone", a song by Tomas N'evergreen (Tomas Christiansen)

== Other media ==
- Since You've Been Gone (film), a 1998 film directed by David Schwimmer
- "Since You've Been Gone", an episode of the television series Everwood
- Since You've Been Gone, a 2014 novel by Morgan Matson

== See also ==
- "Since U Been Gone", a 2004 song by Kelly Clarkson
- "Since You Been Gone", a 1970 funk song by James Brown
- "Since You Been Gone", a 1976 song by Russ Ballard, often incorrectly titled "Since You've Been Gone", also covered by Rainbow (1979)
- "Since You're Gone", a 1982 song by The Cars
- "Since You've Gone", a 1986 song by Belinda Carlisle
