= Winners (Bobby Darin album) =

Studio album by Bobby Darin
- Released: June 1964
- Recorded: February 1–2, 1960
- Genre: Pop
- Length: 31:01
- Label: Atco
- Producer: Herb Abramson, Ahmet Ertegün

Bobby Darin chronology
Golden Folk Hits (1963)	Winners (1964)	From Hello Dolly to Goodbye Charlie (1964)

Winners is a studio album by American singer Bobby Darin, released in June 1964, two years after Bobby had left ATCO (who released Winners) and moved to Capitol.

== Overview ==
Most of the album was recorded in February 1960, with arrangements by Bobby Scott. This was Darin's only vocal jazz album using a small combo rather than an orchestra or big band. Twelve songs were released on the album, but more were recorded at the sessions: "Bill Bailey Won't You Please Come Home" was released as a single in 1960, "Swing Low Sweet Chariot" was released as a single in 1964, and "Minnie the Moocher" was released on a single in 1965. "Swing Low Sweet Chariot" has never been reissued on either LP or CD. Two other songs, "I Got a Woman" (not the same version as on Bobby Darin Sings Ray Charles) and "A Game of Poker" (from the musical Saratoga), remain unreleased.

Two songs on the album do not fit the jazz combo theme and were not recorded at the same time as the other tracks. "Golden Earrings" (from the film of the same name) was recorded on March 25, 1961, and "Milord" had been recorded (in French) on June 20, 1960. They had been released as both sides of a single a few months before Winners was issued in 1964. "Milord" debuted on the Billboard Hot 100 in the issue dated May 16, 1964, peaking at number 45 during its nine-week stay. The song peaked at number 11 on the magazine's Easy Listening chart, during its three-weeks stay. and peaked at number 39 on the Cashbox singles chart during its nine-weeks stay.

== Critical reception ==
Professional ratings
Review scores
Source	Rating
AllMusic	3/5 stars
The Encyclopedia of Popular Music	3/5 stars

Billboard referred to Winners as "romantic and sentimental ballads and up-tempo swingers aimed at the sophisticated set." Cash Box stated that the album was a group of "Darin-fashioned ballads and uptempo pleasers." Record World believed "The readings are clean and positive and will ensnare fans."

In his review for AllMusic, critic Lindsay Planer wrote "In typical Darin style, he turns in thoroughly captivating readings. Granted, there are few (if any) plateaus… 'Easy Living' is perhaps the most emotive and exquisite cut on Winners. It is unfathomable to consider that it was initially deemed not worthy of release, as it remained unissued for over two years. The remarkable breadth of Darin's interpretation has rarely been equaled and likewise serves as a personal best."

== Track listing ==
1. ”Milord” (Marguerite Monnot, Georges Moustaki) – 2:01
2. ”Between the Devil and the Deep Blue Sea” (Harold Arlen, Ted Koehler) – 2:01
3. ”Anything Goes” (Cole Porter) – 2:20
4. ”Do Nothin’ Till You Hear from Me” (Duke Ellington, Bob Russell) – 2:47
5. ”Golden Earrings” (Ray Evans, Jay Livingston, Victor Young) – 2:02
6. ”When Day is Done” (Buddy DeSylva, Robert Katscher) – 3:40
7. ”I've Found a New Baby” (Jack Palmer, Spencer Williams) – 2:11
8. ”What a Diff'rence a Day Made” (Stanley Adams, María Grever) – 3:36
9. ”What Can I Say After I Say I'm Sorry?” (Walter Donaldson, Abe Lyman) – 3:00
10. ”Hard Hearted Hannah” (Jack Yellen, Milton Ager, Charles Bates, Bob Bigelow) – 2:26
11. ”Easy Living” (Ralph Rainger, Leo Robin) – 2:42
12. ”They All Laughed” (George Gershwin, Ira Gershwin) – 2:15

== Personnel ==
- Bobby Darin – vocals
- Bobby Scott – piano, arrangements
- Howard Roberts – guitar
- Larry Bunker – vibraphone
- Joe Mondragon – bass guitar
- Ronnie Zito – drums
- Jack Costanzo, Carlos Vidal – congas
