= Ronnie Zito =

American jazz musician

- Born: Ronald Zito; February 17, 1939 (age 87); Utica, New York, U.S.
- Genre: Jazz
- Instrument: Drums

Ronald "Ronnie" Zito (born February 17, 1939) is an American jazz drummer.

== Early life ==
Zito was born in Utica, New York, into a musical family including his brother Torrie Zito. He began playing drums at the age of 10 and at age 14 took a year and a half of formal lessons.

== Career ==
Zito was the Bobby Darin's personal drummer for four years. He also played with Woody Herman, J.R. Monterose, Frank Rosolino, Peggy Lee, Cher, Roberta Flack, Eartha Kitt and Barry Manilow among countless others.

== Collaborations ==
With Irene Cara

- Anyone Can See (Network, 1982)

With Cher

- Take Me Home (Casablanca Records, 1979)

With Bill Danoff

- Reincarnation (ABC, 1969)

With Bobby Darin

- Two of a Kind (Atco Records, 1961)
- Love Swings (Atco Records, 1961)
- Winners (Atco Records, 1964)

With Roberta Flack

- Feel Like Makin' Love (Atlantic Records, 1975)

With Jake Holmes

- How Much Time (Columbia Records, 1972)

With Phyllis Hyman

- Somewhere in My Lifetime (Arista, 1979)

With Morgana King

- New Beginnings (Paramount Records, 1973)

With Barry Manilow

- This One's for You (Arista Records, 1976)
- Even Now (Arista Records, 1978)
- Barry (Arista Records, 1980)

With Don McLean

- Playin' Favorites (United Artists Records, 1973)

With Helen Merrill

- Casa Forte (Trio, 1980)

With David Pomeranz

- New Blues (Decca Records, 1971)

With Libby Titus

- Libby Titus (Columbia, 1977)

With Frankie Valli

- Closeup (Private Stock Records, 1975)
