= Love Swings =

Studio album by Bobby Darin
- Released: July 1961
- Recorded: March 21–23, 1961
- Genre: Pop
- Length: 29:30
- Label: Atco
- Producer: Ahmet Ertegün

Bobby Darin chronology
The Bobby Darin Story (1961)	Love Swings (1961)	Twist with Bobby Darin (1961)

Love Swings is a studio album by American singer Bobby Darin, released in July 1961 by Atco Records. and arranged by Torrie Zito.

The album debuted on the Billboard Top LPs chart in the issue dated September 11, 1961, and remained on the chart for 10 weeks, peaking at number 92. It debuted on the Cashbox albums chart in the issue dated August 26, 1961, and remained on the chart for a total of three weeks, peaking at number 49.

Love Swings was included in a box set entitled Four Classic Albums Plus Box Set, which contains 3 of his studio albums, 1 compilation, and was released on July 1, 2016.

== Reception ==
Professional ratings
Review scores
Source	Rating
Allmusic	4/5 stars
The Encyclopedia of Popular Music	3/5 stars
Disc	5/5 stars

In his Allmusic review, critic JT Griffith called the album "one of the most unheralded and under appreciated Bobby Darin albums" and is Darin's "most interesting conceptual approach to an album. The sequence of songs takes the listener on an emotional journey from love's first stirrings and its delirious heights to the first disillusionments and melancholy lows. Love Swings plays like two separate albums. While both sides are cohesive thematically, it is hard to listen to the sweet swinging sounds of side one and then eagerly flip to the more haunting and moody songs on side two. This is one of Bobby Darin's most sophisticated albums"

Billboard in its Late Pop Spotlight album reviews stated that "Darin is at his swinging best in the fine new set".

Cashbox stated the album showed Darin "is excellently equipped to purvey these varied emotions convincingly."

Variety notes "Torrie Zito set up a beat that gives Darin plenty of room in which to move around."

In The Show I'll Never Forget, Sean Manning describes the album as "a wonderful Sinatra-school album.

Nigel Hunter of Disc noted "Darin sings faultessly with all the interest and understanding which the true artist devotes to high-class standard material.

== Track listing ==
1. "Long Ago (and Far Away)" (Ira Gershwin, Jerome Kern) – 1:49
2. "I Didn't Know What Time It Was" (Richard Rodgers, Lorenz Hart) – 2:18
3. "How About You?" (Ralph Freed, Burton Lane) – 2:03
4. "The More I See You" (Mack Gordon, Harry Warren) – 1:44
5. "It Had to Be You" (Isham Jones, Gus Kahn) – 2:13
6. "No Greater Love" (Jones, Marty Symes) – 3:23
7. "In Love in Vain" (Kern, Leo Robin) – 3:07
8. "Just Friends" (John Klenner, Sam M. Lewis) – 2:13
9. "Something to Remember You By" (Howard Dietz, Arthur Schwartz) – 3:01
10. "Skylark" (Hoagy Carmichael, Johnny Mercer) – 2:42
11. "Spring Is Here" (Rodgers, Hart) – 2:47
12. "I Guess I'll Have to Change My Plan" (Dietz, Schwartz) – 2:10

== Charts ==
Chart (1961)	Peak position
US Billboard Top LPs	92
US Cash Box	49

== Personnel ==
- Bobby Darin – vocals
- Richard Behrke – piano
- Al Hendrickson – guitar
- Joe Mondragon – bass guitar
- Larry Bunker, Ronnie Zito – drums
- Torrie Zito – arranger, conductor
