= Golden Folk Hits =

Studio album by Bobby Darin
- Released: November 1963
- Recorded: July 1962
- Genre: Folk
- Length: 29:01
- Label: Capitol
- Producer: Nick Venet

Bobby Darin chronology
| Earthy! (1963) | Golden Folk Hits (1963) | Winners (1964) |

Golden Folk Hits is a studio album by American singer Bobby Darin, released in November 1963 by Capitol Records, and arranged by Walter Raim.

The album was released on compact disc by EMI in 2002 as tracks 13 through 24 on a pairing of two albums on one CD with tracks 1 through 12 containing Darin's 1963 album, Earthy!.

== Reception ==
Professional ratings
Review scores
| Source | Rating |
|---|---|
| AllMusic | 3/5 stars |
| Record Mirror | 4/5 stars |
| The Encyclopedia of Popular Music | 3/5 stars |

In his AllMusic review, critic JT Griffith called it "One of the most underappreciated Bobby Darin albums and one of the most exciting to revisit." Variety notes "Darin demonstrates his driving style on "If I Had a Hammer", his country flavor on "Don't Think Twice" and a sensitive feeling on "Blowin' In The Wind"

Billboard commented "Bobby Darin lends his gusto and bravado to a powerful line-up of contemporary folk hits." Cash Box notes the "Superb performances by Darin here should send the set to top ten territory".

== Track listing ==
1. "Mary Don't You Weep" (Traditional)
2. "Where Have All the Flowers Gone?" (Pete Seeger)
3. "If I Had a Hammer" (Lee Hays, Seeger)
4. "Don't Think Twice, It's All Right" (Bob Dylan)
5. "Greenback Dollar" (Hoyt Axton, Kennard Ramsey)
6. "Why, Daddy, Why" (Bobby Scott)
7. "Michael Row the Boat Ashore" (Traditional)
8. "Abilene" (Les Brown, John D. Loudermilk)
9. "Green, Green" (Barry McGuire, Randy Sparks)
10. "Settle Down (Goin' Down That Highway)" (Mike Settle)
11. "Blowin' in the Wind" (Dylan)
12. "Train to the Sky" (Ben Raleigh)

== Personnel ==
- Bobby Darin – vocals
- Glen Campbell, Roger McGuinn, James Burton – guitar
- Walter Raim – arrangements
