= Earthy! =

Studio album LP by Bobby Darin
- Released: July 1963
- Recorded: July 1962
- Genre: Folk
- Length: 39:21
- Label: Capitol
- Producer: Tom Morgan

Bobby Darin chronology
18 Yellow Roses (1963)	Earthy! (1963)	Golden Folk Hits (1963)

Earthy! is an album of folk songs by American singer Bobby Darin, released in July 1963, and arranged by Walter Raim. The album was released on compact disc by EMI in 2002 as tracks 13 through 24 on a pairing of two albums on one CD with tracks 1 through 12 containing of Darin's 1963 album, Golden Folk Hits.

Earthy! was recorded on July 24, 28, 30 and 31, 1962, and was Darin's first album of folk material, although he had recorded and performed songs in the genre before, from "Timber", recorded at his first professional recording session, through to his self-penned "Jailer Bring Me Water". Darin had also performed "I'm Just a Country Boy" on his 1960 UK TV special."

Darin had told columnist Hedda Hopper in December 1961 that "I believe there's a field for folk songs now and will do some of them." When Darin recorded the album less than a year later, he chose his material from a wide range of sources, including spirituals, songs by the current crop of folk singer-songwriters, the jazz number "Work Song", a country song by Hank Williams, a faux sea shanty, and a number of traditional songs from around the world.

Darin incorporated some of the songs into his live act around this time, including adding a folk section into his Las Vegas shows. "Work Song" and "I'm on My Way Great God" were both recorded live in Las Vegas in November 1963 and included on The Curtain Falls: Live at the Flamingo posthumous release in 2000. A 1971 live version of Work Song was issued as a bonus track on the 2005 reissue of the Live at the Desert Inn album. Bobby also sang songs recorded for Earthy! on a number of TV appearances, including The Judy Garland Show and The Dinah Shore Chevy Show.

Earthy! was due to be released in February 1963, but was pushed back until the middle of the year due to the success of the "You're the Reason I'm Living" single and the decision to build an album around that to capitalise on that success.

== Reception ==
Professional ratings
Review scores
Source	Rating
Allmusic	3/5 stars
The Encyclopedia of Popular Music	3/5 stars
New Record Mirror	5/5 stars
Disc	5/5 stars

Earthy! made little sales impact at the time of its release, but Darin still went ahead with a follow-up entitled Golden Folk Hits.

On release, New Record Mirror enjoyed "Bobby's own particular swinging style of Folk Music."

Hunter Nigel of Disc said the album showed "Bobby moves through gospel, spirituals, and latin territory for the set."

Billboard notes "Darin sings them with the excitement he always bring to his material."

Cashbox stated that "Darin comes up with a program of folk and country tunes to give further evidence of his versatility."

Variety wrote in their review that "Bobby Darin's vocal versatility is spotlighted again in this all-folksong roundup. With the help of arranger-conductor Walter Raim, Darin's folk fling emerges as a standout package that's not limited to the folknik circuit alone."

In his Allmusic review, critic Richie Unterberger wrote “It's a solid folk-pop effort, though the arrangements and singing can get a little hokey at times.”

== Track listing ==
1. "Long Time Man" (Ian Tyson, Sylvia Fricker) – 3:30
2. "Work Song" (Nat Adderley, Oscar Brown, Jr.) – 3:36
3. "La Bamba" (Hector Acosta, Harry Belafonte) – 3:14
4. "I'm on My Way Great God" (Traditional) – 4:35
5. "The Sermon of Samson" (Bobby Darin, Walter Raim) – 2:40
6. "Strange Rain" (Tom Paxton) – 3:04
7. "Why Don't You Swing Down" (Darin, Raim) – 1:51
8. "Everything's Okay" (Hank Williams) – 2:23
9. "Guantanamera" (Ramon Espigul) – 4:03
10. "When Their Mama is Gone" (Darin, Raim) – 4:32
11. "Fay-O" (Raim) – 3:09
12. "The Er-I-Ee Was A’rising" (Darin, Raim) – 2:44

== Personnel ==
- Bobby Darin – vocals
- Walter Raim – arrangements
- Tom Morgan - producer
