= For Teenagers Only =

Studio album by Bobby Darin
- Released: September 1960
- Genre: Rock and roll
- Label: Atco
- Producer: Ahmet Ertegün

Bobby Darin chronology
Darin at the Copa (1960)	For Teenagers Only (1960)	The 25th Day of December (1960)

For Teenagers Only is an album by American singer Bobby Darin, released in 1960. After Darin's success in the adult pop market, the release of the album was an attempt to regain his youthful Rock & Roll audience. Nearly all of the material had been previously recorded in 1958. The album did not chart on the Billboard 200, but reached #38 on the Cashbox mono chart.

== Reception ==
Professional ratings
Review scores
Source	Rating
Allmusic	3/5 stars
New Record Mirror	4/5
The Encyclopedia of Popular Music	3/5 stars

In his Allmusic review, critic John Bush called the album "a very strange beast, with a few of the bluesy uptempo numbers that Darin had done so well with during the late '50s... Teenagers weren't biting, however, and the LP languished without even a whimper on the charts."

Music Vendor wrote Darin "offers irresistible performances of several upbeat swingers including, 'Want You With Me', 'Keep A Walkin’, 'and Somebody To Love'."

== Track listing ==
1. "I Want You with Me" (Woody Harris) – 2:19
2. "Keep a Walkin'" (Howard Greenfield, Neil Sedaka) – 1:53
3. "You Know How" (Bobby Darin) – 2:04
4. "Somebody to Love" (Bobby Darin) – 2:15
5. "I Ain't Sharin' Sharon" (Doc Pomus, Mort Shuman) – 2:11
6. "Pity Miss Kitty" (Woody Harris) – 2:07
7. "That Lucky Old Sun" (Haven Gillespie, Beasley Smith) – 2:39
8. "All the Way Home" (Otis Blackwell, Luther Dixon) – 1:52
9. "You Never Called" (Woody Harris) – 2:06
10. "A Picture Nobody Could Paint" (Aaron Schroeder) – 2:15
11. "Hush, Somebody's Calling My Name" (Belford Hendricks, Clyde Otis, Cynthia Young) – 1:55
12. "Here I'll Stay" (Alan Jay Lerner, Kurt Weill) – 2:17

== Personnel ==
- Bobby Darin – vocals
- Tom Dowd – engineer
- Curt Gunther - cover photography
