= Inside Out (Bobby Darin album) =

Album by Bobby Darin

Studio album by Bobby Darin
- Released: 1967
- Recorded: March 7 & 10, 1967
- Genre: Folk
- Label: Atco
- Producer: Charles Koppelman, Don Rubin

Bobby Darin chronology
If I Were a Carpenter (1966)	Inside Out (1967)	Bobby Darin Sings Doctor Dolittle (1967)

Inside Out is a 1967 album by Bobby Darin. This album found Darin continuing to explore the folk genre, as he had on his previous release, If I Were a Carpenter. Like its predecessor, Inside Out contains songs by Tim Hardin and John Sebastian, as well as Randy Newman and The Rolling Stones.

Inside Out was reissued in 1998 on the Diablo label combined with Darin's previous release, If I Were a Carpenter.

== Reception ==
Professional ratings
Review scores
Source	Rating
Allmusic	2/5 stars
The Encyclopedia of Popular Music	3/5 stars

Music critic Richie Unterberger wrote in his Allmusic review "It's not bad, but there are better versions than these songs; the arrangements are a little too syrupy, the singing is okay but not brilliant, some of the songs are too lightweight, and the overall mood is too damned unrelentingly understated."

== Track listing ==
=== Side one ===
1. "The Lady Came from Baltimore" (Tim Hardin) - 1:53
2. "Darling Be Home Soon" (John Sebastian) - 3:00
3. "Bes' Friends" (John Sebastian) - 1:35
4. "I Am" (Bobby Darin) - 1:54
5. "About You" (Garry Bonner, Alan Gordon) - 2:21
6. "I Think It's Gonna Rain Today" (Randy Newman) - 2:50

=== Side two ===
1. "Whatever Happened to Happy" (Garry Bonner, Alan Gordon) - 2:01
2. "Black Sheep Boy" (Tim Hardin) - 1:53
3. "Hello Sunshine" (Bobby Darin) - 2:19
4. "Lady Fingers" (Garry Bonner, Alan Gordon) - 2:21
5. "Back Street Girl" (Mick Jagger, Keith Richards) - 3:40
