= The 25th Day of December =

Studio album by Bobby Darin
- Released: October 1960
- Recorded: August 18–21, 1960
- Genre: Christmas
- Length: 32:44
- Label: Atco
- Producer: Ahmet Ertegün

Bobby Darin chronology
For Teenagers Only (1960)	The 25th Day of December (1960)	Two of a Kind (1961)

The 25th Day of December is a Christmas album by American singer Bobby Darin, released in 1960.

== Reception ==
Professional ratings
Review scores
Source	Rating
Allmusic	3/5 stars
The Encyclopedia of Popular Music	3/5 stars
The New Rolling Stone Album Guide	4/5 stars
MusicHound	2/5 stars

In his Allmusic review, critic Dennis MacDonald praised the American spirituals included on the album but wrote "On the hymns, however, Darin is lost in syrupy arrangements."

Billboard in its Spotlight of the Week album reviews stated that "The spiritual efforts range from "Go Tell It on the Mountain" and "Mary Where Is Your Baby," to "Child of God."

== Track listing ==
All songs Traditional unless otherwise noted.

1. "O Come All Ye Faithful" (Frederick Oakeley, John Reading, John Francis Wade) – 2:25
2. "Poor Little Jesus" (Paul Campbell, Ronnie Gilbert, Lee Hays, Fred Hellerman, Pete Seeger, Traditional) – 3:03
3. "Child of God" – 2:03
4. "Baby Born Today" – 1:30
5. "Holy Holy Holy" – 2:47
6. "Ave Maria" – 4:00
7. "Go Tell It on the Mountain" (John Wesley Work, Jr., Traditional) – 1:54
8. "While Shepherds Watched Their Flocks" – 2:12
9. "Jehovah Hallelujah" – 2:16
10. "Mary, Where Is Your Baby?" – 1:50
11. "Silent Night, Holy Night" (Franz Gruber, Joseph Mohr) – 3:51
12. "Dona Nobis Pacem" – 1:52
13. "Amen" – 0:58
14. "Christmas Auld Lang Syne" (Manny Kurtz, Frances Philip Military) – 2:43

== Personnel ==
- Bobby Darin – vocals
- Bill Putnam – engineer
- Bobby Scott – arranger, conductor
