= Things and Other Things =

Studio album by Bobby Darin
- Released: July 1962
- Recorded: 1958–1962
- Genre: Pop
- Length: 28:03
- Label: Atco
- Producer: Ahmet Ertegün

Bobby Darin chronology
| Bobby Darin Sings Ray Charles (1962) | Things and Other Things (1962) | Oh! Look at Me Now (1962) |

Singles from Things and Other Things
- 1. "Things" Released: June 1962

Things and Other Things is a studio album by American singer Bobby Darin, released in July 1962.

The album debuted on the Billboard Top LPs chart in the issue dated October 6, 1962, and remained on the chart for ten weeks, peaking at number 45. It debuted on the Cashbox albums chart in the issue dated October 6, 1962, and remained on the chart for a total of three weeks, peaking at number 43.

The single "Things", debuted on the Billboard Hot 100 in the issue dated July 7, 1962, and peaked at number two during an 12-week stay on the chart. The song peaked at number two on the UK singles chart in a 17-weeks stay. It reached number ten on the Cashbox singles chart and stayed on the chart for 12 weeks.

The album was reissued on CD in 2003 by Collectors' Choice, and in 2010 it was included in a box set entitled Original Album Series, containing five of his studio albums.

== Background ==
Darin had left Atco Records for Capitol when Things and Other Things was released. The songs were taken from different sessions, some of which date back over four years."I'll Be There" was the only Darin original covered by Elvis Presley. "Theme from 'Come September'" comes from the film of the same name, which starred Darin and his future wife Sandra Dee.

== Reception ==
Professional ratings
Review scores
| Source | Rating |
|---|---|
| AllMusic | 4/5 stars |
| The Encyclopedia of Popular Music | 3/5 stars |

In his AllMusic review, critic Lindsay Palmer wrote "...the artist's popularity would turn this seemingly monetarily-motivated odds and sods collection into a relatively successful package for the label. The dozen songs were taken from practically as many different sessions, some of which date back over a four-year span (1958 -- 1961)... Although stylistically eclectic, the material hangs together to offer an overview of the musical diversity that had become one of his strongest suits."

Cashbox stated that Darin's "wide-range vocal talents carry him in good stead on eleven top-rung teen- angled tracks such as “I’ll Be There,” “Lost Love” and “Nature Boy.”

== Track listing ==
All songs by Bobby Darin unless otherwise noted.

1. "Things" (1962 single) – 2:35
2. "I'll Be There" (B-side of "Bill Bailey", 1960) – 2:10
3. "Lost Love" (Darin, Don Kirshner) (B-side of "Queen of the Hop", 1958) – 2:31
4. "Look For My True Love" (B-side of "Nature Boy", 1961) – 1:59
5. "Beachcomber" (1960 single) – 2:16
6. "Now We're One" (B-side of "Early in the Morning", 1958) – 2:15
7. "You're Mine" (B-side of "Mighty Mighty Man", 1958) – 2:09
8. "Oo-Ee-Train" (B-side of "Lazy River", 1960) – 2:07
9. "Jailer Bring Me Water" (B-side of "Things", 1962) – 2:20
10. "Nature Boy" (eden ahbez) (1961 single) – 2:35
11. "Theme From Come September" (1961 single) – 2:35
12. "Sorrow Tomorrow" (Doc Pomus, Mort Shuman) (B-side of "You Must Have Been a Beautiful Baby", 1961) – 2:31

== Charts ==
=== Album ===
| Chart (1963) | Peak position |
|---|---|
| U.S. Top LPs (Billboard) | 45 |
| U.S. Cashbox | 43 |

=== Singles ===
| Year | Title | U.S. Hot 100 | UK | U.S. Cashbox |
|---|---|---|---|---|
| 1962 | "Things" | 3 | 2 | 10 |

== Personnel ==
- Bobby Darin – vocals, piano
