= Bobby Darin Sings Doctor Dolittle =

Studio album by Bobby Darin
- Released: August 1967
- Recorded: July 24, 1967
- Genre: Pop
- Label: Atlantic
- Producer: Ahmet Ertegün

Bobby Darin chronology
Inside Out (1967)	Bobby Darin Sings Doctor Dolittle (1967)	Bobby Darin Born Walden Robert Cassotto (1968)

Singles from Bobby Darin Sings Doctor Dolittle
- 1. "Talk To The Animals" Released: July 1967

Bobby Darin Sings Doctor Dolittle is a studio album by American singer Bobby Darin, released in July 1967. It was arranged and conducted by Roger Kellaway. The album sold poorly, received little label promotion and was subsequently dropped from the label's catalog. This, in part, was to blame for Darin's separation from Atlantic and the beginning of his own label, Direction.

The album was released on compact disc by Edsel Records on August 13, 2007, paired with Darin's 1968 album Bobby Darin Born Walden Robert Cassotto.

== Reception ==
Professional ratings
Review scores
Source	Rating
Allmusic	2.5/5 stars
The Encyclopedia of Popular Music	1/5 stars
Record Mirror	4/5 stars

Music critic JT Griffith wrote in his Allmusic review "Not an essential Darin album, even to crazed fans. The songs are solid but the material is (obviously) neither his most weighty nor his most fun... One of the few genuine missteps in Darin's career."

Billboard in its Pop Spotlight Album Reviews, stated "[Darin] has captured the flavor of the [Film] score, while adding his special touch"

Cashbox notes that Darin "gives the music and lyrics a fresh, original interpretation."

Variety mentions that "Most tunes are down-tempo, but a few samples are well-paced.

Record Mirror thought the album was "a fine record", and claimed "The brilliant Leslie Bricusse tunes from "Dr, Dolittle" are given an original Bobby Darin treatment on this album"

== Track listing ==
All songs written by Leslie Bricusse

=== Side one ===
1. "At the Crossroads" – 2:34
2. "When I Look in Your Eyes" – 2:56
3. "I Think I Like You" – 2:21
4. "Where Are the Words" – 2:48
5. "Something in Your Smile" – 3:30

=== Side two ===
1. "Fabulous Places" – 2:37
2. "My Friend, the Doctor" – 2:59
3. "Beautiful Things" – 2:26
4. "After Today" – 3:01
5. "Talk to the Animals" – 3:18

== Personnel ==
- Bobby Darin – vocals
- Roger Kellaway – arranger, conductor
- John Haeny – recording engineer
- Haig Adishian - album design
- Studio Five - cover photograph
