= Two of a Kind (Bobby Darin and Johnny Mercer album) =

1961 studio album by Bobby Darin and Johnny Mercer

Studio album by Bobby Darin
- Released: April 1961
- Recorded: August 13, 14, 17 & 22 1960
- Studio: United (Hollywood)
- Genre: Pop
- Length: 35:19
- Label: Atco
- Producer: Ahmet Ertegün

Bobby Darin chronology
The 25th Day of December (1960)	Two of a Kind (1961)	The Bobby Darin Story (1961)

Two of a Kind is an album by American singer Bobby Darin and singer/composer Johnny Mercer, released in 1961. It was arranged and conducted by Billy May. The LP was recorded over four dates in August 1960, with several songs recorded on more than one occasion, and three songs not released on the album at all. In 2017, the Omnivore label released an extended version of the album, containing five alternate takes and two of the previously unreleased songs. "Back in Your Own Back Yard" remains unreleased.

Most of the songs recorded were of a novelty nature, although a couple of songs co-authored by Mercer were also included, but even these are not the jazz standards for which Mercer is probably best remembered. The title song was a Johnny Mercer composition that Darin contributed extra lyrics to, prompting Mercer to give him a full co-author credit.

Darin would revive some of the songs from the album later in his career. "Ace in the Hole" was re-recorded by him for the unreleased-at-the-time The Curtain Falls live album, recorded in Las Vegas in 1963. A solo studio version of the song was recorded in late 1965, but it went unreleased at the time and is now thought to be lost. Both the "Paddlin' Madelin Home/Row, Row, Row" medley and the title song were performed by Darin on TV in the early 1970s.

Two of a Kind was included in a box set entitled Four Classic Albums Plus Box Set, which contains 3 of his studio albums, 1 compilation, and was released on July 1, 2016.

== Reception ==
Professional ratings
Review scores
Source	Rating
Allmusic	4.5/5 stars
The Encyclopedia of Popular Music	3/5 stars
The New Rolling Stone Album Guide	3/5 stars
MusicHound	4/5 stars

Variety wrote that "Johnny Mercer, who is 27 years older than Bobby Darin, has got a vocal verve that excellently complements the youngster's piping pyrotechnics. Together they bring an unusual bounce and delightful casual flavour to a snappy disc production. The mood is jovial and bright and the sock standard repertoire has appeal for adult as well as juves."

In his Allmusic review, critic Richard S. Ginell wrote "Give a pair of medals and hefty raises to the two fellows at Atlantic who thought of pairing Bobby Darin—then 24—and Johnny Mercer—then 51—and backing them with the charts of Billy May... The music world hadn't heard this brand of impeccably timed, back-and-forth joshing since the heyday of Hope and Crosby (or perhaps Mercer and Crosby)—or the inspired Nashville rivalry of Red Foley and Ernest Tubb. Don't miss it."

== Track listing ==
1. "Two of a Kind" (Walden Cassotto, Johnny Mercer) – 0:49
2. "(Back Home Again In) Indiana" (James F. Hanley, Ballard MacDonald) – 2:40
3. "Bob White (Whatcha Gonna Swing Tonight?)" (Bernie Hanighen, Mercer) – 3:37
4. "Ace in the Hole" (James Dempsey, George Mitchell) – 3:09
5. "East of the Rockies" (Sydney Robin, Lou Singer) – 2:49
6. "If I Had My Druthers" (Gene DePaul, Mercer) – 3:58
7. "I Ain't Gonna Give Nobody None O' This Jelly Roll" (Clarence Williams, Spencer Williams) – 1:48
8. "Lonesome Polecat" (DePaul, Mercer) – 3:28
9. "My Cutey's Due at Two-to-Two Today" (Irving Bibo, Leo Robin, Albert Von Tilzer) – 2:23
10. "Medley: Paddlin' Madelin' Home/Row Row Row" (William Jerome, James V. Monaco, Harry Woods) – 1:55
11. "Who Takes Care of the Caretaker's Daughter?" (Chick Endor, Paul Specht) – 3:10
12. "Mississippi Mud" (Harry Barris, James Cavanaugh) – 1:56
13. "Two of a Kind" (Cassotto, Mercer) – 3:41

The 2017 reissue has the following track listing:

1. "Two of a Kind" (Walden Cassotto, Johnny Mercer) – 0:49
2. "(Back Home Again In) Indiana" (James F. Hanley, Ballard MacDonald) – 2:40
3. "Bob White (Whatcha Gonna Swing Tonight?)" (Bernie Hanighen, Mercer) – 3:37
4. "Ace in the Hole" (James Dempsey, George Mitchell) – 3:09
5. "East of the Rockies" (Sydney Robin, Lou Singer) – 2:49
6. "If I Had My Druthers" (Gene DePaul, Mercer) – 3:58
7. "I Ain't Gonna Give Nobody None O' This Jelly Roll" (Clarence Williams, Spencer Williams) – 1:48
8. "Lonesome Polecat" (DePaul, Mercer) – 3:28
9. "My Cutey's Due at Two-to-Two Today" (Irving Bibo, Leo Robin, Albert Von Tilzer) – 2:23
10. "Medley: Paddlin' Madelin' Home/Row Row Row" (William Jerome, James V. Monaco, Harry Woods) – 1:55
11. "Who Takes Care of the Caretaker's Daughter?" (Chick Endor, Paul Specht) – 3:10
12. "Mississippi Mud" (Harry Barris, James Cavanaugh) – 1:56
13. "Two of a Kind" (Cassotto, Mercer) – 3:41
14. "Cecilia" (Dave Dreyer, Ruby Herman) (take 4)
15. "Lily of Laguna" (Leslie Stuart) (take 7)
16. "Bob White (Whatcha Gonna Swing Tonight?)" (Bernie Hanighen, Mercer) (take 17)
17. "East of the Rockies" (Sydney Robin, Lou Singer) (take 6)
18. "I Ain't Gonna Give Nobody None O' This Jelly Roll" (Clarence Williams, Spencer Williams) (Take 5A)
19. "My Cutey's Due at Two-to-Two Today" (Irving Bibo, Leo Robin, Albert Von Tilzer) (take 10)
20. "Mississippi Mud" (Harry Barris, James Cavanaugh) (alternate take)

== Personnel ==
- Bobby Darin – vocals
- Johnny Mercer – vocals
- Milt Raskin – piano
- George Van Eps – guitar
- Morty Corb – bass guitar
- Ronnie Zito – drums
- Manny Klein, Dick Catchart, John Best, Conrad Gozzo – trumpet
- Ed Kusby, Bill Schaefer, Elmer Schneider – trombone
- Wilber Schwartz, Skeets Herfurt, Eddie Miller, Chuck Gentry – saxophone
- Bill Putnam – engineer
- Billy May – piano, arranger, conductor
