= Bobby Darin Born Walden Robert Cassotto =

Studio album by Bobby Darin
- Released: September 1968
- Genre: Folk rock
- Length: 31:00
- Label: Direction
- Producer: Bobby Darin

Bobby Darin chronology
Bobby Darin Sings Doctor Dolittle (1967)	Bobby Darin Born Walden Robert Cassotto (1968)	Commitment (1969)

Bobby Darin Born Walden Robert Cassotto is an album by American singer Bobby Darin, released in 1968 on Darin's own label, Direction, just one month after the formation of the label was announced in the trade press. That article stated that "his first LP is controversial in the sense that it establishes a new image. The songs are built on Darin's feeling for people and his concern for a troubled society."

Bobby Darin Born Walden Robert Cassotto is the first of only two albums containing all-Darin compositions (the other is the follow-up, Commitment), and was originally released in a gatefold sleeve containing the lyrics to the songs on the inside and some of Darin's poetry and musings on the back. The album did not chart, although "Long Line Rider", which was about the corruption in Arkansas prison farms uncovered by Tom Murton, reached number 79 on the singles charts.

Other songs on the album dealt with issues such as the environment ("Questions"), the Vietnam War ("The Proper Gander"), capitalism ("Jingle Jangle Jungle") and organized religion ("Sunday"). The final song, "In Memoriam", featuring just Darin and an acoustic guitar, finds the singer/songwriter recounting the events of the funeral of Robert Kennedy. It is said that Darin was the last to leave the graveside, and it was Kennedy's death that was largely responsible for Darin starting the Direction label.

The album was released on compact disc by Edsel Records on August 13, 2007, paired with Darin's 1967 album Bobby Darin Sings Doctor Dolittle.

== Reception ==
Professional ratings
Review scores
Source	Rating
Allmusic	2/5 stars
The Encyclopedia of Popular Music	3/5 stars

Cash Box wrote of the Long Line Rider single: "completely different from anything Bobby Darin has done, this side pulled from the progressive-showing LP casts a new figure from the B. D. mold. Cooking blues backup invigorates a fascinating lyric centred on a chain-gang worker. Effort should see both underground and top forty exposure to open a solid sales spree."

Larry Uttal, president of Bell Records (who distributed the album) said that the LP "reveals a side of Bobby Darin's personality that has never been heard by the public before. And it will no doubt surprise some listeners, because the total effect of the album poignantly passes on to them Darin's sense of personal involvement in the world today. Darin's material and performance runs much deeper than the type of music that, up to now, has been his signature. The album expresses the personality of a mature artist in a perfectly realized creative whole."

Billboard said that the music "sounds like a cross between The Lovin' Spoonful and Jerry Jeff (Mr Bojangles) Walker."

Cash Box said that "these songs show Darin to be a talented writer; given the right promotion, this album could be the biggest thing he's ever done."

Variety noted that Darin "has completely dropped his cafe manner for a sound as contemporary as the material."

In the UK, The Observer newspaper wrote that the album "has more beauty and sensitivity than a score of others."

Music critic JT Griffith wrote in his Allmusic review "The least-essential record to casual fans. But possibly the most important Darin record for those who wish to better understand the man's love for music and his quest for artistic truth... An overlooked masterpiece painted in bold, personal strokes."

== Track listing ==
All songs by Bobby Darin.

=== Side one ===
1. "Questions" – 4:30
2. "Jingle Jangle Jungle" – 2:55
3. "The Proper Gander" – 3:56
4. "Bullfrog" – 4:02
5. "Long Line Rider" – 2:57

=== Side two ===
1. "Change" – 2:22
2. "I Can See the Wind" – 3:07
3. "Sunday" – 3:22
4. "In Memoriam" – 4:00

== Personnel ==
- Bobby Darin – vocals, arrangements, photography
