= Bobby Darin (album) =

Studio album by Bobby Darin
- Released: September 1958
- Genre: Rock and roll
- Length: 26:16
- Label: Atco
- Producer: Herb Abramson; Ahmet Ertegun

Bobby Darin chronology
Bobby Darin (1958)	That's All (1959)

Singles from Bobby Darin
- 1. "Million Dollar Baby" Released: 1957; 2. "Don't Call My Name" Released: 1957; 3. "Just in Case You Change Your Mind" Released: February 1958; 4. "Splish Splash" Released: May 19, 1958

Bobby Darin is the debut studio album by American singer Bobby Darin, released in September 1958, by Atco Records.

The single from this album, "Splish Splash", debuted on the Billboard Hot 100 in the issue dated June 23, 1958, and peaked at number three during a 15-week stay on the chart. The song peaked at number 18 on the UK singles chart in a seven-week stay. It reached number two on the Cashbox singles chart and stayed on the chart for 15 weeks. and number 14 on the C&W Best Sellers in Stores chart during its three-week stay.

Bobby Darin was included in a box set entitled Original Album Series, which contains five of his studio albums, and was released on March 1, 2010.

== Critical reception ==
Professional ratings
Review scores
Source	Rating
AllMusic	3.5/5 stars
The Encyclopedia of Popular Music	4/5 stars
The New Rolling Stone Album Guide	3.5/5 stars

Andrew Hamilton from AllMusic wrote that "somebody tried to remake Darin into a young Dean Martin and failed".

Variety notes that Darin has "a rhythm drive that [fits] right in the current market groove and he knows how to gives the oldies a twist that will appeal to his teenage fans."

== Track listing ==
Bobby Darin – Side one
No.	Title	Writer(s)	Length
1.	"Splish Splash"	Bobby Darin; Jean Murray	2:12
2.	"Just in Case You Change Your Mind"	Harry Patterson; Melvin Bell; Deek Watson	2:07
3.	"Pretty Betty"	Darin; Don Kirshner	1:40
4.	"Talk to Me Something"	Darin; Kirshner	2:16
5.	"Judy, Don't Be Moody"	Ben Raleigh; Don Wolf	2:14
6.	"(Since You're Gone) I Can't Go On"	Doc Pomus; Mort Shuman	2:43
Total length:			13:12

Bobby Darin – Side two
No.	Title	Writer(s)	Length
1.	"I Found a Million Dollar Baby (in a Five and Ten Cent Store)"	Billy Rose; Mort Dixon; Harry Warren	2:00
2.	"Wear My Ring"	Darin; Kirshner	1:50
3.	"So Mean"	Darin; Kirshner	2:35
4.	"Don't Call My Name"	Darin; Kirshner	1:58
5.	"Brand New House"	Darin; Woody Harris	2:30
6.	"Actions Speak Louder Than Words"	Roquel Davis; Berry Gordy, Jr.	2:11
Total length:			13:04
