= Bobby Darin Sings Ray Charles =

Studio album by Bobby Darin
- Released: March 1962
- Genre: Rhythm and blues
- Length: 36:17
- Label: Atco
- Producer: Ahmet Ertegün

Bobby Darin chronology
Twist with Bobby Darin (1961)	Bobby Darin Sings Ray Charles (1962)	Things and Other Things (1962)

Singles from Bobby Darin SIngs Ray Charles
- 1. "What'd I Say" Released: March 1962

Bobby Darin Sings Ray Charles is a studio album by American singer Bobby Darin, released in March 1962 by Atco Records. and arranged by Jimmie Haskell.

The album debuted on the Billboard Top LPs chart in the issue dated May 12, 1962, and remained on the chart for 11 weeks, peaking at number 96. It also debuted on the Cashbox albums chart in the issue dated April 21, 1962, and remained on the chart for a total of five weeks, peaking at number 41.

The single What'd I Say" part 1, debuted on the Billboard Hot 100 in the issue dated March 31, 1962, and peaked at number 24 during an eight-week stay on the chart. The song peaked at number 26 on the Cashbox singles chart and stayed on the chart for eight weeks.

The album was reissued on CD in 2004, and in 2010 it was included in a box set entitled Original Album Series, which contains five of his studio albums.

== Background ==
Darin recorded the album as a tribute to Ray Charles. His version of "What'd I Say" earned a Grammy nomination for Best Rhythm and Blues Recording. Guest soloists included Nino Tempo, Plas Johnson and Darlene Love. Darin said, "I'm proud to say that I was on the Ray Charles bandwagon when it was just a baby carriage. In fact, two singers—Fats Domino and Ray Charles—opened up my ears to a whole new world, different from anything I'd heard until then. They both became major influences when I realized these are the roots."

== Reception ==
Professional ratings
Review scores
Source	Rating
AllMusic	3/5 stars
The Encyclopedia of Popular Music	3/5 stars
New Record Mirror	5/5 stars

In a review for AllMusic, critic JT Griffith wrote "In addition to the rocking "What'd I Say," standouts include the swinging testament to love, "I Got a Woman," "Ain't That Love," and "Hallelujah I Love Her So."... A listener can debate if these covers are as good as the originals (could they be?) but not the authenticity that jumps off the turntable."

Billboard praises Darin for "shows off his remarkable veratility with grooving readings of a flocks of Ray Charles' best-known tunes.

Jimmy Watson of New Record Mirror praises Darin's "for his vocal tribute to Ray Charles."

== Track listing ==
All songs by Ray Charles unless otherwise noted.

1. "What'd I Say" – 4:08
2. "I Got a Woman" (Charles, Renald Richard) – 6:34
3. "Tell All the World About You" (Charles, Percy Mayfield) – 1:54
4. "Tell Me How Do You Feel" – 2:50
5. "My Bonnie" – 2:33
6. "The Right Time" (Lew Herman) – 3:28
7. "Hallelujah I Love Her So" – 2:51
8. "Leave My Woman Alone" – 3:16
9. "Ain't That Love" – 2:57
10. "Drown in My Own Tears" (Henry Glover) – 3:23
11. "That's Enough" – 2:23

== Grammy nominations ==
This album brought the fourth and fifth Grammy nominations that Darin received over the course of his career, with one in the category for Best Rhythm & Blues Recording for the song "What'd I Say."

== Charts ==
=== Album ===
Chart (1962)	Peak position
U.S. Top LPs (Billboard)	96
U.S. Cashbox	41

=== Singles ===
Year	Title	U.S. Hot 100	U.S. Cashbox
1962	"What'd I Say"	24	26

== Personnel ==
- Bobby Darin – vocals
- Nino Tempo, Plas Johnson – saxophone
- Darlene Love – vocals (on "The Right Time")
- The Blossoms – backing vocals
- Jimmie Haskell – arrangements
