= 18 Yellow Roses =

Studio album by Bobby Darin
- Released: July 1963
- Recorded: 1963
- Genre: Country
- Length: 29:07
- Label: Capitol
- Producer: Nick Venet

Bobby Darin chronology
It's You or No One (1963)	18 Yellow Roses (1963)	Earthy! (1963)

Singles from 18 Yellow Roses
- 1. "18 Yellow Roses" Released: May 6, 1963

18 Yellow Roses is a studio album by American singer Bobby Darin, released in July 1963. It was produced by Nik Venet and featured several arrangers, including Walter Raim. The album debuted on the Billboard Top LPs chart in the issue dated August 24, 1963, and remained on the chart for five weeks, peaking at number 96. It debuted on the Cashbox albums chart in the issue dated July 20, 1963, remaining on that chart for a total of seven weeks and hitting a peak position of number 69.

== Overview ==
The album's title track debuted on the Billboard Hot 100 in the issue dated May 11, 1963, peaking at number 10 during a ten-week run, and debuted on the magazine's Easy Listening chart May 25, peaking at number 5 during a seven-week run. The track debuted on the Cashbox singles chart in the issue dated May 11, 1963, peaking at number 12 during an eleven-week run. it spent a week on the U.S. Hot Rhythm & Blues Singles charts dated July 6, 1963, and peaked at number 29. Other songs on the album include covers of recent hits, such as "On Broadway", "Can't Get Used to Losing You" and "Our Day Will Come".

18 Yellow Roses was released on compact disc by Exemplar in 2002 as tracks 13 through 24 on a pairing of two albums on one CD, with tracks 1 through 12 containing the album You're the Reason I'm Living (1963).

== Reception ==
Professional ratings
Review scores
Source	Rating
AllMusic	2/5 stars
Record Mirror	4/5 stars
The Encyclopedia of Popular Music	3/5 stars
Disc	5/5 stars

In his AllMusic review, critic Richie Unterberger praised the single "18 Yellow Roses" and its B-side "Not for Me", but generally panned the rest of the album, writing "otherwise '18 Yellow Roses' sounds like a bit of a rush job rather than an artistic statement."

Billboard in its Pop Spotlight Album Pick reviews, stated that "the arrangements sparkle and [Bobby Darin] is at his best."

Cashbox described the album as "One of the best sets that [Darin] has cut in quite a while."

Variety said that the album "gives Bobby Darin a chance to cut loose on a set of pop hits of recent vintage."

Hunter Nigel of Disc described the album as "a memorable LP even for Mr. D."

Record Mirror notes Darin "has taken a bunch of the best sellers of recent times and given them his own distinctive treatment."

== Track listing ==
1. "18 Yellow Roses" (Bobby Darin) – 2:19
2. "On Broadway" (Jerry Leiber, Barry Mann, Mike Stoller, Cynthia Weil) – 2:37
3. "Ruby Baby" (Leiber, Stoller) – 2:16
4. "Reverend Mr. Black" (Leiber, Stoller, Billy Edd Wheeler) – 2:54
5. "End of the World" (Sylvia Dee, Arthur Kent) – 2:36
6. "Not for Me" (Darin) – 2:22
7. "Walk Right In" (Gus Cannon, Hosea Woods) – 2:33
8. "From a Jack to a King" (Ned Miller) – 1:57
9. "I Will Follow Her" (Arthur Altman, Norman Gimbel, Jacques Plante, Del Roma, J. W. Stole) – 2:29
10. "Our Day Will Come" (Mort Garson, Bob Hilliard) – 2:46
11. "Can't Get Used to Losing You" (Doc Pomus, Mort Shuman) – 2:12
12. "Rhythm of the Rain" (John Gummoe) – 2:06

== Charts ==
=== Album ===
Chart (1963)	Peak position
U.S. Top LPs (Billboard)	96
U.S. Cashbox	69

=== Singles ===
Year	Title	US Hot 100	US AC	US Cashbox	UK	US Hot R&B
1963	"18 Yellow Roses"	10	5	12	37	29

== Personnel ==
- Bobby Darin – vocals
- Jack Nitzsche – arranger, conductor
