= It's You or No One =

Studio album by Bobby Darin
- Released: June 1963
- Recorded: 1960
- Genre: Pop
- Length: 33:31
- Label: Atco
- Producer: Torrie Zito, Bobby Scott

Bobby Darin chronology
| You're the Reason I'm Living (1963) | It's You or No One (1963) | 18 Yellow Roses (1963) |

It's You or No One is a studio album by American singer Bobby Darin, released in June 1963.

Darin had left Atco for Capitol Records, but left this album unreleased since it was recorded in 1960. The first side was arranged by Torrie Zito, with the second arranged by Bobby Scott. The swinging first side makes little use of the brass section, while the slow second side has the feel of a chamber orchestra and no use of percussion at all. As with Darin's previous albums of standards, the album is a mix of well-known songs and obscurities, including three numbers written by Libby Holden, about whom very little is known.

== Reception ==
Professional ratings
Review scores
| Source | Rating |
|---|---|
| AllMusic | 3/5 stars |
| The Encyclopedia of Popular Music | 3/5 stars |
| Billboard | 4/5 stars |
| Disc | 4/5 stars |

In a review for AllMusic, critic JT Griffith wrote "Like Love Swings, It's You or No One is upbeat first and melancholy "the morning after. ...Familiar territory for Darin, but filled with moving, solid interpretations."

Cash Box referred to it as a "sure-fire sales item."

Nigel Hunter of Disc notes "There are strings on hand to sigh softly in the background aud occasinoally on the fun side a gentle ... swing from the rhythm section.

== Track listing ==
1. "It's You or No One" (Sammy Cahn, Jule Styne) – 3:25
2. "I Hadn't Anyone Till You" (Ray Noble) – 2:39
3. "Not Mine" (Johnny Mercer, Victor Schertzinger) – 2:09
4. "I Can't Believe That You're in Love with Me" (Clarence Gaskill, Jimmy McHugh) – 2:24
5. "I've Never Been in Love Before" (Frank Loesser) – 2:00
6. "All or Nothing at All" (Arthur Altman, Jack Lawrence) – 2:15
7. "Only One Little Item" (Libby Holden) – 3:58
8. "Don't Get Around Much Anymore" (Duke Ellington, Bob Russell) – 2:50
9. "How About Me?" (Irving Berlin) – 2:57
10. "I'll Be Around" (Alec Wilder) – 2:47
11. "All I Do Is Cry" (Libby Holden) – 2:43
12. "I Guess I'm Good for Nothing But the Blues" (Libby Holden) – 3:24

== Personnel ==
- Bobby Darin – vocals
- Torrie Zito – arranger, conductor
- Bobby Scott – arranger, conductor
