= Things (Bobby Darin song) =

1962 Bobby Darin song

Single by Bobby Darin

from the album Things and Other Things
- B-side: "Jailer Bring Me Water"
- Released: June 1962
- Recorded: June 19, 1961
- Length: 2:33
- Label: Atco 6299
- Songwriter: Bobby Darin
- Producer: Ahmet Ertegun

Bobby Darin singles chronology
"What'd I Say (Part 1)" (1962)	"Things" (1962)	"Baby Face" (1962)

"Things" is a song which was written and recorded by Bobby Darin in 1962. Released as a single, it reached No. 3 in the US and Canada, No. 2 in the UK, and No. 3 in the first-ever official Irish Singles Chart, published by RTÉ in October 1962. It was later covered by Ronnie Dove and became a Top 30 country hit for him.

In 1962, Darin began to write and sing country music, with hit songs including "Things". It was the final Darin single released on the Atco Records unit of Atlantic Records before he began recording for Capitol Records. While vault material would continue to be issued on Atco, Darin wouldn't return to Atlantic Records until 1965.

Darin's next hits after "Things" were "You're the Reason I'm Living" (US No. 3), and "18 Yellow Roses" (US No. 10) on Capitol Records, which Darin joined in 1962 (he returned to Atlantic four years later).

== Chart history ==
=== Weekly charts ===
Chart (1962)	Peak position
Canada (CHUM Hit Parade)	3
Ireland (IRMA)	3
New Zealand (Lever Hit Parade)	5
UK Singles (OCC)	2
US Billboard Hot 100	3
US Cash Box Top 100	10

=== Year-end charts ===
Chart (1962)	Rank
US Billboard Hot 100	62
UK	21

== Ronnie Dove version ==
"Things"

Single by Ronnie Dove

from the album New Old-Fashioned Love
- B-side: "Here We Go Again"
- Released: May 1975
- Recorded: 1975
- Genre: Country
- Length: 2:30
- Label: Melodyland
- Songwriter: Bobby Darin
- Producer: Ken Revercomb for Mike Curb Productions

Ronnie Dove singles chronology
"Please Come to Nashville" (1975)	"Things" (1975)	"Drina (Take Your Lady Off For Me)" (1975)

In 1975, pop and country singer Ronnie Dove recorded the song for Melodyland Records, Motown’s country label. His version reached No. 25 on the country chart that year, and became Ronnie’s highest charting country hit. It was released on an album called “New Old-Fashioned Love” in 1977, which was released on M.C. Records only as a promotional album sent to radio stations.

Chart (1975)	Peak position
US Billboard Country	25

== Other versions ==
Lawrence Welk surprisingly kept up with the times by allowing Larry Hooper and The Lennon Sisters to sing this song on a season premier show in 1962.

The song was sung as a duet by Dean Martin and Nancy Sinatra in the 1967 TV special Movin' with Nancy, starring Nancy Sinatra. The TV special was released to home video in the US in 2000.

Italian singer Remo Germani made a cover in 1962 called "Baci".

A cover of the song by Anne Murray from her 1976 album Keeping in Touch peaked at No. 12 on the US adult contemporary chart and No. 22 Country.

Jerry Lee Lewis covered the song on his 1995 album Young Blood.

Singer Robbie Williams recorded a version of "Things", with Jane Horrocks, for his 2001 swing album Swing When You're Winning. British rock n roll revivalist band Showaddywaddy covered the song on their 1983 album Living Legends with Bill “Buddy” Gask on lead vocals. Phantom of the Opera film actress Emmy Rossum did a cover of "Things" on her 2013 album Sentimental Journey, which peaked at 92 on the U.S. Billboard 200 chart.
