= Commitment (Bobby Darin album) =

Studio album by Bobby Darin
- Released: July 1969
- Genre: Folk rock, country, rock, country rock
- Length: 31:04
- Label: Direction
- Producer: Bobby Darin

Bobby Darin chronology
| Bobby Darin Born Walden Robert Cassotto (1968) | Commitment (1969) | Bobby Darin (1972) |

Commitment is an album by American singer Bobby Darin (credited as Bob Darin), released in 1969. It was released by Darin's own Direction label and did not chart.

== Reception ==
Professional ratings
Review scores
| Source | Rating |
|---|---|
| Allmusic | 2/5 stars |
| The Encyclopedia of Popular Music | 3/5 stars |

Music critic Richie Unterberger wrote in his Allmusic review "It's a pity... that the album wasn't too good. The backup playing is only functional and perfunctory in a generic late-'60s folk-country-rock fashion, and the songs are neither too melodic nor too incisive in their lyrics, even as Darin was obviously striving for meaning... In spite of its consistent sound and vision, in the context of Darin's entire career it's a curiosity, and not something he did nearly as well as he did pop, rock & roll, swing jazz, or standards."

== Track listing ==
All songs composed and arranged by Bobby Darin (credited as Bob Darin).

=== Side one ===
1. "Me and Mr. Hohner" – 3:10
2. "Sugar Man" – 2:50
3. "Sausalito (The Governors Song)" – 2:25
4. "Song for a Dollar" – 2:45
5. "Harvest" – 3:05

=== Side two ===
1. "Distractions, Pt. 1" – 3:29
2. "Water Color Canvas" – 3:25
3. "Jive" – 2:02
4. "Hey Magic Man" – 4:25
5. "Light Blue" – 3:28

== Personnel ==
- Bobby Darin – vocals, harmonica, keyboards
- Bill Aikins – piano
- Tommy Amato, Larry Devers – drums
- Berry Chapman, Dennis Quitman – bass guitar
- Joey Lemon, Bubba Poythress – guitar

Technical

- Brent Maher – engineer
- Martin Singer - cover photography
