= Beyond the Sea (song) =

1947 English-language version of French song "La mer"

"La Mer"
- Cover of musical score published in France in 1946

Song by Charles Trenet
- Published: 1946 by Les Editions Raoul Breton
- Composer: Charles Trenet

Audio video
- "Beyond the Sea" on YouTube

"Beyond the Sea" is the English-language version of the French song "La Mer" by Charles Trenet, popularized by Bobby Darin in 1959. While the French original was an ode to the sea, Jack Lawrence – who composed the English lyrics – turned it into a love song.

== Versions ==
"Beyond the Sea"

Single by Bobby Darin

from the album That's All
- B-side: "That's the Way Love Is"
- Released: January 1960
- Recorded: August 24, 1958
- Genre: Big band, pop, swing
- Length: 2:48
- Label: Atco 6158
- Songwriter: Charles Trenet/Jack Lawrence

Bobby Darin singles chronology
"Mack the Knife" (1959)	"Beyond the Sea" (1960)	"Clementine" (1960)

Audio video
- "Beyond the Sea" on YouTube

"Beyond the Sea" has been recorded by many artists, but Bobby Darin's version released in late 1959 is the best known, reaching No. 6 on the Billboard Hot 100, No. 15 on the US R&B Chart, No. 7 in Canada (co-charted with "That's The Way Love Is"), and No. 8 in the UK Singles Chart in early 1960.

Before Bobby Darin's version, two instrumental recordings reached the Top 40 of the Billboard Hot 100. Benny Goodman's version charted in 1948, and was featured in the Cary Grant/Betsy Drake romantic comedy Every Girl Should Be Married. Roger Williams' recording reached No. 37 in 1955.

The first recording of "Beyond the Sea" was by Harry James and His Orchestra on December 22, 1947, and the first recording of "La Mer" was by French musician Roland Gerbeau in December 1945 (the song’s author, Charles Trenet, did not record it until the following year).

American R&B singer George Benson recorded an R&B version of the song under the title "Beyond the Sea (La Mer)". It was released on Warner Bros. This version entered the UK Singles Chart on 20 April 1985. It peaked at No. 60 and remained on the chart for three weeks.

Robbie Williams recorded the song for his album Swing When You're Winning, which was used in the closing credits of the 2003 Pixar animated film Finding Nemo.

== Certifications ==
Region	Certification	Certified units/sales
New Zealand (RMNZ)	Gold	15,000^{‡}
United Kingdom (BPI)	Silver	200,000^{‡}
^{‡} Sales+streaming figures based on certification alone.
