= Early in the Morning (Bobby Darin song) =

1958 single by Bobby Darin

Single by Bobby Darin, the Rinky-Dinks

from the album The Bobby Darin Story
- B-side: "Now We're One"
- Released: July 1958
- Recorded: April 24, 1958
- Genre: Rock and roll; rockabilly
- Length: 2:21
- Label: Atco 6121
- Songwriters: Bobby Darin, Woody Harris
- Producer: Dick Jacobs

Bobby Darin, the Rinky-Dinks singles chronology
"Splish Splash" (1958)	"Early in the Morning" (1958)	"Queen of the Hop" (1958)

"Early in the Morning"

Single by Buddy Holly

from the album The Buddy Holly Story
- B-side: "Now We're One"
- Released: July 5, 1958
- Recorded: June 19, 1958
- Genre: Rock and roll; rockabilly
- Length: 2:05
- Label: Coral
- Songwriters: Bobby Darin; Woody Harris
- Producer: Dick Jacobs

Buddy Holly singles chronology
"Rave On" (1958)	"Early in the Morning" (1958)	"Heartbeat" (1958)

"Early in the Morning" is a 1958 song written by Bobby Darin and Woody Harris. It successfully reached the pop and R&B charts in recordings by Darin and Buddy Holly.

== Background ==
Darin brought the song to Brunswick Records, but as he was under contract with Atco Records, a subsidiary of Atlantic Records, Brunswick released a recording of it crediting the "Ding Dongs". New York disc jockeys liked the record, and Atco soon discovered the deception. Brunswick was forced to turn over the masters to Atco, which released the record in 1958, crediting the "Rinky Dinks".

== Cover version ==
A version by Buddy Holly, which reached No. 17, was released by Brunswick (as Coral Records 9-62006), competed in the UK (Coral Q 72333) with Darin's single, which (London 45-HL-E.8679, crediting the Rinky-Dinks); future releases were issued under Darin's name.

== Chart performance ==
- The recording credited to the "Rinky Dinks" peaked at #24 on the pop chart and #8 on the Most Played R&B by Jockeys chart.
- The Buddy Holly recording peaked at #32 on the Billboard Hot 100 and #18 in Canada.
