= If I Were a Carpenter (Bobby Darin album) =

Studio album by Bobby Darin
- Released: Dec 1966
- Genre: Folk rock
- Length: 25:51
- Label: Atlantic
- Producers: Charles Koppelman, Don Rubin

Bobby Darin chronology
In a Broadway Bag (Mame) (1966)	If I Were a Carpenter (1966)	Inside Out (1967)

If I Were a Carpenter is an album by American singer Bobby Darin, released in 1966. It was a significant change in direction for Darin considering his previous album (In a Broadway Bag) was a collection of show tunes.

== History ==
Having previously built his career recording mainstream pop music, Darin's musical output became more "folky" as the 1960s progressed. In 1966, he charted with folksinger Tim Hardin's "If I Were a Carpenter". It was Darin's return to the Top 10 after a four-year absence (the single peaked at No. 8 in the US, and No. 9 in the Cashbox, and the UK in 1966). The tracks leaned heavily towards songs by Hardin and John Sebastian — seven of the songs were written by these two songwriters and Darin's next album would follow a similar process. The song "Red Balloon" had not yet been released by Hardin. It would appear on his album 1967 album Tim Hardin 2. In his Allmusic review, Richie Unterberger, stated "Hardin himself was convinced that Darin had copied his vocal style by listening to his yet-to-be-issued version and the album as a whole boasts a production similar to the orchestrated folk-rock heard on the debut (sic) album in question, though it sounds like an inferior copy." Both Darin's If I Were a Carpenter and Hardin's Tim Hardin 2 were produced by Charles Koppelman and Don Rubin and Koppelman had originally signed Sebastian's band, The Lovin' Spoonful.

The album debuted on the Billboard Top LPs chart in the issue dated February 11, 1967, and remained on the chart for 5 weeks, peaking at number 142. It also debuted on the Cashbox albums chart in the issue dated January 14, 1967, and remained on the chart for a total of 3 weeks, peaking at number 97. Darin's cover of "Lovin' You" reached the No. 32 in the Billboard, and No. 43 in The Cashbox.

If I Were a Carpenter was reissued in 1998 on the Diablo label combined with Darin's next release, Inside Out.

== Reception ==
Professional ratings
Review scores
Source	Rating
Allmusic	2/5 stars
The Encyclopedia of Popular Music	4/5 stars
Record Mirror	4/5 stars

Music critic Richie Unterberger wrote in his Allmusic review "... this is a fair but unexceptional record. Darin falls short of the originals on Buffy St. Marie's "Until It's Time for You to Go" and the Lovin' Spoonful's "Daydream." In fact, aside from "If I Were a Carpenter," the standout is the odd low-charting single "The Girl Who Stood Beside Me," with its odd muted psychedelic bagpipe effects constantly buzzing in the background of an actual fairly strong folk-rock tune."

Billboard stated that Darin "also brings a new spark to the Lovin' Spoonful's "Daydream" and to Tim Hardin's "Don't Make Promises."

Record Mirror noted "His version of 'Until It's Time For You To Go' is lazily, sensually sung, while the five other Time Hardin songs for sung in the usual vocally effected manner."

== Track listing ==
1. "If I Were a Carpenter" (Tim Hardin) – 2:19
2. "Reason to Believe" (Hardin) – 2:03
3. "Sittin' Here Lovin' You" (John Sebastian) – 2:11
4. "Misty Roses" (Hardin) – 2:17
5. "Until It's Time for You to Go" (Buffy Sainte-Marie) – 2:39
6. "For Baby" (John Denver) – 2:24
7. "The Girl Who Stood Beside Me" (Jeffrey Stevens) – 2:26
8. "Red Balloon" (Hardin) – 2:03
9. "Amy" (Bobby Darin) – 2:21
10. "Don't Make Promises" (Hardin) – 2:26
11. "Daydream" (Sebastian) – 2:32

== Personnel ==
- Guitar: Dennis Budimir, Al Casey, David Cohen, Mike Deasy, Don Peake
- Bass guitar: Robert West
- Drums: Hal Blaine
- Keyboards: Larry Knechtel
- Drums, percussion: Jim Gordon
- Percussion: Gary Coleman
- Strings: Jesse Ehrlich, Harry Hyams, Leonard Malarsky, Sid Sharp
