= Oh My Darling, Clementine =

1884 American western folk ballad

"Clementine"
- 1885 sheet music of Clementine attributed to Barker Bradford

Song
- Published: 1884
- Genre: Western folk ballad
- Composer: Unknown
- Lyricist: Percy Montrose

"Oh My Darling, Clementine" (Roud 9611, sometimes simply "Clementine") is a traditional American, tragic but sometimes comic, Western folk ballad in trochaic meter usually credited to Percy Montross (or Montrose) (1884), although it is sometimes credited to Barker Bradford (1885).

Members of the Western Writers of America chose it as one of the Top 100 Western songs of all time.

== Synopsis ==
Oh my darling, Clementine, played on the piano

Multiple variations of the song exist, but all center on Clementine, the daughter of a "miner forty-niner" and the singer's lover. One day, while performing routine chores, Clementine trips and falls into a raging current and drowns, as her lover is unable to rescue her due to not being able to swim. In Montross's version, the song ends with "Though in life I used to hug her, now she's dead – I'll draw the line."

== History and origins ==
The lyrics by Percy Montrose were issued as sheet music by Oliver Ditson & Co of Boston in 1884, based on an earlier song called "Down by the River Liv'd a Maiden", printed in 1863. The origin of the melody is unknown. In his book South from Granada, Gerald Brenan claims that the melody was from an old Spanish ballad, made popular by Mexican miners during the California Gold Rush. It was best known from Romance del Conde Olinos o Niño, a sad love story very popular in Spanish-speaking cultures. It was also given various English translations.

It is unclear when, where, and by whom the song was first recorded in English, but the first version to reach the Billboard charts was that by Bing Crosby recorded on June 14, 1941, which briefly reached the No. 20 spot. It was given an updated and up-tempo treatment in an arrangement by Hal Hopper and John Scott Trotter. The re-written lyrics include a reference to Gene Autry ("could he sue me, Clementine?") amongst the five swinging verses.

== Notable versions ==
There have been numerous versions of the song recorded over the years.

=== Bobby Darin version ===
Bobby Darin recorded a version of the song in 1960, with lyrics credited to Woody Harris, in which Clementine is reimagined as a 299-pound woman. After she falls into the water, Darin suggests that Clementine could be mistaken for a whale and calls out to those on the high seas to watch for her, in a rhythm and style reminiscent of Darin's rendition of "Mack the Knife": "Hey you sailor, way out in your whaler, with your harpoon and your trusty line, if she shows now, yell... there she blows now. It just may be chunky Clementine." The song reached #12 in Canada.

=== Jan and Dean version ===
Jan and Dean had a hit with "Clementine", charting as high as 65 on the Billboard Hot 100. It was released on the Dore label (SP DORE 539 (US)) in November, 1959; "You're on My Mind" was the B Side.

=== Tom Lehrer version ===
Clementine by Tom Lehrer

Tom Lehrer recorded a set of variations on the song in 1959 on his live album An Evening Wasted with Tom Lehrer, demonstrating his theory that "folk songs are so atrocious because they were written by the people." He performs the first verse in the style of Cole Porter, the second in the style of "Mozart or one of that crowd", the third in a disjointed bebop sound parodying the style of Beat Generation musicians like Slim Gaillard or Babs Gonzales, and the final verse in the style of Gilbert and Sullivan.

=== Other versions ===
- In 1961, when ethnomusicologist Colin Turnbull asked a group of Ituri pygmies to sing the oldest song that they knew, they sang to the tune of "Clementine."
- In 1995, Elliott Smith released the song "Clementine," which was about a man who gets drunk and worries about his relationship while a bartender is singing the title song.

== In popular culture ==
=== Film ===
- The song plays during the opening credits for John Ford's 1946 movie My Darling Clementine, starring Henry Fonda and Victor Mature with Cathy Downs as the title character. It also runs as a background score all through the movie.
- The melody of this song was used as the theme song of the 1972 North Korean film The Flower Girl and it was claimed that the composer was Kim Il-sung.
- The song appears in the 1963 film Hud, during a scene in which a group of townspeople sing it together before a screening at the local cinema.
- The song is sung by Gene Autry in the 1949 western The Big Sombrero.
- Throughout all the 2022 biographical film ''Fragments of the Last Will'', based on the life of Japanese prisoner of war Hatao Yamamoto, who was interned in a Siberian prisoner camp at the end of WWII, the main chorus of the song is heard, sometimes hummed, most of the time sung by the protagonist (Kazunari Ninomiya), the actress that plays Yamamoto's wife (Keiko Kitagawa), or the actors that represent Yamamoto's campmates, some of whom delivered Yamamoto's last message to his family.
- In the 2025 film The Long Walk, the participants, in the latter part of the competition, break out into singing the song as a way to cope with their circumstances.

=== Television ===
- In 1986, the song was turned into an episode of the TV series Tall Tales & Legends entitled "My Darlin' Clementine" with Shelley Duvall as Clementine and narration by Randy Newman.
- In 1992, Peter Brooke, Secretary of State for Northern Ireland, sang "Darlin' Clementine" on The Late Late Show on Irish television. Just hours earlier, eight people (seven of them civilians) had been killed in the Teebane bombing. Brooke was forced to resign shortly after.
- A mangled rendition of "Darling Clementine" is animated coonhound Huckleberry Hound's signature tune, sung in most episodes of the cartoon series The Huckleberry Hound Show. But it often ends up as "Oh my darling what's her name".
- Episode 21 of Season 5 of M*A*S*H, "Movie Tonight," is about an attempt by Father Mulcahy to screen Col. Potter's favorite movie, John Ford's My Darling Clementine. (Supra.) As usual at the #4077th, things don't go smoothly, but eventually the staff manage to see the end of the film and they all sing "My Darling Clementine" as the credits roll.
- Episode 1 and Episode 6 of Banana Fish, a Japanese anime adapted from its corresponding manga, show multiple mentions of the song, as it is sung by the character Max Lobo, a former U.S. Marine (veteran) and journalist. Thus showing a trauma memory residue and a coping habit from his old military past.
- The song appears in the television series Outlander (TV series), Season 5, Episode 7.
- In a 30-second vignette during Episode 13, titled Sea Song, of The Little Rascals animated TV series for Hanna-Barbera Productions that aired December 11, 1982 on ABC, Alfalfa sings "Oh, My Darla" (a parody of "Oh, My Darling, Clementine") while swimming.

=== Use of melody ===
- The melody is used in "Xīnnián Hǎo" (新年好), a New Year and Chinese New Year song.
- The melody is used in "Dip The Apple In The Honey", a Jewish New Year song.
- In the 1956 Hindi film C.I.D., the melody of this song was used in the song "Yeh Hai Bombay Meri Jaan".
- The chorus to Cher Lloyd's 2011 single "Swagger Jagger" was seen as heavily borrowed from the melody of "Oh My Darling Clementine"
- The melody is used in an Indonesian children's song "Makan Apa".
- The melody is used in a drinking song in Scandinavian student societies as "Full i dag og Full i morgen".
- The melody is used in the ΕΟΚΑ song «Ἦταν Πρώτη Ἀπριλίου» ("It Was the First of April") by Christodoulos Papachrysostomou (Χριστόδουλος Παπαχρυσοστόμου) which commemorates the beginning of the EOKA uprising against British colonial rule in Cyprus on 1 April 1955.
- The melody is used in “Onder hele hoge bomen”, a Dutch children’s lullaby song about gnomes living in a gnome forest.

=== Other ===
- In the 1945 novel Animal Farm by George Orwell, the pig Old Major explains his dream of an animal-controlled society, and ends by singing Beasts of England. The song's tune is described in the novel as sounding like a combination of "La Cucaracha" and "Oh My Darling, Clementine".
