= You're the Reason I'm Living (song) =

Single by Bobby Darin

from the album You're the Reason I'm Living
- B-side: "Now You're Gone"
- Released: December 31, 1962
- Recorded: 1962
- Studio: Capitol Studios, Hollywood, California
- Genre: Country pop
- Length: 2:29
- Label: Capitol
- Songwriter: Bobby Darin
- Producer: Nick Venet

Bobby Darin singles chronology
| "I Found a New Baby" (1962) | "You're the Reason I'm Living" (1962) | "18 Yellow Roses" (1963) |

"You're the Reason I'm Living" is a 1963 single written and performed by Bobby Darin, from his album of the same name. Musicians on the recording session included drummer Earl Palmer.

== Chart performance ==
The single was very successful spending 2 weeks at #3 on Billboard's Hot 100 singles chart beginning March 16, 1963. "You're the Reason I'm Living" peaked at #9 on the Hot R&B Singles chart. In Canada the song reached #11.

== Cover versions ==
- Elvis Presley recorded a live version of the song for 1975's "Live in Las Vegas."
