= Splish Splash (song) =

- Japanese release picture sleeve

Single by Bobby Darin

from the album Bobby Darin
- B-side: "Judy Don't Be Moody"
- Released: May 19, 1958
- Recorded: April 10, 1958; Atlantic Studios (New York, New York)
- Genre: Rock and roll; novelty
- Length: 2:12
- Label: Atco #6117
- Songwriters: Bobby Darin, Murray Kaufman
- Producers: Ahmet Ertegun and Herb Abramson

Bobby Darin singles chronology
| "Just in Case You Change Your Mind" (1958) | "Splish Splash" (1958) | "Early in the Morning" (1958) |

"Splish Splash" is a 1958 novelty rock song performed and co-written by Bobby Darin.

It was written with DJ Murray the K (Murray Kaufman), who bet that Darin could not write a song that began with the words, "Splish splash, I was takin' a bath", as suggested by Murray's mother, Jean Kaufman. The song was credited to Darin and "Jean Murray" (a combination of their names) to avoid any hint of payola.

It was Darin's first hit and the song helped to give him a major boost in his career, reaching No. 3 on the U.S. pop singles chart, No. 2 on the R&B Best Sellers chart, and No. 3 in Canada. "Splish Splash" was Darin's only entry on the C&W Best Sellers in Stores chart, where it peaked at No. 14. In a 1967 interview, Darin claimed that he was so happy about having his first hit that his skin condition cleared up.

== Production ==
"Splish Splash" was recorded in a session at New York's Atlantic Studios on the evening of April 10, 1958. The personnel on the original recording included Jesse Powell on tenor sax, Al Caiola, Billy Mure on guitar, Wendell Marshall on bass, and Panama Francis on drums.

The lyrics mention several characters from other songs of the period, including "Lollipop", "Peggy Sue", and "Good Golly Miss Molly".

However, in an interview, former classmate Jerrold Atlas claimed that "Miss Molly" referred to Molly Epstein, Darin's former English teacher at the Bronx High School of Science. "She taught him to use the language in staccato notes: short fast, words...She was very fond of Bobby. Bobby told me she sharpened his respect for language".

== Chart performance ==
| Chart (1958) | Peak position |
|---|---|
| Canada (CHUM Hit Parade) | 3 |
| UK Singles (Official Charts) | 18 |
| US Billboard Hot 100 | 3 |
| US Billboard Country & Western Best Sellers | 14 |
| US Billboard Rhythm & Blues Best Sellers | 2 |
| US Cash Box Top 100 | 2 |

== Other versions ==
British comedian Charlie Drake scored a top ten hit with a comedy version of the song in 1958, produced by future Beatles producer George Martin on the Parlophone label. The song was remade in 1979 by Barbra Streisand for her album Wet. It features new lyrics by Streisand and backing vocals from Toto lead singer Bobby Kimball and Chicago keyboardist Bill Champlin. A short extract from the song also appears in the video for the 1812 Overture featuring Charlie Drake playing both the conductor and all the musicians.

A Brazilian Portuguese version of the song was recorded in 1963 by Roberto Carlos.

On 1965, Quebecois group César et les Romains broadcast a French cover of the song on television, over the network Télé-Métropole.

In 1975, Loggins and Messina recorded the song for their cover album So Fine (Loggins and Messina album).

In 1976, Barry Williams, Maureen McCormick, Donny Osmond and Marie Osmond performed the song on The Brady Bunch Variety Hour.

In 1979, German singer Frank Zander performed the song on the album Zander's Zorn.

In 1987, Joanie Bartels covered the song on her album, Bathtime Magic; it also appears on the compilation album The Stars of Discovery Music and in the 1994 movie, The Rainy Day Adventure.

In 1990, the Kidsongs Kids and Andre Tayir performed this song in the Kidsongs video, Ride the Roller Coaster.

A reggae remix was done on the 1994 pop album, Nickelodeon's Peanut Butter Jam: 10 Nutty Novelty Hits.

A children's version of this song was performed by "Elmo and Friends" on the Sesame Street album Splish Splash: Bath Time Fun released in 1995.

In 2002, Cat Brantley from Buckhead sang a parody called "My Imagination" on Lollipoprock.

Kevin Spacey performs the song in the Bobby Darin biopic Beyond the Sea (2004).

In both the English and German versions of Animals United (2010), Billy the Meerkat sings this song while taking a shower, but it's cut off by Toto the Chimpanzee.

Ann-Margret covered the song on her 2023 album, Born to Be Wild.

== In popular culture ==
"Splish Splash" was featured in the trailer for the Patrick Dempsey film Loverboy (1989). It also appears in the soundtrack for the 1998 movie You've Got Mail.

The song appeared in several episodes Happy Days, including one where Richie Cunningham becomes a DJ, 'Richie the C' (a satirical play on Murray the K).

In the Family Ties episode "The Boys Next Door", Elyse performs the song with her childhood friend Roger at a class reunion.

It was featured in a DTV music video on The Disney Channel, set mostly to clips of Disney characters bathing, particularly from the 1948 cartoon Mickey and the Seal (illustrating the singer's bath in the first verse), as well as Mickey's Birthday Party (to illustrate the party Darin walks in on).

The song was also featured on an insert on Sesame Street, where the zookeepers at the Bronx Zoo are washing the elephants.

The song can also be heard in the films Because of Winn-Dixie and Air Bud. It was partially sung in 2012 film The Dictator, when the main character, General Aladeen (Sacha Baron Cohen) plays a practical joke on his new friend (Jason Mantzoukas) by singing the song with a severed head as a hand puppet, while his friend is taking a shower.
