= Queen of the Hop =

Single by Bobby Darin
- B-side: "Lost Love"
- Released: September 1958
- Genre: Rock and roll
- Length: 2:08
- Label: Atco
- Songwriter(s): Woody Harris
- Producer(s): Ahmet Ertegun and Herb Abramson

Bobby Darin singles chronology
"Early in the Morning" (1958)	"Queen of the Hop" (1958)	"Silly Willy" (1958)

"Queen of the Hop" is a song written by Woody Harris and performed by Bobby Darin. It reached #6 on the US R&B chart, #9 on the US pop chart, #7 in Canada, and #24 on the UK Singles Chart in 1958.

== Other versions ==
- Don Lang released a version of the song as a single in 1958, but it did not chart.
- Dion released a version of the song on his 1962 album, Lovers Who Wander.
- Dave Edmunds released a version of the song on the soundtrack to the 1985 film Porky's Revenge!
- Shakin' Stevens and the Sunsets released a version of the song on their 1987 album, 16 Rock 'N' Roll Greats.
- Mike Berry and The Crickets released a version of the song on their 2006 album, About Time Too.
