= Woody Harris =

American songwriter

Woody Harris (November 1, 1911 – February 19, 1985) was an American songwriter of the 1950s and 1960s. He is perhaps best known for songs written for and with Bobby Darin. On "Queen of the Hop", Darin used the name "Walden Tweed". Darin's real name was Walden Robert Cassotto. He also wrote songs for Elvis Presley, Della Reese and other popular singers. In addition to his collaboration with Darin, he collaborated with Eddie V. Deane, Jack Reardon, and others. Harris composed songs in the rock and roll, rockabilly, and blues genres.

== Personal life ==
Harris was born November 1, 1911, in New York City. He died February 19, 1985, in Hallandale, Florida.

== Songs ==
Below is a partial list of songs written by Harris:

Title	Year	Collaborator	Performer
"All Night Long"	1959	Moon Mullican	Bobby Darin
"Brand New House"	1958	Bobby Darin	Bobby Darin, Otis Spann
"Clementine"	1960		Bobby Darin
"Dix-a-Billy"	1958	Paul Evans, Jack Reardon	LaVern Baker
"Early in the Morning"	1958	Bobby Darin	Bobby Darin, Buddy Holly
"I Want You With Me"	1961		Bobby Darin, Elvis Presley
"Pity Miss Kitty"	1960		Bobby Darin
"Queen of the Hop"	1958	Bobby Darin	Bobby Darin, Dion and the Belmonts, Danny & the Juniors
"Real Love"	1958	Bobby Darin	Bobby Darin
"Rock-a-Billy"	1957	Eddie V. Deane	Guy Mitchell
"School's Out"	1958	Bobby Darin	Bobby Darin
"Some of My Best Friends Are the Blues"	1967	Al Byron	Della Reese, Lena Horne, Jimmy Witherspoon
"You Never Called"	1960		Bobby Darin
"Was There a Call for Me" (B side of "Mack the Knife")	1958		Bobby Darin

== See also ==
- Category:Songs written by Woody Harris
