= Bobby Darin =

American musician, singer and actor (1936–1973)

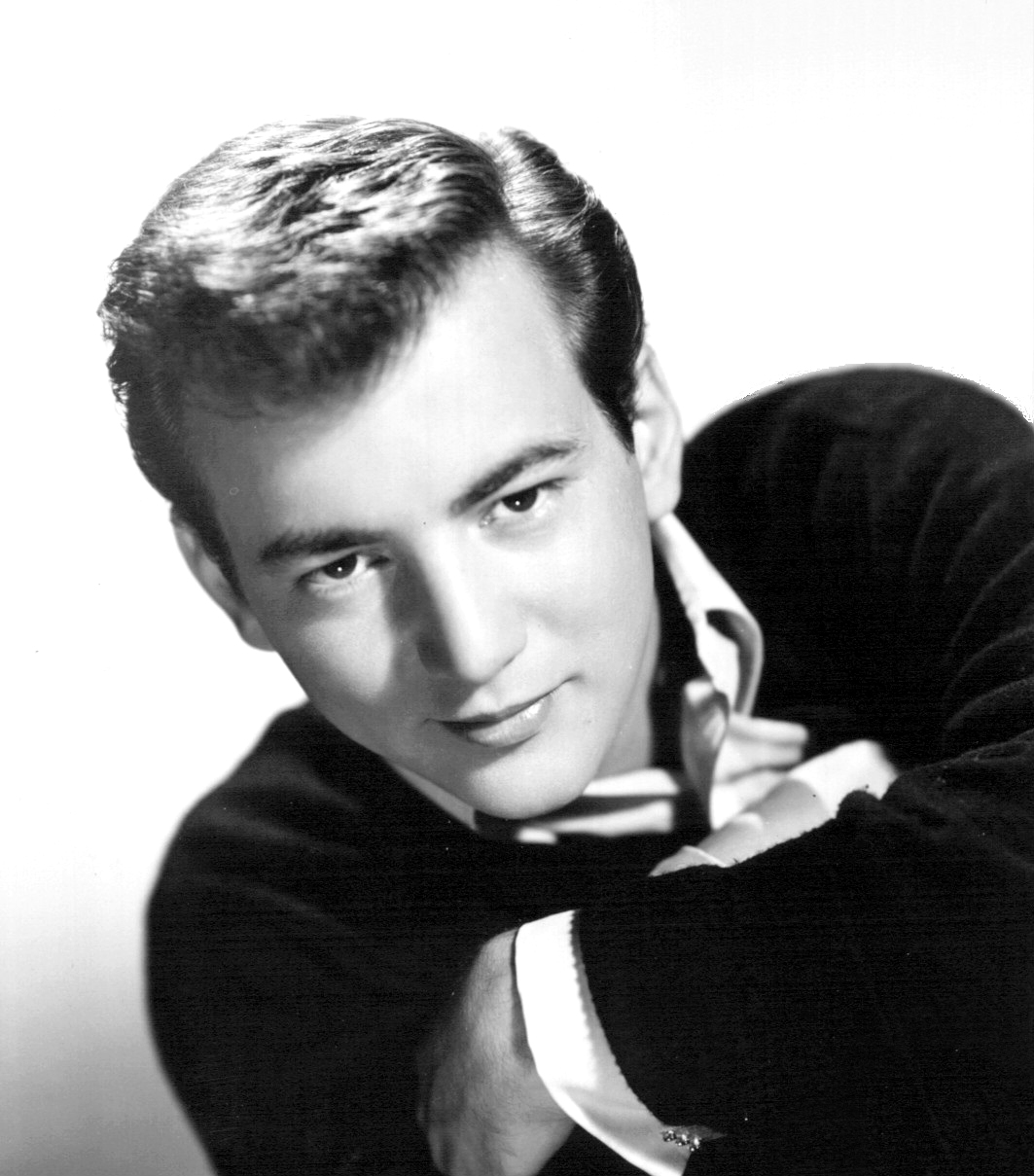
- A publicity photo of Darin in 1959
- Born: Walden Robert Cassotto; May 14, 1936; New York City, U.S.
- Died: December 20, 1973 (aged 37); Los Angeles, California, U.S.
- Occupations: Musician; singer; songwriter; actor
- Years active: 1956–1973
- Spouses: Sandra Dee (m. 1960; div. 1967); Andrea Yeager (m. 1973; div. 1973)
- Children: 1
- Musical career
- Genres: Pop; rock and roll; folk; swing
- Instruments: Vocals; guitar; piano; drums
- Works: Bobby Darin discography
- Labels: Decca Records; Atco Records; London Records; Capitol Records; Brunswick Records; Atlantic Records; Direction Records; Motown

Walden Robert Cassotto (May 14, 1936 – December 20, 1973), known by the stage name Bobby Darin, was an American singer, songwriter, and actor who performed pop, swing, folk, rock and roll and country music.

Darin started his career as a songwriter for Connie Francis. In 1958, Darin co-wrote and recorded his first million-selling single, "Splish Splash". "Splish Splash" was followed by "Dream Lover", "Mack the Knife", and "Beyond the Sea". In 1959, Darin was the inaugural winner of the Grammy Award for Best New Artist; he also won a Record of the Year for "Mack the Knife" at the 2nd Annual Grammy Awards. Three years later, Darin won a Golden Globe Award for his first film, Come September, which co-starred his first wife, actress Sandra Dee.

In the 1960s, Darin became more politically active and worked on Robert F. Kennedy's Democratic presidential campaign. Darin was present at the Ambassador Hotel in Los Angeles at the time of Robert Kennedy's assassination in June 1968. That same year, Darin was informed that the woman he believed to be his mother was actually his grandmother and that the woman he believed to be sister was actually his mother. These events deeply affected Darin and sent him into a long period of seclusion.

Although Darin made a successful comeback in television in the early 1970s, his health was beginning to fail due to a weak heart. He died in 1973 at age 37 in a hospital recovery room in Los Angeles after undergoing open heart surgery. Darin's life and career were dramatized in the 2004 biopic Beyond the Sea.

== Early life ==
Darin was born Walden Robert Cassotto in East Harlem in Manhattan on May 14, 1936, to Vanina Juliette "Nina" Cassotto (November 30, 1917 – November 3, 1983). Because his mother was only 18 at the time of his birth, Darin was raised to believe his maternal grandmother was his mother and Nina was his older sister.

Darin's maternal grandmother, Vivian "Polly" Fern Walden (born in 1891), was of English, Danish, and Norwegian ancestry and had been a vaudeville singer before Darin's birth. His maternal grandfather, Saverio Antonio "Big Sam Curly" Cassotto (born January 26, 1882), was of Italian descent. He had been a made man and "soldier" in the Genovese Crime Family, as well as a close associate of Frank Costello's. Sam Cassotto died from pneumonia in late 1935 while in prison, less than a year before Darin was born.

In 1968, when Darin was 32 and considering entering politics, Nina Cassotto told him that she was his mother. This information devastated Darin. Cassotto refused to reveal the identity of his biological father and took that secret to her grave when she died in 1983. Darin's father's identity remained unknown until 2020. In April 2020, Emilio "Milton" LePore (November 11, 1911 – January 5, 1965) was traced, through genealogical DNA, as being Darin's biological father.

Emilio LePore was the son of Italian immigrants and the oldest of five children. He went by the name Milton rather than his formal name, Emilio. He was the brother of actor Richard LePore (1927–1998) and the first cousin of actor Anthony Franciosa (1928–2006). Details about Milton LePore and Nina Cassotto's relationship are scarce. In August 1935, Cassotto became pregnant with Darin. Soon thereafter, Cassotto ended the relationship. By the end of the 1930s, LePore was institutionalized for schizophrenia. The 1940 Census listed LePore as an inmate of Rockland State Hospital, where he remained until his death in 1965.

Darin moved to the Bronx early in his life (with a rented summer home in Staten Island) and graduated from the prestigious Bronx High School of Science. In later years, Darin attributed his arrogance to his experiences there, where Darin was surrounded by brighter students who teased him. Darin then enrolled at Hunter College and soon gravitated to the drama department. After only two semesters, he dropped out to pursue an acting career. Darin was an ambitious young adult and aspired to be an actor, go on Broadway, and become a recording artist.

By the time he was a teenager, Darin could play several instruments including piano, drums, and guitar. He later added harmonica and xylophone. Darin took his stage name, Bobby Darin, when he began recording. One version of how Darin got the name is that the first three letters on a Mandarin Chinese restaurant were burned out. According to another version, he adapted it from the first name of actor Darren McGavin, TV's Mike Hammer. Darin said: "My legal name will remain Cassotto. Cassotto was my mother's name, and it will be my children's name."

== Music career ==
=== 1950s ===
Darin's career took off with a songwriting partnership, formed in 1955 with Don Kirshner, whom he met at a candy store in Washington Heights. They wrote jingles and songs, beginning with "Bubblegum Pop". In 1956, Darin's agent negotiated a contract with Decca Records. The songs recorded at Decca had minimal commercial success.

A member of the Brill Building gang of struggling songwriters, Darin was introduced to singer Connie Francis, with whom he helped write several songs. They developed a romantic interest, but her father was not fond of Darin and did not approve of the relationship, and the couple split up. At one point, Darin wanted to elope immediately; Francis has said that not marrying Darin was the biggest mistake of her life.

Darin left Decca to sign with Atlantic Records' Atco subsidiary, where he wrote and arranged music for himself and others. Guided by Atlantic's star-maker Ahmet Ertegun, Darin's career finally took off in 1958 when he recorded "Splish Splash". Darin co-wrote the song with radio DJ Murray Kaufman after a phone call from Kaufman's mother, Jean, a frustrated songwriter. Her latest song idea was: "Splish, Splash, Take a Bath". Both Kaufman and Darin felt the title was lackluster, but Darin, with few options, said: "I could write a song with that title." Within an hour, Darin had written "Splish Splash". The single, Darin's first successful foray into the rock-and-roll genre, sold over a million copies. His partnership with Kirshner, who was not involved in the writing of that song, ended at that time. Darin made another recording in 1958 for Brunswick Records with a band called the Ding Dongs. With the success of "Splish Splash", the single was re-released by Atco Records as "Early in the Morning" with the band renamed as the Rinky Dinks. It charted, and made it to number 24 in the United States.

In 1959, Darin recorded the self-penned "Dream Lover", a ballad that became a multimillion seller. With it came financial success and the ability to demand more creative control of his career; Darin meant for his That's All album to show that he could sing more than rock and roll as a result. Darin's next single, "Mack the Knife", the standard from Kurt Weill's Threepenny Opera, was given a vamping jazz-pop interpretation. Although Darin was initially opposed to releasing it as a single, the song went to number one on the chart for nine weeks, sold two million copies, and won the Grammy Award for Record of the Year in 1960. Darin won the Grammy Award for Best New Artist that year, and "Mack the Knife" has since been honored with a Grammy Hall of Fame Award.

Darin followed "Mack" with "Beyond the Sea", a jazzy English-language version of Charles Trenet's French hit song "La Mer". Both tracks were produced by Atlantic founders Ahmet and Nesuhi Ertegun with staff producer Jerry Wexler, and they featured arrangements by Richard Wess. The late-1950s success included Darin setting the all-time attendance record at the Copacabana nightclub in Manhattan and headlining at the major casinos in Las Vegas.

=== 1960s ===
Darin's 1960 recording of "Artificial Flowers", a song by Sheldon Harnick and Jerry Bock from the Broadway musical Tenderloin about the death of a child laborer, featured a jazzy, big band arrangement by Richard Behrke, that was in sharp contrast to its tragic lyrics.

In 1962, Darin began writing and singing country music, with hit songs including "Things" (US number three/UK number two) (1962), "You're the Reason I'm Living" (US number three), and "18 Yellow Roses" (US number 10). The latter two were recorded by Capitol Records, which he joined in 1962, before returning to Atlantic three years later. Darin left Capitol in 1964. Two years later, he had his final UK hit single, with a version of Tim Hardin's "If I Were A Carpenter", which peaked at number 9 (number eight in the US). Darin performed the opening and closing songs on the soundtrack of the 1965 Walt Disney film That Darn Cat!. "Things" was sung by Dean Martin in the 1967 TV special Movin' With Nancy, starring Nancy Sinatra.

In 1963, through his office in New York's Brill Building, Darin employed future The Byrds leader Roger McGuinn (then Jim McGuinn) and singer-songwriter Frank Gari as songwriters. McGuinn was "instructed to listen to the radio and to emulate the songs he heard". McGuinn and Gari brought Darin a song called "Beach Ball" and Darin booked recording time in the Brill Building demo studio where the three recorded the song with Darin on drums, Gari on piano and McGuinn on guitar and all three on vocals. The song was subsequently recorded by Australian variety show presenter Jimmy Hannan, with backing by the Bee Gees. Darin, McGuinn and Gari's recording was issued in 1963 by Capitol Records under the name The City Surfers. A second City Surfers single was issued the same year, again with writers under Darin's employ (Frank Gari, Artie Resnick and Kenny Young) providing the songs. Darin's T. M. Music/T. M. Productions produced both singles, but details of the second City Surfers single session are lost, though Darin does appear to feature prominently as vocalist on the second City Surfers single.

During his career, Darin performed pop music, swing music, folk music, rock and roll, and country music.

== Acting career ==
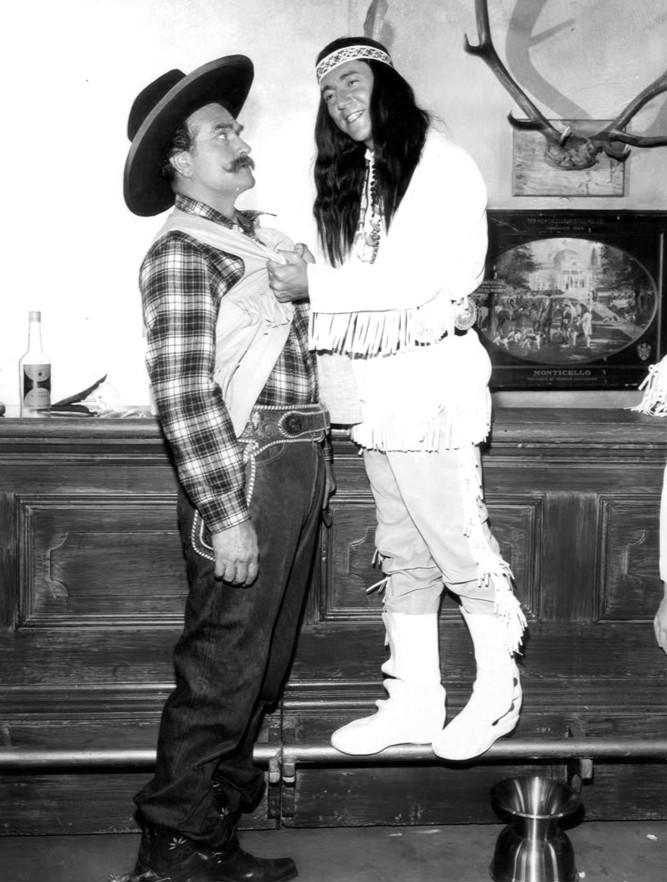
"Deadeye" and Darin in a 1965 Red Skelton Show skit

In the fall of 1959, Darin played Honeyboy Jones in an early episode of Jackie Cooper's CBS military sitcom/drama Hennesey. Darin's first major film, Come September (1961), was a teenager-oriented romantic comedy with Rock Hudson and Gina Lollobrigida, and featuring 18-year-old actress Sandra Dee. They met during the production of the film, and they soon married on December 1, 1960. Dee gave birth to a son, Dodd Mitchell Darin (also known as Morgan Mitchell) on December 16, 1961. Dee and Darin made a few films together with moderate success, such as If a Man Answers (1962) and That Funny Feeling (1965).

In 1961, Darin starred as a struggling jazz musician in Too Late Blues, John Cassavetes' first film for a major Hollywood studio. Writing in 2012, Los Angeles Times critic Dennis Lim observed that Darin was "a surprise in his first nonsinging role, willing to appear both arrogant and weak". In 1962, Darin won the Golden Globe Award for "New Star of the Year – Actor" for his role in Come September. The following year he was nominated for a Best Actor Golden Globe for Pressure Point.

In 1963, Darin was nominated for an Academy Award for Best Supporting Actor for his role as a shell-shocked soldier in Captain Newman, M.D. Throughout his acting career, Darin appeared alongside a series of Hollywood leading men: Sidney Poitier, Steve McQueen, and Gregory Peck. In October 1964, Darin appeared as a wounded ex-convict who is befriended by an orphan girl in "The John Gillman Story" episode of NBC's Wagon Train Western television series.

== Later years ==
=== Politics ===
"Now my attitude is very simple: I must do what artistically pleases me."

— Bobby Darin, 1967 Pop Chronicles interview

Darin became more politically active as the 1960s progressed, and his musical output became more "folksy". In 1966, Darin had a hit with folksinger Tim Hardin's "If I Were a Carpenter", securing a return to the Top 10 after a two-year absence.

Darin traveled with Robert F. Kennedy and worked on the politician's 1968 presidential campaign. He was with Kennedy on June 4, 1968, the day he traveled to Los Angeles for the California primary, and Darin was also at the Ambassador Hotel later that night when Kennedy was assassinated. That event, combined with learning about his true parentage, had a deep effect on Darin, who spent most of the next year living in seclusion in a trailer near Big Sur. In 1968–1969, during his sabbatical, Darin wrote and recorded two albums that covered issues such as civil rights, poverty, the Vietnam War, and the death of RFK – Bobby Darin Born Walden Robert Cassotto (1968) and Commitment (1969).

=== Direction Records ===
Returning to Los Angeles in 1969, Darin started his own record label, Direction Records, putting out folk and protest music. Darin wrote "Simple Song of Freedom" in 1969, which in an interesting turn of events, was first recorded by Tim Hardin, and the song became Hardin's best-selling record. It reached number 48 on the RPM Top 100 Singles list in Canada. Also in Canada, a version by Buckwheat reached number 52. Darin himself sang the song "live" on several television variety shows. Speaking about his first Direction album Darin said, "The purpose of Direction Records is to seek out statement-makers. ... The album is solely comprised of compositions designed to reflect my thoughts on the turbulent aspects of modern society."

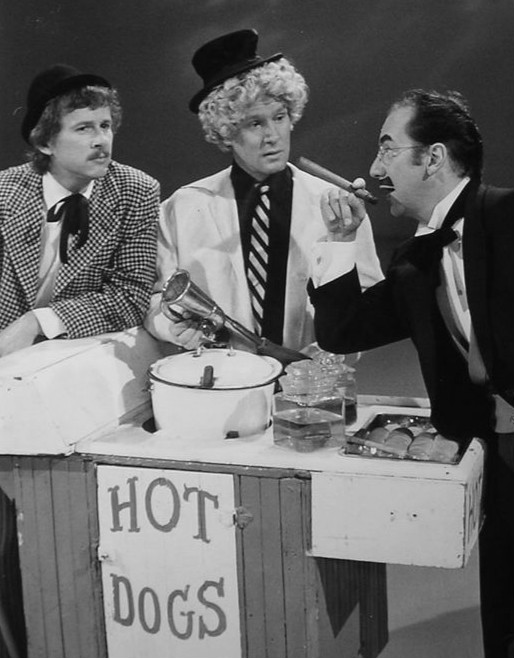
Dean Martin Presents: The Bobby Darin Amusement Company, L–R: Dick Smothers, Tom Smothers, and Bobby Darin as the Marx Brothers (1972)

Darin was struggling with his finances as his music career dwindled. Darin's venture into protest music was not received favorably and generated little or no profits. In late 1969, he sold his songs, his record label (Direction Records), and publishing company (TM Music), losing the copyright to his own music and eventually, their worth. The company to which Darin sold them went bankrupt. During his final days, Darin was believed to have been still trying to gain back the rights to his music.

=== 1970s ===
In 1970, Darin proposed a self-directed and written film The Vendors (1970), about the life of a folk singer. However, the production left him broke and was not released, which led Darin to return to music. In spite of his declining health, Darin's last venture was spent performing live, while undergoing heart surgery and receiving post-treatment medication. He released his last album, self-titled (1972) on Motown.

=== NBC variety shows ===
Beginning on July 27, 1972, Darin starred in his own television variety show on NBC, Dean Martin Presents: The Bobby Darin Amusement Company, which ran for seven episodes ending on September 7. Beginning on January 19, 1973, Darin starred in a similar show on NBC called The Bobby Darin Show. That show ran for 13 episodes, ending on April 27. Darin subsequently made television guest appearances and remained a top draw.

== Style and influence ==
In 1960, Darin told Life that he wanted to be established as a legend by the age of 25. Darin's off-the-cuff statements generated a rivalry and playful banter between Sinatra and himself. Sinatra released a version of "Mack the Knife" on the 1984 album L.A. Is My Lady, perhaps a testament to Darin. Darin and Elvis Presley were friends and teen idols in the 1950s. On occasion, Presley would sneak into Darin's concerts and watch him perform.

In his short life, Darin explored all genres of music, such as pop, jazz, country, and folk music. In a 1988 Rolling Stone interview, Neil Young said: "I used to be pissed off at Bobby Darin because he changed styles so much. Now I look at him and I think he was a fucking genius."

== Personal life ==
=== Relationship with Connie Francis ===
In 1956, Darin and Connie Francis met after their manager, George Scheck, arranged for Francis to record a song Darin had written. They were soon in what Darin's friends described as "an intense romance". However, Francis's parents did not approve of Darin, and one night, after returning from a date, Francis found her bags packed and waiting for her on the front step. Darin proposed almost immediately. When her father found out about the engagement, he stormed into the rehearsals of The Jackie Gleason Show with a gun and threatened to shoot Darin, who managed to escape out a window. Darin and Francis talked briefly after the show, but parted ways. Over a four-month period in 1956, the two maintained a secret correspondence involving love letters. Darin kept the letters until his death, and the letters were auctioned. They were returned to Francis later.

In the following years, they saw each other several times while appearing on the same television shows, but were never romantically involved again. In 1960, Francis heard on the radio that Darin had married Sandra Dee – just as her father and she were driving through the Lincoln Tunnel. Francis later wrote: "I wished that somehow God would cause the Hudson River to come gushing in and entrap us in that tunnel." Francis said that not marrying Darin was the biggest mistake of her life.

=== Marriages ===
Darin married actress Sandra Dee on December 1, 1960. They met in Rome, Italy, while filming Come September (which was released in 1961). It was Dee's mother, Mary Douvon, who convinced the actress to go on a date with Darin. Later commenting on their relationship, Dee stated: "Bobby loved me. He was a calculating guy, but I don't think he arrived in Rome with a plan to marry this new little Mary Pickford of Hollywood. Aside from the fact that he was rude, brash, and always trying to get a reaction, I didn't like this person. I just thought, this is a conniving SOB." On December 16, 1961, they had a son named Dodd Mitchell Darin. In the early 1960s, the pair became Hollywood's golden couple, but they had a troubled marriage, and divorced on March 7, 1967.

Darin's second wife was Andrea Yeager, a legal secretary, whom he met in 1970. They married on June 25, 1973, after living together for three years. Four months later, in October 1973, the couple divorced amid strain caused by Darin's worsening health problems when it became apparent that he was dying.

=== Health ===
Darin suffered from poor health throughout his life. He was frail as an infant. Beginning at age eight, he had recurring bouts of rheumatic fever that left him with a seriously weakened heart. Darin was well aware that he might not live long, and he lived his life accordingly. In the last few years of his life, Darin was often administered oxygen during and after his performances on stage and screen.

In January 1971, Darin received two artificial heart valves.

== Death ==
In 1973, after failing to take antibiotics to protect his heart before a dental visit, Darin developed an overwhelming systemic infection which further weakened his body and affected one of his heart valves. On December 11, 1973, he checked himself into Cedars of Lebanon Medical Hospital in Los Angeles for another round of open-heart surgery to repair the two artificial heart valves he had received in 1971. On the evening of December 19, a four-person surgical team worked for over six hours to repair Darin's damaged heart. The morning after the surgery, Darin died at the age of 37 in the hospital's recovery room.

Darin's last wish in his will was that his body be donated to science for medical research, and his remains were transferred to the UCLA Medical Center shortly after his death.

== Legacy ==
In 1990, Darin was inducted into the Rock and Roll Hall of Fame, with singer and close friend Paul Anka announcing the honor. In 1999, Darin was voted into the Songwriters Hall of Fame. Songwriter Alan O'Day alluded to Darin and his recording of "Mack the Knife" in the song "Rock and Roll Heaven" (made a hit by the Righteous Brothers), a tribute to deceased musicians, which O'Day wrote shortly after Darin's death.

On May 14, 2007, on what would have been his 71st birthday, Darin was awarded a star on the Las Vegas Walk of Stars to honor his contribution to making Las Vegas the "Entertainment Capital of the World" and named Darin one of the 20th century's greatest entertainers. Fans paid for the star. Darin also has a star on the Hollywood Walk of Fame. On December 13, 2009, at its 2010 Grammy Awards ceremony, the Recording Academy awarded Darin a posthumous Lifetime Achievement Award.

=== Biopic ===
In 1986, director Barry Levinson intended to direct a film based on Darin's life and had begun preproduction on the project by early 1997. He abandoned the project, the rights to which were subsequently bought by actor Kevin Spacey, along with Darin's son, Dodd. The resultant biopic, Beyond the Sea, starred Spacey as Darin, with the actor using his own singing voice for the musical numbers. The film covers much of Darin's life and career, including his marriage to Sandra Dee, portrayed by Kate Bosworth.

Beyond the Sea opened at the 2004 Toronto International Film Festival. Although Dodd Darin, Sandra Dee, and Blauner responded enthusiastically to Spacey's work and the film was strongly promoted by the studio, Beyond the Sea received mixed to poor reviews upon wide release, and box-office results were disappointing. Spacey, however, was nominated for the Golden Globe Award for Best Actor—Motion Picture Musical or Comedy, but the award that year went to Jamie Foxx for his portrayal of Darin's musical contemporary Ray Charles.

=== Musical ===
In September 2016, Dream Lover: The Bobby Darin Musical had its world premiere at Sydney Lyric Theatre, Australia. The production featured the story of Darin with an 18-piece big band. Darin was played by David Campbell. Darin had an unusual upbringing, growing up with a "mother" who was actually his grandmother and alongside a "sister" who was actually his mother, a fact Darin did not discover until he was 31. Campbell grew up in a similar circumstance, leading Bobby's son Dodd Darin to describe Campbell as perfect for the role: "You have to have lived something like that to understand it and [Campbell] has, and I think he can relate to my dad, he can relate to the pain." Campbell made similar observations, describing playing Darin as a "cathartic experience", and stating, "I feel like I'm healing things during this show." The production was nominated in six categories in the 18th Helpmann Awards including for Best Musical, with Campbell receiving the Helpmann Award for Best Male Actor in a Musical.

In 2025, Jonathan Groff was nominated for the Tony Award for Best Lead Actor in a Musical for his portrayal of Darin in the original Broadway production of Just in Time. In 2026, Matthew Morrison, Jeremy Jordan, and Nicholas Christopher would all have stints in the role of Darin.

== Discography ==
Studio albums

- Bobby Darin (1958)
- That's All (1959)
- This Is Darin (1960)
- For Teenagers Only (1960)
- The 25th Day of December (1960)
- Two of a Kind (1961)
- Love Swings (1961)
- Twist with Bobby Darin (1961)
- Bobby Darin Sings Ray Charles (1962)
- Things and Other Things (1962)
- Oh! Look at Me Now (1962)
- You're the Reason I'm Living (1963)
- It's You or No One (1963)
- 18 Yellow Roses (1963)
- Earthy! (1963)
- Golden Folk Hits (1963)
- Winners (1964)
- From Hello Dolly to Goodbye Charlie (1964)
- Venice Blue (1965)
- Bobby Darin Sings The Shadow of Your Smile (1966)
- In a Broadway Bag (Mame) (1966)
- If I Were a Carpenter (1966)
- Inside Out (1967)
- Bobby Darin Sings Doctor Dolittle (1967)
- Bobby Darin Born Walden Robert Cassotto (1968)
- Commitment (1969)
- Bobby Darin (1972)

== Filmography ==
Films starred

- Pepe (1960)
- Come September (1961)
- Too Late Blues (1961)
- State Fair (1962)
- Hell Is for Heroes (1962)
- If a Man Answers (1962)
- Pressure Point (1962)
- Captain Newman, M.D. (1963)
- That Funny Feeling (1965)
- Gunfight in Abilene (1967)
- Stranger in the House (1967)
- The Happy Ending (1969)
- Happy Mother's Day, Love George (1973)

Television

- Wagon Train, "The John Gillman Story" (1964)

== Awards ==
Darin was inaugural winner of the Grammy Awards category Best New Artist in 1959.

Year	Category	Nominated work	Result
1959	Best New Artist	Himself	Won
1959	Record of the Year	"Mack the Knife"	Won
1959	Best Male Pop Vocal Performance	"Mack the Knife"	Nominated
1963	Best Rhythm & Blues Recording	"What'd I Say"	Nominated
1969	Best Contemporary (R&R) Performance	"If I Were A Carpenter"	Nominated
2010	Grammy Lifetime Achievement Award	Himself	Won

== Books ==
- Dodd Darin and Maxine Paetro (1994): Dream Lovers: the Magnificent Shattered Lives of Bobby Darin and Sandra Dee. New York: Warner Books. ISBN 0-446-51768-2.
- David Evanier (2010): Roman Candle: The Life of Bobby Darin. Albany, NY: SUNY Press. ISBN 978-1-4384-3458-2.
