= Mame =

Mame may refer to:

== Arts and entertainment ==
- Mame (musical), a 1966 Broadway musical by Jerry Herman, and the title character, Mame
  - Mame (original Broadway cast recording), a 1966 album containing a recording of the musical
  - "Mame" (song), a popular song from the musical
  - Mame (film), a 1974 American film based on the musical
    - Mame (film soundtrack), an album containing the soundtrack to the film
- MAME, an emulator for various electronic devices, most notably arcade games
- Mame Soramame, a fictional character from the anime and manga series Dr. Slump
- Mame, a French publisher owned by Média-Participations

== People ==
- Mame (given name)
- Mame people or Mam, an indigenous people of Mexico
- Alfred-Henri-Amand Mame (1811–1893), French printer and publisher

== Other uses ==
- Mame, a size classification of bonsai

== See also ==
- Auntie Mame, a novel by Patrick Dennis; basis for the musical
- Auntie Mame (film), a 1958 film based on the novel
- Mayme, a given name
- Maim
