= All American in Jazz =

1962 album by Duke Ellington

Studio album by Duke Ellington
- Released: 1962
- Recorded: January 2, 5, 10 and 23, 1962
- Studio: Columbia 30th Street, New York City
- Genre: Jazz
- Length: 29:37
- Label: Columbia
- Producer: Teo Macero

Duke Ellington chronology
The Girl's Suite and The Perfume Suite (1961)	All American in Jazz (1962)	Midnight in Paris (1965)

All American in Jazz is an album by American pianist, composer and bandleader Duke Ellington recorded in 1962 and released on the Columbia label. The album features recordings of tunes from the 1962 Broadway theatre musical All American arranged by Ellington and Billy Strayhorn.

== Track listing ==
All compositions by Charles Strouse and Lee Adams.

1. "Back to School" – 2:48
2. "I've Just Seen Her" – 4:32
3. "Which Way?" – 2:20
4. "If I Were You" – 2:56
5. "Once Upon a Time" – 3:20
6. "Nightlife" – 2:18
7. "Our Children" – 3:10
8. "I Couldn't Have Done It Alone" – 2:22
9. "We Speak the Same Language" – 2:51
10. "What a Country!" – 3:00

== Personnel ==
- Duke Ellington (tracks 2–8 & 10), Billy Strayhorn (tracks 1, 3, 6 & 9) – piano
- Ray Nance – cornet
- Cat Anderson, Shorty Baker, Bill Berry, Ed Mullens – trumpet
- Lawrence Brown, Lyle Cox – trombone
- Chuck Connors – bass trombone
- Jimmy Hamilton – clarinet, tenor saxophone
- Johnny Hodges – alto saxophone
- Russell Procope – alto saxophone, clarinet
- Paul Gonsalves – tenor saxophone
- Harry Carney – baritone saxophone
- Aaron Bell – bass
- Sam Woodyard – drums
