= In a Broadway Bag (Mame) =

Studio album by Bobby Darin
- Released: June 1966
- Genre: Jazz/Pop
- Length: 39:02
- Label: Atlantic
- Producer: Bobby Darin

Bobby Darin chronology
Bobby Darin Sings The Shadow of Your Smile (1966)	In a Broadway Bag (Mame) (1966)	If I Were a Carpenter (1966)

Singles from In a Broadway Bag (Mame)
- 1. "Mame" Released: April 1966

In a Broadway Bag (Mame) is a studio album by American singer Bobby Darin, released in June 1966. The album was arranged and conducted by Shorty Rogers and Perry Botkin Jr., while Darin himself produced it.

The album consists of songs from then-current hit Broadway musicals, including Funny Girl, How to Succeed in Business Without Really Trying, Mame, The Roar of the Greasepaint, the Smell of the Crowd, and others.

The single from the album, "Mame", debuted on the Billboard Hot 100 in the issue dated April 30, 1966, and peaked at number 53 during a seven-week stay on the chart. The song peaked at number three on the magazine's Easy Listening chart, during its 14-weeks stay. It reached number 66 on the Cashbox singles chart and stayed on the chart for six weeks.

The album was released on compact disc by Diablo Records on October 13, 1998, as tracks 16 through 26 on a pairing of two albums on one CD, with tracks 1 through 11 consisting of Darin's 1966 album, Bobby Darin Sings The Shadow of Your Smile.

== Reception ==
Professional ratings
Review scores
Source	Rating
AllMusic	4/5 stars
The Encyclopedia of Popular Music	2/5 stars

In his AllMusic review, critic JT Griffith wrote "The Shadow of Your Smile began the second highly successful period in the artist's career, after the "Splish Splash" and "Mack the Knife" days. In a Broadway Bag continued that success, and "Mame" was his biggest hit in three years. In a Broadway Bag is generally considered one of Bobby Darin's best (and certainly most cohesive) LPs."

Billboard praises Darin's "outstanding...renditions of 'Feelin' Good', 'Don't Rain on My Parade', and 'Everybody Has the Right to be Wrong'."

Cashbox notes "The electric stylings of Bobby Darin are applied to a series of superb tunes from both on and off Broadway productions."

Variety notes that Darin "belts with a theatrical style that suits this material very neatly."

in That's All: Bobby Darin On Record, Stage & Screen, Revised and Expanded Second Edition, Jeff Bleiel describes the album as "the best album of standard material Darin ever recorded."

Disc and Music Echo describes the album as "A cool set of party swingers from the dynamic Mr Darin."

== Track listing ==
=== Side one ===
1. "Mame" (Jerry Herman, from Mame) – 2:13
2. "I Believe in You" (Frank Loesser, from How to Succeed in Business Without Really Trying) – 3:49
3. "It's Today" (Herman, from Mame) – 2:05
4. "Everybody Has the Right to Be Wrong" (Sammy Cahn, Jimmy Van Heusen, from Skyscraper) – 2:36
5. "Feeling Good" (Leslie Bricusse, Anthony Newley, from The Roar of the Greasepaint – The Smell of the Crowd) – 2:45
6. "Don't Rain on My Parade" (Bob Merrill, Jule Styne, from Funny Girl) – 2:54

=== Side two ===
1. "The Other Half of Me" (Stan Freeman, Jack Lawrence, from I Had a Ball) – 2:26
2. "Once Upon a Time" (Lee Adams, Charles Strouse, from All American) – 3:05
3. "Try to Remember" (Tom Jones, Harvey Schmidt, from The Fantasticks) – 3:08
4. "I'll Only Miss Her When I Think of Her" (Cahn, Van Heusen, from Skyscraper) – 2:32
5. "Night Song" (Adams, Strouse, from Golden Boy) – 2:56

== Charts ==
=== Singles ===
Year	Title	US Hot 100	US AC	US Cashbox
1966	"Mame"	53	3	66

== Personnel ==
- Bobby Darin – vocals
