= Mayme =

Mayme is a female given name.

People with the name include:

- Mayme Agnew Clayton (1923–2006), librarian and leader of the Western States Black Research and Education Center
- Mayme Cox, née Harding (fl. 1890s–1910s), first wife of politician James M. Cox
- Mayme Gehrue (c. 1880–c. 1929), American actress and dancer
- Mayme Gerhard (1876–1955), photographer
- Mayme Hatcher Johnson (died 2009), wife of gangster Bumpy Johnson
- Mayme Kelso (1867–1946), American actress of the silent era
- Mayme Kratz (born 1958) is a fine artist and desert forager
- Mayme Logsdon (1881–1967), American mathematician
- Mayme Ousley (1887–1970), mayor of St. James, Missouri
- Mayme Watts (fl. 1950s–1960s), American songwriter and R&B singer
- Mayme, an orphan girl who works in a store in the 1929 film, The Saturday Night Kid

== See also ==
- Mamie
- Mame (disambiguation)
