= Tempe Center for the Arts =

Public venue in Arizona, US

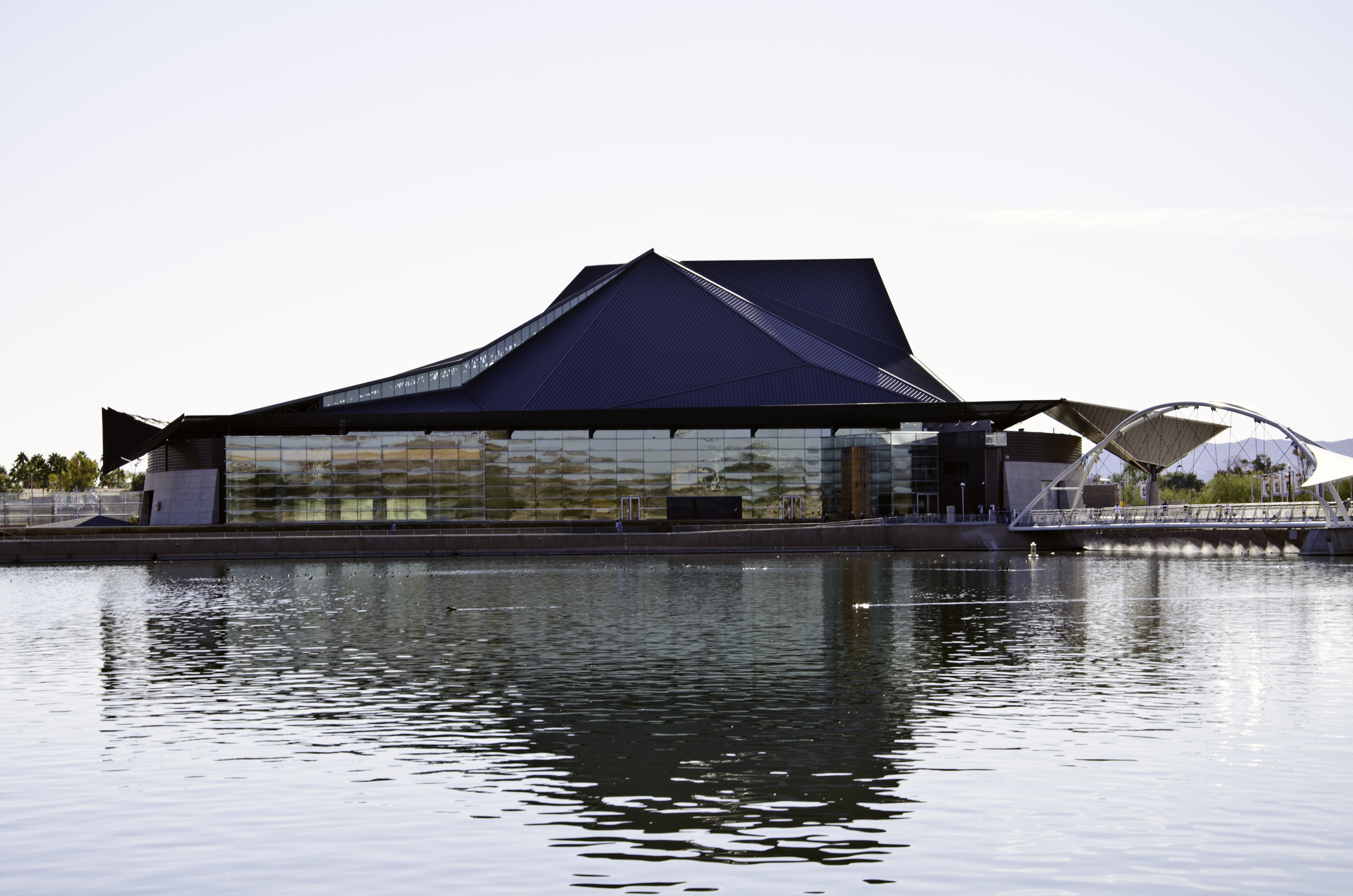
- Exterior view of venue from the Salt River (c.2011)
- Interactive map of Tempe Center for the Arts
- Address: 700 W Rio Rio Salado Pkwy; Tempe, AZ; United States
- Location: Metro Phoenix
- Coordinates: 33°25′54″N 111°56′56″W
- Owner: City of Tempe
- Capacity: 600 (Theater); 275 (Studio); 219 (Lakeside)

Construction
- Groundbreaking: 2004
- Opened: September 7, 2007
- Cost: $65 million ($111 million in 2025 dollars)
- Architects: Architekton; Barton Myers
- Project manager: Kitchell
- Structural engineer: Arup Group
- Services engineer: Stantec
- General contractor: Okland Construction

Website
- www.tempecenterforthearts.com

Tempe Center for the Arts (TCA) is a publicly owned performing and visual arts center in Tempe, Arizona. It opened in September 2007 and houses a 600-seat proscenium theater, a 200-seat studio theater, and a 3,500-square-foot gallery. Its Lakeside Room seats 200 people and overlooks Tempe Town Lake.

== History ==
In 1998, a citizens group along with city leaders in Tempe began to discuss and survey citizens about the idea of an arts center of the city. With positive reception to the proposition, city officials begin to plan the out the facility that would become the Tempe Center for the Arts.

Tempe residents officially approved the center two years later, passing Proposition 400, which dedicated a one-tenth percent sales tax to provide funding for development, construction and operation of the center. $63 million for the art center and $2.7 million for the adjacent art park in funding was secured in the bill. On April 11, 2002, the Tempe City Council officially approved the final plans for the arts center.

Ground broke on the project on April 22, 2003. While originally slated to open in spring 2006, the design and construction of the roof proved a larger under taking than planned. The Tempe Center for the Arts completed construction in August 2007, with a grand opening on September 9, 2007.

== Architecture ==
The building was designed by Barton Myers Associates of Los Angeles and Architekton of Tempe. For the entrance, environmental designer Ned Kahn used 8,000 embedded marbles and tiny mirrors to create a shimmering, sunlit effect at the center's marquee. It echoes the shimmering effect on the west wall of the Lakeside room, where an array of mirrors captures and digitizes the available light reflecting off the center's negative edge pool.

The Centre features a roof made of complex, geometrically folded plates. The roof is visible from the surrounding freeways and the man-made Tempe Town Lake, which occupies the natural watercourse of the Salt River, immediately adjacent to the site.

The city government chose a management company (Kitchell CEM) to oversee a three-phase design competition, which resulted in the selection of the design team in 2000.

Five public art pieces were included in the design:

- Entry Marquee – Ned Kahn
- Fireplace– trueNorth - Mayme Kratz and Mark Ryan
- Fountain Reflections – Ned Kahn
- Lobby Carpet – Ramona Saskiestewa
- Aurora - Brower Hatcher

The Center includes the Gallery at TCA, a visual arts gallery featuring free exhibits of two and three-dimensional artwork by both locally and internationally recognized artists.

== Current Resident Artists ==
- Arizona Theatre Company
- Arizona Wind Symphony
- Black Theatre Troupe (Guest Artists)
- Bridge Initiative: Women in Theatre
- Childsplay
- CONDER/dance
- Desert Dance Theatre
- Hayden's Ferry Chamber Music Series
- Lakeshore Music
- Scottsdale Musical Theatre Company
- Stray Cat Theatre
- Tandem Duo
- Tempe Comedy
- Tempe Symphony Orchestra
- Tempe Winds

== Past Resident Artists ==
Home to city-produced programs:

- Songwriters' Showcase
- In the Spotlight
- Tempe Poetry in April
- Art After Work
- Finally Friday

== Photo Gallery ==
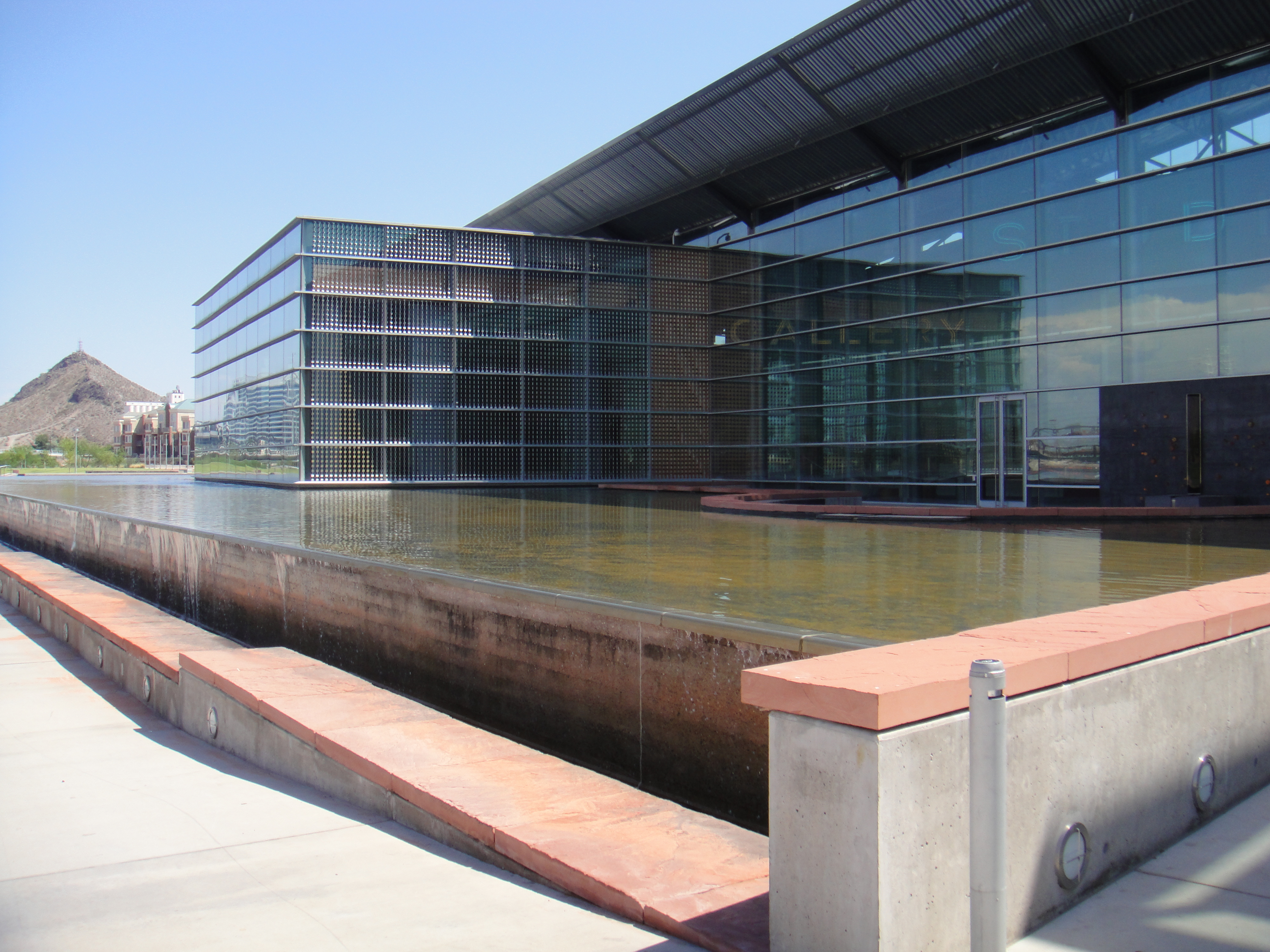
Photo on the outside of the Lakeside looking across the reflecting pond known as Mare Undarum – Sea of Waves.

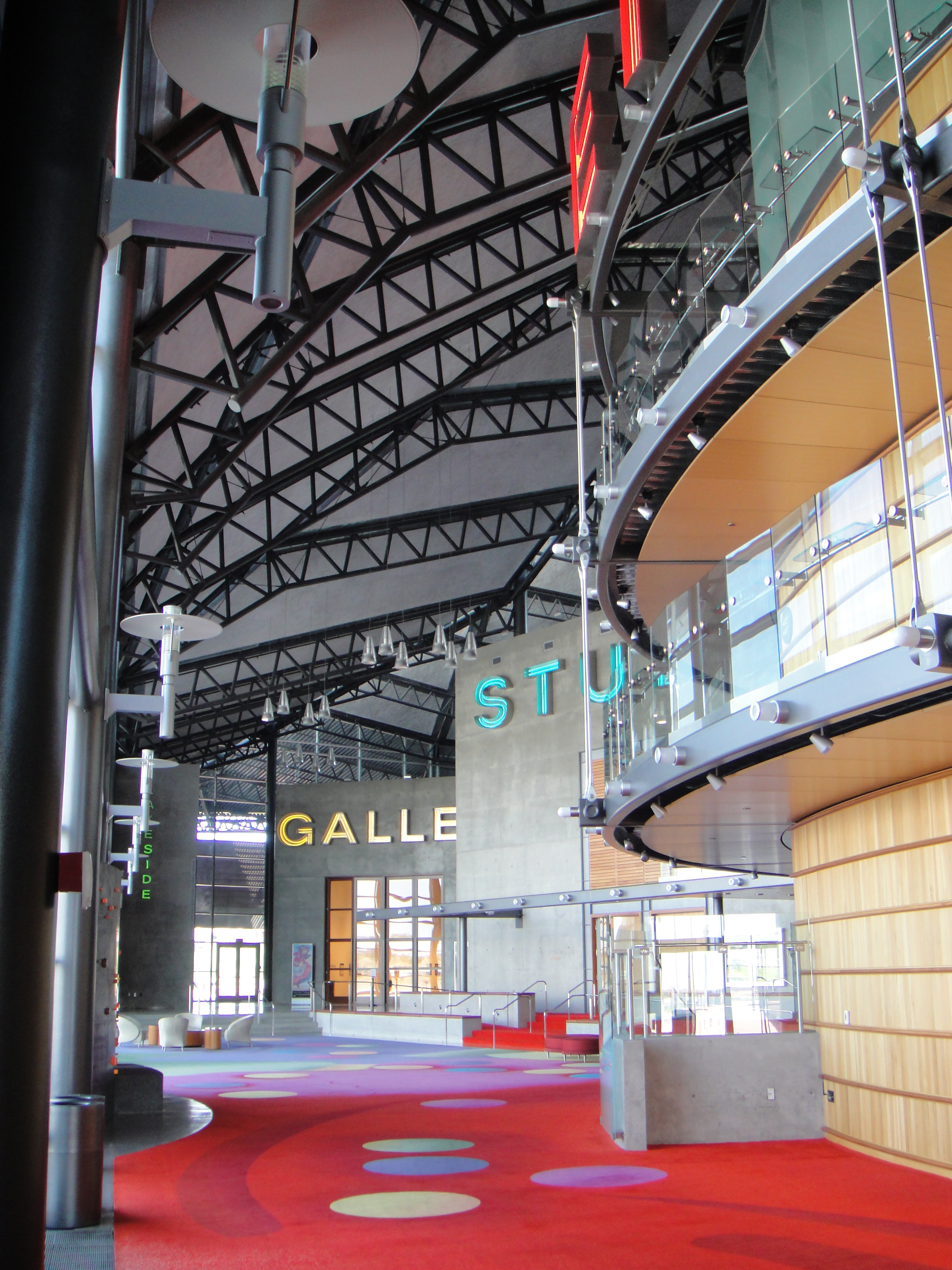
Photo of the lobby looking east.

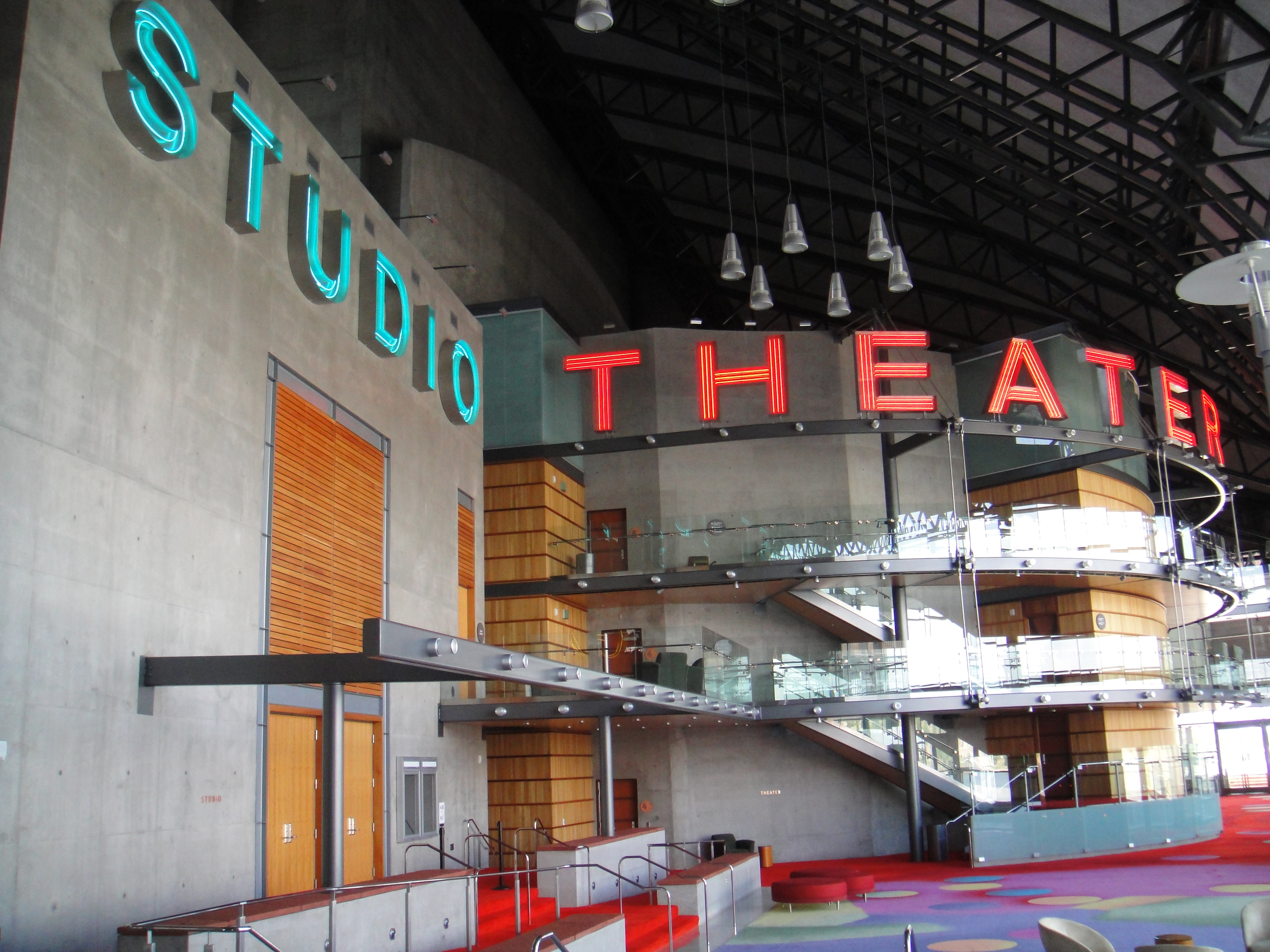
Photo of the lobby looking west.

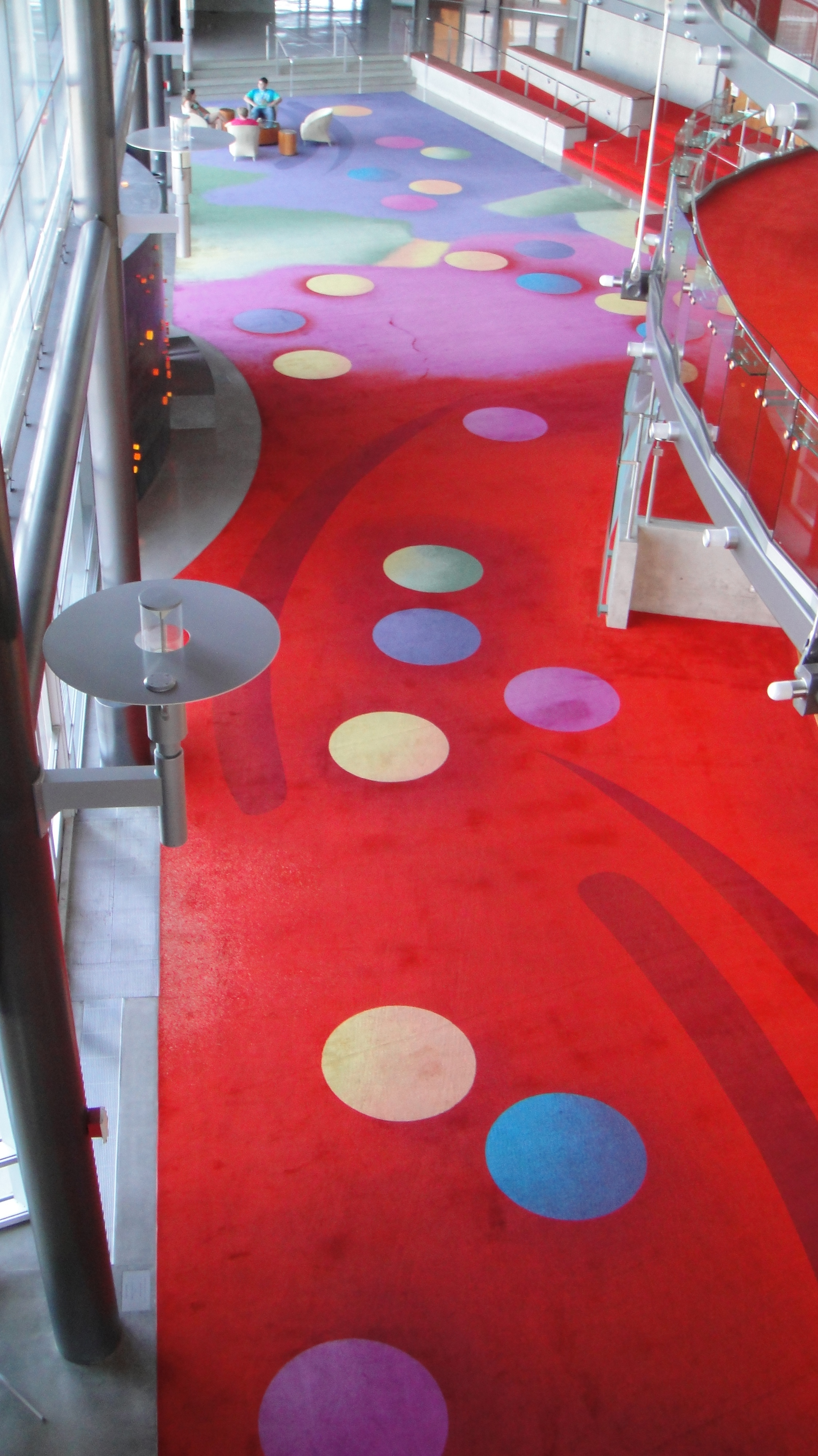
Photo of the lobby carpet design called Agua Corriente, looking down from the third floor.

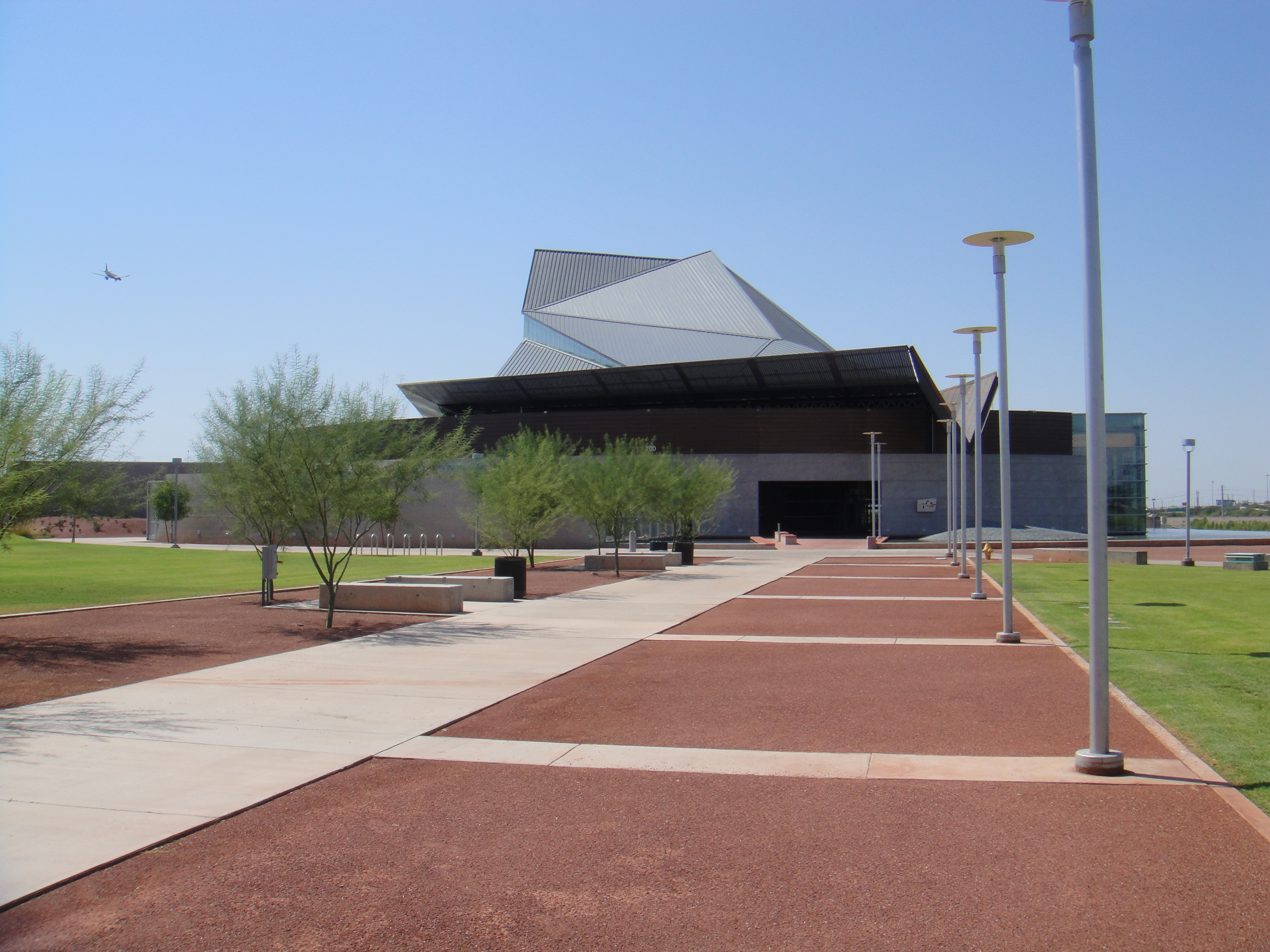
Photo looking at the East side of the building exterior.

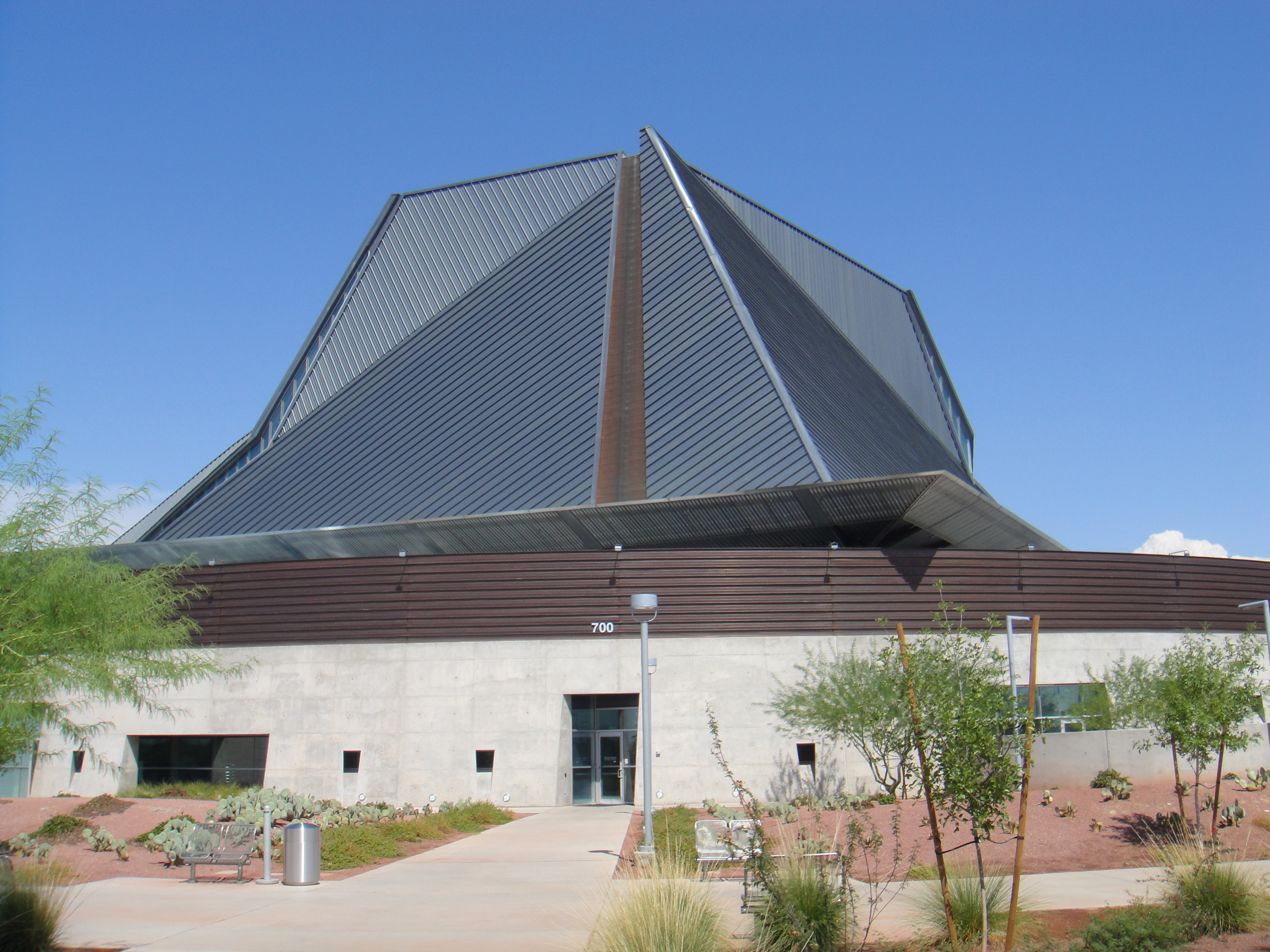
Photo looking at the West side of the building exterior.

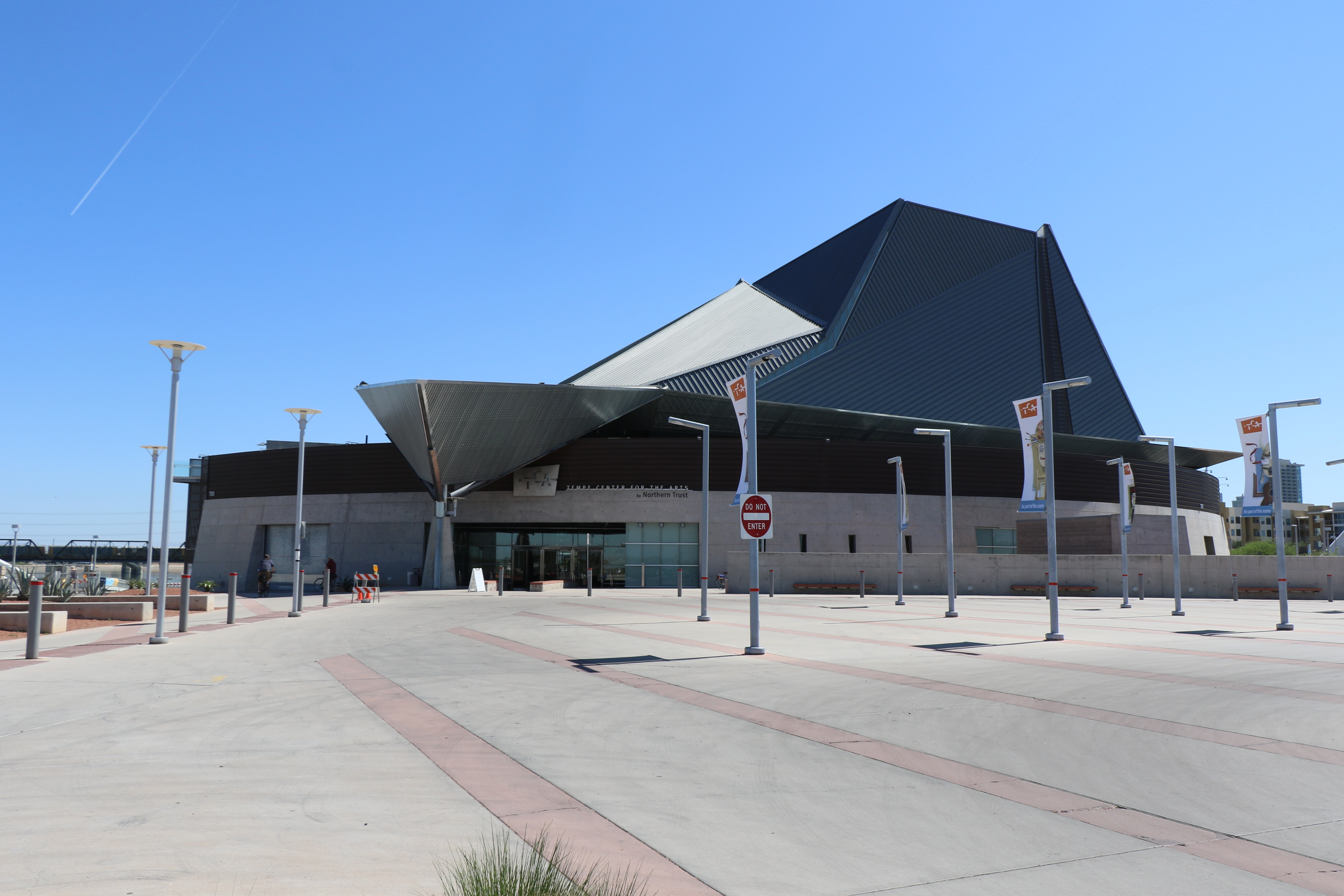
TCA Exterior

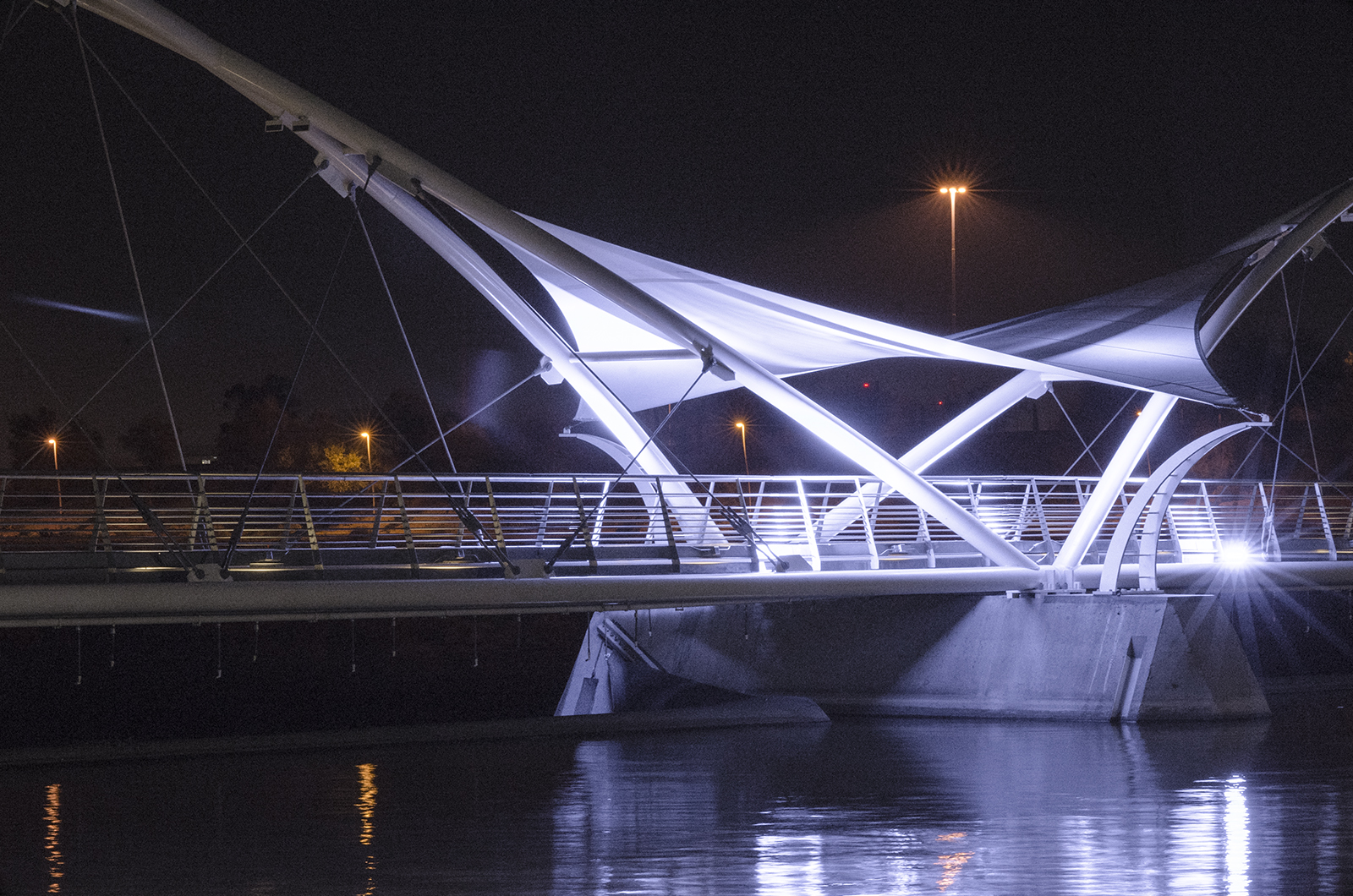
Bridge outside TCA

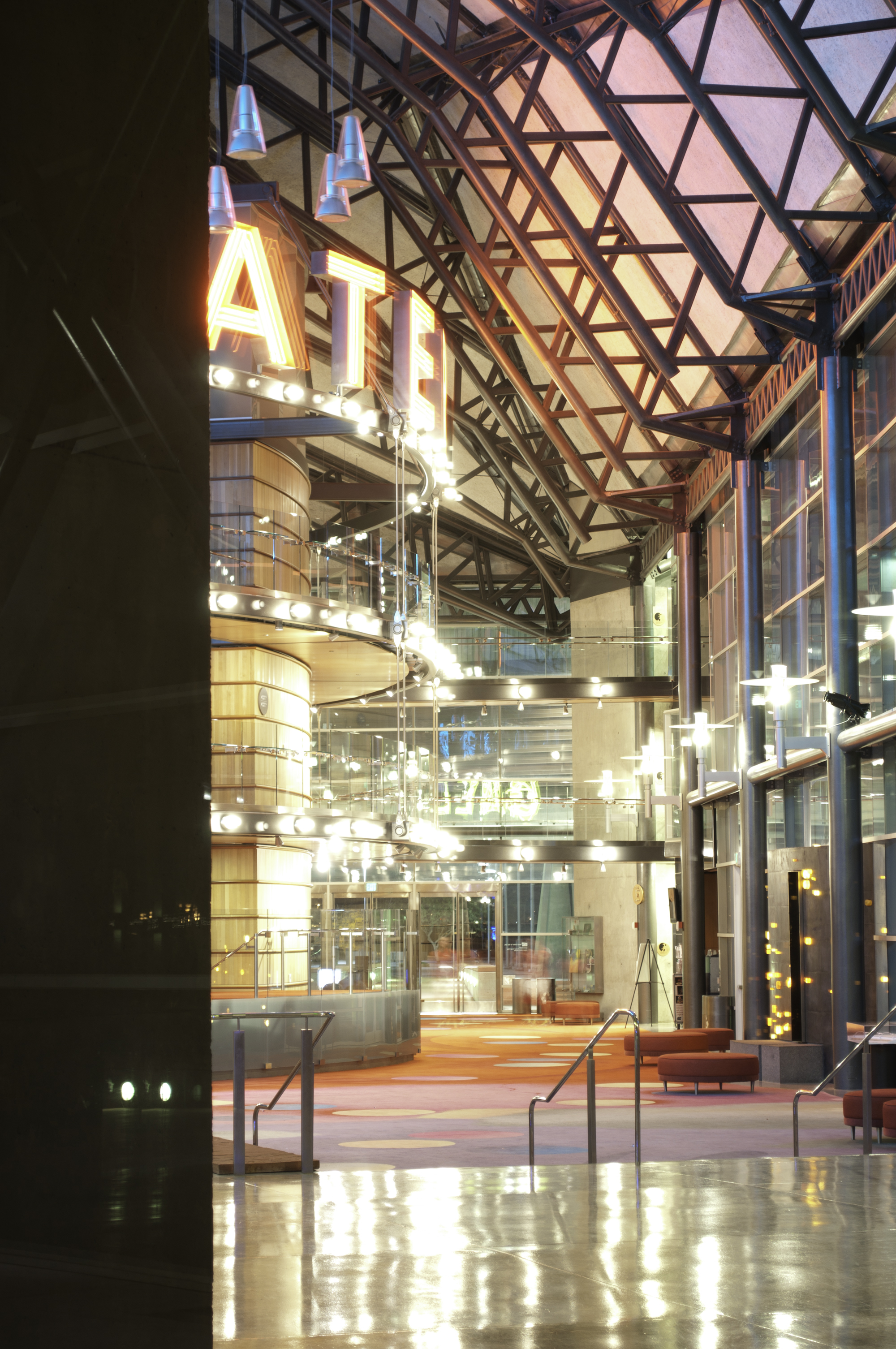
Outside TCA Theater

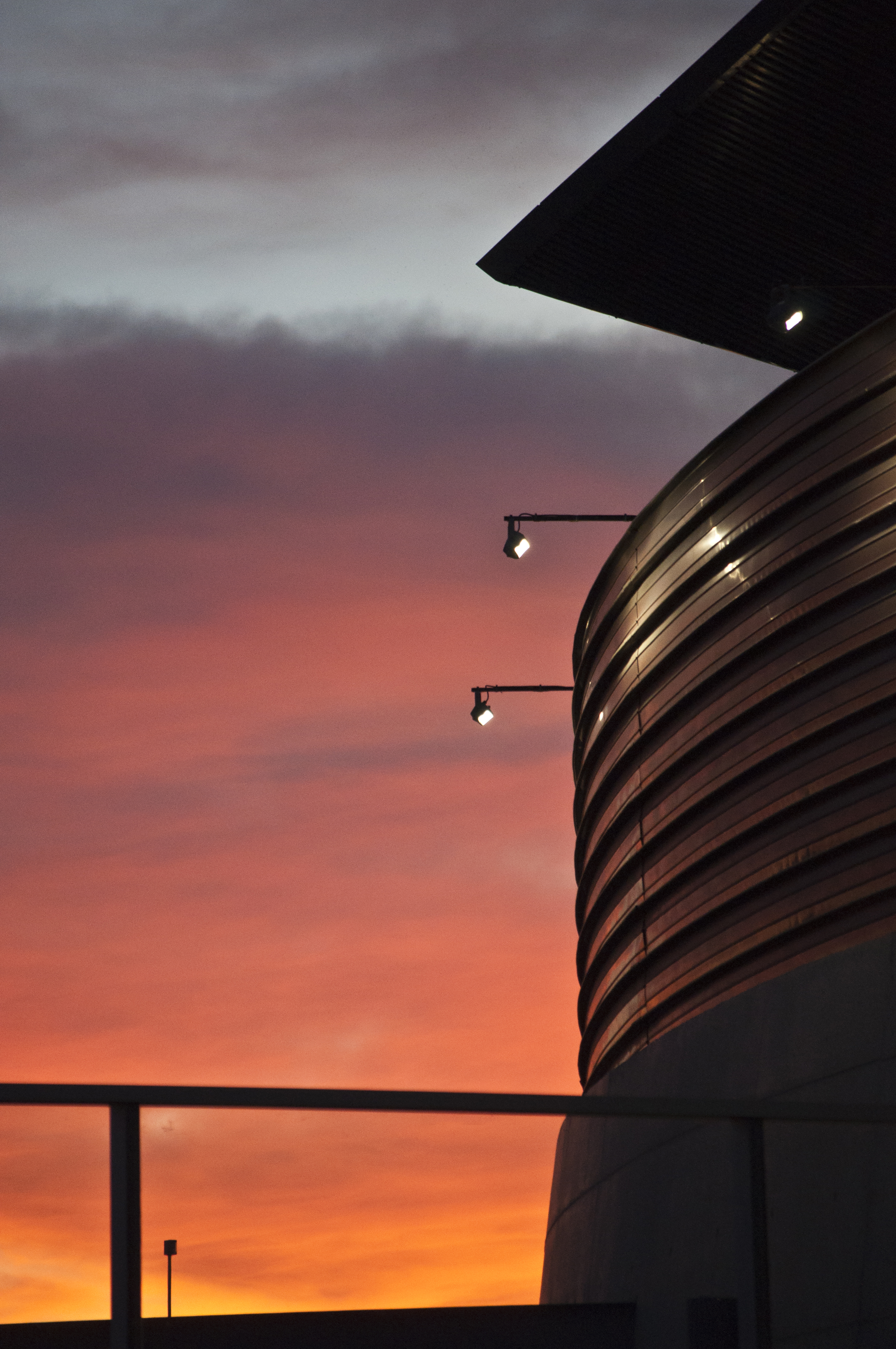
Sunset at TCA

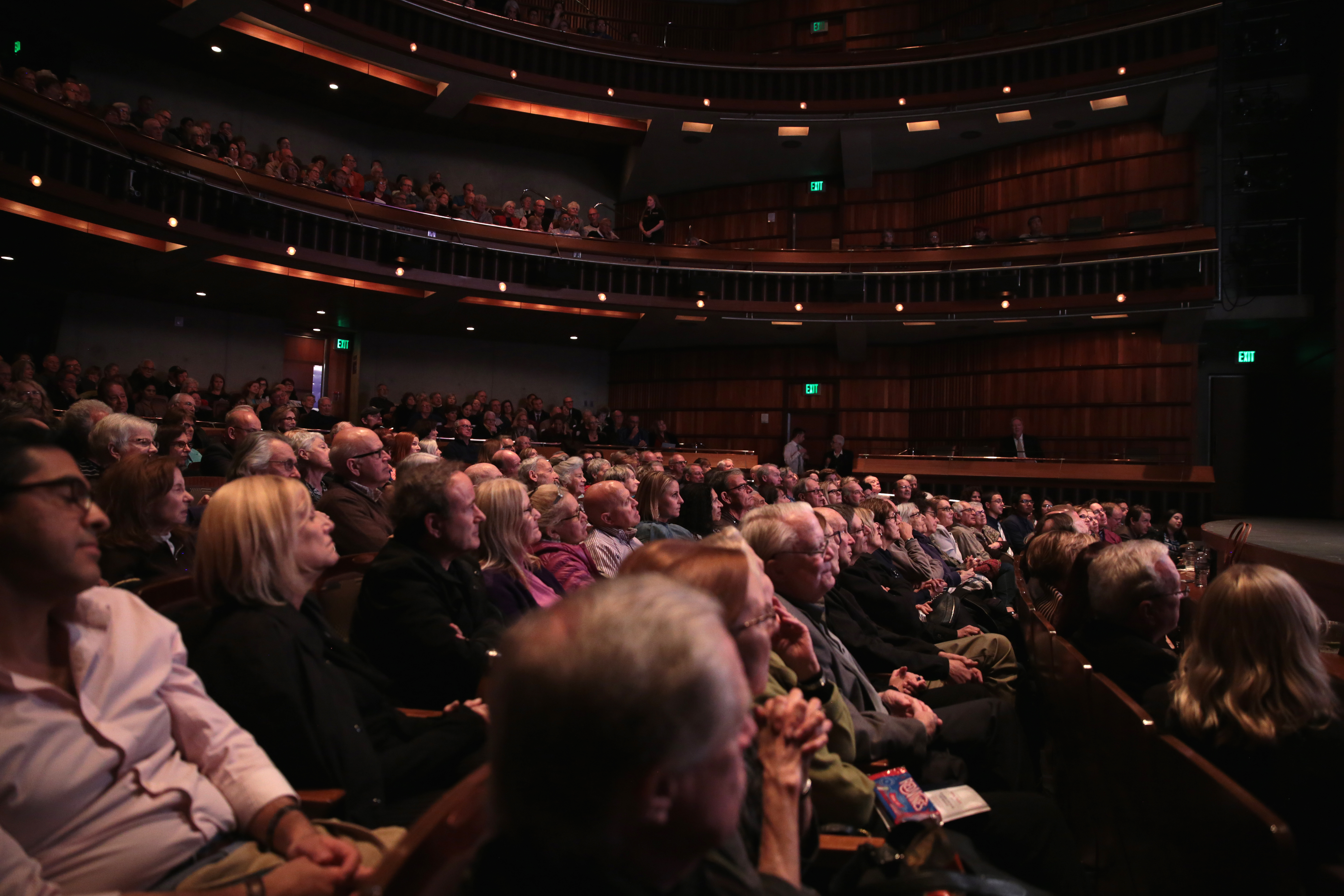
TCA Theater

== See also ==
- List of concert halls
