= The Versatile Impressions =

Studio album by The Impressions
- Released: 1969
- Genre: Chicago soul
- Label: ABC-Paramount
- Producer: Johnny Pate

The Impressions chronology
This Is My Country (1968)	The Versatile Impressions (1969)	The Young Mods' Forgotten Story (1969)

Professional ratings
Review scores
Source	Rating
Allmusic	2/5 stars

The Versatile Impressions is an album by the American soul music group the Impressions. The album was released after the Impressions left ABC Records, and only featured one original song.

The album cover was designed so that the viewer would see a different image depending on the angle of intersection between their line of sight and the cover. Byron Goto and Henry Epstein were credited for the design of the album cover.

== Track listing ==
1. "Once in a Lifetime" (Leslie Bricusse, Anthony Newley)
2. "Yesterday" (Lennon–McCartney)
3. "This Is the Life" (Lee Adams, Charles Strouse)
4. "Just Before Sunrise" (Mack David)
5. "The Look of Love" (Burt Bacharach, Hal David)
6. "Don't Cry, My Love" (Oscar Brown, Jr., Curtis Mayfield)
7. "Sermonette" (Cannonball Adderley, Jon Hendricks)
8. "East of Java" (Mack David)
9. "Oo You're a Livin' Doll" (Johnny Pate)
10. "The Fool on the Hill" (Lennon, McCartney)

== Personnel ==
The Impressions

- Curtis Mayfield - lead vocals, guitar
- Fred Cash - backing vocals
- Sam Gooden - backing vocals
- The Funk Brothers - instrumentation
