= Bobby Darin Sings The Shadow of Your Smile =

Studio album LP by Bobby Darin
- Released: April 1966
- Genre: Pop
- Length: 27:25
- Label: Atlantic
- Producer: Bobby Darin

Bobby Darin chronology
Venice Blue (1965)	Bobby Darin Sings The Shadow of Your Smile (1966)	In a Broadway Bag (Mame) (1966)

Bobby Darin Sings The Shadow of Your Smile is a studio album by the American singer Bobby Darin, released in April 1966. The album was arranged and conducted by Richard Wess (who conducted Darin's earlier albums, That's All (1959), and This is Darin (1960), and From Hello Dolly to Goodbye Charlie (1964), and Shorty Rogers. It included all the Oscar-nominated songs from 1966. It was his first album on the Atlantic label after leaving Capitol Records.

Although it didn't make either the Billboard Top LPs charts, the album debuted on the Cashbox looking ahead albums chart in the issue dated June 18, 1966, and remained on the chart for three weeks, peaking at number 110.

The album was released on compact disc by Diablo Records on October 13, 1998 as tracks 1 through 11 on a pairing of two albums on one CD, with tracks 16 through 26 consisting of Darin's 1966 album, In a Broadway Bag (Mame).

== Reception ==
Professional ratings
Review scores
Source	Rating
AllMusic	3/5 stars
The Encyclopedia of Popular Music	2/5 stars

In his AllMusic review, critic JT Griffith wrote “Darin flexed his musical muscles and covered them all... While only making a small dent in the charts, The Shadow of Your Smile was a hit with the critics.”

Billboard praised Darin's "fresh treatment of such greats as 'Liza' and 'After You've Gone'", and described the album as a "highly salable and programming LP."

Cashbox reviewed the album, writing "The tracks range from slow dreamy ballads to up-tempo rockers and are highlighted by 'Lover Come Back To Me' and the title song."

According to Variety, Darin "stylishly delivers 'The Sweetheart Tree' and 'The Ballad of Cat Ballou'."

Disc and Music Echo enjoyed the "Superb arrangement" by Shorty Rogers and Richard Wess. On the other hand, The Encyclopedia of Popular Music gave the album a two-star rating only, meaning that they believed that album was "flawed or lacking in some way."

== Track listing ==
1. "The Shadow of Your Smile" (Johnny Mandel, Paul Francis Webster) – 2:15
2. "The Sweetheart Tree" (Henry Mancini) – 2:07
3. "I Will Wait for You" (Michel Legrand, Jacques Demy) – 2:31
4. "The Ballad of Cat Ballou" (Jerry Livingston, Mack David) – 2:30
5. "What's New Pussycat?" (Burt Bacharach, Hal David) – 2:10
6. "Rainin'" (Bobby Darin) – 2:49
7. "Lover, Come Back to Me" (Sigmund Romberg, Oscar Hammerstein II) – 2:22
8. "Cute" (Neal Hefti) – 2:18
9. "After You've Gone" (Turner Layton, Henry Creamer) – 3:12
10. "It's Only a Paper Moon" (Harold Arlen, E. Y. Harburg, Billy Rose) – 2:23
11. "Liza (All the Clouds'll Roll Away)" (George Gershwin, Ira Gershwin, Gus Kahn) – 2:48

== Charts ==
Chart (1966)	Peak position
U.S. looking ahead (Cashbox)	110

== Personnel ==
- Bobby Darin – vocals
- Richard Wess – arrangements
- Shorty Rogers – arrangements
