= Kratz =

Kratz is a surname.

People surnamed Kratz include:

- Clayton Kratz (1896–1920), American Mennonite relief worker
- Corinne Kratz, American anthropologist and Africanist
- Erik Kratz (born 1980), American professional baseball catcher
- Karl-Ludwig Kratz (1941–2025), German nuclear chemist and astrophysicist
- Ken Kratz (born 1960/61), American lawyer, former district attorney of Calumet County, Wisconsin
- Kevin Kratz (born 1987), German footballer
- Marlene Kratz, fictional character from the Australian soap opera Neighbours
- Mayme Kratz (born 1958), American artist
- Reinhard Gregor Kratz (born 1957), German historian and theologian
- Sam Kratz, fictional character from the Australian soap opera Neighbours
- Torsten Kratz (born 1970), German racing driver
