= Venice Blue =

Studio album LP by Bobby Darin
- Released: May 1965
- Recorded: 1964–1965
- Genre: Pop
- Length: 29:20
- Label: Capitol
- Producer: Steve Douglas

Bobby Darin chronology
From Hello Dolly to Goodbye Charlie (1964)	Venice Blue (1965)	Bobby Darin Sings The Shadow of Your Smile (1966)

Singles from Venice Blue
- 1. "Venice Blue" Released: March 1965

Venice Blue is a studio album by American singer Bobby Darin, released in May 1965 by Capitol Records. This was his final LP for the label. The album was arranged and conducted by Richard Wess. The album featured a number of arrangements by Ernie Freeman, including two Darin compositions.

The album debuted on the Billboard Top LPs chart in the issue dated July 10, 1965, and remained on the chart for four weeks, peaking at number 132.

The single from the album, "Venice Blue" bubbled under" Billboard's Hot 100, for its sole week that began in the issue dated April 23, 1965, and peaked at number 130. and number 94 on the Cashbox singles chart and stayed on the chart for three weeks.

Venice Blue was released in the United Kingdom as I Wanna Be Around with a slightly altered cover using the same photo. A compilation CD was released by Capitol's parent company EMI in 1999 including You're the Reason I'm Living and I Wanna Be Around. It was released as one of two albums on one CD also by EMI in 2002, along with Darin's 1964 album, From Hello Dolly to Goodbye Charlie.

== Reception ==
Professional ratings
Review scores
Source	Rating
AllMusic	2.5/5 stars
The Encyclopedia of Popular Music	2/5 stars
Record Mirror	4/5 stars

In his AllMusic review, critic JT Griffith wrote "Venice Blue is not a dramatic departure for Bobby Darin, but a solid collection nonetheless. Really of interest to fans looking to complete their collection. Well-arranged and well-sung, but not the most accessible album for the neo-swing set."

Billboard notes "Darin sings and swings his heart out and proves there are future standards being written"

Cashbox said the album "includes a hand-picked batch of goodies from the recent vintage crop of pop hits, handled in the traditional Darin style."

Record World notes "Redoubtable Bobby gives his easy once-over-lightly to this set of tunes."

In its review of the album from November 1965 as I Wanna Be Around, Record Mirror noted that "His own "You Just Don't Know" is, surprisingly, a stand-out track."

== Track listing ==
1. "Venice Blue" (Bobby Darin, Charles Aznavour, Gene Lees) – 2:36
2. "I Wanna Be Around" (Johnny Mercer, Sadie Vimmerstadt) – 2:12
3. "Somewhere" (Leonard Bernstein, Stephen Sondheim) – 2:34
4. "The Good Life" (Sacha Distel, Jack Reardon) – 2:25
5. "Dear Heart" (Ray Evans, Jay Livingston, Henry Mancini) – 3:14
6. "Softly, As I Leave You" (Giorgio Calabrese, Hal Shaper, Tony De Vita) – 2:57
7. "You Just Don't Know" (Darin) – 2:25
8. "There Ain't No Sweet Gal Worth the Salt of My Tears" (Fred Fisher) – 3:03
9. "Who Can I Turn To?" (Leslie Bricusse, Anthony Newley) – 2:39
10. "A Taste of Honey" (Ric Marlow, Bobby Scott) – 2:36
11. "In a World Without You" (Rudy Clark, Darin) – 3:11

== Charts ==
Chart (1965)	Peak position
U.S. Top LPs (Billboard)	132

=== Singles ===
Year	Title	U.S. Hot 100	U.S. Cashbox
1965	"Venice Blue"	133	94

== Personnel ==
- Bobby Darin – vocals
- Richard Wess – arrangements
- Ernie Freeman – arrangements
- René Hall, Carol Kaye, Tommy Tedesco – guitar
- Chuck Berghofer, Joe Mondragon – bass guitar
- Earl Palmer – drums
- Emil Richards – tympani, maracas, vibes
- Ray Johnson – piano
- Bill Pitman, Tony Terran – trumpet
- Milt Bernhart, Harry Betts, Lou Blackburn, Lew McCreary, Dick Nash, Ken Shroyer, Dave Wells – trombone
- Bill Green, Paul Horn, Plas Johnson – saxophone
