= This Is Darin =

Studio album by Bobby Darin
- Released: January 1960
- Recorded: 1959
- Genre: Pop
- Length: 38:51
- Label: Atco
- Producer: Ahmet Ertegün, Nesuhi Ertegun

Bobby Darin chronology
That's All (1959)	This Is Darin (1960)	Darin at the Copa (1960)

Singles from This Is Darin
- 1. "Clementine" Released: March 1960

This Is Darin is the third album by American singer Bobby Darin, released in January 1960. Richard Wess arranged and conducted the material for the album. Darin and Wess had team up That's All (1959), and would team up again for From Hello Dolly to Goodbye Charlie (1964), and Bobby Darin Sings the Shadow of Your Smile (1966).

The album debuted on the Billboard Best Selling LPs chart in the issue dated March 7, 1960, and remained on the chart for 50 weeks, peaking at number six, his highest charting album. It also debuted on the Cashbox albums chart in the issue dated February 13, 1960, and remained on the chart for a total of 44 weeks, peaking at number five. In the UK, it spent nine weeks on the albums chart, peaking at number four.

The single from the album, "Clementine", debuted on the Billboard Hot 100 in the issue dated March 21, 1960, and peaked at number 21 during an eight-week stay on the chart. The song peaked at number 8 on the UK singles chart in a 12-week stay. It reached number 13 on the Cashbox singles chart and stayed on the chart for nine weeks.

The album was released on compact disc by Ais / Black Coffee Records on May 22, 2012, as tracks 1 through 12 on a pairing of two albums on one CD, with tracks 13 through 24 consisting of Darin's 1959 album, That's All.

This Is Darin was included in a box set entitled Original Album Series, which contains five of his studio albums, and was released on March 1, 2010.

== Reception ==
Professional ratings
Review scores
Source	Rating
AllMusic	3/5 stars
DownBeat	3/5 stars
The Encyclopedia of Popular Music	3/5 stars
The New Rolling Stone Album Guide	3.5/5 stars
MusicHound	2/5 stars

Music critic J.T. Griffith wrote in his Allmusic review, "This Is Darin showcases his confident phrasing with some moments of humor and a few trademark 'hut hut's (six in the first song!)... Gone is the bobby-sock rock of 'Splish Splash' and even the crossover appeal of 'Mack the Knife.' In its place is a more mature Bobby Darin aiming for adult—not pop—credibility... This Is Darin is highly recommended if you have long since tired of the Swingers soundtrack and want to discover Darin's more traditional fare."

Billboard notes "Dick Wess exciting swinging backgrounds again showcase Darin's artful, stimulating vocal style on a group of nostalgic standards and a couple of originals"

Cashbox in its Popular Picks of The Weeks Reviews notes "Richard Wess is the guiding light behind the clever but effective arrangements, noticeably on the swinging version of “Clementine” and the pulsating “Caravan”

In the Show I'll Never Forget, Sean Manning describes the album as "a wonderful Sinatra-school album.

== Track listing ==
=== Side one ===
1. "Clementine" (Woody Harris) – 3:13
2. "Have You Got Any Castles, Baby?" (Johnny Mercer, Richard A. Whiting) – 3:33
3. "Don't Dream of Anybody But Me" (Neal Hefti, Bart Howard) – 4:08
4. "My Gal Sal" (Paul Dresser) – 2:06
5. "Black Coffee" (Sonny Burke, Paul Francis Webster) – 3:59
6. "Caravan" (Duke Ellington, Irving Mills, Juan Tizol) – 2:58

=== Side two ===
1. "Guys and Dolls" (Frank Loesser) – 2:10
2. "Down With Love" (E.Y. Harburg, Harold Arlen, Burton Lane) – 2:55
3. "Pete Kelly's Blues" (Sammy Cahn, Ray Heindorf) – 4:10
4. All Nite Long" (Woody Harris) – 2:57
5. "The Gal That Got Away" (Harold Arlen, Ira Gershwin) – 4:03
6. "I Can't Give You Anything but Love" (Jimmy McHugh, Dorothy Fields) – 2:39

== Charts ==
Chart (1960)	Peak position
US Billboard Top LPs	6
US Cash Box	5
UK Albums Chart	4

=== Singles ===
Year	Title	U.S. Hot 100	UK	U.S. Cashbox
1960	"Clementine"	21	8	13

== Personnel ==
- Bobby Darin – vocals
- Richard Wess – arranger, conductor
- Cover photo and design: Garrett/Howard
- Supervision: Ahmet Ertegun & Nesuhi Ertegun
