= Eileen Herlie =

British actress (1918–2008)

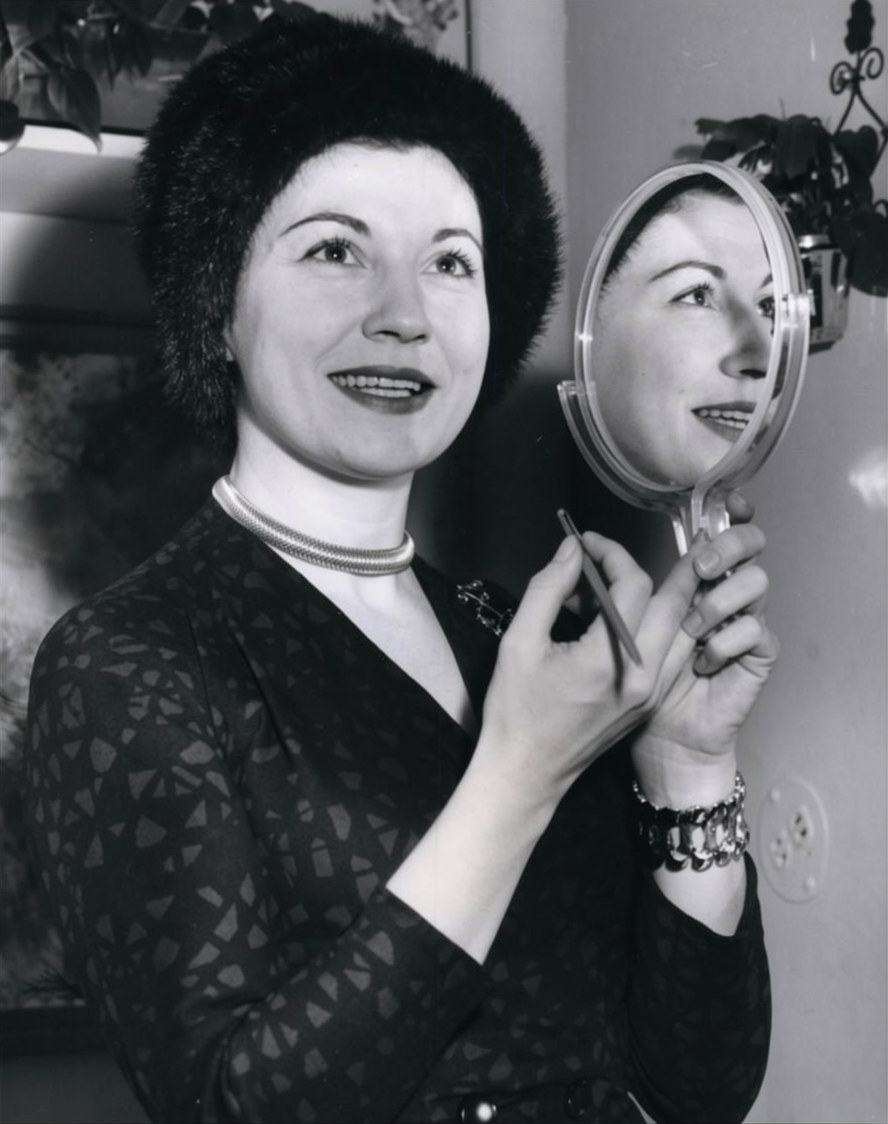
- Herlie in 1959
- Born: Eileen Isobel Herlihy; 8 March 1918; Glasgow, Lanarkshire, Scotland
- Died: 8 October 2008 (aged 90); New York City, US
- Occupation: Actress
- Years active: 1938–2008

Eileen Herlie (8 March 1918 – 8 October 2008) was a Scottish actress.

== Personal life ==
Eileen Herlie was born Eileen Isobel Herlihy to an Irish Catholic father, Patrick Herlihy, and a Scottish Protestant mother, Isobel Cowden, in Glasgow, Scotland, and was one of five children. She attended Shawlands Academy, on the city's southside. Herlie was trained as a theatre actress. Among her West End London theatre successes were The Eagle Has Two Heads by Jean Cocteau. She was married twice, to Philip Barrett (m 1942) and Witold Kuncewicz (m 1951), both marriages ending in divorce. She had no children. In 1955 she moved permanently to the United States, where she lived and worked for the last fifty-three years of her life.

== Career ==
Against the wishes of her parents, she chose to become an actress when she joined the non-professional touring company Scottish National Players in 1938. She subsequently toured with the semi-professional Rutherglen Repertory Company. In 1942 she moved to England to work as a professional actress.

Her first role in the London theatre in 1942 was as the second Mrs de Winter in Daphne du Maurier's stage adaptation of her own novel Rebecca.

In 1945, at the Shakespeare Memorial Theatre in Stratford-upon-Avon she played the role of Gertrude for the first of three times, opposite the Hamlet of Peter Glenville, who also directed the production. At 27 she was four years younger than her 31-year-old stage son.

In 1946 she made her first film appearance, playing the supporting role of Katherine in an adaptation by Daphne du Maurier of her own novel Hungry Hill.

In the same year, Sir Alexander Korda placed her under contract to his London Films company. However, she would make only two films for him: The Angel with the Trumpet in 1949 and The Story of Gilbert and Sullivan in 1952. Her remaining three British films - Isn't Life Wonderful!, shot in 1952, For Better, for Worse, shot in 1954, and She Didn't Say No!, shot in 1957 - were made for the Associated British Picture Corporation (ABPC). In 1951 she made her first television appearance in the leading role of Regina in a BBC TV adaptation of Lillian Hellman's stage play The Little Foxes.

Herlie's first big film break was being cast by Laurence Olivier in his screen adaptation of William Shakespeare's Hamlet, shot in 1947. She played Hamlet's mother, Gertrude, for the second time. On this occasion, at 29, she was eleven years younger than her 40-year-old stage son (Olivier).

Herlie played Gertrude again, for the third and final time, in the 1964 Broadway production starring Richard Burton, and also in the 1964 film version of the production. At 46 she was now older than her stage son (Burton), who was 38, but by only eight years.

Herlie's other American film appearances in the 1960s were roles in Freud: The Secret Passion (1962), and The Sea Gull (1968), the first major film version in English of Anton Chekhov's celebrated play. (The second was her last feature film.)

In 1955, Herlie made her Broadway debut as Irene Molloy in The Matchmaker (which was later made into the musical Hello, Dolly!). In 1960, she was nominated for a Tony Award as 'Best Actress in a Musical' for Take Me Along, an adaptation of Eugene O'Neill's Ah, Wilderness!, in which she played opposite Jackie Gleason. In 1962, she co-starred with Ray Bolger in All American, where they sang "Once Upon a Time". Also on Broadway, she appeared in Photo Finish (1963) and Halfway Up the Tree (1967), both written by Peter Ustinov, and Crown Matrimonial, in which she played Queen Mary (1973). She had previously played Queen Mary in the 1972 made-for-television film The Woman I Love, starring Richard Chamberlain as Edward VIII and Faye Dunaway as Wallis Simpson. When Crown Matrimonial was telecast on the Hallmark Hall of Fame in 1974, however, the role of Queen Mary went to film actress Greer Garson.

On 18 May 1976, Herlie made the move to television soap operas in the role of Myrtle Fargate on All My Children, playing the role for virtually the rest of her life. In the 1980s, Herlie was nominated for three consecutive Daytime Emmy Awards (1984, 1985 and 1986). She became close friends with fellow cast member Louis Edmonds, and spoke at his funeral in 2001. Until the late 1990s, Herlie was one of the few actresses to portray the same character on three different soaps. In 1993, she portrayed Myrtle on the All My Children sister-soap Loving. In December 2000, she began portraying Myrtle in crossover appearances on the soap opera One Life to Live, where a 'Who's the Daddy?' storyline was playing out on all four ABC soaps (All My Children, One Life to Live, General Hospital and the now-cancelled Port Charles). She last appeared in June 2008, a few months shy of her death.

== Death ==
On 8 October 2008, at the age of 90, Eileen Herlie died of complications from pneumonia.

On 19 December 2008, All My Children dedicated the episode to Herlie and her character Myrtle by having the characters closest to Myrtle celebrate her life in a room named after her. Toward the end, Agnes Nixon, All My Children's creator, entered and blew a kiss toward Myrtle's portrait.

== Award nominations ==
Daytime Emmy Award nominations

- (1986) Outstanding Supporting Actress in a Drama Series for All My Children
- (1985) Outstanding Actress in a Supporting Role in a Daytime Drama Series for All My Children
- (1984) Outstanding Actress in a Supporting Role in a Daytime Drama Series for All My Children

Tony Award nominations

- (1960) Best Actress in a Musical for Take Me Along
