= Mack the Knife =

1928 song by Bertolt Brecht and Kurt Weill

- by Kurt Weill
- Native name: Die Moritat von Mackie Messer
- Genre: Moritat
- Text: Bertolt Brecht
- Language: German
- Published: 31 August 1928

"Mack the Knife" or "The Ballad of Mack the Knife" (German: "Die Moritat von Mackie Messer") is a song composed by Kurt Weill with lyrics by Bertolt Brecht for their 1928 music drama The Threepenny Opera (German: Die Dreigroschenoper). The song tells of a knife-wielding criminal of the London underworld named Macheath, the "Mack the Knife" of the title.

The song has become a popular standard recorded by many artists after it was recorded by Louis Armstrong in 1955 with translated lyrics by Marc Blitzstein. The most popular version of the song was by Bobby Darin in 1959, whose recording became a number one hit in the US and UK and earned him two Grammys at the 2nd Annual Grammy Awards. Ella Fitzgerald also received a Grammy for her performance of the song in 1961.

== The Threepenny Opera ==
Composer and lyricist of "Mack the Knife"

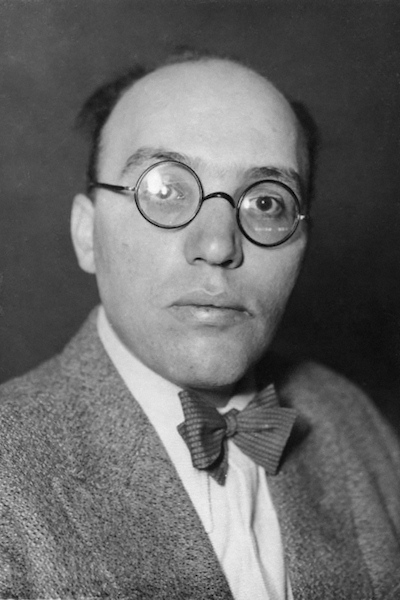
Kurt Weill

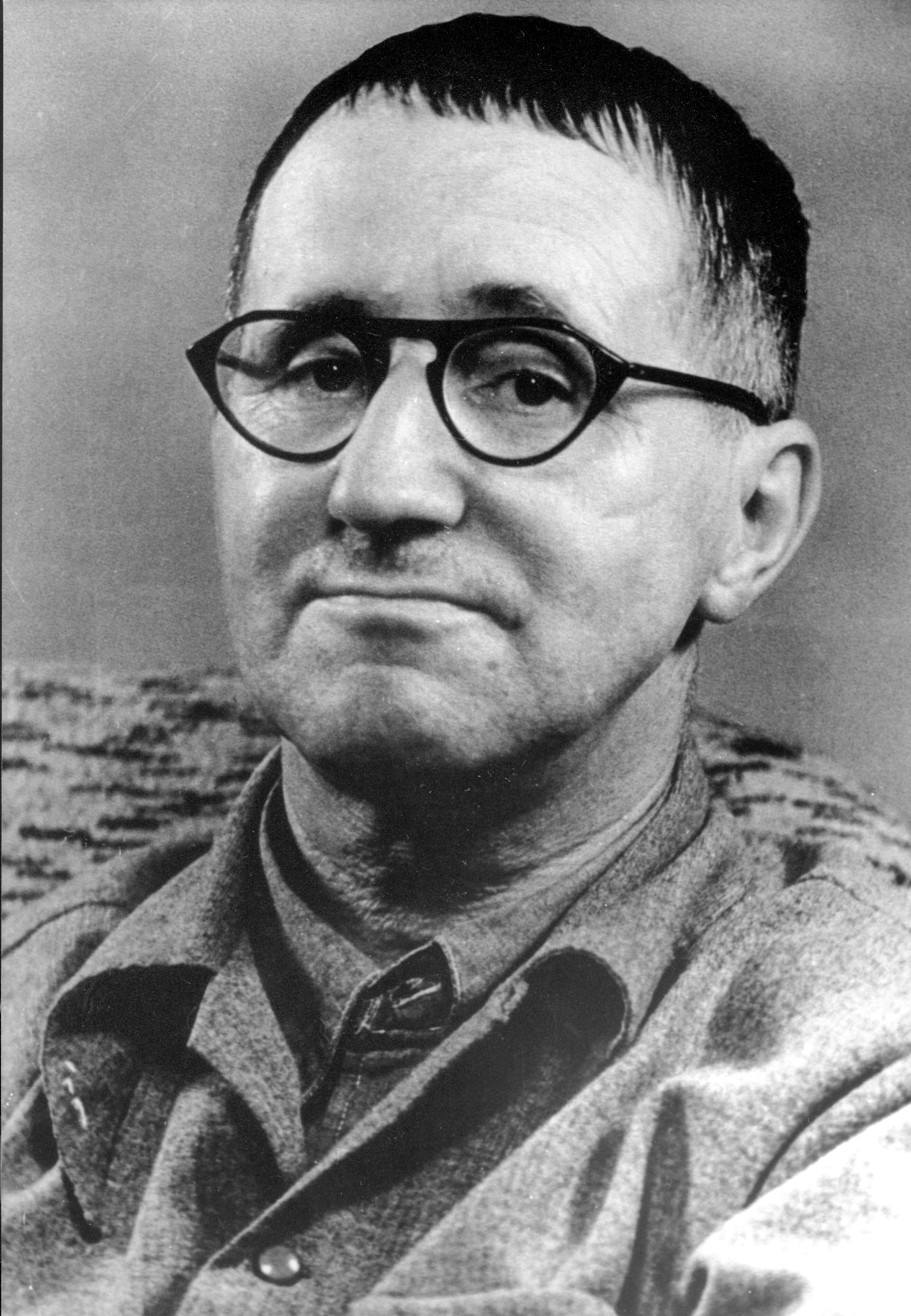
Bertolt Brecht

A Moritat is a medieval version of the murder ballad performed by strolling minstrels. In The Threepenny Opera, the Moritat singer, playing his street organ, introduces and closes the drama with the tale of the deadly Mackie Messer, or Mack the Knife, a character based on the dashing highwayman Macheath in John Gay's The Beggar's Opera (who was in turn based on the historical thief Jack Sheppard). The Brecht-Weill version of the character was far more cruel and sinister—his crimes included rape and murder, transforming him into a modern antihero.

The song was a last-minute addition that was inserted before its premiere in 1928 because Harald Paulsen, the actor who played Macheath, demanded that Brecht and Weill add another number that would more effectively introduce his character. However, Weill and Brecht decided the song should not be sung by Macheath himself, opting instead to write the song for a street singer in keeping with the Moritat tradition. At the premiere, the song was sung by Kurt Gerron, who played Police Chief Brown. Weill intended the Moritat to be accompanied by a barrel organ, which was to be played by the singer. At the premiere, though, the barrel organ failed, and the pit orchestra (a jazz band) had to quickly provide the accompaniment for the street singer.

The Moritat singer introduces the play, first comparing Macheath to a shark:

Und der Haifisch, der hat Zähne,
Und die trägt er im Gesicht.
Und Macheath, der hat ein Messer,
Doch das Messer sieht man nicht.

Translation:

And the shark, it has teeth,
And it wears them in the face.
And Macheath, he has a knife,
But the knife can't be seen.

This is followed by tales of his crimes including a murder on the Strand, the disappearance of a wealthy man and theft of his money, a fatal stabbing of a woman, an arson that killed seven children in Soho, and the rape of a young widow.

The final stanza – not included in the original play, but added by Brecht for the 1931 film – expresses the theme and compares the glittering world of the rich and powerful with the dark world of the poor:

Denn die einen sind im Dunkeln
Und die andern sind im Licht
Und man siehet die im Lichte
Die im Dunkeln sieht man nicht.

Translation:

There are some who are in darkness
And the others are in light
And you see the ones in brightness
Those in darkness drop from sight.

The original German lyrics and music of the song entered the public domain in the United States in 2024.

=== French translation ===
The song was translated into French as "La complainte de Mackie" by André Mauprey and Ninon Steinhoff and popularized by Catherine Sauvage.

=== 1954 Blitzstein translation ===
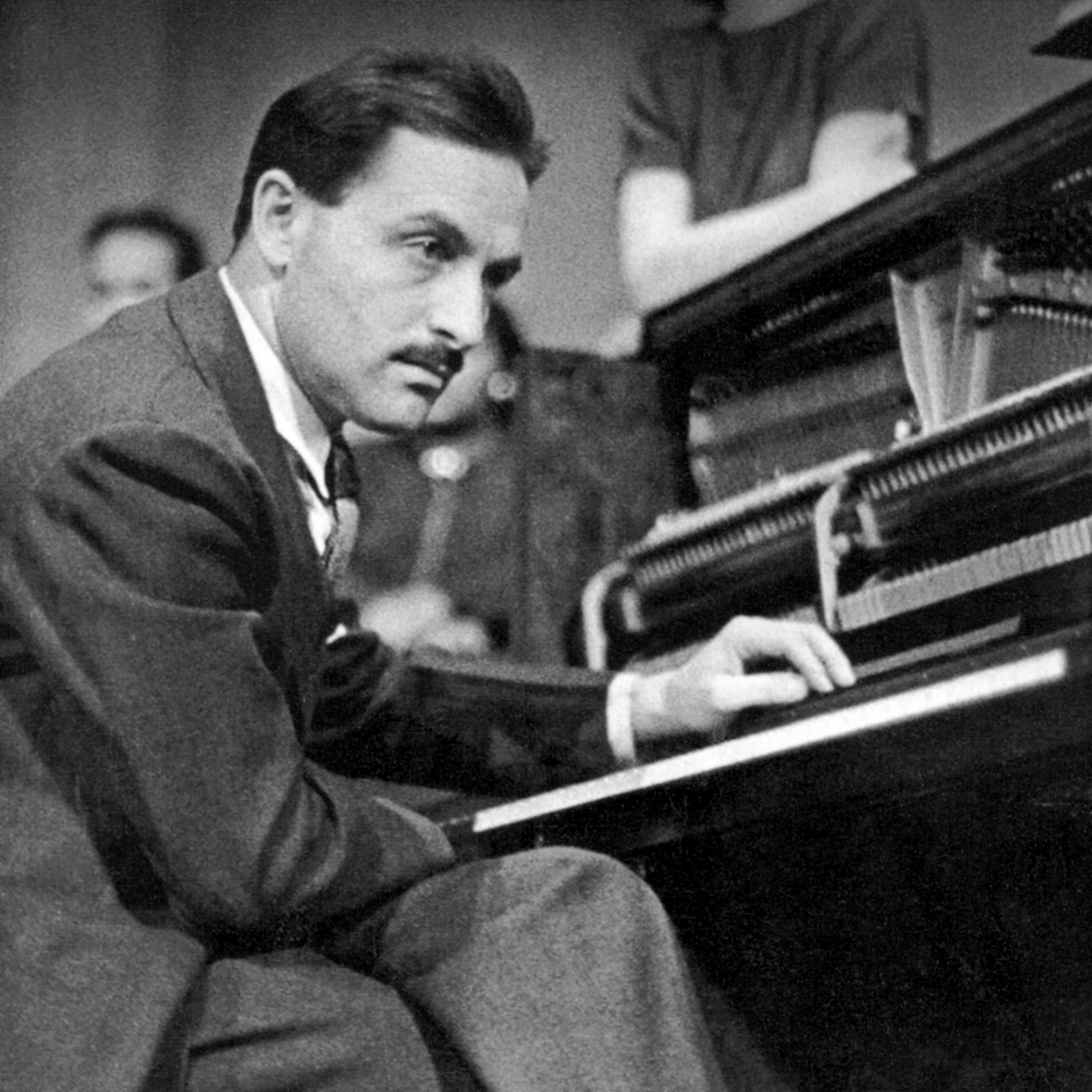
Marc Blitzstein translated the best-known English version of the song

The song was introduced to American audiences in 1933 in the first English-language production of The Threepenny Opera. The English lyrics were by Gifford Cochran and Jerrold Krimsky. That production, however, was not successful, closing after a run of only ten days. The best-known English translation of the song comes from Marc Blitzstein's 1954 version of The Threepenny Opera, which played off-Broadway for over six years. The opening stanza reads:

Oh, the shark has pretty teeth, dear,
And he shows them pearly white
Just a jack-knife has Macheath, dear
And he keeps it out of sight

Blitzstein's version is a loose translation of the German lyrics; some lines on the crimes of Macheath have been omitted, and he included a verse not in the original, giving a list of female characters in the drama. The lyrics were further sanitized in the original Broadway cast recording (with Gerald Price as the ballad singer) with two stanzas on Macheath's assaults on women replaced.

Blitzstein's translation forms the basis of most of the popular versions heard today, including those by Louis Armstrong (1955) and Bobby Darin (1959), and most subsequent swing versions. Some further changes were made to Blitzstein's lyrics, for example, in Armstrong's recording, the name of Weill's widow, Lotte Lenya, who was the star of both the original 1928 German production and the 1954 Blitzstein Broadway version, was added to the lyrics "(Look out, Miss Lotte Lenya)".

=== 1976 Manheim–Willett translation ("Moritat") ===
In 1976, a brand-new interpretation of "Mack the Knife" by Ralph Manheim and John Willett was used in the New York Shakespeare Festival's production of The Threepenny Opera, starring Raul Julia as Macheath. This version, simply known as "Moritat", is a more direct translation of the original German. Here is an excerpt:

See the shark with teeth like razors.
All can read his open face.
And Macheath has got a knife, but
Not in such an obvious place.

This version was performed by Lyle Lovett on the soundtrack of the 1994 film Quiz Show. Darin's version plays over the opening credits and Lovett's over the closing credits. This interpretation was performed by Sting on Hal Willner's 1985 Weill tribute album Lost in the Stars and also recorded by Nick Cave for the 1997 tribute album September Songs – The Music of Kurt Weill.

=== 1994 translation ===
A much darker translation by Robert David MacDonald and Jeremy Sams into English was used for the 1994 Donmar Warehouse theatrical production in London. The new translation attempted to recapture the original tone of the song:

Though the shark's teeth may be lethal
Still you see them white and red
But you won't see Mackie's flick knife
Cause he slashed you and you're dead.

== Popular recordings ==
"A Theme from The Threepenny Opera (Mack the Knife)"
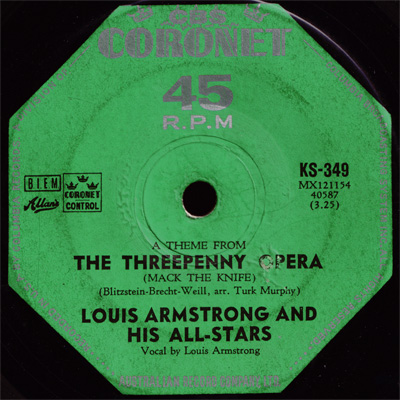

Single by Louis Armstrong
- B-side: "Back O'Town Blues"
- Released: November 1955
- Recorded: New York City; 28 September 1955
- Genre: Jazz
- Length: 3:25
- Label: Columbia, Coronet
- Songwriters: Kurt Weill; Bertolt Brecht; Marc Blitzstein (English lyrics); Turk Murphy (arranger)

=== Louis Armstrong version ===
A number of early artists recorded the song, including the cast recording and a jazz version by Sidney Bechet, but it was Louis Armstrong who first introduced the vocal version of "Mack the Knife" to the United States hit parade. George Avakian, a producer at Columbia Records, whose wife Anahid Ajemian gave a recital of Weill's Violin Concerto in 1954, became interested in Weill's music, in particular the song from the off-Broadway production of Three Penny Opera that he had seen. He spent a few months trying to interest various jazz artists from his label to record "Mack the Knife", eventually persuading Turk Murphy to record. Murphy also suggested Armstrong to Avakian for the recording, and made an arrangement of the song for him.

Armstrong recorded an instrumental together with a vocal version on 28 September 1955, while Murphy also recorded both instrumental version and vocal versions himself as well as one in German with Lotte Lenya on 22 September 1955. The lyrics of Armstrong's version were based on the Broadway cast recording, but Avakian suggested changing Blitzstein's lyrics by using the word "drooping" instead of "dropping", as well as including the name of Lotte Lenya in the recording. Armstrong names Lenya in the song, as she was invited to the recording session by Avakian. Lenya also joined Armstrong to record a duet version which was not released commercially in their lifetime, but was released posthumously in 1982.

The version released by Armstrong was spliced together from the instrumental and the vocal recordings. The song, titled "A Theme from The Threepenny Opera (Mack the Knife)", was released in late 1955 together with an instrumental version by Murphy, both by Columbia. The song, however, faced an initial ban by radio stations for lyrics perceived as glorification of a criminal, although it sold well. Armstrong's recording reached Billboard's Top 100 chart in February 1956, peaking at No 20 on 17 March 1956. An instrumental version released by Dick Hyman charted higher. Armstrong's version also reached No. 8 in the UK.

In 1997, the 1955 recording of the song by Louis Armstrong & His All-Stars on Columbia Records was inducted into the Grammy Hall of Fame.

Armstrong's recording was inducted by the Library of Congress in the National Recording Registry in 2016.

==== Charts ====
Chart (1956)	Peak position
Netherlands (Single Top 100)	3
UK Singles (Official Charts)	8
US The Top 100 (Billboard)	20

=== Bobby Darin version ===
"Mack the Knife"

Single by Bobby Darin

from the album That's All
- B-side: "Was There a Call for Me"
- Released: August 1959
- Recorded: 19 December 1958
- Genre: Traditional pop; jazz; lounge
- Length: 3:11 (album version); 3:04 (single version)
- Label: Atco (U.S.); London Records (UK)
- Songwriters: Kurt Weill, Bertolt Brecht; Marc Blitzstein (English version)

Bobby Darin singles chronology
"Dream Lover" (1959)	"Mack the Knife" (1959)	"Beyond the Sea" (1959)

The song, however, is most closely associated with Bobby Darin, who recorded his version on 19 December 1958 for his album That's All. Darin had performed the song in his act before, and wanted to include the song in an album of standards. The song was arranged by Richard Wess. Musicians who played on the song included Don Lamond on drums, Milt Hinton on bass, and Doc Severinsen on trumpet. Tom Dowd engineered the recording. Darin's version has similar lyrics to Armstrong's but with small changes, such as using the word "babe" instead of "dear", and he ended the song with a reprise of the sixth verse instead of the first. Darin recorded the song in around three takes, performing the song with an up-tempo bouncy beat and modulating up a semitone every verse starting with the third verse, from B♭ to B to C to D♭ to E♭.

The song was released as a single in August 1959, even though Darin was reluctant to do so. Dick Clark had advised Darin not to record the song because of the perception that, having come from an opera, the song might not appeal to a rock and roll audience; he subsequently acknowledged his error. The song reached number one on the Billboard Hot 100, Darin's only number 1 hit on that chart. It was listed as a Cash Box Top 100 number one single in 1959 for eight weeks.

==== Reception ====
Frank Sinatra (who would record his own version in the 1980s with Quincy Jones for his L.A. Is My Lady album) called Darin's the "definitive" version.

Bobby Darin took the song by the scruff of the neck and turned it into the swing classic widely known today. Unlike the Brecht-Weill original, which remains in the same key throughout, Darin's version changes key, chromatically, no fewer than five times, ratcheting up the tension. – Financial Times

Billboard ranked this version as the No. 2 song for 1959. In 2003, the Darin version was ranked No. 251 on Rolling Stone's "500 Greatest Songs of All Time" list. Darin's version of the song was featured in the films Quiz Show and What Women Want.

The song earned Darin two Grammy Awards in 1959, for Record of the Year and first ever Best New Artist. Darin's version was also inducted by the Library of Congress in the National Recording Registry at the same time as Armstrong's in 2016. It was ranked as No. 15 in the list of Songs of the Century by the Recording Industry of America and the National Endowment for the Arts.

In 1999, the 1959 release of the song by Bobby Darin on the Atco Records label was inducted into the Grammy Hall of Fame.

==== Charts ====
Chart (1959)	Peak position
Belgium (Ultratop 50 Flanders)	11
Belgium (Ultratop 50 Wallonia)	15
Canada (CHUM Hit Parade)	1
Netherlands (Single Top 100)	14
Norway (VG-lista)	9
UK Singles (Official Charts)	1
US Billboard Hot 100	1
US Cash Box Top 100	1
West Germany (GfK)	31

=== All-time charts ===
All-time chart performance for "Mack the Knife"
Chart	Position
US Billboard Hot 100	4

==== Certifications ====
Region	Certification	Certified units/sales
United Kingdom (BPI)	Silver	200,000^{‡}
United States (RIAA)	Platinum	1,000,000^{‡}
^{‡} Sales+streaming figures based on certification alone.

=== Ella Fitzgerald version ===
"Mack the Knife"

Single by Ella Fitzgerald

from the album Ella in Berlin: Mack the Knife
- B-side: "Lorelei"
- Released: April 1960
- Recorded: 13 February 1960, at Deutschlandhalle, Berlin
- Genre: Jazz
- Length: 4:42
- Label: Verve Records
- Songwriters: Kurt Weill, Bertolt Brecht; Marc Blitzstein (English version)

On 13 February 1960, Ella Fitzgerald performed the song live for the first time in a concert at Deutschlandhalle in Berlin. Fitzgerald, however, forgot the lyrics after the first stanza, and she improvised new lyrics, including name-checking Louis Armstrong and Bobby Darin. The song was included on the album Ella in Berlin: Mack the Knife released in July.

The song was released as a single in April 1960. This version made the US Hot 100, peaking at No. 27 in June 1960. This song was Fitzgerald's best performing song in the 1960s, and she included the song in all her subsequent shows.

The performance earned Fitzgerald a Grammy Award for Best Female Pop Vocal Performance at the 3rd Annual Grammy Awards.

==== Charts ====
Chart (1960)	Peak position
UK Singles (Official Charts)	19
US Billboard Hot 100	27
US Hot R&B/Hip-Hop Songs (Billboard)	6
US Cash Box Top 100	31

=== Instrumental versions ===
An instrumental version of "Mack the Knife" titled "Moritat – A Theme From "The Three Penny Opera"" was recorded by Dick Hyman, and it performed better than Louis Armstrong's vocal version that charted around the same time, reaching No. 9 on Billboard's Top 100. It also reached No. 9 on the Cashbox chart, as well as No. 9 on the UK chart in 1956. A number of other instrumental versions also appeared on The Top 100 at the same time: Richard Hayman and Jan August (No. 12), Lawrence Welk (No. 31), Billy Vaughn (No. 37), and Les Paul and Mary Ford (No. 49). Billy Vaughn also reached No. 12 in the UK.

Jazz saxophonist Sonny Rollins recorded an instrumental version titled simply "Moritat" for his album Saxophone Colossus, recorded in 1956. A 1959 instrumental performance by Bill Haley & His Comets was the final song the group recorded for Decca Records. Ray Conniff recorded a version for orchestra and chorus in 1962 for the album, The Happy Beat. Liberace performed the song in five styles: as originally written, in the style of the "Blue Danube Waltz", as a music box, in a bossa nova rhythm, and in boogie-woogie.

=== Other versions ===
Frank Sinatra added the song to his repertoire in 1984 in an arrangement by Frank Foster; In the performance included on his album L.A. Is My Lady, Sinatra similarly name-checked Armstrong and Darin, as well as adding members of his backing band. Sinatra and Jimmy Buffett recorded a duet of the song for Sinatra's final album Duets II (1994).

Nick Cave and Spanish Fly performed the song for the video September Songs – The Music of Kurt Weill in 1994, released as an album in 1997. while Sting and Dominic Muldowney recorded it for the 1985 tribute album Lost in the Stars: The Music of Kurt Weill.

Other notable versions include performances by Lisa Stansfield, Mark Lanegan, Kenny Ball, Dave Van Ronk, Jimmie Dale Gilmore, Tony Bennett, Anita O'Day (in an arrangement by Jimmy Giuffre), Marianne Faithfull, Brian Setzer, Dr. John, Ute Lemper, King Kurt, Bing Crosby, Eartha Kitt, The Psychedelic Furs, David Cassidy (in At the Copa), Westlife, The Doors, Maria Farantouri, and Michael Bublé. Swiss band The Young Gods radically reworked the song in industrial style on their 1991 album The Young Gods Play Kurt Weill as "Mackie Messer", Deana Martin recorded "Mack the Knife" on her second studio album, Volare, released in 2009 by Big Fish Records. Robbie Williams recorded the song on his 2001 album Swing When You're Winning. Hildegard Knef recorded a German version, "Mackie Messer".

Salsa musician Rubén Blades recorded an homage entitled "Pedro Navaja" (Razor Pete). Brazilian composer Chico Buarque, in his loose adaptation of Threepenny Opera (Ópera do Malandro), made two versions called "O Malandro" and "O Malandro No. 2", with lyrics in Portuguese.

1950s comedic legend Ernie Kovacs used a German-translated version of the song throughout his television series.

== See also ==
- List of 1920s jazz standards
- List of UK singles chart number ones of the 1950s
- Pedro Navaja
- Mac Tonight, marketing figure for McDonald's in the late 1980s using this song
