= Mame (given name) =

Mame is a Senegalese given name. Notable people with the name include:

- Mame Biram Diouf (born 1987), Senegalese footballer
- Mame Madior Boye (born 1940), former Prime Minister of Senegal
- Mame Mor Ndiaye (born 1997), Senegalese footballer
- Mame Niang (born 1984), Senegalese footballer
- Mame Tacko Diouf (born 1976), Senegalese hurdler
- Mame Twumasi (born 1975), Canadian sprinter
- Mame Younousse Dieng, Senegalese writer

== See also ==
- Mame (disambiguation)
