= That's All (Bobby Darin album) =

Studio album by Bobby Darin
- Released: March 1959
- Recorded: 1958–1959
- Genre: Traditional pop, vocal jazz
- Length: 35:17
- Label: Atco
- Producer: Ahmet Ertegün, Nesuhi Ertegun, Jerry Wexler

Bobby Darin chronology
Bobby Darin (1958)	That's All (1959)	This Is Darin (1960)

Singles from That's All
- 1. "Mack the Knife" Released: Aug 1959; 2. "Beyond the Sea" Released: Jan 1960

That's All is the second album by American singer Bobby Darin, released in March 1959, and arranged by Richard Wess.

The album debuted on the Billboard Best Selling LPs chart in the issue dated October 5, 1959, and remained on the chart for 52 weeks, peaking at number seven. It also debuted on the Cashbox albums chart in the issue dated May 30, 1959, and remained on the chart for a total of 80 weeks, peaking at number ten. It entered the UK album chart on April 9, 1960, and spent its only week on the album chart there at number 15.

It also includes Darin's US No. 1 hit "Mack the Knife", which spent nine weeks at the top spot, and "Beyond the Sea", which was a Top 10 hit. At the second Grammy Awards (and the first to be televised), Darin won Record of the Year and Best New Singer.

The album was released on compact disc by Ais / Black Coffee Records on May 22, 2012 as tracks 13 through 24 on a pairing of two albums on one CD, with tracks 1 through 12 consisting of Darin's 1960 album, This Is Darin. That's All was included in a box set entitled Original Album Series, which contains five of his studio albums, and was released on March 1, 2010.

== Recording ==
The first of several successful collaborations between Bobby Darin and arranger/conductor Richard Wess, That's All launched the young singer from the realm of teen pop into the adult market, and comparisons with Frank Sinatra. Publicist Harriet “Hesh” Wasser persuaded Wess to work with the twenty-two-year-old. Darin recorded "Mack the Knife" on December 19, 1958, and Ahmet Ertegun, founder of Atlantic Records, knew they had caught lightning in a bottle, later recalling:

As we were cutting Mack the Knife on the first date, there was no doubt in anybody's mind it would be a success. Everyone knew that this was going to be a number one record. Then I realized that having done the rock thing, Bobby was now going to have a big pop hit. We knew as we were cutting it, he's going to become a major, major star. We were jumping up and down, and after the first take, I said, "You've got it! That's it."

Darin and Wess would team up again for This is Darin (1960), From Hello Dolly to Goodbye Charlie (1964), and Bobby Darin Sings the Shadow of Your Smile (1966).

== Reception ==
Professional ratings
Review scores
Source	Rating
AllMusic	4.5/5 stars
The Encyclopedia of Popular Music	3/5 stars
Disc	5/5 stars
The New Rolling Stone Album Guide	3.5/5 stars
MusicHound	4.5/5 stars

Billboard in its Spotlight of the Week album reviews stated that the album "it features a wide-ranging group of ballads, including a good sprinking tunes" Cashbox in its Popular Picks of The Week album reviews stated that "he is given a legit singing opportunity and he comesthrough in pro style." Variety described the album as "a revealing performance" Ken Graham of Disc described the album as a "superb album"

Music critic JT Griffith called That's All Darin's "most important record" in his AllMusic review, writing that it "broadened his appeal and secured his imortality [sic]... [It] might not be a new fan's first Darin purchase. However, it is an important release in the Rock and Roll Hall of Famer's career. This LP proves that not every rocker suffers the 'sophomore slump'." In an exploration of the evolution of "Mack the Knife", The Financial Times says:

Bobby Darin took the song by the scruff of the neck and turned it into the swing classic widely known today. Unlike the Brecht-Weill original, which remains in the same key throughout, Darin's version changes key, chromatically, no fewer than five times, ratcheting up the tension.

== Track listing ==
=== Side one ===
1. "Mack the Knife" (Bertolt Brecht, Kurt Weill) – 3:10
2. "Beyond the Sea" (Jack Lawrence, Charles Trenet) – 2:58
3. "Through a Long and Sleepless Night" (Mack Gordon, Alfred Newman) – 2:40
4. "Softly, as in a Morning Sunrise" (Oscar Hammerstein II, Sigmund Romberg) – 2:36
5. "She Needs Me" (Arthur Hamilton) – 3:32
6. "It Ain't Necessarily So" (George Gershwin, Ira Gershwin) – 3:26

=== Side two ===
1. "I'll Remember April" (Gene DePaul, Don Raye, Patricia Johnston) – 2:24
2. "That's the Way Love Is" (Bobby Darin) – 3:04
3. "Was There a Call for Me" (Woody Harris, Marty Holmes) – 3:11
4. "Some of These Days" (Shelton Brooks) – 2:44
5. "Where Is the One" (Eddie Finckel, Alec Wilder) – 3:30
6. "That's All" (Alan Brandt, Bob Haymes, Clyde Otis, Kelly Owens) – 2:02

== Charts ==
Chart (1959)	Peak position
US Billboard Top LPs	7
US Cash Box	10
UK Albums Chart	15

=== Singles ===
Year	Title	U.S. Hot 100	UK	U.S. Cashbox
1959	"Mack the Knife"	1	1	1
1960	"Beyond the Sea"	6	7	8

== Personnel ==
=== Musicians ===
- Richard Wess - arranger, conductor (of the Richard Wess Orchestra)
- Hank Jones - piano
- Barry Galbraith - guitar
- Eddie Safranski - bass
- Osie Johnson - drums (Mack the Knife)
- Don Lamond - drums
- Doc Severinsen - trumpet
- Joe Cabot - trumpet
- Al DeRisi - trumpet
- Frank Rehak - trombone
- Chauncey Welsch - trombone
- Jerry Sanfino - tuba
- Romeo Penque - flute, clarinet
- Joe Soldo - flute

=== Technical ===
- Recording Engineers: Tom Dowd, Carl Lustig, Herb Kaplan, Heinz Kubicka
- Cover photo: Tom Palumbo
- Cover design: Marvin Israel
- Supervision: Ahmet Ertegun, Nesuhi Ertegun, Jerry Wexler
