= Mame (film soundtrack) =

Original Soundtrack From The Motion Picture Mame

Soundtrack album by Various Artists
- Released: February 1974
- Recorded: 1973
- Genre: Soundtrack
- Length: 44:23
- Label: Warner Bros. W 2773
- Producer: Fred Werner

Original Soundtrack from the Motion Picture Mame is the soundtrack from the 1974 Warner Bros. movie adaptation of the Broadway musical Mame. The album features music and lyrics by Jerry Herman and retains all but one song, "That's How Young I Feel," from the original Broadway musical and adds a new song, "Loving You."

== Track listing ==
1. "Main Title Including St. Bridget" - Jane Connell & Orchestra
2. "It's Today" - Lucille Ball & Orchestra
3. "Open a New Window" - Lucille Ball & Kirby Furlong
4. "The Man in the Moon" - Beatrice Arthur & Chorus
5. "My Best Girl" - Lucille Ball & Kirby Furlong
6. "We Need a Little Christmas" - Lucille Ball, Jane Connell, George Chiang & Kirby Furlong
7. "Mame" - Robert Preston & Chorus
8. "Loving You" - Robert Preston
9. "The Letter" - Kirby Furlong & Bruce Davison
10. "Bosom Buddies" - Lucille Ball & Beatrice Arthur
11. "Gooch's Song" - Jane Connell
12. "If He Walked Into My Life" - Lucille Ball
13. "Finale (Open a New Window/Mame)" - Lucille Ball & Chorus

== Soundtrack releases ==
Mame's original soundtrack album was released on Warner Bros. Records in the spring of 1974, timed to the release of the film. The original Broadway cast recording with Angela Lansbury had sold over a million copies, and Warner Bros. The recording was unavailable for many years until Rhino Records released a limited edition Handmade CD edition in 2004. This edition was limited to 2,500 individually numbered copies, which quickly sold out. In 2005, Rhino licensed their digital master to Collector's Choice Music, a label devoted mainly to reissues of obscure titles. Both contain the same track listing and same versions as the original 1974 vinyl release. Due to Warner Bros.' inability to create an acceptable stereo soundtrack for the film's DVD release, this soundtrack album remains the only source for stereo versions of most of the songs.

=== Charts ===
Chart (1974)	Position
Australia (Kent Music Report)	62

== Differences between soundtrack and film performances ==
The soundtrack album, like many from its time, edits instrumental portions from songs, as well as leaving off several reprises and includes intros and outros specifically recorded for the soundtrack album. The album is missing instrumental portions of "Open A New Window" and the title track, as well as reprises of "It's Today," "We Need A Little Christmas," "Open A New Window," and "Bosom Buddies." "The Man In The Moon" also contains a longer ending and a reprise within the scene that don't appear on the soundtrack album. However, the soundtrack album version of "Bosom Buddies" is longer than the version that appears in the film. The lines "We'll always be dear companions/My cronie/My mate/We'll always be harmonizing/Orphan Annie and Sandy/Like Amos and Andy" were cut from the number in the film. The instrumental intro to "It's Today" is different from the intro in the film, and the instrumental intro to the finale is also completely different from the instrumental reprise of "My Best Girl" that precedes it in the film. In the "Loving You" song written for Robert Preston, a line on the soundtrack ("Loving you is Rome and New Orleans") is different from the line in the film.

== See also ==
- Auntie Mame (novel)
- Auntie Mame (film)
