= Once Upon a Time (Charles Strouse and Lee Adams song) =

Song
- Published: 1962
- Composer: Charles Strouse
- Lyricist: Lee Adams

"Once Upon a Time" is a song composed by Charles Strouse, with lyrics by Lee Adams, from the 1962 musical All American. It describes the joys of youthful love and laments the loss of love over time. In the musical, the song was performed by Ray Bolger and Eileen Herlie, and their version appears on the Broadway Cast recording.

It has been sung by Eddie Fisher in the album Eddie Fisher Today!, Bobby Darin in the album In a Broadway Bag (Mame), Frank Sinatra, in the album September of My Years, Perry Como in the album By Request, Tony Bennett in the album I Left My Heart in San Francisco, Bob Dylan in Triplicate and Andy Williams in The Great Songs from "My Fair Lady" and Other Broadway Hits among others.
