= List of Cash Box Top 100 number-one singles of 1959 =

These are the songs that reached number one on the Top 100 Best Sellers chart in 1959 as published by Cash Box magazine.

Key
†	Indicates best-performing single of 1959

Issue date	Song	Artist
January 3	The Chipmunk Song	Chipmunks with David Seville
January 10	The Chipmunk Song	Chipmunks with David Seville
January 17	Smoke Gets In Your Eyes	The Platters
January 24	Smoke Gets In Your Eyes	The Platters
January 31	Smoke Gets In Your Eyes	The Platters
February 7	Smoke Gets In Your Eyes	The Platters
February 14	Stagger Lee	Lloyd Price
February 21	Stagger Lee	Lloyd Price
February 28	Stagger Lee	Lloyd Price
March 7	Venus	Frankie Avalon
March 14	Venus	Frankie Avalon
March 21	Venus	Frankie Avalon
March 28	Venus	Frankie Avalon
April 4	Venus	Frankie Avalon
April 11	Come Softly To Me	The Fleetwoods
April 18	Come Softly To Me	The Fleetwoods
April 25	Come Softly To Me	The Fleetwoods
May 2	Come Softly To Me	The Fleetwoods
May 9	The Happy Organ	Dave "Baby" Cortez
May 16	The Happy Organ	Dave "Baby" Cortez
May 23	Kansas City	Wilbert Harrison
May 30	The Battle of New Orleans	Johnny Horton
June 6	The Battle of New Orleans	Johnny Horton
June 13	The Battle of New Orleans	Johnny Horton
June 20	The Battle of New Orleans	Johnny Horton
June 27	The Battle of New Orleans	Johnny Horton
July 4	The Battle of New Orleans	Johnny Horton
July 11	The Battle of New Orleans	Johnny Horton
July 18	The Battle of New Orleans	Johnny Horton
July 25	The Battle of New Orleans	Johnny Horton
August 1	Lonely Boy	Paul Anka
August 8	Lonely Boy	Paul Anka
August 15	There Goes My Baby	The Drifters
August 22	There Goes My Baby	The Drifters
August 29	The Three Bells	The Browns
September 5	The Three Bells	The Browns
September 12	The Three Bells	The Browns
September 19	The Three Bells	The Browns
September 26	Mack the Knife †	Bobby Darin
October 3	Mack the Knife †	Bobby Darin
October 10	Mack the Knife †	Bobby Darin
October 17	Mack the Knife †	Bobby Darin
October 24	Mack the Knife †	Bobby Darin
October 31	Mack the Knife †	Bobby Darin
November 7	Mack the Knife †	Bobby Darin
November 14	Mr. Blue	The Fleetwoods
November 21	Don't You Know?	Della Reese
November 28	Mr. Blue	The Fleetwoods
December 5	Don't You Know	Della Reese
December 12	Mack the Knife †	Bobby Darin
December 19	Heartaches By The Number	Guy Mitchell
December 26	Heartaches By The Number	Guy Mitchell

== See also ==
- 1959 in music
- List of Hot 100 number-one singles of 1959 (U.S.)
