= The Girl's Suite and The Perfume Suite =

1982 album by Duke Ellington

Compilation album by Duke Ellington
- Released: 1982
- Recorded: August 19–20, 1961, and December 9, 1957
- Studio: Columbia, Los Angeles and New York City
- Genre: Jazz
- Label: Columbia
- Producer: Irving Townsend/Teo Macero

Duke Ellington chronology
First Time! The Count Meets the Duke (1961)	The Girl's Suite and The Perfume Suite (1982)	All American in Jazz (1962)

The Girl's Suite and The Perfume Suite is an album by the American pianist, composer and bandleader Duke Ellington that compiles recordings from 1957 and 1961. It was released on the Columbia label in 1982.

Re The Perfume Suite, as per Stanley Dance in the original album notes, "Originally premiered at Carnegie Hall on 19 December 1944, this four-part work was a deliberate attempt to dazzle a seated audience. 'The premise behind it,' Ellington wrote in Music Is My Mistress, 'was what perfume does to or for the woman who is wearing it, and each part portrayed the mood a woman gets into – or would like to get into – when wearing a certain type of perfume.'"

== Reception ==
Professional ratings
Review scores
Source	Rating
AllMusic	2/5 stars

The AllMusic review by Scott Yanow stated, "Overall, this set is mostly comprised of lesser Ellington pieces, but it is certainly not without its interesting moments."

== Track listing ==
All compositions by Duke Ellington except where noted.

1. "Girls" – 2:41
2. "Mahalia" – 3:12
3. "Peg o' My Heart" (Fred Fisher, Alfred Bryan) – 2:59
4. "Sweet Adeline" (Harry Armstrong) – 2:49
5. "Juanita" – 3:18
6. "Sylvia" – 2:41
7. "Lena" – 2:13
8. "Dinah" (Harry Akst, Sam M. Lewis, Joe Young) – 2:33
9. "Clementine" (arranged Ellington) – 2:48
10. "Diane" (Ernö Rapée, Lew Pollack) – 2:37
11. "Under the Balcony" – 2:55
12. "Strange Feeling" – 3:53
13. "Dancers in Love" – 2:17
14. "Coloratura" – 2:50
- Recorded at Columbia 30th Street Studio, New York, on December 2, 1957 (tracks 11 & 14) and December 9, 1957 (tracks 12 & 13), and at Columbia Studio, Los Angeles, on September 19, 1961 (tracks 1–6) and September 20, 1961 (tracks 7–10)

== Personnel ==
- Duke Ellington – piano
- Cat Anderson, Shorty Baker (tracks 12 & 13), Willie Cook (tracks 1–11 & 14), Ed Mullens (tracks 1–10), Ray Nance, Clark Terry (tracks 11–14) – trumpet
- Lou Blackburn (tracks 1–10), Lawrence Brown (tracks 1–10), Quentin Jackson (tracks 11–14), Britt Woodman (tracks 11–14) – trombone
- John Sanders – valve trombone (tracks 11–14)
- Chuck Connors – bass trombone (tracks 1–10)
- Jimmy Hamilton – clarinet, tenor saxophone
- Johnny Hodges – alto saxophone
- Russell Procope – alto saxophone, clarinet
- Paul Gonsalves – tenor saxophone
- Harry Carney – baritone saxophone, clarinet, bass clarinet
- Aaron Bell (tracks 1–10), Jimmy Woode (tracks 1–14) – bass
- Sam Woodyard – drums
- Milton Grayson – vocals (track 12)
