= All American (musical) =

- Original Broadway Cast Recording
- Music: Charles Strouse
- Lyrics: Lee Adams
- Book: Mel Brooks
- Basis: Robert Lewis Taylor's novel Professor Fodorski
- Productions: 1962 Broadway

All American is a musical with a book by Mel Brooks, lyrics by Lee Adams, and music by Charles Strouse. Based on the Robert Lewis Taylor 1950 novel Professor Fodorski, it is set on the campus of the fictional Southern Baptist Institute of Technology: the worlds of science and sports collide when the principles of engineering are applied to football strategies, and football strategies are used to teach the principles of engineering. The techniques of a Hungarian immigrant, Professor Fodorski, prove to be successful, resulting in a winning team, and he finds himself the target of a Madison Avenue ad man who wants to exploit his new-found fame.

The Broadway production, in 1962, starred Ray Bolger. It drew mostly unfavorable reviews and ran for 80 performances, though the song "Once Upon a Time" became popular.

== Background ==
Adams and Strouse, following the success of Bye Bye Birdie (1960), and Brooks, then a relatively unknown television comedy writer with limited experience writing for the stage (he had written revue sketches and the book for the short-lived 1957 musical Shinbone Alley), created an old-fashioned musical reminiscent of such lighthearted fare as Good News. The show was beset with problems from the start. Brooks never completed the second act, leaving the task to Joshua Logan, a noted script doctor whose comedic sensibilities were incompatible with those of Brooks, and the difference in writing styles was obvious. Additionally, Logan's emerging bipolar disorder was beginning to affect his work. Once Ray Bolger agreed to play Fodorski, the script was tailored to showcase his talents, but turning the musical into a star vehicle for a performer who was no longer an audience favorite ultimately proved to be a mistake.

Theatre writer Ken Mandelbaum noted that Brooks used his experience working on the show as a basis for his 1968 movie The Producers, in which an out-of-luck producer intentionally mounts a musical flop.

== Synopsis ==
Act 1

A group of immigrants arrives via plane in New York ("Melt Us"). Among them is Professor Stanislaus Fodorski, who has accepted a position as professor of engineering at a small college. Taking a bus to the campus, he marvels at the panorama passing by ("What a Country!"). He is greeted by the school's dean, Elizabeth Hawkes-Bullock. Surprised that the dean is a woman, he is even more surprised to learn he will be boarding in a room in her house. An accomplished author, he confesses doubt about his teaching skills, and she admits the school may not be strong academically, but needs more teachers who think of their students as "Our Children". Two of those students are confined to their respective dorm rooms after Doctor Snoops, professor of comparative religion, catches Ed Bricker climbing the ivy to visit Susan Thompson's room ("Animal Attraction").

Fodorski's first engineering class does not go over well with any of the students except Ed, who has always been interested in bridges ("We Speak the Same Language"). The professor's fears about his teaching skills vanish when he watches his first football game, which he sees as an example of applied engineering ("I Can Teach Them!"). He starts incorporating football strategy into his lessons, and soon all his students are engaged and learning ("It's Fun to Think"). The admiration between the dean and the professor grows, and one evening, they reminisce about past romances ("Once Upon a Time"). Less happy is Susan, still confined to her dorm room and unable to join in the "Nightlife" fun on campus, but her mood changes when Ed appears on her balcony trellis. After a short visit, he climbs down the ivy, ecstatic about their growing affection for each other ("I've Just Seen Her"), and is almost caught again by Dr. Snoops, but Dean Hawkes-Booth's sudden arrival allows Ed to slip away unnoticed.

Fodorski visits the gym to give a pep talk to Ed and the rest of the football team ("Physical Fitness"). The team's spirits are high on the day of the game against the school's rivals ("The Fight Song"), but their performance on the field is terrible. Coach "Hulk" Stockworth is knocked out by a charging player from the other side, and the only one who can take over is Fodorski. Following his advice to think of his legs as a giant lever, Ed kicks a 98-yard field goal, winning the game.

Act 2

Professor Fodorski's sudden rise to fame has been noticed by Henderson, the owner of an advertising company called Exploiters Unlimited. Henderson plots to exploit the professor, make much money, then get him deported. Back on campus, the big hero at the Homecoming Ball is Ed "Bricker-the-Kicker", who accepts an award for his game-winning kick, claiming that "I Couldn't Have Done It Alone." Outside the ball, Fodorski proposes to the dean, who happily accepts ("If I Were You"). Suddenly, Henderson appears with a different kind of proposal, to form a Fodorski Foundation, and after a little persuasion, the professor agrees ("Have a Dream").

The football team has been winning game after game, and they are soon heading for the Cotton Bowl. As their successes continue, Fodorski's name is being used to endorse hundreds of products, and his face is on the cover of many magazines ("I'm Fascinating"). Ed Bricker's ego has also grown with each win, and he has given up interest in engineering in favor of professional football.

Ed has also lost interest in Susan, who pleads for help from the dean. Feeling ignored by Fodorski, the dean shows up in Ed's dormitory with martinis and dressed seductively, planning to get him disqualified from the football team ("The Real Me"). Dr. Snoops arrives with the school president, who fires the dean. Hearing the news, Fodorski is shocked, and realizes he needs to make things right ("Which Way?"). He benches Ed so the school will lose the Cotton Bowl, thwarting Ed's hopes for a football career, and ruining Henderson as the Fodorski Foundation collapses. The two pairs of lovers reconcile, and with the dream of a football championship gone, the students go back to their studies, and Fodorski receives a letter granting his application for citizenship ("Finale").

== Musical numbers ==
Act I

- Melt Us – Fodorski and Company
- What a Country! – Fodorski and Company
- Our Children – Fodorski and Hawkes-Bullock
- Animal Attraction – Susan and Ed
- Our Children (Reprise) – Fodorski and Hawkes-Bullock
- We Speak the Same Language – Fodorski and Ed
- I Can Teach Them! – Fodorski, Hawkes-Bullock, Ed
- It's Fun to Think – Fodorski and Company
- Once Upon a Time – Fodorski and Hawkes-Bullock
- Nightlife – Susan and Girls
- I've Just Seen Her – Ed
- Once Upon a Time (Reprise) – Hawkes-Bullock
- Physical Fitness – The Football Team
- The Fight Song – Fodorski and the Football Team
- What a Country! (Reprise) – Fodorski and Company

Act II

- I Couldn't Have Done It Alone – Ed and Susan
- If I Were You – Fodorski and Hawkes-Bullock
- Have a Dream – Fodorski and Henderson
- I've Just Seen Him – Susan
- I'm Fascinating – Fodorski
- Once Upon a Time (Reprise) – Hawkes-Bullock
- The Real Me – Hawkes-Bulock
- It's Up to Me – Fodorski
- The Fight Song (Reprise) – Fodorski and Company
- It's Fun to Think (Reprise) – The Company

== Productions ==
The Broadway production, directed by Logan and choreographed by Danny Daniels, opened on March 19, 1962, at the Winter Garden Theatre, where it ran for 80 performances. In addition to Bolger, the cast included Ron Husmann, Anita Gillette (Susan), Fritz Weaver, and Eileen Herlie. Bolger had not appeared on the stage in a decade, during which his appeal with audiences had declined. He tried to start a sing-along to "What a Country!" (which worked during "Once in Love with Amy" in the 1948 musical Where's Charley?, his biggest Broadway success), but audiences failed to join in.

== Reception ==
Reviews were mixed, though mostly unfavorable. Howard Taubman wrote in The New York Times that the main problem with the show "is that it's not sure whether it means to be sentimental, satirical or simply rowdy, and it ends by being dreary." Walter Kerr in the Herald Tribune said, "Mr. Bolger is never fascinating until he stands right up and tells you he is," and went on to praise Bolger's dance technique in the number "I'm Fascinating".

Logan and Bolger were each nominated for 1962 Tony Awards.

== Recordings ==
An original cast album was released by Columbia Masterworks Records. The songs "Animal Attraction", "I Can Teach Them!", "I've Just Seen Him", and several reprises were not included. A CD reissue released by Sony Broadway in 1992 contains a 42-page booklet of liner notes, including a plot synopsis.

In 1962, Duke Ellington and his Orchestra released All American in Jazz featuring big-band arrangements of the show's tunes.

In 2006, Harbinger Records released a CD entitled All American Live Backers Audition, a recording of a session for potential financial investors featuring Adams and Strouse performing their score, including songs cut prior to opening night, with Adams providing a running commentary between the numbers.

== Awards and nominations ==
=== Original Broadway production ===
Year	Award	Category	Nominee	Result
1962	Tony Award	Best Actor in a Musical	Ray Bolger	Nominated
1962	Tony Award	Best Direction of a Musical	Joshua Logan	Nominated
