= From Hello Dolly to Goodbye Charlie =

Studio album by Bobby Darin
- Released: November 1964
- Recorded: September 17–18, 1964, Hollywood, California
- Genre: Pop
- Length: 26:13
- Label: Capitol
- Producer: Jim Economides

Bobby Darin chronology
Winners (1964)	From Hello Dolly to Goodbye Charlie (1964)	Venice Blue (1965)

Singles from From Hello Dolly to Goodbye Charlie
- 1. "Hello, Dolly!" Released: January 25, 1965

From Hello Dolly to Goodbye Charlie is a studio album by American singer Bobby Darin, released in November 1964. The album was arranged and conducted by Richard Wess, who conducted Darin's earlier albums, That's All (1959), and This is Darin (1960).

The album contained some of the best standard-style recordings of Darin's career, including the title track "Hello, Dolly!", which debuted on the Billboard Hot 100 in the issue dated February 6, 1965, peaking at number 79 during its three-week stay. The song peaked at number 18 on the magazine's Easy Listening chart, during its three-weeks stay. and peaked at number 106 on the Cashbox singles chart during its seven-weeks stay. It also included popular movies songs, favorites such as "Sunday in New York", "Where Love Has Gone", "The Days of Wine and Roses".

The album debuted on the Billboard Top LPs chart in the issue dated December 26, 1964, and remained on the chart for eight weeks, peaking at number 107. It debuted on the Cashbox looking ahead albums chart in the issue dated January 16, 1965, and remained on the chart for a total of 11 weeks, peaking at number 115. On Record World's 100 Top LP's, the album peaked at No. 80.

The album was released on compact disc by EMI on December 11, 2001, paired with Darin's 1962 album Oh! Look at Me Now. It was released as one of two albums on one CD also by EMI in 2002, along with Darin's 1965 album, Venice Blue.

== Reception ==
Professional ratings
Review scores
Source	Rating
AllMusic	3/5 stars
Record Mirror	3/5 stars
The Encyclopedia of Popular Music	2/5 stars

In a review for AllMusic, music critic Richie Unterberger wrote, "It's got the competent verve you'd expect from Darin's mid-'60s pop'n'swing vocals, though not so exceptional that you'd recommend it as the cream of the crop. The highlight, if only because it doesn't sound like more of the same, is the dramatic, somber ballad "The End of Never," with its unexpected melodic arches and Darin's committed singing."

Billboard in its Pop Spotlight Album Pick reviews, notes that Darin "delivers a sensitive first-rate rendition of 'Days of Wine and Roses'."

Cashbox in its Pop Pick Reviews, stated that the album "features a vibrant and pulsating collection of theater, film and original tunes he dishes up with verve and polish."

Variety notes "Darin belts with considerable savvy neatly changing pace between the solid beat of "Call Me Irresponsible" and the slow torch attack on "Where Love Has Gone"

Record Mirror described the album as "his best album" noting that it features "mostly good songs with 'Look at Me', [and] 'Once in a Lifetime'."

Michael Seth Starr called it "a Big Band, brassy, show-tuney album". On the other hand, The Encyclopedia of Popular Music gave the album a two-star rating only, meaning that they believed that album was "flawed or lacking in some way."

== Track listing ==
=== Side one ===
1. "Hello, Dolly!" (Jerry Herman) – 3:14
2. "Call Me Irresponsible" (Jimmy Van Heusen, Sammy Cahn) – 2:04
3. "The Days of Wine and Roses" (Henry Mancini, Johnny Mercer) – 2:34
4. "More (Theme From "Mondo Cane")" (Norman Newell, Nino Oliviero, Riz Ortolani) – 2:25
5. "The End of Never" (Bobby Darin, Francine Forest) – 2:39
6. "Charade" (Mancini, Mercer) – 1:46

=== Side two ===
1. "Once in a Lifetime (Only Once)" (Leslie Bricusse, Anthony Newley) – 2:06
2. "Sunday in New York" (Peter Nero, Carroll Coates) – 2:30
3. "Where Love Has Gone" (Van Heusen, Cahn) – 2:43
4. "Look At Me" (Darin, Randy Newman) – 1:50
5. "Goodbye, Charlie" (André Previn, Dory Langdon) – 2:22

== Charts ==
Chart (1964)	Peak position
U.S. Top LPs (Billboard)	107
U.S. looking ahead (Cashbox)	115
U.S. 100 Top LP's (Record World)	80

=== Singles ===
Year	Title	U.S. Hot 100	U.S. Cashbox	US AC
1964	"Hello, Dolly!"	76	106	18

== Personnel ==
- Bobby Darin – vocals
- Lyle Ritz – bass guitar
- Eugene DiNovi, Lou Levy – piano
- Milt Norman – guitar
- Jack Sperling – drums
- Carlos Vidal – congas
- Nicholas Martinez – bongos
- Julius Wechter – percussion, timpani
- Bud Shank, Ronald Langinger, Plas Johnson, John Lowe, Bill Collette, Med Flory – saxophone
- Conrad Gozzo, Virgil Evans, Tony Terran, Jimmy Zito, Shorty Sherock, Pete Candoli, Bud Brisbois, Al Porcino – trumpet
- Dick Nash, James Henderson, Vernon Friley, Joe Howard, Milt Bernhart, Lew McCreary – trombone
- Armand Kaproff, Eleanor Slatkin, Edgar Lustgarten, Raphael Kramer – cello
- Jules Jacob, Ronald Langinger – flute
- Jules Jacob – oboe
- Joseph DiFiore, Alvin Dinkin, Harry Hymas, Alexander Nieman – viola
- Jacob Krachmalnick, Stanley Plummer, Myron Sandier, Marshall Sosson, Lou Raderman, Harry Bluestone, Marvin Limonick, Henry Roth, Elliott Fisher, Arnold Blenick, Paul Shure, Bernard Kundell, Darrel Terwilliger, Alvin Dinkin – violin
- Ann Stockton – harp
- Eddie Brackett – engineer
