= Mame (original Broadway cast recording) =

Cast recording by the original Broadway cast
- Released: June 3, 1966
- Label: Columbia Masterworks

Mame is an album containing a recording of the 1966 Broadway musical Mame made by its original cast, with Angela Lansbury in the title role. The album was released by Columbia Masterworks on June 3, 1966.

== Critical reception ==
Professional ratings
Review scores
Source	Rating
AllMusic	4/5 stars

In his retrospective review for AllMusic, William Ruhlmann called the original Broadway cast recording of Mame "a terrific cast album". The editors of AllMusic rated it four stars on a scale of five.

== Chart performance ==
The album reached number 23 on the Billboard's Top LPs chart.

== Track listing ==
LP – Columbia KOL 6600 (mono), KOS 3000 (stereo)

All lyrics are written by Jerry Herman; all music is composed by Jerry Herman.

Side 1
No.	Title	Artist(s)	Length
1.	"Overture"	Orchestra
2.	"St. Bridget"	Jane Connell, Frankie Michaels
3.	"It's Today"	Angela Lansbury and all
4.	"Open a New Window"	Angela Lansbury and all
5.	"The Man in the Moon"	Beatrice Arthur, Angela Lansbury and moon maidens
6.	"My Best Girl"	Frankie Michaels, Angela Lansbury
7.	"We Need a Little Christmas"	Angela Lansbury, Frankie Michaels, Jane Connell, Sab Shimono

Side 2
No.	Title	Artist(s)	Length
1.	"Mame"	Charles Braswell and all
2.	"The Letter"	Frankie Michaels, Jerry Lanning
3.	"Bosom Buddies"	Angela Lansbury, Beatrice Arthur
4.	"Gooch's Song"	Jane Connell
5.	"That's How Young I Feel"	Angela Lansbury and all
6.	"If He Walked into My Life"	Angela Lansbury
7.	"The Finale"	Angela Lansbury and all

== Charts ==
Chart (1966)	Peak position
US Billboard Top LPs	23

== Certifications ==
Region	Certification	Certified units/sales
United States (RIAA)	Gold	500,000^{^}
^{^} Shipments figures based on certification alone.

== Awards ==
Year	Award type	Categories	Results	Ref.
1967	Grammy Awards	Best Score from an Original Cast Show Album	Won	
