= Mame (song) =

1966 song from the musical "Mame", by Jerry Herman

Song by Charles Braswell and all

from the album Mame (original Broadway cast recording)
- Released: 1966
- Label: Columbia Masterworks
- Songwriter: Jerry Herman

"Mame" is a song written and composed by Jerry Herman, it premiered in 1966 in the Broadway musical Mame. In the musical and original Broadway cast recording, the song was sung by Beauregard and Company. The song has had many cover versions and was a hit for multiple artists, the first of which was Bobby Darin. The biggest version was released by Herb Alpert and the Tijuana Brass in late 1966; it hit the top 20 on the US pop charts and almost topped the adult-oriented charts.

== Bobby Darin version ==
"Mame"
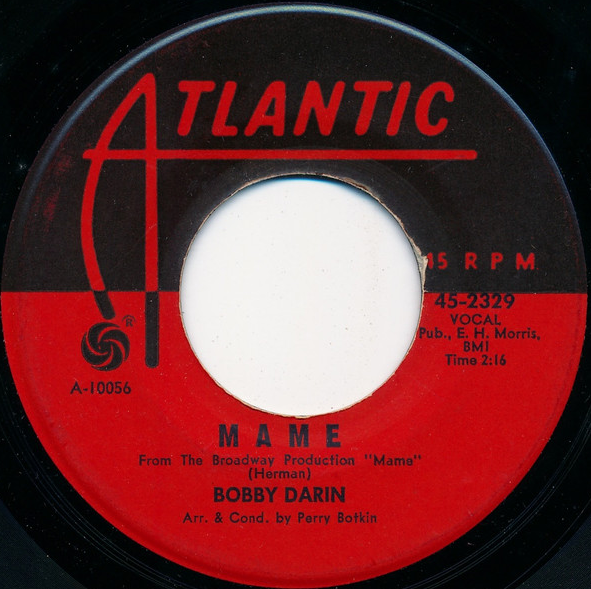

Single by Bobby Darin

from the album In a Broadway Bag (Mame)
- B-side: "Walking In The Shadow Of Love"
- Released: April 1966
- Genre: Traditional pop, vocal
- Length: 2:16
- Label: Atlantic; 45-2329
- Songwriter: Jerry Herman

Bobby Darin singles chronology
| "The Breaking Point" (1966) | "Mame" (1966) | "Merci Cherie" (1966) |

=== Release and reception ===
Bobby Darin released "Mame" as a seven-inch single in April 1966 by Atlantic Records. It was backed by slow-weeper song, "Walking In The Shadow Of Love" on the B-side, which didn't see an album inclusion. The advertisements for "Mame" noted that "Mame is the name, and Darin's got her".

The single got a positive reception upon its release. Cashbox reviewed the single in early April and stated "Money making Bobby Darin has come up with a delightful vocal cover of the Al Hirt instrumental, Mame The title tune from the forthcoming Broadway musical, this one is a happy." Noting, "Dixieland side with a wide ranged appeal." Record World said that "The Bobby Darin version of the title tune from "Mame" is a lively session and a hit it will turn out to be." Noting, "Charms the husk right off the corn".

=== Chart performance ===
The single debuted on Billboard magazine's Hot 100 chart in the issue dated April 30, 1966. It reached No. 53 on the Hot 100 during a seven-week run on the chart. It debuted on the Cashbox Top 100 Singles chart on the same date as it did on Billboard, but the single stalled at No. 63 during a shorter six-week run on it. "Mame" also peaked at No. 3 on the Billboard Easy Listening chart. The single also had success in Canada, quickly reaching No. 18 on the CHUM charts, although it was only ranked at No. 50 on the RPM Top Singles chart.

=== Aftermath ===
With this new success, in the same year he recorded an album with musical, Broadway and film songs songs, and it included the song "Mame", as it's seen in the title and cover of the album, "In a Broadway Bag (Mame)". It was his best charting song in almost 2 years, the last one being "Millord". Soon after he had an even bigger hit that year, via "If I Were a Carpenter", which reached the top 10.

== Notable cover versions ==
"Mame"

Single by Herb Alpert & the Tijuana Brass

from the album S.R.O.
- B-side: "Our Day Will Come"
- Released: November 1966
- Genre: Instrumental, Traditional Pop
- Length: 2:07
- Label: A&M; 823
- Composer: Jerry Herman

Herb Alpert & the Tijuana Brass singles chronology
| "Flamingo" (1966) | "Mame" (1966) | "Wade in the Water" (1967) |

=== Louis Armstrong version ===
- Another successful cover version of the song Mame is Louis Armstrong's cover from May 1966. It reached No. 81 on the Billboard Hot 100 and No. 7 on the Easy Listening chart. On Cashbox it peaked at No. 60 and stayed on the chart for 5 weeks.

=== Herb Alpert and the Tijuana Brass' version ===
- The most successful cover version is a version by Herb Alpert and the Tijuana Brass. Released as a single it reached No. 19 on the Hot 100 in November 1966 and No. 2 on the Easy Listening chart, In Cashbox it reached a peak position of No. 17, staying on the chart for 10 weeks, with it also debuting at No. 27 on Record World's newly created Top Non-Rock chart, staying there for a week before dropping out by February 18th of 1967. It also peaked at No. 51 in Australia. it was included in their 1966 hit album, S.R.O along with the single's B-side, "Our Day Will Come".

=== Frankie Vaughan version ===
- Frankie Vaughan had a minor comeback with the song "There Must Be a Way" in 1967, with that he recorded more charting UK singles. In 1968 he recorded "Mame" (a longer version), paired with "If I Had My Way", but the single didn't chart.

=== Other versions ===
- The first live performance was on March 27, 1966, by Charles Braswell and All.
- Jimmy Durante's version appears on his 1966 album One of Those Songs, arranged and conducted by Ernie Freeman.
- Eddie Fisher's cover arranged by Richard Wess appears on his album People Like You and was included as the B-side of his hit song "Games That Lovers Play". Cashbox magazine called the song "Another swingin’ date".

== Charts ==
=== Bobby Darin's version ===
| Chart (1966) | Peak position |
|---|---|
| US Billboard Hot 100 | 53 |
| US Billboard Easy Listening | 3 |
| US Cashbox Top 100 Singles | 63 |
| CAN CHUM Top Singles | 18 |
| CAN RPM Singles Survey | 50 |

=== Louis Armstrong's version ===
| Chart (1966) | Peak position |
|---|---|
| US Billboard Hot 100 | 81 |
| US Billboard Easy Listening | 7 |
| US Cashbox Top 100 Singles | 60 |

=== Herb Alpert's version ===
| Chart (1966-1967) | Peak position |
|---|---|
| US Billboard Hot 100 | 19 |
| US Billboard Easy Listening | 2 |
| US Cashbox Top 100 Singles | 17 |
| US Record World Top Non-Rock | 27 |
| AUS Top Singles | 51 |
