= Mayme Kratz =

American fine artist and desert forester

Mayme Kratz (born 1958) is a fine artist and desert forager known for her sculptural and two-dimensional mixed-media polymer resin works that encapsulate and preserve organic materials, in the artist's words, “giving value to things that are normally ignored…overlooked, stepped on, swept up as debris and thrown away”.

The investigative artist gathers materials on hiking and camping trips throughout the southwest. She then layers them with colored resin, transforming these humble materials into lyrical compositions that can suggest astronomical photographs or fine linear drawings. “The sensation is that of a suspended moment in a fragile ecosystem”.

== Background ==
Krantz was born in San Diego County, California and has lived and worked in Phoenix since 1986. Self-educated and focused on her creative life at an early age, she apprenticed with artist James Hubbell in her early twenties. She wrote:

"I live in the center of a city, in the middle of a desert surrounded on all sides by the enormity of the horizon. The environment is harsh. Everything is exposed. Nothing is hidden. I walk and forage in the dusty, hot landscape collecting seeds, bones and other odd bits that most might overlook. My walks reveal fragile ecosystems, strange beauty – insights in detritus. What I see in these intimate viewings finds its way into my dreams. Dreams lead to poems. Poems lead me to what I create. I hope to bring a focus, a new way of seeing, a new life to the objects I find. My collected specimens - ephemera preserved, protected - celebrate the endless cycles of change and rebirth in nature."

Kratz’ pieces have been shown in the Tucson Museum of Art, the Tacoma Museum of Glass, and the Phoenix Art Museum. In 2002, Kratz was part of an exhibit of works commissioned by the Scottsdale Museum of Contemporary Art entitled “Quartet: Kate Breakey, Mayme Kratz, Kyung-Lim Lee, and Marie Navarre”, named one of the top local Phoenix art exhibits of the decade. Her work is part of numerous collections, including the permanent collection of the Scottsdale Museum of Contemporary Art, the Phoenix Art Museum, and the Bechtler Arts Foundation in Charlotte, NC.

Other notable Public Collections and Commissions include the following:

America West Airlines (Tempe AZ), Bank USA (Phoenix AZ), Bank of America (Phoenix, AZ) Bechtler Arts Foundation (Charlotte NC), Biltmore Bank (Phoenix AZ), City of Chandler (Chandler Arts Commission AZ), City of Glendale (Glendale Arts Commission AZ), City of Phoenix (An Open Book, Phoenix Arts Commission AZ), City of Scottsdale (Public Arts Commission, AZ), City of Tempe, (trueNorth, Public Arts Commission, Tempe Performing Arts Center (Tempe AZ), First Western Bank (Scottsdale AZ), McDonald's Corporation (Phoenix AZ), MGM Grand City Center (Aria Resort, Las Vegas, NV), Nordstrom (Kansas City KS), Phoenix Newspapers, Inc. (Phoenix AZ), San Jose Museum of Art (San Jose CA).

Kratz was a visiting artist at Pilchuck Glass School in Stanwood Washington, and was also awarded a residency at The Museum of Glass in Tacoma Washington. Her work is in many private and public collections throughout the United States. She is represented by and exhibits regularly at Lisa Sette Gallery (Phoenix AZ), Dolby Chadwick Gallery (California) and Littlejohn Contemporary (New York City).

In January 2003, David Whyte and Kratz gave a joint presentation in conjunction with the exhibition The Visual Poetry of Mayme Kratz and Kratzs hot shop residency at the Museum of Glass in Tacoma. Kratz received a Contemporary Forum mid-career award and exhibition at the Phoenix Art Museum in 2011. Also in 2011, Kratz was featured in the UCROSS FOUNDATION art gallery's In the Presence of Trees.

In 2012, Kratz was chosen for the Cassilhaus Artist Retreat and Residency in North Carolina. While there she created gathered materials from the adjacent Duke Forest, created new works and gave an artist talk on her process. During her stay, a small exhibition of works from Kratz's Dark Matter series, created in collaboration with photographer Tim Lanterman, was on display.

In 2013 Gnosis Ltd. produced a documentary titled Stand Still - focusing on Kratz and her creative process. The documentary, by director/producer Suzanne Johnson of Gnosis Ltd., offers a glimpse into the creative process that connects us all. It was screened the Scottsdale Museum of Contemporary Art along with the short film "Tumbleweed Bower-Mayme Kratz" from filmmaker Helen Raleigh. The film focuses on the construction of Tumbleweed Bower, a 15-foot high cube of tumbleweeds, which exhibited for 10 days at the Icehouse art space in 2011.

Kratz's studio and several works have been featured in Dwell magazine. In 2016, Kratz's work was included in the San Jose Museum of Art's exhibition "Indestructible Wonder". Kratz, alongside Diana Thater, Evan Holm, Ruth Asawa, Richard Misrach, Kristen Stolle, Anne Appleby, and others explored the precarious nature between nature and humanity. Kratz was included in the 2016 exhibition Lightning Strikes: 18 poets.18 artists at Dolby Chadwick Gallery.
