= Lee Adams =

American lyricist (born 1924)

- Born: Leopold Richard Adams; August 14, 1924 (age 102); Mansfield, Ohio, U.S.
- Education: Ohio State University; Columbia University
- Occupations: Writer, librettist
- Spouse: Kelly Wood Adams
- Children: 2
- Writing career
- Notable works: Bye Bye Birdie; Golden Boy; It's a Bird... It's a Plane... It's Superman; Applause
- Notable awards: 2 Tony Awards, 1 Emmy Award

Lee Richard Adams (born Leopold Richard Adams, August 14, 1924) is an American lyricist best known for his musical theatre collaboration with Charles Strouse.

== Biography ==
Lee Adams was born in Mansfield, Ohio, on August 14, 1924. He is the son of Dr. Leopold Adams, originally of Stamford, Connecticut, and Florence Ellis (originally Elishack) Adams, originally of Racine, Wisconsin. His family is Jewish. He is a graduate of Mansfield Senior High School. He received his Bachelor of Arts degree in journalism from Ohio State University and a Master's from Columbia University school of journalism. While attending Ohio State, he was a brother of the Nu chapter of the Zeta Beta Tau fraternity. He worked as a journalist for newspaper and magazines. He met Charles Strouse in 1949, and they initially wrote for summer-time revues.

Adams won Tony Awards in 1961 for Bye Bye Birdie, the first Broadway musical he wrote with Strouse, and in 1970 for Applause and was nominated for a Tony Award in 1965 for Golden Boy. In addition, he wrote the lyrics for All American, It's a Bird...It's a Plane...It's Superman, Bring Back Birdie, and A Broadway Musical, and the book and lyrics for Ain't Broadway Grand. Additionally, Strouse and Adams co-wrote "Those Were the Days", the opening theme to the TV situation comedy All in the Family. Adams was inducted into the Songwriters Hall of Fame in 1989.

Adams has been married to his wife, Dr. Kelly Wood Adams, since September 1980. They have lived in Briarcliff Manor, New York since 2007. He has two daughters and three grandchildren. He turned 100 in August 2024.

== Nonmusical writing ==
In addition to his work with lyrics, Adams "had a lifelong fascination with words," which led to his being an editor for the Sunday newspaper magazine supplement This Week and a member of the staff of Pageant magazine.

== Works ==
- A Pound in Your Pocket (1958)
- Bye Bye Birdie (1960)
- All American (1962)
- Golden Boy (1964)
- It's a Bird...It's a Plane...It's Superman (1966)
- Applause (1970)
- I and Albert (1972)
- Bring Back Birdie (1980)
- A Broadway Musical (1982), contributed the song Dancing
- Ain't Broadway Grand! (1993)

== See also ==
- List of centenarians (musicians, composers and music patrons)

== Sources ==
- Contemporary Authors Online, Detroit: Gale, 2001, ISBN 978-0-7876-3995-2
