= 1963 in music =

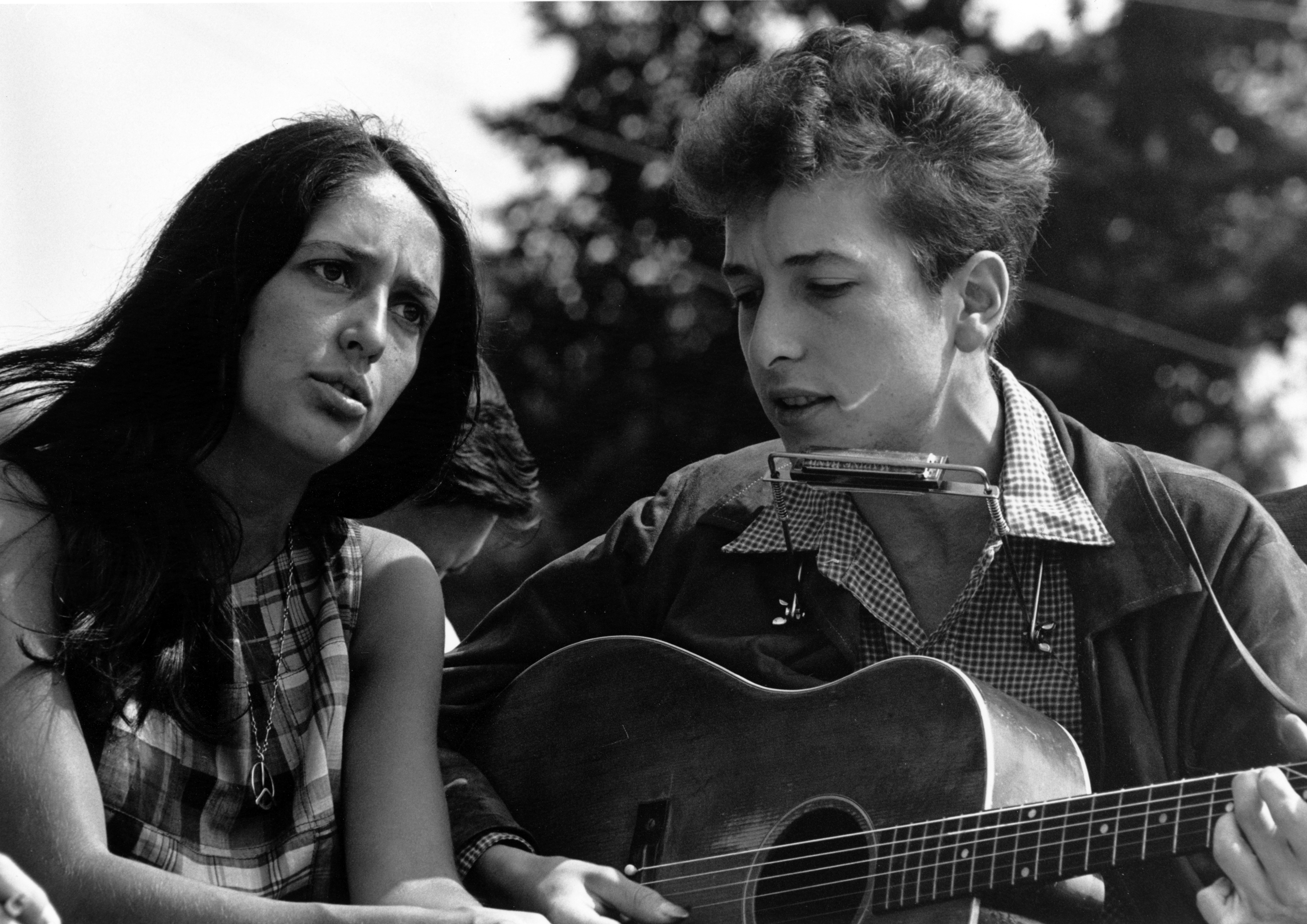
Joan Baez and Bob Dylan perform at 1963's March on Washington for Jobs and Freedom

This is a list of notable events in music that took place in the year 1963.

== Specific locations ==
- 1963 in British music
- 1963 in Japanese music
- 1963 in Norwegian music

== Specific genres ==
- 1963 in country music
- 1963 in jazz

== Events ==
- January 3 – The Beatles begin their first tour of 1963 with a five-day tour in Scotland to support the release of their new single, "Love Me Do", beginning with a performance in Elgin.
- January 4 – At Cortina d'Ampezzo in Italy, Dalida receives a Juke Box Global Oscar for the year's most-played artist on jukeboxes.
- January 7 – Gary U.S. Bonds files a $100,000 lawsuit against Chubby Checker, claiming that Checker stole "Quarter to Three" and turned it into "Dancin' Party." The lawsuit is later settled out of court.
- January 11 – "Please Please Me" is released in the United Kingdom by the Beatles, with "Ask Me Why" as the B-side.
- January 12 – Bob Dylan portrays a folk singer in The Madhouse of Castle Street, a radio play for the BBC in London.
- February 9 – Europa Cantat - European Federation of Young Choirs is founded after the first edition of the eponymous Europa Cantat festival in 1961.
- February 16
  - The Beatles achieve their first No. 1 hit single, when "Please Please Me" tops the charts in the UK.
  - Paul Anka marries Marie-Ann DeZogheb.
- February 22 – The Beatles form Northern Songs Publishing Company.
- March 5 – 1963 Camden PA-24 crash: Patsy Cline is killed in small plane crash near Camden, Tennessee, while on her way to Nashville, Tennessee, from Kansas City, Missouri, at the height of her career, together with Cowboy Copas and Hawkshaw Hawkins.
- March 22 – The Beatles release their first album, Please Please Me, in the UK.
- March 23 – The 8th Eurovision Song Contest is held in two studios at the BBC Television Centre, London. After much confusion regarding the results of the Norwegian jury, Denmark snatches victory from Switzerland after a close run. The Danish husband-and-wife duo Grethe and Jørgen Ingmann take the prize with "Dansevise".
- April 29 – 19-year-old Andrew Loog Oldham signs a contract with the Rolling Stones, becoming their manager. Oldham had seen the band in concert the previous day at the Crawdaddy Club in London.
- May 2 – The Beatles reach number one in the UK singles chart for the second time with "From Me To You".
- May 11 – The Beatles album Please Please Me goes to the top of the UK Albums Chart.
- May 15
  - Opening of the National Academic Theatre of Opera and Ballet of Mongolia.
  - The 5th Annual Grammy Awards are held in Chicago, Los Angeles and New York, hosted by Frank Sinatra. Tony Bennett and Igor Stravinsky each win the most awards with three, with the former winning Record of the Year for his song "I Left My Heart in San Francisco". Vaughn Meader's The First Family wins Album of the Year and Anthony Newley and Leslie Bricusse's "What Kind of Fool Am I?" wins Song of the Year. Robert Goulet wins Best New Artist.
- May 27 – The Freewheelin' Bob Dylan, singer-songwriter Bob Dylan's second and most influential studio album, is released by Columbia Records. The lead song, "Blowin' in the Wind", is released as a single by Peter, Paul and Mary in June and by Dylan himself in August.
- May 29 – On the 50th anniversary of its stormy première, 88-year-old Pierre Monteux conducts the London Symphony Orchestra in The Rite of Spring at the Royal Albert Hall, with the composer Stravinsky (81) in the audience.
- June 7 – The Rolling Stones' first single, a cover version of the Chuck Berry song "Come On", is released in the UK and reaches No. 21.
- August 3 – The Beatles perform at The Cavern Club in Liverpool for the final time.
- August 28 – March on Washington for Jobs and Freedom. Musical performers include Mahalia Jackson, Bob Dylan, Joan Baez, Peter, Paul and Mary and Marian Anderson.
- August 30 – Philips introduces the Musicassette at the Berlin Funkaustellung.
- September 6 – Nippon Crown record label is established as Crown Records, a subsidiary of Columbia Music Entertainment.
- September 12 – The Beatles reach the UK number one for the third time with the single "She Loves You" (released on 23 August).
- October 13 – Lesley Gore performs on The Ed Sullivan Show for the first time. She performs a medley of her smash hits "It's My Party" and "She's a Fool," which charted at #1 and #5, respectively.
- October 15
  - British newspaper The Daily Mirror uses the term "Beatlemania" in a news story about the group's concert the previous day in Cheltenham; a Scottish music promoter later claims to have originated the term a week earlier.
  - Berliner Philharmonie concert hall opens.
- November 30 – After an unbroken 30-week spell at the top of the UK Albums Chart, The Beatles album Please Please Me is knocked off the top of the charts by the group's latest album With the Beatles (released on 22 November).
- December 12 – The Beatles reach number one in the UK for the fourth time with "I Want To Hold Your Hand" (released on 29 November).
- date unknown
  - Dalida is rejected by Decca in the UK again.
  - Don Buchla begins to design an electronic music synthesizer in Berkeley, California.
  - Coxsone Dodd opens the first black-owned recording studio in Jamaica, named Studio One.
  - Lord Shorty's "Cloak and Dagger" is widely considered the first soca recording.
  - I Nyoman Rembang leaves the Surakarta Conservatorium to teach at the College of Music SMKI in Bali.

== Bands formed ==
- Aeolian Singers
- All-Ohio State Fair Youth Choir
- Ambassadors of Harmony
- Anaheim Kingsmen Drum and Bugle Corps
- The Angels (American group)
- The Artwoods
- Baby Huey & the Babysitters
- The Back Porch Majority
- The Bats (South African band)
- Billy Thorpe & the Aztecs
- Bloomington Symphony Orchestra (Minnesota)
- Bobby Taylor & the Vancouvers
- Bombay Sisters
- The Brothers-in-Law
- Bryn Mawr Mainliners
- Butch Engle & the Styx
- Camerata Bern
- Carlton Showband
- Chicago Brass Quintet
- The Clefs
- Crni Biseri
- The Cryin' Shames
- Daltoni
- David and the Giants
- The Deakins
- Downliners Sect
- Edmonton Strutters Drum and Bugle Corps
- The Escorts (Liverpool band)
- Exile (American band)
- Fairies (British band)
- The Flames
- The Fortunes
- The Fourmost
- Inez and Charlie Foxx
- Framus Five
- Franz Liszt Chamber Orchestra
- Freddie and the Dreamers
- The Fugs
- The Gants
- The Geezinslaw Brothers
- The Gentrys
- Gilbert and Sullivan for All
- Hedgehoppers Anonymous
- Hep Stars
- The Hideaways
- Hiroshima Symphony Orchestra
- The Honeycombs
- Irish Chamber Orchestra
- The Irish Rovers
- The Kinks
- Kyiv Chamber Orchestra
- The Leaves
- The Liverbirds
- Livermore-Amador Symphony
- Liverpool Five
- Mandarins Drum and Bugle Corps
- Manfred Mann
- Marek i Wacek
- The Marionettes Chorale
- Bob Marley and the Wailers
- The Master Singers
- The Mindbenders
- The Moments (English band)
- Johnny and Jonie Mosby
- Mountain City Four
- Neighb'rhood Childr'n
- New Birth (band)
- New York Youth Symphony
- Orchestra Ethiopia
- The Outcasts (Texas band)
- Piccolo Coro dell'Antoniano
- The Poets
- The Pretty Things
- The Pussycats
- The Rockin' Vickers
- The Rokes
- Samonikli
- The Scorpions (Manchester band)
- Sfinx
- The Shanes
- The Shangri-Las
- Slam Creepers
- The Sorrows
- South Carolina Philharmonic
- The Spencer Davis Group
- The Squires
- Stanford Band
- Stanford Mendicants
- The Syndicats
- Tages
- Teddy and The Pandas
- The Three Degrees
- TPAO Batman
- Trendsetters Limited
- Tulsa Youth Symphony
- Unbelievable Uglies
- Unit 4 + 2
- University of the Philippines Madrigal Singers
- The V.I.P.'s
- Valley Concert Chorale
- Velvet Knights Drum and Bugle Corps
- The Wilde Flowers
- The Wolfe Tones
- The Yardbirds

== Bands disbanded ==
- The Springfields

== Albums released ==
Albums released in January 1963
Day	Album	Artist	Notes
1	Peace in the Valley	Jo Stafford and Gordon MacRae	
7	Blood, Sweat and Tears	Johnny Cash	
14	Dean "Tex" Martin: Country Style	Dean Martin	
15	Moving	Peter, Paul and Mary	
18	Summer Holiday	Cliff Richard and The Shadows	Soundtrack
	Do the Bossa Nova	Herbie Mann with Baden Powell and Antonio Carlos Jobim	
	Duke Ellington & John Coltrane	Duke Ellington and John Coltrane	
	Duke Ellington Meets Coleman Hawkins	Duke Ellington and Coleman Hawkins	
	Let's Go! With The Routers	The Routers	
	My Baby Loves to Swing	Vic Damone	
	My Son, the Celebrity	Allan Sherman	
	Our Man Down South	Eddy Arnold	
	Patti Page on Stage	Patti Page	Live
	This Is My Story	Dinah Washington	
	The Ventures Play Telstar and the Lonely Bull	The Ventures	
	Walk Right In	The Rooftop Singers	Featuring hit title track
	Winners	Steve Lawrence	

Albums released in February 1963
Day	Album	Artist	Notes
11	Annie Get Your Gun	Doris Day and Robert Goulet	Soundtrack
18	All Alone Am I	Brenda Lee	
18	I Wanna Be Around...	Tony Bennett	
20	How the West Was Won	Various Artists	Soundtrack to 1962 film
25	The Barbra Streisand Album	Barbra Streisand	
27	Follow the Boys	Connie Francis	
28	The Fabulous Miracles	The Miracles	
	Back to the Blues	Dinah Washington	
	Best Sellers by Rick Nelson	Rick Nelson	Compilation
	Big Girls Don't Cry and Twelve Others	The Four Seasons	
	Caravan	Art Blakey	
	Pat Boone Sings Days of Wine and Roses	Pat Boone	
	Don't Play Me Cheap	Ike & Tina Turner	
	The Happy Beat	Ray Conniff	
	He's a Rebel	The Crystals	
	Jimmie Rodgers in Folk Concert	Jimmie Rodgers	
	Just Turn Me Loose!	George Maharis	
	Mr. Soul	Sam Cooke	
	People Will Say We're In Love	Steve Lawrence	
	The Night Has a Thousand Eyes	Bobby Vee	

Albums released in March 1963
Day	Album	Artist	Notes
20	I Could Go On Singing	Judy Garland	Soundtrack
22	Please Please Me	The Beatles	Debut
25	Surfin' U.S.A.	The Beach Boys	
	Broadway – My Way	Nancy Wilson	
	College Standards	The Lettermen	
	Gene Pitney Sings Just for You	Gene Pitney	
	The Kingston Trio No. 16	The Kingston Trio	
	Ruby Baby	Dion	
	Skeeter Davis Sings The End of the World	Skeeter Davis	

Albums released in April 1963
Day	Album	Artist	Notes
10	It Happened at the World's Fair	Elvis Presley	Soundtrack
22–24	Dean (Tex) Martin Rides Again	Dean Martin	
	Presenting Dionne Warwick	Dionne Warwick	
	Affinity	Oscar Peterson Trio	
	Afro-Bossa	Duke Ellington	
	Baby Workout	Jackie Wilson	
	Boots Randolph's Yakety Sax	Boots Randolph	featuring hit title track
	Dion Sings to Sandy (and all his other gals)	Dion	
	Hobo Flats	Jimmy Smith	
	Living It Up!	Bert Kaempfert	
	Meets the Ventures	Bobby Vee	
	Surfing	The Ventures	
	Jazz Samba Encore!	Stan Getz & Luiz Bonfá	
	Days of Wine and Roses and Other TV Requests	Andy Williams	Charted at #1 in the US Billboard.

Albums released in May 1963
Day	Album	Artist	Notes
21	Cleopatra Feelin' Jazzy	Paul Gonsalves	
21	Recorded Live: The 12 Year Old Genius	Little Stevie Wonder	Live
27	The Freewheelin' Bob Dylan	Bob Dylan	
27	For Your Sweet Love	Ricky Nelson	
31	The Miracles Recorded Live on Stage	The Miracles	Live
	Dynamite	Ike & Tina Turner	
	The End of the World	Julie London	
	Jan & Dean Take Linda Surfing	Jan and Dean	
	Hats Off to Del Shannon	Del Shannon	UK Release
	Live at the Apollo	James Brown	Live
	Long Long Ago	Tennessee Ernie Ford	
	Sound of Mann	Herbie Mann	
	The Ventures Play the Country Classics	The Ventures	
	Where Did Everyone Go?	Nat King Cole	

Albums released in June 1963
Day	Album	Artist	Notes
1	Bobby Vee Meets the Ventures	Bobby Vee & The Ventures	Duet
7	Blues, Rags and Hollers	Koerner, Ray & Glover	
10	The Patsy Cline Story	Patsy Cline	Compilation
17	Still	Bill Anderson	
28	Come and Get These Memories	Martha and the Vandellas	
	Blue & Sentimental	Ike Quebec	
	Cliff's Hit Album	Cliff Richard	Compilation
	Everybody's Favorite	Jimmy Dean	
	I'll Cry if I Want To	Lesley Gore	
	It's Gonna Work Out Fine	Ike & Tina Turner	
	It's You or No One	Bobby Darin	
	King of the Surf Guitar	Dick Dale	
	Little Town Flirt	Del Shannon	
	Quincy Jones Plays Hip Hits	Quincy Jones	
	The Star Spangled Banner	Pat Boone	
	Uniquely Mancini	Henry Mancini	

Albums released in July 1963
Day	Album	Artist	Notes
15	Seven Steps to Heaven	Miles Davis	
	18 Yellow Roses	Bobby Darin	
	The Black Saint and the Sinner Lady	Charles Mingus	-
	Cannonball's Bossa Nova	Cannonball Adderley	
	Earthy!	Bobby Darin	
	Faithfully Yours	Eddy Arnold	
	Greatest American Waltzes	Connie Francis	
	In Dreams	Roy Orbison	
	Ingredients in a Recipe for Soul	Ray Charles	
	So Much in Love	The Tymes	Debut
	Sunny Side!	The Kingston Trio	
	Wipe Out	The Surfaris	

Albums released in August 1963
Day	Album	Artist	Notes
6	Ring of Fire: The Best of Johnny Cash	Johnny Cash	Compilation
12	Elvis' Golden Records Volume 3	Elvis Presley	Compilation
12	Laughing on the Outside	Aretha Franklin	
	Blue on Blue	Bobby Vinton	re-titled Blue Velvet
	Cattle Call	Eddy Arnold	
	Chuck Berry on Stage	Chuck Berry	Live
	"Detroit City" and Other Hits by Bobby Bare	Bobby Bare	Compilation
	Let's Go!	The Ventures	
	The Lettermen in Concert	The Lettermen	Live
	"Mala Femmena" and Connie's Big Hits for Italy	Connie Francis	
	Night Beat	Sam Cooke	
	Prisoner of Love	James Brown	
	The Second Barbra Streisand Album	Barbra Streisand	
	Trini Lopez At PJ's	Trini Lopez	

Albums released in September 1963
Day	Album	Artist	Notes
9	Marvin Gaye Recorded Live on Stage	Marvin Gaye	Live
12	..."Let Me Sing"	Brenda Lee	
16	Surfer Girl	The Beach Boys	
30	Heat Wave	Martha and the Vandellas	
	The Best of Jean Shepard	Jean Shepard	
	Dinah '63	Dinah Washington	
	Ella and Basie!	Ella Fitzgerald	
	Painted, Tainted Rose	Al Martino	
	When in Spain	Cliff Richard	

Albums released in October 1963
Day	Album	Artist	Notes
4	Sounds of Christmas	Johnny Mathis	Christmas
7	Little Deuce Coupe	The Beach Boys	
14	The Andy Williams Christmas Album	Andy Williams	Christmas
	Blue Gene	Gene Pitney	
	Cloudy with Occasional Tears	Skeeter Davis	
	Deep Purple	Nino Tempo & April Stevens	
	How Do You Like It?	Gerry & the Pacemakers	UK
	In the Wind	Peter, Paul & Mary	
	Live at Newport	Herbie Mann	Live
	The Wonderful World of Julie London	Julie London	

Albums released in November 1963
Day	Album	Artist	Notes
11	The Miracles Doin' Mickey's Monkey	The Miracles	
15	Fun in Acapulco	Elvis Presley	Soundtrack
18	Romantically	Johnny Mathis	
22	A Christmas Gift for You from Phil Spector	Phil Spector	Christmas
22	With the Beatles	The Beatles	
	The Christmas Spirit	Johnny Cash	Christmas
	Golden Folk Hits	Bobby Darin	
	Joan Baez in Concert, Part 2	Joan Baez	Live
	Lesley Gore Sings Songs of Mixed-Up Hearts	Lesley Gore	
	The Story of Christmas	Tennessee Ernie Ford	Christmas

Albums released in December 1963
Day	Album	Artist	Notes
9	Rick Nelson Sings "For You"	Rick Nelson	
16	Love Him	Doris Day	
16	Quiet Nights	Miles Davis	
	I Remember Buddy Holly	Bobby Vee	
	In Person	The Kingsmen	
	In the Summer of His Years	Connie Francis	
	Time to Think	The Kingston Trio	
	Volume 2	Herb Alpert & the Tijuana Brass	
	Wives and Lovers	Jack Jones	
	With a Song in My Heart	Stevie Wonder	

=== Release date unknown ===
- All Alone – Jo Stafford
- Any Number Can Win – Jimmy Smith
- Baby, Baby, Baby – Jimmy Witherspoon
- Bill Henderson with the Oscar Peterson Trio – Bill Henderson
- Broadway, I Love You – Sergio Franchi
- Bye Bye Birdie – Bobby Rydell
- (By Popular Demand) More Trini Lopez at PJ's – Trini Lopez
- Catch a Rising Star – John Gary (debut)
- Checkered Flag – Dick Dale
- Christmas with The Chipmunks Vol. 2 – Alvin and the Chipmunks
- The Composer of Desafinado Plays – Antonio Carlos Jobim
- The Concert Sinatra – Frank Sinatra
- Criss-Cross – Thelonious Monk
- Conversations with Myself – Bill Evans
- Dakar – John Coltrane
- Dion Sings "Love Came to Me" – Dion DiMucci
- Ella Sings Broadway – Ella Fitzgerald
- Ella Fitzgerald Sings the Jerome Kern Songbook – Ella Fitzgerald
- Etta James Top Ten – Etta James
- Eux – Dalida
- Evenin' Blues – Jimmy Witherspoon
- The Explosive Side of Sarah Vaughan – Sarah Vaughan
- Extension – Clare Fischer
- Folk Session Inside – The Country Gentlemen
- Foolish Little Girl – The Shirelles
- Getting Sentimental over Tommy Dorsey – Jo Stafford
- Greatest Hits – The Shadows
- The Greatest Hits of the Golden Groups – Bobby Vinton
- Great Moments from Die Fledermaus – Sergio Franchi, Anna Moffo, Rise Stevens, etc.
- Have You Heard? – Dick Morrissey Quartet
- Here's Willie Nelson – Willie Nelson
- Hollywood – My Way – Nancy Wilson
- Honey in the Horn – Al Hirt
- I Am the Greatest – Cassius Clay
- "Indifferentemente" – Mario Trevi
- "Indifferentemente/Catene d'ammore" – Mario Trevi
- I Wish Tonight Would Never End – George Jones
- Impressions – John Coltrane
- India's Master Musician – Ravi Shankar
- It's Gonna Work Out Fine – Ike & Tina Turner
- John Coltrane and Johnny Hartman – John Coltrane and Johnny Hartman
- Johnny – Johnny Mathis
- Johnny's Newest Hits – Johnny Mathis
- Latin in a Satin Mood – Julie London
- Love – Rosemary Clooney
- Love on the Rocks – Julie London
- Midnight Blue – Kenny Burrell
- Mingus Mingus Mingus Mingus Mingus – Charles Mingus
- Monk's Dream – Thelonious Monk
- My Boyfriend's Back – The Angels
- My Point of View – Herbie Hancock
- My Son, the Nut – Allan Sherman
- Night Train – The Oscar Peterson Trio
- On My Way & Shoutin' Again! – Count Basie
- On the Move – Trini Lopez
- Oscar Peterson and Nelson Riddle – Oscar Peterson
- Our Man in New Orleans – Al Hirt
- Page One – Joe Henderson
- Los Relámpagos del Norte – Los Relámpagos del Norte
- Ramblin' – The New Christy Minstrels
- Rocks the Blues – Ike Turner
- Rosemary Clooney Sings Country Hits from the Heart – Rosemary Clooney
- 'Round Midnight – Betty Carter
- Sammy Davis Jr. at the Cocoanut Grove – Sammy Davis Jr.
- Say Wonderful Things – Patti Page
- Sinatra's Sinatra – Frank Sinatra
- The Songs I Love – Perry Como
- Sonny Meets Hawk! – Sonny Rollins with Coleman Hawkins
- Surfin' With Bo Diddley – Bo Diddley
- Surging Ahead – Clare Fischer
- Terry Gibbs Plays Jewish Melodies in Jazztime – Terry Gibbs
- The Dream Duet – Anna Moffo and Sergio Franchi
- These Are the Blues – Ella Fitzgerald
- Thunder'n Lightnin' – Hoyt Axton
- Trini Lopez at PJ's – Trini Lopez
- Vic Damone and Johnny Cole – Vic Damone, Johnny Cole
- Wanderlust – Frankie Laine

== Notable singles ==
- "Alone at Last" – Jackie Wilson
- "Another Saturday Night" – Sam Cooke
- "Ashita ga Arusa" – Kyu Sakamoto
- "As Usual" – Brenda Lee
- "Atlantis" – The Shadows
- "Bad to Me" – Billy J. Kramer and the Dakotas
- "Be True to Your School" – The Beach Boys
- "Birdland" – Chubby Checker
- "Blowin' in the Wind" – Peter, Paul and Mary
- "Blue Bayou" – Roy Orbison
- "Blue on Blue" – Bobby Vinton
- "Blue Velvet" – Bobby Vinton
- "Bo Diddley" – Buddy Holly
- "Brown Eyed Handsome Man" – Buddy Holly
- "Busted" – Ray Charles
- "Can't Get Used to Losing You" – Andy Williams
- "Charms" – Bobby Vee
- "Come On" – The Rolling Stones
- "Cry Baby" – Garnet Mimms & the Enchanters
- "Da Doo Ron Ron" – The Crystals
- "Daisy Petal Pickin'" – Jimmy Gilmer and the Fireballs
- "Days of Wine and Roses" – Andy Williams
- "Deep Purple" – Nino Tempo & April Stevens
- "Denise" – Randy and The Rainbows
- "Diamonds" – Jet Harris and Tony Meehan
- "Dominique" – Soeur Sourire (The Singing Nun)
- "Don't Think Twice, It's All Right" – Peter, Paul and Mary
- "Donna the Prima Donna" – Dion
- "Do You Want to Know a Secret?" – Billy J. Kramer and the Dakotas
- "Drip Drop" – Dion
- "Everybody" – Tommy Roe
- "The Folk Singer" – Tommy Roe
- "Foolish Little Girl" – The Shirelles
- "Fools Rush In (Where Angels Fear to Tread)" – Ricky Nelson
- "Foot Tapper" – The Shadows
- "From a Jack to a King" – Ned Miller
- "From Me to You" – The Beatles
- "The Grass Is Greener" – Brenda Lee
- "Hello Muddah, Hello Fadduh (A Letter from Camp)" – Allan Sherman
- "He's So Fine" – The Chiffons
- "Hooka Tooka" – Chubby Checker
- "Hopeless" – Andy Williams
- "Hotel Happiness" – Brook Benton
- "How Do You Do It?" – Gerry and the Pacemakers
- "I Can't Stay Mad at You" – Skeeter Davis
- "I Adore Him" – The Angels
- "If I Had A Hammer" – Trini Lopez
- "If You Wanna Be Happy" – Jimmy Soul
- "I Like It" – Gerry and the Pacemakers
- "I'll Keep You Satisfied" – Billy J. Kramer and the Dakotas
- "I'm Leaving It Up to You" – Dale and Grace
- "In Dreams" – Roy Orbison
- "In My Room" – The Beach Boys
- "I Only Want to Be with You" – Dusty Springfield
- "It's All in the Game" – Cliff Richard
- "It's All Right" – Impressions
- "It's My Party" – Lesley Gore
- "It's Up to You" – Rick Nelson
- "I Wanna Be Your Man" – The Rolling Stones
- "I Want to Hold Your Hand" – The Beatles
- "Java" – Al Hirt
- "Let's Limbo Some More" – Chubby Checker
- "Little Deuce Coupe" – The Beach Boys
- "Little Saint Nick" – The Beach Boys
- "Loddy Lo" – Chubby Checker
- "Loop de Loop", performed by:
  - Johnny Thunder
  - Frankie Vaughan
- "The Lord's Prayer" – The Beach Boys
- "Heat Wave" – Martha & the Vandellas
- "Louie Louie" – The Kingsmen
- "Love Me Do" – The Beatles
- "Lucky Lips" – Cliff Richard and The Shadows
- "Mean Woman Blues" – Roy Orbison
- "The Monkey Time" – Major Lance
- "My Boyfriend's Back" – The Angels
- "My Dad" – Paul Petersen
- "My Whole World Is Falling Down" – Brenda Lee
- "Navy Blue" – Diane Renay
- "The Night Has a Thousand Eyes" – Bobby Vee
- "Our Day Will Come" – Ruby & the Romantics
- "Pipeline" – The Chantays
- "Please Please Me" – The Beatles
- "Pride & Joy" – Marvin Gaye
- "Puff, the Magic Dragon" – Peter, Paul and Mary
- "Rhythm of the Rain" – The Cascades
- "Ring of Fire" – Johnny Cash
- "Say Wonderful Things – Ronnie Carroll
- "She Loves You" – The Beatles
- "She'll Never Know" – Brenda Lee
- "Shirl Girl" – Wayne Newton
- "Shut Down" – The Beach Boys
- "South Street" – The Orlons
- "Sugar and Spice" – The Searchers
- "Sugar Shack" – Jimmy Gilmer & The Fireballs ("Top Song of 1963" US)
- "Sukiyaki" – Kyu Sakamoto
- "Summer Holiday" – Cliff Richard and The Shadows
- "Surf City" – Jan and Dean
- "Surfer Girl" – The Beach Boys
- "Surfin' Bird" – The Trashmen
- "Surfin' U.S.A." – The Beach Boys
- "Sweet Dreams" – Patsy Cline
- "Sweets for My Sweet" – The Searchers
- "Tell Him" – Exciters
- "This Boy" – The Beatles
- "Turn Around" – Dick and Dee Dee
- "The Twelve Gifts of Christmas" – Allan Sherman
- "Twenty Four Hours from Tulsa" – Gene Pitney
- "Twenty Miles" – Chubby Checker
- "Two Lovers" – Mary Wells
- "Up On The Roof" – The Drifters
- "Walking the Dog" – Rufus Thomas
- "Walk Like A Man" – The Four Seasons
- "Washington Square" – The Village Stompers
- "What Will Mary Say" – Johnny Mathis
- "Wild Weekend" – The Rockin' Rebels
- "Wipe Out" – The Surfaris
- "You'll Never Walk Alone" – Gerry and the Pacemakers
- "Young and in Love" – Dick and Dee Dee
- "Your Other Love" – Connie Francis
- "Your Used to Be" – Brenda Lee

== Published popular songs ==
- "18 Yellow Roses" Bobby Darin
- "Abilene" w.m. John D. Loudermilk, Lester Brown, Bob Gibson, Albert Stanton
- "All My Loving" w.m. John Lennon & Paul McCartney
- "Another Saturday Night" w.m. Sam Cooke
- "Anyone Who Had a Heart" w. Hal David m. Burt Bacharach
- "Call Me Irresponsible" w.Sammy Cahn m. Jimmy Van Heusen from the film Papa's Delicate Condition
- "Charade" w. Johnny Mercer m. Henry Mancini. From the film of the same name.
- "Da Doo Ron Ron" w.m. Phil Spector, Ellie Greenwich & Jeff Barry
- "Detroit City" w.m. Mel Tillis & Danny Dill
- "Distant Drums" w.m. Cindy Walker
- "Dominique" Singing Nun
- "Don't Talk To Him" Cliff Richard, Welch
- "Don't You Forget It" w. Al Stillman m. Henry Mancini
- "Every Time I Think About You" w.m. Claude Demetrius
- "Flash! Bang! Wallop!" w.m. David Heneker. Introduced by Tommy Steele in the London production of the musical Half a Sixpence. Steele also performed the song in the Broadway production in 1965 and the 1967 film version (with modified lyrics).
- "Forget Him" w.m. Mark Anthony (a pseudonym of Tony Hatch)
- "From Me to You" w.m. John Lennon & Paul McCartney
- "From Russia with Love w.m. Lionel Bart
- "Good Morning, Good Day" w. Sheldon Harnick m. Jerry Bock
- "Half A Sixpence" w.m. David Heneker
- "How Do You Do It?" w.m. Mitch Murray
- "I Call Your Name" w.m. John Lennon & Paul McCartney
- "I Like It" Mitch Murray
- "I Saw Her Standing There" w.m. John Lennon & Paul McCartney
- "I Want to Hold Your Hand" w.m. John Lennon & Paul McCartney
- "If I Ruled the World" w. Leslie Bricusse m. Cyril Ornadel. Introduced by Harry Secombe in the musical Pickwick
- "It's My Party" w.m. Herb Wiener, Wally Gold & John Gluck Jnr
- "Kissin' Cousins" w.m. Fred Wise & Randy Starr
- "Losing You" w.(Eng) Carl Sigman m. Jean Renard
- "Martian Hop" w.m. Steven Rappaport, John Spirt, Robert Rappaport
- "Move Over Darling" Hal Kanter
- "On Broadway" w.m. Cynthia Weil, Barry Mann, Jerry Leiber and Mike Stoller
- "On the Beach" Welch, Marvin, Richard
- "Our Day Will Come" w.m. Bob Hilliard & Mort Garson
- "The Pink Panther Theme" w. Johnny Mercer m. Henry Mancini
- "Pretty Paper" Willie Nelson
- "The Reverend Mr. Black" Billy Edd Wheeler, Jerry Leiber and Mike Stoller (as Jed Peters)
- "Ring of Fire" w.m. Merle Kilgore & June Carter
- "She Loves Me" w. Sheldon Harnick m. Jerry Bock. Introduced by Daniel Massey in the musical She Loves Me
- "She Loves You" w.m. John Lennon & Paul McCartney
- "Surf City" w.m. Jan Berry & Brian Wilson
- "Surfer Girl" w.m. Brian Wilson
- "Talk Back Trembling Lips" w.m. John D. Loudermilk
- "This Boy" w.m. John Lennon & Paul McCartney
- "The Times They Are A-Changin'" w.m. Bob Dylan
- "The Ugly Bug Ball" w.m. Richard M. Sherman and Robert B. Sherman, from the film Summer Magic
- "Viva Las Vegas" Doc Pomus & Mort Shuman
- "Washington Square" w.m. Bob Goldstein & David Shire
- "When Joanna Loved Me" w. Robert Wells m. Jack Segal
- "Will He Like Me?" w. Sheldon Harnick m. Jerry Bock; introduced by Barbara Cook in the Broadway production of She Loves Me; performed by Anne Rogers in the 1964 London production
- "Wives And Lovers" w. Hal David m. Burt Bacharach
- "You Were Made for Me" Mitch Murray

== Other notable songs (world) ==
- "Ashita Ga Arusa" w. Yukio Aoshima m. Hachidai Nakamura
- "En gång i Stockholm" w. Beppe Wolgers m. Bobbie Ericsson
- "Miagete Goran Yoru no Hoshi o" w. Rokusuke Ei & Taku Izumi, m. Kyu Sakamoto
- "Meglio Stasera" w. Franco Migliacci m. Henry Mancini
- "Oye Como Va" w.m. Tito Puente

== Classical music ==
Classical music premieres
Composition	Composer	Date	Location	Performers
Little Symphony	Goehr, Alexander	1963-07-??	(United Kingdom) York	London Symphony Orchestra – Del Mar
Symphony No. 4	Henze, Hans Werner	1963-10-09	(West Germany) Berlin	Berlin Philharmonic – Henze
Naughty Limericks (Concerto for Orchestra No. 1)	Shchedrin, Rodion	1963-09-?	(Poland) Warsaw (Autumn)	USSR State Symphony – Rozhdestvensky
Elevamini (Symphony No. 1)	Williamson, Malcolm	1963-11-13	(Australia) Melbourne	Melbourne Symphony – Heinze

=== Compositions ===
- Benjamin Britten – Nocturnal after John Dowland, op. 70, for guitar
- Nikolai Karetnikov – Symphony No. 4
- Wojciech Kilar – Générique, for orchestra
- Witold Lutosławski – Trois poèmes d'Henri Michaux for choir and orchestra
- Francis Poulenc – Sept répons des ténèbres
- Giacinto Scelsi – String Quartet No. 3
- John Serry Sr. – American Rhapsody, transcribed for free-bass accordion.
- Karlheinz Stockhausen – Plus-Minus
- Igor Stravinsky – Abraham and Isaac
- William Walton – Variations on a Theme by Hindemith, for orchestra
- Wang Xilin – Yunnan Tone Poem

== Opera ==
- Richard Rodney Bennett – The Mines of Sulphur
- Carlisle Floyd – The Sojourner and Molly Sinclair
- Gian Carlo Menotti – The Last Savage (22 October, Paris, Opéra-Comique)
- Malcolm Williamson – Our Man in Havana
- Aarre Merikanto – Juha (composed 1922)

== Film ==
- John Addison – Tom Jones
- John Barry – From Russia with Love
- Elmer Bernstein – The Great Escape
- Ernest Gold – It's a Mad, Mad, Mad, Mad World
- Jerry Goldsmith – Lilies of the Field
- Bernard Herrmann – Jason and the Argonauts
- Henry Mancini – Charade
- Henry Mancini – The Pink Panther
- Alex North – Cleopatra
- André Previn – Irma la Douce
- Nino Rota – 8 1/2
- Humphrey Searle – The Haunting

== Musical theatre ==
- Oliver! (Music, Lyrics and Book: Lionel Bart) Broadway production opened at the Imperial Theatre on January 6 and ran for 744 performances
- She Loves Me (Music: Jerry Bock Lyrics: Sheldon Harnick Book: Joe Masteroff) Broadway production opened at the Eugene O'Neill Theatre on April 23 and ran for 302 performances
- Here's Love (Music, Lyrics and Book: Meredith Willson). Broadway production opened at the Shubert Theatre on October 3 and ran for 334 performances
- 110 in the Shade (Music: Harvey Schmidt Lyrics: Tom Jones Book: N. Richard Nash). Broadway production opened at the Broadhurst Theatre on October 24 and ran for 331 performances
- The Girl Who Came to Supper (Music and Lyrics: Noël Coward). Broadway production opened at the Broadway Theatre on December 8 and ran for 112 performances
- Carnival! (Music and Lyrics: Bob Merrill Book: Michael Stewart). London production opened at the Lyric Theatre on February 8 and ran for 34 performances
- Oh, What a Lovely War! (Music and Lyrics: Various Book: Charles Chilton). Opened at the Theatre Royal Stratford East on March 19 and transferred to Wyndham's Theatre, London on June 20 for a total run of 501 performances.
- Half A Sixpence (Music and Lyrics: David Heneker Book: Douglas Cross). London production opened at the Cambridge Theatre on March 21 and ran for 677 performances
- How To Succeed In Business Without Really Trying (Music and Lyrics: Frank Loesser Book: Abe Burrows, Jack Weinstein and Willie Gilbert). London production opened at the Shaftesbury Theatre on March 28 and ran for 520 performances.
- On the Town (Music: Leonard Bernstein Lyrics and Book: Betty Comden and Adolph Green). London production opened at the Prince Of Wales Theatre on May 30 and ran for 53 performances
- Pickwick (Music: Cyril Ornadel Lyrics: Leslie Bricusse Book: Wolf Mankowitz). London production opened at the Saville Theatre on July 4 and ran for 694 performances
- At the Drop of Another Hat (Music and Lyrics: Michael Flanders and Donald Swann). London revue opened at the Haymarket Theatre on October 2
- A Funny Thing Happened on the Way to the Forum (Music and Lyrics: Stephen Sondheim Book: Burt Shevelove and Larry Gelbart). London production opened at the Strand Theatre on October 3 and ran for 762 performances
- The Boys From Syracuse (Music: Richard Rodgers Lyrics: Lorenz Hart Book: George Abbott). London production opened at the Drury Lane Theatre on November 7 and ran for 100 performances

== Musical films ==
- Bye Bye Birdie, starring Dick Van Dyke and Ann-Margret
- Fun in Acapulco, starring Elvis Presley and Ursula Andress
- Summer Holiday, British musical featuring Cliff Richard
- Summer Magic starring Hayley Mills, Burl Ives, Dorothy McGuire and Eddie Hodges

== Births ==
- January 4 – Till Lindemann, German rock musician (Rammstein)
- January 7 – Mariella Farré, Swiss singer
- January 13 – Tim Kelly, American rock musician (Slaughter) (d. 1998)
- January 15 – Conrad Lant, English singer-songwriter and bass player (Venom and Cronos)
- January 17 – Kai Hansen, German power metal guitarist and singer
- January 19 – Caron Wheeler, British singer-songwriter (Soul II Soul)
- January 25 – Kurt Harland, American singer, songwriter and audio engineer (Information Society)
- January 26
  - Jazzie B, English DJ and music producer (Soul II Soul)
  - Andrew Ridgeley, English singer-songwriter (Wham!)
- January 28 – Dan Spitz, American thrash metal guitarist (Anthrax) and watchmaker
- January 29 – Octave, Romanian guitarist, songwriter and producer
- February 2 – Eva Cassidy, American singer and guitarist (d. 1996)
- February 3 – Antoine "T.C.D." Lundy, American R&B singer (Force MDs) (d. 1998)
- February 4 – Noodles, American guitarist (The Offspring)
- February 8
  - Joshua Kadison, American singer-songwriter and pianist
  - Paul Robb, American Synthesizer player, producer and songwriter (Information Society)
- February 9 – Travis Tritt, American country singer
- February 10
  - Smiley Culture, British rapper and reggae singer (d. 2011)
  - Tony Reno, Swedish rock drummer (Europe)
- February 15 – Guildo Horn, German singer
- February 19 – Seal, British singer
- February 23 – Tats Lau, Hong Kong musician, songwriter, singer and actor
- March 1 – Dan Michaels, producer, saxophonist, member of the rock band The Choir and The Swirling Eddies, owner of Galaxy21 Music.
- March 4
  - Janey Lee Grace, British singer, author, television presenter and radio disc jockey
  - Jason Newsted, American rock bassist Metallica
- March 5 – Lotta Engberg, Swedish singer
- March 10 – Jeff Ament (Pearl Jam, Green River)
- March 11
  - Stacy Earl, American dance/pop singer
  - David LaChapelle, Music video director, photographer and movie director
- March 13 – Fito Páez, Argentine musician
- March 15 – Bret Michaels, rock singer (Poison)
- March 16 – Jerome Flynn, British actor and singer (Robson & Jerome)
- March 17
  - Michael Ivins, American rock bassist (The Flaming Lips)
  - Nick Peros, Canadian composer
- March 18 – Vanessa Williams, American singer and actress
- March 21 – Shawn Lane, American guitar virtuoso (d. 2003)
- March 22 – Susan Ann Sulley, English synth-pop singer (The Human League)
- March 27
  - Charly Alberti, Argentinian musician
  - Dave Koz, American jazz musician
- March 30 – Eli-Eri Moura, Brazilian composer, conductor and music theorist
- April 1 – Teddy Diaz, Filipino musician and composer (d. 1988)
- April 3 – Criss Oliva, American metal guitarist (Savatage) (d. 1993)
- April 6 – Andrew Weatherall, English disc jockey and remixer (d. 2020)
- April 8 – Julian Lennon, singer-songwriter, son of John Lennon
- April 10 – Warren DeMartini, American rock guitarist (Ratt)
- April 16 – Jimmy Osmond, American singers
- April 21 – Johnny McElhone, Scottish guitarist (Texas)
- April 24 – Tõnu Trubetsky, Estonian rock musician (Vennaskond)
- May 5 – Prince Ital Joe, reggae singer (d. 2001)
- May 8
  - Sylvain Cossette, Canadian singer-songwriter (Paradox)
  - Anthony Field, Australian musician and actor
- May 9 – Barry Douglas Lamb, English musician, author and preacher
- May 12 – Charles Pettigrew, American soul singer (Charles & Eddie) (d. 2001)
- May 19 – Filippo Galli, Italian manager and former football player
- May 21 – Gilles Apap, violinist
- June 4 – Sandeep Bhagwati, Indian classical musician and composer
- June 5 – Joe Rudán, Hungarian heavy metal singer
- June 7
  - Roberto Alagna, operatic tenor
  - Gordon Gano, singer & guitarist (Violent Femmes)
- June 11 – Gioia Bruno, Italian-American singer and songwriter (Exposé)
- June 18 – Dizzy Reed, American keyboard player, songwriter and actor (Guns N' Roses, Johnny Crash)
- June 20
  - Amir Derakh, rock musician (Orgy)
  - Julien-K
- June 25
  - Super Cat, Jamaican DJ
  - George Michael, English singer and songwriter (d. 2016)
- June 28 – Tierney Sutton, American singer
- June 29 – Anne-Sophie Mutter, German violinist
- June 30 – Yngwie J. Malmsteen, guitar performer
- July 7 – Vonda Shepard, singer and musician
- July 16 – Norman Cook (Fatboy Slim), English big-beat musician
- July 17 – Regina Belle, American singer-songwriter and producer
- July 19 – Bertrand Burgalat, French musician, composer and producer
- July 22 – Emily Saliers, American singer-songwriter musician (Indigo Girls)
- July 23 – Renato Borghetti, folk musician and composer
- July 24
  - Larry Rudolph, Britney Spears collaborator and pop music manager/agent
  - Karl Malone, American basketball player and coach
- July 25 – Oliver Froning, German musician (Dune)
- July 26 – Andy Timmons, American guitarist (Danger Danger)
- July 28 – Katharina Franck, German singer and songwriter
- July 28 – Beverley Craven, English singer and songwriter
- July 28 – Shaunna Hall, American composer and musician (4 Non Blondes and Parliament-Funkadelic)
- August 1 – Coolio, African American rapper (d. 2022)
- August 3
  - Tasmin Archer, English singer
  - James Hetfield, American rock singer (Metallica)
- August 9 – Whitney Houston, African American singer and actress (d. 2012)
- August 12
  - Karen Briggs, African American jazz violinist
  - Sir Mix-a-Lot (Anthony Ray), African American MC and producer
- August 15 – Lady Miss Kier, American singer, songwriter, and DJ (Deee-Lite)
- August 19 – Joey Tempest, Swedish rock singer (Europe)
- August 22
  - Tori Amos, American singer-songwriter, pianist and composer
  - James DeBarge (DeBarge)
- August 23 – Laura Flores, Mexican actress, hostess, and singer
- August 25 – Candida Doyle, English keyboardist and singer (Pulp)
- August 26 – Liu Huan, Chinese singer
- August 30 – Paul Oakenfold, British disc jockey
- August 31
  - Reb Beach, American rock guitarist (Winger, Whitesnake)
  - Beverly Crawford, American gospel singer
- September 1 – Carola Smit, Dutch musician
- September 5 – Terry Ellis, American singer (En Vogue)
- September 6 – Mark Chesnutt, American country musician
- September 7 – Eazy-E, American West Coast rapper and record producer (d. 1995)
- September 16 – Richard Marx, American singer-songwriter
- September 19 – Jarvis Cocker, British musician and singer (Pulp)
- September 22 – Arzu Ece, Turkish singer
- September 28 – Dan Forden, video game music composer (Mortal Kombat)
- September 29
  - Les Claypool, American rock bassist and singer (Primus)
  - O'Landa Draper (O'Landa Draper and the Associates gospel choir) (d. 1998)
- October 7 – Ann Curless, American singer (Exposé)
- October 13 – Kemi Olusanya, English drum-and-bass musician (Kemistry & Storm) (d. 1999)
- October 10 – Anita Mui, Hong Kong singer and actress
- October 14 – Alessandro Safina, operatic tenor
- October 19 – Sinitta, American singer and actress
- October 20 – John Storgårds, Finnish conductor and violinist
- October 23
  - Thomas Di Leva, Swedish singer-songwriter
  - Chris Sheppard, Canadian DJ, record producer and musician (Love Inc.)
- October 26 – Natalie Merchant, American indie singer-songwriter
- October 27
  - Marla Maples, American actress, musician and television personality
  - Lou, German pop singer
- November 1 – Rick Allen, British drummer (Def Leppard)
- November 2 – Bobby Dall, American rock bassist (Poison)
- November 8 – Eric B., American rapper, record producer and DJ (Eric B. & Rakim)
- November 12 – Sam Lloyd, American actor and singer (The Blanks)
- November 17 – Jonny Jakobsen, Danish-Swedish eurodance singer
- November 25 – Danuta Lato, Polish glamour model, actress, and singer
- December 9 – Kat Bjelland, American singer, songwriter, musician and guitarist.
- December 10 – Ole Amund Gjersvik, Norwegian bassist and composer
- December 15 – Helen Slater, American singer, actress and songwriter
- December 18 – Nino de Angelo, German singer
- December 24 – Mary Ramsey, American musician, singer/songwriter (10,000 Maniacs, John & Mary)
- December 26 – Lars Ulrich, Danish-born heavy metal drummer (Metallica)
- December 31 – Scott Ian, American thrash metal guitarist (Anthrax)
- Unknown – Naseer Shamma, Iraqi musician and oud player

== Deaths ==
- January 2 – Dick Powell, actor and singer, 58 (lung cancer)
- January 6 – Lina Abarbanell, German-American soprano, 84
- January 24 – Otto Harbach, lyricist, 89
- January 30 – Francis Poulenc, French composer, 64
- February 19 – Benny Moré, Cuban singer, 43 (cirrhosis of the liver)
- February 20 – Ferenc Fricsay, conductor, 48 (cancer)
- March 5 – Patsy Cline, American country/pop singer, 30 (plane crash)
- March 17 – Lizzie Miles, singer, 67
- March 28 – Alec Templeton, Welsh composer, 52
- March 30 – Aleksandr Gauk, Russian conductor and composer, 69
- March 31 – Harry Akst, US composer and pianist, 68
- April 9
  - Eddie Edwards, American jazz trombonist, 71
  - Benno Moiseiwitsch, Jewish-Ukrainian pianist, 73
- April 11 – Arvid Gram Paulsen, Norwegian jazz saxophonist and trumpeter, 41
- April 12 – Herbie Nichols, jazz musician, 44 (leukemia)
- May 6 – Ted Weems, US bandleader, 61
- May 10 – Irving Aaronson, bandleader and composer, 68
- May 24 – Elmore James, American blues guitarist, 45 (heart attack)
- June 24 – Sybil Evers, mezzo-soprano and actress, 59
- August 15 – John Powell, pianist, composer and ethnomusicologist, 80
- August 23 – Glen Gray, American saxophonist and conductor, 63
- September 3 – Frico Kafenda, Slovak composer, 79
- September 12 – Modest Altschuler, cellist, conductor and composer, 90
- September 25 – Alexander Sakharoff, Russian dancer and choreographer, 77
- October 11 – Édith Piaf, French singing superstar, 47 (liver cancer)
- October 25 – Roger Désormière, French conductor, 65
- November 1 – Elsa Maxwell, songwriter, "the hostess with the mostest", 80
- November 15 – Fritz Reiner, Hungarian conductor, 74
- November 19 – Carmen Amaya, flamenco dancer and singer, 50
- November 26 – Amelita Galli-Curci, operatic soprano, 81
- November 29 – Ernesto Lecuona, Cuban composer, pianist and bandleader, 68
- December 5 – Karl Amadeus Hartmann, composer, 58 (stomach cancer)
- December 14 – Dinah Washington, singer, 39
- December 28 – Paul Hindemith, composer, 68
- date unknown – Naftule Brandwein, clarinettist

== Awards ==
=== Grammy Awards ===
- Grammy Awards of 1963

=== Eurovision Song Contest ===
- Eurovision Song Contest 1963

=== Leeds International Piano Competition ===
- Michael Roll

== See also ==
- List of Billboard Hot 100 number ones of 1963
- Billboard Top Country Singles of 1963
- Billboard year-end top 50 R&B singles of 1963
