= Black Ozarkers =

Inhabitants of African descent in the Ozarks Mountain region

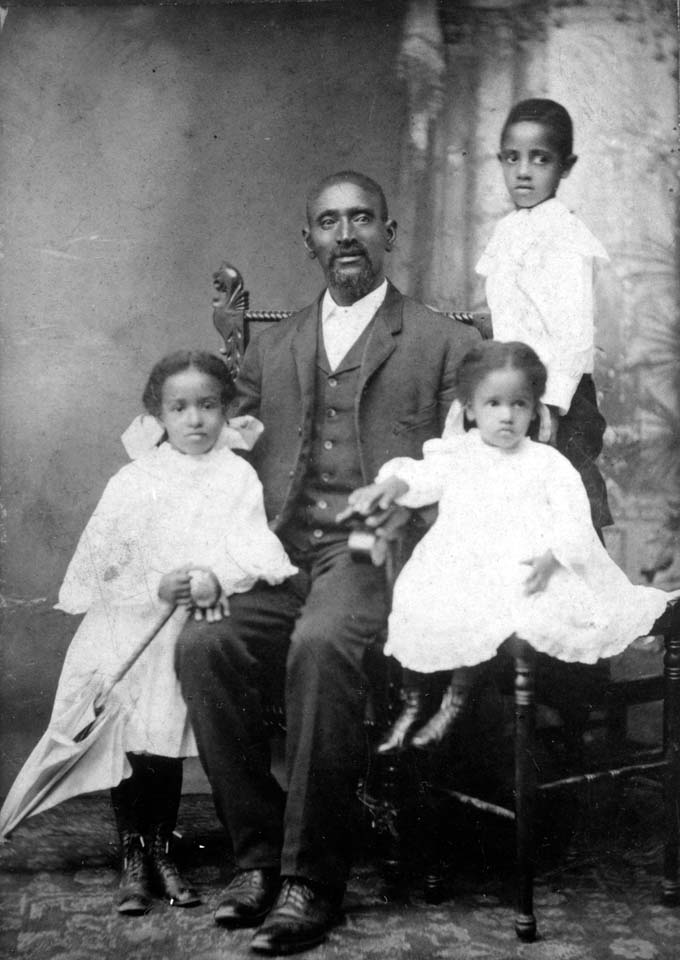
The Johnsons, a Black Ozarker family from Franklin County, Missouri, in the northeastern Ozarks, c. 1890s

Black Ozarkers, who have also been called Ozark Mountain Blacks, are African Americans who are native to or residents of the once isolated Ozarks uplift, a forested and mountainous geo-cultural region in Missouri, Arkansas, Oklahoma, and Kansas. They are mostly descendants of the enslaved from America's upper south and Appalachian region of Tennessee, Kentucky, Virginia, and North Carolina, being brought by European American slave owners in the western expansion beginning in the early 19th century.

Some are also descendants of Black people brought to the region enslaved by Native Americans on the Trail of Tears or up the Mississippi River by the French to work on small farms and in mineral mines during the French and Spanish colonial period. There was also a number of families that voluntarily migrated into the region and settled before and after the Civil War. All are of African ancestry, with many also having biracial heritage – being of both African and European descent or African and Native American descent. Some, like the Black Ozark folk artist Joseph Yoakum, were of triracial heritage, descending from all three.

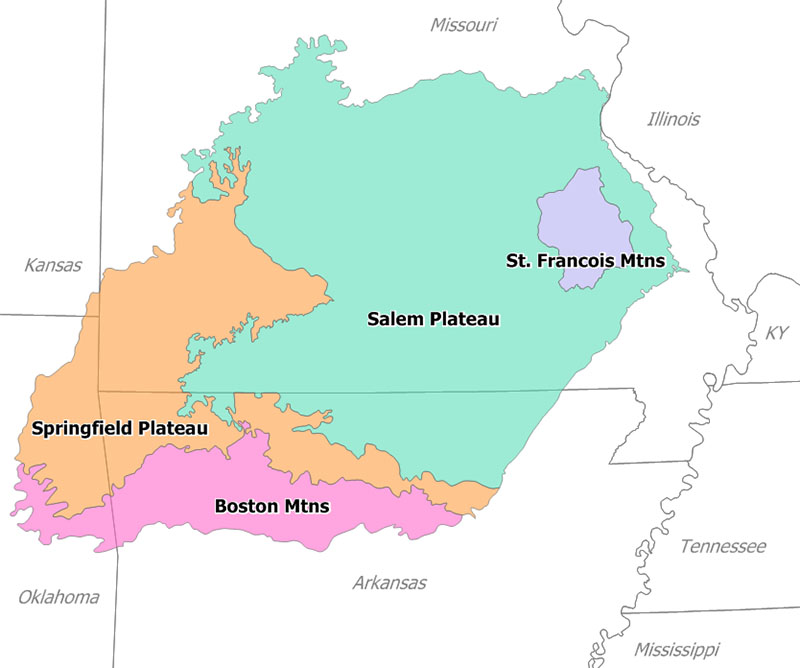
Geographical map of the Ozark uplift

== Slavery ==
Slavery in the Ozarks was not as prevalent as slavery was in the deep south, with some counties being free of Black people and slave labor; however, slavery played a part of the fabric and formation of many Ozark communities. By 1860 there were around 32,000 slaves in the Ozark uplift – few lived on large plantations and most lived on small farms or in urban areas and worked in households, mineral mines or in manufacturing plants. Of the more than 32,000 slaves documented in the Ozark uplift in the 1860 census, at least 20 percent of all the enslaved were mulatto, with 13 counties mostly in the interior containing slave populations that were at least one-third mulatto, the enslaved in the Ozarks were twice as likely to be mulatto than slaves in the nation as a whole, a sign that sexual violence and exploitation was rampant in slave owning communities throughout the region. The word "mulatto" is a historical racial term that describes someone of mixed White and Black ancestry. The term mulatto was used to try and establish taxonomies of race and is now widely understood to be an offensive racial slur.

The Black Ozarkers, coming mostly from small slave holdings, performed a multitude of tasks – skilled and unskilled. They worked on farms as field hands, tended to farm animals, were butlers, maids, butchers, cooks, carpenters, blacksmiths, masons, nurses, seamstresses, lumbermen and miners. The diversity of skills that the enslaved performed and developed in the Ozarks, especially in Missouri, gave them an advantage in the early years after emancipation, in contrast to others formally enslaved from other regions who were confined to a single skill or production of a single crop. During the Civil War many of the enslaved in the Ozarks rebelled by running away. This was documented in the 1863 slave scheduled for Cass Township in Greene County, MO, where it was reported that one-third of the slave population had run away. Escaped slaves often headed towards free territory in Kansas and were often assisted by white Jayhawkers, who were militant abolitionist notorious for raiding pro-slavery communities and escorting fugitive slaves to Kansas. Others found refuge within camps of Union Soldiers, some would end up joining and serving the Union in the war.

== Post-Civil War ==
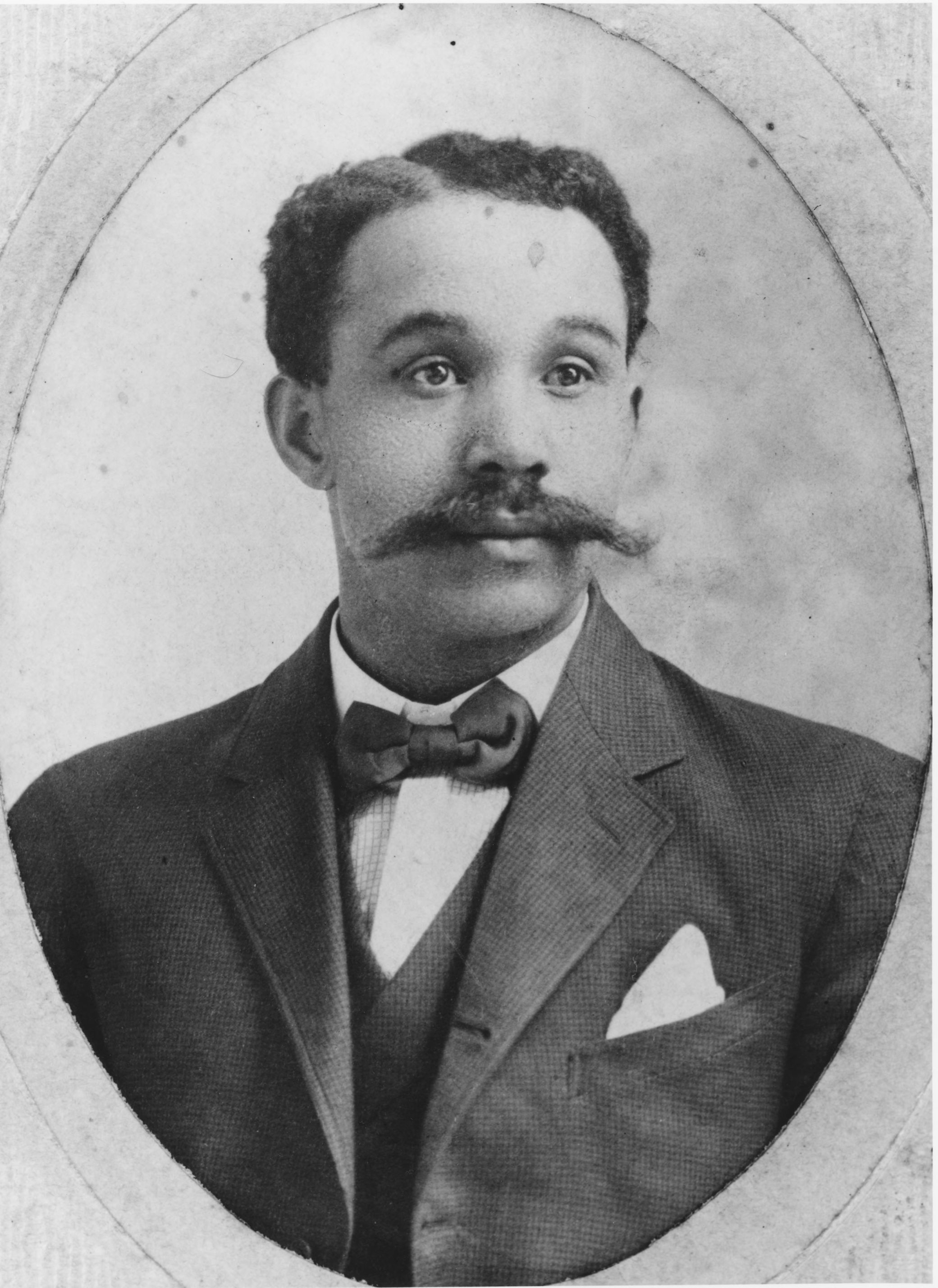
Thomas Tindall, Black Ozarker and member of the Tindall family that owned a stone quarry, farmland, amusement park, meat market, and packing plant in Greene County. c. 1900

In the decades after the Civil War, emancipated slaves – or Freedmen, as they were called – who were native to the Ozarks, and others who migrated to the region would continue to the Ozark communities. Some lived in isolated rural areas and in small towns – such as Fayetteville and Eureka Springs. Some were teachers and ministers, some ran businesses from their home like laundries, cafe's, juke joints and boarding houses, renting rooms to travelers. Their communities were small and tight-knit, usually having no more than 1 or 2 churches and a single schoolhouse. In the more urban areas, they lived in larger segregated Black communities. Greene County, Missouri, which had one of the largest concentrations of Black people in the Ozarks pre and post Civil War, was home to a large black middle-class. In the city of Springfield, which is known as the Queen City of the Ozarks, the black community made up over 22 percent of the total population in 1880 and by 1900 would boast several black owned grocery stores, one of which was the largest in the city. Springfield and the surrounding area was home to a variety of several Black owned businesses, there were many churches, adequate schools, various social clubs, a large number of property owners, farmers, artisans, craftsman and black professionals like doctors, lawyers, educators, barbers, postal workers, city workers and politicians.

== Exodus ==
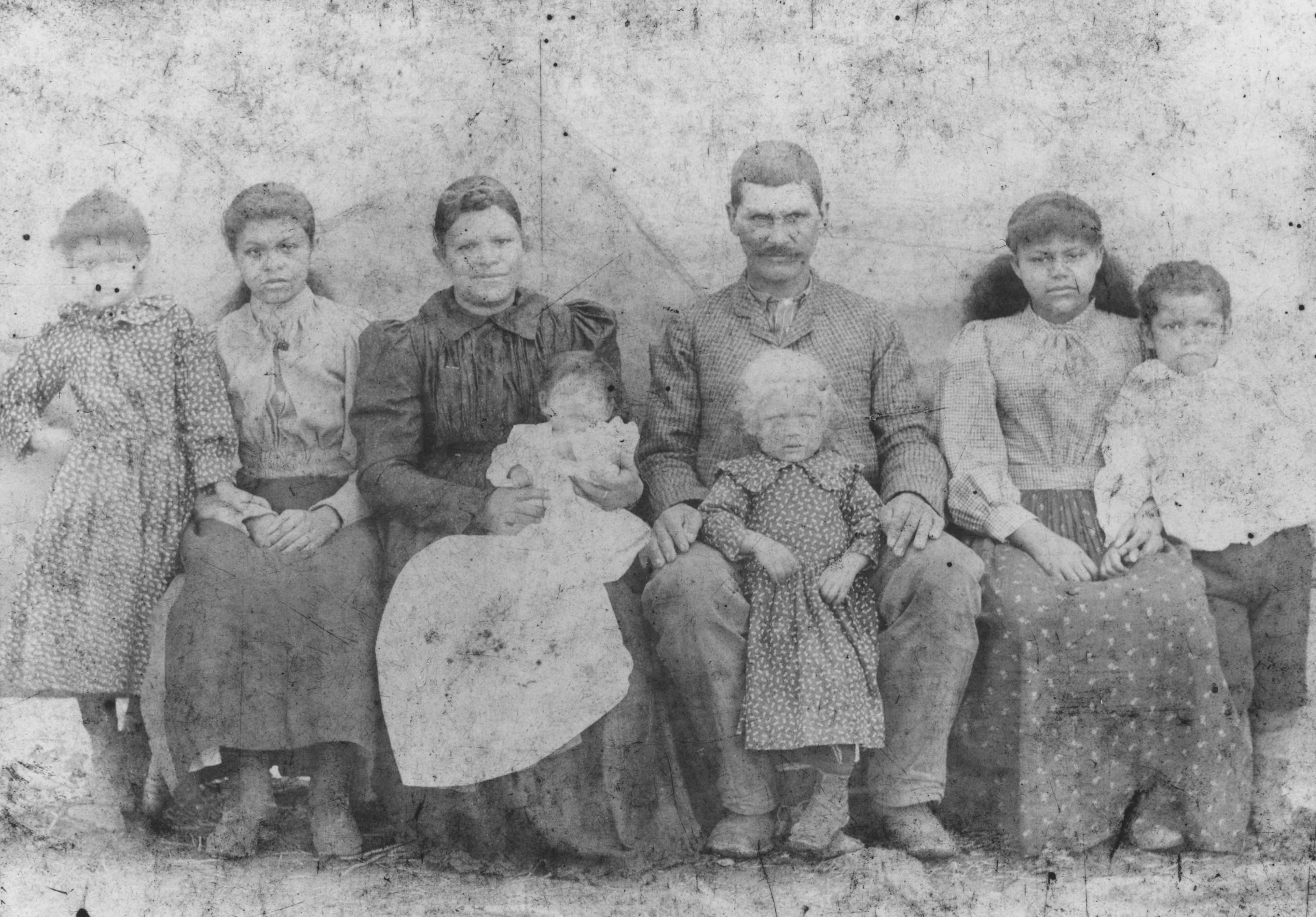
The Triplett family, Black Ozarkers from rural Dade County, Missouri, ca 1890's.

From the early days of settlement to post Civil War and beyond, some whites in the region resented the presence of free black people and also the competition for labor jobs, land and political power. In the 1890s and early 1900s, a racial cleansing campaign pushed by racist organizations and media would play a major role in the anti-black attitudes among some white Ozarkers, often pushing propaganda that villainized black people, portrayed the black community as criminal and savage and created mass hysteria that would lead to an outbreak of intimidation and violence. From 1894 to 1909, a series of race riots and lynchings in southwest Missouri and northwest Arkansas caused fear and tension in the black communities throughout the Ozarks. This led to a mass exodus of Afro-Americans from the Ozarks by the thousands; some estimates estimate the figure to be as high as 40,000. Many permanently left for St. Louis, Kansas City and other cities further west in Kansas and Oklahoma. Today, a small number of Black Ozarkers remain throughout the region, with most concentrated in the more urban areas.

== Culture ==
=== Music ===
Black Ozarkers shared many cultural traits with other groups inhabiting the Ozarks. After generations and centuries of cohabiting in close proximity to Native Americans and Europeans due to settlement and the conditions of slavery, there was an exchange and sometimes syncretism of cultures. That was evident in their musical practices. Popular instruments in Ozark communities throughout the 19th and early 20th century included the banjo, which was brought to America by enslaved West Africans and the fiddle and bones which were brought by Western Europeans. These instruments were played and enjoyed by the Native Americans, Euro-Americans and the Afro-Americans who sometimes played them together and in a way heavily influenced by the slave communities and their African roots. In the Oklahoma region of the Ozarks, in the Cherokee Nation and neighboring communities, dances were held during the Christmas season when some slaves were given a week to a month off from labor to go and visit family members at nearby plantations. These dances where an exchange of culture and influences came together, were attended by the Cherokee, Whites and Blacks both enslaved and free, where all danced, played instruments and enjoyed the festivities. Another example of the blending of cultures and influences includes the music that came out of the church. In the Ozarks many of the enslaved attended church with their enslavers, though segregated they would sing together. In the Oklahoma Ozarks the enslaved would sing some songs in the Cherokee language, hymns of English origin and spirituals with shouts, robust dancing and the call and response practice that came from their West African heritage.

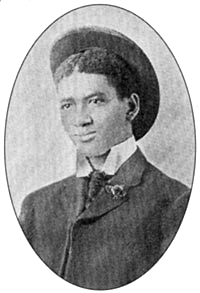
James Scott, piano prodigy and American ragtime composer.

After emancipation and throughout the late 19th and early 20th century, music traditions in the Black communities of the Ozarks were kept alive inside of Black institutions like the church and schools, also with parents and elders passing on their knowledge and teaching the younger generations. Many Black musicians across the Ozarks would use their musical talents to find work and make a living. Banjo and fiddle players would play at weekend parties and dances for both Black and White audiences. Piano players and organist played in churches, saloons, juke joints, brothels and gaming houses. Later vocal groups and brass bands were formed and would find work at clubs, resorts and social events. Some musicians would give music lessons, become musically literate and teach music formally at schools. Some would find local fame and others would reach audiences across the country having an impact on American pop culture and early American music genres like ragtime, jazz, blues and country. Musicians like William A. Driver, from Laclede County, would become one of the most celebrated fiddlers in Missouri in the early 20th century. Musicians like James Scott from Neosho, would be regarded as one of the most important and influential ragtime composers, second only to Scott Joplin. The vocal quintet The Philharmonics, who were born out of the Black church in the Ozarks, would make history for being among the first Black Americans to make regular appearances on nationally broadcast television in the 1950s.

=== Religion ===
Historically Black Ozarkers throughout the region have predominantly been of Protestant faith, though there has also long been a small Black Catholic presence in the eastern Ozark border region of Missouri, in old French settlements like Ste. Geneveive.

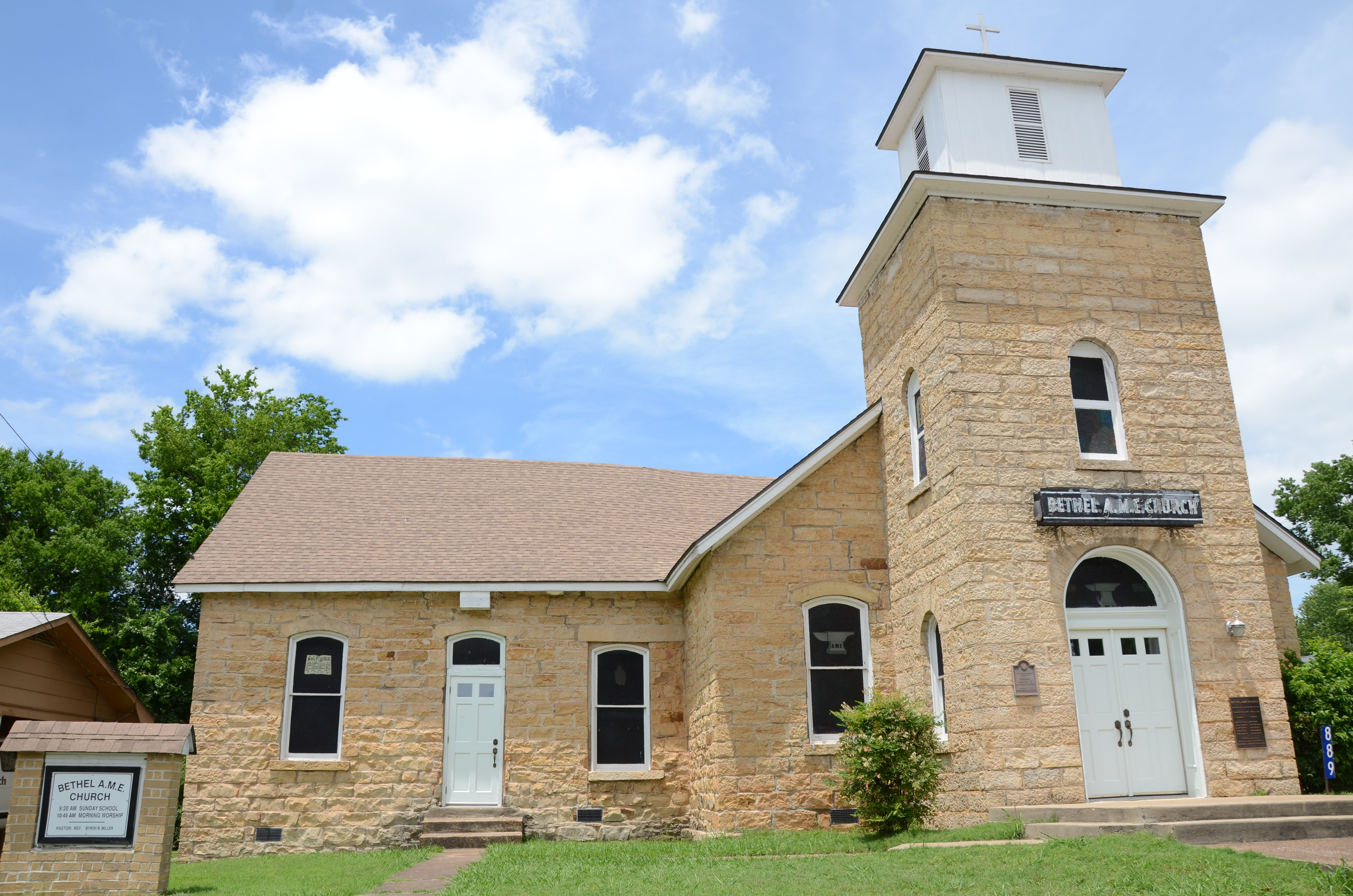
Bethel African Methodist Episcopal Church, Batesville, AR built in 1881.

Churches in the Black communities of the Ozarks were centers of Black life and culture. They often doubled as schools and educational centers, served as rallying points for community members to organize and provided safe spaces for recreation and for Black people to worship. Black churches in the Ozarks are some of the oldest and continuously operating institutions in the region. Some Black congregations date back to the 1840s and were formed during slavery, while others were formed after the Civil War. Some of the historic church buildings that date back to the late 1800s and early 1900s, are still standing and some are still in use.

=== Celebrations ===
A more distinct part of traditional Black Ozark culture was and continues to be the celebration of Emancipation Day, a holiday celebrated on August 4 by Afro-Americans throughout the entire Ozark region marking the end of slavery. August 4 was likely chosen as a suitable day, one month after American Independence to represent freedom but a freedom deferred to Afro-Americans. Every year dating back to the 1860s in northeast Oklahoma, northwest Arkansas and all over the Missouri Ozarks, the Black communities would come together by the hundreds and the thousands in cities and towns and have picnics, barbecues, dances, parades and balls. Activities would include cakewalk contests, games of horseshoe, baseball and the crowning of Queens. There would be singalongs to old plantation songs, popular folks songs and spirituals. Performances and parades led by marching bands, brass bands and fiddlers. There would be a feast of barbecued meats like beef, lamb, goat, chicken, hogs and plenty of deserts. There would be speeches made by preachers, activist, politicians and other community leaders. This is a tradition that continues today after more than 150 years in some communities in and around the Ozarks.

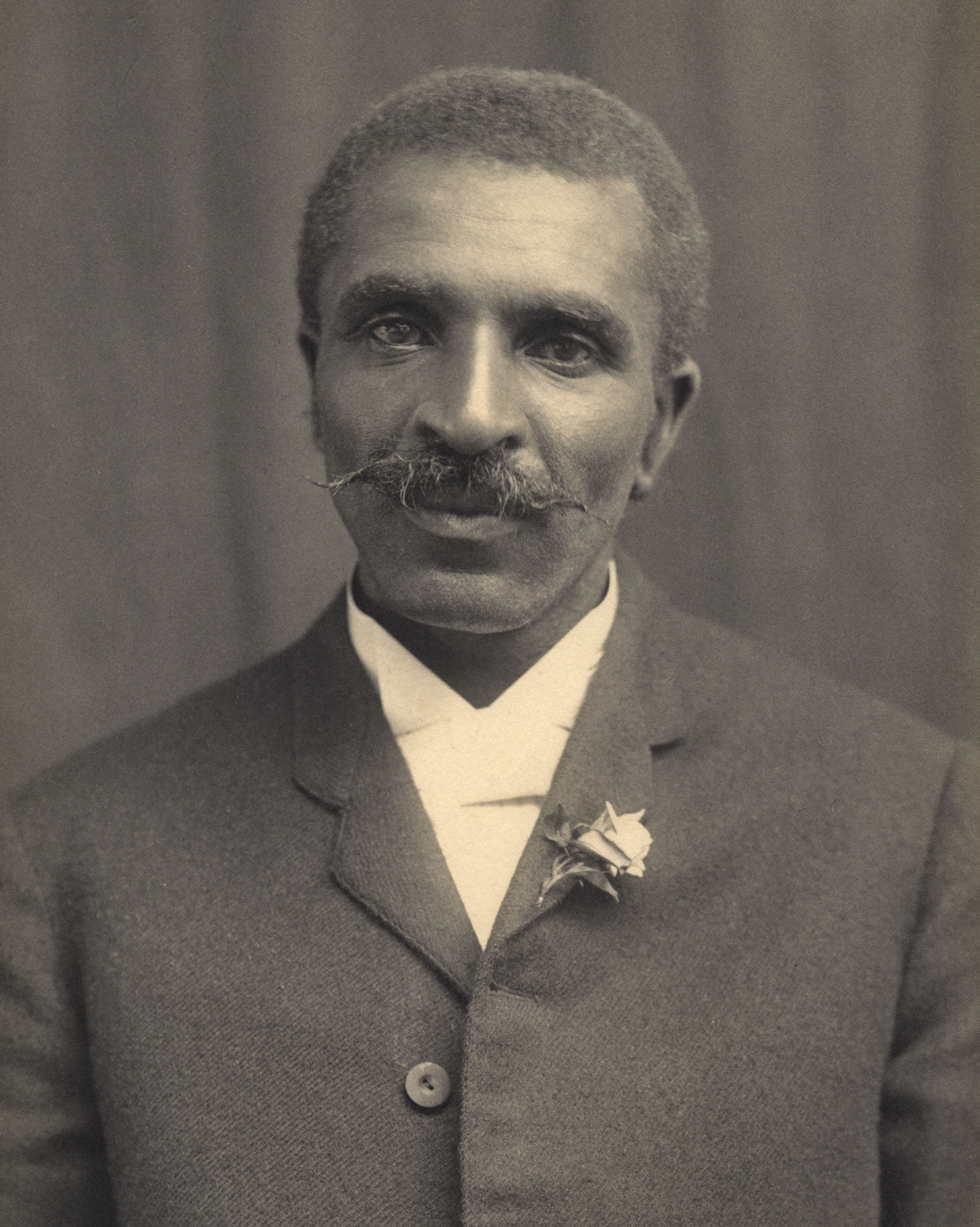
George Washington Carver, a native of the Ozarks and one of America's most prominent scientists, inventors and educators of the early 20th century.

== Notable people ==
- George Washington Carver
- Bass Reeves
- Phillarmonics
- James Scott
- Joseph Yoakum
- Jessie Wilkins
- Mary slave
- Lynching of two (Aaron and Anthony)
- William Tecumseh Vernon
- John A. Lankford
- Oliver Brown
- C. T. Vivian
- Julia Lee
- George Ewing Lee

== See also ==
- Black Southerners
- Multiracial Americans
- History of slavery in Missouri
- History of slavery in Oklahoma
