= Courtenay Bartholomew =

Physician and scientist (1931–2021)

- Born: 1931; Port of Spain, Trinidad and Tobago
- Died: 7 May 2021 (aged 89)
- Education: Nelson Street Boys' RC School (Primary School); St. Mary's College (Secondary School); University College Dublin (MB, BCh, BAO); Royal College of Physicians of Edinburgh (Gastroenterology specialty degree); National University of Ireland (D.M.)
- Occupations: Professor of medicine at University of the West Indies (1977); Lecturer at University of the West Indies (1967)
- Known for: Physician, Scientist, Author
- Notable work: AIDS, HIV, internal diseases, Hepatitis A and B
- Awards: International Human Retrovirology Society Award (1991); Chaconia Gold Medal, Government of Trinidad and Tobago (1975)
- Honours: University College Dublin's Honorary Fellowship of the Faculty of Medicine (2004); Member of the International Bioethics Committee of UNESCO

Courtenay Felix Bartholomew (1931 – 7 May 2021) was a Trinidad and Tobago physician, scientist, and author. He was the founder and director of the Medical Research Foundation of Trinidad and Tobago. He was active in HIV/AIDS research, and was notable for diagnosing the first case of AIDS in the English-speaking Caribbean. He also led HIV vaccine trials and research on retroviruses with US institutions.

== Early life and education ==
Courtenay Bartholomew was born in 1931 and grew up in Port of Spain, Trinidad and Tobago. He attended Nelson Street Boys’ RC School and St. Mary’s College. He had a keen interest in biology and chemistry, but disliked physics: his dream was to become a physician. Two people inspired him the most: Dr. Aldwin Gerard Francis and his own uncle, who also wanted to become a physician but was forced to abandon this dream due to racial prejudice in Canada.

In 1960, Bartholomew graduated from University College Dublin where he studied internal medicine. In 1964, he obtained a specialty degree in gastroenterology from the Royal College of Physicians of Edinburgh, making him the first West Indian to obtain a degree in gastroenterology. In 1965, he obtained a Doctorate in Medicine from the National University of Ireland.

== Academic career ==
In 1967, Bartholomew became the first lecturer in medicine at The University of the West Indies (St. Augustine Campus). In 1977, he became the first professor of medicine at the University of the West Indies (St. Augustine Campus).

Bartholomew researched HIV and AIDS. He diagnosed the first case of AIDS in the English-speaking Caribbean. He led HIV vaccine trials and research on retroviruses with US institutions. He also studied internal diseases, scorpion sting venom, acute pancreatitis, Hepatitis A and B. He was the first local physician to become a member of the Royal College of Physicians, London without examination. He held Fellowships from the Royal Colleges of Ireland, Edinburgh and London.

He received University College Dublin’s highest honour of Honorary Fellowship of the Faculty of Medicine (2004) and the International Human Retrovirology Society Award (1991) for his outstanding contributions to medicine.

He was a member of the World AIDS Foundation Scientific Advisory Committee and an advocate for public education on AIDS.

Bartholomew was an advocate for fostering education and the use of libraries. He encouraged students to "be good at whatever you do", urged scientists to "be inquisitive to want to learn more" and highlighted the importance of teachers, as “teachers are there to guide and motivate”.

== Religious activity ==
Bartholomew restored several churches in Trinidad. He authored several books focusing on Mary, mother of Jesus, including three titles including the phrase "A Scientist Researches Mary".

== Death ==
Bartholomew died on 7 May 2021, at the age of 89.

== Honours and awards ==
- University College Dublin Honorary Fellowship of the Faculty of Medicine
- International Human Retrovirology Society Award
- Membership of the Royal College of Physicians, London
- Chaconia Gold Medal, Government of Trinidad and Tobago
- Order of the Republic of Trinidad and Tobago

== Bibliography ==
- A Scientist Researches Mary: The Ark of the Covenant (1995) ISBN 978-1-89013-708-3
- A Scientist Researches Mary, Mother and Coredemptrix (1998) ISBN 978-1-89013-710-6
- A Scientist Researches Mary, Mother of All Nations (1999) ISBN 978-1-57918-123-9
- Her Majesty Mary, Queen of Peace: End Times Prophecies and Warnings of Mary (2002) ISBN 978-1-57918-192-5
- The Immaculate Heart of Mary, Jesus Eucharist and Mother Seton's Emmitsburg (2003) ISBN 978-1-57918-244-1
- The Passion of the Christ and His Mother: Including the Linkage with Exodus and the Night of the Passover (2004) ISBN 978-15-7918-249-6
- The Last Help Before the End of Time: The Ultimate Message of Fatima (2005) ISBN 978-1-57918-271-7
- The End of This Era: A Linkage of Science and Religion (2009) ISBN 978-1-57918-372-1
