= Your Used to Be =

Single by Brenda Lee
- B-side: "She'll Never Know"
- Released: January 1963
- Genre: Pop
- Length: 2:10
- Label: Decca 31454
- Songwriter(s): Howard Greenfield, Jack Keller

Brenda Lee singles chronology
"All Alone Am I" (1962)	"Your Used to Be" (1963)	"Losing You" (1963)

"Your Used to Be" is a song written by Howard Greenfield and Jack Keller and performed by Brenda Lee. The song reached #12 on the adult contemporary chart and #32 on the Billboard Hot 100 in 1963. In Australia, the song also reached #19.
