= Cardinal Records =

Cardinal Records has been the name of at least three different record labels in the 20th century:

- Cardinal Records (1920s), a US based company
- Cardinal Records (1950s), a US based company
- Cardinal Records (1964), a Belgian based company

== See also ==
- List of record labels
