= Losing You (Brenda Lee song) =

Single by Brenda Lee

from the album ..."Let Me Sing"
- B-side: "He's So Heavenly"
- Released: March 1963
- Recorded: 20 February 1963
- Genre: Pop
- Length: 2:28
- Label: Decca 31478
- Songwriters: Jean Renard, Carl Sigman
- Producer: Owen Bradley

Brenda Lee singles chronology
"Your Used to Be" / "She'll Never Know" (1963)	"Losing You" (1963)	"I Wonder" / "My Whole World Is Falling Down" (1963)

"Losing You" is a song written by Jean Renard and Carl Sigman and performed by Brenda Lee. The song reached #2 on the adult contemporary chart, #6 on the Billboard Hot 100, #10 in the UK, and #13 on the R&B chart in 1963. The song is featured on her 1963 album, ..."Let Me Sing".

The song was produced by Owen Bradley. The single's B-side, "He's So Heavenly", reached #93 on the Billboard Hot 100.

The song was ranked #62 on Billboard magazine's Top Hot 100 songs of 1963.

== Other versions ==
- Doris Day released a version on her 1963 album, Love Him.
- Bobby Russell released a version as the B-side to his 1963 single, "Still".
- Lale Andersen released a German version called Grau war der Ozean (Grey Was the Ocean) on a single in 1963.
- Orietta Berti released a version as part of an EP in 1964 entitled "Perdendoti".
- Al Martino released a version as part of an EP in 1964.
- Nora Aunor released a version on her 1971 album, The Song of My Life.
- Alison Krauss released a version as the lead single from her 2017 solo album, Windy City.
- Paul Carrack released a version under the name "I'm Losing You" on his Rain or Shine album.

== Charts ==
Chart (1963)	Peak position
Australia	15
Belgium (Ultratop 50 Flanders)	18
Belgium (Ultratop 50 Wallonia)	34
Canada (CHUM Hit Parade)	20
New Zealand (Lever Hit Parade)	6
UK Record Retailer	10
US Billboard Hot 100	6
US Billboard Middle-Road Singles	2
US Billboard Hot R&B Sides	13
