= Hopeless (Andy Williams song) =

Single by Andy Williams
- A-side: "The Peking Theme (So Little Time)"
- Released: June 1963
- Genre: Vocal
- Length: 2:40
- Label: Columbia 42784
- Songwriter(s): Alan Jeffreys, Doc Pomus
- Producer(s): Robert Mersey

Andy Williams singles chronology
"Days of Wine and Roses" (1963)	"Hopeless" (1963)	"The Peking Theme (So Little Time)" (1963)

"Hopeless" is a song written by Alan Jeffreys and Doc Pomus and performed by Andy Williams. The song reached #3 on the U.S. adult contemporary chart and #13 on the Billboard chart in 1963. The song's B-side, "The Peking Theme (So Little Time)", reached #115 on the Billboard Hot 100.
