= Unbelievable Uglies =

- Left to right: Dave Prentice, Dave Hoffman, Bob Eveslage, Gregory J. Paul, James Miller. Lakeside Pavilion, Barrett, MN. 2005 reunion tour

Background information
- Origin: Detroit Lakes, Minnesota
- Genres: Rock
- Years active: 1963–1972; 2005–present
- Labels: Music Masters Records, Cardinal Records; Soma Records, Liberty Records, Sound Records, UA Records
- Members: Dave Prentice; Gregory J. Paul; Bob Eveslage (Robby Jay); Jerry Uchanski; Paul Lidstrom
- Past members: Dave Hoffman (Winston Fink); Mike Gilson; Al Spears; Mike Shannon
- Website: www.unbelievableuglies.com

The Unbelievable Uglies are a rock and soul and rhythm and blues show band that formed in Detroit Lakes, Minnesota in 1963. The original members were Dave Hoffman (Winston Fink) on vocals and upright bass, frontman Dave Prentice on guitar, Gregory J. Paul on lead guitar, Bob Eveslage (Robby Jay) on vocals and keyboards, and Mike Shannon on drums.

== History ==
With raucous, unpredictable live sets, the group became popular in the upper Midwest. In 1964 issued their debut single "Judy Angel", backed with "The Log", on the Music Masters label.

Soon after this Bob Eveslage left the band and moved to Seattle. He issued a solo single, "The Days When I Knew Judy", on Jerry Dennon's Panorama label, under the name "Robbie Jay". Bob Eveslage moved back to Minnesota and rejoined the Uglies in January 1967. The band members at this time were Dave Hoffman (Winston Fink), Dave Prentice, Al Spears, Gregory J. Paul, Mike Shannon, Paul Lidstrom and Bob Eveslage. The Unbelievable Uglies were awarded the NBOA (National Ballroom Owners Association) award three years in a row.

== Record contract ==
The Unbelievable Uglies released "Off My Hands" on Cardinal records, and soon after signed to Soma records with their single release "Keep Her Satisfied." Their singles enjoyed enough regional airplay to land the group a deal with Liberty, and early in 1967 they released their major-label debut "Sorry", produced by Bobby Vee. Soon after this the Uglies released the Spears-Eveslage composition "Spider-Man." In November 1967 the band was the opening act for the Fargo, North Dakota appearance of The Who on the opening night of their first United States tour. The show made national headlines when the mayor of Fargo accused The Who and The Unbelievable Uglies of inciting the teen audience to riot, and banned them from ever appearing in his city again. This ban was lifted a short time later, and The Unbelievable Uglies continued to play shows in Fargo.

Other recordings were "I Ain't Gonna Eat Out My Heart Anymore" with Winston on vocals, "The Tin Drum", and a successful cover of Spirit's "Mister Skin", among others. Dale Sheldon joined the band for about three months in 1968, when the original drummer decided to tour Europe for the summer.

In 1972 the founding members of the original Unbelievable Uglies each decided to take on individual projects. Over the next several years three other area bands performed as the "Uglies". The most successful version being Mike Bullock, James Klein, Mike Stice, Larry Stock, Tom Carvell & Andy Baily from 1972-1979 when it disbanded after Mike Bullock and James Klein left the band and formed The Michael James Band.

== Reunion ==
In 2005, the original members of the Uglies were inducted into the Rock and Country Hall of Fame in Medina, Minnesota. They reunited and began performing as "The Original Unbelievable Uglies". A CD of newly written and recorded material was released, and the band did a regional tour in support of their first new recording in over three decades. Winston joined the rest of the original Uglies onstage during the summer of 2005 for a number of successful shows, but in the fall of 2005 he suffered a major stroke and was unable to perform onstage again. He continued to work behind the scenes assisting with booking, songwriting, recording and producing the band.

Dave Hoffman died on New Year's Day, 2008, and Al Spears died a few months earlier. Mike Shannon, the band's original drummer, died in 1999. Today the band continues to play reunion shows with Jerry Uchanski on vocals and guitar, Gregory J. Paul on lead guitar, Paul Lidstrom on bass and Bob Eveslage (Robby Jay) on keyboards and vocals. Dave Prentice joins the band onstage when his schedule permits.

In addition to the original Unbelievable Uglies 2006 self-titled CD, recent compilation appearances include The Lost Generation, Vol. 2, Mondo Frat Dance Bash a Go Go, and The Big Hits of Mid-America: The Soma Records Story.
