= Gretta Taylor =

- Born: Port of Spain, Trinidad and Tobago
- Education: University of Toronto (M.A. in Medieval Studies); St. Godric's College (Bilingual Secretarial Studies); University of the West Indies (Dip.Ed)
- Alma mater: St. Rose's school St. Joseph's Convent
- Occupations: musician teacher
- Parents: Dr. Aldwin Gerard Francis (father); Lorna Kilgour Francis (mother)

Gretta Taylor (née Francis) is a musician and teacher from Trinidad and Tobago. She is the conductor and musical director of The Marionettes Chorale (1974–present). She received the Hummingbird Medal—Gold in 1990 for "outstanding services to music and culture in Trinidad and Tobago", and a Port of Spain City Day Mayoral Award for "contribution to culture" in 2018.

== Early life and education ==
Taylor (M.A., Dip Ed., H.B.M. Gold) was born in Port of Spain, Trinidad, to Dr. Aldwin Gerard Francis and magistrate Lorna Kilgour Francis. Taylor attended St. Rose's school and then St. Joseph's Convent (both in Port of Spain), and received a Bachelor of Arts in French, Spanish and Philosophy and a Master of Arts in Medieval Studies (French & Spanish) from the University of Toronto (Canada). She completed a Bilingual Secretarial Studies course at St. Godric's College in London, England; and a Diploma in Education (Dip.Ed) from the University of the West Indies, St. Augustine (UWI).

Taylor studied piano and choral conducting under Douglas Bodle, Walter Buczynski (Canada), and Daphne Clifford (Trinidad) and completed courses in London, England, at the Hereford Summer School of Music and the Talbot Lampson School for Choral Conductors & Accompanists, where she won the Richard Wood Award. She has been member of the Association of British Choral Directors (ABCD) and the American Choral Directors Association (ACDA), and has attended its biennial conventions since 1993.

== Teaching career ==
She returned to Trinidad after touring with the University of Toronto choir (including a performance at the 1st International Choral Festival, at Lincoln Center in New York City, USA). She took up a position as a teacher at St. Joseph's Convent (Port of Spain), teaching French and Spanish (Forms 1–6); General Paper (GP); and Music. She accompanied and then directed the school's choirs, 1975–85, and 1990–94. During her tenure, the senior choir and its members won several prizes at the Music Festival for solo, ensemble and choral singing, including the Prime Minister's Trophy for Most Outstanding Junior Choir of the festival. She also led a mixed school choir to the Youth Choral and Dance Festival in Vienna. In 2005, she was inducted into St. Joseph's Convent's Hall of Excellence.

After taking early retirement in 1994, she served as the music director at Maria Regina Preparatory School until 2004, and volunteers with primary and secondary school choirs, including Sacred Heart Girls. She has judged National Calypso Monarch Finals (both junior and senior), the Teen Talent and Twelve & Under competitions, and the T&T Music Festival, where she also donated the Gretta Taylor Trophy to the Music Festival for the Girls Vocal Solo, 13–15 years.

== Musical direction of the Marionettes Chorale ==
Taylor was a singing member of The Marionettes Chorale for eight years before being elected as conductor and musical director in 1974. She founded the Marionettes Youth Chorale in 1995, which comprises young adults from over 30 national schools, and the Children's Choir in 2012, and leads all three groups in a volunteer capacity.

Taylor has described her approach to repertoire: "We are extremely proud of our calypso and steelband traditions, and regularly adapt them for the choir. But we also want to show local and international audiences the vast range of talents and traditions that we have in the Caribbean. We want to move audiences with classic choral music and our own traditional music, and do both equally well in the same programme.”

A 1999 issue of Caribbean Beat described Taylor's approach to leadership: "Conductor Gretta Taylor – who has just completed 25 years as director – works her choirs very hard. She demands the same high technical standards as a choral conductor would in London, New York or Berlin – the same rigorous, relentless attention to breathing, voice production, phrasing, blending, tuning, developing the right style for the work in hand. Nobody is immune to her sharp tongue. But if she works her singers hard, she works herself harder: virtually all her spare time is spent searching for material, planning programmes, planning stage placements and movements, keeping up with choral techniques and new music (not least by attending events like the American Choral Conductors’ Convention), making her own musical arrangements, rehearsing soloists ... But the fact that audiences come back year after year shows that the Marionettes have hit a good balance between challenge and entertainment. This sensitive balance is vital if the choir is to keep audiences pleased and entertained without compromising musical integrity. It's the same with the singers ... The choir itself has progressed too over the years, not just in musical professionalism and sophistication: it has become less austere and defensive about its music, it is projecting better, it has freed up."

Taylor has led the choir on several international tours, which have included competing in major international choral festivals and performing in locations like St. Martin-in-the-Fields (London) and Carnegie Hall (New York). The Chorale also placed 2nd in several international competitions in the following categories: Madrigal Choirs, Cork International Choral and Dance Festival (Ireland, 1984); Mixed Choirs, Cork International Choral and Dance Festival (Ireland, 1984); Mixed Choirs, Middlesbrough International Choral Festival (England, 1992).

Writing in the Yorkshire Evening Press during the choir's 1992 tour of the United Kingdom, journalist Martin Dreyer wrote about Taylor's musical direction: "The morning after the night before, there is still a smile on my face, put there by the five dozen members of the amazing Marionettes Chorale and their six-piece band. No praise can be high enough for their musical director, Gretta Taylor. The entire evening was sung by heart, from the heart. With a refreshing restraint in gestures that was almost self-effacing, she yet lovingly moulded every note. The choir responded with undivided attention and impeccable diction."

Under her stewardship, the Marionettes Chorale has also won the Hummingbird Medal — Gold for outstanding contribution to music in Trinidad & Tobago (1987); the Port of Spain Corporation Achievement Award for sterling contribution to the field of music (1999); a Trinidad & Tobago Icon (History Makers) Award for distinguished service to Trinidad & Tobago (2002); the Trinidad & Tobago IBC Inc. (Independence Ball Committee, Miami) Award for Outstanding Contribution to the Arts and Culture of the Republic of Trinidad & Tobago (2006); a Queen's Hall Award for Contribution to the Performing Arts (2009); The Archbishop Anthony Pantin Award in celebration of the 50th anniversary of Trinidad & Tobago's independence in the category of Music & the Creative Arts (2012); and the Nation Medal of Honour (Gold) for Music, Child Development, and Public Service from the Dr Eric Williams, TC Memorial Committee (2019).

== Awards and recognition ==
Taylor competed regularly in the Trinidad & Tobago Music Festival in the Piano Solo, Piano Duet, Piano Duo, Sight Reading and Lieder classes between 1954 and 1976, and as a choral director and vocal coach with the Marionettes Chorale and St. Joseph's Convent (Port of Spain). The Marionettes Chorale also competed at international choral festivals in 1984 and 1992 (see previous section). Taylor has also won two national awards.

National Awards

- Hummingbird Medal — Gold for Outstanding Contribution to Culture (1990)
- Port of Spain City Day Mayoral Award for Culture (2018)

Music Prizes include:

- Piano Duet Under 18 with Shiela Mae Bodden (1960)
- Piano Duet (two on one) & Piano Duo (two pianos) with Susan David Dore (1968, 1974, 1976)
- Ladies’ Vocal Trio with Susan David Dore & Judy Hernandez (1970)
- Norah Grant Trophy for Leider with Bernadette Laughlin Scott (1974)
- Trinidad Guardian Cup for Best Open Piano Duet with Susan David Dore (1974 & 1976)
