= She'll Never Know =

- German release picture sleeve

Single by Brenda Lee
- A-side: "Your Used to Be"
- Released: January 1963
- Genre: Pop
- Length: 2:37
- Label: Decca 31454
- Songwriter(s): Rick Hall

Brenda Lee singles chronology
"All Alone Am I" (1962)	"She'll Never Know" (1963)	"Losing You" (1963)

"She'll Never Know" is a song written by Rick Hall and performed by Brenda Lee. The song reached #15 on the adult contemporary chart and #47 on the Billboard Hot 100 in 1963.
