= Aldwin Gerard Francis =

Trinidadian doctor and sportsman

Aldwin Gerard Francis (16 October 1898 – 22 May 1974) was a doctor, sportsman, and sports administrator from Trinidad and Tobago. He was awarded the Trinidad and Tobago Chaconia Medal (Gold) for Medicine and Public Service in 1971, and was inducted into the St. Mary’s College Hall of Fame in 1999.

== Early life and education ==
He was born on 16 October 1898 to William and Mathilda Francis. He was one of five children (three boys — Hubert, Aldwin, and Winston — and two girls (Williana and Neutris); and had one more half sister, Wilhelmena.

He was a government exhibitioner to Saint Mary's College, Trinidad and Tobago where he won an Island Scholarship in 1918. In 1925, he earned his MB BCh BAO (Bachelor of Medicine, Bachelor of Surgery, and Bachelor of Obstetrics) from the National University of Ireland and his LM (Licentiate in Medicine and Surgery) from Coombe Women & Infants University Hospital in Dublin. He returned to the National University to earn the Doctor of Medicine (MD) qualification in 1934.

== Medicine and the public service ==
Upon returning to Trinidad, he worked in private practice in San Fernando for 15 months before joining the Government Medical Service. He served as District Medical Officer in almost every district of Trinidad — including the leprosarium operated on Chachacare island — as well as in Plymouth, Tobago. He spent the majority of his medical career at the Port of Spain General Hospital, where he was appointed Medical Officer Grade A in 1944, and Senior Physician in 1948.

He developed a reputation as an Internal Medicine specialist, with significant experience in children’s diseases, and was widely regarded as a "brilliant diagnostician"." For many years, he was Honorary Secretary of the Medical Board of Trinidad and Tobago, served on the Antibiotic Committee, and advocated for better training and working conditions for nurses. He served as a member of the Nursing Council of T&T from inception in 1950, as well as on the Board of Inquiry into the Registration of Nurses, and was the founder and for many years the editor of the Student Nurses Magazine. He was also the President of Corpus Christi Day Nursery.

Francis served as Vice President and later President (1951) of the Civil Service Association; was a member of the Public Service Commissions (1953–56, and 1959–61); and served on the Whitley Council. He made a brief foray into politics, serving as the President of the Party of Political Progress Groups or (POPPG), founded by Albert Gomes in 1950, and making an unsuccessful run for office with the party in 1956. He was a management committee member of the St. Mary’s College Past Students Union, serving on the same executive as Captain Arthur Andrew Cipriani in 1934.

After retiring from full-time government service, he joined the staff at the St. Ann’s Hospital in 1958 on a part-time basis as Physician and Staff Medical Officer. He served in this capacity until shortly before his death.

According to the Caribbean Medical Journal: "His clinical ability and diagnostic skill are recorded in many issues of the Journal. He was one of a triumvirate who laid the foundations of clinical medicine at the Colonial Hospital, now General Hospital, Port of Spain. He always found time to assist the student nurses both at work and when off duty. It was through his instrumentality that a club was formed by the student nurses. The club produced Nursing Journal, arranged concerts, etc. His arduous duties as President of the Civil Service Association will always be remembered with gratitude. He was a keen sportsman; cricket, bridge and chess were his hobbies."

== Contributions to sport ==
Francis was an avid sportsman, referee and sports administrator. As an athlete, he captained school cricket and football teams at St. Mary’s College and the National University of Ireland, and competed with the championship-winning Maple Club — of which he was a founder member, and which was "once regarded as "The Greatest" team ever to grace the soccer fields in Trinidad and Tobago [and] became the first league champions in 1927 in the Trinidad Amateur Football Association (TAFA) competition" (see also: List of Trinidad and Tobago football champions).

In addition, he was Island Chess Champion at the 1939 Trinidad and Tobago Chess Championship (also representing Trinidad at chess 1938 and 1948); Snooker Champion (1941); represented Trinidad in Inter-Colonial Cricket (1939); won the Open Doubles Tennis Champion (1946), and also won the Maple Club’s Men’s Doubles Lawn Tennis title of Maple Club with Alroy Nicholls in 1957. He also managed the Trinidad football team trip to Barbados (1944), and was a TAFA referee.

He was instrumental in forming the Bonanza Cricket League, Maple Club, and the Trinidad Cricket Council (which became the Trinidad and Tobago Cricket Board — the latter with Sir Errol Dos Santos, Sir Lindsay Grant, and Lord Learie Constantine in 1956. He served as President for a time with each organisation, holding the position at Maple Club from 1950 through 1964.

Upon his death, several articles appeared in the newspapers commenting on his contribution to sports. "He made a substantial contribution to our sport," wrote footballer and commentator Albert "Bootins" Alkins in his Trinidad Express column. Brunell Jones wrote in the Evening News: "The Bonanza era spawned a large army of knowledgeable men in cricket and Dr. Francis was among the best of them. He could smell a bad shot, a faulty bit of fielding or a bad ball a mile off, and he could write about the game." Sir Errol Dos Santos told the Trinidad Express: "Dr. Francis will be greatly missed. He was a great asset to the cricket world." In the Trinidad Guardian, Alvin Corneal wrote: "With his death there now appears a vacuum in the sporting world. It will be, of course, a long time before this vacuum is replaced."

== Awards and recognition ==
In 1971, he was awarded the nation’s second highest civilian honour: the Trinidad and Tobago Chaconia Medal (Gold) for Medicine and Public Service.

On his passing, the House of Representative held one minute’s silence to honour Sir Warner Boos (Chairman of the Public Service Association), Alderman Fitz Blackman (former Mayor of Port of Spain), and Dr. A.G. Francis. Tributes were paid by Kamaluddin Mohammed, Minister of Health & Leader of Government Business in the House, as well as by Opposition Leader Roy Richardson. The Trinidad and Tobago Medical Association cancelled its annual dinner as a mark of respect.

In 1999, Francis was inducted into the St. Mary’s College Hall of Fame.

== Personal life ==
He married Lorna Kilgour in 1940, and had three children (among them musician Gretta Taylor), and three grandchildren. There are references to him in several media with incorrect spelling, as Dr. Aldwyn Francis and Dr. Alwyn Francis.
