= The Moments (English band) =

The Moments were a rhythm and blues English group from London, England, formed in late 1963 by Steve Marriott at the age of 16, after giving up a promising early film acting career.

== Career ==
The Moments started out being called the Frantiks or the Frantik Ones, later changed to Steve Marriott and the Moonlights, and finally becoming the Moments. Due to Marriott's hyperactive nature, he had a habit of changing the group's name at this early time, until the success of later band Small Faces made it commercially unviable to do so any more. The original Frantiks line-up included Marriott, Johnny Herve, Tony McIntyre, Colin Green and Dennis Thompson. Marriott would sometimes have his girlfriend, English actress Adrienne Posta (whom he had met when they were pupils at the Italia Conti Academy), share vocals with him on duets. Their early musical style was heavily influenced by Buddy Holly, of whom Marriott was a big fan.

The Frantiks recorded a cover version of Cliff Richard's song "Move It" with former Shadows drummer Tony Meehan who was brought in to help with production. Despite the single being hawked around the major record companies no one was interested and the song was consequently never released. It was at this point that original members Dennis Thompson and Johnny Herve quit the group and Marriott changed the band's name to Steve Marriott and The Moments. The new line-up now had Barry Hewitt on bass, Tony McIntyre on drums, Steve Marriott on lead vocals and rhythm guitar, Johnny Weider (ex Johnny Kidd and the Pirates) on lead guitar and Allen Ellett on keyboards and vocals. They soon became more R&B influenced and found a manager, Tony Calder (who several years later established the Immediate label with Andrew Loog Oldham. The band were each earning a wage of £30 a week (£10 more than Marriott would later be paid by Don Arden in Small Faces).

The band performed concerts as often as six nights a week, including spots at the Flamingo and London's 100 Club. As a result, they achieved a loyal mod following; particularly around their hometown the East End of London and Essex. The band started to write their own material, a blend of soul with fast and furious R&B. Their next recording endeavour was called "A Touch of the Blues", written jointly by Marriott and Ellet, the song was in the same vein as the Dave Clark Five's hit at that time "Glad All Over" in that it had a heavy distinctive drum beat. Andrew Loog Oldham (ex Rolling Stones manager) who had seen the band play was impressed with Marriott's strong vocal performances, and produced the record, but for reasons unknown the recording has never seen the light of day. For a short period in March 1964 Marriott briefly changed the name of the band again, this time to the Wondering Ones, a month later he changed it back to The Moments this is noted by Mark Lewisohn who was the Beatles' chronicler. At a gig at the Albion in Rainham, Marriott first viewed his future Small Faces songwriting partner Ronnie Lane who was appearing with his band the Outcasts. In 1964 the Moments were asked by the World Artists label to provide a cover of the Kinks hit "You Really Got Me" for American release only, with a B-side "Money Money", but the song bombed and Marriott's fellow songwriter Ellet left the band.

In October 1964 the Moments told Marriott he was no longer wanted in the group, they wanted someone older to represent the band, and so Marriott was given his marching orders. Former member Ellet pointed out that the group were often called Steve Marriott's Moments making them appear as if they were just a backing band and this had started to grate on the other members and may have been a contributing factor in their decision.

The Moments never hit the big time, though original founding member Steve Marriott did, early the next year, 1965, with Small Faces.
