= Valley Concert Chorale =

Choir in Livermore, California

The Valley Concert Chorale is a choir composed of about 40 auditioned singers from Livermore, California, USA, and the surrounding Tri-Valley area, which is located in the San Francisco Bay Area. It usually performs three concerts each year, starting with a holiday concert in November, followed by a concert of serious music in March and a lighter concert in May. These concerts are often given in collaboration with other choruses in the area, including the San Francisco Concert Chorale, the Las Positas College Chamber Choir and the Cantabella Children's Chorus. Recently, the chorus has also organized an annual "sing-it-yourself" Messiah, which is held at Livermore's First Presbyterian Church.

The chorus was established in 1963 by Ellen Cunningham. Recent directors have included David Babbit and Philip Manwell. Since 1998, the chorus has been led by John Emory Bush, who is also the director of the San Francisco Concert Chorale, and has been director for the San Francisco Conservatory of Music, the College of Notre Dame in Belmont, California, and the Cathedral Church of Saint Matthew, Dallas, Texas. The chorus' accompanist is Daniel Glover, a concert pianist who has performed in 42 American states and 42 countries.

The chorus has a community outreach program, the most important part of which is a Music in the Schools program. This program was started in 1990. About ten members of the chorus present a short musical play to elementary schools in the area. These plays have included Hansel and Gretel, Tom Sawyer and several plays that were written by one of the troupe's members, Bobby Jensen. The scenery is painted by a local artist, Carolyn Ramsey, and the costumes and props are made by the members of the cast. Some students are selected to participate in the play and when it is over, all the students are given a chance to ask questions.

The chorus has made two CDs. The first, which consists of Christmas music, was recorded the Trinity Episcopal Church in San Francisco in 2003. The second CD, Carl Orff's Carmina Burana, was recorded at the Mission Dolores Basilica in San Francisco in 2006.
