= The Scorpions (Manchester band) =

Manchester band

The Scorpions are a 1960s British beat group, originally from Manchester in England, that became popular notably in the Netherlands. Their most important hit was "Hello Josephine", a song by Fats Domino.

== History ==
=== Beginnings ===
The band was started in 1960 and in the early days consisted of lead guitarist Tony Postill, his cousin Rodney on rhythm guitar, bass player Tony Brierley and Mike Delaney on drums. As teenage boys they would practice in Tony's bedroom but were in need of a frontman. As they searched for singer, Tony recalled an older boy at his school with a good singing voice, Pete Lewis, who he got in touch with and who agreed to join them. Although the band wasn't known in Manchester, they played in the famous Cavern Club in Liverpool, and feature on the Cavern Club's "Wall of Fame". They didn't release records in the UK. Just like many other British bands, The Scorpions tried their luck on the continent. Not in Germany or France, but in the Netherlands, where the market chances for the band were bigger.

=== In Netherlands ===
In Netherlands, the group were successful. Dutch booking agent Jan Vis arranged a series of gigs and producer Addy Kleijngeld arranged a Dutch recording contract at CNR. Their first single, a cover of Chuck Berry’s "Bye Bye Johnny" with "Rip It Up" on the flipside, was released in August 1964. It was not a success. However, CNR believed in the Scorpions and during that year they released three other singles. The third, "Hello Josephine", was their own version of Fats Domino's "My Girl Josephine". In the meantime, Brierley stepped out and Terry Morton became lead guitarist. Rodney Postill switched to bass guitar and cousin Tony Postill to rhythm guitar. "Hello Josephine" became a hit in Netherlands and reached the number two position in the Dutch Top 40 of offshore radio station Radio Veronica. Drummer Mike Delaney left the group in the beginning of 1965 and was replaced by Ian Lucas. The success of "Hello Josephine" justified the release of an LP, entitled Scorpions, which was released in mid-1965.

=== Problems ===
At that moment a difficult time started for the band. It was not easy to find a proper follow-up for "Hello Josephine". Although the ballad "Ann Louise" sold well, it could not compete with the success of "Hello Josephine". In addition, there were problems with the authorities. At that time there was no open European market and work permits for Englishmen were rather limited in Netherlands. The Scorpions were urged to return to Manchester, where hardly anybody knew them because CNR did not release records in the UK. Peter Lewis and Ian Lucas decided to return and recruited guitarist Graham Lee for lead guitar and backing vocals, Dave Vernon (bass) and Roy Smithson (organ). The first single in their new line-up, "Greensleeves" entered the charts.

There was a highlight for the band in October 1965; the Scorpions were one of the big names on the yearly TV-event called the Grand Gala du Disque. They performed two songs. Other artists on the show were The Everly Brothers, Dave Berry and The Supremes. Shortly after that, drummer Ian Lucas left the band and was replaced by Tom Unthank. The band found it difficult to promote themselves due to the difficulty in obtaining work permits and so gradually, the band's popularity waned. At the end of 1967, they returned to England. There was then an eleven-year gap before the band returned to Netherlands.

=== New success ===
Ten years later in 1977, former pirate station Radio Veronica became legal, and they broadcast a TV-marathon, The Day the Music Died. On a stage, built in the North Sea on the shore of Scheveningen, pop groups and singers of the 1960s would again perform with their biggest 1960s hits. The band at this time consisted of lead singer Peter Lewis, Graham Lee (lead guitar), Roy Smithson (piano), Tommy Unthank (drums) and Cedric Terry (bass). This gig had unexpected consequences: "Hello Josephine" again became a hit and reached the ninth position in the Dutch Top 40, which led to more gigs. New members then joined the band, Dave Robin (bass) and Max Hardy who replaced Unthank.

This new line-up recorded a new LP containing former songs as well as new ones. The group frequently toured in Netherlands until 1979.

Having been diagnosed with stomach cancer, Pete Lewis (the last remaining original band member) died at home in 1985. He was treated by Harold Shipman, nicknamed "Doctor Death" and was to be Harold Shipman's youngest victim.

== Members ==
=== Original band members ===
- Peter Lewis: lead vocals (born 31 December 1943 died 1 January 1985)
- Tony Brierley (Anthony Brierley): lead guitar (born 1944)
- Tony Postill (Anthony Harold Postill): lead and rhythm guitar (born 1944 died)
- Rodney Postill (Joseph Rodney Postill): rhythm and bass guitar (born 1942)
- Mike Delaney (Michael Delaney): drums (born 1945)

=== Subsequent band members ===
- Terence James Morton: lead guitar (born 1945 died 27 October 2021)
- Ian Lucas: drums (born 1945)
- Graham Lee (Graham Caunce Lee): lead guitar and vocals (born 22 May 1943)
- Dave Robin: bass
- Cedric Terry: bass
- Dave Vernon (David Frederick Vernon): bass (born 1942 died 24 October 2021)
- Tom Morgan: bass and vocals
- Martin Davies: bass and vocals
- Diccon Hubbard: bass and vocals
- Roy Smithson: piano, organ, keyboards and vocals (born c. 1945)
- Tommy Unthank: drums (born 1943)
- Max Hardy: drums

== Discography ==
=== Albums ===
- 1965: Hello Josephine
- 1965: Climbing the Charts
- 1966: Sweet and Lovely (repackage of Climbing the Charts)
- 1966: Keep In Touch with The Scorpions
- 1978: My Own Way to Rock

=== Singles ===
Year	Single	Chart Positions
Year	Single	NLD
1964	"Hello Josephine"	2
1964	"What Did I Say"	-
1964	"Johnny B. Goode"	-
1964	"Some Other Guy"	-
1964	"Bye Bye Johnny / Rip It Up"	-
1965	"Greensleeves / Hey Honey"	22
1965	"Ann Louise"	36
1965	"Balla Balla"	17

=== CDs ===
- 1997: The Scorpions
- 1998: Hello Josephine – The Complete Collection
- 2005: Hello Josephine/Climbing the Charts
- 2007: Now
