= The Marionettes Chorale =

The Marionettes Chorale of Trinidad and Tobago is one of the oldest performing arts organisations in the Caribbean. Formed in 1963, the choir has toured the Caribbean; North and Central America; and Great Britain; has won prizes at music festivals both in Trinidad & Tobago and internationally; has recorded seven albums; and received local awards. Founded in 1963 by Jocelyn Pierre and June Williams-Thorne, the choir has been led since 1974 by Gretta Taylor (née Francis) as conductor and artistic director; and founder member Joanne Mendes as secretary and production manager. Susan Dore (née David) served as assistant musical director 1974–2011, and was succeeded by Dr. Roger Henry. The choir has been sponsored by BP Trinidad & Tobago (then Amoco) since 1972, and formed a Youth Chorale in 1995 and a Children's Choir in 2012. The group was incorporated as a non-profit in 2005.

== History ==
The Marionettes was initially formed to compete in the 1964 Trinidad & Tobago Music Festival, and claims to be the first choir formed after the islands' independence in 1962. The group competed intermittently in the local Music Festival until 1980, and retired unbeaten. They were awarded the prize for the Most Outstanding Choir each time they competed, and other awards included the May Johnstone Commemorative Trophy for the Most Outstanding Performer of the Festival.

Between 1981 and 1992, the choir competed internationally at choral festivals in the United Kingdom: Llangollen, Wales (1981); Cork, Ireland (1984); and Middlesbrough, England (1992), winning four prizes. In addition to competitive tours, the Chorale also completed non-competitive tours in the Caribbean (Curaçao, Grenada, St Vincent, Barbados, Jamaica), and in North America and Central America (New York, Toronto, Montreal, Miami, Philadelphia Washington DC, and Costa Rica). The Marionettes have performed at venues including St Martin-in-the-Fields in London, the York Assembly Rooms, and the Hall of the Americas in Washington; and for dignitaries including Lord Browne and Colin Powell, delegates from CARICOM, the Organization of American States and the British Commonwealth.

In 1995, the choir founded a Youth Chorale for young singers aged 11–26, from over 30 local schools. The Youth Chorale is also supported by bpTT. In 2001, the Chorale began a fund-raising campaign to build its own rehearsal and performance hall, and formalised its status as a non-profit organisation in 2005.

The Chorale produces at least two major productions per year in Trinidad & Tobago, in the middle of the year and in December, usually at the Queen's Hall in Port of Spain. It also presents concerts in aid of local charities, and guests at local events. In 2008–09, it celebrated its 45th anniversary, and 35 years of leadership by Taylor, Dore and Mendes.

== Repertoire ==
The Marionettes' repertoire includes Western Classical music, opera, musical theatre, indigenous folk music, African-American spirituals, popular classics, and world music.

Composers who have dedicated works to the choir include Dr. Havelock Nelson, Stewart Hylton Edwards and Alma Pierre.

The Chorale was among the first to blend voices with the steel pan (aka steel drum) in the 1960s, and have performed with the following steel orchestras: Pan Am North Stars, Trinidad All Stars, Renegades, Renegades Youth Orchestra, Desperadoes and Skiffle Bunch. They have premiered several choral works in the Caribbean, including: Carmina Burana (Orff); Fanshawe's African Sanctus; Ralph Vaughan Williams' Five Mystical Songs, Benjamin Britten's Ceremony of Carols; Francis Poulenc's Gloria; Duke Ellington's Sacred Concerts and Leonard Bernstein's Missa Brevis and Chichester Psalms.

== Recordings ==
- To Music (LP, 1972)
- The Marionettes Live at Queen’s Hall (cassette, 1989)
- Voices & Steel, with All Stars Steel Orchestra (CD, 1995)
- A Christmas Album (CD, 1998)
- Good News (CD, 2002)
- Sing Noel (CD, 2007)
- Landmarks (CD, 2013)

== Tours ==
- 1965: Grenada; Barbados; and St Vincent
- 1967: Curaçao; Jamaica; New York, USA (United Nations); Toronto and Montreal, Canada (Carifta Expo '67)
- 1969: Grenada (Carifta Expo '69)
- 1981: London (Commonwealth Institute); Llangollen (International Eisteddfod, Wales) (United Kingdom)
- 1984: London, Cork (Cork International Choral Festival, Ireland)
- 1992: London (St Martin-in-the-Fields), Middlesbrough (International Choral Festival), York, Cambridge, Edinburgh, Glasgow (United Kingdom)
- 1997: Miami, Mansfield College (Pennsylvania), Philadelphia, Washington DC (Hall of the Americas), Princeton University, New York (Medgar Evers College) (United States of America)
- 2004: San Jose and Limón (Costa Rica)

== Prizes and awards ==
=== Awards ===
- Humming Bird Medal (Gold) for outstanding contribution to music in Trinidad & Tobago (1987)
- Keys to the City of Port of Spain (1992)
- Port of Spain Corporation Achievement Award for sterling contribution to the field of music (1999)
- Trinidad & Tobago Icon (History Makers) Award for distinguished service to Trinidad & Tobago (2002)
- Trinidad & Tobago IBC Inc. (Independence Ball Committee, Miami) Award for Outstanding Contribution to the Arts and Culture of the Republic of Trinidad & Tobago (2006)
- Queen's Hall Award for Contribution to the Performing Arts (2009)

=== Trinidad & Tobago Music Festival ===
- 1964: JCC Cup for Best Adult Choir
- 1966: JCC Cup for Best Adult Choir; Mary Elizabeth Evans Cup for Best Religious & Church Choir
- 1968: Mary Elizabeth Evans Cup for Best Religious & Church Choir; Merchants Trophy for Best Adult 'X' Class Choir; Olive Walke Shield for Best All Round Choir; Founder's Trophy (May Johnstone Commemoration Trophy) for Most Outstanding Performance of the Festival
- 1980: Ashdown Cup (Best religious open choir over 20 singers); Lion's Trophy (Most Outstanding Choir of the Festival); JCC Cup (Best Adult Choir)

=== International prizes ===
- Ruth Railton Prize for the most outstanding contribution by a visiting group at the Cork International Choral and Dance Festival (Ireland, 1984)
- 2nd place, Madrigal Choirs, Cork International Choral and Dance Festival (Ireland, 1984)
- 2nd place, Mixed Choirs, Cork International Choral and Dance Festival (Ireland, 1984)
- 2nd place, Mixed Choirs, Middlesbrough International Choral Festival (England, 1992)
