= ..."Let Me Sing" =

Studio album by Brenda Lee
- Released: December 9, 1963
- Recorded: August 20, 1961 – May 29, 1963
- Studio: Bradley Studios (Nashville, Tennessee)
- Label: Decca
- Producer: Owen Bradley

Brenda Lee chronology
All Alone Am I (1963)	..."Let Me Sing" (1963)	By Request (1964)

Singles from ..."Let Me Sing"
- 1. "Break It to Me Gently" Released: January 1962; 2. "Losing You" Released: April 1963

Professional ratings
Review scores
Source	Rating
AllMusic	3/5 stars
New Record Mirror	5/5 stars

..."Let Me Sing" is the ninth studio album by American singer Brenda Lee. The album was released December 9, 1963, on Decca Records and was produced by Owen Bradley. The album was the second and final album studio album released by Brenda Lee in 1963.

== Background and content ==
..."Let Me Sing" was recorded in five separate recording sessions between August 20, 1961, and May 29, 1963, at the Bradley Film and Recording Studio in Nashville, Tennessee, United States under the direction of producer Owen Bradley. ..."Let Me Sing" contained twelve tracks, like all of her previous albums, and many cover versions of pop songs and standards. The album remakes included "Night and Day" by Cole Porter, Bobby Darin's "You're the Reason I'm Living", "At Last" which was recently covered by Etta James, and "End of the World" by Skeeter Davis. Unlike Lee's previous release of 1963, ..."Let Me Sing" contained more recent cover versions of pop songs, mainly from the late 1950s and early 1960s. Greg Adams of AllMusic called the album's use of Pop standards to sound "fresh" unlike her prior releases. Adams reviewed the album and gave it three out of five stars. Adams stated, "..."Let Me Sing" manages to sound vital where very similar albums failed later in her career. Not surprisingly, Let Me Sing was also Lee's second-to-last Top 40 album." The album was originally released on a 33 1/3 rpm LP record upon its initial release, containing six songs on the "A-side" of the record and six songs on the "B-side" of the record. The album has since been reissued on a compact disc in both Paraguay and Japan.

== Release ==
..."Let Me Sing" released its first single over a year before its initial release. The first single, "Break It to Me Gently", was released in January 1962, peaking at number 4 on the Billboard Hot 100 and number 46 on the UK Singles Chart in the United Kingdom. Its second single "Losing You" was released one year later in April 1963. The single peaked at number 6 on the Billboard Hot 100, number 2 on the Billboard Easy Listening chart, and number 13 on the Billboard R&B chart. It became Lee's last single to chart on the R&B chart during her recording career. The single would also reach number 10 on the UK Singles Chart. The album was officially released on December 9, 1963, on Decca Records, later peaking at number 39 on the Billboard 200 albums chart.

== Track listing ==
Side one

1. "Night and Day" – (Cole Porter) 2:33
2. "End of the World" – (Sylvia Dee, Arthur Kent) 3:05
3. "Our Day Will Come" – (Mort Garson, Bob Hilliard) 2:32
4. "You're the Reason I'm Living" – (Bobby Darin) 2:24
5. "Break It to Me Gently" – (Diane Lampert, Joe Seneca) 2:35
6. "Where Are You?" – (Harold Adamson, Jimmy McHugh) 2:59

Side two

1. "When Your Lover Has Gone" – (Einar Aaron Swan) 2:09
2. "Losing You" – (Pierre Havet, Jean Renard, Carl Sigman) 2:28
3. "I Wanna Be Around" – (Johnny Mercer, Sadie Vimmerstedt) 2:07
4. "Out in the Cold Again" – (Rube Bloom, Ted Koehler) 3:08
5. "At Last" – (Mack Gordon, Harry Warren) 2:18
6. "There Goes My Heart" – (Benny Davis, Abner Silver) 2:47

== Personnel ==
- Brenton Banks – strings
- Harold Bradley – guitar
- Howard Carpenter – strings
- Floyd Cramer – piano
- Dottie Dillard – background vocals
- Ray Edenton – guitar
- Buddy Harman – drums
- Lillian Hunt – strings
- Anita Kerr – background vocals
- Douglas Kirkham – drums
- Brenda Lee – lead vocals
- Grady Martin – guitar
- Bob Moore – bass
- Louis Nunley – background vocals
- Boots Randolph – saxophone
- Vernel Richardson – strings
- Bill Wright – background vocals

== Sales chart positions ==
Album

Chart (1963)	Peak position
U.S. Billboard 200	39

Singles

Year	Song	Peak chart positions			
Year	Song	US	US AC	US R&B	UK
1962	"Break It to Me Gently"	4	—	—	46
1963	"Losing You"	6	2	13	10
"—" denotes releases that did not chart

== Release history ==
Release history and formats for ..."Let Me Sing"
Region	Date	Format	Label	Ref.
North America	December 9, 1963	Vinyl LP	Decca Records	
