= Lynching of Aaron and Anthony (Arkansas, 1856) =

Lynching of two Black men in Arkansas

Aaron, Anthony, and Randall were three enslaved Black men who died of racial terror in the United States. Aaron and Anthony were lynched in 1856 in Washington County, Arkansas, after being accused of a murder and released by the court, one because he was proven innocent and the other for lack of evidence. Randall was hanged for that crime. An oral history recounts that the white man who had been killed, the enslaver James Boone, had raped a black woman, who killed him in self-defense, after which the three men were implicated by Boone's family.

Aaron and Anthony, who were enslaved by James Boone (in Richland Township, near Elkins, Arkansas), were accused of having murdered him. Both men were tried on July 7, 1856, in the courthouse of Washington County. Anthony was proven innocent, and for Aaron there was no evidence to convict. A white mob kidnapped them from the courthouse, and lynched them. Later, on August 1, another enslaved man named Randall who had been convicted of that murder by an all-white jury, was hanged, probably at Fayetteville National Cemetery. An oral history, uncovered by a Washington County historian, explained that "on May 29, 1856, James Boone attempted to rape an enslaved Black woman who killed him in self-defense. The Boone family then implicated Aaron, Anthony and Randall in Boone's death."

A historical marker commemorating the murder was put up on May 15, 2021, as the result of a partnership between the Washington County Community Remembrance Project and Montgomery, Alabama's Equal Justice Initiative.
