= Hachidai Nakamura =

Japanese songwriter and pianist (1931–1992)

- Born: Hachidai Nakamura; January 20, 1931; Qingdao, Republic of China
- Origin: Japan
- Died: June 10, 1992 (aged 61)
- Genres: Pop, jazz
- Occupation: Composer
- Instrument: Piano
- Years active: 1953–1992

Hachidai Nakamura (中村 八大, Nakamura Hachidai; January 20, 1931 – June 10, 1992) was a Japanese songwriter and jazz pianist.

== Biography ==
Hachidai Nakamura was born in Qingdao, Republic of China, to Japanese parents, before moving to Kurume at a young age, where he attended high school. He graduated from Waseda University in Tokyo with a degree in literature. Nakamura extensively played piano during his high school days, where he was invited to perform with local dance band "Yasuhiko Taniguchi and Premier Swing", and "The Red Hat Boys", a student jazz combo.

After Nakamura entered Waseda University, he formed a jazz band named "Big Four" along with Hidehiko Matsumoto, Joji "George" Kawaguchi, and Mitsuru Ono in 1953, but the band was soon disbanded.

As a composer, Nakamura later wrote many songs for various Japanese singers such as Kyu Sakamoto, enka singer Saburō Kitajima, and Johnny & Associates' first group Johnnys. He worked closely with lyricist Rokusuke Ei and many of his songs were popularized by singer Kyu Sakamoto. He wrote the music of the popular Japanese song "Ue o muite arukō," released in 1961 in Japan. The song was released in the United States under the name "Sukiyaki" in 1963, peaking at the number-one position on the Billboard Hot 100. He and Ei also worked on the productions of Johnnys' 1964 debut single "Wakai Namida" and Saburō Kitajima's 1965 single "Kaerokana."

== Compositions ==
=== Kyu Sakamoto ===
- Ue o muite arukō (上を向いて歩こう)
- Ashita ga aru sa (明日があるさ)
- Hitoribotchi no futari (一人ぼっちの二人)
- Sayonara sayonara (さよならさよなら)
- Sekai no kuni kara konnichiwa (世界の国からこんにちは)
- Soshite omoide (そして想い出)
- Kuchibue dake ga (口笛だけが)
- Ikite ite yokatta (生きていてよかった)

=== Johnnys ===
- Wakai Namida (若い涙)

=== Saburō Kitajima ===
- Kaerokana (帰ろかな)
