= Ashita ga Arusa =

Song by Kyu Sakamoto
- Released: 1963

"Ashita ga aru sa" (Japanese: 明日があるさ; "There's always tomorrow") is a Japanese song that was performed by Japanese singer Kyu Sakamoto, with music by Hachidai Nakamura and lyrics by Yukio Aoshima. The song tells the story of a boy who meets a girl every day at a train station but is too afraid to confess his love to her. The song is written in a comical sense. When the song was released in Japan in 1963, it sold over 8 million records.

The song was covered by Re: Japan (special band of Yoshimoto Kogyo) and reached the number-one position on the Oricon charts in April 2001. The band Ulfuls covered the song, keeping with the comical procrastination theme, but with different lyrics that tell the story of an ambitious young man eager to be successful in business.

A TV drama series and movie using the same name were made by the Japanese comedy duo Downtown.

Preceded by "Ai no Bakayarō" by Maki Goto	Japanese Oricon Chart number one single April 16, 2001 (Re: Japan version)	Succeeded by "Pieces of a Dream" by Chemistry
