= Cardinal Records (1950s) =

Cardinal Records was an American record label based in Kansas City, Missouri. It was founded during the early 1950s by Louis Blasco, whose wife Betty Peterson Blasco was co-writer of the song "My Happiness" which was the initial reason for starting their music publishing company Blasco Music Inc. After Louis died in 1954, brother Frank took over running of the label and the publishing company while Betty took control of the song rights of "My Happiness"

The label is known mainly for recordings of the harmonica duo The Mulcays. Other artists were Hack Swain, Jon and Sondra Steele and The Philharmonics.

== See also ==
- List of record labels
- Cardinal Records (disambiguation)
