= The Philharmonics =

The Philharmonics were a versatile African-American vocal quintet from Springfield, Missouri who became successful despite origins in a then-racially-intolerant town and era. They were at their peak in the 1950s and performed across the United States. The group could adapt to many styles of music from gospel, rhythm and blues and pop to country and Western. They had splendid harmony, choreography, a colorful wardrobe and an impeccable stage presence.

The Philharmonics in the 1950s (l-r): Chick Rice, James Logan, Elbridge Moss, Homer Boyd and George Culp

The group was originally a quartet, composed of Homer "Jolly" Boyd (deceased), George Culp (bass), Elbridge "Old Man" Moss (deceased), and Clarence "Chick" Rice (baritone) (deceased). Joe Neal Hardin (deceased) was an earlier member. The group became a quintet with the addition of James Logan (tenor) (deceased).

Their roots were in gospel music. Moss, from Kentucky, performed with vocal groups during his World War II service in the US Army. Upon discharge, he visited his brother in Springfield, met and married a local girl, and moved to the town in the mid-1940s. He met the others in the choir at Gibson Chapel Church where they performed with pianist Florence Sample Thompson. Boyd was 17 and in high school when he joined.

In the early 1950s, the group won twice on a talent show on CBS-TV, The Original Youth Opportunity Program, hosted by Horace Heidt, which showcased young performers from across the country. They also toured with the show.

The Philharmonics, nicknamed the Phils, were regularly featured on ABC's nationally broadcast television show, Ozark Jubilee, from 1955 to 1960 and provided background vocals for many of the country music stars on the program. They also appeared on ABC's The Eddy Arnold Show in 1956, and briefly had their own show on Springfield's KYTV-TV. They recorded on the Cardinal Records label. Their singles included "Teen Town Hop" and "That's Why I'm Losing You", both written by Moss.

Boyd and Culp performed at the 2007 Ozarks Celebration Festival at Missouri State University. In 2008, the group was honored with a star on the Missouri Walk of Fame in Marshfield.
