= Minsky =

Minsky (Belarusian: Мінскі; Russian: Минский) is a family name originating in Eastern Europe, related to the city of Minsk.

== People ==
- Hyman Minsky (1919–1996), American economist
- Marvin Minsky (1927–2016), American cognitive scientist in the field of Artificial Intelligence
- Michael Minsky (1918–1988), Russian opera singer
- Morton Minsky (1902–1987), burlesque theater owner
- Nikolai Minsky (1855–1937), Russian poet
- Richard Minsky (born 1947), American scholar of bookbinding
- Richard Allen Minsky (born 1944), American convicted criminal
- Terri Minsky, American television writer and producer
- Minsky Malone, an Australian director and a burlesque performer

== Other uses ==
- Minsky's Burlesque, a brand of American burlesque, 1912–1937
- The Night They Raided Minsky's, a 1968 film
  - Minsky's, a musical play loosely based on the film
- Minsky (economic simulator), an open source visual computer program for dynamic modelling of monetary economies.
- Minsky moment, a business cycle theory

== See also ==
- Minsk, Belarus
