= John C. Reilly filmography =

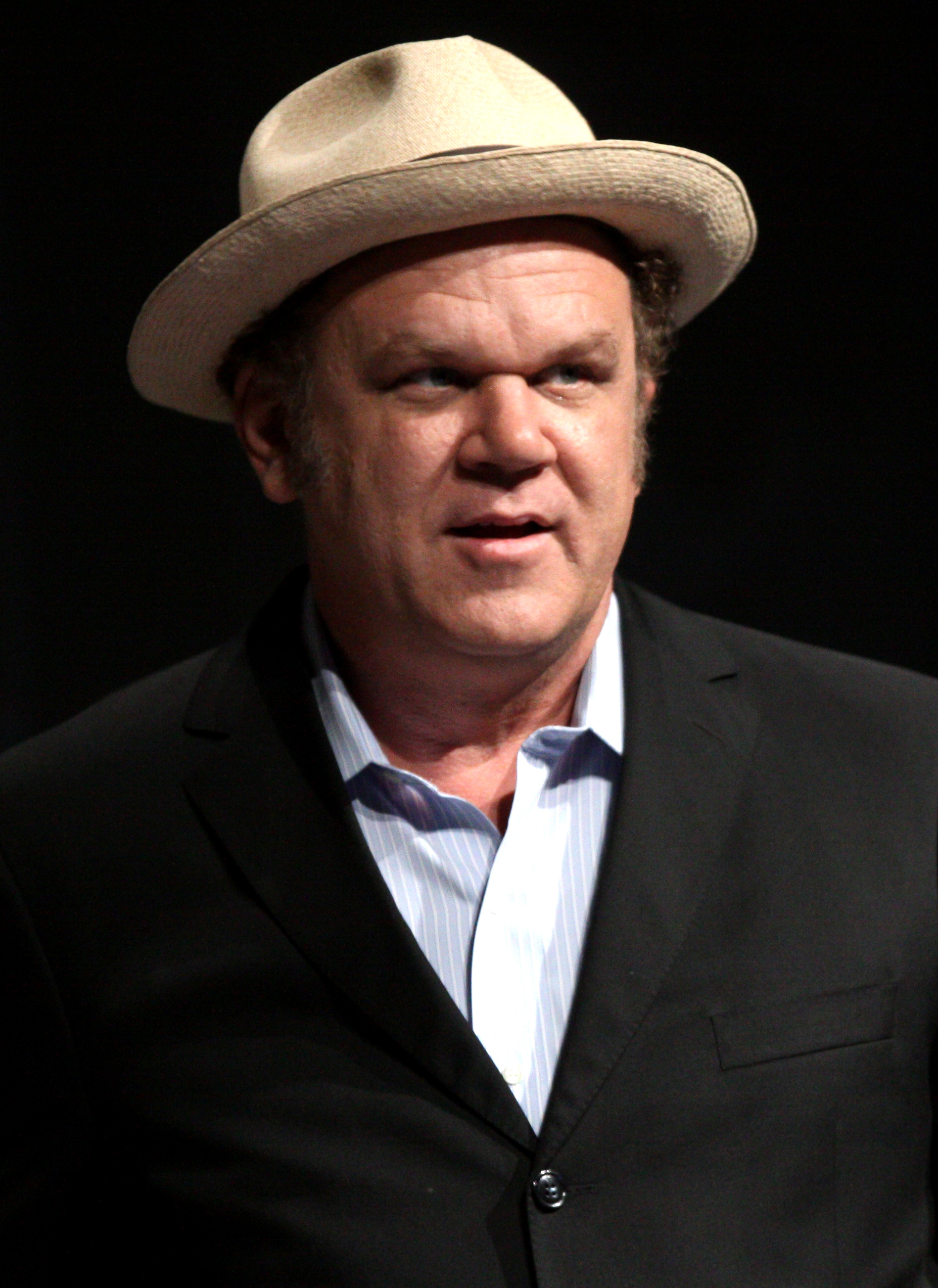
Reilly at the 2012 San Diego Comic-Con

John C. Reilly is an American actor and writer. After his film debut Above the Law, he gained exposure through supporting roles for Days of Thunder, What's Eating Gilbert Grape and The River Wild. Reilly collaborated with Paul Thomas Anderson on several films, including Hard Eight, Boogie Nights, and Magnolia. For his role in Chicago, Reilly was nominated for the Academy Award for Best Supporting Actor and the corresponding Golden Globe Award. He worked with director Martin Scorsese on both Gangs of New York and The Aviator. He starred in the comedy Walk Hard: The Dewey Cox Story, garnering him a Grammy Award nomination and two Golden Globe Award nominations for his performance and the song performed in the film, "Walk Hard". Reilly starred with Will Ferrell in Talladega Nights and Step Brothers. He voiced the title character in the commercially successful animated films Wreck-It Ralph and Ralph Breaks the Internet. Reilly starred as the titular role in the television series Check It Out! with Dr. Steve Brule, a character that originated on Tim and Eric Awesome Show, Great Job!

== Film ==
Year	Title	Role	Notes
1988	Above the Law	Thug In Bar	
1989	Casualties of War	PFC Herbert Hatcher	
1989	We're No Angels	Young Monk	
1990	Days of Thunder	Buck Bretherton	
1990	State of Grace	Stevie McGuire	
1991	Shadows and Fog	Cop at Police Station	
1992	Out on a Limb	Jim Jr.	
1992	Hoffa	Petey Connelly	
1993	What's Eating Gilbert Grape	Tucker Van Dyke	
1994	The River Wild	Terry	
1995	Dolores Claiborne	Const. Frank Stamshaw	
1995	Georgia	Herman	
1996	Hard Eight	John Finnegan	
1996	Boys	Officer Kellogg Curry	
1997	Boogie Nights	Reed Rothchild	Also songwriter
1997	Chicago Cab	Steve	
1998	The Thin Red Line	Sgt. Storm	
1999	The Settlement	Pat	
1999	Never Been Kissed	Augustus Strauss	
1999	For Love of the Game	Gus Sinski	
1999	Magnolia	Jim Kurring	
2000	The Perfect Storm	Dale 'Murph' Murphy	
2001	The Anniversary Party	Mac Forsyth	
2001	Frank's Book	Frank	Short film
2002	The Good Girl	Phil Last	
2002	Gangs of New York	Happy Jack	
2002	Chicago	Amos Hart	
2002	The Hours	Dan Brown	
2003	Piggie	Russell	
2004	The Aviator	Noah Dietrich	
2004	Criminal	Richard Gaddis	
2005	Are You the Favorite Person of Anybody?	Man With Survey	Short film
2005	Dark Water	Mr. Cory Murray	
2006	A Prairie Home Companion	Lefty	
2006	Talladega Nights: The Ballad of Ricky Bobby	Cal Naughton, Jr.	
2007	Year of the Dog	Albert "Al"	
2007	Walk Hard: The Dewey Cox Story	Dewford "Dewey" Cox	Also executive soundtrack producer and songwriter
2008	The Promotion	Richard Wehlner	
2008	Step Brothers	Dale Doback	Co-wrote the story with Adam McKay and Will Ferrell
2009	9	5	Voice role
2009	Cirque du Freak: The Vampire's Assistant	Larten Crepsley	
2010	The Extra Man	Gershon	
2010	Cyrus	John	
2011	Cedar Rapids	Dean Ziegler	
2011	We Need to Talk About Kevin	Franklin	
2011	Terri	Mr. Fitzgerald	
2011	Carnage	Michael	
2012	Tim and Eric's Billion Dollar Movie	Taquito	
2012	Wreck-It Ralph	Wreck-It Ralph	Voice role; Additional story material
2013	Anchorman 2: The Legend Continues	The Ghost of Stonewall Jackson	Uncredited cameo
2014	Bears	Narrator	Documentary
2014	Life After Beth	Maury Slocum	
2014	Guardians of the Galaxy	Corpsman Rhomann Dey	
2015	Entertainment	Cousin John	
2015	The Lobster	Lisping Man	
2015	Tale of Tales	King of Longtrellis	
2015	The Cowboys	L'Américain	
2015	When Marnie Was There	Kiyomasa Oiwa	Voice role; English dub
2015	View from a Blue Moon	Narrator	Documentary
2016	Sing	Eddie Noodleman	Voice role
2017	The Little Hours	Father Tommasso	
2017	Kong: Skull Island	Hank Marlow	
2018	The Sisters Brothers	Eli Sisters	Producer
2018	Stan & Ollie	Oliver Hardy	
2018	Ralph Breaks the Internet	Wreck-It Ralph	Voice role
2018	Holmes & Watson	John Watson	
2021	Licorice Pizza	Fred Gwynne	Uncredited
2021	O Night Divine	Kristof	Short film
2022	Stars at Noon	American Magazine Editor	
2023	Once Upon a Studio	Wreck-It Ralph	Voice role; Short film
2024	An Almost Christmas Story	The Folk Singer	Voice role; Short film
2025	Heads or Tails?	Buffalo Bill	
2026	A Prayer for the Dying	Doc	
2026	DreamQuil	Gary	
2026	How to Rob a Bank	Agent West	
TBA	Sponsor †	Jerry	Filming

== Television ==
Year	Title	Role	Notes
1993	Fallen Angels	Martin Lonsdale	Episode: "The Frightening Frammis"
1999	Tenacious D	Sasquatch	Episode: "Death of a Dream"
2004	Cracking Up	Steve Evers	Episode: "Prom Night"
2005	Kathy Griffin: My Life on the D-List	Himself, Guest Star	Episode: "Out & About"
2006	Tom Goes to the Mayor	John (voice)	Episode: "Friendship Alliance"
2006	Saturday Night Live	Host	Episode: "John C. Reilly/My Chemical Romance"
2007–2010	Tim and Eric Awesome Show, Great Job!	Dr. Steven Brule	25 episodes, plus two specials
2008	The Simpsons	Himself (voice)	Episode: "Any Given Sundance"
2010–2011	Funny or Die Presents	John / Nikola Tesla	2 episodes
2010–2016	Check It Out! with Dr. Steve Brule	Dr. Steve Brule	Also co-creator, writer and executive producer
2014	Tim and Eric's Bedtime Stories	Jordan	Episode: "Baby"
2014–2015	Stone Quackers	Officer Barry (voice)	12 episodes; Also executive producer
2015	Bagboy	Dr. Steve Brule	Television special; Also writer and executive producer
2020	Moonbase 8	Robert "Cap" Caputo	6 episodes; Also co-creator, writer and executive producer
2022–2023	Winning Time: The Rise of the Lakers Dynasty	Jerry Buss	17 episodes

== Theater ==
Dates	Title	Role	Playwright	Venue	Production	Ref.
1988	The Grapes of Wrath	Noah	Frank Galati	Steppenwolf Theatre Company	Chicago	
2000	True West	Austin / Lee	Sam Shepard	Circle in the Square Theatre	Broadway	
2002–2003	Marty	Marty Piletti	Rupert Holmes	Huntington Theatre Company	Boston	
2005	A Streetcar Named Desire	Stanley Kowalski	Tennessee Williams	Studio 54	Broadway	
2012	8	David Blankenhorn	Dustin Lance Black	Wilshire Ebell Theatre	Los Angeles (Note: stage reading)	
2027	The Odd Couple	Oscar Madison	Neil Simon	Stephen Sondheim Theatre	Broadway	

== Other media ==
Music videos
Year	Title	Performer(s)	Role
1998	"Across the Universe"	Fiona Apple	Jukebox Thief
1998	"Talk About The Blues"	Jon Spencer Blues Explosion	Russell Simins
1999	"Save Me"	Aimee Mann	Officer Jim Kurring
2006	"Chuck Norris"	Supafloss	Himself
2008	"Boats 'N Hoes"	Himself and Will Ferrell	Dale Doback
2011	"Make Some Noise"	Beastie Boys	Future Mike D
2014	"HAM"	Mr. Oizo	Father
2017	"Pillow Talking"	Lil Dicky	God
2025	"Archbishop Harold Holmes"	Jack White	Archbishop Harold Holmes

Web
Year	Title	Role	Notes
2008	Green Team	Jim Smegg	Video short
2010	Peace on Earth/Little Drummer Boy	Bing Crosby	Video short
2016	Pound House	Fish Man	Episode: "Fish Man"
