= List of awards and nominations received by John C. Reilly =

John C. Reilly awards and nominations
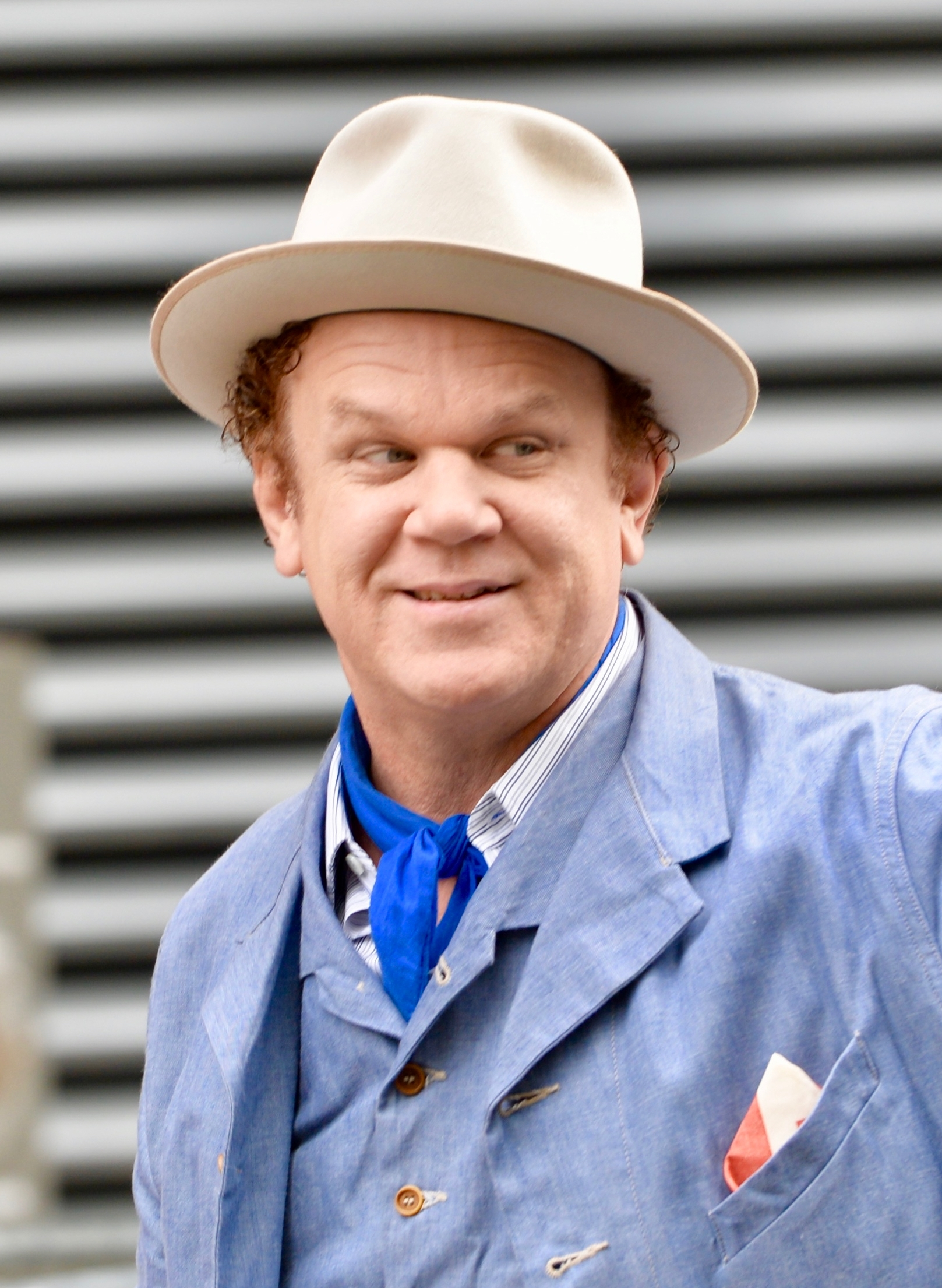
- Reilly in 2018
Awards and nominations
Award	Wins	Nominations
Academy Awards	0	1
Actor Awards	1	5
Critics' Choice	1	1
Emmy Awards	0	1
Golden Globe Awards	0	3
Grammy Award	0	1
Tony Awards	0	1

Totals (Note: Certain award groups do not simply award one winner. They acknowledge several different recipients, have runners-up, and have third place. Since this is a specific recognition and is different from losing an award, runner-up mentions are considered wins in this award tally. For simplification and to avoid errors, each award in this list has been presumed to have had a prior nomination.)
- Wins: 10
- Nominations: 40

This is a list of awards and nominations received by John C. Reilly

John C. Reilly is an American actor, comedian, singer, voice actor, screenwriter, and producer. He started his career as a character actor before transitioning to leading roles on stage and screen. Reilly has received an Actor Award and a Critics' Choice Award as well as nominations for an Academy Award, a Emmy Award, three Golden Globe Awards, a Grammy Award, four Independent Spirit Awards and a Tony Award.

Reilly became known for his collaborations with filmmaker Paul Thomas Anderson including for his roles as an adult film star in Boogie Nights (1997) and an earnest police officer in Magnolia for which he was nominated for the Actor Award for Outstanding Performance by a Cast in a Motion Picture. He portrayed a simple minded but devoted husband in the Rob Marshall directed musical adaptation Chicago (2002) for which he was nominated for the Academy Award for Best Supporting Actor, the Golden Globe Award for Best Supporting Actor – Motion Picture and a win for the Actor Award for Outstanding Performance by a Cast in a Motion Picture. He played a film director in The Anniversary Party (2002) and a well-meaning retail worker in The Good Girl (2003), both of which earned him nominations for the Independent Spirit Award for Best Supporting Male.

He played a World War II veteran in the period drama The Hours (2002) and Noah Dietrich in the historical epic The Aviator (2004) both of which earned him nominations for the Actor Award for Outstanding Performance by a Cast in a Motion Picture. He took a comedic role as a rock singer in the musical comedy satire Walk Hard: The Dewey Cox Story (2005) for which he was nominated for the Golden Globe Award for Best Actor in a Motion Picture – Musical or Comedy and the Grammy Award for Best Song Written for Visual Media for the title song "Walk Hard". He played a lonely divorce who gets involved in a relationship with a woman and her overprotective son in Cyrus (2010) and an insurance salesman in the comedy Cedar Rapids (2011) both of which earned him Independent Spirit Award nominations.

He portrayed silent film comedian Oliver Hardy in the dramedy Stan & Ollie (2018) earning a nomination for the Golden Globe Award for Best Actor in a Motion Picture – Musical or Comedy. On stage, he played dual roles of Austin and Lee in the Broadway revival of the Sam Shepard play True West (2005). He was nominated for the Children's and Family Emmy Award for Outstanding Voice Performer for the David Lowry directed and Alfonso Cuaron produced short film An Almost Christmas Story (2024).

== Major associations ==
=== Academy Awards ===
Year	Category	Nominated work	Result	Ref.
2002	Best Supporting Actor	Chicago	Nominated	

=== Actor Awards ===
Year	Category	Nominated work	Result	Ref.
1997	Outstanding Cast in a Motion Picture	Boogie Nights	Nominated	
1999	Outstanding Cast in a Motion Picture	Magnolia	Nominated	
2002	Outstanding Cast in a Motion Picture	Chicago	Won	
2002	Outstanding Cast in a Motion Picture	The Hours	Nominated	
2004	Outstanding Cast in a Motion Picture	The Aviator	Nominated	

=== Critics' Choice Awards ===
Year	Category	Nominated work	Result	Ref.
2002	Best Acting Ensemble	Chicago	Won	

=== Emmy Awards ===
Year	Category	Nominated work	Result	Ref.
Children's and Family Emmy Awards
2025	Outstanding Single Voice Role Performer	An Almost Christmas Story	Nominated	

=== Golden Globe Awards ===
Year	Category	Nominated work	Result	Ref.
2002	Best Supporting Actor – Motion Picture	Chicago	Nominated	
2007	Best Actor – Motion Picture Musical or Comedy	Walk Hard: The Dewey Cox Story	Nominated	
2007	Best Original Song	Walk Hard: The Dewey Cox Story	Nominated	
2018	Best Actor – Motion Picture Musical or Comedy	Stan & Ollie	Nominated	

=== Grammy Award ===
Year	Category	Nominated work	Result	Ref.
2009	Best Song Written for Visual Media	Walk Hard: The Dewey Cox Story	Nominated	

=== Independent Spirit Awards ===
Year	Category	Nominated work	Result	Ref.
2002	Best Supporting Male	The Anniversary Party	Nominated	
2003	Best Supporting Male	The Good Girl	Nominated	
2011	Best Male Lead	Cyrus	Nominated	
2012	Best Supporting Male	Cedar Rapids	Nominated	

=== Tony Award ===
Year	Category	Nominated work	Result	Ref.
2000	Best Actor in a Play	True West	Nominated	

== Miscellaneous associations ==
Organizations	Year	Category	Work	Result
Boston Society of Film Critics	2002	Best Supporting Actor	Chicago	Runner-up
Boston Society of Film Critics	2002	Best Supporting Actor	Gangs of New York	Runner-up
Boston Society of Film Critics	2002	Best Supporting Actor	The Good Girl	Runner-up
Boston Society of Film Critics	2002	Best Supporting Actor	The Hours	Runner-up
Boston Society of Film Critics	2011	Best Cast	Carnage	Won
Boston Society of Film Critics	2018	Best Actor	Stan & Ollie	Won
Detroit Film Critics Society	2014	Best Ensemble	Guardians of the Galaxy	Won
Florida Film Critics Circle	1998	Best Cast	Boogie Nights	Won
Florida Film Critics Circle	2000	Best Cast	Magnolia	Won
Golden Raspberry Awards	2019	Worst Supporting Actor	Holmes & Watson	Won
Golden Raspberry Awards	2019	Worst Screen Combo	Holmes & Watson	Nominated
Gotham Awards	2006	Best Ensemble Cast	A Prairie Home Companion	Nominated
Las Vegas Film Critics Society	2003	Best Supporting Actor	Chicago	Won
Las Vegas Film Critics Society	2008	Best Song	Walk Hard: The Dewey Cox Story	Won
MTV Movie & TV Awards	2014	Best Fight	Anchorman 2: The Legend Continues	Nominated
Phoenix Film Critics Society	2003	Best Cast	Chicago	Nominated
Phoenix Film Critics Society	2015	Best Cast	Guardians of the Galaxy	Nominated
Satellite Awards	2003	Best Supporting Actor – Motion Picture	The Good Girl	Nominated
Satellite Awards	2010	Best Actor – Motion Picture Musical or Comedy	Cyrus	Nominated
Stinkers Bad Movie Awards	2006	Most Annoying Fake Accent: Male	Talladega Nights: The Ballad of Ricky Bobby	Nominated
