= Charles Strouse =

American composer and lyricist (1928–2025)

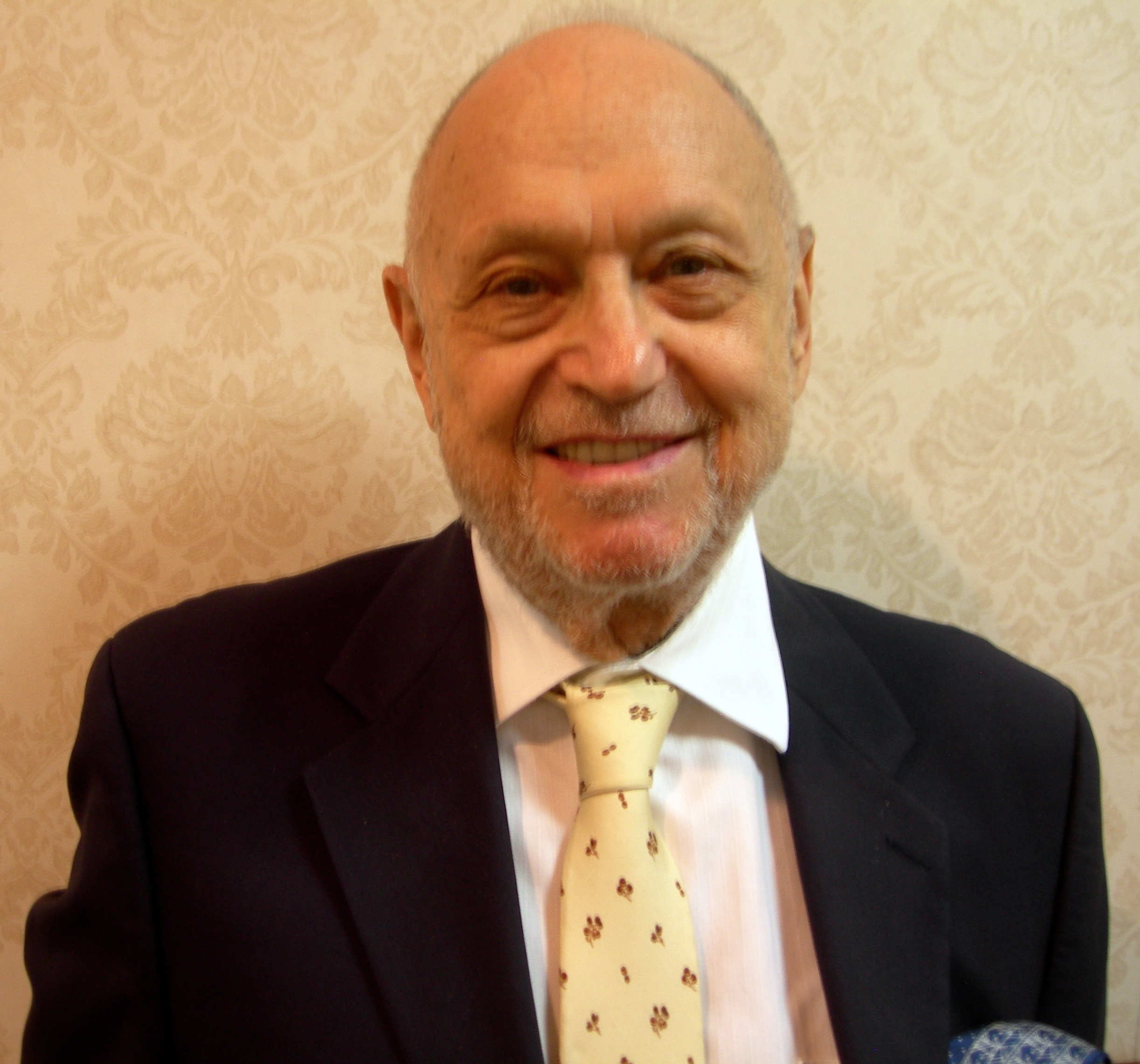
- Strouse in 2013

Background information
- Born: June 7, 1928; New York City, U.S.
- Died: May 15, 2025 (aged 96) New York City, U.S.
- Genres: Broadway musical; opera
- Occupations: Composer; lyricist
- Years active: 1952–2011
- Spouse: Barbara Siman (m. 1962; died 2023)

Charles Louis Strouse (June 7, 1928 – May 15, 2025) was an American composer and lyricist best known for writing the music to the Broadway musicals Bye Bye Birdie, Applause, and Annie.

== Background ==
Charles Louis Strouse, a native of the Upper West Side of Manhattan, New York City, was born on June 7, 1928, to Jewish parents, Ethel (née Newman) and Ira Strouse, who worked in the tobacco business. His parents suffered from physical and mental health issues, and the family found respite from their troubles when they would sing songs together at the piano, which his mother played. He graduated from the Eastman School of Music, where he studied under Arthur Berger, David Diamond, Aaron Copland, and Nadia Boulanger. He had initially aspired to a career in classical music, but Boulanger assured him that his talent for "light music" was valuable, saying "to make someone forget illness and suffering is also a calling.” His rare, happy childhood memories later inspired the credit sequence of “All in the Family,” in which Carroll O’Connor and Jean Stapleton sit at the piano, singing together.

== Career ==
Strouse began a collaboration with Lee Adams in 1952, and they had written songs together for several years by the time their first Broadway musical, Bye Bye Birdie, opened in 1960. For this show, Strouse won his first Tony Award in the category of best musical.

Strouse's next show was All American (1962), with a book by Mel Brooks and lyrics by Adams; it was not a success, closing after 80 performances, but it produced the standard “Once Upon a Time” (recorded by Perry Como, Eddie Fisher, Al Martino, Tony Bennett, Frank Sinatra, and Bobby Darin, among dozens of others).

Following this was Golden Boy (1964, also with Adams), starring Sammy Davis Jr., which ran for 568 performances. The musical It's a Bird, It's a Plane, It's Superman (1966, based on the popular comic strip) closed after 129 performances, but introduced the song "You've Got Possibilities" sung by Linda Lavin. Its theme would also be adopted by Washington, D.C. television station WTOP (now WUSA) for news broadcasts.

In 1970, Applause (starring Lauren Bacall, with book by Betty Comden and Adolph Green, and lyrics by Adams) won Strouse his second Tony Award for Best Musical. In 1977, Strouse adapted another comic strip for the stage, creating the hit Annie, which included the song "Tomorrow," which quickly became a "monstrous song hit," and garnered him his third Tony Award and two Grammy Awards.

Other Strouse musicals include Charlie and Algernon (1979), Dance a Little Closer (1983, with lyrics by Alan Jay Lerner, which closed after one performance), Rags (1986; which closed after four performances and 18 previews), Nick & Nora (1993, which closed after 9 performances), and An American Tragedy (1995, with lyrics by David Shaber, performed at Muhlenberg College).

Strouse also wrote musical revues, many with Adams, and his songs were included in revues. The revues included Shoestring Revue (with Adams and Michael Stewart) (1955 – Off–Broadway), Medium Rare (with Adams) (1960 – Chicago), By Strouse (1978 – Off–Broadway at The Ballroom), Upstairs At O'Neals (1982 – Nightclub Revue), Can't Stop Dancin (1994 – Marymount Theatre), and A Lot Of Living! (1996 – conceived and directed by Barbara Siman at Rainbow and Stars).

Strouse wrote the music and lyrics for the animated special Lyle, Lyle Crocodile which aired on HBO in 1987. His film scores include Bonnie and Clyde (1967), There Was a Crooked Man... (1970, with Henry Fonda and Kirk Douglas), the Norman Lear production of The Night They Raided Minsky's (1968, with Adams), and the popular animated movie All Dogs Go to Heaven (1989). He and Adams also wrote the theme song “Those Were the Days” for the Norman Lear television show All in the Family. Additionally, the title sequence, of Archie and Edith Bunker performing the tune at their piano, was inspired by Strouse's childhood memories of playing music with his parents at home. Strouse's songs have been heard on the radio throughout his career and have run the gamut from girl-band pop to hip hop. In 1958, his song “Born Too Late” was number seven on the Billboard charts, and in 1999 the quadruple platinum Hard Knock Life (Ghetto Anthem) by artist Jay-Z (which sampled "It's The Hard Knock Life" from Annie) was the winner of the Grammy for Best Rap Album of the year and the Billboard R&B Album of the Year.

Strouse's writing also extended into his original interest of orchestral works, chamber music, piano concertos, and opera. His Concerto America, composed in 2002 to remember 9/11 and the spirit of New York City, premiered at The Boston Pops in 2002, and his children's opera Nightingale (1982), starring Sarah Brightman, had a successful run in London, followed by many subsequent productions. In 1979, Strouse founded the ASCAP Musical Theatre Workshop in New York, through which many young composers and lyricists have found a forum for their work.

A musical stage adaptation of the Paddy Chayefsky film Marty starring John C. Reilly premiered at Boston's Huntington Theatre in October 2002, with lyrics by Lee Adams and Strouse and the book by Rupert Holmes. Real Men, for which Strouse wrote the music and lyrics, premiered in January 2005 at the Coconut Grove Playhouse in Miami, Florida, and his musical Studio, premiered at Theatre Building Chicago in August 2006. The musical Minsky's, with music by Strouse, book by Bob Martin, and lyrics by Susan Birkenhead (loosely based on the movie The Night They Raided Minsky's) premiered in January 2009 at the Ahmanson Theatre.

=== Recognition ===
Strouse won Emmy Awards for music in television adaptions of Bye Bye Birdie and Annie. He was also the recipient of the 1999 ASCAP Foundation Richard Rodgers Award and the Oscar Hammerstein Award. He became a member of the American Theater Hall of Fame (in 2001) and the Songwriters Hall of Fame.

== Personal life and death ==
Strouse was married to director-choreographer Barbara Siman until her death on February 16, 2023. They had four children.

Strouse described himself as a Jewish atheist, and said that after his sister died young from breast cancer in 1941 at the age of 40, he no longer believed in God ever since. The composer shared in various interviews including the Freedom From Religion Foundation (FFRF) that her untimely passing and a rabbi's subsequent words at her funeral were a major turning point that led him to turn away his traditional religion and family's faith during his teenage years. He received the Emperor Has No Clothes Award at the FFRF's 34th annual national convention on October 8, 2011. The award is "reserved for public figures who make known their dissent from religion".

Strouse died at his Manhattan home on May 15, 2025, at the age of 96. At the time of his death, he was the sole remaining member of the team that produced Annie, following Thomas Meehan's death in 2017, and Martin Charnin's death in 2019.

== Musicals ==
- A Pound in Your Pocket (1959; Palm Beach, Florida)
- Bye Bye Birdie (1960)
- All American (1962)
- Golden Boy (1964)
- It's a Bird, It's a Plane, It's Superman (1966)
- Applause (1970)
- Six (1971, Off-Broadway)
- I and Albert (1972, London)
- Annie (1977)
- A Broadway Musical (1978)
- Charlie and Algernon (1979, London, as Flowers for Algernon); (1981)
- Bring Back Birdie (1981)
- Nightingale (1982; this work is often described as an opera)
- Dance a Little Closer (1983)
- Mayor (1985, Off-Broadway)
- Rags (1986)
- Lyle, Lyle, Crocodile (1988; Albany, NY)
- Annie 2: Miss Hannigan's Revenge (1989, Washington, DC)
- Charlotte's Web (1989; Wilmington, Delaware)
- Nick & Nora (1991)
- Annie Warbucks (1993, Off-Broadway)
- Bojangles (1993; Richmond, Virginia)
- An American Tragedy (1995, Muhlenberg College, 2010)
- Alexander and the Terrible, Horrible, No Good, Very Bad Day (1998)
- Marty (2002, Boston)
- The Future of the American Musical Theater (2004 opera, Eastman School of Music)
- Real Men (2005, Miami)
- Studio (2006, Chicago)
- Minsky's (2009, Los Angeles)
- Martin: A New American Musical (2011, Miami)

== Film scores ==
- Bonnie and Clyde (1967)
- The Night They Raided Minsky's (1968)
- There Was a Crooked Man... (1970)
- Just Tell Me What You Want (1980)
- Annie (1982)
- The Worst Witch (1986)
- Ishtar (1987)
- All Dogs Go to Heaven (1989) (songs only)
- Alexander and the Terrible, Horrible, No Good, Very Bad Day (1990)

== Awards and nominations ==
- 1961 Tony Award for Best Musical (Bye Bye Birdie, winner)
- 1965 Tony Award for Best Musical (Golden Boy, nominee)
- 1970 Tony Award for Best Musical (Applause, winner)
- 1977 Tony Award for Best Original Score (Annie, winner)
- 1977 Drama Desk Award for Outstanding Music (Annie, nominee)
- 1981 Tony Award for Best Original Score (Charlie and Algernon, nominee)
- 1986 Drama Desk Award for Outstanding Music (Mayor, nominee)
- 1987 Tony Award for Best Original Score (Rags, nominee)
- 1987 Drama Desk Award for Outstanding Music (Rags, nominee)
- 1992 Tony Award for Best Original Score (Nick & Nora, nominee)
- 1996 Emmy Award for Outstanding Original Music and Lyrics (Bye Bye Birdie, winner)
- 2012 Rochester (NY) Music Hall of Fame (Lifetime Body of Work)
- 2013 Five Towns College named Charles Strouse School of Music
