= The Night They Raided Minsky's =

1968 musical film directed by William Friedkin

- Theatrical release poster by Frank Frazetta
- Directed by: William Friedkin
- Written by: Norman Lear; Sidney Michaels; Arnold Schulman
- Based on: The Night They Raided Minsky's (1960 novel) by Rowland Barber
- Produced by: Norman Lear
- Starring: Jason Robards; Britt Ekland; Norman Wisdom; Bert Lahr
- Cinematography: Andrew Laszlo
- Edited by: Ralph Rosenblum
- Music by: Philip J. Lang; Charles Strouse; Lee Adams (songs)
- Production company: Tandem Productions
- Distributed by: United Artists
- Release date: December 18, 1968
- Running time: 99 minutes
- Country: United States
- Language: English
- Box office: $3 million (rentals)

The Night They Raided Minsky's is a 1968 American musical comedy film written and produced by Norman Lear, with music and lyrics by the duo of Charles Strouse and Lee Adams, and directed by William Friedkin. Based on a 1960 novel by Rowland Barber, the film is a fictional account of the invention of the striptease at Minsky's Burlesque in 1925. It stars Jason Robards, Britt Ekland, Norman Wisdom, Forrest Tucker, Harry Andrews, Denholm Elliott, Elliott Gould and Bert Lahr.

The film was released by United Artists on December 18, 1968, to generally positive reviews. It was a financial success and later spawned a stage musical adaptation, Minsky's, in 2009.

== Plot ==
In 1925 Rachel Schpitendavel, an innocent Amish girl from rural Pennsylvania, arrives in New York's Lower East Side hoping to make it as a dancer. Rachel's dances are based on Bible stories. She auditions at Minsky's Burlesque, but her dances are much too dull and chaste for the bawdy show. But Billy Minsky and the show's jaded straight man, Raymond Paine, concoct a plan to use Rachel to foil moral crusader Vance Fowler, who is intent on shutting down the theater.

Minsky publicizes Rachel as the notorious Madamoiselle Fifi, performing the "dance that drove a million Frenchmen wild", hoping it will prompt a raid by Fowler and the police. Instead, Billy would let Rachel perform her innocuous Bible dances, thus humiliating Fowler.

During the run-up to her midnight performance, Raymond and his partner, comedian Chick Williams, show Rachel the ropes of burlesque, and they both fall for her in the process. Meanwhile, Rachel's stern father, who even objects to her Bible dances, arrives in search of his daughter.

The film climaxes when Rachel takes the stage after her father has called her a whore and she realizes that Raymond and the Minskys are just using her. Her father tries to drag her offstage, but she resists, tearing a slit in her dress. The sold-out crowd spurs her on, and Rachel begins to enjoy her power over the audience and starts to strip. She looks into the wings and sees Raymond, who senses a raid and perhaps the end of an era, leaving the theater for good. Rachel calls and throws out her arms to him, inadvertently dropping the front of her dress and baring her breasts. Fowler blows his whistle and the police rush to the stage and close down the show. A madcap melee follows. In the end, most of the cast members are loaded into a paddy wagon, including Rachel's bewildered father.

== Cast ==
- Jason Robards as Raymond Paine
- Britt Ekland as Rachel Elizabeth Schpitendavel
- Norman Wisdom as Chick Williams
- Forrest Tucker as Trim Houlihan
- Harry Andrews as Jacob Schpitendavel
- Joseph Wiseman as Louis Minsky
- Denholm Elliott as Vance Fowler
- Elliott Gould as Billy Minsky
- Jack Burns as Candy Butcher
- Bert Lahr as Professor Spats
- Richard Libertini as "Pockets"
- Gloria LeRoy as Mae Harris
- Judith Lowry as Mother Annie
- Chanin Hale as Valerie
- Lillian Hayman as Speakeasy Singer
- Rudy Vallee as the voice of the narrator

== Background ==
In his book Minsky's Burlesque, Morton Minsky (with Milt Machlin) wrote, "As for April 20, 1925, the day that the raid on which the book was based took place, it was hardly epochal in the history of burlesque, but it did turn out to be a prelude to much greater troubles... Anyway, the raid story was fun, but the raid itself was simply one of the dozens to which we had become accustomed; certainly no big crisis."

Minsky's theater, the National Winter Garden on Houston Street, was raided for the first time in 1917 when Mae Dix absentmindedly began removing her costume before she reached the wings. When the crowd cheered, Dix returned to the stage and continued removing her clothing to wild applause. Morton's older brother, Billy, ordered the "accident" repeated every night. This began an endless cycle; to keep their license, the Minskys had to keep their shows clean but to keep drawing customers, they had to be risqué. Whenever they went too far, however, they were raided.

According to Morton Minsky, Mademoiselle Fifi was a woman named Mary Dawson from Pennsylvania. Morton suggests that Billy persuaded Dawson to expose her breasts to create a sensation. By 1925, it was permissible for girls in legitimate shows staged by Ziegfeld, George White and Earl Carroll – as well as burlesque – to appear topless as long as they were stationary in a "living tableau". Mademoiselle Fifi stripped to the waist but moved, triggering the raid. "Although the show, in general, had been tame," Morton wrote, "Fifi's finale and the publicity that soon followed the raid ensured full houses at the soon-to-be-opened [Minsky's] theater uptown [on 42nd Street]." (The Minskys did not stage burlesque on 42nd Street until 1931 when they leased the Republic Theater. They had a short-lived venture at the Park Theater on Columbus Circle in 1922 but left that theater after only a year. They leased the Apollo Theater on 125th Street from 1924 until 1933, after which it became famous as a showcase for African-American talent.)

In 1975, Mary Dawson, then 85, refuted the legend. "I was never a stripteaser. I never did anything risque." She said that novelist Rowland Barber "just put all that in the book to make it better". She claimed she was not even at the theater that night. Her father was a police officer and a straitlaced Quaker, although he never came to New York City and never led a raid on one of the Minsky burlesque houses.

=== Proposed Stage Show ===
In April 1961, producer Leonard Key outbid several others for the stage rights to Rowland Barber's book. (Debbie Reynolds reportedly had sought film rights in 1961 as well.) At that time it was reported to be the highest price ever paid for such rights, and that the novel would be adapted by screenwriter Edward Chodorov. Later in the year, however, Key had enlisted screenwriter Julius J. Epstein. At these early stages, Sammy Cahn as well as Johnny Mercer and Henry Mancini were rumored to write the music. The show never found financial backing before the option for the stage rights ran out two years later in 1963.

== Production ==
=== Development ===
Norman Lear and Bud Yorkin bought the film rights in September 1965. Lear originally announced that production would begin in the fall of 1966. Dick Shawn was reportedly considered for the "lead role" (unspecified) in July 1966. However, filming didn't begin until a year later, on October 8, 1967.

Lear and York had a two-picture deal with National General Pictures (NGP) which financed Divorce American Style (1967) from the team. However NGP did not like the script for Minsky's and turned down the project. Lear took it to United Artists who agreed to finance.

Editor Ralph Rosenblum recalled: "From the very beginning, the idea behind The Night They Raided Minsky's had been to create an 'old-fashioned musical with a New Look'...although what it was and how it was going to be accomplished no one knew...Had anyone dared to acknowledge that the New Look we hoped to achieve in Minsky's was essentially a [Richard] Lester look, we all might have been saved some anguish; but such an acknowledgement would have been considered inappropriate, if not blasphemous, and so it barely crossed our minds."

Originally Bud Yorkin was meant to direct. However he went off to make Inspector Clouseau instead and another director was needed. On May 23, 1967, the Los Angeles Times reported that William Friedkin was set to direct. Friedkin's first film, Good Times (1967), starring Sonny and Cher, had just been released. A musical comedy that spoofs various movie genres, including mysteries, westerns, and spy thrillers, it was a critical and box-office flop but it impressed Lear and Yorkin. Friedkin was quoted as saying that The Night They Raided Minsky's will be a "poetic reality".

Arnold Schulman wrote the first draft but was replaced.

Friedkin said Lear "structured his screenplay like a burlesque show where everything was a series of one liners, including the characterizations." He felt "the ony way to save that script was to Richard Lester it up with a lot of schtick which I hate doing."

=== Casting ===
Norman Lear wrote in his memoirs he always wanted to cast Britt Ekland and Bert Lahr.

Tony Curtis was cast as Raymond Paine in June 1967. (Raymond Paine was the name of a real straight man who was in the show that night. He was killed in a hit-and-run accident in 1934.) He dropped out a month later, reportedly over creative differences. In his memoirs, both Friedkin and Lear said the actor went to make The Boston Stranger instead.

Alan Alda, whose father, Robert Alda, had been in burlesque, was cast as Paine, but was unable to leave his role on Broadway in The Apple Tree. Walter Matthau, at one stage, was going to play Paine. Jason Robards took over the Paine role about a month before filming began. Elliott Gould, who was then married to Barbra Streisand, was signed in August 1967 and made his film debut as Billy Minsky.

Mickey Rooney was said to be considered for the Chick Williams role, but Joel Grey, then on Broadway in Cabaret, was initially cast. Grey had to drop out, however, because the film had no firm end date and Grey was committed to starting rehearsals for George M!, a musical about George M. Cohan, in mid-December.

British comedian Norman Wisdom, who had recently been nominated for a Tony Award for his acclaimed performance in the James Van Heusen-Sammy Cahn musical comedy Walking Happy, was cast. Wisdom had made a series of low-budget star-vehicle comedies for the Rank Organisation. Never highly regarded by critics, Wisdom's films had enjoyed good box-office returns in his native country. The Night They Raided Minsky's was his first American film (although he made Androcles and the Lion for television), and he received good notices. A contributor to Variety wrote: "So easily does Wisdom dominate his many scenes, other cast members suffer by comparison", and Time compared him to Buster Keaton.

=== Songs ===
The songs were written by the Broadway team of composer Charles Strouse and lyricist Lee Adams, who had won a Tony Award for the musical Bye Bye Birdie in 1961. They would also write the theme song "Those Were The Days" for Lear's sitcom All in the Family.

Strouse said he and Adams wrote and recorded four songs before filming to save time: the title track, "Perfect Gentlemen", "Ten Terrific Girls" and "You Rat You."

The score was orchestrated and conducted by Broadway veteran Philip J. Lang, working on his only film made for theatrical release.

=== Shooting ===
The Night They Raided Minsky's was the first musical shot entirely on location in New York City. The budget exceeded $3 million, making it the most expensive film shot in the city up to that time. A block of East 26th Street between First and Second Avenues was transformed into the Lower East Side c. 1925. (The vacant tenements on the block were scheduled to be torn down as part of an urban renewal project, but the city postponed demolition for the filmmakers.) Parking meters were disguised by garbage cans and barrels. Exteriors were shot there for two weeks. A portion of an elevated train station 30 feet tall and 56 feet long was built. A scene in a subway car was filmed on the Myrtle Avenue elevated in Brooklyn. Some interiors were filmed at Chelsea Studios. The theater sequences were filmed at what was then the Gayety Theater (now the Village East Cinema), at 181 Second Avenue on the Lower East Side.

The Night They Raided Minsky's was Bert Lahr's last film. The 72-year-old comedian, best known for his role as the Cowardly Lion in The Wizard of Oz, was a veteran of the old Columbia burlesque wheel. Lahr was hospitalized on November 21 for what was reported as a back ailment. In Notes on a Cowardly Lion: The Biography of Bert Lahr, his son, John Lahr, wrote: "Bert Lahr died in the early morning of December 4, 1967. Two weeks before, he had returned home at 2 a.m., chilled and feverish, from the damp studio where The Night They Raided Minsky's was being filmed. Ordinarily, a man of his age and reputation would not have had to perform that late into the night, but he had waived that proviso in his contract because of his trust in the producer and his need to work. The newspapers reported the cause of death as pneumonia; but he succumbed to cancer, a disease he feared but never knew he had."

Most of Lahr's scenes had already been shot. Norman Lear told The New York Times that "through judicious editing, we will be able to shoot the rest of the film so that his wonderful performance will remain intact." The producers used test footage of Lahr, plus an uncredited voice double and a body double, burlesque legend Joey Faye, to complete the late comedian's role.

Filming began on October 8 and was scheduled to wrap on December 22, 1967. The movie was released exactly a year later, on December 22, 1968.

=== Post-production ===
Film editor Ralph Rosenblum documented his experience working on The Night They Raided Minsky's in his 1979 book (written with Robert Karen), When the Shooting Stops ...The Cutting Begins. ISBN 0670759910

Rosenblum wrote: "I had taken Minsky's on not because I believed it would be a great editorial challenge but because I saw it as a lark. I had just come off six months on The Producers, a trying experience that pickled my nerve endings, and I badly needed a soothing job...The script revealed a frothy, unimportant film full of musical numbers, the kind of thing that might be snapped into shape in six to eight weeks of editing. I loved cutting musicals; I expected a short stretch of mindless fun." In the end, it took him over nine months to cut the film.

Rosenblum called the screening of his first cut with Friedkin and Lear "disastrous." "The chief drawback of Minsky's dramatic episodes was their predictability," Rosenblum wrote. "The script had aimed for an old-fashioned charm, but, with a few important exceptions, no new twist of sophistication was added to please a modern audience." When the cut was screened for David Picker, an executive VP of United Artists, he called it "the worst first cut I've ever seen." However, since there was no set release date for the film, Picker told Lear and Rosenblum, "Whatever you want to do, go ahead, take your time, and do it."

Drawing on his background editing documentaries, Rosenblum turned to the huge stock film libraries in New York and began selecting clips from the 1920s. By arduous trial and error, this footage was used not only to evoke a sense of time and place but also to comment on and enhance scenes in the film. Rosenblum created montages of this material and Friedkin's footage, often marrying vintage footage with new by transitioning from black and white into color. The effect, Rosenblum wrote, was "magical."

While Rosenblum worked over the cut throughout most of 1968, Lear was developing other projects, including one that would become the TV series All in the Family; Friedkin, meanwhile, was in England, directing the film adaptation of Harold Pinter's The Birthday Party. Not long after he saw the first cut of Minsky's, Friedkin was interviewed on British television, and called Minsky's "the biggest piece of crap I'd ever worked on." According to Rosenblum, "I'd heard that [Friedkin] would be barred from screenings [of Minsky's] because of his talk show blunder and would have to pay to get in."

Eventually, The Night They Raided Minsky's was remade in the cutting room. "Above all, this emerging Minsky's was highly contemporary," Rosenblum wrote. "One might even conclude it had a New Look. The obvious fact that had eluded us from the beginning suddenly struck me now: The avant-garde quality Richard Lester had achieved in films like Help! could only be accomplished through editing. From the moment the Search for the New Look began, Minsky's was destined to be a cutting-room picture."

Rosenblum claimed that there are 1,440 cuts in the film; by comparison, Annie Hall, a film of the same length, has only 382.

Of course, most of the credit went to Friedkin, who, according to Rosenblum, "may not have even seen the film." Friedkin later admitted to having "no vision" for Minsky's and instead borrowed from Rouben Mamoulian's film Applause (1929), an early talkie about burlesque notable for its innovative camera work.

David Picker wrote in his memoirs that "in post production" Lear and Rosenbaum "created a wonderful funny movie. And Friedkin was mostly 'outta sight'."

In 2008, Friedkin recalled, "Minsky's was way over my head. I didn't have a clue what to do. Norman produced it and he was a very difficult, tough guy to work with, but I learned a great deal from him and I was struggling every day on the set. It wasn't a great script...it was a lot of schtick. But it would've been a lot better if I'd been more familiar with that world of burlesque in the 20s, which I wasn't. So because of that, I think the film suffers to a great degree from that."

In an online interview in 2012, Friedkin said, "I have few if any positive, memories of it. But when I made the DVD recently, having not seen the film for 40 years, I thought it had some pleasant and amusing moments."

In his 2013 memoir, The Friedkin Connection, the director wrote: "There were many problems with it, but the biggest was my ineptitude. I had researched the period but I didn't know how to convey the right tone." At one point he asked Norman Lear to fire him.

=== Title sequence ===
The main title sequence was designed by Pablo Ferro (1935–2018), who was also an uncredited editor on the film.

== Reception ==
The film opened in Los Angeles on December 18, 1968, before rolling out throughout the United States in December. The film received good reviews for its tribute to old-time burlesque. Roger Ebert wrote in the Chicago Sun-Times, "The Night They Raided Minsky's is being promoted as some sort of laff-a-minit, slapstick extravaganza, but it isn't. It dares to try for more than that and just about succeeds. It avoids the phony glamour and romanticism that the movies usually use to smother burlesque (as in Gypsy) and it seems to understand this most-American art form."

The New York Times critic Renata Adler wrote, "The nicest thing about the movie, which is a little broad in plot and long in spots, is its denseness and care in detail: The little ugly cough that comes from one room of a shoddy hotel; the thoughtfully worked out, poorly danced vaudeville routines; the beautifully timed, and genuinely funny, gags. 'I hear the man say impossible,' a man on the stage says when the man here hasn't said a word. And the vaudeville [sic] routines of innocence forever victimized, for an audience of fall guys, works pretty much as it must have worked in its time." (December 23, 1968)

Judith Crist, in New York magazine, wrote "...what a delight to have a chance to laugh out loud at sex! Like the burlesque, it glorifies – and with tender loving care – this boisterous, colorful, wiggling eulogy to the Lower East Side bump-and-grind culture of the 1920s is plotless, frenetic, funny, and just as good as the real thing. It's nostalgic as all get out to see the lumpy dumpy chorus, the snorers and the leerers and the lechers around the runway, the Crazy House bit and the spielers, and, beyond the theater, the East Side in its glory from the barrels of half-sours to the knishes to the Murphy-bedded hotel rooms. Director William Friedkin (this was his pre-The Birthday Party film) proves his sense of cinema again by remarkable intersplicing of newsreels and striking use of black-and-white fade-ins to color." [Friedkin, according to Ralph Rosenblum, had nothing to do with those effects.] Crist also praised the "off-beat" casting and summed up that the film was "really just what we were wishing for for Christmas."

Time magazine called the film "a valedictory valentine to old-time burlesque. In legend, the girls were glamorous, and every baggy-pants buffoon was a second W. C. Fields. In truth, the institution was as coarse as its audiences. Minsky's mixes both fact and fancy in a surprisingly successful musical ...Minsky's was 58 days in the shooting and ten months in the editing – and shows it. Marred by grainy film and fleshed out with documentary and pseudo-newsreel footage of the 1920s, the film spends too much time on pickles, pushcarts, and passersby. But it compensates with a fond, nostalgic score, a bumping, grinding chorus line, and a series of closeups of the late Bert Lahr, who plays a retired burlesque comedian. Like Lahr, the film offers an engaging blend of mockery and melancholy."

The film did better than expected at the box office, improving its earnings in its second week and outgrossing United Artists' Candy in New York, despite the latter film's more well-known cast, grossing $198,152 in its first 23 days from two theaters in the city.

According to an interview in the Manchester Evening News (published October 22, 2007), The Night They Raided Minsky's is Britt Ekland's favorite film of hers. Ekland divorced Peter Sellers four days before the film was released. Walter Winchell reported that the divorce stemmed from Sellers' displeasure that she had appeared nude in the film.

Ekland was quoted, "I loved William Friedkin who directed me in the film The Night They Raided Minky's because he was very specific and honest and young. He got the performance out of me which he knew I had in me."

== Historical accuracy ==
The film erroneously suggested that the night of the raid was the "night they invented striptease." Striptease was in fact invented centuries before the Minsky's raid. In the United States, Sol Bloom was reportedly making large sums of money from "hoochie coochie" shows which featured striptease-like dancing by 1893. Trapeze artist performer Charmion was also acknowledged to have been doing striptease routines by 1896.

Both of the film's implications that one raid brought down the Minsky's Burlesque and that that Minsky's fell in 1925 were inaccurate as well. The Minsky Burlesque in fact thrived in the years after the raid depicted in the film, in spite of even possibly being subjected to numerous other raids afterwards, before finally being weakened during the reign of later New York City mayor Fiorello LaGuardia, a progressive reformer who brought extreme pressure on New York City's burlesque industry and even banned the commercial use of the term "burlesque" in 1937. In his 1986 book Minsky's Burlesque, Morton Minsky recounted how the Minsky family thrived, even after being subjected to numerous raids, through the protection of LaGuardia's predecessor New York mayor Jimmy Walker, recounting the raids by saying “But we [the people of New York] were still in the Jimmy Walker era, and official censorship was rare.”

== Television series ==
In 1972, Daily Variety reported that Yorkin and Lear were adapting The Night They Raided Minsky's for a half-hour CBS sitcom called Slowly I Turned, set in the 1920s. It would have been their third sitcom, following All in the Family and Sanford and Son.

== Stage adaptation ==
A stage adaptation as a musical, titled Minsky's, opened officially on February 6, 2009, at the Ahmanson Theatre, Los Angeles, and ran through March 1, 2009. The new musical was directed and choreographed by Casey Nicholaw, with a book by Bob Martin and music and lyrics by Charles Strouse and Susan Birkenhead. Though the show's program notes that it is based on the film, the book is essentially a new story.

== Home media ==
The film was released on DVD on May 20, 2008, in wide-screen and full-screen versions.

== See also ==
- List of American films of 1968

== Notes ==
- Clagett, Thomas D. (1990). William Friedkin : films of aberration, obsession, and reality. McFarland.
- Lear, Norman (2014). Even this I get to experience. The Penguin Press.
- McGilligan, Patrick (1997). "Arnold Schulman: Nothing but Regrets". Backstory 3 : interviews with screenwriters of the 1960s. Berkeley: University of California Press. pp. 298–327.
- Rosenblum, Ralph; Karen, Robert (1979). When The Shooting Stops ... The Cutting Begins: A Film Editor's Story. Viking Press.
