= Minsky's Burlesque =

Stage shows popular in the early 20th century

Minsky's Burlesque was a brand of American burlesque presented by four sons of Louis and Ethel Minsky: Abraham "Abe" Bennett Minsky (1880–1949), Michael William "Billy" Minsky (1887–1932), Herbert Kay Minsky (1891–1959), and Morton Minsky (1902–1987). They were Jewish. They started in 1912 and ended in 1937 in New York City. Although the shows were declared obscene and outlawed, they were rather tame by modern standards.

== History ==
The eldest brother, Abe, launched the business in 1908 with a Lower East Side nickelodeon showing racy films. His own father shut him down and bought the National Winter Garden (originally, the National Theater) on Houston Street near Second Avenue, which had a theater inconveniently located on the sixth floor. He gave the theater to Abe and his brothers Billy and Herbert. At first they tried showing respectable films but could not compete with the large theater chains. The Minskys tried to bolster their shows by bringing in vaudevillians but could not afford good acts.

Then they considered burlesque. Burlesque acts were cheaper, and circuits (called "wheels") supplied a new show every week, complete with cast, costumes, and scenery. There was the Columbia Wheel, the American Wheel and, in the 1920s, the Mutual Wheel. Burlesque during this period was relatively "clean"; a fourth wheel, the Independent, actually went bankrupt in 1916 after refusing to clean up its act. The Minskys briefly considered signing with a wheel but decided to stage their own shows because it was cheaper and Billy longed to be the next Florenz Ziegfeld.

But Minsky's clientele needed a compelling reason to trek up to a sixth-floor theater. Billy realized that success in burlesque depended on how the women were featured. Abe, who had been to Paris and the Folies Bergère and Moulin Rouge, suggested importing one of their trademarks: a runway to bring the women out into the audience. The theater was reconfigured and the Minskys were the first to feature a runway in the United States. Billy had the sign out front changed to "Burlesque As You Like It – Not a Family Show," and the Minskys were on their way.

The Minskys were raided for the first time in 1917 when Mae Dix absentmindedly began removing her costume before she reached the wings. When the crowd cheered, Dix returned to the stage to continue removing her clothing to wild applause. Billy ordered the "accident" repeated every night. This began an endless cycle: to keep their license, the Minskys had to keep their shows clean, but to keep drawing customers they had to be risqué. Whenever they went too far, they were raided.

Morton joined the company in 1924 after graduating from New York University, and worked at the Little Apollo Theater on 125th Street. There was a raid during the very first show. For the next four years, the theater showed a weekly profit of $20,000 after payola.

Billy's attempt, however, to present classy burlesque at the Park Theater on Columbus Circle failed miserably.

The most infamous raid, according to the book and film The Night They Raided Minsky's, was said to have occurred in April 1925. By this time it was permissible for women in shows staged by Ziegfeld, George White, and Earl Carroll – as well as burlesque – to appear topless in a static "tableaux". (A similar rule in London theatre was enforced at the Windmill Theatre for Vivian Van Damm and Laura Henderson). The novel, by Roland Barber, fictionalizes a show at the National Winter Garden, in which Mademoiselle Fifi (née Mary Dawson from Pennsylvania), stripped to the waist, moved. (Fifi contradicted Barber's account.) (Raids were occasionally triggered by the comedy material, but dirty comics did not last long because they were a liability to the management.) A theater scholar believes that particular raid never took place. But in his book, Minsky's Burlesque, Morton Minsky (with Milt Machlin) wrote, "As for April 20, 1925, the day that the raid on which the book was based took place, it was hardly epochal in the history of burlesque, but it did turn out to be a prelude to much greater troubles... Anyway, the raid story was fun, but the raid itself was simply one of the dozens to which we had become accustomed; certainly no big crisis." However, both the book and the film which it was based on were both historically inaccurate in the way they portrayed the decline of the flagship Minsky's Burlesque in New York City, which in fact thrived in the time after the 1925 raid and was acknowledged to have been subjected to numerous other raids which didn't significantly impact its success.

Business boomed for the Minskys during Prohibition and the National Winter Garden's notoriety grew. Regular patrons included John Dos Passos, Robert Benchley, George Jean Nathan, Condé Nast, and Hart Crane (see Crane's poem "National Winter Garden" in The Bridge). Then, when Columbia Amusement Company and Mutual Burlesque Association, the large burlesque wheels (see: B. F. Keith Circuit, ), collapsed during the Depression, Minsky's became the standard bearer for stock burlesque. In Harlem, they leased the Harlem Opera House 1924, then Hurtig and Seamon's Apollo in 1928 (later the famous venue for black performers). In his 1986 book Minsky's Burlesque, Morton Minsky remarked how the Minsky family thrived, even after being subjected to numerous raids, through the protection of New York mayor Jimmy Walker, recounting the raids by saying “But we [the people of New York] were still in the Jimmy Walker era, and official censorship was rare.”, 90-91.

Billy realized that while burlesque could not be classy it could be presented in classy surroundings. In 1931, many legitimate theaters in New York closed. Billy saw an opportunity to bring the Minsky brand to Broadway, amid the respectable shows, and leased the Republic Theater on 42nd Street and staged their first show on February 12. The Republic became Minsky's flagship theater and the capital of burlesque in the United States. (The theater is now called the New Victory and specializes in children's entertainment.) Other burlesque shows were inspired to open on 42nd Street at the nearby Eltinge and Apollo Theaters.

The Great Depression ushered in an era for burlesque, and Minsky burlesque in particular. Few could afford to attend Broadway shows, yet people craved entertainment. Furthermore, there now seemed to be a supply of unemployed women who considered the steady work offered by burlesque. By the time they finished expanding, the various Minskys controlled over a dozen theaters – six in New York and others in Baltimore, Philadelphia, Albany, and Pittsburgh. They even formed their own "wheel." The election of Fiorello LaGuardia, a progressive reformer who sought to challenge the long lasting influence of dominant New York political machine Tammany Hall, as New York mayor in 1933 would also spell trouble for the flagship Minsky's Burlesque in New York as well.

Minsky's featured comics Phil Silvers, Joey Faye, Rags Ragland, Zero Mostel, Jules Munshin, B.S. Pully, Jimmy Savo, Eddie Collins, Pinky Lee, Morey Amsterdam, Red Buttons, Benny Rubin, Irving Benson, Red Skelton, and Abbott and Costello, as well as headlining stripper Gypsy Rose Lee. Others included Danny Kaye, Jack Albertson and Robert Alda, as well as strippers Georgia Sothern, Ann Corio, Margie Hart, Mara Gaye and Sherry Britton. These women, who began stripping in their teens, made between $700 and $2,000 a week.

With burlesque thriving in New York (there were now 14 burlesque theaters, including Minsky's rivals), competition was fierce. Each year, various license commissioners issued restrictions to keep burlesque from pushing the limits. But convictions were rare, so theater managers saw no need to tone down their shows.The Minskys emphasized that a good strip-tease dance must know exactly the right psychological moment to remove each garment. 'It is not just a matter of going on the stage and taking off clothes - it needs finesse.'

In 1935, irate citizens' groups began calling for action against burlesque. Fiorello H. LaGuardia deemed them a "corrupting moral influence." The city's license commissioner, Paul Moss, tried to revoke Minsky's license but the State Court of Appeals ruled that he did not have grounds without a criminal conviction. Finally, in April, 1937, a stripper at Abe Minsky's New Gotham Theater in Harlem was spotted working without a G-string. The ensuing raid led to the demise not only of Minsky burlesque but of all burlesque in New York. The conviction allowed Moss to revoke Abe's license and refuse to renew all of the other burlesque licenses in New York.

After several appeals, the Minskys and their rivals were allowed to reopen only if they adhered to new rules that forbade strippers. The owners went along, hoping to stay in business until the November election when reformist mayor Fiorello La Guardia might be voted out. But business under the new code was so bad that many New York burlesque theaters closed their doors for good. By the time La Guardia was re-elected, the word "burlesque" had been banned and, soon after, the Minsky name itself, since the two were synonymous. With that final blow, burlesque and the Minskys were finished in New York.

=== Harold Minsky ===
Of all the Minskys, only Harold, Abe's adopted son, remained active in burlesque. At the height of the Great Depression, Harold began learning all facets of the business operating the Gaiety Theater, at Broadway and 46th Street, in Times Square. "At nineteen, Harold took over the business from his father. Every summer, his parents went to Europe for vacation and the theatres would close due to the heat in New York City. Theatres weren’t air-conditioned. The performers begged Harold to keep his doors open; the girls were broke, and they desperately needed the money from the performances. So Harold stayed open and, though a ticket cost a dime, 'He made over a million dollars,' claimed his wife Dardy Minsky.”

Harold discovered and groomed dozens of famous names throughout the 1930s into the '50s. He claimed to have discovered future headliner fourteen-year-old Sherry Britton from an audition. Harold also employed and nurtured first-rate comic talents such as Phil Silvers.

In 1956, Harold brought the Minsky name to Las Vegas in a revue at the Dunes,. In January 1957, Minsky Goes to Paris premiered at the Dunes. Lou Costello, after splitting with Bud Abbott, appeared in the 1958 edition of that revue. Ray Vasquez worked for Harold Minsky and Joe Gordon at the Dunes and the Silver Slipper. He kept a chorus line, top-rate comedians, a snazzy band, and, of course, strippers. The revue ran for six years, then moved to other landmark casinos such as the Silver Slipper, the Thunderbird, and The Aladdin.

Harold resided in Las Vegas until his death in 1977.

== Theatres ==
(run on a stock-company basis)

- National Winter Garden, Houston Street and Second Avenue
- Minsky's Gaiety, at Broadway and Forty-sixth
- Minsky's Gotham, in Harlem
- Minsky’s Oriental, Broadway, below Fifty-second Street
- Republic Theatre ("Billy Minsky's"), Forty-second Street

- Burlesque Theatre (Republic Theatre management), in Brooklyn

== See also ==
- Morton Minsky
- The Night They Raided Minsky's
- Minsky's
