= An American Tragedy (musical) =

- Music: Charles Strouse
- Lyrics: Lee Adams; Mark St. Germain
- Book: David Shaber; Mark St. Germain
- Basis: Theodore Dreiser's An American Tragedy
- Productions: 1995 Backer's Audition; 2010 Muhlenberg

An American Tragedy is a 1995 musical with music by Charles Strouse, lyrics by Lee Adams and Mark St. Germain, and a libretto by David Shaber and Mark St. Germain. It was based on Theodore Dreiser's 1925 novel An American Tragedy.

== Background ==
The musical was first seen at a backer's audition in 1995. The show was being worked on and was headed to Broadway, but Strouse gave up after his original collaborator, David Shaber, died.

Charles Richter, who is the theatre director at Muhlenberg College, saw the backer's audition and remembered the score being very haunting. In 2010, Richter contacted Strouse and suggested it be staged at the college. Students went to Strouse's New York apartment, read through the script, and staged some of the numbers. Strouse's wife, Barbara Siman, became co-director and choreographer while Mark St. Germain was brought on to rework the book and lyrics.

The show was co-directed by Charles Richter and Barbara Siman, choreography by Siman, costumes by Liz Covey, lighting by John McKernon, set by Tim Averill, and musical direction by Vincent Trovato.

In 2002, Adams said that "... their next show is still waiting for a spotlight. 'An American Tragedy', their stage musicalization of the 1924 novel by Theodore Dreiser, is 'on an important desk' ...and he's hoping it gets picked up for production... We have a draft that we hope is saleable as a work in progress."

== Reception ==
Strouse said that the experience "does not have the intensity of a big commercial theater production. I have done a lot of rewriting, and adding and subtracting songs, but since there is only a six-week rehearsal period, I don't add a lot unless it is really important. In the theater there is always the desire to rewrite. I remember when I first saw 'Put on a Happy Face' in rehearsal for 'Bye Bye Birdie.' I wanted to throw it out. But Marge Champion urged me to let it stay and the result was a hit. This is all part of the process."
