= Charlotte's Web (musical) =

Stage musical by Charles Strouse

- Libretto cover
- Music: Charles Strouse
- Lyrics: Charles Strouse
- Book: Joseph Robinette
- Basis: Charlotte's Web by E.B. White
- Productions: Regional and Amateur Productions

Charlotte's Web is a stage musical with music and lyrics by Charles Strouse and based on a book by Joseph Robinette (itself based on the book by E. B. White).

== Production history ==
Charlotte's Web is licensed by Dramatic Publishing to middle schools, high schools, colleges, and community theaters worldwide. Strouse noted that the musical's film rights were held by others and that no New York producer would invest in the show without the film rights, so the musical was produced in regional theaters. Thomas S. Hischak (Professor of theatre arts at the State University of New York College at Cortland) mentioned that the musical has not played in New York City, but has had many productions in schools and other theatre organizations.

- Joseph Robinette, a retired professor of speech and theatre at Rowan University, wrote an authorized stage play with E. B. White.
- The Strouse/Robinette musical Charlotte's Web premiered at Opera Delaware in 1989.
- Tricycle Productions (Montreal, Canada) produced a touring version of Strouse's Charlotte's Web in 1996 with arrangements by Canadian composer Derek Aasland.
- Actors' Playhouse Musical Theatre for Young Audiences presented the piece in 2006–2007 at the Miracle Theatre in Coral Gables, Florida.
- The musical was presented at the Derby Theatre (Derby, England) in January 2013. The production relocated, "for no clear reason", from White's rural Maine to the West Country.
- The musical was produced at the Gordon Craig Theatre, Stevenage (England) in April 2015.

== Synopsis ==
=== Act I ===
Doc, Sadie, and Lurvy marvel at the beautiful morning ("What A Morning"). Breakfast is underway at the Arable house, but when Fern and Avery ask why Pa was up late last night, discover the newborn pigs, and that he is planning to kill one, Fern runs to save it ("Breakfast At The Arables"). He finally gives in and lets her keep the pig, and Ma goes in the house to find a baby bottle while Pa and Avery follow. Ma asks Fern what she plans to name the pig, and she decides to name it Wilbur ("Wilbur"). She goes inside for breakfast while Wilbur eats his own ("Eating").

Pa then decides Wilbur needs to be sold, and he is bought by the Zuckermans. He is quickly welcomed to the barn by all the animals, ("Nice To Meet You"). That night he is lonely and hears a voice claiming to be his friend. She says she will introduce herself in the morning. The next day he is shocked to find his new friend is a spider named Charlotte, but he doesn't mind ("Who Says We Can't Be Friends").

Edith and Homer Zuckerman are going over Honey Do Lists when they decide to put the work off until fall ("Summer"). The barnyard animals soon begin talking to Wilbur, and he learns his fate. Charlotte vows to save him; that night she carries out her plan ("Charlotte's Spinning Song"). The next day he sees an opportunity to run away, and the animals advise him to do it. However, Charlotte warns he is dying in the wild ("Freedom Now!"). After the chase, everyone takes notice of the words Some Pig in her web ("Some Pig").

The animals are thinking of a new word to put in the web and they come up with Terrific. Charlotte works on it ("As The Day Went On"). The next day, Ma and Fern come down to see it, and have a heart to heart ("Mama, You Don't Understand Me"). The reporters and townspeople notice and pressure Homer to take Wilbur to the County Fair. He gives in ("County Fair").

=== Act II ===
After the townspeople are going to the fair ("County Fair (Reprise)"), Fern and Avery soon want to go off by themselves. However, the parents give them a list of don’ts. After they leave, Fern and Avery mock them ("Don’t").

Charlotte and Wilbur are now comfortable in his stall, but when he sees the pig next door, he is worried. Charlotte reassures him that it'll be fine ("You’re You"). She then writes another word in her web to get him more attention ("Charlotte at Work"). When she is finished, she has written the word Humble.

After a day, everyone is disappointed to find that the pig next door has been the winner of the blue ribbon. However, their spirits are lifted when Wilbur wins a special medal ("Wilbur (Reprise)"). Meanwhile, when it's time to leave, Charlotte isn't able to leave, because she dies. Wilbur takes Charlotte's egg sack to hatch them; when they do, the animals are overjoyed ("Finale").

== Musical numbers ==
Act I

- "Overture" - Orchestra
- "What A Morning" * - Doc, Sadie, Lurvy
- "Breakfast At Arables"- Fern, Avery, Martha, John
- "Wilbur" - Fern
- "Eating" * - Wilbur
- "Nice To Meet You" - Barnyard Animals
- "Who Says We Can't Be Friends?" - Wilbur, Charlotte
- "Summer" - Homer, Edith, Townspeople
- "Charlotte's Spinning Song" - Charlotte, Templeton, Bat, Owl
- "Freedom Now!" * - Barnyard Animals
- "Some Pig" - Homer, Lurvy, Wilbur, Charlotte, Barnyard Animals
- "As The Day Went On" - Charlotte, Owl, Bat
- "Mama, You Don't Understand Me" * - Martha, Fern
- "County Fair" - Full Company

Act II

- "County Fair (Reprise)" - Ensemble
- "Don't" - Fern, Avery
- "You're You" - Charlotte
- "Charlotte At Work" - Charlotte
- "Wilbur (Reprise)" - Full Company
- "Finale" - Full Company

- * Excluded from Some Productions
