= Marty (musical) =

- Music: Charles Strouse
- Lyrics: Lee Adams
- Book: Rupert Holmes
- Basis: 1955 film Marty
- Premiere: October 18, 2002: Boston

Marty is a stage musical version of the 1955 film of the same name written by Paddy Chayefsky. The musical has music by Charles Strouse and Lee Adams.

== History ==
The musical had several readings. A reading was held in 2000, with Rupert Holmes as the writer (replacing Aaron Sorkin), and featuring Carol Lawrence as Marty's mother. Another reading was held in July 2001 in New York City, with direction by Robert Longbottom. The next reading was held in February 2002, with John C. Reilly heading the cast.

The musical premiered in October 2002 at the Huntington Theatre in Boston. The adaptation featured a book by Rupert Holmes, music by Charles Strouse and Lee Adams, and choreography by Rob Ashford. The production was directed by Mark Brokaw and starred John C. Reilly in the title role.

In 2003, Mark Brokaw said that the plan was to produce the musical on Broadway during the following season.

== Musical numbers ==
- "Marty"
- "Whaddya Feel Like Doin’?"
- "Saturday Night Girl"
- "Play the Game"
- "That Blue Suit"
- "Why Not You and Me?"
- "She Sees Who I Am"
- "Recessional"
- "Saturday Night Girl (Reprise)"
- "My Star"
- "Niente da Fare"
- "What Else Could I Do?"
- "Almost"
- "Life is Sweet"
- "Wish I Knew A Love Song"
