= Sherry Britton =

American burlesque performer (1918–2008)

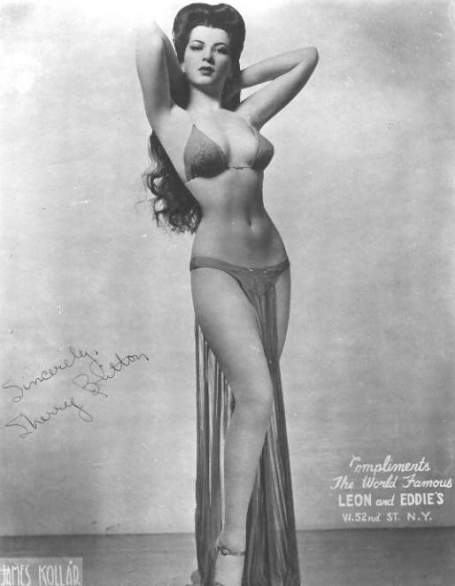
- Britton in 1945
- Born: Edith Zack; July 28, 1918; New Brunswick, New Jersey, United States
- Died: April 1, 2008 (aged 89); Manhattan, New York, United States
- Education: Fordham University
- Occupations: Burlesque dancer, actress

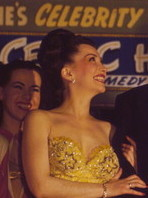
Portrait of Sherry Britton at Leon and Eddie's, New York, N.Y., July 1948

Edith Zack (July 28, 1918 – April 1, 2008), better known by the stage name Sherry Britton, was an American burlesque performer of the 1930s and early 1940s. The 5-foot-3-inch (1.60 m) Britton had an 18-inch (46 cm) waist, and was once said to have a "figure to die for."

Legend has it that she decided on her stage name when she saw a bottle of Harvey's Bristol Cream Sherry while passing through a liquor store.

== Biography ==
Britton performed in many theaters and clubs during the Golden Age of burlesque. She once said, "I despised burlesque." However, she did enjoy stripping in nightclubs, like the famous Leon & Eddie's where she was a regular for seven years. She stripped to classical music, wore lovely long gowns and tiaras and crowns. When burlesque went by the wayside due to the NYC ban in the 1940s, Britton turned to the stage, eventually appearing in almost forty plays.

Britton also spent much time during World War II entertaining troops, for which she was made an honorary Brigadier General by President Franklin D. Roosevelt.

Britton was performing in Washington, D.C., clubs as late as 1958, the year she turned 40. She was barred from appearing at the 1964 New York World's Fair, because she was too risqué. She instead became a cabaret singer and appeared in many theater productions.

In 1971, Britton, who had been married twice previously, and who once said she'd been engaged "14 times," married wealthy businessman Robert Gross (no relation to aviator Robert E. Gross). Gross urged her to attend Fordham University. Although Britton had never attended high school, she was admitted to Fordham University where she majored in courses appropriate for pre-law students. Gifted with a very high IQ, she graduated magna cum laude in 1982, at the age of 63.

After Gross died in 1990, Britton lived a life of retirement, but stepped back into the limelight in 1993, on her 75th birthday, performing at the Marriott Marquis Hotel on Broadway in NYC.

Britton died of natural causes on April 1, 2008, in New York City.
