= Minsky's =

- Music: Charles Strouse
- Lyrics: Susan Birkenhead
- Book: Bob Martin
- Basis: 1968 film The Night They Raided Minsky's
- Productions: 2009 Los Angeles

Minsky's is a musical by Bob Martin (book), Charles Strouse (music), and Susan Birkenhead (lyrics), and is loosely based on the 1968 movie The Night They Raided Minsky's.

Set during the Great Depression era in Manhattan, the story centers around a jaded burlesque producer (Billy Minsky), a politician trying to shut him down (Randolph Sumner), and an innocent young girl who gets caught between them (Sumner's daughter, Mary).

== Production history ==
Minsky's began previews at the Ahmanson Theatre on January 21, 2009, officially opened on February 6, 2009, and ran through March 1, 2009. Directed and choreographed by Casey Nicholaw, it starred Christopher Fitzgerald as Billy Minsky, Katharine Leonard as Mary Sumner, George Wendt as Randolph Sumner, and Rachel Dratch in the comedic role of Beula. Costume design was by Gregg Barnes, and lighting design by Ken Billington. In March 2010, the production won LA Drama Critics Awards for Music Direction, Musical Score, and Costume Design.

Producers Kevin McCollum and Bob Boyett had said that they planned to bring the musical to Broadway during the 2009–10 season. The producers will "refine" the show before Broadway. However, as of June 2011, it had not transferred to Broadway. WhatsOnStage.com reported in June 2009 that the musical would open in the West End "in late 2010 or early 2011."

== Synopsis ==
=== Act One ===
Billy Minsky is struggling to keep his burlesque theater, the Winter Garden, alive through the depression. With ticket sales down, he needs some new way to sell his show. Meanwhile, on a trip to his psychoanalyst, he meets a beautiful girl, Mary, and falls in love with her. He soon finds out that this girl is the daughter of the politician, Randolph Sumner, who is trying to shut his theater down for lewd material. Billy then tries to win over both Mary and Randolph by posing as a political activist (assuming a different name) while making his dim-witted employee Boris pose as operator of the theater, Billy Minsky. The real Minsky, meanwhile, is torn between his newfound love for the politician's daughter and the loyalty he feels to the cast and crew of his theater. He claims that he has convinced Minsky (really his employee Boris) to clean up the show, and invites Sumner to come and see it. His real motive is to get a compromising photograph of Sumner under false pretenses to derail his political career. He is successful in this enterprise, but, in so doing, reveals his real identity and thereby alienates Sumner's daughter, Mary.

=== Act Two ===
Billy has thwarted his opponent, Sumner, but has also lost all hope of winning his daughter Mary. He has saved his theater, and all of its employees, but at the expense of his own happiness. He is given an unexpected second chance, however, when Mary returns to the theater under cover, seeking revenge. Billy sees through her disguise right away, but decides to play along with it in the hopes that they might be reconciled. Although Mary originally returns (with her father in drag) to destroy Billy and his theater, she finds herself more and more sympathetic to the people who make their living there, and in the end she finds it difficult to choose between her father's wishes and the livelihood of the Winter Garden Theater cast and crew.

== Musical numbers ==
Act I

- Workin' Hot
- Cleopatra
- Happy
- Someone
- Keep It Clean
- Bananas
- You Gotta Get Up When You're Down
- Eyes Like That
- God Bless The U.S.A
- Every Number Needs A Button

Act II

- Tap Happy
- Bananas (Reprise)
- I've Got Better Things To Do
- I Could Get Used to This/ Bring Us Out of Our Shell
- Home
- I Want A Life
- Workin' Hot (Reprise)
- Cleopatra (Reprise)
- Bananas (Reprise)
- Nothing Lasts Forever
- Home (Reprise)
