= John C. Reilly =

American actor (born 1965)

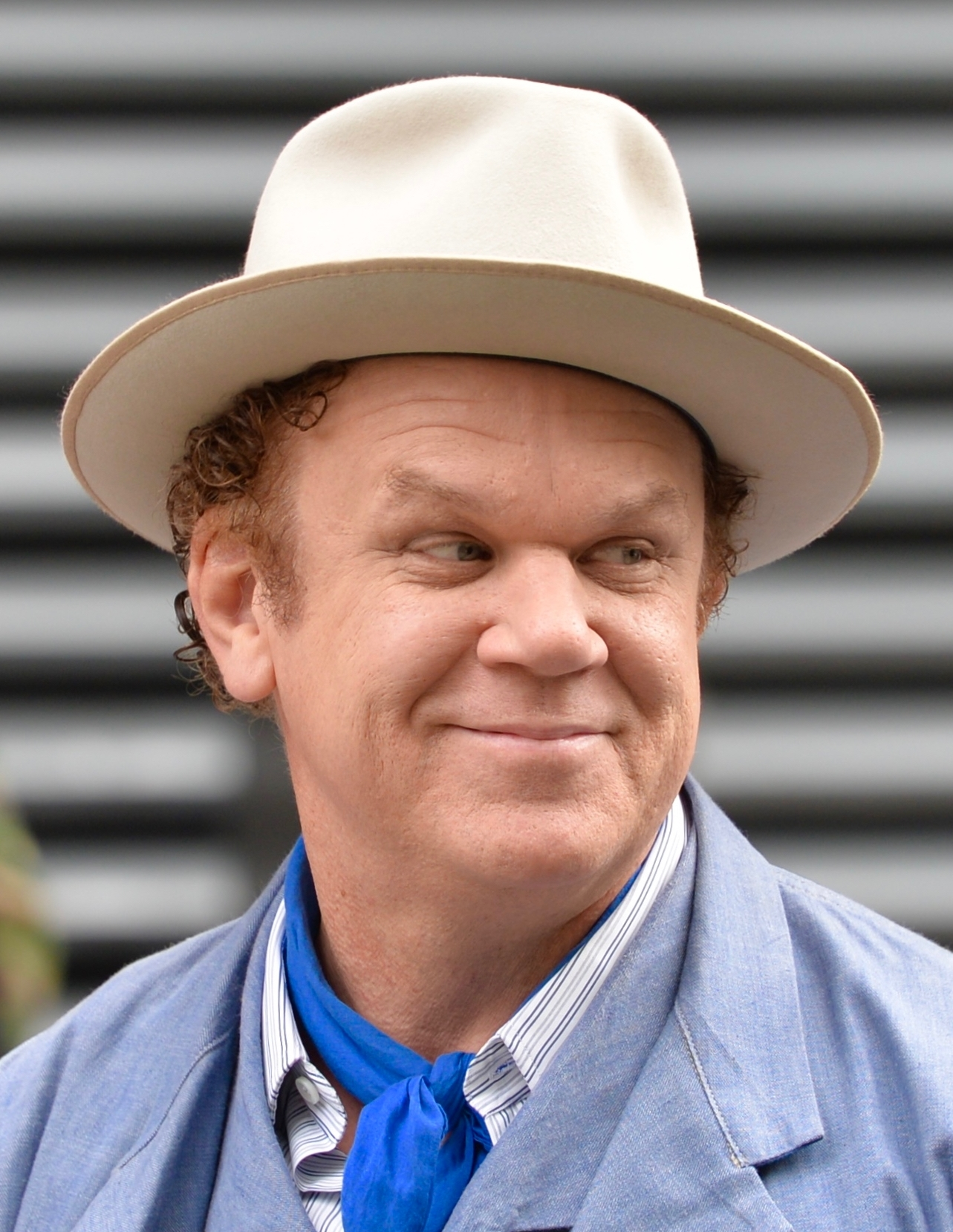
- Reilly in 2018
- Born: John Christopher Reilly; May 24, 1965 (age 61); Chicago, Illinois, U.S.
- Occupation: Actor
- Years active: 1988–present
- Works: Filmography
- Spouse: Alison Dickey (m. 1992)
- Children: 2
- Awards: Full list

John Christopher Reilly (born May 24, 1965) is an American actor. A character actor, he is known for his work with leading and supporting roles in both independent films and major studio features. The recipient of various accolades, Reilly is one of only two people to have been nominated for an Emmy Award, a Grammy Award, an Academy Award, and a Tony Award (EGOT) without winning any. (Note: Reilly is the second to have done so; the first was Lynn Redgrave.)

Reilly started his career in the late 1980s, gaining recognition for his supporting roles in Casualties of War (1989), Days of Thunder (1990), Hard Eight (1996), Boogie Nights (1997), Magnolia (1999), Gangs of New York (2002) and The Aviator (2004). For his performance in the musical film Chicago (2002), he received nominations for the Academy Award and Golden Globe Award for Best Supporting Actor.

Greater recognition came from Reilly's roles in comedy films Talladega Nights: The Ballad of Ricky Bobby (2006), Walk Hard: The Dewey Cox Story (2007), and Step Brothers (2008), in addition to his role as Dr. Steve Brule in the Adult Swim comedy series Tim and Eric Awesome Show, Great Job! (2007–2010) and spinoff Check It Out! with Dr. Steve Brule (2010–2016). He provided the voice of the titular character in the Wreck It Ralph films (2012–2018). He starred in the independent films Cyrus (2010), We Need to Talk About Kevin (2011), and Carnage (2011), The Lobster (2015), The Sisters Brothers (2018). He portrayed Oliver Hardy in Stan & Ollie (2018) earning a Golden Globe Award nomination.

Reilly subsequently co-created and starred in the Showtime comedy series Moonbase 8 (2020) and the HBO sports drama series Winning Time: The Rise of the Lakers Dynasty (2022–2023). He also earned a nomination for the Children's and Family Emmy Award for his role in the Disney+ animated short film An Almost Christmas Story (2024). On stage, he received a nomination for the Tony Award for Best Actor in a Play for his role in the Broadway revival of Sam Shepard's play True West (2000). Aside from acting, Reilly also performs with his band John Reilly and Friends.

== Early life and education ==
Reilly was born in Chicago, Illinois, the fifth of six children. His father was of Irish and Scottish descent, and his mother was of Lithuanian ancestry. His father ran an industrial linen supply company. Reilly has described himself as being mischievous during his childhood, highlighting an event when he was 12 in which he and his friends stole 500 boxes of Sugar Corn Pops from a freight train. Reilly grew up in the Chicago Lawn neighborhood.

Reilly was raised Catholic and attended Brother Rice High School. He attended DePaul University in Chicago.

== Career ==
=== 1988–1995: Career beginnings ===
Reilly made his film debut in the Brian De Palma war film Casualties of War as PFC Herbert Hatcher in 1989. Although his role was written as a small one, De Palma liked Reilly's performance so much that the role was significantly expanded. He played Buck, Tom Cruise's character's NASCAR crew member in Tony Scott's Days of Thunder in June 1990. That September, he played an Irish hoodlum named Stevie McGuire in the crime film State of Grace, which starred Sean Penn; Reilly had previously appeared as a monk in the comedy We're No Angels (1989), which also starred Penn. In 1992's Hoffa, Reilly played Jimmy Hoffa's (Jack Nicholson) associate who testifies against him at Hoffa's trial. Reilly appeared in a supporting role in What's Eating Gilbert Grape (1993), playing one of the title character's friends. His next role was in The River Wild (1994), in which Reilly appeared alongside Kevin Bacon as a pair of criminals who terrorize a family during a rafting trip. In 1995, Reilly appeared in the psychological thriller Dolores Claiborne as a police constable and in the drama Georgia as a drug-addicted drummer in the band Jennifer Jason Leigh's character joins.

=== 1996–2003: Critical acclaim ===
In Paul Thomas Anderson's directorial debut film Hard Eight (1996), Reilly played a near homeless man in Reno, Nevada, who is taken under the wing of a senior gambler (Philip Baker Hall). Reilly collaborated with Anderson on other films, playing a pornographic actor in Boogie Nights (1997); a deeply religious police officer in Magnolia (1999); and a cameo in the music video for Fiona Apple's single "Across the Universe". Terrence Malick's ensemble war film, The Thin Red Line (1998) featured Reilly in a supporting role that was written as a larger one, but much of his scenes were deleted along with those of many other cast members. In 1999, Reilly starred in the independent film The Settlement alongside William Fichtner, which Variety writer Robert Koehler dismissed as a "write-off" despite praising his performance. That same year, Reilly played one of the newspaper managing editors in the romantic comedy film Never Been Kissed. In Sam Raimi's sports drama For Love of the Game, released the same year, Reilly played fictional baseball catcher Gus Sinski.

The box office hit The Perfect Storm was his only release of 2000 and featured Reilly as a veteran crew member on the Andrea Gail fishing vessel which was caught in the 1991 Perfect Storm. In the Jennifer Jason Leigh and Alan Cumming directed comedy The Anniversary Party (2001), he played director Mac Forsyth. In 2002, Reilly played a stoner husband in a lackluster marriage to Jennifer Aniston's character, who cheats on him with a younger man played by Jake Gyllenhaal, in Miguel Arteta's comedy-drama The Good Girl. Later that year, Reilly appeared in three of the year's Academy Award for Best Picture nominees – Chicago, Gangs of New York and The Hours. In Chicago, he played Amos Hart, Roxanne's (Renée Zellweger) trusting husband and was nominated for the Academy Award for Best Supporting Actor, as well as the Golden Globe for Best Supporting Actor. Zellweger remarked that "John is so often the best thing about the movies he's in" and critic Roger Ebert praised the "pathetic sincere naivete" that Reilly brought to the role. Martin Scorsese's Gangs of New York featured Reilly as corrupt 19th-century constable "Happy Jack" Mulraney, while Stephen Daldry's drama The Hours saw him play the husband to Julianne Moore's character. Reilly made a brief appearance in the comedy Anger Management (2003) as a monk.

=== 2004–2011: Transition to comedy ===
Reilly has said that as a child, he was influenced by the pathos of the great clown Emmett Kelly. In a 2025 interview on The Late Show with Stephen Colbert, he called Kelly a "genius" and said he pays homage to him with a painting of the hobo clown in his office.

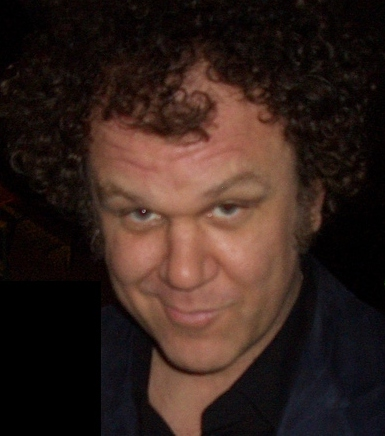
Reilly in February 2007

Reilly appeared in Martin Scorsese's 2004 Howard Hughes biopic, The Aviator, as Noah Dietrich, Howard Hughes's (Leonardo DiCaprio) trusted business partner. Of the role Reilly said, "Noah was almost a father figure to Hughes ... Howard would have a scheme, and it was Noah who had to say, 'We don't have the money.' He was one of his few friends." He played the lead role in the crime film Criminal (2004), with Diego Luna and Maggie Gyllenhaal. Based on the Argentine film Nine Queens (2000), Stephen Holden of The New York Times felt that "John C. Reilly may be one of our finer character actors, but his portrayal of Richard Gaddis, a gimlet-eyed con man, in Criminal allows too many vestiges of the duped schlub of a husband he played in Chicago to leak into his performance." Reilly reportedly quit the 2005 Lars von Trier film Manderlay to protest the on-set killing of a donkey. He played the lead in one of Miranda July's short films, Are You the Favorite Person of Anybody? (2005). He was in the Jennifer Connelly-led horror film Dark Water (2005) as the manager of a mysterious hotel. Reilly co-starred in Adam McKay's comedy about NASCAR drivers entitled Talladega Nights: The Ballad of Ricky Bobby in August 2006 as Cal Naughton Jr., the best friend and teammate of the title character, played by Will Ferrell. The film was successful, grossing $163 million worldwide. He appeared in Robert Altman's last film A Prairie Home Companion that same year, in addition to making an uncredited cameo appearance in Tenacious D in The Pick of Destiny as a Sasquatch.

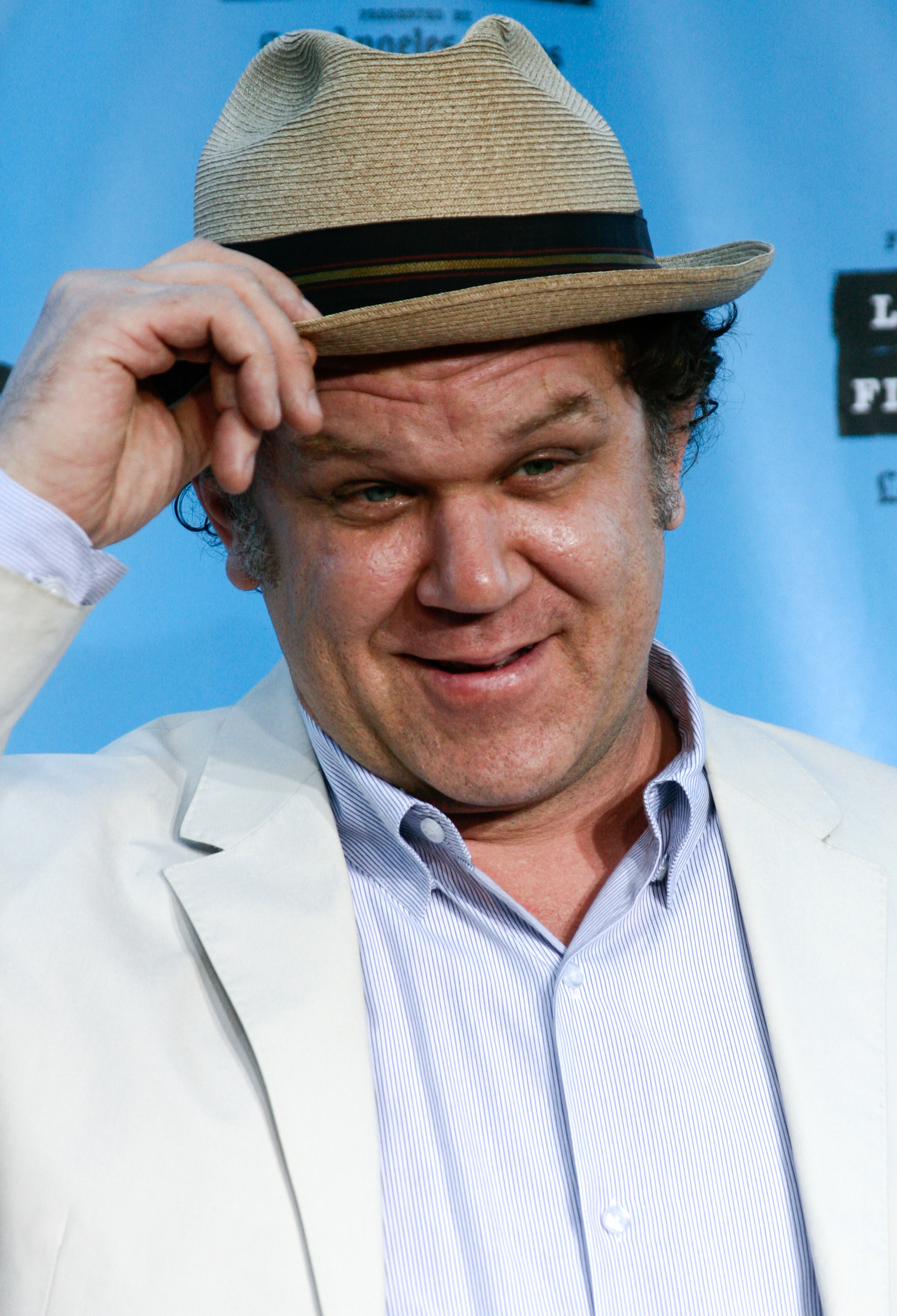
Reilly at the 2009 Los Angeles Film Festival premiere of Ponyo

Reilly frequently appeared on the sketch comedy program Tim and Eric Awesome Show, Great Job! from 2007 to 2010 as inept doctor and television presenter Dr. Steve Brule. The role led to the spin-off series Check It Out! with Dr. Steve Brule, which aired from 2010 to 2016 and was written and produced by Reilly. In 2007, Reilly starred as the title character in parody bio-pic Walk Hard: The Dewey Cox Story, singing various songs, parodying Johnny Cash, Ray Charles and others. He received two Golden Globe nominations, Best Actor – Motion Picture Musical or Comedy and Best Original Song for the film's title song "Walk Hard". The next year, Reilly reunited with Ferrell to star in Step Brothers, playing middle-aged step brothers forced to live together. Also that year, he was among the many notable actors to perform in the online political musical, Proposition 8 – The Musical, voiced himself in The Simpsons episode "Any Given Sundance", and co-starred alongside Seann William Scott in The Promotion. In 2009, he played vampire Larten Crepsley in the film Cirque du Freak: The Vampire's Assistant and voiced "5" in 9. Reilly starred in the 2010 film Cyrus as a divorcé beginning a new relationship. Reilly received a Satellite Award nomination for Best Actor – Motion Picture Musical or Comedy and an Independent Spirit Award for Best Male Lead nomination for his critically acclaimed performance.

In early 2011, Reilly collaborated with director Miguel Arteta for a second time with the comedy Cedar Rapids, starring Ed Helms. New York Daily News critic Elizabeth Weizxman considered Reilly a stand out in the film and he received an Independent Spirit Award for Best Supporting Male nomination. Reilly co-starred alongside Ezra Miller and Oscar-winner Tilda Swinton in the British-American drama We Need to Talk About Kevin, based on the novel by Lionel Shriver. His character in the film was Franklin, the father of the troubled Kevin; his performance was described as being "heartbreakingly sweet" by Slate critic Dana Stevens. Next, he co-starred in the comedy-drama Terri alongside Jacob Wysocki, playing a school principal who takes an interest in a teenage misfit. His last release of 2011 was Roman Polanski's black comedy-drama Carnage, which takes place mostly in a single apartment. It also starred Oscar-winners Jodie Foster as his wife, and Kate Winslet and Christoph Waltz as another married couple who engage in a conflict after their children get into a fight. Reilly was approached to appear in a production of the play it was based on, God of Carnage, but he couldn't fit it into his schedule and remarked "I think I've spent enough time in that apartment".

=== 2012–present: Blockbuster films ===
Reilly voiced the title character in the 2012 animated film Wreck-It Ralph, which follows an arcade game villain who is determined to prove himself as the hero. Reilly made contributions to the film's script. The film was positively received, with Los Angeles Times writer Betsy Sharkey saying, "The movie's subversive sensibility and old-school/new-school feel are a total kick." Wreck-It Ralph not only grossed over $471 million but also a sequel titled Ralph Breaks the Internet was released in November 2018. Also that year, Reilly appeared in Tim and Eric's Billion Dollar Movie as the dim-witted Taquito and made an uncredited cameo appearance in the comedy The Dictator, starring Sacha Baron Cohen. He had a cameo in the 2013 comedy sequel Anchorman 2: The Legend Continues, playing the ghost of Confederate General Stonewall Jackson in the film's fight scene.

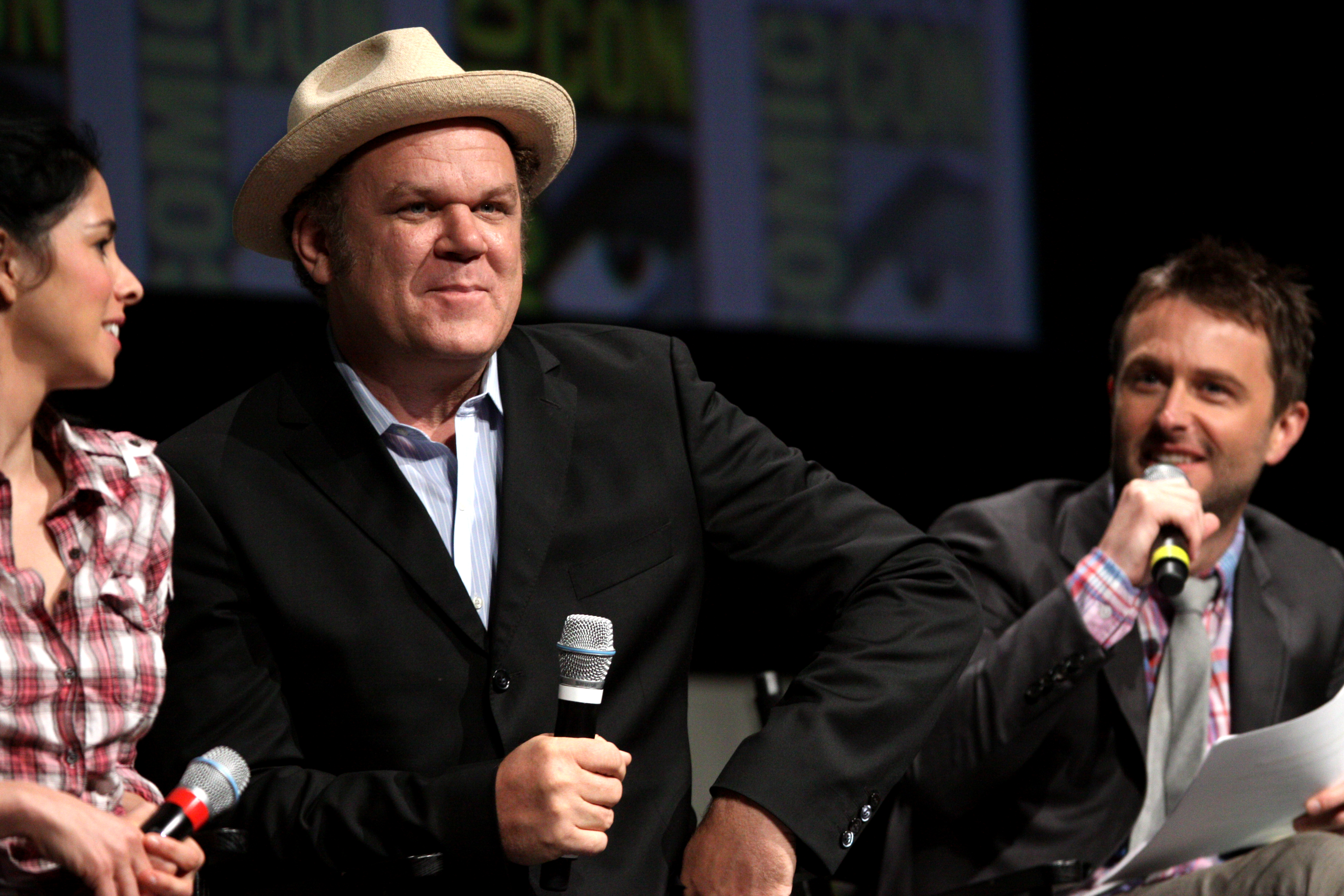
Reilly at the 2012 San Diego Comic-Con

In 2014, Reilly narrated the nature documentary Bears. He played Nova Corps corpsman Rhomann Dey in the Marvel Studios film Guardians of the Galaxy, released in August 2014. Reilly began co-starring in the animated television series Stone Quackers on FXX in January 2015. In addition to voicing the inept police officer Barry, Reilly also executive produced the series. 2015 saw him appear in five films: the drama Entertainment; Yorgos Lanthimos' comedy-drama The Lobster as Robert, a man with a lisp who is given 45 days to find a romantic partner or otherwise be turned into an animal; the fantasy horror Tale of Tales, in which he played a king who tries to conceive a child with his queen–played by Salma Hayek–through an unconventional method, and the English dub of the Studio Ghibli animated film When Marnie Was There. Reilly also starred in and co-wrote the television special Bagboy, reprising his role as Dr. Steve Brule in a fictional television pilot for a sitcom created by Brule. It aired on February 21, 2015, with Vanity Fair writer Melissa Locker saying "If you get it, the show is knockout hilarious, but truthfully, it is not for everyone and Reilly is O.K. with that."

Reilly voiced a sheep in the ensemble cast of the animated musical comedy Sing, which was released in December 2016. Reilly appeared in the 2017 monster film reboot Kong: Skull Island, as Hank Marlow, a World War II lieutenant who has spent 28 years stranded on the titular island. The actor, who described his character as "essentially a love-letter to Chicago", was singled out for praise for his performance out of what is generally considered to be an underwhelming ensemble cast. Film critic Matt Zoller Seitz noted that Reilly "steals the film instantly and never gives it back" in playing the "wisecracking castaway", and Owen Gleiberman praised his performance for being "terrifically dry and sly" in what could have been a cliché character.

Reilly co-starred with Steve Coogan in the 2018 biopic Stan & Ollie about the comic double act Laurel and Hardy, with Reilly portraying Oliver Hardy and Coogan Stan Laurel. Also that year, he played hitman Eli Sisters in The Sisters Brothers, based on the Patrick deWitt Western novel, with Joaquin Phoenix co-starring as his brother Charlie, Jacques Audiard directing, and Reilly as a producer. Reilly himself optioned the rights in 2011, and production took place in the summer of 2017. In 2018, Reilly played Dr. Watson in a comedic adaptation of the Sherlock Holmes stories, Holmes & Watson; Will Ferrell played Holmes. In the same year, Reilly reprised his role as Wreck-It Ralph in Ralph Breaks the Internet, and again in 2023 for Disney's centenary short film Once Upon a Studio.

He made an uncredited cameo appearance as Munsters star Fred Gwynne in Paul Thomas Anderson's Licorice Pizza (2021).

=== Music ===
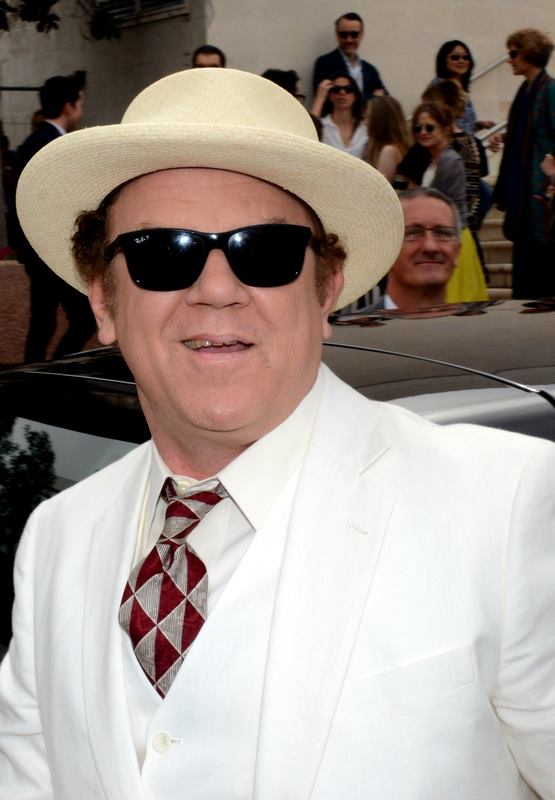
Reilly at the 2015 Cannes Film Festival

In 1998, Reilly appeared, along with Giovanni Ribisi and Winona Ryder, as Jon Spencer Blues Explosion in their video "Talk About The Blues". In 2002, he played the role of Amos Hart, Roxie Hart's naïve husband, in the musical film Chicago. In 2006, he performed two songs on Rogue's Gallery: Pirate Ballads, Sea Songs, and Chanteys: "Fathom the Bowl" and "My Son John". In 2007, Reilly starred in the biopic parody Walk Hard: The Dewey Cox Story. In addition to his acting role, he also performed as a vocalist and songwriter on the movie's soundtrack, for which he was nominated for a Grammy. Reilly went on a concert performance tour in the US, performing as his character Dewey Cox in the Cox Across America 2007 Tour.

In 2011, he recorded songs produced by Jack White and released as two singles by White's Third Man Records. The first single features two The Delmore Brothers songs: "Gonna Lay Down My Old Guitar" and "Lonesome Yodel Blues #2", both performed with Tom Brosseau. The second single features Ray Price's "I'll Be There If You Ever Want" as well as the country classic "I'm Making Plans", performed with Becky Stark. He also appeared as "future Mike D" in the Beastie Boys' video "Make Some Noise". In 2012, his current band, John Reilly & Friends, was slated to perform in the Railroad Revival Tour, alongside Willie Nelson & Family, Band of Horses and Jamey Johnson. However, the event was cancelled.

On April 21, 2011, Reilly appeared at a New LA Folk Festival event to benefit the Japanese Red Cross Society, in response to the devastating earthquake. The event featured material from the Louvin Brothers and included performances by Sean Watkins, and Wimberley Bluegrass Band.

In 2014, Reilly appeared on the music video for Mr. Oizo's song "HAM" in which he played Father. Directed by Eric Wareheim, "HAM" is an excerpt from the television comedy Rubberhead, which displays sketches from various comedians. In February 2015, John Reilly & Friends performed on NPR Music's Tiny Desk Concert series. In 2017, Reilly appeared in Lil Dicky's music video for "Pillow Talking". Additionally in 2017, Reilly appeared on A$AP Mob's album Cozy Tapes Vol. 2: Too Cozy as Principal Daryl Choad.

In 2022, he sang the Percy French-composed song "Eileen Óg" with singer and button accordion player Séamus Begley on the Irish traditional band Téada's album "Coiscéim Coiligh /As the Days Brighten."

On June 13, 2025, Reilly released his debut album What's Not To Love? under the pseudonym Mister Romantic. On June 17, he appeared as the titular character in the music video for "Archbishop Harold Homes" by Jack White.

=== Theatre ===
Reilly is known as a versatile stage actor. He has participated in numerous Broadway productions and was nominated for a Tony Award for Best Actor in a Play for the 2000 Broadway production of Sam Shepard's True West. He and co-star Philip Seymour Hoffman (after starring in Hard Eight and Boogie Nights) were both nominated, alternating between the two lead characters during separate performances. From October to November 2002, Reilly starred as the title character in the musical Marty, a musical adaptation of the Paddy Chayefsky-penned film Marty (1955). In 2005, he appeared as Stanley Kowalski in Edward Hall's production of the Tennessee Williams play A Streetcar Named Desire. Reilly stated in 2010 that he would be very determined to play the lead role of Nathan Detroit if a revival of the musical Guys and Dolls were to occur.

In March 2012, he was featured in a performance of Dustin Lance Black's play, 8—a staged reenactment of the federal trial that overturned California's Prop 8 ban on same-sex marriage—as David Blankenhorn. The production was held at the Wilshire Ebell Theatre and broadcast on YouTube to raise money for the American Foundation for Equal Rights, a non-profit organization funding the plaintiffs' legal team and sponsoring the play.

== Personal life ==
In 1989, Reilly met Allison Dickey, an independent film producer, in Thailand on the set of Casualties of War. They married in 1992. They have two sons, the elder of whom, Leo, is a musician, who performs under the name LoveLeo.

Reilly practices transcendental meditation.

== See also ==
- EGOT — People with four nominations
- Triple Crown of Acting – People with three nominations
- List of actors with Academy Award nominations
