= Morton Minsky =

American businessman (1902–1987)

- Born: January 10, 1902
- Died: March 23, 1987 (aged 85); Manhattan
- Known for: Minsky's Burlesque
- Spouse: Ruth Goldstein

Morton Minsky (January 10, 1902 – March 23, 1987) was an American burlesque owner, the last surviving of four brothers who had created Minsky's Burlesque in Manhattan.

== Biography ==
He was the youngest of the four Minsky brothers. They were Jewish. Morton joined the family business in 1924, after graduating from New York University. He later became involved in real estate in Manhattan. In 1967, he was senior vice president of Daniel A. Brener, Inc., where he headed their motion-picture theater sales and leasing division. He co-wrote Minsky's Burlesque in 1986. He died on March 24, 1987, of cancer at his home in Manhattan.

== Publications ==
- Minsky, Morton; Milt Machlin (1986). Minsky's Burlesque. Arbor House. ISBN 0-87795-743-6. "Minsky's Burlesque."
