= Cedar Rapids (film) =

2011 American comedy film

- Theatrical release poster
- Directed by: Miguel Arteta
- Written by: Phil Johnston
- Produced by: Jim Burke; Alexander Payne; Jim Taylor
- Starring: Ed Helms; John C. Reilly; Anne Heche; Isiah Whitlock Jr.; Sigourney Weaver
- Cinematography: Chuy Chávez
- Edited by: Eric Kissack
- Music by: Christophe Beck
- Production company: Ad Hominem Enterprises
- Distributed by: Fox Searchlight Pictures
- Release dates: January 23, 2011 (Sundance); February 11, 2011 (United States)
- Running time: 86 minutes
- Country: United States
- Language: English
- Box office: $7.7 million

Cedar Rapids is a 2011 American comedy film directed by Miguel Arteta. The script, written by Phil Johnston, was included on the 2009 Black List, a Hollywood list of the most popular unproduced screenplays of the year. The film stars Ed Helms, John C. Reilly, Anne Heche, Isiah Whitlock Jr., and Sigourney Weaver.

Cedar Rapids premiered at the 27th Sundance Film Festival on January 23, 2011, before being released by Fox Searchlight Pictures in the United States on February 11, 2011. The film received mostly positive reviews from critics and grossed $7.7 million.

== Plot ==
Tim Lippe, a naive and idealistic insurance agent from a small town in Wisconsin, attempts to give his former middle school teacher, Macy Vanderhei, a promise ring after they have casual sex. She rejects him, citing her recent divorce. A successful agent, Tim is sent to represent his company, Brownstar Insurance, at a regional conference in Cedar Rapids, Iowa, as a replacement for his co-worker, Roger Lemke, who died in an auto-erotic asphyxiation accident. Tim idolized Roger, believing that his death was merely an unfortunate accident, and that he embodied Christian values, the key criterion used to judge the winner of the coveted "Two Diamonds" award, which Roger won three years in a row.

Tim's boss, Bill, pressures him to win again to keep the company afloat. At the conference, Lippe meets fellow insurance agents Ronald Wilkes, Dean Ziegler, and Joan Ostrowski-Fox. He also meets Bree, a prostitute who works the parking lot in front of the hotel. She affectionately calls him "Butterscotch" after he offers her candy. Initially wary of the conference-goers, he spends more time with Ron, Dean, and Joan, and develops genuine friendships, including a crush on Joan. All the insurance agents participate in a scavenger hunt. Tim and Joan win, they bond over dinner, get intoxicated and join Dean in the hotel swimming pool. Tim and Joan begin kissing and are caught by Orin Helgesson, president of ASMI. Tim and Joan flee to her hotel room and have sex.

The next morning, Tim is guilt-ridden and calls Macy to confess, before desperately asking her to marry him. After rejecting him, she suggests to Tim that he take the opportunity to start a new life. Tim returns to Joan, who attempts to comfort him by telling him what Lemke was really like: a sexual deviant who bribed Helgesson for his awards. Tim refuses to believe this and leaves Joan's room.

He tells Dean about Lemke's alleged bribery and Dean swears secrecy. However, Dean encourages Tim to stand up to Helgesson during his assessment. During the assessment, Helgesson coerces Tim into bribing him for the award. Distraught, Tim comes across Bree and accompanies her to a party, where he gets high on methamphetamine and inadvertently starts a fight. Ron, Joan, and Dean rescue them.

At the hotel, Bill appears at Tim's door to inform him that with the successful acquisition of another Two Diamond award, he has sold the company which will result in the branch's closure. Ron, Joan, and Dean begin calling Tim's clients in an attempt to ensure their loyalty. On the final day of the conference, Bill formally announces the sale but Tim takes over the podium and reveals that his company has unethically acquired the award every year by bribing Helgesson and confesses to doing so himself. Helgesson flees the room and a furious Bill confronts Tim, his revelations having cost Bill the sale of his company. Tim responds by announcing his intention to leave the company and start another with his clients from Brownstar, 17 of which have agreed to stay with him. Bill storms off, dumbfounded.

As the four friends say their goodbyes and prepare to see each other next year, Joan and Tim are shown happy as friends, and Dean invites Ron and Tim to stay at a wealthy cousin's cabin in Canada for the summer; both of them surprise Dean by gleefully accepting. The three of them and Joan go on to start their own company.

== Cast ==
- Ed Helms as Tim Lippe
- John C. Reilly as Dean Ziegler
- Anne Heche as Joan Ostrowski-Fox
- Isiah Whitlock Jr. as Ronald Wilkes
- Stephen Root as Bill Krogstad
- Kurtwood Smith as Orin Helgesson
- Alia Shawkat as Bree
- Thomas Lennon as Roger Lemke
- Rob Corddry as Gary
- Mike O'Malley as Mike Pyle
- Sigourney Weaver as Macy Vanderhei
- Inga R. Wilson as Gwen Lemke
- Mike Birbiglia as Trent
- Seth Morris as Uncle Ken

== Production ==
The failure of an Iowa film production tax credit reportedly is the reason that the film was shot in Ann Arbor, Michigan, rather than on location in Cedar Rapids, Iowa, itself. Michigan provided a 42% tax rebate to movies filmed in specified "core communities" in the state (such as Ann Arbor).

In the film, Ronald Wilkes (Isiah Whitlock Jr.) is a self-described fan of the television series The Wire and does an impersonation of one of its most popular characters, Omar Little. Whitlock was involved in the HBO series portraying character Clay Davis, but has said the references to the show were written in before he was cast as Wilkes. Whitlock filmed a separate promotion for the film, where Wilkes is seen in an insurance office reading lines from The Wire.

== Reception ==
The film grossed $6,861,102 in the United States and Canada, and $867,834 in other territories, for a worldwide total of $7,728,936.

On the review aggregator website Rotten Tomatoes, 86% of 167 critics' reviews are positive, with an average rating of 6.7/10. The website's consensus reads: "It's as conventional as its Midwestern setting, but Cedar Rapids boasts a terrific cast and a script that deftly blends R-rated raunch and endearing sweetness." Metacritic, which uses a weighted average, assigned the film a score of 70 out of 100, based on 38 critics, indicating "generally favorable" reviews.
