= Milt Machlin =

American journalist, writer and adventurer (1924–2004)

- Machlin in Papua New Guinea, 1969
- Born: Milton R. Machlin; June 26, 1924; New York City, New York
- Died: April 3, 2004 (aged 79); New York City, New York
- Occupations: journalist, author

Milt Machlin (June 26, 1924 – April 3, 2004) was an American journalist, author and adventurer. He helped popularize the phrases "Bermuda Triangle" and "Abominable Snowman" and led an expedition to attempt to find Michael Rockefeller, who disappeared in New Guinea in 1961.

== Biography ==
Machlin was born in New York City in 1924. In 1943, after one year of college, he enlisted in the U.S. Army and served in the Asia Pacific theatre. After the war, he earned a degree from Brown University and a second degree from the Sorbonne in Paris, where his roommate was Irish poet Brendan Behan.

He began his career as a journalist for Agence France Presse then as an editor for adventure magazine Argosy. It was during his time at Argosy that helped popularize the phrases "The Bermuda Triangle" and "Abominable Snowman".

== Search for Rockefeller ==
In 1969, Machlin traveled to the jungles of Papua New Guinea in an attempt to learn the fate of Michael Rockefeller, son of then-New York Governor Nelson Rockefeller. Michael had vanished in 1961 on a trip to secure bisj poles for the Museum of Primitive Art, when his catamaran capsized and he was swept out to sea. While the Dutch anthropologist he was with stayed with the vessel awaiting help, Rockefeller attempted to swim in shark-infested waters to the coastline. The anthropologist was rescued the next day, but Rockefeller was never seen again.

Rockefeller was declared legally dead in 1964, but a rumor surfaced that he was still alive and held captive by a local tribe. Machlin traveled to Papua New Guinea searching for any trace of him. Following his trip, Machlin later published the book, The Search for Michael Rockefeller, in which he concluded that Rockefeller had indeed made it to shore only to be killed by headhunters.

== Legacy ==
Four years after Machlin's death, filmmaker Fraser C. Heston discovered 15 reels of 16 mm film from the 1969 trip, including Machlin's interviews with Dutch missionaries who had traveled from tribe to tribe and heard stories. Heston utilised the footage to create a documentary, also called The Search for Michael Rockefeller.

== Selected bibliography ==
- Machlin, Milt (1962). The Private Hell of Hemingway. New York.
- Machlin, Milt (1972). The Search for Michael Rockefeller. New York: G.P. Putnam's Sons.
- Machlin, Milt; Moore, Robin (1975). The Set Up: the Shocking Aftermath to The French Connection. Guildford: Lyons Press.
- Machlin, Milt (1980). Libby. New York: Tower Books. ISBN 9780505515339.
- Machlin, Milt (1991). Joshua's Altar: the Dig at Mount Ebal. New York: W. Morrow.
