= Expresso Bongo (EP) =

1960 EP by Cliff Richard and the Shadows

EP by Cliff Richard and the Shadows
- Released: 8 January 1960
- Recorded: 8 September & 19 October 1959
- Studios: EMI Studios, London
- Genres: Pop; rock and roll
- Length: 8:46
- Label: Columbia
- Producer: Norrie Paramor

Cliff Richard and the Shadows chronology
Cliff No. 2 (1959)	Expresso Bongo (1960)	Cliff Sings No. 1 (1960)

Expresso Bongo is an EP by Cliff Richard and the Shadows, released in January 1960. It contains all the songs by the group sung in the film of the same name in which Richard also stars.

== Recording and release ==
The EP features three songs sung by Cliff Richard and the Shadows and one, "Bongo Blues", being an instrumental solely by the Shadows. "Love" and "A Voice in the Wilderness" were recorded on 8 September 1959, whilst "The Shrine on the Second Floor" and "Bongo Blues" were recorded on 19 October 1959. They were all recorded at EMI Studios (later renamed Abbey Road Studios) with producer Norrie Paramor. The EP was advertised for release on 4 December 1959 in numerous magazines and newspapers. However, the release was postposed until 8 January 1960 to coincide with the nationwide release of the film on 11 January.

"A Voice in the Wilderness" was subsequently released as a single on 15 January 1960, peaking at number 2 on the UK Singles Chart for three weeks in February 1960. The EP and single versions of the song are different takes, with some subtle differences in vocals – the single version was recorded on 20 December 1959.

== Chart performance ==
The Expresso Bongo film was extremely successful upon its release in December 1959 and this significantly helped the subsequent EP. The EP entered the New Musical Express singles chart (the canonical official UK Singles Chart) in the third week of January, reaching its peak at number 14 three weeks later and leaving the top 30 chart after the final week of February (thus spending a total of seven weeks on the chart). As shown by the chart run, sales for the EP peaked in February. However, in the second week of March 1960, Record Retailer (whose top 50 singles chart became the canonical official chart) began publishing charts including an EP chart. Expresso Bongo topped the first EP chart for one week before being overtaken by Elvis Presley's Strictly Elvis for five weeks before regaining the top position. It spent a total of 28 weeks on the top 20 EP chart, leaving after the final week of September 1960.

On other charts in the UK, the EP saw varied success. On the Record Mirror Top 20 singles chart, the EP peaked at number 8; yet on the Disc Top 20 singles chart, it only peaked at number 19. It did not enter the Melody Maker singles chart as the magazine had published an EP chart since November 1959. In recognition of the number of advance orders, it entered this top 10 chart in the third week of December, topping it at the beginning of January 1960.

Within three months of its release, the EP had sold over 150,000 copies, which was five times more than the average EP hit sales.

== Track listing ==
Side A
No.	Title	Writer(s)	Length
1.	"Love"	Norrie Paramor; Bunny Lewis	2:24
2.	"A Voice in the Wilderness"	Paramor; Lewis	2:11

Side B
No.	Title	Writer(s)	Length
3.	"The Shrine on the Second Floor"	David Heneker; Julian More; Monty Norman	2:27
4.	"Bongo Blues"	Paramor	1:44
Total length:			8:46

== Personnel ==
- Cliff Richard – vocals
- Hank Marvin – lead guitar
- Bruce Welch – rhythm guitar
- Jet Harris – bass guitar
- Tony Meehan – drums

== Charts ==
On singles charts

Chart (1960)	Peak position
UK New Musical Express Top 30	14
UK Disc Top 20	19
UK Record Mirror Top 20	8

On EP charts

Chart (1960)	Peak position
UK Record Retailer Top 20	1
UK Melody Maker Top 10	1
