= List of number-one EPs in the United Kingdom =

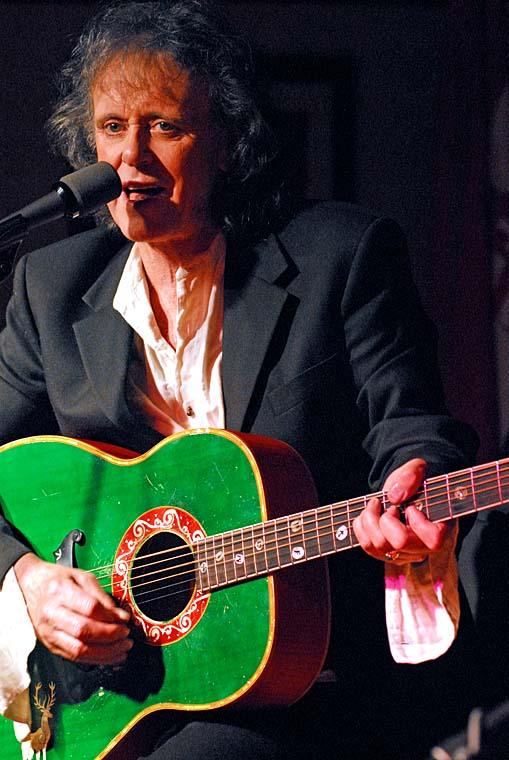
Donovan never had a number-one single or number-one album in his native UK; however, his The Universal Soldier EP spent eight weeks at the top of the EP chart.

In the 1950s and 1960s, a "third vinyl format" was introduced alongside long-playing (LP) albums, and singles. The extended play (EP) used the same formats as singles but contained more tracks. Singles were the popular record format at the time – predominantly 10-inch 78 rpm and 7-inch 45 rpm formats – and the first singles chart was published by the New Musical Express in 1952, with many other publications also producing singles charts in the 1950s and 1960s. Record Mirror published the first album chart in 1956, and when Record Retailer began compiling an LP chart on 12 March 1960, they also compiled an EP chart. The EP chart consisted of a top ten, and was expanded to fifteen positions the following week, and twenty the week after that.

EPs "died out in the late 1960s", and Record Retailer reduced the chart to ten positions on 16 April 1966, publishing the final EP chart on 16 December 1967. For six weeks in 1966 and two weeks in December 1967, Record Retailer did not publish EP charts, but they were compiled, and Record Mirror published them; Record Mirror had begun publishing charts compiled by Record Retailer in March 1962, following a decision to stop compiling their own albums and singles charts.

The longest consecutive duration at the top of the chart was 23 weeks for The Shadows' EP The Shadows to the Fore. The most weeks at number one was achieved by The Beach Boys' EP Hits, which spent 34 weeks there from June 1966, and was the incumbent number one when the chart ceased at the end of 1967. The Beatles had eight different EPs top the chart, as did The Shadows (four with Cliff Richard and four on their own). The Shadows spent 69 weeks with an EP on top of the chart in comparison to The Beatles' 63 weeks. Conversely, only four acts spent a total of one week atop the chart; Joan Baez, Jim Reeves, the George Mitchell Minstrels and Bobby Vee (with The Crickets). Although official music recording sales certifications were not introduced until the British Phonographic Industry was formed in 1973, Disc introduced an initiative in 1959 to present a silver disc to records selling over 250,000 units.

Seven EPs are recorded as going silver: The Beatles' number-one EPs Twist and Shout, The Beatles' Hits, All My Loving, Long Tall Sally, as well as The Beatles (No. 1) and Magical Mystery Tour (which did not reach number one but would have done so had the EP chart lasted only a few more weeks) and The Rolling Stones' number-one EP Five by Five.

== Number-one EPs ==
No.	Artist (Note: The artist, EP name, and number of consecutive weeks at number one are those given by Warwick, Kutner, and Brown in The Complete Book of The British Charts: Singles and Albums (3rd ed.).)	EP	Reached number one (Note: The date given is for the first week of a consecutive duration at number one. The date is "the Saturday of the relevant week" as given by Warwick, Kutner, and Brown in The Complete Book of The British Charts: Singles and Albums (3rd ed.). This may not coincide with the date Record Retailer was published; charts from 10 March 1960 until 8 June 1967 were week-ending on a Thursday and from 19 July 1967 until 23 July 1969 were week-ending on a Wednesday.)	Weeks at number one
1960
1	Cliff Richard and The Shadows	Expresso Bongo	12 March 1960	1
2	Elvis Presley	Strictly Elvis	19 March 1960	5
re	Cliff Richard and The Shadows	Expresso Bongo	23 April 1960	1
3	Paddy Roberts	Strictly for Grown Ups	30 April 1960	1
4	Emile Ford and the Checkmates	Emile	7 May 1960	1
re	Paddy Roberts	Strictly for Grown Ups	14 May 1960	1
re	Emile Ford and the Checkmates	Emile	21 May 1960	2
re	Paddy Roberts	Strictly for Grown Ups	4 June 1960	12
5	Paddy Roberts	Paddy Roberts Strikes Again	27 August 1960	2
re	Paddy Roberts	Strictly for Grown Ups	10 September 1960	1
6	Original Soundtrack	Highlights from South Pacific	17 September 1960	1
re	Paddy Roberts	Strictly for Grown Ups	24 September 1960	3
re	Original Soundtrack	Highlights from South Pacific	15 October 1960	3
re	Paddy Roberts	Strictly for Grown Ups	5 November 1960	1
re	Original Soundtrack	Highlights from South Pacific	12 November 1960	5
7	Adam Faith	Adam's Hit Parade	17 December 1960	1
8	Cliff Richard and The Shadows	Cliff's Silver Discs	24 December 1960	1
re	Original Soundtrack	Highlights from South Pacific	31 December 1960	1
1961
re	Cliff Richard and The Shadows	Cliff's Silver Discs	7 January 1961	2
re	Adam Faith	Adam's Hit Parade	21 January 1961	1
9	The Shadows	The Shadows	28 January 1961	17
re	Adam Faith	Adam's Hit Parade	27 May 1961	1
re	The Shadows	The Shadows	3 June 1961	3
10	The Shadows	The Shadows to the Fore	24 June 1961	23
11	Helen Shapiro	Helen	2 December 1961	9
1962
re	The Shadows	The Shadows to the Fore	3 February 1962	4
12	The Shadows	Spotlight on The Shadows	3 March 1962	3
13	Helen Shapiro	Helen's Hit Parade	24 March 1962	3
re	The Shadows	Spotlight on The Shadows	14 April 1962	5
re	The Shadows	The Shadows to the Fore	19 May 1962	1
re	Helen Shapiro	Helen's Hit Parade	26 May 1962	1
14	Cliff Richard and The Shadows	Hits from "The Young Ones"	2 June 1962	2
15	Elvis Presley	Follow That Dream	16 June 1962	20
16	The Shadows	The Boys	3 November 1962	3
17	Elvis Presley	Kid Galahad	24 November 1962	5
18	George Mitchell Minstrels	From The Black and White Minstrel Show	29 December 1962	1
1963
re	Elvis Presley	Kid Galahad	5 January 1963	11
19	Frank Ifield	Frank Ifield's Hits	23 March 1963	1
re	Elvis Presley	Kid Galahad	30 March 1963	1
re	Frank Ifield	Frank Ifield's Hits	6 April 1963	8
20	Bobby Vee and The Crickets	Just for Fun	1 June 1963	1
21	Cliff Richard and The Shadows	Holiday Carnival	8 June 1963	1
re	Frank Ifield	Frank Ifield's Hits	15 June 1963	2
re	Cliff Richard and The Shadows	Holiday Carnival	29 June 1963	1
re	Frank Ifield	Frank Ifield's Hits	6 July 1963	2
re	Cliff Richard and The Shadows	Holiday Carnival	20 July 1963	1
22	The Beatles	Twist and Shout	27 July 1963	10
23	The Searchers	Ain't Gonna Kiss Ya	5 October 1963	4
24	The Beatles	The Beatles' Hits	2 November 1963	3
re	The Beatles	Twist and Shout	23 November 1963	11
1964
25	The Rolling Stones	The Rolling Stones	8 February 1964	3
26	The Beatles	All My Loving	29 February 1964	8
re	The Rolling Stones	The Rolling Stones	25 April 1964	11
27	The Beatles	Long Tall Sally	11 July 1964	7
28	The Rolling Stones	Five by Five	29 August 1964	15
29	The Beatles	Extracts from the Film "A Hard Day's Night"	12 December 1964	2
30	The Bachelors	The Bachelors' Hits	26 December 1964	2
1965
re	The Beatles	Extracts from the Film "A Hard Day's Night"	9 January 1965	3
re	The Rolling Stones	Five by Five	30 January 1965	1
re	The Beatles	Extracts from the Film "A Hard Day's Night"	6 February 1965	1
re	The Rolling Stones	Five by Five	13 February 1965	1
31	The Kinks	Kinksize Session	20 February 1965	1
re	The Rolling Stones	Five by Five	27 February 1965	1
32	Val Doonican	The Green Shades of Val Doonican	6 March 1965	3
re	The Rolling Stones	Five by Five	27 March 1965	3
re	Val Doonican	The Green Shades of Val Doonican	17 April 1965	1
33	The Beatles	Beatles for Sale	24 April 1965	5
34	The Searchers	Bumble Bee	29 May 1965	2
re	The Beatles	Beatles for Sale	12 June 1965	1
35	Manfred Mann	The One in the Middle	19 June 1965	1
36	The Rolling Stones	Got Live If You Want It!	26 June 1965	1
re	Manfred Mann	The One in the Middle	3 July 1965	4
re	The Rolling Stones	Got Live If You Want It!	31 July 1965	1
re	Manfred Mann	The One in the Middle	7 August 1965	4
37	Donovan	The Universal Soldier	4 September 1965	8
38	The Kinks	Kwyet Kinks	30 October 1965	7
39	Manfred Mann	No Living Without Loving	18 December 1965	7
1966
40	The Beatles	The Beatles' Million Sellers	5 February 1966	2
41	The Seekers	The Seekers	19 February 1966	3
re	The Beatles	The Beatles' Million Sellers	12 March 1966	2
42	The Beatles	Yesterday	26 March 1966	8
43	Joan Baez	With God on our Side	21 May 1966	1
44	Manfred Mann	Machines	28 May 1966	1
45	The Beach Boys	Hits	4 June 1966	4
46	The Walker Brothers	I Need You	2 July 1966	10
re	The Beach Boys	Hits	10 September 1966	4
re	The Walker Brothers	I Need You	8 October 1966	3
re	The Beach Boys	Hits	29 October 1966	7
47	The Who	Ready Steady Who	17 December 1966	2
48	Jim Reeves	A Christmas Card from Jim	31 December 1966	1
1967
re	The Who	Ready Steady Who	7 January 1967	2
re	The Beach Boys	Hits	21 January 1967	7
49	The Seekers	Morningtown Ride	11 March 1967	1
50	Four Tops	Four Top Hits	18 March 1967	10
51	Paul Jones	Paul Jones Sings Songs from the Film Privilege	27 May 1967	3
re	Four Tops	Four Top Hits	17 June 1967	5
52	Elvis Presley	Easy Come, Easy Go	22 July 1967	3
re	The Beach Boys	Hits	12 August 1967	6
re	Four Tops	Four Top Hits	23 September 1967	1
re	The Beach Boys	Hits	30 September 1967	1
re	Four Tops	Four Top Hits	7 October 1967	1
re	The Beach Boys	Hits	14 October 1967	1
re	Four Tops	Four Top Hits	21 October 1967	5
re	The Beach Boys	Hits	25 November 1967	4

== By artist ==
The following artists achieved two or more number-one EPs. Artists The Beatles and The Shadows were the most successful acts of the decade in terms of number-one EPs, each having eight EPs reach the top of the chart. In total, The Shadows spent 69 weeks occupying the top of chart (59 weeks from 4 EPs as an instrumental group and 10 weeks from 4 EPs accompanying Cliff Richard) and The Beatles spent a total of 63 weeks at number one.

Artist	Number-one EPs	Total weeks
The Shadows	8	69
The Beatles	8	63
Elvis Presley	4	45
Cliff Richard	4	10
The Rolling Stones	3	37
Manfred Mann	3	17
Paddy Roberts	2	21
Helen Shapiro	2	13
The Kinks	2	8
The Searchers	2	6
The Seekers	2	4
