= Helen Shapiro discography =

- Studio albums: 18
- EPs: 7
- Compilation albums: 20
- Singles: 43

This is the discography of British singer Helen Shapiro.

== Albums ==
=== Studio albums ===
Title	Album details	Peak chart positions	
Title	Album details	UK	GER
'Tops' with Me	Released: March 1962; Label: Columbia	2	22
Helen's Sixteen	Released: April 1963; Label: Columbia	—	—
Helen in Nashville	Released: October 1963; Label: Columbia	—	—
Helen Hits Out!	Released: November 1964; Label: Columbia	—	—
All for the Love of Music	Released: 1978; Label: Decca; Germany-only release	—	—
Straighten Up and Fly Right	Released: July 1983; Label: Oval	—	—
Echoes of the Duke	Released: April 1985; Label: Calligraph; With Humphrey Lyttelton	—	—
The Quality of Mercer	Released: 29 June 1987; Label: Calligraph	—	—
I Can't Get Started	Released: 1990; Label: Calligraph; With Humphrey Lyttelton	—	—
The Pearl	Released: 1990; Label: Manna Music	—	—
I Want To See You	Released: 23 October 1991; Label: Overseas; Japan-only release	—	—
Kadosh	Released: 1992; Label: Manna Music	—	—
Nothing but the Best	Released: 1995; Label: ICC	—	—
Enter into His Gates	Released: 1997; Label: Manna Music	—	—
Sing Swing Together	Released: 1998; Label: Calligraph; With Humphrey Lyttelton	—	—
By Request	Released: 1998; Label: Katalyst	—	—
Simply Shapiro	Released: March 2000; Label: Katalyst	—	—
What Wondrous Love Is This	Released: 10 February 2010; Label: Manna Music	—	—
"—" denotes releases that did not chart or were not released in that territory.

=== Compilation albums ===
Title	Album details
12 Hits and a Miss	Released: 1 April 1963; Label: Capitol; Originally only released in Canada; released in the UK in 1965
A Teenager in Love	Released: October 1963; Label: Epic; US-only release
Greatest Hits	Released: 1973; Label: Odeon; Japan-only release
The Very Best of Helen Shapiro	Released: August 1974; Label: Columbia
The Hits of Helen Shapiro	Released: 1983; Label: EMI; Netherlands-only release
25th Anniversary Album	Released: February 1986; Label: Music for Pleasure
The E.P. Collection	Released: July 1989; Label: See for Miles
The Best of the EMI Years	Released: July 1991; Label: EMI
The Very Best of Helen Shapiro	Released: November 1993; Label: Fat Boy
Sensational – The Uncollected Helen Shapiro	Released: November 1995; Label: RPM
The Essential Collection	Released: 13 October 1997; Label: EMI
Helen Shapiro at Abbey Road 1961–1967	Released: 23 February 1998; Label: EMI
The Gospel Collection	Released: July 2002; Label: Manna Music
The Ultimate Helen Shapiro	Released: 21 April 2003; Label: EMI
A's B's & EP's	Released: 5 May 2003; Label: EMI
The Very Best of Helen Shapiro	Released: 2 May 2005; Label: EMI
The Ultimate Helen Shapiro	Released: 7 February 2011; Label: EMI
You Don't Know – All the Hits 1961–1962	Released: 8 January 2016; Label: Jasmine
The Very Best of Helen Shapiro	Released: 17 June 2016; Label: Not Now
Face The Music – The Complete Singles 1967–1984	Released: 28 August 2020; Label: Ace

== EPs ==
Title (Note: This is a list of EPs released in the UK. Various other EPs were released elsewhere.)	Details	Peak chart positions
Title	Details	UK
Helen	Released: November 1961; Label: Columbia	1
Helen's Hit Parade	Released: January 1962; Label: Columbia	1
More Hits from Helen	Released: August 1962; Label: Columbia	12
A Teenager Sings the Blues	Released: September 1962; Label: Columbia	15
Even More Hits from Helen	Released: November 1962; Label: Columbia	—
'Tops' with Me (No. 1)	Released: 1 March 1963; Label: Columbia	—
'Tops' with Me (No. 2)	Released: May 1963; Label: Columbia	—
"—" denotes releases that did not chart.

== Singles ==
Title	Year	Peak chart positions											Label	Album
Title	Year	UK	AUS	BEL (FL)	BEL (WA)	GER	IRE	NL	NOR	NZ	Canada	US	Label	Album
"Don't Treat Me Like a Child" b/w "When I'm with You"	1961	3	90	—	—	—	6	—	—	4	—	—	Columbia	Non-album singles
"You Don't Know" b/w "Marvellous Lie"	1961	1	50	7	4	—	1	15	2	1	—	—	Columbia	Non-album singles
"Walkin' Back to Happiness" b/w "Kiss 'n' Run"	1961	1	6	2	13	30	1	3	3	1	—	100	Columbia	Non-album singles
"Goody Goody" (France and Belgium-only release) b/w "After You've Gone"	1962	—	—	—	—	—	—	—	—	—	—	—	Columbia	Helen (EP)
"Tell Me What He Said" b/w "I Apologise"	1962	2	46	—	30	31	3	—	5	4	—	—	Columbia	Non-album singles
"When I'm with You" (Japan-only release) b/w "The Young Ones" (by Cliff Richard and the Shadows)	1962	—	—	—	—	—	—	—	—	—	—	—	Columbia	Non-album singles
"Let's Talk About Love" b/w "Sometime Yesterday"	1962	23	31	—	—	—	—	—	—	—	37	—	Columbia	Non-album singles
"Sweet Nothin's" (Japan-only release) b/w "Little Devil"	1962	—	—	—	—	—	—	—	—	—	—	—	Columbia	'Tops' with Me
"Little Miss Lonely" b/w "I Don't Care"	1962	8	28	—	—	—	7	—	—	9	— 4	—	Columbia	Non-album singles
"Keep Away from Other Girls" b/w "Cry My Heart Out"	1962	40	42	—	—	—	—	—	—	—	—	—	Columbia	Non-album singles
"A Teenager Sings the Blues" (Netherlands-only release) b/w "Blues in the Night"	1963	—	—	—	—	—	—	—	—	—	—	—	Columbia	Non-album singles
"Queen for Tonight" b/w "Daddy Couldn't Get Me One of Those"	1963	33	97	—	—	—	—	29	—	—	—	—	Columbia	Non-album singles
"Woe Is Me" b/w "I Walked Right In (With My Eyes Wide Open)"	1963	35	91	—	—	—	—	—	—	—	—	—	Columbia	Helen in Nashville
"Not Responsible" b/w "No Trespassing"	1963	—	1	—	—	—	—	—	—	—	—	—	Columbia	Helen in Nashville
"Look Who It Is" b/w "Walking in My Dreams" (from Helen's Sixteen)	1963	47	33	44	—	—	—	—	—	6	—	—	Columbia	Non-album singles
"Schlafen kann ich nie (I Cried Myself To Sleep Last Night)" (Germany-only release) b/w "Glaube mir, Jonny (Tearaway Johnny)"	1963	—	—	—	—	—	—	—	—	—	—	—	Columbia	Non-album singles
"Fever" b/w "Ole Father Time"	1964	38	—	—	—	—	—	—	—	—	—	—	Columbia	Non-album singles
"Look Over Your Shoulder" b/w "You Won't Come Home"	1964	—	—	—	—	—	—	—	—	—	—	—	Columbia	Non-album singles
"Shop Around" b/w "He Knows How to Love Me" (Non-album track)	1964	—	—	—	—	—	—	—	—	—	—	—	Columbia	Helen Hits Out!
"I Wish I'd Never Loved You" b/w "I Was Only Kidding"	1964	—	—	—	—	—	—	—	—	—	—	—	Columbia	Non-album singles
"Tomorrow Is Another Day" b/w "It's So Funny I Could Cry"	1965	—	—	—	—	—	—	—	—	—	—	—	Columbia	Non-album singles
"Here in Your Arms" b/w "Only Once"	1965	—	—	—	—	—	—	—	—	—	—	—	Columbia	Non-album singles
"Sag, daß es schön ist" (Germany-only release) b/w "Rote Rosen und Vergißmeinnicht"	1965	—	—	—	—	—	—	—	—	—	—	—	Columbia	Non-album singles
"Something Wonderful" b/w "Just a Line"	1965	—	—	—	—	—	—	—	—	—	—	—	Columbia	Non-album singles
"Forget About the Bad Things" b/w "Wait a Little Longer"	1966	—	—	—	—	—	—	—	—	—	—	—	Columbia	Non-album singles
"Ich such mir meinen Bräutigam alleine aus" (Germany-only release) b/w "Ein Weg zu deinem Herzen (Wait a Little Longer)"	1966	—	—	—	—	—	—	—	—	—	—	—	Columbia	Non-album singles
"In My Calendar" b/w "Empty House"	1966	—	—	—	—	—	—	—	—	—	—	—	Columbia	Non-album singles
"Make Me Belong to You" b/w "The Way of the World"	1967	—	—	—	—	—	—	—	—	—	—	—	Columbia	Non-album singles
"She Needs Company" b/w "Stop and You Will Become Aware"	1967	—	—	—	—	—	—	—	—	—	—	—	Columbia	Non-album singles
"You'll Get Me Loving You" b/w "Silly Boy (I Love You)"	1968	—	—	—	—	—	—	—	—	—	—	—	Pye	Non-album singles
"Today Has Been Cancelled" b/w "Face the Music"	1969	—	49	—	—	—	—	—	—	—	—	—	Pye	Non-album singles
"You've Guessed" b/w "Take Me for a While"	1969	—	98	—	—	—	—	—	—	—	—	—	Pye	Non-album singles
"Take Down a Note Miss Smith" b/w "Couldn't You See"	1970	—	—	—	—	—	—	—	—	—	—	—	Pye	Non-album singles
"Das ist nicht die feine englische Art" (Germany-only release) b/w "Ein Weg zu deinem Herzen (Wait a Little Longer)"	1970	—	—	—	—	—	—	—	—	—	—	—	Pye	Non-album singles
"Waiting on the Shores of Nowhere" b/w "A Glass of Wine"	1970	—	—	—	—	—	—	—	—	—	—	—	Pye	Non-album singles
"The Prophet" (both sides by Ella Stone (Helen Shapiro) and Moss (Al Saxon) b/w "Now or Never"	1972	—	—	—	—	—	—	—	—	—	—	—	Phoenix	Non-album singles
"You're a Love Child" b/w "That's the Reason I Love You"	1975	—	—	—	—	—	—	—	—	—	—	—	DJM	Non-album singles
"If You Feel He Cares" (recorded under the pseudonym "Sweet Thing") b/w "It Only Hurts When I Love"	1976	—	—	—	—	—	—	—	—	—	—	—	Magnet	Non-album singles
"Can't Break the Habit" b/w "For All the Wrong Reasons"	1977	—	—	—	—	—	—	—	—	—	—	—	Arista	All for the Love of Music
"Every Little Bit Hurts" b/w "Touchin' Wood"	1978	—	—	—	—	—	—	—	—	—	—	—	Arista	All for the Love of Music
"Let Yourself Go" b/w "Funny"	1983	—	—	—	—	—	—	—	—	—	—	—	Oval	Straighten Up and Fly Right
"Brickyard Blues" b/w "Just Another Weekend"	1984	—	—	—	—	—	—	—	—	—	—	—	Oval	Non-album singles
"Walking Back to Happiness" (both sides re-recordings) b/w "Let's Talk About Love"	1989	—	—	—	—	—	—	—	—	—	—	—	Calligraph	Non-album singles
"—" denotes releases that did not chart or were not released in that territory.
