= The Shadows No. 3 =

EP by The Shadows
- Released: 1961
- Genre: Rock
- Label: Columbia/EMI

The Shadows chronology
The Shadows No. 2 (1961)	The Shadows No. 3 (1961)	Spotlight on The Shadows (1962)

The Shadows No. 3 is an extended play 45 rpm record released in 1961 by The Shadows. It was released on Columbia Records/EMI Records as SEG 8166 in mono and reached #13 in the UK EP charts in August 1962 and stayed on the chart for 4 weeks. The cover picture is the same as The Shadows album cover.

All the songs on the record had previously been released on the album The Shadows, and more songs from the album had already been released on the EP The Shadows No. 2. There appears never to have been a The Shadows No. 1.

== Track listing ==
Side 1

1. "All My Sorrows" (Dave Guard, Bob Shane, Nick Reynolds)
2. "Stand Up and Say That!" (Hank Marvin)

Side 2

1. "Gonzales" (Robyn McGlynn)
2. "Big Boy" (Bruce Welch, Marvin)

Robyn McGlynn, the author of "Gonzales" was a pseudonym of Peter Gormley whose daughter was named Robyn.

The liner notes were written by Cliff Richard.

== Personnel ==
- Hank Marvin – lead guitar, vocals
- Bruce Welch – rhythm guitar
- Tony Meehan – drums
- Jet Harris – bass guitar
- Norrie Paramor – recording manager
