= Strictly for Grown Ups =

EP by Paddy Roberts
- Released: 1959
- Genre: Jazz
- Language: English
- Label: Decca Records

Strictly for Grown Ups is an EP by Paddy Roberts, released in 1959. The EP is a 7-inch vinyl record and released in mono with the catalogue number DFE 6584. Strictly for Grown Ups was the UK number-one EP for 19 weeks, having 6 stints at number one (the longest being 12 weeks) between April and November 1960.

== Track listing ==
Side A

1. "The Ballad Of Bethnal Green" (Paddy Roberts)
2. "L'Anglais Avec Son Sang-Froid" (Roberts)

Side B

3. "Follow Me" (Roberts)
4. "Love Isn't What It Used to Be" (Roberts)

== Background ==
All four songs were included on the LP of the same name. None of the tracks were released as singles in the UK.

== Chart performance ==
Beginning in 1960s, in addition to publishing a long play (LP) chart, Record Retailer also ran an EP chart. Strictly for Grown Ups was released in 1959 and became a number-one EP on 30 April 1960. Replacing Cliff Richard and The Shadows' EP Expresso Bongo at the top of the chart, it stayed there for one week, was replaced by Emile Ford's eponymous EP Emile, regained the top spot the following week, before being kept of the chart for another two weeks by Emile. Strictly For Grown Ups returned for a 12-week stint at number one beginning in June, was dislodged by another Roberts' EP (Paddy Roberts Strikes Again) for two weeks. From September to November, spent a further five weeks at number one in three stints each time being replaced and replacing the Highlights from South Pacific soundtrack.
