= Syndicate Blackpool =

Former UK theatre, cinema & nightclub

The Syndicate Night Club
- ABC Theatre, ABC Cinema, Cannon Cinema, MGM Cinema
- The Syndicate logo

- Location in Blackpool
- Address: 130–140 Church Street; Blackpool, Lancashire; England
- Coordinates: 53.8182°N 3.0488°W
- Owner: Nexum Leisure
- Capacity: (ABC): 1934 (The Syndicate): 4300 (est.)
- Type: Music
- Current use: Music, club, events

Construction
- Opened: 2002
- Closed: 2011
- Rebuilt: 1958
- Years active: (As the ABC Theatre): 1963–1981 (As a cinema): 1981–2000 (As The Syndicate): 2002–2011
- Architect: C.J. Foster

Website
- www.thesyndicate.com

The Syndicate was a superclub and music venue in Blackpool, Lancashire, England. It was the largest nightclub in North West England, and claimed to be the largest nightclub in the United Kingdom. The club opened in December 2002 and had at the time of closing, three levels of floor space, three segmented rooms, and a VIP floor. It had a capacity of 5,000 if including the club 'status', which was part of the building but was advertised as a second nightclub in the earlier years. Otherwise, the capacity was 4,500, with a 2,200 capacity in the downstairs section, and a 2,300 capacity in the higher levels. The higher floors were tiered, with the VIP section being at the top of the tier overlooking a balcony section below which itself overlooked the dancefloor. The dance floor area had a revolving dance floor in the middle of it. This whole upper section of floors was a single open space and was named the 'Dance Arena'.

== History ==
=== Empire and Hippodrome ===
The site was originally occupied by the Empire variety theatre and ballroom that was designed by John Dent Harker and opened on 4 July 1895. It was renamed the Hippodrome in 1900 and used as a circus, but ten years later was converted to a cinema.

=== ABC Theatre ===
The former Hippodrome Theatre was bought by Associated British Cinemas (ABC) in April 1929. They planned to rebuild it in 1939, which was halted by the outbreak of World War II. The old theatre closed in 1960. Most of the building was then demolished and the new ABC Theatre was built in the shell of the old building with stalls and circle seating with a capacity of 1,934. It also had a permanent revolving stage.

The ABC Theatre opened on 31 May 1963 with the Holiday Carnival summer season stage show which starred Cliff Richard and The Shadows. It was used for stage shows during the summer months with films and concerts in the winter. ABC Cinemas' sister company ABC Weekend TV televised their Blackpool Night Out show from the theatre which starred the likes of Freddie Davies, Mike & Bernie Winters and Pearl Carr & Teddy Johnson.

The Beatles played a concert there in 1963 and in August 1965 they played on ABC Weekend TV's Blackpool Night Out. It was the first time they had played the song "Yesterday" on British television; the gig has surfaced on the video sharing website YouTube. Four songs they sang live at the gig appeared on the Anthology 2 compilation album in 1996 – "I Feel Fine", "Ticket to Ride", "Yesterday" and "Help!". The Beatles were also shown singing "Help" at the ABC in Episode four of the 1995 The Beatles Anthology documentary series.

The summer shows starred the likes of Frank Ifield, Cilla Black, Morecambe and Wise, and Tommy Steele.

=== ABC Cinema ===
In January 1981, the theatre closed and was converted into a triple screen cinema which reopened on 30 April 1981, although the revolving stage was retained together with the orchestra pit, original proscenium and front stalls and dressing rooms, though hidden behind the screens. The circle was used for one screen with the stalls divided into two screens.

It was renamed the Cannon Cinema in 1986, the MGM Cinema in May 1993 before reverting to the ABC name. It closed as a cinema in July 2000.

=== The Syndicate ===
The ABC building was bought in the summer of 2001 for about £4million by local entrepreneurs Mike and Sandra Nordwind and converted into the Syndicate nightclub. It opened in December 2002, with none of the original interior remaining.

The club was closed for a month in October 2005 when it lost its late night drinks licence in court, after Blackpool Police had presented a dossier of alleged violence at the club, which magistrates decided was so serious they withdrew the licence to sell alcohol after 11:00 pm. The club re-opened on 26 November after agreeing to withdraw their application for a new 4 am licence.

After the club closed in January 2006 following the refusal of a 4am licence, it was bought in May by national operator Nexum Leisure who undertook a £1m refurbishment of the venue. In June 2007 the venue launched a weekly Polish Night (Polska Noc) aimed at the resorts Polish and Eastern European population.

On 7 September 2008, John Robb the vocalist in the punk rock band Goldblade who co-founded The Membranes in Blackpool in 1977 and who also works as a journalist and television pundit, hosted a special event entitled "A Celebration of Music, Fashion & Football 1975–1995" at the Syndicate, with guest speakers Andy Nicholls, Shane Meadows and former Inspiral Carpets musician Clint Boon.

On 14 September 2008 the Syndicate staged a boxing event with American former world heavyweight champion, Tim Witherspoon making a guest appearance. Eric "Butterbean" Esch took on Mark Potter for the European Boxing Federation Heavyweight title.

The Syndicate closed on 10 August 2011, posting a closing notice on Facebook. The building was later demolished in 2014.
