= The Shadows No. 2 =

EP by The Shadows
- Released: 1961
- Genre: Rock
- Label: Columbia/EMI

The Shadows chronology
The Shadows to the Fore (1961)	The Shadows No. 2 (1961)	The Shadows No. 3 (1961)

The Shadows No. 2 is an extended play 45 rpm record released in 1961 by The Shadows. It was released on Columbia Records/EMI Records as SEG 8148 in mono and reached #12 in the UK EP charts in January, 1962 and stayed on the charts for 16 weeks.

All the songs on the record had previously been released on the album The Shadows, and more songs from the album were to be released on the EP The Shadows No. 3. There appears never to have been a The Shadows No. 1, though this could simply be a nickname for the first Shadows EP, which doesn't include any songs from the album.

The liner notes were written by Cliff Richard.

== Track listing ==
Side 1

1. "Shadoogie" (Hank Marvin, Bruce Welch, Jet Harris, Tony Meehan)
2. "Nivram" (Marvin, Welsh, Harris)

Side 2

1. "Baby My Heart" (Sonny Curtis)
2. "See You in My Drums" (Meeham)

== Personnel ==
- Hank Marvin – lead guitar, piano, vocals
- Bruce Welch – rhythm guitar
- Tony Meehan – drums
- Jet Harris – bass guitar
- Norrie Paramor – recording manager
