= The Shadows to the Fore =

EP by The Shadows
- Released: May 1961
- Genre: Rock, pop
- Language: English
- Label: EMI Columbia

The Shadows chronology
The Shadows (1961)	The Shadows to the Fore (1961)	The Shadows No. 2 (1961)
- (released in mono only).

The Shadows to the Fore was an EP by The Shadows, released in May 1961. The EP was released as a 7-inch vinyl record in mono with the catalogue number Columbia SEG 8094. The Shadows to the Fore was the UK number-one EP for 28 weeks, having three separate stints at the top of the chart from June 1961 until May 1962.

== Track listing ==
Side A

1. "Apache" (Jerry Lordan)
2. "Man of Mystery" (Theme music of the Edgar Wallace film series) (Michael Carr)

Side B

3. "The Stranger" (Bill Crompton, Morgan Jones)
4. "F.B.I." (Peter Gormley) NB a deliberate pseudonym for Marvin, Welch and Harris.

== Background ==
Each of the four tracks contained on the EP had been released as singles. In the UK all charted on the Record Retailer chart: "Apache" had spent five weeks at number one in 1960, "Man of Mystery"/"The Stranger" was released as a double A-side the same year and peaked at number five, and "F.B.I." peaked at number six following release in February 1961.

According to Mike Read's "The Story of the Shadows" the A side hit Single (no.4) and EP track "FBI" was in fact written by Hank Marvin, Bruce Welch and Jet Harris but for reasons which were never recorded for posterity this track was published through Peter Gormley their manager who redirected the earnings from this track to messrs Marvin, Welch and Harris. The Shadows were the first British band (ahead of the Beatles) to write some of their own material for singles and by 1961 some album tracks and again in 1962. By early 1961 The Shadows set up their own music publishing company at no 17 Savile Row in Central London and then followed a string of other booklets containing several song/instrumentals numbering nos 1 to 8 until their Marvin Welch & Farrar career break in 1970.

All tracks featured on the 1961 South African album Rockin' Guitars with "F.B.I." recorded live in Johannesburg. In the UK, all tracks featured on the compilation LP The Shadows' Greatest Hits released on the Columbia label in 1963.

== Chart performance ==
Beginning in 1960s, in addition to publishing a long play (LP) chart, Record Retailer also ran an EP chart. The Shadows to the Fore was released in May 1961 and became a number-one EP on 24 June 1961, replacing their own eponymous EP. It stayed at the top for 23 weeks, a record consecutive duration as number-one EP, before being displaced by Helen Shapiro's EP Helen. The Shadows to the Fore reclaimed the top spot from Shapiro on 3 February 1962, spending another four weeks there until displaced by another of their EPs, Spotlight On The Shadows. The Shadows to the Fore returned for a third and final stint at number one for a solitary week on 19 May. In total, The Shadows to the Fore amassed 28 weeks at the top of the EP chart.

== Personnel ==
- Hank Marvin – lead guitar
- Bruce Welch – rhythm guitar
- Jet Harris – bass guitar
- Tony Meehan – drums
