= Let's Talk About Love (disambiguation) =

Let's Talk About Love is a 1997 album by Celine Dion.

Let's Talk About Love may also refer to:

== Music ==
- Let's Talk About Love (EP), by Seungri, 2013
- Let's Talk About Love (3rd Avenue album), 1992
- Let's Talk About Love (Modern Talking album), 1985
- "Let's Talk About Love", a 1962 song by Helen Shapiro

== Other uses ==
- Let's Talk About Love (film), by Jean-Claude Lord, 1976
- Let's Talk About Love (novel), by Claire Kann, 2018
- "Parlez Moi D'Amour (Let's Talk About Love)", a 1982 song by June Pointer

== See also ==
- Parlez-moi d'amour (disambiguation), speak to me about love in French
- Speak to me of love (disambiguation)
- "Let's Talk About Sex", a 1991 song by Salt-n-Pepa
