= Adam's Hit Parade =

EP by Adam Faith
- Released: December 1960
- Genre: Pop
- Language: English
- Label: Parlophone
- Producer: John Barry

Adam's Hit Parade is an EP by Adam Faith, released in December 1960. The EP is a 7-inch vinyl record and released in mono with the catalogue number Parlophone Company GEP 8811. Adam's Hit Parade has the distinction of being the UK's number-one EP on three occasions. It first reached the number-one spot on December 17, 1960, but was bumped out a week later by Cliff Richard and the Shadows's Cliff's Silver Discs. On January 21, 1961, Faith reclaimed the top spot, only to be replaced a week later by the Shadows' The Shadows EP, which held the top slot until Faith regained it for a week on May 27, 1961.

Faith is backed by John Barry and His Orchestra.

== Track listing ==
Side A

1. "What Do You Want" (Vandyke), a No. 1 in the UK
2. "Poor Me" (Vandyke), also a No. 1 in the UK

Side B

1. "Someone Else's Baby" (Vandyke-Ford) – No. 2 in the UK
2. "Johnny Comes Marching Home" (from the film Never Let Go) (trad. arr. Barry-Maitland), reached #5 in the UK.

None of these songs charted in the United States.
