= Spotlight on The Shadows =

EP by The Shadows
- Released: February 1962
- Genre: Pop
- Language: English
- Label: EMI Columbia

Spotlight on The Shadows is an EP by The Shadows, released in February 1962. The EP is a 7-inch vinyl record and released in mono with the catalogue number Columbia SEG 8135. Spotlight on The Shadows was the UK number-one EP for 8 weeks, having two separate stints at the top of the chart from March to May 1962.

== Track listing ==
Side A

1. "The Frightened City" (from the film The Frightened City) (Norrie Paramor)
2. "Kon-Tiki" (Michael Carr)

Side B

3. "Peace Pipe" (from the A .B. P. C. film The Young Ones) (Paramor)
4. "The Savage" (from the A .B. P. C. film The Young Ones) (Paramor)

== Background ==
Three of the four tracks were written by Norrie Paramor, who was The Shadows' recording manager at Columbia Records. The two tracks from the film The Young Ones, which starred Cliff Richard, were written specifically for the group. "The Frightened City" was scored as the titular theme for the film of the same name and later recorded by The Shadows.

Three tracks off the EP had been released in the UK as singles and entered the Record Retailer chart: "The Frightened City" was released in May 1961 peaking at number three, "Kon-Tiki" spent one week at number one in October, and "The Savage" was released in November peaking at number ten. All four tracks featured on the compilation LP The Shadows' Greatest Hits released on the Columbia label in 1963.

== Chart performance ==
Beginning in 1960s, in addition to publishing a long play (LP) chart, Record Retailer also ran an EP chart. Spotlight on The Shadows was released in February 1962 and became a number-one EP on 3 March 1962. Replacing their second EP, The Shadows to the Fore, at the top of the chart they stayed there for three weeks. Helen Shapiro's Helen's Hit Parade displaced them for three weeks but they reclaimed the top spot on 14 April 1962 and stayed there for five weeks. In total, Spotlight on The Shadows amassed 8 weeks at the top of the EP chart.

== Personnel ==
- Hank Marvin – lead guitar
- Bruce Welch – rhythm guitar
- Jet Harris – bass guitar
- Tony Meehan – drums
