= Parlez-moi d'amour =

Parlez-moi d'amour (French: speak to me about love) may refer to:

== Music ==
- "Parlez-moi d'amour" (song), a 1930 French song by Jean Lenoir, considered a French standard, the classic recording sung by Lucienne Boyer
- "Parlez Moi D'Amour (Let's Talk About Love)", a 1989 song by June Pointer off the eponymous album June Pointer

== Film ==
- Speak to Me of Love (film; French: Parlez-moi d'amour), a 2002 French drama film starring Sophie Marceau
- Parlez-moi d'amour (film), a 1983 film by Patrick Conrad
- Speak to Me of Love (1975 film) (French: Parlez-moi d'amour), a 1975 French drama film
- Che femmina... e che dollari! (film), also released as Parlez-moi d'amour, a 1961 film starring Dalida
- Speak to Me of Love (1935 film) (French: Parlez-moi d'amour), a 1935 French comedy film

== See also ==
- Let's Talk About Love (Parlez-nous d'amour), a 1976 film by Jean-Claude Lord
- Let's Talk About Love (disambiguation)
- Speak to me of love (disambiguation)
