= The Boys (The Shadows EP) =

EP by The Shadows
- Released: October 1962
- Genre: Pop
- Language: English
- Label: EMI Columbia

The Boys is an EP by The Shadows, released in October 1962. The EP is a 7-inch vinyl record and released in mono with the catalogue number Columbia SEG 8193. Also known as Theme music from The Boys or Theme music from the Galaworldfilm Production "The Boys", the EP was the UK number-one EP for 3 weeks in November 1962.

== Track listing ==
Side A

1. "Theme from The Boys" (Brian Bennett, Bruce Welch, Hank Marvin)
2. "The Girls" (Welch, Marvin)

Side B

3. "Sweet Dreams" (Bill McGuffie)
4. "The Boys" (Bennett, Welch, Marvin)

== Background ==
The 1962 film The Boys was produced by Galaworldfilm Productions. The Shadows recorded the soundtrack and the production company is namechecked on the record sleeve of the EP which is titled Theme music from the Galaworldfilm Production "The Boys". All four tracks were recorded under the supervision of Norrie Paramor.

None of the tracks were released as singles in the UK. However, the Kent Music Report retrospectively placed "The Boys"/"The Girls" as the Australian number-one single in February 1963. In Italy, the tracks "The Boys" and "Theme from The Boys" were released as a double A-side called "Tema Dal Film: The Boys" (Columbia SCMQ 1619) and in Denmark and Norway, the tracks "The Boys" and "Sweet Dreams" were released as a double A-side single (Columbia DD 755).

"The Boys" featured on the compilation LP The Shadows' Greatest Hits released on the Columbia label in 1963. "Theme from The Boys" first featured on an album on the 1976 Rarities LP (EMI EMD 06 250). All four tracks featured on the same release in 1991 on the CD box set The Early Years 1959–1966.

== Chart performance ==
Beginning in 1960s, in addition to publishing a long play (LP) chart, Record Retailer also ran an EP chart. The Boys was released in October 1962 and became a number-one EP on 3 November 1962. Replacing Elvis Presley's EP Follow That Dream at the top of the chart, it stayed there for three weeks before being replaced by another Presley EP, Kid Galahad.

== Personnel ==
- Hank Marvin - lead guitar
- Bruce Welch - rhythm guitar
- Brian Bennett - drums
- Brian Locking - bass guitar
