= The Beatles' cedar tree =

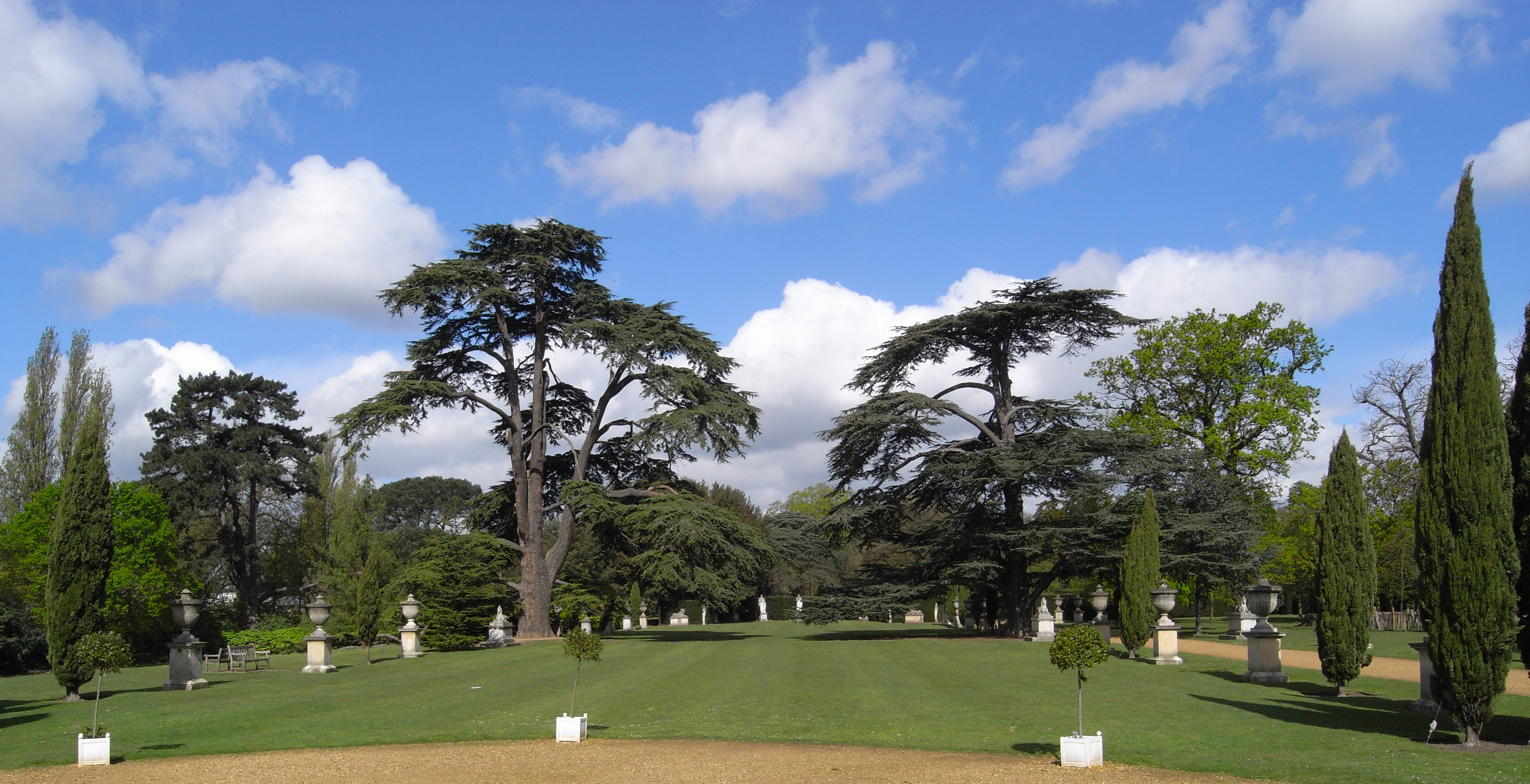
Cedar trees in the grounds of Chiswick House

The Beatles' cedar tree is a tree in the grounds of Chiswick House in West London.

It was one of ten trees nominated for the 2025 Tree of the Year award.

The tree is a cedar tree (Cedrus libani) in the grounds of Chiswick House and is believed to have been planted in the 1720s.

In 1966 The Beatles visited Chiswick House to make films for their single "Paperback Writer" and its B side, "Rain". The films have been considered precursors to the modern music video. The Beatles are shown playing guitars under the boughs of the tree. A photograph of the band by Bob Whitaker under the tree was used as the cover art for their EP Nowhere Man.

== See also ==
- List of individual trees
