= Beatles for Sale No. 2 =

EP by the Beatles
- Released: 4 June 1965
- Studios: EMI, London
- Genre: Folk rock
- Length: 8:30
- Label: Parlophone
- Producer: George Martin

The Beatles EP chronology
Beatles for Sale (1965)	Beatles for Sale No. 2 (1965)	The Beatles' Million Sellers (1965)

Professional ratings
Review scores
Source	Rating
AllMusic	4/5 stars

Beatles for Sale No. 2 is an EP by the English rock band the Beatles, released on 4 June 1965. It continued the first Beatles for Sale EP, including four more tracks from their parent album. The EP was only released in mono. Its catalogue number is Parlophone GEP 8938. It was also released in Australia, where "Words of Love, which had already been released on the previous EP, was replaced by "Kansas City/Hey, Hey, Hey, Hey.

== Track listing ==
All songs written and composed by Lennon-McCartney, except 'Words of Love', which was written and composed by Buddy Holly.

Side A

1. "I'll Follow the Sun" – 1:46
2. "Baby's in Black" – 2:05

Side B

1. "Words of Love" – 2:04
2. "I Don't Want to Spoil the Party" – 2:34

== Personnel ==
- George Harrison – lead guitar, backing vocals on 'I Don't Want to Spoil the Party'
- John Lennon – vocals, rhythm guitar
- Paul McCartney – vocals, bass guitar
- Ringo Starr – drums, percussion

== See also ==
- Outline of the Beatles
- The Beatles timeline
