= The Boys (1962 British film) =

British courtroom drama by Sidney J. Furie

- Directed by: Sidney J. Furie
- Written by: Stuart Douglass
- Produced by: Sidney J. Furie
- Starring: Richard Todd; Robert Morley; Felix Aylmer
- Cinematography: Gerald Gibbs
- Edited by: Jack Slade
- Music by: The Shadows
- Production companies: Atlas Productions; Galaworldfilm Productions
- Distributed by: Gala Film Distributors (UK)
- Release date: September 1962 (UK)
- Running time: 123 minutes
- Country: United Kingdom
- Language: English

The Boys is a 1962 British courtroom drama film, directed by Sidney J. Furie and starring Richard Todd, Robert Morley and Felix Aylmer. The screenplay was by Stuart Douglass.

== Plot ==
Four young Teddy boys are on trial for the murder of a garage night watchman in the course of a burglary on the night of 15 January.

Much of the storyline revolves around the Three Aces, a pub opposite the Lantern Garage where the murder occurred. Witnesses and the accused give differing accounts of the lead-up to the crime during a dispiriting and frustrating evening out in London.

The first part of the film is structured as a series of vignettes relating to the evidence of each witness who saw the boys on the evening in question. Most of the witnesses concede that they judged the boys on the basis of their appearance. The boys admit to their defence counsel that they are hooligans and behave badly, but they deny murder.

Next there are insights into the boys' home lives. Stan's mother is very ill and the family are trying to get rehoused. Stan has a habit of constantly cleaning his fingernails with a flick-knife that is identical to the murder weapon. Barney is the most clean-cut of the group. Ginger has a job on a building site and has the most money, but he is the most reserved.

The prosecution spots a flaw in the boys' stories: Stan says that he bought a packet of cigarettes for his mother, at a time when he also said he did not even have the bus fare home. The truth is revealed: Stan instigated the robbery and was joined by Billy and Barney, but Ginger was unaware of any of this.

Ginger is acquitted; Billy and Barney, being under 18, are sentenced to be held indefinitely ("at Her Majesty's pleasure") while Stan, being 18, is sentenced to death.

== Cast ==
- Richard Todd as Victor Webster, prosecuting counsel
- Robert Morley as Montgomery, defence counsel
- Dudley Sutton as Stan Coulter
- Ronald Lacey as William (Billy) Herne
- Tony Garnett as Jim (Ginger) Thompson
- Jess Conrad as Barney Lee
- Felix Aylmer as The Judge
- Wilfrid Brambell as Robert Brewer (as Wilfred Bramble)
- Roy Kinnear as Mark Samuel (bus conductor)
- Allan Cuthbertson as Randolph St John (as Alan Cuthbertson)
- Colin Gordon as Gordon Lonsdale
- Wensley Pithey as Mr Coulter (as Wensley Athey)
- Kenneth J. Warren as George Tanner
- Patrick Magee as Mr Lee
- David Lodge as Mr Herne
- Mavis Villiers as Celia Barker
- Betty Marsden as Mrs Herne
- Laurence Hardy as Patmore
- Charles Morgan as Samuel Wallace
- Carol White as Evelyn May
- Patrick Newell as Crowhurst
- Rita Webb as Mrs Lee
- Tom Chatto as Morris
- Harold Scott as Caldwell
- George Moon as Mr Champneys
- Hilda Fenemore as Mrs Thompson (as Hilda Fennemore)
- Lloyd Lamble as Inspector Larner

=== Uncredited ===
- Olga Dickie as Mrs Coulter
- Ian Fleming as Court official
- Kevin Stoney as Police Inspector questioned at the trial
- Brian Weske as club announcer
- Ian Wilson

== Soundtrack ==
The Shadows composed four songs for the film that were released in 1962 as a 7" EP The Boys (Columbia SEG 8193).

== Reception ==
=== Box office ===
According to Kinematograph Weekly the film was considered a "money maker" at the British box office in 1962.

=== Critical reception ===
The Monthly Film Bulletin wrote: "Furie's direction, good as it is, cannot maintain interest for two hours in a script that is both repetitive and inadequately motivated, and he is too obsessed with courtroom detail to cut as often as he should. He is also hampered by the ill-advised casting of Richard Todd and Robert Morley (as counsels for the prosecution and defence). Todd is adequate; Morley plays shamelessly for laughs; neither is sufficiently self-effacing to avoid ruining the authentic anonymity that Furie might otherwise have achieved with his courtroom setting. As a film on the routine theme of teenagers, condemned before they are tried by society, this is, however, much above average."

The BBC calls the film an "innovative kitchen-sink drama charting the rise of teenage gang culture."

TV Guide states that, while there are "good performances all around, the effect is muddled by a complicated flashback structure".

According to website AllMovie, "The Boys benefits from Furie's dextrous use of flashbacks during the testimony scenes."

The Radio Times Guide to Films gave the film 2/5 stars, writing: "This badly dated courtroom drama from Sidney J Furie proves that some things never change. Jess Conrad, Dudley Sutton and their pals are suspected of murder simply because they're young and rebellious. The film becomes both patronising and predictable as canny lawyer Richard Todd champions the lads' cause, but the strong cast redeems the movie."

== Legacy ==
On 17 September 2017, the 55th anniversary of the film's release, the three surviving "boys", Conrad, Garnett and Sutton, met for a reunion showing of the film at Elstree Studios, where the courtroom scenes were filmed. It was explained at the Q&A section of the event that this was the first time any of the four had met since the film was made.
