= Grab Me a Gondola =

Grab Me a Gondola is a musical comedy in two acts with a book by Julian More, music by James Gilbert, and lyrics by James Gilbert and Julian More.

The original production moved from the Theatre Royal, Windsor, where it opened on 30 October 1956, to the Lyric Hammersmith and then to the Lyric Theatre in the West End, where it stayed for over 18 months, closing in July 1958.

The musical was inspired by photographs of British actress Diana Dors at the 1955 Venice Film Festival.
