= David Heneker =

British composer and lyricist (1906–2001)

- Born: David William Heneker; 31 March 1906; Southsea, Hampshire, England
- Died: 30 January 2001 (aged 94); Bridell, Ceredigion, Wales
- Occupation(s): Composer, lyricist
- Years active: 1934–1984
- Spouse(s): Ellen Hope (1929–34) (divorced); Gwenol Satow (1939–97) (her death)
- Family: Sir William Heneker (father)

David William Heneker (31 March 1906 – 30 January 2001) was a writer and composer of British popular music and musicals, best known for creating the music and lyrics for Half a Sixpence.

== Life and career ==
Heneker was born in Southsea, England, in March 1906, the eldest son of the Canadian-born Lieutenant Colonel William Heneker, a notable military strategist and tactician, who would later serve with distinction in World War I, rising to the rank of General.

Educated at Wellington and Sandhurst, Heneker followed his father into a military career. He served as a cavalry officer in the British Army from 1925 to 1937, and again in the War Office from 1939 to 1948, attaining the rank of Brigadier.

He became drawn to a second career in music after becoming familiar with the score of Noël Coward's Bitter Sweet while recuperating from a riding accident in 1934. His first published song was performed by Merle Oberon in the film The Broken Melody. Among his compositions was the Gracie Fields wartime hit "The Thing-Ummy Bob". After resigning his commission in 1948, he became a lounge singer at the Embassy Club, while continuing his songwriting.

In 1958, the writer Wolf Mankowitz invited Heneker to work with him and Monty Norman on the score of Expresso Bongo, and, from that point on, Heneker turned his talents to the musical theatre, producing a series of West End hit shows. The same year, he contributed the English lyrics to the 1956 Marguerite Monnot French musical Irma La Douce. The show transferred to Broadway two years later and was nominated for a Tony Award. After collaborating again with Norman on Make Me An Offer in 1959, Heneker saw his greatest West End triumphs with the full score to the Tommy Steele vehicle Half a Sixpence (1963) and a collaboration with John Taylor on Charlie Girl (1965). Half a Sixpence gave him his second Broadway success, this time earning two Tony Award nominations, for Best Musical and Best Original Score, while Charlie Girl enjoyed a five-year West End run. He was the first British writer to have two shows on Broadway which ran for more than 500 performances. Jorrocks (1966) and Popkiss (1972) were less successful, but he returned to form in his mid-seventies with The Biograph Girl in 1980, collaborating on this occasion with Warner Brown. His final musical, 1984's Peg, a musical version of the 1913 comedy Peg O' My Heart, was less successful.

== West End theatrical credits ==
- Expresso Bongo (1958) – composer, lyricist (with Monty Norman and Julian More)
- Irma La Douce (1958) – lyricist (with Monty Norman and Julian More)
- Make Me an Offer (1959) – composer, lyricist (jointly with Monty Norman)
- The Art of Living (1960) – composer, lyricist (jointly with Monty Norman)
- Half a Sixpence (1963) – composer, lyricist
- Charlie Girl (1965) – composer, lyricist (jointly with John Taylor)
- Jorrocks (1966) – composer, lyricist
- Phil the Fluter (1969) – composer, lyricist
- Popkiss (1972) – composer, lyricist
- The Biograph Girl (1980) – composer, lyricist (jointly with Warner Brown)
- Peg (1984) – composer, lyricist

== Work on Broadway ==
- Irma La Douce (1960) – Tony nomination for Best Musical 1961
- Half a Sixpence (1965) – Tony nominations for Best Musical and Best Original Score 1965

== Sources ==
- Who's Who in Musicals
- Obituary – The Independent
- Obituary – Daily Telegraph
