= Speak to me of love =

Speak to me of love may refer to:

== Film ==
- Parlami d'amore (2008 film; English: Speak to Me of Love), a 2008 Italo-Spanish film also released as "Speak to Me of Love"
- Speak to Me of Love (2002 film; French: Parlez-moi d'amour), a 2002 French drama film starring Sophie Marceau
- Speak to Me of Love (1975 film) (French: Parlez-moi d'amour), a 1975 French drama film
- The Ambassador's Daughter (1956 film), a 1956 U.S. romantic-comedy film, originally titled "Speak to Me of Love"
- Speak to Me of Love (1935 film) (French: Parlez-moi d'amour), a 1935 French comedy film

== Music ==
- "Parlez-moi d'amour" (song), a 1930 French song by Jean Lenoir, considered a French standard, the classic recording sung by Lucienne Boyer, sometimes translated as and released as "Speak to Me of Love"
- Speak to Me of Love (album), a 1963 album by Ray Conniff and the Ray Conniff Singers

== See also ==
- "Speak to Me of Love, Speak to Me of Truth" (song), a 1997 song by Billy Harper off the album If Our Hearts Could Only See
- Parlez-moi d'amour (disambiguation), translated as "speak to me of love"
- Let's Talk About Love (disambiguation)
