= The Biograph Girl =

Musical

- Sheet music for the title tune
- Music: David Heneker
- Lyrics: Warner Brown; David Heneker
- Book: Warner Brown
- Productions: 1980 West End

The Biograph Girl is a musical with a book by Warner Brown, lyrics by Brown and David Heneker, and music by Heneker. Its plot focuses on the silent film era and five pioneers of American cinema - actresses Mary Pickford and Lillian Gish, directors D. W. Griffith and Mack Sennett, and Paramount Pictures founder Adolph Zukor.

== Plot ==
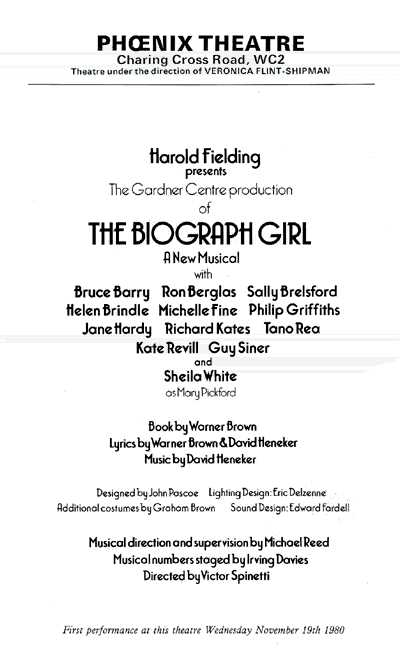
Programme from the 1980 West End production

When Mary Gish and her daughters Lillian and Dorothy recognize their friend Gladys Smith in a film made by the American Mutoscope and Biograph Company, they search for her at the studio headquarters in New York City. There they discover she has been rechristened Mary Pickford and is known as the Biograph Girl. Before long Lillian and Dorothy are acting in films directed by D.W. Griffith, and when he decides to relocate to Hollywood, he brings the girls and their mother with him.

Lillian is cast in The Birth of a Nation, while Mary decides to leave Griffith in order to work for Adolph Zukor at a substantially higher salary. Eventually she finds herself forced to suppress her growing sophistication in order to maintain the image of innocence her fans have embraced. Shocked by the negative public and industry reaction to The Birth of a Nation, Griffith vows to make an epic film advocating peace and tolerance.

Intolerance proves to be an artistic success but a commercial flop. Griffith's financial woes threaten to end his career until Mary joins him, Charles Chaplin, and Douglas Fairbanks to form United Artists. When Griffith's monetary situation fails to improve, he urges Lillian to accept an offer from another studio, and she reluctantly does.

With the arrival of sound films in 1927, the industry's pioneers are forced to re-evaluate their careers and make plans for the future.

== Production ==
Produced by Harold Fielding, directed by Victor Spinetti, and choreographed by Irving Davies, the musical premiered at the Phoenix Theatre in the West End on 19 November 1980 and closed after 57 performances. The cast included Sheila White as Mary Pickford, Bruce Barry as D.W. Griffith, Kate Revill as Lillian Gish, Guy Siner as Mack Sennett, and Ron Berglas as Adolph Zukor.

== Critical reception ==
Veteran theatre critic Harold Hobson found it to be "a most excellent, delicate and perceptive entertainment, with young players of talent so outstanding that after fifty years of play going I was taken by delighted surprise" and concluded, "I would ask all London to go and see it."

Francis King of the Sunday Telegraph said the score "is always tuneful, witty and sophisticated." In his review in the International Herald Tribune, Sheridan Morley described it as "a joyous celebration of the silent screen ... a delight. It captures moments of sheer exuberant nostalgia."

== Musical numbers ==
Act I

- "The Moving Picture Show" – Company
- "Working in Flickers" – Mary Pickford
- "That's What I Get All Day" – Wally and Company
- "The Moment I Close My Eyes" – D.W. Griffith
- "Diggin' Gold Dust" – Company
- "Every Lady Needs a Master" – Lillian Gish
- "I Just Wanted to Make Him Laugh" – Mack Sennett and Lillian Gish
- "I Like to Be the Way I Am in My Own Front Parlour" – Mary Pickford and Company
- "Beyond Babel" – D.W. Griffith and Company

Act II

- "A David Griffith Show" – Company
- "More Than a Man" – Lillian Gish
- "The Industry" – Adolph Zukor, Mary Pickford, Wally and Company
- "Gentle Fade" – D.W. Griffith
- "Nineteen Twenty-Five" – Company
- "The Biograph Girl" – Mary Pickford and Company
- "One of the Pioneers" – D.W. Griffith
- "Put It in the Tissue Paper" – Mack Sennett, Mary Pickford and Lillian Gish
- "Finale (Working in Flickers)" – Company
