= Irma La Douce (musical) =

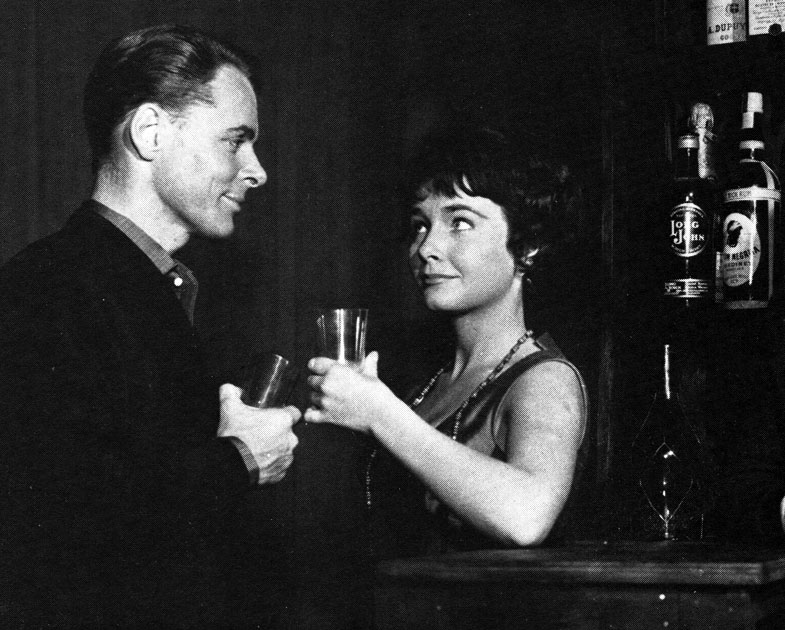
- 1959 production in Stockholm
- Music: Marguerite Monnot
- Lyrics: Alexandre Breffort
- Book: Alexandre Breffort
- Productions: 1956 Paris; 1958 West End; 1960 Broadway; 1962 Mexico City; 2014 City Center Encores!

Irma la douce ([iʁ.ma la dus], "Irma the Sweet") is a 1956 French musical with music by Marguerite Monnot and lyrics and book by Alexandre Breffort. The musical premiered in Paris in 1956, and was subsequently produced in the West End in 1958 and on Broadway, by David Merrick, in 1960. The English lyrics and book (1958) are by Julian More, David Heneker, and Monty Norman.

== Productions ==
The musical premiered at the Théâtre Gramont in Paris on 12 November 1956, where it ran for four years. It was produced in the West End at the Lyric Theatre, opening on 17 July 1958, running for 1,512 performances, for three years. The West End production was directed by Peter Brook with choreography by John Heawood, and starred Keith Michell as Nestor, a student, Elizabeth Seal as Irma, and Clive Revill as the barman/narrator.

Irma La Douce opened on Broadway at the Plymouth Theatre (later the Gerald Schoenfeld Theatre) on 29 September 1960, moved to the Alvin Theatre on 30 October 1961, and closed on 31 December 1961, after 524 performances. The production was directed by Peter Brook with choreography by Onna White. Repeating their roles from the London production were Michell, Seal, and Revill. Stuart Damon and Fred Gwynne also were featured.

The story was adapted for a non-musical film of the same title in 1963, directed by Billy Wilder starring Jack Lemmon and Shirley MacLaine.

== Plot ==
Irma La Douce is a successful prostitute in Paris. A poor law student, Nestor le Fripé, falls in love with her and is jealous of her clients. In order to keep her for himself, he assumes the disguise of a rich older man, "Oscar", and takes many jobs. Finally no longer able to sustain his exhausting life, he "kills" Oscar, is convicted of murder, and is transported to the Devil's Island penal colony. He escapes and returns to Paris, and proves that he is innocent. He and Irma reunite.

== Songs (English version) ==
Act I

- "Valse Milieu"—Bob-Le-Hotu
- "Sons of France"—The Mecs, Polyte-Le-Mou and Police Inspector
- "The Bridge of Caulaincourt"—Irma-La-Douce and Nestor-Le-Fripe
- "Our Language of Love"—Irma-La-Douce and Nestor-Le-Fripe
- "She's Got The Lot"—Police Inspector and Irma's Admirers
- "Our Language of Love (Reprise)"—Irma-La-Douce
- "Dis-Donc"—Irma-La-Douce
- "Le Grisbi is le Root of le Evil in Man"—Bob-Le-Hotu, Nestor-Le-Fripe and the Mecs
- "Wreck of a Mec"—Nestor-Le-Fripe
- "That's a Crime"—Bob-Le-Hotu, Nestor-Le-Fripe and the Mecs

Act II

- "The Bridge of Caulaincourt (Reprise)"—Irma-La-Douce and Nestor-Le-Fripe
- "From a Prison Cell"—Nestor-Le-Fripe and the Mecs
- "Irma-la-Douce"—Irma-La-Douce
- "There Is Only One Paris for That"—Nestor-Le-Fripe, the Mecs and Prisoners
- "The Freedom of the Seas"—Nestor-Le-Fripe and the Mecs
- "There Is Only One Paris for That (Reprise)"—Nestor-Le-Fripe and the Mecs
- "Our Language of Love (Reprise)"—Irma-La-Douce
- "But"—Nestor-Le-Fripe, Police Inspector, A Tax Inspector, M. Bougne and Polyte-Le-Mou
- "Christmas Child"—The Company

== Response ==
Life Magazine called the musical "a French fairy tale for wicked grown-ups who want to believe in love" and praised Seal. "Elizabeth Seal is an ideal Irma, tender, breezy, and totally implausible as a bad girl...the season's new favorite." "Another asset is Clive Revill...who provides the right clowning touch."

== Awards and nominations ==
=== Original Broadway production ===
Year	Award	Category	Nominee	Result
1961	Tony Award	Best Musical		Nominated
1961	Tony Award	Best Performance by a Leading Actress in a Musical	Elizabeth Seal	Won
1961	Tony Award	Best Performance by a Featured Actor in a Musical	Clive Revill	Nominated
1961	Tony Award	Best Direction of a Musical	Peter Brook	Nominated
1961	Tony Award	Best Choreography	John Heawood	Nominated
1961	Tony Award	Best Conductor and Musical Director	Stanley Lebowsky	Nominated
1961	Tony Award	Best Costume Design	Rolf Gerard	Nominated
