= Hits (The Beach Boys EP) =

EP by the Beach Boys
- Released: May 1966
- Recorded: February 24 – October 24, 1965
- Studios: Western and Columbia, Hollywood
- Length: 10:14
- Label: Capitol

The Beach Boys EPs chronology
| Four by the Beach Boys (1964) | Hits (1966) | God Only Knows (1966) |

Hits is an EP by the American rock band the Beach Boys, released in May 1966 and containing four of the band's most recent hit singles up to that point. Hits was the UK number-one EP for 34 weeks, having eight separate stints at the top of the chart from June 1966 until December 1967 – this is the highest number of weeks as number-one EP. Hits was the incumbent number one when the chart ceased on 16 December 1967.

== Background ==
Each of the four songs on the EP had been released as singles. In America all charted on the Billboard Hot 100: "Help Me, Rhonda" had reached number one on 29 May 1965, "California Girls" had peaked at number three on 28 August 1965, "The Little Girl I Once Knew" peaked at number twenty on 1 January 1966, and "Barbara Ann" peaked at number two on 29 January 1966. Three of the singles had also been previously released in the UK, with "Help Me, Rhonda" and "California Girls" making the top thirty of the Record Retailer chart and "Barbara Ann" peaking at number three in March 1966.

== Chart performance ==
Beginning in 1960s, in addition to publishing a long play (LP) chart, Record Retailer also ran an EP chart. Hits was released in May 1966 and became a number-one EP on 4 June. It stayed at the top for four weeks and was then displaced by the Walker Brothers' EP I Need You. Hits returned to the top again on 10 September for another four weeks, being displaced again by the same Walker Brothers EP. On 29 October it returned for a third stint at number-one of seven weeks. The Who took the number-one spot over Christmas and in the New Year of 1967, with Hits reclaiming number-one on 21 January for another seven weeks. After five months of the top, Hits returned on 12 August for another six weeks at the top in its fifth stint at number-one. The EP alternated weeks at number-one with the Four Tops Hits EP in late September and early October and at this point EPs were dying out. Hits returned for its eighth and final period atop the chart on 25 November and remained there for four weeks; it was the incumbent number one when the chart ceased on 16 December 1967. In total, Hits amassed 34 weeks at the top of the chart – more than any other EP.

== Track listing ==
Side one

1. "Help Me, Rhonda" (Brian Wilson/Mike Love) – 2:46
2. "California Girls" (B. Wilson/Love) – 2:45

Side two

1. "The Little Girl I Once Knew" (B. Wilson) – 2:35
2. "Barbara Ann" (Fred Fassert) – 2:08

== Charts ==
Weekly chart performance
| Chart (1966–67) | Peak position |
|---|---|
| U.K. (Record Retailer) | 1 |

== Sources ==
- Badman, Keith (2004). The Beach Boys: The Definitive Diary of America's Greatest Band, on Stage and in the Studio. San Francisco, California: Backbeat Books. ISBN 978-0-87930-818-6 – via the Internet Archive.
- Warwick, Neil; Kutner, Jon; Brown, Tony (2004). The Complete Book Of The British Charts: Singles and Albums (3rd ed.). London: Omnibus Press. ISBN 1-84449-058-0.
- Elliott, Brad (2003). Surf's Up! The Beach Boys on Record, 1961–1981. Surf's Up Books. ISBN 0-9727686-1-0.
