= Cliff's Silver Discs =

1960 EP by Cliff Richard and the Shadows

EP by Cliff Richard and the Shadows
- Released: 2 December 1960
- Recorded: July 1959, November 1959 & March 1960
- Studios: EMI Studios, London
- Genres: Pop; rock
- Length: 10:07
- Label: Columbia
- Producer: Norrie Paramor

Cliff Richard and the Shadows chronology
Cliff Sings No. 4 (1960)	Cliff's Silver Discs (1960)	Me & My Shadows (No. 1) (1961)

Cliff's Silver Discs is a compilation EP by Cliff Richard and the Shadows, released in December 1960. It topped both the Record Retailer and Melody Maker EP charts.

== Release and reception ==
Released at the beginning of December 1960, Cliff's Silver Discs contains four out of the six silver discs awarded to Richard and the Shadows up until then by Disc magazine for 250,000 sales. The first three tracks had been released as singles earlier in 1960, with the final track, "Travellin' Light", released the previous year. "Travellin' Light" was recorded in July 1959 and released in October 1959; then "Fall in Love with You", recorded in November 1959, was released in March 1960; then "Please Don't Tease", recorded in March and then released in June 1960; and then finally "Nine Times Out of Ten", also recorded in March, was released in September 1960. The two releases awarded silver discs not included on this EP are "Living Doll" and "A Voice in the Wilderness".

Reviewing for Disc, Keith Graham gave the EP five out of five stars, awarding it "EP Of The Month".

Upon entering the Record Retailer EP chart a week after its release, Cliff's Silver Discs topped the chart two weeks later, before falling three places the following week and rising back to the top the week after that. It spent 52 consecutive weeks on the chart, leaving the chart after the first week of December 1961. It re-entered the chart in the final week of January 1962 and stayed on the chart for another four weeks, making a total of 57 weeks on the chart. The EP performed even better on the Melody Maker EP chart, topping it for six weeks.

== Track listing ==
Side A
No.	Title	Writer(s)	Length
1.	"Please Don't Tease"	Bruce Welch; Pete Chester	2:59
2.	"Fall in Love with You"	Ian Samwell	2:30

Side B
No.	Title	Writer(s)	Length
3.	"Nine Times Out of Ten"	Waldense Hall; Otis Blackwell	2:07
4.	"Travellin' Light"	Sid Tepper; Roy C. Bennett	2:31
Total length:			10:07

== Personnel ==
- Cliff Richard – vocals
- Hank Marvin – lead guitar, backing vocals (2)
- Bruce Welch – rhythm guitar, backing vocals (2)
- Jet Harris – bass guitar
- Tony Meehan – drums

== Charts ==
Chart (1960)	Peak position
UK Record Retailer Top 20	1
UK Melody Maker Top 10	1
