= Frank Ifield's Hits =

EP by Frank Ifield
- Released: 1963
- Genre: Pop
- Label: EMI Columbia (SEG 8210)
- Producer: Norrie Paramor

Frank Ifield's Hits is an EP by singer Frank Ifield. It was released in 1963 and spent a total of 13 weeks at number one in the UK EPs Chart in four separate runs.

The EP collected the A and B sides of Ifield's hit singles "I Remember You" and "Lovesick Blues". It was released in mono only.

== Track listing ==
Side A

1. "I Remember You"
2. "I Listen to My Heart"

Side B

3. "Lovesick Blues"
4. "She Taught Me How to Yodel"
