= Bunny Lewis =

English record producer, composer and music manager (1918–2001)

- Also known as: Lee Lange, Johnny May, Emile Reisdorff
- Born: Bridges George McGibbon Lewis; 12 November 1918; Kensington, London, England
- Died: 7 September 2001 (aged 82) Westminster, London, England
- Genres: Traditional popular music
- Occupations: Composer; record producer; songwriter; music manager
- Years active: Late 1940s – late 1960s
- Label: Decca
- Formerly of: David Whitfield; Mantovani; Helen Shapiro; Craig Douglas; Eden Kane

Bridges Georges McGibbon Lewis (12 November 1918 – 7 September 2001) professionally known under pen name Bunny Lewis, also known professionally under various pseudonyms was a London-based manager, record producer and composer and music manager whose songwriting abilities were used in a number of films. Sometimes this coincided with involvement in films of musicians whom he personally managed, most notably the actor and singer, Craig Douglas. He also co-composed the 1954 song "Cara Mia", which was a bestseller. Authorship was accredited to 'Tulio Trapani and Lee Lange'; Lee Lange was the pseudonym for David Whitfield's producer, Lewis, and Tulio Trapani was the pen name of the song's other co-writer and arranger, Mantovani.

== Biography ==
Lewis was born in November 1918 in Kensington, London, England. he served in World War II in the Black Watch and was awarded the Military Cross.

After being demobbed in January 1946, Lewis worked at Decca Records. His major work was connected to three late 1950s and early 1960s productions; Expresso Bongo (1959), The Frightened City (1961), and also It's Trad, Dad! (1961), which co-starred Douglas.

=== Film credits ===
Other film credits included work on A Change of Heart (1962), The Painted Smile (1962) and One Too Many (1950).

=== Management ===
Lewis managed Doug Sheldon, Tony King, Bourbon Street, Christine Quaite and Douglas, giving the singer previously known as Terry Perkins, the name under which he would become famous. Sheldon was discovered by Lewis while acting on stage, and was offered a recording contract with Decca.

As a composer, Lewis contributed the song "A Voice in the Wilderness", to the Cliff Richard film, Expresso Bongo. Lewis also wrote a handful of songs that figured in the repertoire of early 1960s UK pop star Helen Shapiro; specifically "Kiss 'n' Run", "Let's Talk About Love", "Little Miss Lonely", and "Marvellous Lie". Craig Douglas' cover version of "Oh Lonesome Me" (1962) was produced by Lewis. As well as Lee Lange, Bridges also wrote and produced his songs under the pseudonyms of Johnny May and Emile Reisdorff.

=== Composer ===
Lewis' record production tally extended to David Whitfield's "Cara Mia" and "Answer Me"; Eden Kane's "Well I Ask You"; plus Craig Douglas' version of "Only Sixteen". All of these songs were number one hits in the UK Singles Chart. Lewis' UK chart-topping effort of four production credits exceeds notables such as Phil Spector, Mickie Most, Denny Cordell, Phil Coulter and Albhy Galuten, all of whom managed only three such achievements.

=== Awards ===
In 1999, Lewis was presented with a Gold Badge award by the British Academy of Songwriters, Composers and Authors (BASCA).

== Death ==
Lewis died in Westminster, London, in September 2001, at the age of 82.
