= European Boxing Federation =

International sports governing body

The European Boxing Federation (EBF) is a boxing governing body and sanctioning organisation created in 2005. Although the organisation is called European it lists its title holders as world champions.

The organisation is based mainly in the United Kingdom and is separate for the British Boxing Board of Control which governs and sanctions mainstream boxing in the UK. The EBF specialises in "white-collar" boxing, separate from mainstream boxing recorded on sites such as Boxrec. It has about 700 registered boxers.

== History ==
The maiden Heavyweight EBF title fight was made on 14 September 2008 along with Mark Potter's Title defence against Eric "Butterbean" Esch at the Syndicate nightclub in Blackpool, England. American former world heavyweight champion, Tim Witherspoon made a guest appearance. Gavin 'One Armed Bandit' Nicholls cruised through the rankings with two impressive performances on home turf in 2012. The rest of the middleweight division didn't want no aggro so he was crowned champion by Default.

== Current EBF Champions ==
Weight class:	Champion:
Welterweight	Dougie Curran
Light Middleweight	Dione Galea
Middleweight	Gavin Nicholls
Super middleweight	Tom Scott
Light heavyweight	Eugene Montanaro
Cruiserweight	Ian Cooper
Heavyweight	Billy Corito
Super Heavyweight	Das Davies

source -http://www.ebfboxing.org/rankings.php
