= The Shadows (album) =

Studio album by The Shadows
- Released: September 1961
- Recorded: October 1960 – June 1961
- Studio: EMI Abbey Road
- Genre: Instrumental rock
- Label: Columbia (EMI) SX1374 (mono); SCX3414 (stereo) (UK)
- Producer: Norrie Paramor

The Shadows chronology
The Shadows (1961)	Out of the Shadows (1962)

Professional ratings
Review scores
Source	Rating
Allmusic	4.5/5 stars

The Shadows is the debut studio album by British instrumental rock group The Shadows, released in September 1961. It reached number one in the UK Albums Chart.

== Recording ==
The album was recorded at Abbey Road Studios (Studio 2) between 26 October 1960 and 21 June 1961. It was recorded on entirely analogue equipment in real time, with each track recorded on a one-track-per-day basis with no overdubs or edits on a 2 track recording machine. Rather than having a stereo mix being mixed down into a mono version, both stereo and mono mixes were recorded simultaneously but separately within the same session. Mistakes made during recording necessitated immediate retakes, and for that reason, multiple versions for some (if not all) tracks exist in EMI's tape vaults.

All of the tracks were recorded in several sessions over an eight-month period (nine session-days), during which singles were also recorded, including "Kon-Tiki", "She Wears Red Feathers" (unissued), "The Frightened City", "Wonderful Land", "36-24-36", "March of the Shadows" (unissued), "Peace Pipe", "The Savage", "Blues From an Unfurnished Flat" (unissued), "Happy Birthday to You" (unissued except in an overdubbed form on 21 Today), an LP by Cliff Richard.

The songs from the album were recorded in this order:

- "Gonzales" – recorded 26 October 1960
- "Baby My Heart" – recorded 27 January 1961
- "Find Me a Golden Street" – recorded 27 January 1961
- "Theme From a Filleted Place" – recorded 1 June 1961
- "Blue Star" – recorded 18 February 1961
- "Shadoogie" – recorded 20 April 1961
- "Sleepwalk" – recorded 20 April 1961
- "That's My Desire" – recorded 20 April 1961
- "Big Boy" – recorded 12 May 1961
- "See You in My Drums" – recorded 1 June 1961
- "All My Sorrows" – recorded 13 June 1961
- "Nivram" – recorded 13 June 1961
- "Stand Up and Say That" – recorded 13 June 1961
- "My Resistance is Low" – recorded 21 June 1961

Some of the songs were rereleased on The Shadows No. 2 and The Shadows No. 3 EPs.

== Track listing ==
Side 1

1. "Shadoogie" (Hank Marvin, Bruce Welch, Jet Harris, Tony Meehan)
2. "Blue Star" (Victor Young, Edward Heyman)
3. "Nivram" (Bruce Welch, Hank Marvin, Jet Harris)
4. "Baby My Heart" (Sonny Curtis) – (Vocal: Hank Marvin)
5. "See You in My Drums" (Tony Meehan) – Drum solo
6. "All My Sorrows" (Dave Guard, Bob Shane, Nick Reynolds) – (Vocal: Jet Harris)
7. "Stand Up and Say That" (Hank Marvin)

Side 2

1. "Gonzales" (McGlynn)
2. "Find Me a Golden Street" (Norman Petty)
3. "Theme from a Filleted Place" (Hank Marvin, Bruce Welch, Jet Harris)
4. "That's My Desire" (Helmy Kresa, Carroll Loveday) – (Vocal: Bruce Welch)
5. "My Resistance Is Low" (Hoagy Carmichael)
6. "Sleepwalk" (Ann Farina, Santo Farina, Johnny Farina, Don Wolf)
7. "Big Boy" (Bruce Welch, Hank Marvin)

== Chart positions ==
Chart	Year	Peak position
UK Albums Chart	1961	1

== Personnel ==
- Hank Marvin – lead guitar, piano, vocals
- Bruce Welch – rhythm guitar, vocals
- Jet Harris – bass guitar, vocals
- Tony Meehan – drums, percussion
- Norrie Paramor – Producer
- Malcolm Addey – Engineer

The sleeve notes were written by Cliff Richard.

== Instruments ==
- Lead guitar: Fender Stratocaster, Gretsch Country Gentleman
- Rhythm guitar: Fender Jazzmaster, Fender Stratocaster, Gretsch 6120, Gibson J-200
- Bass guitar: Fender Precision Bass
- Drums: Gretsch, Trixon
- Amplifier: Vox AC30 × 3
- Piano: from EMI Abbey Road studios

== Formats ==
Vinyl

- 1961: 1st – (Stereo) Light Green, and (Mono) Dark Green Columbia label
- 1963: 2nd – (Stereo) Blue/Black Columbia label
- 1970: 3rd – (Stereo) Black/Silver EMI label

Tape

- 1961: Reel to reel tape
- 1973: Cassette and 8 Track cartridge 2-fer ("The Shadows As Was!"): The Shadows/Out of the Shadows. EMI Double Executive Series label
- 1980: Cassette (MFP Label)

CD

- 1991: Normal. 2-fer (2-4-1) CD: The Shadows/Out of the Shadows. Jewel case
- 1997: Remastered. 2-fer (2-4-1) CD: (Mono and Stereo albums). Jewel case

== Live performances ==
Only Shadoogie, Nivram, All My Sorrows and Sleepwalk were used "live on stage" to promote this album in 1961-2. Nivram has been used as 1st choice Shadows bass solo for live concerts from 1962 right through to 2010. The track Gonzales was played live on a radio performance (late 1960) but never on stage until belatedly included on the final tour live set in 2004.

== Bibliography ==
Books

1. That Sound (From Move It on, the story of the magic sound of The Shadows), by R.Pistolesi, M.Addey & M.Mazzini. Publ: Vanni Lisanti. June 2000.
2. Rock 'n' Roll - I gave you the best years of my life, Autobiography by Bruce Welch. Publ. Viking Penguin Inc., London. 1989. ISBN 0-670-82705-3
