= Expresso Bongo (film) =

1959 British film by Val Guest

- Directed by: Val Guest
- Written by: Wolf Mankowitz; Julian More (play)
- Produced by: Jon Penington
- Starring: Laurence Harvey; Cliff Richard; Sylvia Syms; Yolande Donlan; Eric Pohlmann; Hermione Baddeley; Gilbert Harding
- Cinematography: John Wilcox
- Edited by: Bill Lenny
- Music by: Robert Farnon
- Production company: Val Guest Productions
- Distributed by: British Lion Films
- Release date: 11 December 1959
- Running time: 111 minutes
- Country: United Kingdom
- Language: English
- Budget: £156,082

Expresso Bongo is a 1959 British drama musical film directed by Val Guest, shot in uncredited black & white Dyaliscope and starring Laurence Harvey, Cliff Richard, and Yolande Donlan. It was written by Wolf Mankowitz adapted from the stage musical of the same name by Julian More, which was first produced at the Saville Theatre, London, on 23 April 1958.

== Plot ==
Sleazy hustler Johnny Jackson is always on the lookout for fresh talent to exploit, while managing his hectic life with his stripper girlfriend, Maisie King. Maisie is looking to find a better life in singing.

Jackson discovers a teenage singer named Bert Rudge in an espresso coffee shop and sets about sending him along the rocky road to fame. He changes his name to Bongo Herbert and soon gets him a record deal and a relationship with an ageing American singing sensation Dixie Collins.

Johnny gets a meeting with Mr Mayer of Garrick Records and gets Maisie to phone him there pretending to be representative from the HMV record label, this prompts Mr Mayer into giving Bongo a contract.

However, Bongo soon realises that his 50/50 contract, which he naively agreed with Johnny, is not as great as he thought it was, and breaks from Johnny's contract with help from Dixie Collins, because Bongo is still legally a minor.

== Cast ==
- Laurence Harvey as Johnny Jackson
- Sylvia Syms as Maisie King
- Yolande Donlan as Dixie Collins
- Cliff Richard as Bert Rudge / Bongo Herbert
- Meier Tzelniker as Mayer
- Ambrosine Phillpotts as Lady Rosemary
- Eric Pohlmann as Leon (credited as Eric Pohlman)
- Gilbert Harding as Himself
- Hermione Baddeley as Penelope
- Reginald Beckwith as Reverend Tobias Craven
- The Shadows as Themselves (credited as Bongo's Backing Band)

== Production ==
The film was made at Shepperton Studios, near London. Some scenes were filmed on location, in London's Soho district. The University of London website for December, 2015, states that 32, Hanway Street, London, was also used for some of the film's scenes. Formerly 'Dicken's Chop House', about 1955 it had become 'The 'Chiquito Club' and espresso coffee bar. Its first proprietor, K. D. Emihea, (later imprisoned for contempt of court), held a license in 1957 for two guitar players, but not for dancing. The basement was a skiffle singing room.

Director Val Guest engaged Kenneth MacMillan to choreograph the strip-club dancers who appear in the film. Struggling to get them to dance and sing to playback at the same time, MacMillan complained, "It's the simplest routine. They may have looks, legs and tits, but they have no co-ordination."

At first, Laurence Harvey was undecided on the kind of accent he would give his character, so Guest told him he was "part Soho, part Jewish, and part middle-class" and that it might be an idea to model him on the writer Wolf Mankowitz. Harvey arranged a couple of lunches with the unsuspecting Mankowitz to study the writer at close hand, so the character Johnny Jackson in the film sounds something like the writer of the film.

Harvey's character sports a melange of accents including his own South African. Wolf Mankowitz appears in the film's opening credit sequence, wearing a sandwich-board bearing his writer credit.

This was the second screen appearance for Cliff Richard and the Shadows in 1959, the first being Serious Charge.

== Soundtrack album ==
The music soundtrack for the 1959 film was produced by Norrie Paramor. With the exception of one song, it was entirely different from the music that was used in the 1958 stage musical. The music and the plot were rewritten to downplay the satire and showcase Richard and his band. Only "The Shrine on the Second Floor" — a song that was intended to drive a sharpened stake into the heart of all sentimental ballads about mother – made it into the movie, but Richard sang it straight.

Track No.	Title	Composer(s)	Lyricist(s)	Performance
1	"Nausea"	David Henneker and Monty Norman	Julian More and Wolf Mankowitz	From original stage show
2	"The Shrine on the Second Floor"	David Henneker and Monty Norman	Julian More and Wolf Mankowitz	Cliff Richard
3	"I've Never Had It So Good"	David Henneker and Monty Norman	Julian More and Wolf Mankowitz	From original stage show
4	"A Voice in the Wilderness"	Norrie Paramor	Bunny Lewis	Cliff Richard
5	"Loch Lomond"	Uncredited (Traditional)	Uncredited (Traditional)	Arranged by Robert Farnon / Performed by the chorus girls
6	"You Can Look at the Goods but Don't Touch"	Robert Farnon	Val Guest	Sylvia Syms and the chorus girls
7	"Bongo Blues" (Instrumental)	Norrie Paramor	N/A	Performed by Hank B. Marvin, Bruce Welch, Jet Harris, Tony Meehan and Cliff Richard
8	"The Irish Washerwoman"	Traditional	Traditional	Arranged by Robert Farnon
9	"Love"	Norrie Paramor	Bunny Lewis	Cliff Richard
10	"Worry Go Lucky Me"	Robert Farnon	Val Guest	
11	"Nothing Is For Nothing"	David Henneker and Monty Norman	Julian More and Wolf Mankowitz	
12	"You Can't Fool You"	Robert Farnon	Paddy Roberts	

== Reception ==
=== Box office ===
According to Val Guest the film made "a lot of money and got us a lot of awards". Kine Weekly called it a "money maker" at the British box office in 1960.

=== Critical reception ===
The Monthly Film Bulletin wrote:

It is loud, brash and vulgar. Its vitality is its most endearing quality, but even this cannot hide a split in the film's personality. In broadening the humour of his original play and watering down some of its more savage satire, presumably in the hope of appealing to a mass audience, Wolf Mankowitz has fallen between two stools. The satire is still sharp enough to alienate a "pop" audience, but the sentiment will blunt its edge for the sophisticated. Val Guest's direction has blurred the issue even further. Several small part players are encouraged to overplay in a style more suited to farce, and the first musical number is delayed so long that even the genre is in doubt for nearly half the film. Nevertheless the numbers from the original show, "Nausea" and "The Shrine on the Second Floor", have real bite, and the background and atmosphere of the Soho jungle are brilliantly sketched. Laurence Harvey's playing of Johnny emphasises the difficulty of establishing a coherent mood. The part allows him a number of chances to soften the character and he seizes them so well that he retains a degree of audience sympathy throughout. Dixie and Bongo are drawn with a similar equivocality, and Bongo, in the person of Cliff Richard, is played absolutely straight. However, most of the principals perform with wit and verve, especially Meier Tzelniker in his original part of the director of a disc company.

Rating the film 4/5 stars in a review for Radio Times, David Parkinson wrote: "This isn't only a fascinating snapshot of Soho in the skiffle and coffee bar era, but it's also one of the best musicals ever produced in this country. Oozing the easy charm and shiftless opportunism that had just served him so well in Room at the Top, Laurence Harvey is perfectly cast as the talent agent hoping to get rich quick through rookie rocker Cliff Richard, who, for all his raw appeal, is also very religious. Val Guest captures the fads and fashions of the late 1950s, but it's Wolf Mankowitz's crackling script that gives the film its authenticity."

Filmink magazine called it "a most likeable film (if you can handle Harvey’s accent)."
