= Strictly Elvis =

EP by Elvis Presley
- Released: January 25, 1957 (US); December 1959 (UK)
- Genres: Rock and roll, rockabilly
- Label: RCA

Strictly Elvis is an extended play (EP) by American singer and musician Elvis Presley released in January 1957 and December 1959. It peaked at number one in the number-one EPs chart in the United Kingdom and was five weeks in the number-one, until it was superseded by Expresso Bongo, which became number-one on April 23, 1960.

An EP, also called "Strictly Elvis", had been issued in the US in January 1957. This contained a completely different set of tracks; it was not issued in the UK until 1964, when it came out under the title "Elvis For You, Volume 2". The UK "Strictly Elvis" EP had no direct US equivalent.

All songs on the US Tracklist were previously released on the 1956 album Elvis

== US Track listing (1957) ==
1. "Long Tall Sally"
2. "First in Line"
3. "How Do You Think I Feel"
4. "How's the World Treating You"

== UK Track listing (1959) ==
1. "Old Shep" (Red Foley, Arthur Willis)
2. "Any Place Is Paradise" (Joe "Cornbread" Thomas)
3. "Paralyzed" (Otis Blackwell, Elvis Presley)
4. "Is It So Strange" (Faron Young)

== Personnel ==
- Elvis Presley – vocals, acoustic guitar, piano on "Old Shep" and "Paralyzed".
- Scotty Moore – electric guitar
- Gordon Stoker – piano on "Any Place Is Paradise"
- Dudley Brooks – piano on "Is It So Strange"
- Bill Black – double bass
- D.J. Fontana – drums
- The Jordanaires – back-up vocals
