= Nowhere Man (EP) =

EP by the Beatles
- Released: 8 July 1966
- Recorded: 13 October – 11 November 1965
- Studio: EMI, London
- Genre: Rock, folk rock
- Length: 11:11
- Label: Parlophone
- Producer: George Martin

The Beatles EP chronology
Yesterday (1966)	Nowhere Man (1966)	Magical Mystery Tour (1967)

Professional ratings
Review scores
Source	Rating
AllMusic	4/5 stars

Nowhere Man is the 12th extended play (EP) by the English rock band the Beatles. It was released on 8 July 1966. It includes four songs from their album Rubber Soul, which had been released in December 1965. The EP was only issued in mono, with the Parlophone catalogue number GEP 8952.

In the UK, Nowhere Man peaked at number 4 on the national EP chart compiled by Record Retailer. In the United States, the title track and "Drive My Car" had been omitted from Capitol Records' version of Rubber Soul and were instead included on the US and Canada album Yesterday and Today. "Nowhere Man" was also issued as a single in the US in February 1966. Another track from the EP, "Michelle", similarly became a hit in some European countries and in New Zealand.

Reviewing Nowhere Man in their book The Beatles: An Illustrated Record, music critics Roy Carr and Tony Tyler wrote: "The issue of this EP reflects a cute tactic of the mid-'sixties record companies: find out which were the most popular tracks from the artists' last LP – and presto! Another Extended-Player. An accountants' move." In his review for AllMusic, Bruce Eder says:

It only got better than this if one bought the album ... The packaging and art were still cool, but the group's songs and albums were now so substantial (and the latter also selling so well) that the EP was reduced to irrelevancy. Additionally, the Beatles were soon going to start releasing records that were a lot harder to pair together and were also going to take a lot more control over how their work was packaged and delivered.

The album cover is a photograph of the band taken by Bob Whitaker, depicting them under a cedar tree in the grounds of Chiswick House in West London. The tree also featured in the films for their single "Paperback Writer" and its B side, "Rain".

== Track listing ==
All songs written by Lennon–McCartney.

Side one

1. "Nowhere Man" – 2:44
2. "Drive My Car" – 2:25

Side two

3. "Michelle" – 2:40
4. "You Won't See Me" – 3:22

== See also ==
- Outline of the Beatles
- The Beatles timeline
