= Fall in Love with You =

1960 single by Cliff Richard and the Shadows

Single by Cliff Richard and the Shadows
- B-side: "Willie and the Hand Jive"
- Released: 18 March 1960
- Recorded: 19 November 1959
- Studio: EMI Studios, London
- Genre: Pop
- Length: 2:30
- Label: Columbia
- Songwriter(s): Ian Samwell
- Producer(s): Norrie Paramor

Cliff Richard and the Shadows singles chronology
"A Voice in the Wilderness" (1960)	"Fall in Love with You" (1960)	"Please Don't Tease" (1960)

"Fall in Love with You" is a song by Cliff Richard and the Shadows, released as a single in March 1960. It peaked at number 2 on the UK Singles Chart and also received a silver disc for 250,000 sales.

== Release ==
"Fall in Love with You" was released with the flip side "Willie and the Hand Jive", a 1958 song by Johnny Otis, due to public demand, as Richard had been playing it on stage. Richard recalled that he thought "Willie and the Hand Jive" "was so good that we recorded it and released it on the back of Fall In Love With You which we thought was the better single. But the public thought otherwise, you see. And they were asking for the B-side as many times as they were asking for Fall In Love With You".

Although no longer deemed as the canonical official UK Singles Chart from March 1960, on the NME chart "Willie and the Hand Jive" peaked at number 18, with ”Fall in Love with You" peaking at number 2.

In December 1960, Richard recorded a German-language version of "Fall in Love with You", titled "Bin verliebt", with German lyrics by Lambert Fleming. It was released as a single only in Germany in January 1961. The song has a completely different backing track compared to the original version, and the band is credited as 'Berlipp's Band' (with 'die Hansen-Boys' as backing singers), so it's unlikely the Shadows played on it. The B-side is a German-language version of "A Voice in the Wilderness", titled "Die Stimme der Liebe", with German lyrics by Jean Nicolas, which also has a completely different backing track.

== Track listing ==
7": Columbia / DB 4431

1. "Fall in Love with You" – 2:30
2. "Willie and the Hand Jive" – 2:37

7": Columbia / C 21 703 (Germany, 1961)

1. "Bin verliebt" – 2:29
2. "Die Stimme der Liebe" – 2:15

== Personnel ==
- Cliff Richard – vocals
- Hank Marvin – lead guitar, backing vocals
- Bruce Welch – rhythm guitar, backing vocals
- Jet Harris – bass guitar
- Tony Meehan – drums

== Charts ==
Chart (1960)	Peak position
India (The Voice, Calcutta)	6
Ireland (Evening Herald)	2
Netherlands (Single Top 100)	12
Norway (VG-lista)	6
Sweden (Sverigetopplistan)	14
UK Singles (OCC)	2

"Bin verliebt"

Chart (1961)	Peak position
Germany (GfK)	40

== Cover versions ==
- In 1960, Ray Pilgrim, under the pseudonym Bobby Stevens, released a cover of the song as his debut single.
- In 1961, New Zealand duo Bill and Boyd released a cover of the song as a single.
