= Holiday Carnival =

1963 EP by Cliff Richard

EP by Cliff Richard
- Released: May 1963
- Recorded: April – December 1962
- Studios: EMI Studios, London
- Genre: Pop
- Label: Columbia
- Producer: Norrie Paramor

Cliff Richard chronology
Time for Cliff & the Shadows (1963)	Holiday Carnival (1963)	Hits from Summer Holiday (1963)

Holiday Carnival is an EP written by Cliff Richard, released in May 1963. It topped the Record Retailer EP chart on three occasions in June and July 1963.

== Background and release ==
Cliff Richard and the Shadows were chosen to open The ABC Theatre in Blackpool after it was rebuilt and renamed from the old Hippodrome Theatre with a summer season stage show. The production, named Holiday Carnival, also featured other acts such as actress Carole Gray, ventriloquist Arthur Worsley, double act Dailey & Wayne, and comedian Norman Collier. Set in the style of a travelogue, the show took the audience to various entertainment, holiday and showbusiness places, starting at ABC's Elstree Studios in London, before visiting Paris, Palma de Majorca, Hollywood, Las Vegas and New York. The production lasted for sixteen weeks, ending on 21 September.

Prior to the commencement of the summer show, an extended play featuring several songs from the show was released in early May, also called Holiday Carnival. It features covers of two popular standards, "Moonlight Bay" and "Some of These Days", as well as a cover of "Carnival" from the film Black Orpheus, and the Richard and Shadows' guitarist Bruce Welch penned song "For You, For Me".

== Track listing ==
Side A
No.	Title	Writer(s)	Length
1.	"Carnival"	Luiz Bonfá; Hugo Peretti; Luigi Creatore; George David Weiss	3:07
2.	"Moonlight Bay"	Edward Madden; Percy Wenrich	2:01

Side B
No.	Title	Writer(s)	Length
3.	"Some of These Days"	Shelton Brooks	2:38
4.	"For You, For Me" (with the Shadows)	Bruce Welch; Cliff Richard	2:14
Total length:			10:00

== Personnel ==
- Cliff Richard – vocals
- The Mike Sammes Singers – backing vocals (1, 2, 3)
- The Norrie Paramor Orchestra – all instrumentation (1, 2, 3), strings (4)
- Hank Marvin – lead guitar (4)
- Bruce Welch – rhythm guitar (4)
- Jet Harris – bass guitar (4)
- Brian Bennett – drums (4)

== Charts ==
Chart (1963)	Peak position
UK Record Retailer Top 20	1
