= A Voice in the Wilderness (song) =

1960 single by Cliff Richard and the Shadows

Single by Cliff Richard and the Shadows
- B-side: "Don't Be Mad at Me"
- Released: 15 January 1960
- Recorded: 20 December 1959
- Studio: EMI Studios, London
- Genre: Pop
- Length: 2:10
- Label: Columbia
- Songwriters: Norrie Paramor; Bunny Lewis
- Producer: Norrie Paramor

Cliff Richard and the Shadows singles chronology
"Travellin' Light" (1959)	"A Voice in the Wilderness" (1960)	"Fall in Love with You" (1960)

"A Voice in the Wilderness" is a song by Cliff Richard and the Shadows, released as a single in January 1960. It peaked at number 2 on the UK Singles Chart and also received a silver disc for 250,000 sales.

== Background and reception ==
"A Voice in the Wilderness" was featured in the film Expresso Bongo and had been included on an EP from the film released in December 1959. Richard first performed the song on 17 January on Tonight at the London Palladium.

The version included on the EP was recorded on 8 September 1959 at EMI Studios, later renamed Abbey Road Studios. The version released as a single was recorded on 20 December and there are some subtle differences in the vocals.

When the song was in the charts, Richard was asked to record it for the BBC radio show Top of the Pops before he went on a tour of the US and Canada. Being a shift from rock and roll, Richard was not enthusiastic about "A Voice in the Wilderness" and instead he decided to record the B-side "Don't Be Mad at Me", which he felt would be more popular. His manager, Tito Burns, was not happy when he found out that Richard had not recorded "A Voice in the Wilderness" and began telling him about the importance of plugging the A-side. Richard stubbornly replied to this by saying that it was his choice and he preferred "Don't Be Mad at Me". Whilst in the US, upon hearing that "A Voice in the Wilderness" was at number 2 on the UK Singles Chart, Richard asked Burns if he thought it would get to number one, to which the reply was that "with a good plug on the radio just now it might". Burns also pointed out that "Those Top Of The Pops programmes will be being broadcast about now, won't they? Now you see why I wanted you to record Voice In The Wilderness".

However, television and record producer Jack Good echoed Richard's thoughts on the record, describing "Don't Be Mad at Me" as "the best [recording] Cliff has ever made" and "A Voice in the Wilderness" as "an interminable drag of the first order".

== Track listing ==
1. "A Voice in the Wilderness" – 2:10
2. "Don't Be Mad at Me" – 2:08

== Personnel ==
- Cliff Richard – vocals
- Hank Marvin – lead guitar
- Bruce Welch – rhythm guitar
- Jet Harris – bass guitar
- Tony Meehan – drums

== Charts ==
Chart (1960–1961)	Peak position
Australia (Kent Music Report)	95
India (The Voice, Bombay)	4
Ireland (Evening Herald)	1
Netherlands (Single Top 100)	14
Norway (VG-lista)	8
Sweden (Sverigetopplistan)	8
UK Singles (OCC)	2

== Cover versions ==
- In 1960, English singer Johnny Worth released a cover of the song as a single.
- In 1962, South African singer Sharon Tandy covered the song on her album Sharon Loves You Know Who?.
- In 1981, Dutch singer Albert West covered the song on his album A Part of Me.
