= The Beatles' Million Sellers =

EP by the Beatles
- Released: 6 December 1965
- Recorded: 1 July 1963 – 18 October 1964
- Studios: EMI, London; Pathé Marconi, Paris
- Genre: Rock
- Length: 9:17
- Label: Parlophone
- Producer: George Martin

The Beatles EP chronology
Beatles for Sale No. 2 (1965)	The Beatles' Million Sellers (1965)	Yesterday (1966)

Professional ratings
Review scores
Source	Rating
AllMusic	4.5/5 stars

The Beatles' Million Sellers is an EP by the Beatles, released on 6 December 1965. The EP was only issued in mono, with the catalogue number Parlophone GEP 8946. It was also released in New Zealand. The EP consists of songs that had sold over 1 million copies each as singles, the biggest seller being "She Loves You", which has sold 1.93 million copies.

All four tracks had previously been number 1 hit singles in the UK chart. Apart from "Can't Buy Me Love", the songs had not appeared on any previous Beatles album. Million Sellers was the second EP compilation of the band's singles following The Beatles' Hits in September 1963.

== Background ==
The Beatles' Million Sellers is the tenth EP released by the Beatles. The EP includes four songs, all released in 1963 and 1964. As of 2007, the combined worldwide sales of all four singles stood at over 27 million copies. These songs all rank in the top 30 UK Million-Selling Singles. The EP itself was number 1 for 4 weeks in early 1966.

== Track listing ==
All songs written by Lennon–McCartney.

Side one

1. "She Loves You" – 2:19
2. "I Want to Hold Your Hand" – 2:24

Side two

1. "Can't Buy Me Love" – 2:15
2. "I Feel Fine" – 2:20

== Personnel ==
According to Ian MacDonald:

The Beatles

- John Lennon – lead vocal, rhythm guitar, handclaps; lead & rhythm guitars ("I Feel Fine")
- Paul McCartney – lead and harmony vocals, bass, handclaps
- George Harrison – harmony vocal, lead guitar, handclaps; lead & rhythm guitars ("I Feel Fine")
- Ringo Starr – drums, handclaps

Production

- George Martin – producer
- Norman Smith – engineer

== See also ==
- Outline of the Beatles
- The Beatles timeline
