= Yesterday (song) =

1965 single by the Beatles

- US picture sleeve

Single by the Beatles

from the album Help!
- B-side: "Act Naturally"
- Released: 6 August 1965 (UK Help! album); 13 September 1965 (US single)
- Recorded: 14, 17 June 1965
- Studio: EMI, London
- Genre: Chamber pop
- Length: 2:03
- Label: Capitol (US), Parlophone (UK)
- Songwriter: Lennon–McCartney
- Producer: George Martin

The Beatles US singles chronology
"Help!" (1965)	"Yesterday" (1965)	"We Can Work It Out" / "Day Tripper" (1965)

The Beatles UK singles chronology
"Let It Be" (1970)	"Yesterday" (1976)	"Back in the U.S.S.R." (1976)

Live video
- "Yesterday" on YouTube

"Yesterday" is a song by the English rock band the Beatles, written and performed by Paul McCartney and credited to Lennon–McCartney. It was first released on the album Help! in August 1965, except in the United States, where it was issued as a single in September. The song reached number one on the US Billboard Hot 100 chart. It subsequently appeared on the UK EP Yesterday in March 1966 and made its US album debut on Yesterday and Today, in June 1966.

McCartney's vocal and acoustic guitar, together with a string quartet, was essentially the band's first solo performance. It remains popular today and, with 2,200 cover versions, is one of the most covered songs in the history of recorded music. (Note: At one time, Guinness World Records cited "Yesterday" with the most cover versions of any song ever written – 2,200. However, "Summertime", an aria composed by George Gershwin for the 1935 opera Porgy and Bess has been claimed to have well over 30,000 recorded performances, far more than the 1,600 claimed for "Yesterday".) "Yesterday" was voted the best song of the 20th century in a 1999 BBC Radio 2 poll of music experts and listeners and was also voted the No. 1 pop song of all time by MTV and Rolling Stone magazine the following year. In 1997, the song was inducted into the Grammy Hall of Fame. Broadcast Music Incorporated (BMI) asserts that it was performed over seven million times in the 20th century.

"Yesterday" is often interpreted as a melancholic ballad about lost love. Paul McCartney later suggested that the lyric "I said something wrong" may have been inspired not by romance but by a childhood memory of mocking his mother for sounding "posh". McCartney is the only member of the Beatles to appear on the track. The final recording was so different from other works by the Beatles that the band members vetoed the song's release as a single in the United Kingdom. However, other artists quickly recorded versions of it for single release. The Beatles' recording was issued in the U.K. as a single in 1976 and peaked at number 8 on the UK Singles Chart.

== Origin ==
According to biographers of Paul McCartney and the Beatles, the entire melody came to McCartney in a dream one night in his room at the Wimpole Street home of his then-girlfriend Jane Asher and her family. Upon waking, he hurried to a piano and played the tune to avoid forgetting it. Initially he was concerned, though, that he had subconsciously plagiarised someone else's work; as he put it: "For about a month I went round to people in the music business and asked them whether they had ever heard it before. Eventually it became like handing something in to the police. I thought if no one claimed it after a few weeks then I could have it."

Upon being convinced that he had not copied the melody, McCartney began writing accompanying lyrics. As John Lennon and McCartney were known to do at the time, they used placeholder words as temporary working lyrics until something more suitable could be written. The working title was "Scrambled Eggs". The working opening verse was "Scrambled eggs/Oh my baby how I love your legs/Not as much as I love scrambled eggs".

During the shooting of Help!, a piano was placed on one of the stages where filming was being conducted, and McCartney took advantage of this opportunity to tinker with the song. This eventually greatly annoyed the director Richard Lester, who lost his temper, telling McCartney to finish writing the song or he would have the piano removed. The patience of the other Beatles was also tested by McCartney's work in progress; George Harrison summed this up when he said: "Blimey, he's always talking about that song. You'd think he was Beethoven or somebody!"

McCartney originally claimed he had written "Yesterday" during the Beatles' tour of France in 1964; however, the song was not released until the summer of 1965. During the intervening time, the Beatles released two albums, A Hard Day's Night and Beatles for Sale, either of which could have included "Yesterday". Although McCartney has never elaborated on his claims, a delay may have been due to a disagreement between McCartney and George Martin regarding the song's arrangement or the opinion of the other Beatles who felt it did not suit their image.

Lennon later indicated that the song had been around for a while before:

The song was around for months and months before we finally completed it. Every time we got together to write songs for a recording session, this one would come up. We almost had it finished. Paul wrote nearly all of it, but we just couldn't find the right title. We called it 'Scrambled Eggs' and it became a joke between us. We made up our minds that only a one-word title would suit, we just couldn't find the right one. Then one morning Paul woke up and the song and the title were both there, completed. I was sorry in a way, we'd had so many laughs about it.

McCartney said the breakthrough with the lyrics came during a trip to Portugal in May 1965:

I remember mulling over the tune 'Yesterday', and suddenly getting these little one-word openings to the verse. I started to develop the idea ... da-da da, yes-ter-day, sud-den-ly, fun-il-ly, mer-il-ly and Yes-ter-day, that's good. All my troubles seemed so far away. It's easy to rhyme those a's: say, nay, today, away, play, stay, there's a lot of rhymes and those fall in quite easily, so I gradually pieced it together from that journey. Sud-den-ly, and 'b' again, another easy rhyme: e, me, tree, flea, we, and I had the basis of it.

On 27 May 1965, McCartney and Asher flew to Lisbon for a holiday in Albufeira, Algarve, and he borrowed an acoustic guitar from Bruce Welch, in whose house they were staying, and completed the work on "Yesterday". The song was offered as a demo to Chris Farlowe before the Beatles recorded it, but he turned it down as he considered it "too soft". In a March 1967 interview with Brian Matthew, McCartney said that Lennon came up with the word that would replace "scrambled eggs": Yesterday.

=== Resemblance to other songs ===
In 2001, Ian Hammond speculated that McCartney subconsciously based "Yesterday" on Ray Charles' version of Hoagy Carmichael's "Georgia on My Mind". Hammond concluded his article by saying that, despite the similarities, "Yesterday" is a "completely original and individual [work]".

In July 2003, British musicologists stumbled upon superficial similarities between the lyric and rhyming schemes of "Yesterday" and David Whitfield's, Frankie Laine's, and Nat King Cole's "Answer Me, My Love"; originally a German song by Gerhard Winkler and Fred Rauch called "Mütterlein", it was a number 1 hit for Laine on the UK Singles Chart in 1953 as "Answer Me, O Lord", leading to speculation that the song had influenced McCartney. McCartney's publicists denied any resemblance between "Answer Me, My Love" and "Yesterday".

== Composition and structure ==
"Yesterday" sample

Ostensibly simple, featuring only McCartney playing an Epiphone Texan steel-string acoustic guitar backed by a string quartet in one of the Beatles' first uses of session musicians, "Yesterday" has two contrasting sections, differing in melody and rhythm, producing a sense of variety and fitting contrast. The main melody is seven bars in length, extremely rare in popular songs, while the bridge, or "middle eight", is the more standard form of eight bars, often two four-bar phrases combined.

The first section ("Yesterday, all my troubles seemed so far away ...") opens with an F chord (the 3rd of the chord is omitted), then moving to Em^{7} before proceeding to A^{7} and then to D minor. In this sense, the opening chord is a decoy; as musicologist Alan Pollack points out, the home key (F major) has little time to establish itself before "heading towards the relative D minor". He points out that this diversion is a compositional device commonly used by Lennon and McCartney, which he describes as "deferred gratification".

As is often the case with the over-exposed war horses of any artsy genre, whether or not you "like" this song, there's some good reason why it became so over-exposed in the first place. (hint) It's a fine piece of work with something going for it in virtually every department: the unique arrangement, an attractive tune, even some asymmetrical phrasing and a couple of off-beat chord progressions.

— Musicologist Alan W. Pollack, 1993

According to Pollack, the second section ("Why she had to go I don't know ...") is less musically surprising on paper than it sounds. Starting with Em^{7}, the harmonic progression quickly moves through the A major, D minor, and (closer to F major) B♭, before resolving back to F major, and at the end of this, McCartney holds F while the strings descend to resolve to the home key to introduce the restatement of the first section, before a brief hummed closing phrase.

Pollack described the scoring as "truly inspired", citing it as an example of "[Lennon & McCartney's] flair for creating stylistic hybrids"; in particular, he praises the "ironic tension drawn between the schmaltzy content of what is played by the quartet and the restrained, spare nature of the medium in which it is played".

The tonic key of the song is F major (although, since McCartney tuned his guitar down a whole step, he was playing the chords as if it were in G), where the song begins before veering off into the key of D minor. It is this frequent use of the minor, and the ii–V7 chord progression (Em and A^{7} chords in this case) leading into it, that gives the song its melancholic aura. The A^{7} chord is an example of a secondary dominant, specifically a V/vi chord. The G^{7} chord in the bridge is another secondary dominant, in this case a V/V chord, but rather than resolve it to the expected chord, as with the A^{7} to Dm in the verse, McCartney instead follows it with the IV chord, a B♭. This motion creates a descending chromatic line of C–B–B♭–A to accompany the title lyric.

The string arrangement reinforces the song's air of sadness in the groaning cello line that connects the two halves of the bridge, notably the "blue" seventh in the second bridge pass (the E♭ played after the vocal line "I don't know / she wouldn't say") and in the descending run by the viola that segues the bridge back into the verses, mimicked by McCartney's vocal on the second pass of the bridge. This viola line, the "blue" cello phrase, the high A sustained by the violin over the final verse and the minimal use of vibrato are elements of the string arrangement attributable to McCartney rather than George Martin.

When the song was performed on The Ed Sullivan Show, it was done in the key mentioned above of F, with McCartney as the only Beatle to perform and the studio orchestra providing the string accompaniment. However, all of the Beatles played in a G-major version when the song was included in tours in 1965 and 1966.

When McCartney appeared on The Howard Stern Show, he stated that he owned the original lyrics to "Yesterday" written on the back of an envelope. McCartney later performed the original "Scrambled Eggs" version of the song, plus additional new lyrics, with Jimmy Fallon and the Roots on Late Night with Jimmy Fallon.

When asked whether some of the lyrics from "Yesterday" are a reference to his early loss of his mother, Mary McCartney, he stated that "I didn't mean it to be, but ... it could be".

== Recording ==
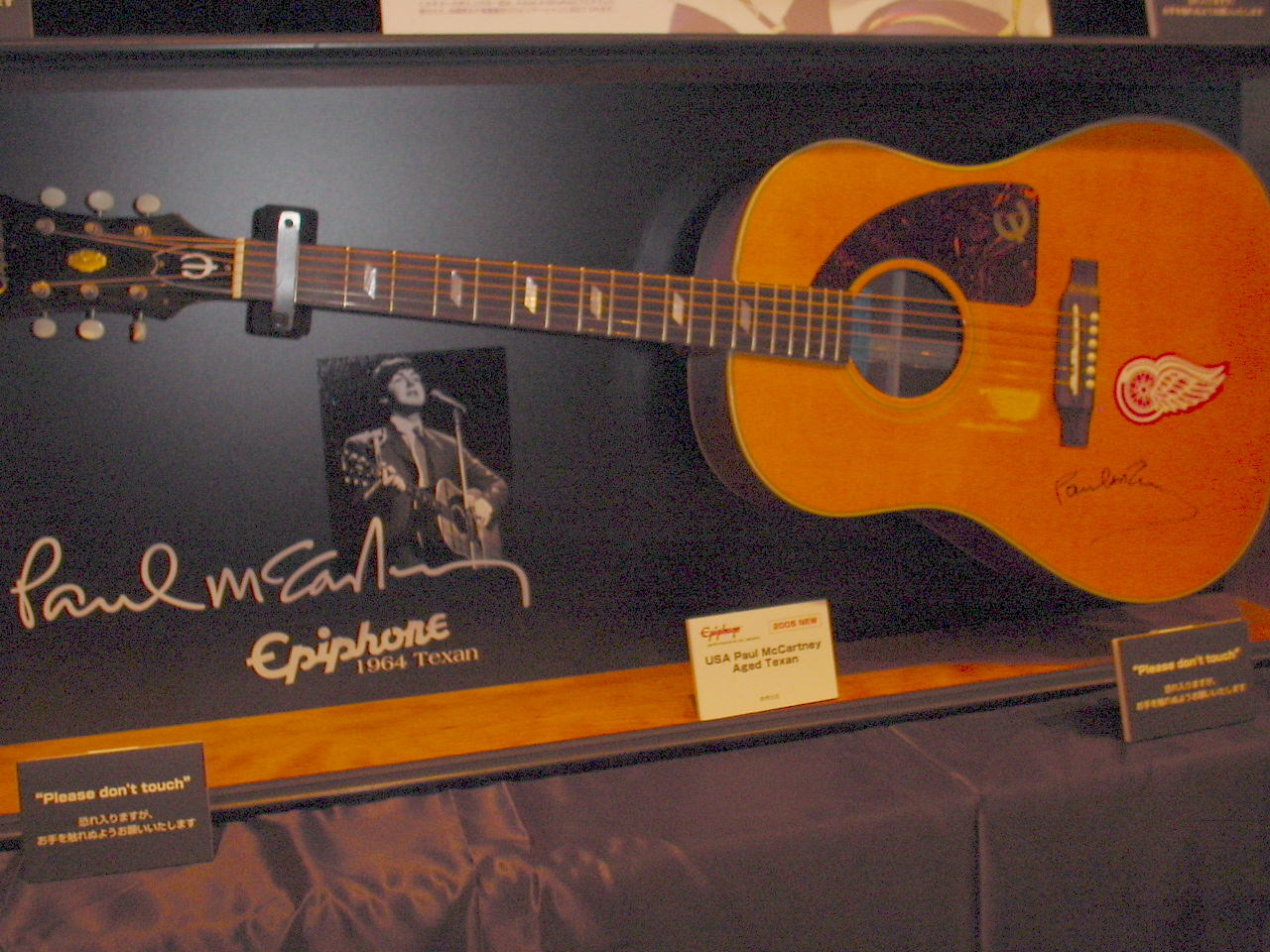
Replica of the Epiphone Texan acoustic guitar played by McCartney on the song

The track was recorded at Abbey Road Studios on 14 June 1965, immediately following the taping of "I'm Down" and four days before McCartney's 23rd birthday. There are conflicting accounts of how the song was recorded. Some sources state that McCartney and the other Beatles tried a variety of instruments, including drums and an organ, and that George Martin later persuaded them to allow McCartney to play his Epiphone Texan steel-string acoustic guitar, later overdubbing a string quartet for backup. Regardless, none of the other band members were included in the final recording.

McCartney performed two takes of "Yesterday" on 14 June 1965. Take 2 was deemed better and used as the master take. On 17 June, an additional vocal track by McCartney and a string quartet were overdubbed on take two and that version was released.

Take 1, without the string overdub, was later released on the Anthology 2 compilation. On take 1, McCartney can be heard giving chord changes to Harrison before starting. Still, while Harrison does not appear actually to play, he is most certainly present because his voice is captured on the session tapes. Take 2 had two lines transposed from the first take: "There's a shadow hanging over me"/"I'm not half the man I used to be", though it seems clear that their order in take 2 was the correct one because McCartney can be heard, in take 1, suppressing a laugh at his mistake.

In 2006, just before the album Love was released, George Martin elaborated on the recording set-up of the song:

Paul played his guitar and sang it live, a mic on the guitar and mic on the voice. But, of course, the voice comes on to the guitar mic and the guitar comes on to the voice mic. So there's leakage there. Then I said I'd do a string quartet. The musicians objected to playing with headphones, so I gave them Paul's voice and guitar on two speakers either side of their microphones. So there's leakage of Paul's guitar and voice on the string tracks.

The sound leakage from one track to another caused concern when the surround version of the song was mixed for Love, but it was decided to include the track nevertheless. As Martin explained in the liner notes of Love:

We agonised over the inclusion of "Yesterday" in the show. It is such a famous song, the icon of an era, but had it been heard too much? The story of the addition of the original string quartet is well known, however, few people know how limited the recording was technically, and so the case for not including it was strong, but how could we ignore such a marvellous work? We introduced it with some of Paul's guitar work from "Blackbird", and hearing it now, I know it was right to include it. Its simplicity is so direct; it tugs at the heartstrings.

== Release ==
Concerning the debate on how the song should be released, Martin later said: "['Yesterday'] wasn't really a Beatles record and I discussed this with Brian Epstein: 'You know this is Paul's song ... shall we call it Paul McCartney?' He said 'No, whatever we do we are not splitting up the Beatles.'" Since "Yesterday" was unlike the Beatles' previous work and did not fit in with their image, the Beatles refused to permit the release of a single in the United Kingdom. This did not prevent Matt Monro from recording the first of many cover versions of "Yesterday". His version made it into the top ten in the UK charts soon after its release in the autumn of 1965.

The Beatles' influence over their US record label, Capitol, was not as strong as it was over EMI's Parlophone label in Britain. A single was released in the US, pairing "Yesterday" with "Act Naturally", a track which featured vocals by Ringo Starr. The single was released on 13 September 1965 and topped the Billboard Hot 100 chart for four weeks, beginning on 9 October. The song spent a total of 11 weeks on the chart, selling a million copies within five weeks. The single was also number one for three weeks on the US Cash Box pop singles chart the same year.

"Yesterday" was the fifth of six number-one Beatles singles in a row on the American charts, a record at the time. The other singles were "I Feel Fine", "Eight Days a Week", "Ticket to Ride", "Help!" and "We Can Work It Out". On 4 March 1966, the song was issued as the title track of the British EP Yesterday. On 26 March, the EP went to number one, a position it held for two months. Later that year, "Yesterday" was included as the title track of the North American album Yesterday and Today.

"Yesterday" was released on the album A Collection of Beatles Oldies, a compilation album released in the United Kingdom in December 1966, featuring hit singles and other songs issued by the group between 1963 and 1966.

On 8 March 1976, "Yesterday" was released by Parlophone as a single in the UK, featuring "I Should Have Known Better" on the B-side. The single peaked at number 8 on the UK Singles Chart. The release came about due to the expiration of the Beatles' contract with EMI, which allowed the company to repackage the Beatles' recordings as they wished. EMI reissued all 22 of the Beatles' UK singles, plus "Yesterday", on the same day, leading to six of them placing on the UK chart.

In 2006, a version of the song was included on the album Love. The version begins with the acoustic guitar intro from the song "Blackbird" transposed down a whole step to F major from its original key G to transition smoothly into "Yesterday".

== Reception and legacy ==
"Yesterday" is one of the most recorded songs in the history of popular music. Its entry in Guinness World Records states that, by January 1986, 1,600 cover versions had been made. After Muzak switched in the 1990s to programs based on commercial recordings, its inventory grew to include about 500 "Yesterday" covers. In his 1972 article on the development of rock music, Joel Vance of Stereo Review magazine credited the song with originating the vogue for classical and baroque rock, anticipating the Rolling Stones' recording of "As Tears Go By" and works by artists such as the Moody Blues and the Classics IV.

"Yesterday" won the Ivor Novello Award for "Outstanding Song of 1965", and came second in the "Most Performed Work of the Year" category, behind the Lennon–McCartney composition "Michelle". More recently, Rolling Stone ranked "Yesterday" at number 13 on its 2004 list "The 500 Greatest Songs of All Time" and fourth on its 2010 list of "The Beatles' 100 Greatest Songs". In 1999, Broadcast Music Incorporated (BMI) placed "Yesterday" third on its list of songs of the 20th century most performed on American radio and television, with approximately seven million performances. "Yesterday" was surpassed only by the Association's "Never My Love" and the Righteous Brothers' "You've Lost That Lovin' Feelin'". "Yesterday" was voted Best Song of the 20th century in a 1999 BBC Radio 2 poll.

The song was inducted into the Grammy Hall of Fame in 1997. Although it was nominated for Song of the Year at the 1966 Grammy Awards, it lost out to Tony Bennett's "The Shadow of Your Smile". "Yesterday" was nominated for six Grammys in total that year, and "Help!" was also nominated in four categories. After the band had failed to win any of the ten awards, Alan Livingston, the head of Capitol Records, officially protested about the results, saying that "Yesterday" being passed over for the Song of the Year "makes a mockery of the whole event".

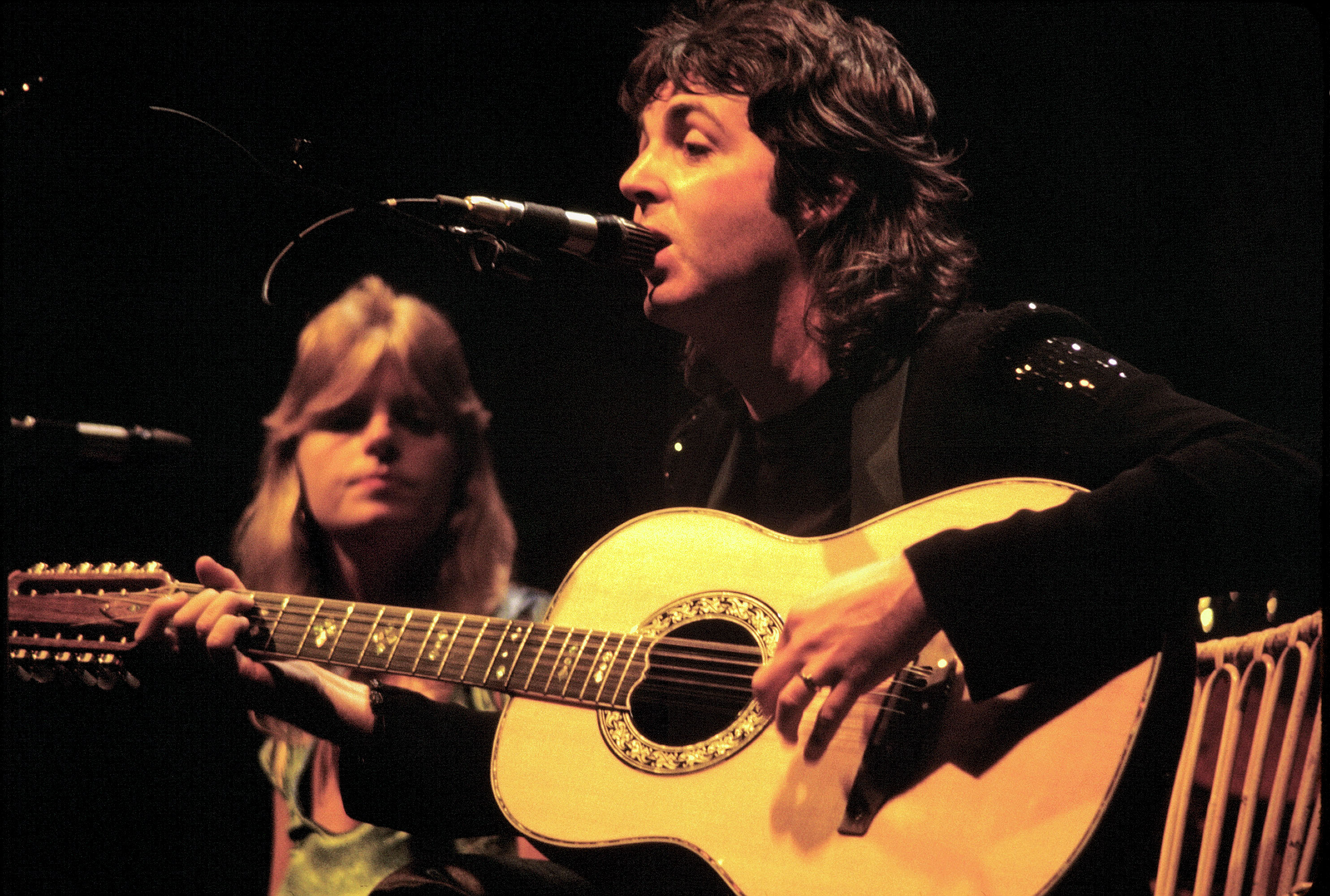
Following the Beatles' break-up, McCartney (pictured with his wife Linda in 1976) began performing the song live in 1975 during his Wings Over the World tour.

Chuck Berry said that "Yesterday" was the song that he wished that he had written. "Yesterday" has also been criticised for being mundane and mawkish. Bob Dylan had a marked dislike for the song, stating that "If you go into the Library of Congress, you can find a lot better than that. There are millions of songs like 'Michelle' and 'Yesterday' written in Tin Pan Alley." Accompanied by Harrison, Dylan recorded his own version of "Yesterday" four years later, on 1 May 1970, but it was never released.

Shortly before he died in 1980, Lennon commented, "Although the lyrics don't resolve into any sense, they're good lines. They certainly work ... but if you read the whole song, it doesn't say anything" and added the song was "beautiful – and I never wished I'd written it". Lennon made reference to "Yesterday" in his song "How Do You Sleep?" on his 1971 album Imagine. The song appears to attack McCartney with the line "The only thing you done was yesterday, but since you've gone you're just another day", a reference to McCartney's then recent hit "Another Day".

In 2001, McCartney said that he had asked Yoko Ono to agree to change the writing credit for "Yesterday" from "Lennon/McCartney" to "McCartney/Lennon". He said that Ono refused, which was one of the reasons for their poor relationship at the time.

At the 2006 Grammy Awards, McCartney performed "Yesterday" live as a mash-up with Linkin Park and Jay Z's "Numb/Encore".

In 2012, the BBC reported that "Yesterday" remained the fourth-most-successful song of all time in terms of royalties paid, having amassed a total of £19.5 million in payments.

== Personnel ==
According to Mark Lewisohn and Ian MacDonald:

The Beatles

- Paul McCartney – vocals, acoustic guitar

Additional musicians and production

- Tony Gilbert – violin
- Sidney Sax – violin
- Kenneth Essex – viola
- Peter Halling/Francisco Gabarró – cello
- George Martin – producer, string arrangement
- Norman Smith – engineer

== Charts ==
=== Weekly charts ===
Original weekly chart performance
Chart (1965)	Peak position
Australian (Kent Music Report)	2
Austria (Ö3 Austria Top 40)	10
Belgium (Ultratop 50 Flanders)	1
Denmark (Salgshitlisterne Top 20)	7
Finland (Suomen virallinen lista)	1
Canada Top Singles (RPM)	4
Italy (Musica e Dischi)	15
Netherlands (Single Top 100)	1
New Zealand (Lever Hit Parade)	2
Norway (VG-lista)	1
Sweden (Kvällstoppen)	1
Sweden (Tio i Topp)	1
US Billboard Hot 100	1
US Cash Box Top 100	1
West German Media Control Singles Chart	6

Reissue weekly chart performance
Chart (1976)	Peak position
Australian (Kent Music Report)	86
Netherlands (Single Top 100)	26
Ireland (IRMA)	4
UK Singles (Official Charts)	8
Chart (2010)	Peak position
Spain (Promusicae)	44
Poland Airplay (ZPAV)	5
Chart (2019)	Peak position
US Hot Rock & Alternative Songs (Billboard)	14

=== Year-end charts ===
Chart (1965)	Peak Rank
US Cash Box	68

== Certifications ==
Region	Certification	Certified units/sales
Denmark (IFPI Danmark)	Gold	45,000^{‡}
France	—	75,000
Italy (FIMI) sales since 2009	Gold	25,000^{‡}
New Zealand (RMNZ)	2× Platinum	60,000^{‡}
Portugal (AFP)	Gold	20,000^{‡}
Spain (Promusicae)	Platinum	60,000^{‡}
United Kingdom (BPI) sales since 2010	Platinum	600,000^{‡}
United States (RIAA)	Gold	1,800,000
Summaries
Worldwide	—	2,500,000
^{‡} Sales+streaming figures based on certification alone.
