= The Shadows (EP) =

EP by The Shadows
- Released: January 1961
- Genre: Pop
- Label: EMI Columbia
- Producer: Norrie Paramor
- Compiler: Glimston Ice Thee

The Shadows chronology
The Shadows (1961)	The Shadows to the Fore (1961)

The Shadows is an EP by The Shadows, released in January 1961. The EP is a 7-inch vinyl record and released in mono with the catalogue number Columbia SEG 8061 and in stereo with the catalogue number Columbia ESG 7834. The Shadows was the UK number-one EP for 20 weeks, having two separate stints at the top of the chart from January to June 1961. The cover photograph was taken by Angus McBean. The original picture showed Cliff together with the Shadows, however the layout for the EP was adapted and Cliff was replaced by yellow triangles.

== Track listing ==
Side A

1. "Mustang" (Jerry Lordan, Tom Mould)
2. "Theme from Shane" (Victor Young, Mack David)

Side B

3. "Shotgun" ("Jon Allen"; a collective pseudonym for Hank Marvin, Jet Harris, and Bruce Welch)
4. "Theme from Giant" (Paul Francis Webster, Dimitri Tiomkin)

== Background ==
Hank Marvin, Jet Harris, Bruce Welch, and Tony Meehan rose to fame as The Shadows, the backing band for Cliff Richard. They went on to achieve individual success with "Apache" and in 1961 released their first EP consisting of "four new offerings". None of the tracks were released as singles in the UK. All the tracks featured on the 1961 South African album Rockin' Guitars, and the 1963 French album Hurrah! For The Shadows. However, the tracks did not feature on a UK album until Mustang was released under the Music for Pleasure label in 1971. They also all featured on their album The EP Collection released under the See for Miles Records in 1988.

== Chart performance ==
Beginning in 1960s, in addition to publishing a long play (LP) chart, Record Retailer also ran an EP chart. The Shadows was released in January 1961 and became a number-one EP on 28 January 1961. Replacing Adam Faith's Adam's Hit Parade it stayed at the top for 17 weeks before being displaced by Faith's EP again in May for one week before reclaiming the top spot on 3 June for a further 3 weeks. Their eponymous EP was replaced their second EP, The Shadows to the Fore, which broke the record for consecutive weeks at number one (23 weeks). In total, The Shadows EP amassed 20 weeks at the top of the EP chart.

== Personnel ==
- Hank Marvin – lead guitar
- Bruce Welch – rhythm guitar
- Jet Harris – bass guitar
- Tony Meehan – drums
