= Yesterday (Beatles EP) =

EP by the Beatles
- Released: 4 March 1966
- Recorded: 17 February – 17 June 1965
- Studios: EMI, London
- Length: 8:52
- Label: Parlophone
- Producer: George Martin

The Beatles EP chronology
The Beatles' Million Sellers (1965)	Yesterday (1966)	Nowhere Man (1966)

Professional ratings
Review scores
Source	Rating
Allmusic	4/5 stars

Yesterday is an EP by the English rock band the Beatles, released on 4 March 1966 by Parlophone in the UK. The Beatles' 11th EP, it was also released in Portugal, Spain and Brazil (with another cover photo). The EP was released in mono only, and the cover photograph was taken by Robert Whitaker.

Yesterday entered the UK EP chart on 12 March 1966, and from 26 March spent six weeks at number one. In all, it remained on the hit parade for 13 weeks.

== Track listing ==
Side A

1. "Yesterday" (Lennon–McCartney) – 2:03
2. "Act Naturally" (Johnny Russell, Voni Morrison) – 2:33

Side B

1. "You Like Me Too Much" (Harrison) – 2:40
2. "It's Only Love" (Lennon–McCartney) – 1:53

== Personnel ==
The Beatles

- Paul McCartney – bass guitar (tracks 2–4), lead vocals (track 1), acoustic guitar (track 1), background vocals (tracks 2, 3), piano (track 3)
- John Lennon – acoustic rhythm guitar (2–4), electric piano (track 3), tambourine (track 3), lead vocals (track 4), electric guitar (track 4)
- George Harrison – lead guitar (tracks 2–4), lead vocals (track 3), electric guitar (track 3), acoustic guitar (track 3), 12-string acoustic guitar (track 4)
- Ringo Starr – drums (tracks 2–4), lead vocals (track 2), sticks (track 2), tambourine (track 4)

Additional musicians

- George Martin – piano ("You Like Me Too Much")
- Tony Gilbert – violin ("Yesterday")
- Sidney Sax – violin ("Yesterday")
- Kenneth Essex – viola ("Yesterday")
- Francisco Gabarro – cello ("Yesterday")

== See also ==
- Outline of the Beatles
- The Beatles timeline
