= Helen's Hit Parade =

EP by Helen Shapiro
- Released: February 1962
- Recorded: 1961
- Genre: Pop
- Label: EMI Columbia

Helen Shapiro EPs chronology
| Helen (1961) | Helen's Hit Parade (1962) | More Hits from Helen (1962) |

Helen's Hit Parade is an EP by singer Helen Shapiro. It was released in February 1962 and reached number one in the UK EPs Chart in the week ending 24 March 1962, remaining at the top of the chart for three weeks, and subsequently returning to the top for one further week, ending 26 May 1962.

The EP collected the A-sides of Shapiro's three hit singles from 1961, along with the B-side of the first. Martin Slavin was the director of the musical accompaniment, except on "Walkin' Back to Happiness" where Norrie Paramor was the musical director.

== Track listing ==
Side A

1. "Don't Treat Me Like a Child" (John Schroeder)
2. "You Don't Know" (John Schroeder, Mike Hawker)

Side B

3. "Walkin' Back to Happiness"
4. "When I'm With You" (John Schroeder, Mike Hawker, Maurice Burman)

== Charts ==
Chart performance for Helen's Hit Parade
| Chart (1962) | Peak position |
|---|---|
| UK EP Charts (Record Retailer ) | 1 |
