= Helen (EP) =

EP by Helen Shapiro
- Released: November 1961
- Genre: Jazz
- Label: EMI Columbia

Helen Shapiro chronology
| Helen (1961) | Helen's Hit Parade (1962) |

Professional ratings
Review scores
| Source | Rating |
|---|---|
| New Record Mirror | 4/5 |

Helen is an EP of jazz standards by singer Helen Shapiro. It was released in November 1961 and reached number one in the UK EPs Chart in the week ending 2 December 1961, remaining at the top of the chart for nine weeks.

Helen was Shapiro's first EP and her fourth release overall, following three hit singles. The record was Shapiro's first in a predominantly jazz style, a genre with which she would become more closely associated from the 1970s onward.

The EP was released in both mono and stereo versions. The songs were orchestrated and conducted by Martin Slavin.

== Track listing ==
Side A

1. "Goody Goody" (Johnny Mercer, Matty Malneck)
2. "The Birth of the Blues" (Ray Henderson, Buddy G. DeSylva, Lew Brown)

Side B

3. "Tiptoe Through the Tulips" (Al Dubin, Joe Burke)
4. "After You've Gone" (Henry Creamer, Turner Layton)
