= Julian More =

British writer (1928–2010)

Julian Bensley More (15 June 1928 – 15 January 2010) was a British writer, best known for book and lyrics to musicals Grab Me a Gondola, Expresso Bongo, Songbook and the English-language version of Irma La Douce.

More was born in Wales and educated at Stowe and Trinity College, Cambridge, where he wrote and performed with the Cambridge Footlights.

He wrote script translation and lyrics for the English-language film version of The Young Girls of Rochefort (Les demoiselles de Rochefort). He also wrote English lyrics for many French popular song hits, include some by Françoise Hardy.

His screenwriting credits include the films Chanel Solitaire (1981), The Catamount Killing (1974) and Incense for the Damned (1971).

More's later travel and food writing includes Views from a French Farmhouse (1985), A Taste of Provence (1988) and A Taste of Burgundy (1993).
