= Expresso Bongo =

Stage musical

- Music: David Heneker, Monty Norman
- Lyrics: Julian More, Monty Norman
- Book: Wolf Mankowitz, Julian More
- Basis: satire of the music industry
- Premiere: 1958: Saville Theatre, London

Expresso Bongo is a 1958 West End musical and a satire of the music industry. It was first produced on the stage at the Saville Theatre, London, on 23 April 1958. Its book was written by Wolf Mankowitz and Julian More, with music by David Heneker and Monty Norman, also the co-lyricist with Julian More. The production starred Paul Scofield with Hy Hazell, Millicent Martin and James Kenney. Musical director was Burt Rhodes and director William Chappell.

== Film version ==
The subsequent Expresso Bongo 1959 film version was directed by Val Guest and starred Laurence Harvey and Cliff Richard, the latter's second musical film, after Serious Charge.

== Plot ==
Paul Scofield played Johnny, a slimy, small-time music promoter and talent scout who notices teenage girls going crazy for the singing and bongo playing of talentless and seemingly idiotic Herbert Rudge (played by James Kenney). Johnny rechristens Rudge as "Bongo Herbert" and signs him to a contract that gives Johnny a 50% share of the profits. With Johnny's help, Bongo rockets to stardom. Bongo's success attracts a host of sleazy music industry types intent on exploiting him. Johnny quickly finds himself outclassed in the sleaze department as Bongo turns out to be the slipperiest slime of them all.

== Music ==
The writers of the 1958 musical were inspired by songwriters such as Noël Coward. (David Heneker said his musical career was inspired by reading the score of Noel Coward's Bitter Sweet). Their lyrics were clever, wordy and allusive: "The Gravy Train", for example, has Johnny quoting an apt line from Shakespeare's Troilus and Cressida, (Act 5, Scene X), while the unrepentant shopaholics in "We Bought It" describe themselves as "two eccentric socialites, dissipated sybarites". The tunes modulate all over the place and parody rock, Latin jazz, skiffle and trad.

Music historian John Snelsen writes,

Expresso Bongo

Soundtrack album by Original cast recording
- Released: 1979
- Label: AEL Records

Expresso Bongo opened in the West End in the same year as My Fair Lady. It did not run as long and has hardly been seen since, but its gritty cynicism, contemporary setting and pop score gained it many fans. It was voted Best British Musical of the Year in a Variety annual survey of shows on the London stage, with a ballot result far ahead of My Fair Lady, and was referred to in general as 'the other musical' to distinguish it from Lerner and Loewe's work.

== List of tracks ==
The 1958 Original Cast Recording lists the following songs and singers:

1. Overture: Orchestra
2. Don't Sell Me Down the River: James Kenney
3. Expresso Party: James Kenney
4. Nausea: Meier Tzelniker
5. Spoil the Child: Millicent Martin
6. Seriously: Millicent Martin
7. I Never Had It So Good: Paul Scofield
8. There's Nothing Wrong With British Youth Today: Ensemble
9. The Shrine on the Second Floor
10. He's Got Something for the Public: Hy Hazell & Principals
11. I Am: Millicent Martin
12. Nothing is for Nothing: Meier Tzelniker, Hy Hazell & Paul Scofield
13. We Bought It: Hy Hazel & Elizabeth Ashley
14. Time: Hy Hazell
15. The Gravy Train: Paul Scofield
16. Finale: The Company
