= Bra (song) =

Song written by Patrick Patterson and Steve Scipio

Single by Cymande

from the album Cymande
- B-side: "Ras Tafarian Folk Song"
- Released: 1973
- Studio: De Lane Lea Studios (London, England)
- Genre: Funk
- Length: 5:00 (album version); 3:48 (single version)
- Label: Janus Records; J 215
- Songwriters: Patrick Eaton Patterson; Steve Scipio
- Producer: John Schroeder

Cymande singles chronology
"The Message" (1972)	"Bra" (1973)	"Fug" (1973)

"Bra" is a song by British funk band Cymande from their self-titled debut studio album Cymande. Written by the group's members Patrick Patterson and Steve Scipio, it was recorded at De Lane Lea Studios in London, produced by John Schroeder, and released as a 7-inch single first in 1972 and then through Janus Records in 1973. Released as the second single from the album, the song peaked at No. 51 on the Soul Singles Billboard chart in the United States.

The song featured in Spike Lee's 1994 film Crooklyn as well as on its soundtrack album. It also appeared in John Jacobsen's 1998 film Around the Fire, Spike Lee's 2002 film 25th Hour, Martin Gero's 2007 film Young People Fucking, and The Worst Person in the World.

== Track listing ==
Bra 7-inch
No.	Title	Writer(s)	Producer(s)	Length
1.	"Bra"	Patrick Patterson; Steve Scipio	John Schroeder	3:48
2.	"Ras Tafarian Folk Song"	Mike Rose; Pablo Gonzales	John Schroeder	3:08

== Personnel ==
- Ray King – vocals, percussion
- Peter Serreo – tenor saxophone
- Michael "Bami" Rose – alto saxophone, flute, bongos
- Pablo Gonsales – Congas
- Sam Kelly – drums
- Joey Dee – vocals, percussion
- Derek Gibbs – alto and soprano saxophone
- Steve Scipio – bass, songwriter
- Patrick Eaton Patterson – guitar, songwriter
- John Schroeder – producer

== Charts ==
Chart (1973)	Peak position
US Hot R&B/Hip-Hop Songs (Billboard)	51

== Sampled credits ==
The song was sampled by several hip hop recording artists, including:

- Sugarhill Gang in "Work, Work, the Body", released as a single (1985)
- Gang Starr in "Movin' On" from No More Mr. Nice Guy (1989)
- Arabian Prince in "SItuation Critical" from Brother Arab (1989)
- De La Soul in "Change in Speak" from 3 Feet High and Rising (1989)
- Def Jef in "Give It Here" from Just a Poet with a Soul (1989)

It was more recently sampled in R&B artist Vivian Green's "Work" on her album Vivid (2015).
