= Crooklyn (soundtrack) =

1994 film soundtrack

Crooklyn, Volume 1: Music from the Motion Picture

Soundtrack album by various artists
- Released: May 10, 1994
- Genres: R&B; pop; soul; jazz; funk
- Length: 56:36
- Labels: MCA Records; MCAD-11036
- Producer: Spike Lee (exec.)

Singles from Crooklyn, Volume 1: Music from the Motion Picture
- 1. "Crooklyn" Released: January 1994

Crooklyn, Volume II: Music from the Motion Picture

Soundtrack album by various artists
- Released: 1995
- Genres: R&B; pop; soul; jazz; funk
- Length: 55:53
- Labels: MCA Records; MCAD-11065
- Producer: Spike Lee (exec.)

Professional ratings
Review scores
Source	Rating
AllMusic	4.5/5 stars

Professional ratings
Review scores
Source	Rating
AllMusic	3/5 stars

Crooklyn is the title of the soundtrack to the 1994 Spike Lee film of the same name. The soundtrack was released in two parts. Volume 1 was released May 10, 1994 just prior to the film's release and Volume II was released in 1995, both on MCA Records. The soundtrack albums feature music that was popular during the 1970s, two exceptions being "Crooklyn" by The Crooklyn Dodgers and "People Make the World Go Round" by Marc Dorsey, both of which were recorded specifically for the film. The two albums comprise 28 songs from the film, though some tracks, such as "Hey Joe" by The Jimi Hendrix Experience are omitted from both releases.

== Track listing ==
=== Volume 1 ===
Crooklyn, Volume 1: Music from the Motion Picture
No.	Title	Producer(s)	Length
1.	"Crooklyn" (performed by the Crooklyn Dodgers)	A Tribe Called Quest	4:32
2.	"Respect Yourself" (performed by The Staple Singers)	Al Bell	4:53
3.	"Everyday People" (performed by Sly and the Family Stone)	Sly Stone	2:19
4.	"Pusherman" (performed by Curtis Mayfield)	Curtis Mayfield	5:02
5.	"Thin Line Between Love and Hate" (performed by The Persuaders)	The Poindexter Brothers	3:24
6.	"El Pito (I'll Never Go Back to Georgia)" (performed by Joe Cuba)	Pancho Cristal	5:32
7.	"ABC" (performed by The Jackson 5)	The Corporation	2:58
8.	"Oh Girl" (performed by The Chi-Lites)	Eugene Record	3:47
9.	"Mighty Love" (performed by The Spinners)	Thom Bell	4:57
10.	"Mr. Big Stuff" (performed by Jean Knight)	Wardell Quezergue	2:46
11.	"O-o-h Child" (performed by the Five Stairsteps)	Stan Vincent	3:17
12.	"Pass the Peas" (performed by The J.B.'s)	James Brown	3:11
13.	"Time Has Come Today" (performed by The Chambers Brothers)	David Rubinson	4:54
14.	"People Make the World Go Round" (performed by Marc Dorsey)	Narada Michael Walden	5:06
Total length:			56:36

=== Volume II ===
Crooklyn, Volume II: Music from the Motion Picture
No.	Title	Producer(s)	Length
1.	"People Make the World Go Round" (performed by The Stylistics)	Thom Bell	6:22
2.	"Signed, Sealed, Delivered I'm Yours" (performed by Stevie Wonder)	Stevie Wonder	2:38
3.	"Bra" (performed by Cymande)	John Schroeder	5:02
4.	"I'm Stone in Love with You" (performed by The Stylistics)	Thom Bell	3:17
5.	"Everybody Is a Star" (performed by Sly and the Family Stone)	Sly Stone	3:00
6.	"Never Can Say Goodbye" (performed by The Jackson 5)	Hal Davis	2:56
7.	"Soul Power" (performed by James Brown)	James Brown	4:23
8.	"Soul Makossa" (performed by Manu DiBango)		4:25
9.	"La-La (Means I Love You)" (performed by The Delfonics)	Thom Bell; Stan Watson	3:19
10.	"I'll Take You There" (performed by The Staple Singers)	Al Bell	4:31
11.	"Puerto Rico" (performed by Eddie Palmieri)	Eddie Palmieri; Harvey Averne	6:57
12.	"Theme from Shaft" (performed by Isaac Hayes)	Isaac Hayes	3:19
13.	"The Tears of a Clown" (performed by Smokey Robinson & The Miracles)	Hank Cosby; Smokey Robinson	3:03
14.	"I Can See Clearly Now" (performed by Johnny Nash)	Johnny Nash	2:41
Total length:			55:53

== Charts ==
Chart (1994)	Peak position
US Billboard 200	59
US Top R&B/Hip-Hop Albums (Billboard)	10
