= Second Time Round =

Studio album by Cymande
- Released: 1973
- Studio: De Lane Lea Studios (London, England)
- Genre: Funk
- Label: Janus Records
- Producer: John Schroeder

Cymande chronology
Cymande (1972)	Second Time Round (1973)	Promised Heights (1974)

Singles from Cymande
- 1. "FUG" Released: 1973

Professional ratings
Review scores
Source	Rating
AllMusic	3/5 stars
Christgau's Record Guide	B

Second Time Round is the second studio album by British funk group Cymande. It was released in 1973 through Janus Records and produced entirely by John Schroeder. Recording sessions took place at De Lane Lea Studios in London.

The album peaked at number 180 on the Billboard 200 and number 41 on the Top R&B/Hip-Hop Albums in the United States. Its lead single "Fug" later appeared in the 2007 video game Tony Hawk's Proving Ground.

== Track listing ==
No.	Title	Writer(s)	Length
1.	"Anthracite"	Patrick Patterson; Steve Scipio	5:32
2.	"Willies' Headache"	Patrick Patterson; Steve Scipio	4:50
3.	"Genevieve"	Patrick Patterson; Steve Scipio	3:50
4.	"Trevorgus"	Michael "Bami" Rose; Pablo Gonsales	3:25
5.	"To You"	Patrick Patterson; Steve Scipio	3:31
6.	"For Baby Ooh"	Patrick Patterson; Steve Scipio	2:17
7.	"FUG"	Patrick Patterson; Steve Scipio	4:25
8.	"Crawshay"	Patrick Patterson; Steve Scipio	4:21
9.	"Bird"	Patrick Patterson; Steve Scipio	4:25
10.	"Them and Us"	George Kelly	5:25

== Personnel ==
- Ray King – vocals, percussion
- Peter Serreo – tenor saxophone
- Michael "Bami" Rose – alto saxophone, flute, bongos
- Pablo Gonsales – Congas
- Sam Kelly – drums
- Joey Dee – vocals, percussion
- Derek Gibbs – alto and soprano saxophone
- Steve Scipio – bass
- Patrick Eaton Patterson – guitar
- John Schroeder – producer, liner notes
- Mia Krinsky – coordinator

== Charts ==
Chart (1973)	Peak position
US Billboard 200	180
US Top R&B/Hip-Hop Albums (Billboard)	41
