= Cymande (album) =

Studio album by Cymande
- Released: 1972
- Studios: De Lane Lea Studios (London, England)
- Genres: Funk, jazz fusion
- Length: 44:35
- Label: Janus Records
- Producer: John Schroeder

Cymande chronology
Cymande (1972)	Second Time Round (1973)

Singles from Cymande
- 1. "The Message" Released: 1972; 2. "Bra" Released: 1972

Professional ratings
Review scores
Source	Rating
AllMusic	4/5 stars
Christgau's Record Guide	B+

Cymande (pronounced /sɪˈmɑːndeɪ/ sih-MAHN-day) is the debut album by British funk group Cymande. It was released in 1972 through Janus Records and produced entirely by John Schroeder. Recording sessions took place at De Lane Lea Studios in London.

The album peaked at No. 85 on the Billboard Top LPs and No. 24 on the Soul Albums in the United States. It spawned two singles, "The Message" and "Bra", both made it to the Soul Singles chart, reaching No. 22 and No. 51 respectively. Its lead single "The Message" also peaked at No. 48 on the Billboard Hot 100 singles chart.

== Track listing ==
Side one
No.	Title	Writer(s)	Length
1.	"Zion I"	Michael "Bami" Rose; Pablo Gonsales	3:29
2.	"One More"	Patrick Patterson; Steve Scipio	3:06
3.	"Getting It Back"	Patrick Patterson; Steve Scipio	4:16
4.	"Listen"	Patrick Patterson; Steve Scipio	4:37
5.	"Rickshaw"	Patrick Patterson; Steve Scipio	5:50

Side two
No.	Title	Writer(s)	Length
1.	"Dove"	Cymande	10:50
2.	"Bra"	Patrick Patterson; Steve Scipio	5:00
3.	"The Message"	Patrick Patterson; Steve Scipio	4:19
4.	"Ras Tafarian Folk Song"	Michael "Bami" Rose; Pablo Gonsales	3:08
Total length:			44:35

== Personnel ==
- Ray King – vocals, percussion
- Peter Serreo – tenor saxophone
- Michael "Bami" Rose – alto saxophone, flute, bongos
- Pablo Gonsales – congas
- Sam Kelly – drums
- Joey Dee – vocals, percussion
- Derek Gibbs – alto and soprano saxophone
- Steve Scipio – bass
- Patrick Eaton Patterson – guitar
- John Schroeder – producer, liner notes
- Mia Krinsky – coordinator

== Charts ==
Chart (1973)	Peak position
Canada Top Albums/CDs (RPM)	25
US Billboard 200	85
US Top R&B/Hip-Hop Albums (Billboard)	24

Chart (2023)	Peak position
Scottish Albums (Official Charts)	78
