= The Message (Cymande song) =

Song written by Patrick Patterson and Steve Scipio

Single by Cymande

from the album Cymande
- B-side: "Zion I"
- Released: 1972
- Studio: De Lane Lea Studios (London, England)
- Genre: Funk
- Length: 3:28
- Label: Janus Records; J 203
- Songwriter(s): Patrick Eaton Patterson; Steve Scipio
- Producer(s): John Schroeder

Cymande singles chronology
| "The Message" (1972) | "Bra" (1973) |

"The Message" is a song by British funk band Cymande from their self-titled debut studio album Cymande. Written by the group's members Patrick Patterson and Steve Scipio, it was recorded at De Lane Lea Studios in London, produced by John Schroeder, and released as a 7-inch single through Janus Records in 1972. Released as a lead single, the song peaked at No. 48 on the Billboard Hot 100 and No. 22 on the Hot R&B/Hip-Hop Songs in the United States.

The song can be heard in Spike Lee's 2002 film 25th Hour and Seth Gordon's 2011 film Horrible Bosses. British reggae group Aswad recorded a cover version of the song for their 1988 studio album Distant Thunder.

A cover of the song was performed by jazz-funk trumpeter Blue Mitchell, and released on his 1973 album, The Last Tango = Blues.

== Track listing ==
The Message 7-inch
| No. | Title | Writer(s) | Producer(s) | Length |
|---|---|---|---|---|
| 1. | "The Message" | Patrick Patterson; Steve Scipio | John Schroeder | 3:28 |
| 2. | "Zion I" | Mike Rose; Pablo Gonzales | John Schroeder | 3:29 |

== Personnel ==
- Ray King – vocals, percussion
- Peter Serreo – tenor saxophone
- Michael "Bami" Rose – alto saxophone, flute, bongos
- Pablo Gonsales – Congas
- Sam Kelly – drums
- Joey Dee – vocals, percussion
- Derek Gibbs – alto and soprano saxophone
- Steve Scipio – bass, songwriter
- Patrick Eaton Patterson – guitar, songwriter
- John Schroeder – producer

== Charts ==
| Chart (1973) | Peak position |
|---|---|
| US Billboard Hot 100 | 48 |
| US Hot R&B/Hip-Hop Songs (Billboard) | 22 |

== Sampled credits ==
The song was sampled by several hip hop recording artists, including:

- Ruthless Rap Assassins in "And It Wasn't a Dream" from Killer Album (1990)
- Masta Ace in "Me and the Biz" from Take a Look Around (1990)
- MC Solaar in "Bouge de là" from Qui sème le vent récolte le tempo (1991)
- King Tee in "On tha Rox" from Tha Triflin' Album (1993)
- GRITS in "Fragmentation" from Factors of the Seven (1998)
