= Levee Blues =

Studio album by Potliquor
- Released: December 1971
- Recorded: February–August 1971
- Studio: Deep South Recording Studio
- Genres: Southern rock; blues rock
- Length: 34:53
- Label: Janus
- Producer: Jim Brown

Potliquor chronology
First Taste (1970)	Levee Blues (1971)	Louisiana Rock & Roll (1972)

Levee Blues is the second album from American band Potliquor released in 1971.

Work on Levee Blues began in February 1971 at Deep South Recording Studio, and even though it had been planned for release in May, the band did not complete recording until August 1971 with the album release coming in December.

== Reception ==
Chess/Janus announced that they would be promoting the new album for Christmas sales, and the company took out a full page ad in Billboard in December to promote five of its new albums, including Levee Blues.

A good review in Billboard foreshadowed a successful run by Levee Blues. Billboard reported airplay in Kalamazoo, Michigan; Chico, California; De Kalb, Illinois; Long Beach, California; and Bridgeport, Connecticut in the first two months of 1972, and the album hit the Billboard chart at #208 at the end of January. "Cheer", a cut from the album was released quickly because of the early airplay it had been getting from national disc jockeys and entered the Billboard Hot 100 at #98 on February 12, 1972. Five weeks later, a constant increase in sales lifted Levee Blues to #168 and "Cheer" to #65. This would be the high water mark for both the album and single. The album was reported as still getting airplay in Livonia, Michigan at the end of the year.

== Track listing ==
No.	Title	Writer(s)	Length
1.	"Cheer"	George Ratzlaff	4:52
2.	"The Train"	George Ratzlaff	3:28
3.	"Levee Blues"	Les Wallace, George Ratzlaff	4:03
4.	"Rooster Blues"	Willie Dixon	6:34
5.	"Chattanooga"	George Ratzlaff	3:06
6.	"Lady Madonna"	John Lennon, Paul McCartney	3:59
7.	"You're No Good"	Clint Ballard Jr.	3:59
8.	"When God Dips His Love in My Heart"	W. S. Stevenson	0:57
9.	"Beyond the River Jordan"	George Ratzlaff	3:55

== Personnel ==
- Jerry Amoroso – drums, percussion, vocals
- George Ratzlaff – piano, pipe organ, organ, guitar, vocals
- Guy Schaeffer – bass guitar on all tracks except as noted below, vocals
- Les Wallace – guitars, vocals
- Leon Medica – bass guitar on "Cheer" and "Beyond the River Jordan"
- Quote from Leon Medica in regard to "Cheer": "George Ratzlaff wrote the song, played keyboards and was the lead vocalist on "Cheer", Jerry Amoroso (drums), Les Wallace (guitar), and I was a studio session played and played bass on that track. Guy Schaefer was a really good live bassist, but had problems with his tone when recording in the studio."

Additional musicians

- Paul Harrison – 12-string guitar
- Bobby Thomas – percussion
- Glen Spreen – horn arrangements
- Horns – Lee Fortier
- Art DeCesare – horns
- Bud Brashier – horns
- Lloyd Roach – horns
- Pete Verbois – horns
- Jimmy Miller – horns
- Charles Pounds – horns
- Cy Frost – string arrangements
- Dino Constantinides – strings
- Leslie Petrere – strings
- Kenneth Klaus – strings
- Clarence Render – strings
- Thaddeus Brys – strings
- John Babb – strings
- Studio Chicks (a.k.a. "The Blackeyed Peas") – background vocals

Production

- Jim Brown – producer
- Cy Frost – production assistant, engineer
- Design and Graphics – Martin McCoy III – design and graphics
- B.A. – photography
- Neil Traylor – assistance with remote recording
- Mia Krinsky – album coordinator
- Bob Scerbo – production supervisor
- Pipe organ courtesy of the Paramount Theater (Baton Rouge), Tom Mitchell, and Donald May
