= Louisiana Rock & Roll =

Studio album by Potliquor
- Released: January 1973
- Studio: Deep South Recording Studio
- Genre: Southern rock; blues rock
- Length: 39:36
- Label: Janus
- Producer: Jim Brown

Potliquor chronology
Levee Blues (1971)	Louisiana Rock & Roll (1973)	Potliquor (1979)

Louisiana Rock & Roll is the third album by American southern rock band Potliquor. It was released in 1973.

At least one newspaper had begun reporting Louisiana Rock & Roll's release at the end of January, and by early February 1973, Janus Records had placed a full color ad across the bottom of the front page of Billboard Magazine promoting new albums by three of their artists, including Louisiana Rock & Roll. A week later, a full page advertisement appeared in Billboard concerning new albums by eleven Chess/Janus artists, among them being Potliquor's new LP,. In fact, an early release of "Waiting for Me at the River", a single from the album, had been reported as a regional breakout in New Orleans in October of the previous year. By the end of March, Billboard was reporting considerable airplay for Louisiana Rock & Roll in Valdosta, Georgia; Los Angeles, California; Hartford, Connecticut; St. Charles, Missouri; Paris, Texas; Denver, Colorado; and Toronto, Canada. "H", another single from the album, was reported being played in Lewisburg, Pennsylvania in the middle of March 1973.

== Track listing ==
No.	Title	Writer(s)	Length
1.	"You Can't Get There from Here"	Casey Kelly	3:15
2.	"Waitin' for Me at the River"	George Ratzlaff	3:44
3.	"Taj and Jimmy's Blues"	Taj Mahal, Al Smith, Jimmy Reed	5:41
4.	"Rip It Up"	Marascalco Blackwell	2:32
5.	"H"	Les Wallace, Lauretta Wallace	4:50
6.	"Louisiana Rock 'n' Roll"	George Ratzlaff	3:21
7.	"St. Jude's Blues"	Jerry Amoroso	3:00
8.	"Born Under a Bad Sign"	Booker T. Jones, William Bell	5:21
9.	"Guitar Boogie"	George Ratzlaff	3:35
10.	"For You"	Les Wallace	4:37

== Personnel ==
- Jerry Amoroso – drums, vocals, percussion
- George Ratzlaff – keyboards, vocals
- Guy Schaeffer – bass guitar, vocals
- Les Wallace – guitars, vocals
- Leon Medica – bass guitar, vocals

Additional musicians

- Cy Frost – horn arrangement on “Rip It Up,” string arrangement and piano on intro to "For You," clavinet and Moog synthesizer on "H”
- Glenn Spreen – horn and string arrangements except for "Rip It Up"
- Uncle Buck Wood – fiddle on "You Can't Get There From Here"
- Gail and David Amoroso – handclaps on "Waiting for Me"
- Lee Fortier – horns
- Art DeCesare – horns
- Bud Brasher – horns
- Pete Verbois – horns
- Bill Ludwig – horns
- Nick Rousse – horns
- Charlie Depuy – horns
- Strings on "For You" – a combined section of the New Orleans Symphony and Baton Rouge Symphony

Production

- Jim Brown – producer
- Cy Frost – production consultant, recording engineer
- Peter Granet – remix engineer
- F. Alessandrini – artwork
- J. W. deBuys – photography
- Dawn Studios (New Orleans) – album cover design
- Mia Krinsky – album coordination
- Bob Scerbo – production coordinator
