= New Orleans Pop Festival =

- New Orleans Pop Festival poster
- Genre: Rock, pop
- Dates: August 30 – September 1, 1969
- Locations: Prairieville, Louisiana; United States
- Years active: 1969
- Founders: Steve Kapelow
- Attendance: 25,000–30,000

The New Orleans Pop Festival was a rock festival held on Labor Day weekend (August 30 – September 1, 1969), two weeks after the Woodstock Festival. It was held at the Pelican International Speedway in Prairieville, Louisiana, about 65 miles up the Mississippi River from New Orleans and 15 miles south of Baton Rouge. Over 26 bands performed during the three days of the festival, including seven veterans of Woodstock. It had a peak attendance of 25,000–30,000 people.

== Background ==
The summer of 1969 saw a proliferation of the relatively new concert genre of pop/rock festivals. While the cultural highlight was undoubtedly the Woodstock Music and Art Fair on August 15–18, 1969, near White Lake, New York, the New Orleans Pop Festival was among several major pop festivals held that year in the deep South. Unlike several other pop festivals around the country, the local citizenry and governmental bodies were tolerant though wary of such a large crowd. The experiences of other festival promoters having to fight local government ordinances and prohibitions was not shared by promoter Steve Kapelow and his sponsoring company, Kesi, Inc, with the result that concert preparations were complete upon commencement of the festival.

The fall of 1969 saw the beginning of court-ordered integration of area schools, and racial tensions were high. Because of several incidents of violence resulting from racial incidents, local towns were under a tight night curfew, although that curfew did not extend to the concert site.

== Preparation ==
Promoter Steve Kapelow, 27 at the time and a fellow musician, described the preparations for the festival by telling a UPI reporter, "We expect 15,000–20,000 in light of advance ticket sales, but we have prepared for double that." Kapelow explained that their extra preparations were costing more money than was likely necessary, "but we'd rather do that than have the industry suffer another disaster," referring to Woodstock where attendance was vastly greater than anticipated, and preparations were inadequate. Kapelow pointed out that he was confident in his attendance projections because the Louisiana population base was much smaller than that of the New York area, that there was another pop festival in the Dallas area on the same weekend that would compete for attendees, and that destruction from Hurricane Camille, which made its U.S. landfall on July 18 in the Biloxi/Gulfport, Mississippi area would likely reduce attendance from the Gulf Coast.

The stage was built in the straightaway of the race track on the opposite side of the infield to the grandstand, with capacities of 60,000 and 11,000 respectively. The stage itself was double wide, with two separate light and sound systems, making a large jam session with several groups possible and greatly reducing the intermission between performers.

Kapelow and fellow promoter Joe Kaplan attended several previous pop festivals to get an idea of what sort of preparations were necessary, and that work resulted in what was reported as "an abundance of food and drink and other supplies." Hundreds of portable toilets and 50-gallon drums of water were scattered around the race track, and limited showers were available to festival goers.

The festival was originally planned for two days, but a free Saturday evening show was added. Sunday tickets went for $7.00 for advance tickets and $9.50 at the gate, while Monday prices were $8.00 in advance and $10.50 at the gate. Tickets for the entire festival cost $13.00 in advance and $16.00 at the gate (an estimated $83.00 and $102.00, respectively, in 2015 dollars).

== Concert crowd ==
Uniformed law enforcement restricted themselves to traffic control in the access roads. Although there were 116+ undercover narcotic officers, drug use was such that only 37 drug arrests were made, with the focus being the sellers rather than the users. Promoters had arranged for several motorcycle clubs to handle internal security, and apparently did a good job. Local Sheriff H. M. Waguespack praised the behavior of the crowd, saying that things were going much better than he had expected. Local towns were under a tight night curfew due to violence resulting from racial incidents because of the recent court-ordered integration of area schools, but the sheriff's office declined to extend the curfew to the festival site. A medical team hired by the promoters handled a few cases of drug overdoses, but most cases were related to insect bites and cuts incurred by walking on broken glass.

Peak attendance occurred on Sunday; law enforcement estimated 20,000–25,000 and the promoters' estimate was 30,000–35,000.

== Schedule ==
The schedule of the festival is known with relative certainty. The concert poster contained the complete lineup and time of appearance. Newspaper articles a day or two prior to the concert repeated the highlights of the poster's schedule with a few changes. Newspaper reports after the performances confirm that all bands on Sunday which were scheduled played ("although the time slots for them were juggled considerably") and confirm most of Monday's lineup with a few order changes. Without any media reports to the contrary, it is assumed that Saturday's schedule took place as planned.

Lesser known bands were scheduled to play an hour apart, better known bands were given an hour and 15 minutes, and Jefferson Airplane was booked for a two-hour concert. The demands of the crowd for encores quickly put the festival off schedule, pushing performance times later and later as the day wore on, although the double stage did allow a band to get on stage before the preceding band was finished, drastically reducing the intermission between bands.

Saturday, August 30, 1969

1. Local bands starting playing at 6:00pm until the "official" free concert began at 8:00pm.
2. White Fox
3. Snow Rabbit
4. Deacon John and the Electric Soul Train
5. Whizbang
6. Axis
7. Tyrannosaurus Rex
8. It's a Beautiful Day

Sunday, August 31, 1969

1. Flower Power
2. Snow Rabbit
3. Spiral Starecase
4. Oliver
5. Smyth
6. The Youngbloods
7. It's a Beautiful Day
8. Country Joe and the Fish
9. The Byrds
10. Canned Heat - A fireworks display was scheduled after this act.
11. Iron Butterfly
12. Janis Joplin
13. Santana

Sweetwater and White Clover were supposed to play, but their performances were canceled due to the late hour; the scheduled jam session was probably also canceled.

Doug Kershaw from Louisiana played as well but is not mentioned here. He had a big hit: Louisiana Man.

Monday, September 1, 1969

While it is likely that Sweetwater and White Clover were moved to Monday's lineup, there was no mention of it in local media reports. (At the very least, Sweetwater's status as a Woodstock band makes it unlikely that they were not given another performance slot.)

1. Potliquor - A flower drop was supposed to take place during the Potliquor performance, but the plane missed its target and dropped the flowers onto nearby fields instead of on the crowd; additionally, the flowers fell in globs instead of "floating gently down among the flower children."
2. Axis
3. Oliver
4. Cat Mother and the All Night Newsboys
5. Santana
6. Chicago (Transit Authority) - Several newspaper articles referred to this group as Chicago Transit Authority. The concert poster listed them as it is listed here, with Transit Authority in parentheses. This would suggest that the band had already changed its name but were still commonly known as CTA.
7. It's a Beautiful Day
8. Tyrannosaurus Rex
9. The Youngbloods
10. Lee Michaels
11. Grateful Dead
12. Jefferson Airplane
13. Dr. John VooDoo Show
14. Giant Jam Session featuring Jefferson Airplane, Grateful Dead, Cat Mother, Santana, Chicago, Beautiful Day
15. Whizbang

Glen McKay and his crew, known as the Headlights, nationally known for their concert light shows, presented a light show Sunday and Monday nights.

Several newspapers mentioned that Clearwater Revival (presumably Creedence Clearwater Revival) played, but that is almost certainly incorrect.

== Other Labor Day festivals of 1969 ==
The New Orleans Pop Festival was not the only festival of significance on the Labor Day weekend of 1969. Three were held on that weekend in the U.S. and one in Great Britain:

- Sky River Rock Festival (August 30 – September 1, 1969), held in Tenino, Washington
- Texas International Pop Festival (August 30 – September 1, 1969), held at the newly opened Dallas International Motor Speedway in Lewisville, Texas
- Isle of Wight Festival (August 29–31, 1969), held at Wootton, England on the Isle of Wight

== The music ==
According to reports from the New Orleans Times-Picayune, the first of the Sunday performances were "largely disappointing", with the performance by Oliver described as "particularly inept". However, the "Youngbloods awakened a lethargic crowd... with a solid performance." It's a Beautiful Day was called "one of the outstanding acts of the entire festival" and received calls for the first encore of the day. Country Joe and the Fish were said to be "moving", while the Byrds gave a professional performance but "their music lacked the emotion of the other groups". Canned Heat, who followed The Byrds, was described as "the hit of the night", bringing the spectators to their feet, and yet perhaps topped by Iron Butterfly who "definitely provided the highlight of the night's entertainment". Janis Joplin followed "with obvious emotion" and yet her performance was "anti-climactic after Canned Heat and Iron Butterfly". On Monday, It's a Beautiful Day gave "another fine performance".

== Groups of note ==
Several groups which appeared at the New Orleans Pop Festival also appeared at the two other major U.S. pop festivals being held on the same holiday weekend. Those groups were:

- Also performing at the Sky River Rock Festival:
1. Country Joe and the Fish
2. The Youngbloods
- Also performing at the Texas International Pop Festival:
1. Canned Heat
2. Chicago Transit Authority
3. Janis Joplin
4. Santana
5. Sweetwater

Seven groups also appeared at Woodstock, two weeks previous, on August 15–18, 1969:

1. Sweetwater
2. Janis Joplin
3. Santana
4. Jefferson Airplane
5. Grateful Dead
6. Country Joe and the Fish
7. Canned Heat

While most groups were already nationally known, at least one group was able to parlay its performance at the New Orleans Pop Festival into a record contract. The local group, Potliquor, caught the eyes of several record labels, eventually signing a record contract with Janus Records.

== See also ==
- List of historic rock festivals
