= The First Taste =

(The) First Taste may refer to

- "The First Taste" (True Blood), a television episode
- "The First Taste", a song by Fiona Apple from Tidal
- First Taste (Potliquor album), 1970
- First Taste (Ty Segall album), 2019
