= Ginny Arnell =

American singer (born 1942)

- Born: Virginia Mazarro; November 2, 1942 (age 83); New Haven, Connecticut, U.S.
- Genres: Pop, country music
- Occupations: Singer, songwriter
- Years active: 1959–1965
- Labels: Decca, Warwick, MGM

Virginia Mazarro (born November 2, 1942), known professionally as Ginny Arnell, is an American retired pop and country music singer and songwriter who recorded in the late 1950s and early 1960s.

== Life ==
Born in New Haven, Connecticut, she attended East Haven High School and began making local television appearances as a child. While still at school she won a national competition as "most talented teenager" in the US, following which she made many appearances in TV and radio broadcasts. At the suggestion of manager Martin Kugell she was paired with another local teenager, Gene Pitney, and they recorded for Decca Records in New York City in 1959 as a duo, Jamie & Jane. Two singles were released by the pair, "Snuggle Up Baby", and "Faithful Our Love" (co-written by Pitney and Mazarro), but neither achieved chart success. Both she and Pitney then became solo acts, and she released three singles for Decca as Ginny Arnell – "Mister Saxophone" (written by Neil Sedaka and Howard Greenfield), "Carnival", and "Look Who's Talkin'" – but again without success. "Look Who's Talkin'" was written by Gerry Goffin and Carole King, and its B-side, "Tell Me What He Said", written by Jeff Barry, was recorded by British singer Helen Shapiro in 1962 and became a #2 hit on the UK singles chart.

In 1961 Arnell moved to Warwick Records, releasing two singles, "Tribute To You" and "He Likes Rock And Roll Better Than Me". Again, neither charted. However, she had more success after moving to the MGM label in 1963. Her first single for the label, "Dumb Head", written by David Hess and Camille Monte, produced by Jim Vienneau, and described at AllMusic as "pathetically self-deprecating", reached number 3 on WLS and number 50 on the Billboard Hot 100. She appeared on American Bandstand to promote the record, and also recorded the song in Japanese.

Following its relative success, she recorded at Owen Bradley's studio in Nashville with Vienneau and arrangers including Ray Stevens. She released several more singles in 1964 and 1965, including "He's My Little Devil", "Just Like A Boy" (written and produced by Chip Taylor), and "A Little Bit Of Love Can Hurt" (co-written, arranged and produced by Teddy Randazzo). The B-side of "He's My Little Devil" was "I Wish I Knew What Dress To Wear", written by Gloria Shayne and Noël Regney. It is described by Bruce Eder at Allmusic as "a classic of the [girl group] genre for poignancy....Arnell's singing projected extraordinary depth of feeling, similar to Lesley Gore, and turned the seemingly superficial song into a moving mini-drama."

The MGM label also released an LP of her recordings, Meet Ginny Arnell. According to reviewer Jason Ankeny, the album "documents with soap opera accuracy the trials and travails of teenage life, when every romantic slight is the stuff of Shakespearian drama and every blemish a terminal disease: hits like "Dumb Head" and "I Wish I Knew What Dress to Wear" document the kinds of existential crises that can only occur when you're young, hormonal, and too goddamn stupid to know what real problems are about." The album was reissued with additional tracks on CD in 2008.

Arnell retired from the music business in 1965 to marry and raise a family, only re-emerging to give short interviews in 2008 and 2010.

== Discography ==
=== Singles ===
==== Jamie & Jane ====
- "Snuggle Up Baby" / "Strolling" (Decca, 1959)
- "Faithful Our Love" / "Classical Rock and Roll" (Decca, 1959)

==== Ginny Arnell ====
- "Mister Saxophone" / "Brand New" (Decca, 1960)
- "Carnival (Manha de Carnaval)" / "We" (Decca, 1960)
- "Look Who's Talkin'" / "Tell Me What He Said" (Decca, 1960)
- "Tribute to You" / "No-One Cares" (Warwick, 1961)
- "He Likes Rock & Roll Better than Me" / "Married to You" (Warwick, 1962)
- "Trouble's Back in Town" / "I'm Crying Too" (MGM, 1963)
- "Dumb Head" / "How Many Times Can One Heart Break?" (MGM, 1963)
- "Watch What You Do with My Baby" / "You Pulled a Fast One" (MGM, 1963)
- "He's My Little Devil" / "I Wish I Knew What Dress to Wear" (MGM, 1964)
- "Let Me Make You Smile Again" / "Yesterday's Memories" (MGM, 1964)
- "Just Like a Boy" / "Portrait of a Fool" (MGM, 1965)
- "A Little Bit of Love Can Hurt" / "B-I-L-L-WHY" (MGM, 1965)
- "I'm Gettin' Mad" / "I'm So Afraid of Loving You" (MGM, 1965)

=== Albums ===
- Meet Ginny Arnell (MGM, 1964)
  - Meet Ginny Arnell (Poker CD, 2008)
