= Mike Hawker (songwriter) =

English songwriter

- Born: 29 November 1936; Bath, Somerset, England
- Died: 4 May 2014 (aged 77)
- Occupations: Songwriter; critic; publicist; promoter

Michael Edwin Hawker (29 November 1936 – 4 May 2014) was an English songwriter.

== Biography ==
Born in Bath, Somerset, Hawker lived as a child in Singapore, where his father was stationed in the Royal Air Force, before returning to settle with relatives in Barnsley, Yorkshire. After attending university, he spent time with the RAF in Europe, and started writing concert reviews of American jazz musicians, which he submitted to such magazines as the New Musical Express and Jazz Journal. He started working in the publicity department at EMI in the late 1950s, and then moved into promotion work with Larry Parnes.

He started writing songs circa 1960, and linked up with composer John Schroeder to write lyrics for producer Norrie Paramor's young protégée Helen Shapiro. Hawker wrote the lyrics for several songs recorded by Shapiro, including "Don't Treat Me Like a Child", "You Don't Know", and "Walkin' Back to Happiness", for which he won an Ivor Novello award. He also co-wrote "I Only Want to Be with You" recorded by Dusty Springfield.

Hawker married Jean Ryder of the Vernons Girls. He continued to write for many of the most successful girl singers of the early 1960s including Dusty Springfield, Susan Maughan and Jackie Trent with diminishing commercial success. In 1973, he co-wrote Cliff Richard's hit single "Help It Along", with Brian Bennett of the Shadows. He continued working in the London music business; among other successes discovering singer-songwriter Labi Siffre.

He died in 2014, after protracted poor health.
