= You Don't Know (Helen Shapiro song) =

Single by Helen Shapiro
- B-side: "Marvellous Lie"
- Released: 29 June 1961 (UK)
- Recorded: 1961
- Genre: Pop
- Label: Columbia (EMI) DB 4670 (UK)
- Songwriters: John Schroeder, Mike Hawker
- Producer: Norrie Paramor

Helen Shapiro singles chronology
"Don't Treat Me Like a Child" (1961)	"You Don't Know" (1961)	"Walkin' Back to Happiness" (1961)

"You Don't Know" is a 1961 single by Helen Shapiro. It was written by John Schroeder and Mike Hawker and released on the Columbia (EMI) label in the United Kingdom on 29 June 1961. "You Don't Know" topped the UK Singles Chart for three weeks beginning on 10 August. The single sold over a million copies and earned Shapiro a gold disc.

== International chart positions ==
Chart (1961/1962)	Peak position
UK Singles Chart	1
Irish Singles Chart	1
New Zealand Singles Chart	1
Norway Singles Chart	2
Israel Singles Chart	3
Danish Singles Chart	3
Japanese Singles Chart	4
Ultratop (Flanders)	4
Ultratop (Wallonia)	5
French Singles Chart	6
Dutch Muziek Express Top 30	15

== Cover versions ==
- In Japan, where Shapiro's version also became popular in 1962, the song was covered in Japanese by Mieko Hirota, who had also covered Shapiro's earlier hit "Don't Treat Me Like a Child."
