= Crooklyn Dodgers =

American hip hop group

- Origin: New York City, U.S.
- Genres: Hip-hop
- Years active: 1994–1995; 2007
- Labels: 40 Acres and a Mule; MCA
- Past members: Buckshot; Chubb Rock; Jean Grae; Jeru the Damaja; Masta Ace; Memphis Bleek; Mos Def; O.C. Special Ed

The Crooklyn Dodgers were an American hip-hop supergroup based in Brooklyn, New York, consisting of rotating members.

They appeared in three separate incarnations in 1994, 1995, and 2007. The first two incarnations recorded for the soundtracks for Spike Lee films, Crooklyn and Clockers, respectively. The theme connecting the songs, aside from the Spike Lee films for which they were made, is their topical concerns, which comment on the state of affairs in and around urban New York, as well as other issues affecting everyday life.

== Discography ==
=== Singles ===
- "Crooklyn" (1994), MCA
- "Return of the Crooklyn Dodgers" (1995), 40 Acres and a Mule/MCA

== Versions ==
=== Crooklyn Dodgers ===
The first group was composed of Buckshot, Masta Ace and Special Ed. Their first and only record was "Crooklyn", produced by Q-Tip of A Tribe Called Quest, and was featured in the 1994 film Crooklyn. The music video featured appearances by Brooklyn-born athletes Michael Jordan and Mike Tyson.

=== Crooklyn Dodgers '95 ===
The second group was composed of Chubb Rock, Jeru the Damaja and O.C. Their first and only record was "Return of the Crooklyn Dodgers", produced by DJ Premier, and was featured in the 1995 film Clockers.

=== Crooklyn Dodgers III ===
The third group consisted of Jean Grae, Mos Def and Memphis Bleek. North Carolina producer 9th Wonder resurrected the group concept in 2007 for a track on his album The Dream Merchant Vol. 2, titled "Brooklyn in My Mind".
