= Don't Treat Me Like a Child =

Single by Helen Shapiro
- B-side: "When I'm with You"
- Released: 10 February 1961 (UK)
- Recorded: 1961
- Genre: Pop
- Label: Columbia (EMI)
- Songwriters: John Schroeder, Mike Hawker

Helen Shapiro singles chronology
"Don't Treat Me Like a Child" (1961)	"You Don't Know" (1961)

"Don't Treat Me Like a Child" is the debut single of then fourteen-year-old Helen Shapiro, released in February 1961. It was written by John Schroeder and Mike Hawker. The song was recorded at Abbey Road, with a nine-piece band under the direction of Martin Slavin.

After Shapiro's appearance on the ITV musical programme Thank Your Lucky Stars, the record took off and reached a peak position of No. 3 on the UK charts, as well as being relatively well received in the rest of Europe.

== Chart performance ==
Chart (1961)	Peak position
UK Singles Chart	3
New Zealand Singles Chart	1
Irish Singles Chart	6
