= Potliquor (album) =

Studio album by Potliquor
- Released: 1979
- Studio: Studio in the Country, Washington Parish, Louisiana
- Genre: Southern rock; blues rock
- Length: 36:53
- Label: Capitol
- Producer: Bill Evans

Potliquor chronology
Louisiana Rock & Roll (1973)	Potliquor (1979)	The Best of Potliquor (2008)

Potliquor is the fourth album by American band Potliquor. It was released in 1979 and was their first album since 1973.

With no music released and/or seeing radio play since 1973, things were not looking very positive for the new lineup of Potliquor, now a three-man group composed of drummer Jerry Amoroso, bassist Guy Schaeffer, and guitarist Mike McQuaig. Amoroso flew to New York City to attempt to get a second chance at a recording contract, but to no avail. His disappointment led to the writing of "New York City You Ain't". Armed with a new song, Amoroso successfully negotiated a record deal with Capricorn Records early in 1977. With this new record label support, Potliquor released the song as a single in March 1977, but the lack of substantive airplay and sales scuttled plans for a new album.

It wasn't until 1979 when, free of their Capricorn Records contract, Potliquor went into Studio in the Country to record their fourth album, Potliquor. It had moderate success.

In a national feature "Pop Scene – Here's the Answer" provided by the United Feature Syndicate based in New York, New York, a newspaper reader from Santa Monica, California wrote in to inquire about Potliquor, having heard "Louisiana Lady", a single from the Potliquor album. The feature responded that "Capitol is giving the group new life, and is promoting them as if they were recently formed."

== Track listing ==
No.	Title	Writer(s)	Length
1.	"Right Street / Wrong Direction"	Jerry Amoroso; Steve Sather	4:04
2.	"Red Stick"	Amoroso	3:47
3.	"Misery"	Amoroso	3:01
4.	"Mr. President"	Randy Newman	2:17
5.	"Hey Mama"	Amoroso	4:39
6.	"Boy Oh Boy"	Amoroso	3:43
7.	"Life Should Be a Laugh"	Amoroso	3:54
8.	"Liar"	Amoroso; David Craig	2:30
9.	"Louisiana Lady"	Harry Vanda; George Young	3:38
10.	"Oh So Long"	Amoroso	4:20

== Personnel ==
- Jerry Amoroso – drums, vocals, percussion
- Mike McQuaig – guitar
- Steve Sather – guitar, Vocals
- Guy Schaeffer – bass guitar, vocals

Additional musicians

- Rod Roddy (courtesy of Louisiana's LeRoux) – piano, clavinet, Oberheim synthesizer
- John Smith – saxophone solo on "Misery"
- Yolanda Nichols – background vocals on "Right Street / Wrong Direction" and "Misery"
- Charles Brent – string Arrangement on "Oh So Long"
- Charles Brent and John Smith – horn arrangements on "Misery", "Hey Mama", "Boy Oh Boy", "Liar"
- Jerry Amoroso and John Smith – horn arrangements on "Mr. President"
- String Quartet – Valerie Poullette, Michael Gyurik, Allen Nisbet, Jim Ummel
- Horn Section – Jon Smith, Charles Brent, Brian O'Neil, John Brem, Joe Woolie, Wade Smith

Production

- Bill Evans – producer, engineer
- Jerry Amoroso – co-producer
