= Piano Vibrations =

Studio album by Rick Wakeman
- Released: 1971
- Recorded: Pye, London
- Genres: Pop, folk rock, jazz
- Length: 32:45
- Label: Polydor
- Producer: John Schroeder

Rick Wakeman chronology
Piano Vibrations (1971)	The Six Wives of Henry VIII (1973)

Piano Vibrations is the debut studio album by English keyboardist Rick Wakeman, released in 1971 by Polydor Records.

== Overview ==
Piano Vibrations was recorded when Wakeman was a session musician and a member of the folk rock group the Strawbs. The album features covers of pop, jazz, and folk songs with Wakeman on piano, John Schroeder and his orchestra, and a singer called Chris. Wakeman was paid a total of £36 for the four sessions it took to record the album. His name, and that of the lead vocalist, are not even written on the cover.

== Track listing ==
Side one
No.	Title	Writer(s)	Length
1.	"Take Me to the Pilot"	Elton John, Bernie Taupin	3:00
2.	"Yellow Man"	Randy Newman	2:36
3.	"Cast Your Fate to the Wind"	Vince Guaraldi, Carel Weber	2:35
4.	"Gloria, Gloria"	John Schroeder, Anthony King	3:08
5.	"Your Song"	Elton John, Bernie Taupin	3:45

Side two
No.	Title	Writer(s)	Length
6.	"Delta Lady"	Leon Russell	3:26
7.	"A Picture Of You"	John Schroeder, Anthony King	2:59
8.	"Home Sweet Oklahoma"	Leon Russell	3:22
9.	"Fire and Rain"	James Taylor	3:25
10.	"Classical Gas"	Mason Williams	2:56

== Personnel ==
- Rick Wakeman – grand piano
- John Schroeder orchestra
- Chris – vocals
