= First Taste (Potliquor album) =

Studio album by Potliquor
- Released: November 1970
- Studio: Deep South Recording Studio
- Genre: Southern rock; blues rock
- Length: 39:18
- Label: Janus
- Producer: Jim Brown

Potliquor chronology
First Taste (1970)	Levee Blues (1971)

First Taste is the debut album by American band Potliquor released in November 1970.

While First Taste never quite broke onto the Billboard album chart, the magazine did report in mid-October/early November 1970 that "Riverboat", a single from the album was being played at the University of Wisconsin radio station and at Queens College in Queens, New York and again in early November that the album was receiving airplay by radio stations run by Southern Methodist University and the University of Minnesota. They also posted a notice later in the month that the GRT Corporation, the corporate owner of Janus Records, was generating "much excitement behind its debut album by Potliquor, First Taste" in Toronto, Ontario, Canada.

== Track listing ==
No.	Title	Writer(s)	Length
1.	"Down the River Boogie"	George Ratzlaff	2:49
2.	"Ol' Man River"	Jerome Kern, Oscar Hammerstein II	4:37
3.	"Riverboat"	David Craig	3:08
4.	"Toballby"	George Ratzlaff, Les Wallace, Guy Schaeffer, Jerry Amoroso	7:21
5.	"The Raven"	George Ratzlaff, Edgar Allan Poe	5:05
6.	"You're No Good"	Clint Ballard Jr.	4:55
7.	"Price 20 Cents a Copy"	George Ratzlaff	3:08
8.	"Driftin'"	Giuseppe Efronetée	8:15

== Personnel ==
- Jerry Amoroso – drums, percussion, vocals
- George Ratzlaff – keyboards, rhythm guitar, harp, percussion, vocals
- Guy Schaeffer – bass guitar, vocals
- Les Wallace – guitars, vocals

Additional

- Jim Brown – producer
- Cy Frost – engineer
- Sam Forbes – photography
- The Graffiteria – album cover design
- Dorothy Schwartz – album coordinator
- Ron Scerbo – production coordinator
- Artistic Promotional Enterprises – management
- Great South Artists – direction
