= Innovative Life: The Anthology, 1984–1989 =

Innovative Life: The Anthology 1984–1989

Compilation album by Arabian Prince
- Released: August 19, 2008
- Genre: Electro
- Length: 61:35
- Label: Stones Throw
- Producers: The Arabian Prince; Courtney Branch; Tracy Kendrick; Kendrick "Buckwheat" Neal

Arabian Prince chronology
Where's My Bytches (1993)	Innovative Life: The Anthology 1984–1989 (2008)

Innovative Life: The Anthology 1984–1989 (often called Innovative Life: The Anthology) is a compilation album released in 2008 by American recording artist Arabian Prince and his fifth album overall, off of Stones Throw Records. Innovative Life collects a handful of Arabian Prince productions originally released in the 12" format on the labels Rapsur, Street Kut, and Techno Kut, along with some cuts with N.W.A.

== Critical reception ==
Professional ratings
Review scores
Source	Rating
AllMusic	4/5 stars
PopMatters	6/10

Innovative Life received positive reviews, but had criticism toward its songwriting and flow. Andrew Martin of PopMatters wrote "Arabian Prince isn't too impressive in the booth."" Andy Kellman of AllMusic stated that the first track "Strange Life" is a "limp curiosity, recorded with musicians who knew much more about Poco than P-Funk." The reviews highlighted him as a pioneer of electro-hop; Martin wrote "he was a trendsetter in the world of electro-hop", while Steve Juon of RapReviews stated "His life reflects the ambition and innovation of the early West Coast hip-hop scene."

On the songs of the album, Martin claimed "Arabian Prince does a fine job of commanding your attention". He commented on the song "Strange Life", "with its syrupy synths and simplistic beat, perfectly captures the feel of ‘80s electro". On "Take You Home Girl", Martin wrote "Even though the track shows its age in spades, it could warrant some spins at a party where everyone has a slight buzz and... wants to dance." He then criticized Innovative Life for not having variety, remarking "While the cohesion is appreciated, it can grow tiring." He however showed distinct praise for the last two tracks "Simple Planet and Beatdabeat", asserting that "Both of them sound like they crawled out of an '80s action film where you spent more of your time listening to the music than watching the flick."

Though the album received criticism for its the writing and flow, Steve Juon of RapReviews noted that the album "not only compels the listener through sound, but through prose." Overall, the reviews of the album were positive as Martin stated, "If you can get past those inefficiencies, however, what you are left with is a strong showing of an unfortunately overlooked era in hip-hop." Steve Juon wrote similar comments: "Through Arabian Prince's music and life story, Stones Throw Records is proud to present a glimpse into an overlooked chapter in hip-hop's history." Kellman ended his review, stating "All the ingredients of classic electro are present... the bounding machine beats, synthesizers set to either "paranoid" or "assault," cyborg vocals."

== Track listing ==
1. "Strange Life" – 6:54
2. "It Ain't Tough" – 6:10
3. "Take You Home Girl" – 8:17
4. "Let's Hit the Beach" (feat. The Sheiks) – 5:25
5. "Innovative Life" (feat. The Sheiks) – 5:55
6. "Innovator" (feat. The Sheiks) – 4:53
7. "Situation Hot" (feat. The Sheiks) – 4:38
8. "Panic Zone" (feat. N.W.A) – 3:33
9. "Professor X (Saga)" (feat. Professor X) – 4:26
10. "Freak City" (feat. J.B. Beat) – 4:57
11. "Simple Planet" – 3:49
12. "Beatdabeat" – 2:38

== Personnel ==
- Arabian Prince – composer, emulator, musician, Oberheim synthesizer, primary artist, producer, programming, synthesizer, vocals
- The Sheiks – primary artist
- J.B. Beat – composer, primary artist, producers, vocals
- Courtney Branch – producer
- Michael Brebes – engineer, Guitar, Juno, Oberheim synthesizer
- Dr. Dre – performer
- Egon – note editing
- Amin Eshaker – annotation, liner notes
- Shayne Fair – Juno, Oberheim synthesizer
- Kelly Hibbert – mastering, restoration
