= The Beatles Winter 1963 Helen Shapiro Tour =

1963 concert tour by the Beatles

- Tour by The Beatles
- Poster for the Doncaster concerts. A similar layout was used for other posters of this tour.
- Location: United Kingdom
- Start date: 2 February 1963
- End date: 3 March 1963
- Legs: 2
- No. of shows: 14

The Beatles concert chronology
- Winter 1963 UK Tour; Winter 1963 Helen Shapiro Tour; Spring 1963 Tommy Roe / Chris Montez Tour

The Beatles' first English tour lasted from 2 February 1963 until 3 March 1963. The Beatles were fourth on an eleven-act bill headed by 16-year-old Londoner, Helen Shapiro. Other acts on the tour were the Red Price Band, The Kestrels, The Honeys (UK), Dave Allen, Kenny Lynch and Danny Williams. They were also joined briefly by Billie Davis during the latter part of the tour.

The tour was organised by the Arthur Howes Agency. This was the first time that the Beatles had worked with Howes.

== Programme ==
The programme for the tour was:

- Red Price Band
- The Honeys
- Dave Allen
- The Beatles
- Dave Allen
- Danny Williams

—Interval—

- Red Price Band
- The Kestrels
- Kenny Lynch
- Dave Allen
- Helen Shapiro

== Set list ==
The Beatles typical set list for the shows was as follows (with lead singers noted):

1. "Chains" (George Harrison)
2. "Keep Your Hands Off My Baby" (John Lennon)
3. "A Taste of Honey" (Paul McCartney)
4. "Please Please Me" (John Lennon / Paul McCartney)

Two other songs were used as prepared alternatives during the tour:

1. "Love Me Do" (Paul McCartney / John Lennon)
2. "Beautiful Dreamer" (Paul McCartney)

== Winter 1963 Helen Shapiro Tour dates ==
The Shapiro tour was split into two parts.

=== Part 1 ===
The first part lasted from 2 to 10 February, although the Beatles did not play on the 10th, as they needed to be in London early on the 11th. The Beatles played two dates at the Cavern Club, Liverpool on 3 and 4 February, before joining the Shapiro tour again on the 5th.

Date	City	Country	Venue
2 February 1963	Bradford	England	Gaumont
5 February 1963	Doncaster	England	Gaumont
6 February 1963	Bedford	England	Granada
7 February 1963	Wakefield	England	ABC Cinema
8 February 1963	Carlisle	England	Regal
9 February 1963	Sunderland	England	Sunderland Empire Theatre

All dates from Lewisohn

On 11 February, the Beatles recorded the ten tracks that, together with their two previously released singles, formed their debut album, Please Please Me. From 12 to 22 February, they played a number of dates on their own, before joining the Shapiro tour again on the 23.

=== Part 2 ===
The second part lasted from 23 February until 3 March. Travelling to Shrewsbury on 28 February 1963, Lennon and McCartney wrote the next Beatles single, "From Me To You".

Date	City	Country	Venue
23 February 1963	Mansfield	England	Granada
24 February 1963	Coventry	England	Coventry Theatre
26 February 1963	Taunton	England	Gaumont
27 February 1963	York	England	Rialto
28 February 1963	Shrewsbury	England	Granada
1 March 1963	Southport	England	Odeon
2 March 1963	Sheffield	England	Sheffield City Hall
3 March 1963	Hanley	England	Gaumont

All dates from Lewisohn

== Instruments and equipment ==
Instruments The Beatles had on the tour, shown here for each member of the group.

John Lennon

- 1958 Rickenbacker 325 electric guitar
- 1962 Gibson J-160E electro-acoustic guitar (used as backup)
- 1962 Vox AC-30 amplifier

Paul McCartney

- 1961 Höfner 500/1 hollowbody Violin bass
- Quad II/22 Amp modified by Adrian Barber
- 1962 Adrian Barber "Coffin" speaker cabinet

George Harrison

- 1957 Gretsch Duo Jet hollowbody electric guitar
- 1962 Gibson J-160E electro-acoustic guitar (used as backup)
- 1962 Vox AC-30 amplifier

Ringo Starr

- Premier Mahogany drum kit
  - 20×17" bass drum
  - 12×8" rack tom
  - 16×16" floor tom
  - 14×4" Premier Royal Ace wood-shell snare drum

== See also ==
- List of the Beatles' live performances
