= Kaikaku hoshu =

Kaikaku hoshu (Japanese: 改革保守) is a "reformist conservative" that stands out from the established conservatism in the context of Japanese politics. It can be either moderate or extreme than the existing Japanese conservatives, as it mainly refers to a force or line that sets it apart from the right-wing conservatives of the Liberal Democratic Party (LDP). Shukyū hoshu (守旧保守, established conservative) has a contrasting meaning with kaikaku hoshu.

== History ==
Junichiro Koizumi, the former prime minister (2001–2006), was called kaikaku hoshi because he pushed for neoliberal reforms, unlike shukyū hoshu, which has a traditional bureaucratic nature.

Toranosuke Katayama, a former co-leader of Initiatives from Osaka (now the Japan Innovation Party), referred to the party as "we are the reform-minded conservative" (われわれは改革する保守だ). Nobuyuki Baba, a former leader of the Japan Innovation Party, also said, "our party is proud to be the kaikaku hoshu party" (わが党は「改革保守政党」と自負しています).

In Kibō no Tō's declaration of the party's founding, which was re-established in 2018, it is said that "it aims for a 'new kaikaku hoshu politics'" (『新しい改革保守の政治』を目指す).

Democratic Party For the People (DPFP) defines it as "a 'reform centrist' (Kaikaku chūdō, 改革中道) party led by people ranging from moderate-conservatives and liberals". However, DPFP is generally considered centre-right 'conservative' and classified as kaikaku hoshu.
