= Walkin' Back to Happiness =

Single by Helen Shapiro
- B-side: "Kiss 'n Run"
- Released: 29 September 1961 (UK)
- Recorded: 1961
- Genre: Pop
- Label: Columbia (EMI) DB 4715 (UK); Capitol 4662 (US)
- Songwriters: John Schroeder, Mike Hawker
- Producer: Norrie Paramor

Helen Shapiro singles chronology
"You Don't Know" (1961)	"Walkin' Back to Happiness" (1961)	"Tell Me What He Said" (1962)

"Walkin' Back to Happiness" is a 1961 single by Helen Shapiro. The song was written by John Schroeder and Mike Hawker. With backing orchestrations by Norrie Paramor, the song was released in the United Kingdom on the Columbia (EMI) label on 29 September 1961. It was number one in the UK for three weeks beginning 19 October, but only reached #100 on the US Billboard Hot 100, Shapiro's only US chart appearance. The single sold over a million copies and earned Helen Shapiro a golden disc.

== International chart positions ==
Chart (1961/1962)	Peak position
UK Singles Chart	1
Irish Singles Chart	1
New Zealand Singles Chart	1
Israeli Singles Chart	1
South Africa Singles Chart	1
Ultratop (Flanders)	2
Dutch Singles Chart	3
Norway Singles Chart	3
Austrian Singles Chart	4
Swedish Singles Chart	9
Australian Singles Chart	10
French Singles Chart	10
Billboard Hot 100	100

== Cover versions ==
- A cover version in Czech by Marta Kubišová, "S nebývalou ochotou", can be found on YouTube.
- A cover version in Sweden 1969 by the Dutch born Suzie
