= Brother Arab =

Studio album by Arabian Prince
- Released: November 28, 1989
- Recorded: 1989
- Studio: Trax (Hollywood, California)
- Genre: Hip hop
- Length: 39:23
- Label: Orpheus, EMI
- Producer: Arabian Prince (also exec.); That Guy

Arabian Prince chronology
Brother Arab (1989)	Where's My Bytches (1993)

Singles from Brother Arab
- 1. "She's Got a Big Posse" Released: 1989; 2. "Situation Critical" Released: 1989; 3. "Gettin' Down / Dope Thang" Released: 1990

Brother Arab is the debut studio album by American hip hop recording artist Arabian Prince. It was released on November 28, 1989, through Orpheus Records with distribution via EMI USA, a division of Capitol Records. The recording sessions took place at Trax Recording Studios in Hollywood. The album was produced by Tim "That Guy" Reid II and Kim "Arabian Prince" Nazel. The album spawned three singles: "She's Got a Big Posse", "Situation Critical" and "Gettin' Down"/"Dope Thang". Its lead single, "She's Got a Big Posse", peaked at number 9 on the Hot Rap Songs.

The album made it to number 193 on the Billboard 200 and at number 55 on the Top R&B/Hip-Hop Albums chart in the United States.

== Critical reception ==
Professional ratings
Review scores
Source	Rating
AllMusic	3/5 stars
Chicago Tribune	2.5/4 stars

The Chicago Tribune wrote that the album "has good moments throughout, [but] suffers from the absence of the brilliant minds in the NWA troop."

== Track listing ==
No.	Title	Length
1.	"Sound Check"	1:24
2.	"She's Got a Big Posse"	5:12
3.	"Get On Up"	4:06
4.	"Let the Good Times Roll (Nickel Bag)"	3:44
5.	"Never Caught Slippin'"	3:48
6.	"I Got a Big Bonus Beat"	2:16
7.	"Situation Critical"	4:38
8.	"It's a Dope Thang"	3:07
9.	"It's Time to Bone"	4:04
10.	"Now You Have to Understand"	3:47
11.	"Gettin' Down"	3:36
Total length:		39:23

== Personnel ==
- Kim Nazel – main artist, vocals, scratches, producer, mixing, executive producer
- Tim Reid II – scratches, producer, mixing
- Disco D – scratches
- Elwood "The Rock" Carrington – guitar solo (track 2)
- Brian "The Punch" Carney – engineering
- Chris Bellman – mastering
- Henry Marquez – art direction
- Mike Miller – photography

== Charts ==
Chart (1989)	Peak position
US Billboard 200	193
US Top R&B/Hip-Hop Albums (Billboard)	55
