= Dumb Head =

Single by Ginny Arnell

from the album Meet Ginny Arnell
- B-side: "How Many Times Can One Heart Break?"
- Released: November 1963
- Recorded: 1963
- Genre: Pop/Rock
- Length: 2:12
- Label: MGM – R K13177
- Songwriters: David Hess, Camille Monte
- Producer: Jim Vienneau

Ginny Arnell singles chronology
"Trouble's Back in Town" (1963)	"Dumb Head" (1963)	"He's My Little Devil" (1964)

"Dumb Head" is a song recorded by American girl-pop performer Ginny Arnell. It was written by David Hess and Camille Monte, arranged by Al Gorgoni, produced by Jim Vienneau, and released in November 1963. The single was a minor hit, entering the Billboard Hot 100, and was featured on her debut full-length LP, Meet Ginny Arnell. British girl group The Sharades later recorded the song.

== Lyrical composition ==
Lyrically, "Dumb Head" tells the story of a girl who rejected a boy and now regrets it; she calls herself, among other self-demeaning names, a "dumb head" and "a stupid little girl." The song has an irregular phrase rhythm, meaning that Arnell varies the length and rhythm of her lines.

== Recording ==
"Dumb Head" was Arnell's fifth solo single, released over three years after her solo debut, and her second for MGM Records, following "Trouble's Back In Town". Her earlier records had been commercial failures, never charting and receiving little press. The record company teamed her with arranger Al Gorgoni and producer Jim Vienneau. Arnell initially disliked the song "Dumb Head", later saying in an interview:

I said to my manager, "I'm not so sure about this song." I didn't like calling myself a dumb head, especially as I had just graduated high school with high honours. How could I call myself dumb and feel good about it? But when we recorded it, with the kazoos in the background and all, it was fun. It came out really good...

As well as kazoos, the song features a saxophone and organ, and an orchestra arranged by Gorgoni. She also recorded a version of "Dumb Head" in Japanese. Arnell said:

The record was a hit over in Asia and they asked me if I would be nice enough to record the song in Japanese for them. I thought "What?!" But MGM was very good about sending a tutor [who] taught me how to sing it phonetically. It was very exciting and it came out OK. I don't know if it's word-for-word as the American version, but it sure is nice to listen to...

== Release and promotion ==
The song was released as a 7" single, which included the B-side "How Many Times Can One Heart Break?" MGM Records promoted "Dumb Head," among other new releases, in a full-page advertisement placed in the October 26, 1963 edition of Billboard Magazine. Arnell toured to promote the record, and appeared on American Bandstand to lip-sync to the track. The producers mistakenly started playing Bobby Rydell's "Wild One" instead of "Dumb Head," but the mistake was soon corrected and, though Arnell was embarrassed, she completed the appearance. Arnell also embarked on several cross-country tours, spurred on by the song's popularity.

== Critical reception ==
In a 1964 review of "Meet Ginny Arnell," Billboard magazine singled out "Dumb Head" as "a hefty chart entry," going on to give the album a "Pop Special Merit" award designation.

The song is highly regarded retrospectively by some music critics, though others are more skeptical of the song. Allmusic's Dave Thompson praised the song's instrumentation and Arnell's vocal performance, particularly the "duh-di-duh-di-duh" chorus. He went on to conclude that "The real dumbheads [...] were the record buying public of 1963, who could push this amazing record no higher than #50 on the US chart." Vice's Mish Way spoke negatively of Arnell's version, however, commenting that when "Arnell sings this song the lyrics seem pathetic and forced." Trevor Tolliver, in his book You Don't Own Me: The Life and Times of Lesley Gore, called the song "atrocious" and the lyrics "sickening."

== Commercial performance ==
The song reached number 50 on the Billboard Hot 100, spending a total of 12 weeks on the chart. It remains Arnell's only Hot 100 entry, though one of her subsequent singles, "I Wish I Knew What Dress to Wear," managed to reach number 30 on the Bubbling Under Hot 100 Singles chart. "Dumb Head" also reached number 20 on Cashbox's "Looking Ahead" chart dated November 16, 1963, and number 3 on the Chicago Top 40.

Chart (1963)	Peak position
Cashbox Looking Ahead	20
Chicago Top 40	3
US Billboard Hot 100	50

== Legacy and cover versions ==
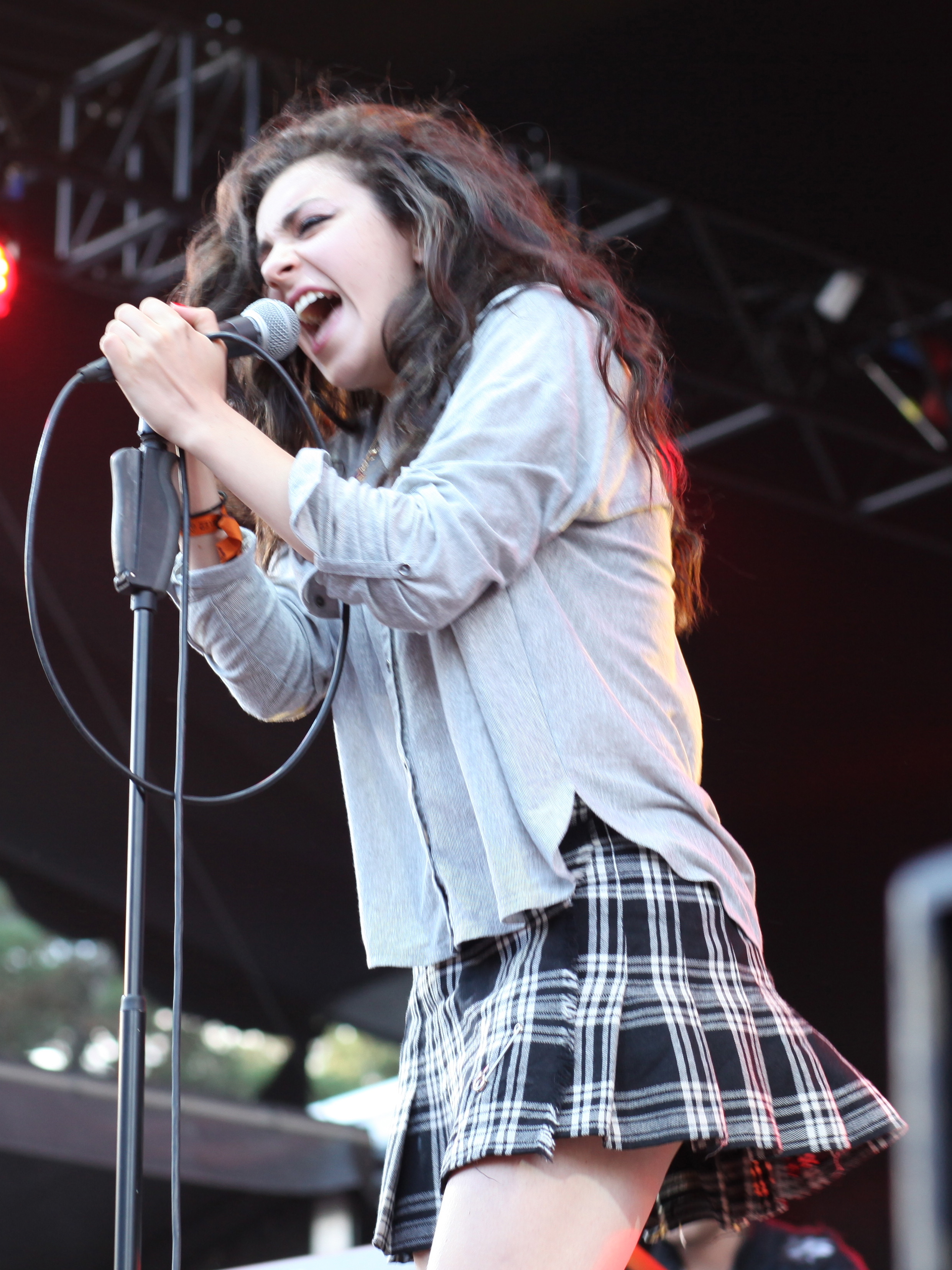
Pop musician Charli XCX (above) has cited "Dumb Head" as an influence when recording Sucker, her second album

The song continues to be regarded by some critics as a girl-pop classic, though others continue to view it as a sub-par girl pop song. It was included on several girl-pop compilations, including Growin' Up Too Fast: The Girl Group Anthology (1996), I Wish I Were a Princess: The Great Lost Female Teen Idols (1997), and Early Girls, Vol. 3 (2000). Charli XCX cited the song as an influence when recording her Sucker album. According to Goldmine Standard Catalog of American Records 1948-1991, the 7" release of "Dumb Head" is now worth $12.

The song was rerecorded by The Sharades and produced by Joe Meek and released in the UK in January 1964. Their cover is highly regarded retrospectively, with many critics noting the song as being better than Arnell's version. Vice's Mish Way, while skeptical of Arnell's recording, praised The Sharades' version, calling it "the cheekiest slumber party anthem that ever existed." Dazed felt that The Sharades' version was a "classic," calling the song "eerie yet compelling with a killer melody." Pitchfork called Meek's production "even more unsettled" than the original. The song has also been covered by rock group Primetime; their version was featured on the compilation album, Typical Girls.
