= Tell Me What He Said =

1960 pop song written by Jeff Barry

Single by Helen Shapiro
- B-side: "I Apologise"
- Released: 1962 (UK)
- Recorded: 1961/1962
- Genre: Pop music
- Label: Columbia (EMI) DB 4715 (UK)
- Songwriter(s): Jeff Barry

Helen Shapiro singles chronology
"Walkin' Back to Happiness" (1961)	"Tell Me What He Said" (1962)	"Let's Talk About Love" (1962)

"Tell Me What He Said" is a 1960 pop song written by Jeff Barry. The song was first recorded by American singer Ginny Arnell, as the B-side of her single "Look Who's Talkin'". It was later recorded in Britain by Helen Shapiro, whose version reached number 2 on the UK singles chart in early 1962.

== Chart performance ==
Helen Shapiro

Chart (1962)	Peak position
Belgium (Ultratop 50 Wallonia)	30
India Singles Charts	1
Irish Singles Charts	2
Israeli Singles Chart	5
New Zealand Charts	4
Norway (VG-lista)	5
UK Singles (OCC)	2
West Germany (GfK)	31
