= 25th Hour =

2002 film by Spike Lee

- Theatrical release poster
- Directed by: Spike Lee
- Screenplay by: David Benioff
- Based on: The 25th Hour by David Benioff
- Produced by: Tobey Maguire; Julia Chasman; Spike Lee; Jon Kilik
- Starring: Edward Norton; Philip Seymour Hoffman; Barry Pepper; Rosario Dawson; Anna Paquin; Brian Cox
- Cinematography: Rodrigo Prieto
- Edited by: Barry Alexander Brown
- Music by: Terence Blanchard
- Production companies: Touchstone Pictures; 25th Hour Productions; 40 Acres and a Mule Filmworks; Gamut Films; Industry Entertainment
- Distributed by: Buena Vista Pictures Distribution
- Release dates: December 16, 2002 (New York City); December 19, 2002 (United States)
- Running time: 135 minutes
- Country: United States
- Language: English
- Budget: $5 million
- Box office: $23.9 million

25th Hour is a 2002 American crime drama film directed by Spike Lee and starring Edward Norton. Adapted by David Benioff from his 2001 debut novel The 25th Hour, it tells the story of a man's last 24 hours of freedom as he prepares to go to prison for seven years for dealing drugs.

25th Hour opened to positive reviews, with various critics since having ranked it as one of the best films of the 2000s and praising its portrayal of New York City after the September 11 attacks. It has since been considered one of Lee's most underrated works. The film was subsequently ranked 26th on the BBC's 100 Greatest Films of the 21st Century list in 2016.

== Plot ==
A car pulls up at night on a New York City street. Monty Brogan and his friend Kostya get out to look at an injured dog lying in the road. Monty intends to perform a mercy kill but changes his mind after looking the dog in the eye.

Years later, Monty is one day away from starting a seven-year prison sentence for drug dealing. On his last day of freedom, he walks the city with Doyle, the dog he rescued, and visits his old high school, where he played varsity basketball as a freshman. Later, he plans to meet childhood friends at a club — Frank Slaughtery, a boorish Wall Street trader, Jacob Elinsky, an introverted high school teacher, and his live-in girlfriend, Naturelle Riviera. In a flashback, Monty remembers the night he was arrested. DEA agents raid Monty's apartment and, knowing where to look, quickly find the drugs he was selling for Uncle Nikolai, a Russian mobster. Kostya tries to persuade Monty it was Naturelle who betrayed him, since she knew where he hid his drugs.

Monty visits his father, James, a former firefighter and recovering alcoholic, at his bar, which has been funded by Monty's drug money. James remorsefully sneaks a drink when Monty goes to the restroom. Facing himself in the mirror, Monty lashes out in his mind against New York ethnic groups, against corporate criminals, and against Osama bin Laden before finally turning on himself for stupidly not giving up his drug business before he was caught. Frank and Jacob meet at Frank's apartment overlooking the World Trade Center site. Jacob muses about seeing Monty again when he is released in seven years. Frank impatiently tells Jacob that, after this night he will never see Monty again.

In a police interview, agents tell Monty that Naturelle is the one who sold him out. They seek to get him to turn on Nikolai by threatening the prospect of a long prison term, and of prison rape. Monty refuses. He recalls how he met Naturelle when he was hanging around his old high school. He asks Frank to find out if it was Naturelle who betrayed him.

Outside the club, Jacob sees Mary, a student he is infatuated with. Monty invites her in, although she is underage. Frank and Monty discuss prison. Frank tries to be encouraging, but Monty is convinced he'll be a victim of rape and have no future when he's released. Mary flirts with Jacob, which causes him to follow her to a bathroom and attempt a kiss, but Mary is frozen in shock and Jacob quickly leaves, considering the consequences.

Frank accuses Naturelle of living on Monty's money despite knowing its origins, and suggests it was she who ratted out Monty. Naturelle slaps him and leaves. Monty and Kostya go to see Nikolai, who gives Monty advice on surviving in prison. Nikolai reveals that it was Kostya who betrayed Monty, and offers him a chance to kill Kostya in exchange for protecting his father. Monty refuses, reminding Nikolai that the mobster was the one who told Monty to trust Kostya in the first place. Monty walks out, leaving Kostya to be killed by the Russian mobsters.

Monty returns to his apartment and apologizes to Naturelle for mistrusting her. He hands Doyle over to Jacob in the park. He again admits that he is terrified of being raped in prison, whereupon he asks Frank to beat him, believing that he might have a chance at survival if he enters the prison ugly. Frank refuses, but Monty goads him into taking out his frustrations, and is left bruised and bloody, with a broken nose.

Naturelle tries to comfort him as Monty's father arrives to take him to Federal Correctional Institution, Otisville. On the drive to prison in upstate New York, Monty again sees a parade of faces from the streets of the city. As they drive up the Henry Hudson Parkway, James suggests they take the George Washington Bridge to go west, into hiding, and gives Monty a vision of a future where he avoids imprisonment, reunites with Naturelle, starts a family, and grows old. When the vision stops, they are past the bridge, still driving toward the prison.

== Cast ==
- Edward Norton as Monty Brogan
- Philip Seymour Hoffman as Jacob Elinsky
- Barry Pepper as Frank Slaughtery
- Rosario Dawson as Naturelle Riviera
- Anna Paquin as Mary D'Annunzio
- Brian Cox as James Brogan
- Tony Siragusa as Kostya Novotny
- Levan Uchaneishvili as Uncle Nikolai
- Tony Devon as Agent Allen
- Misha Kuznetsov as Senka Valghobek
- Isiah Whitlock Jr. as Agent Flood
- Michael Genet as Agent Cunningham
- Patrice O'Neal as Khari
- Al Palagonia as Salvatore Dominick
- Aaron Stanford as Marcuse
- Marc H. Simon as Schultz
- Armando Riesco as Phelan
- Vanessa Ferlito as Lindsay Jamison

== Production ==
=== Development ===
Benioff completed the book The 25th Hour while studying at the University of California Irvine. After he received numerous rejections, it was published in 2001. Six months before that, a preliminary trade copy was circulated; actor and producer Tobey Maguire read it and became interested in playing the lead role of Monty Brogan.

He acquired the option for a potential film project and asked Benioff to adapt it as a screenplay. However, after the script was written, Maguire had become too deeply involved with Spider-Man to take on another acting job; he later served as a producer. Spike Lee expressed an interest in directing the film.

Lee was interested in the long monologue that Benioff called the "fuck monologue", in which Monty ranted against the five boroughs of New York; Benioff had considered leaving it out of the film, but Lee persuaded him to keep it in. Disney picked up the film rights and wanted the monologue cut, but Lee persisted in filming the scene.

The film was in the "planning stages" at the time of the September 11 attacks. Lee "decided not to ignore the tragedy but to integrate it into his story". The feelings of loss and uncertainty suffuse the film.

== Reception ==
25th Hour received an 80% approval rating on Rotten Tomatoes based on 176 reviews. The consensus calls the film "an intelligent and well-acted film despite the usual Spike Lee excesses." On Metacritic it has a score of 69 out of 100 based on reviews from 40 critics, indicating “generally favorable reviews”.

Audiences surveyed by CinemaScore gave the film a grade B− on scale of A to F.

Five years after the September 11 attacks, Mick LaSalle of the San Francisco Chronicle wrote: "Released 15 months after Sept. 11, 2001, Spike Lee's 25th Hour is the only great film dealing with the Sept. 11 tragedy... 25th Hour is as much an urban historical document as Rossellini's Open City, filmed in the immediate aftermath of the Nazi occupation of Rome".

Film critic Roger Ebert added the film to his "Great Movies" list on December 16, 2009. A. O. Scott, Richard Roeper and Roger Ebert all placed it on their respective lists for best films of the 2000 decade.

In a 2016 BBC poll of 177 critics from around the world, it was ranked as the 26th greatest film since 2000.

In July 2025, it ranked number 24 on Rolling Stone's list of "The 100 Best Movies of the 21st Century."

Monty's monologue, or rant, has made many 'top movie rant' lists.

== Music ==
Terence Blanchard composed the film's musical score. Other songs that appear in the film (and are not included in the original score) include:

1. Big Daddy Kane – "Warm It Up, Kane"
2. Craig Mack – "Flava in Ya Ear"
3. The Olympic Runners – "Put the Music Where Your Mouth Is"
4. Grandmaster Melle Mel – "White Lines (Don't Don't Do It)"
5. Liquid Liquid – "Cavern"
6. Cymande – "Bra"
7. Cymande – "Dove"
8. Cymande – "The Message"
9. Bruce Springsteen – "The Fuse"

== In popular culture ==
The Better Call Saul season 1 episode "Bingo" makes both visual and verbal references to the film and its source novel, as well as to The Simpsons. Jimmy tells Kim to "Picture 25th Hour, starring Ned and Maude Flanders", when he phones Kim to tell her the Kettlemans, one of whom is facing jail time, have hired him to replace Kim as their attorney.

== See also ==
- List of cultural references to the September 11 attacks
- List of hood films
