= Arrival (Cymande album) =

Studio album by Cymande
- Released: 1981
- Genre: Funk
- Length: 40:38
- Label: Paul Winley Records
- Producer: Patrick Patterson

Cymande chronology
Promised Heights (1974)	Arrival (1981)

Professional ratings
Review scores
Source	Rating
AllMusic	2/5 stars
The Encyclopedia of Popular Music	3/5 stars

Arrival is the fourth studio album by British funk group Cymande. Recorded in 1974, it was released in 1981 through Paul Winley Records.

== Critical reception ==
Record Collector wrote: "Incredibly dull ballads alternate with less-than-inspired attempts at floor-fillers, with, perhaps, only the closing 'It’s Magic', a Philly International-inspired groove, coming close to scaling the heights of earlier gems." No Depression urged readers to avoid it, writing that it was put out to "cash in on [Cymande's] club cache."

== Track listing ==
1. "What's The Word – Good Times" – 7:22
2. "Living For Your Love" – 5:24
3. "Sweet Talk" – 6:24
4. "Let Me Be The One" – 3:59
5. "Since You've Been Gone" – 4:54
6. "You Won't Feel So Proud" – 4:14
7. "Being With You" – 4:57
8. "It's Magic" – 3:24
