= Shukyū-ha =

Japanese term for conservative factions

Shukyū-ha (守旧派 or 守舊派, lit. "Old Guard") (Note: shǒujiù pài in Chinese, and sugupa (수구파) in Korean) refers to the power and idea of existing traditional values or systems in opposition to any reform movement.

In Chinese history, when the Hundred Days' Reform movement broke out, those who supported it were referred to as 洋務派, and those who opposed it were referred to as 守旧派. In Korean history, those who opposed the Enlightenment Party, who insisted on independence and modernization from the Qing Dynasty, were called 守旧派.

== Translation ==
守旧 commonly translates to "conservative" or "reactionary". However, its meaning is not identical to 保守 (lit. "conservative") or 反動 (lit. "reactionary"); 守旧 focuses more on stubbornly defending the status quo. 派 can be translated as "faction" or "group".

== In Japanese politics ==
In Chinese or Korean politics, 守旧 may mean "ultraconservative" depending on the context, but in Japan, "shukyū" or "Shukyū-ha" is not usually translated as "ultraconservative", as right-wing nationalists/conservatives are also used to criticize politicians who oppose the Article 9 of the Japanese Constitution.

=== Shukyū hoshu ===
In Japanese politics, there is also the term Shukyū hoshu (守旧保守), which has the opposite meaning to Kaikaku hoshu (改革保守, lit. "reformist conservative").

Junichiro Koizumi, the former prime minister (2001 – 2006), was called kaikaku hoshu because he pushed for neoliberal reforms, unlike shukyū hoshu, which has a traditional bureaucratic nature.

== See also ==
- Negative campaigning – Shukyū-ha is often not used in a positive context, and can be used to blame certain conservatives.
