= Status quo =

Latin term meaning the existing state of affairs

Status quo is a Latin phrase meaning the existing state of affairs, particularly with regard to social, economic, legal, environmental, political, religious, scientific or military issues. In the sociological sense, the status quo refers to the current state of social structure or values. With regard to policy debate, it means how conditions are contrasted with a possible change. For example: "The countries are now trying to maintain the status quo with regard to their nuclear arsenals." To maintain the status quo is to keep things the way they presently are.

The related phrase status quo ante, literally 'the status before', refers to the state of affairs that existed previously.

== Political usage ==
The status quo may be changed via social movements. These seek to alleviate or prevent a particular issue and often to shape social feeling and cultural expression of a society or nation.

Advocating to improve the status quo is a persuasive rhetorical device. This is sometimes critiqued as a policy of deliberate ambiguity as not formalizing or defining the adverse situation.

Economist Clark Kerr reportedly said: "The status quo is the only solution that cannot be vetoed."

Karl Marx viewed organized religion as a means for the bourgeoisie to keep the proletariat content with an unequal status quo.

== See also ==
- List of Latin phrases
- Conservatism
  - Shukyū-ha
- Status quo bias
- Status quo ante bellum
- Speaker Denison's rule
