= Potliquor =

American rock band

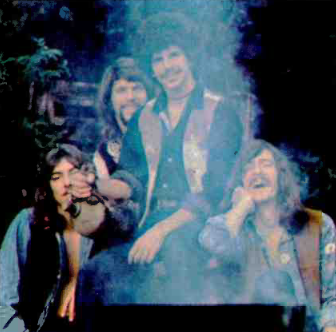
- Potliquor in 1970

Background information
- Origin: Baton Rouge, Louisiana, United States
- Genres: Southern rock, blues rock
- Years active: 1969–1979
- Labels: Janus, Capricorn, Capitol
- Spinoff of: Basement Wall
- Past members: Jerry Amoroso: 1969–1979; George Ratzlaff: 1969–1973; Guy Schaeffer: 1969–1979; Les Wallace: 1969–1973; Mike McQuaig: 1974–1979; Steve Sather: 1979; Steve Gunter:

Potliquor (sometimes erroneously spelled Pot Liquor) was a 1970s southern rock group from Baton Rouge, Louisiana. The band was formed by George Ratzlaff and Guy Schaeffer after the breakup of a successful cover band named the Basement Wall. Like several other bands of the American South, their musical style was a synthesis of influences such as Little Richard, Ray Charles, and more, making Potliquor a part of the nascent Southern rock genre. Potliquor released four albums plus a compilation album but had only one hit single written and sung by George Ratzlaff.

Potliquor was a top regional touring band during the early 1970s, and although they made several national tours with prominent rock groups of the time, they never became the headliner of their own tour, but did headline specific shows with some surprising opening acts, like The Allman Brothers Band, ZZ Top, Aerosmith, and Billy Joel. The group suffered through internal conflicts after the death of their manager in 1973, and after several personnel changes, they were never able to recover the momentum built up through 1970–1973 to reach national prominence like some of the big name bands and individuals they performed with: the Allman Brothers, Billy Joel, REO Speedwagon, Ray Charles, Lou Rawls, Aerosmith, Cactus, ZZ Top, B.B. King, Faces, and many more. Potliquor held the dubious distinction of being the only band booked to play the Fillmore West just before it closed forever.

== Name ==
Potliquor took its name from the term "pot liquor" which is the broth that is left after cooking vegetables and meats. In the South, it is commonly drunk or otherwise used rather than being thrown away. While many argue that the traditional spelling of "potlikker" is correct, "pot liquor" has become the acceptable form. This was only one of many references to their region and state of origin that Potliquor made in their work.

== Influences and style ==
Potliquor played a south Louisiana-tinged version of Southern rock. Combining references to their native Louisiana in many of their album and song titles and lyrics ("Down the River Boogie", "Ol’ Man River", "Riverboat", "Levee Blues", "Waiting for Me at the River", "Louisiana Rock & Roll", "Red Stick", "Louisiana Lady") with lead singer George Ratzlaff's powerful, gospel/soul voice, Potliquor became a part of the Southern rock wave of the early 1970s. Much of their music was blues-based as revealed in song titles such as "Levee Blues", "Rooster Blues", "Taj and Jimmy’s Blues", "St. Jude’s Blues", and several songs were gospel-based ("When God Dips His Love in My Heart", "Beyond the River Jordan", "H", "St. Jude’s Blues").

Martin Popoff wrote a review printed in the book Southern Rock Review of Potliquor's first album. His comments though were particularly aimed toward the music of the first album.

The band's sound is a hotbed of cool southern traditions crossed with the psych stylings of the Guess Who and the Hammond hard rock of Deep Purple. Many attractions along the way: the band's cover of "You're No Good" is bruisingly power-chorded almost to Sabbatherian levels (in the mean time kicking Van Halen's dopey take outta bed), or at least hard Fireball-era Purple. Edgar Allan Poe's "The Raven" gets a damp and creaky House Of The Rising Sun-type treatment, all creeped out toward Steppenwolf and Iron Butterfly with harsh electric guitar soloing. "Old Man River" swings right round the other way, reverential, deep-seated although slightly affected. Originals are just as diverse, pioneering and often heavy. Opener "Down The River Boogie" is a proto-southern rocker built on a gentle riff but a riff nonetheless. "Riverboat" and "Price 20 Cents A Copy" are fast James Brown-type showy tunes buoyed by the band's patented harmonies and raucous arrangements. And wiggin' right out is "Toballby", a committed Deep Purple jam complete with an eclectic Paicey-style drum solo. Bit of a roll call there, but the point is, this thing is sequenced for driving pleasure. Potliquor finding fortune at the crossroads between late 60's hard rock, the newly emerging southern sound combining gospel, boogie and the blues, and the last vestiges of foggy proggy psyche.

== History ==
=== Beginnings ===
Formed in 1969 in Baton Rouge, Louisiana, Potliquor was originally composed of George Ratzlaff (keyboards, rhythm guitar, vocals), and Guy Schaeffer (bass, vocals). The group auditioned drummers and guitarist and chose Jerry Amoroso (drums, percussion, vocals) and Les Wallace (guitar, vocals). Each of the members was a veteran of the Baton Rouge music scene. Ratzlaff, and Schaeffer in fact, had been members of the Basement Wall, the highest-paid cover band in the South during the late 60s, according to the Louisiana Entertainment Association. Jim Brown, a local promoter and owner of a Baton Rouge club, the Speakeasy, was uniquely instrumental in the formation of the band and arranged the "name-the-band-contest" that resulted in Potliquor's naming.

When the New Orleans Pop Festival was being planned Jim Brown offered to coordinate acts and times on stage. This enabled him to place his act, Potliquor, in a prime time slot on Saturday night of the festival. The New Orleans Pop Festival, held August 30 - September 1, 1969—only two weeks after the Woodstock Music Festival—at the Louisiana International Speedway in Prairieville, LA about 65 miles up the Mississippi River from New Orleans. Reports of attendance varied greatly. Some saying 25,000 - 30,000 and other believe it to have been well over 100,000 people, the festival boasted an impressive amount of national talent, including five veterans of Woodstock—Janis Joplin, the Grateful Dead, Santana, Jefferson Airplane, Country Joe and the Fish—along with Canned Heat, the Byrds, the Youngbloods, Iron Butterfly, Oliver, It's a Beautiful Day, Chicago, Lee Michaels, Spiral Starecase, and Tyrannosaurus Rex (before they were renamed T. Rex).

=== 1970 ===
Potliquor helped headline the smaller Festival of Man and Earth in May 1970, held in the Baton Rouge area with Ginger Valley, Goat Leg, Eternity's Children, Bloodrock, Ox, and the Ides of March also performing.

By early September, Potliquor had signed with Janus Records, a subsidiary of the GRT Corporation. On a small, full-color ad on the front page of the September 26, 1970 edition of Billboard, Janus describe Potliquor as a "river blues" group from Baton Rouge who "created a sensation at the New Orleans Pop Festival and were sought after by many record labels..." and who were about "to embark on their first national tour." Officially released by Janus Records in November, Potliquor's debut album, First Taste, had been recorded in the previous months at Baton Rouge's Deep South Recording Studio, produced by manager Jim Brown and engineered by Cy Frost. Frost also wrote (as Giuseppe Efronetée) and played guitar on "Driftin," a song later released as a Decca single by the British rock group Fat Chance. First Taste got a very favorable review by Bob Glassenberg of Billboard, who ended the review with "It should hit with impact." About a month later, Glassenberg reviewed a live performance by Potliquor at the Village Gate club in Greenwich Village, New York, calling the group "a hard rock group" with "tinges of the Bayou country on every song." He described them as "stylistically unique" and concluded by saying that they were "a good, energetic new group on the pop scene."

=== 1971 ===
While the beginning of 1971 saw Pye Records' progressive label Dawn release First Taste in the United Kingdom and Europe, Potliquor was back in Baton Rouge beginning work in February on their second album, Levee Blues, at the Deep South Recording Studios, but this time even though Jim Brown's title on the album remained 'producer' he turned over the actual production responsibilities to Cy Frost, a genius in his own right.

Another tour took the group back to the west coast where they appeared with the Joy of Cooking and Hugh Masekela and the Union of South Africa on April 3, 1971, on a special program, Calebration, on a San Francisco, California TV station. This special, held in conjunction with the Bay Area Hi-Fi Show had radio stations in San Francisco, San Jose, and Los Angeles broadcasting a quadraphonic stereo signal. Later in the month, the group was booked to perform at Winterland (Bill Graham’s larger, alternative venue to the Fillmore West) in San Francisco with Ten Years After and Cactus on April 30 - May 1, 1971, but this performance was never to be as both venues shut down. The promotional poster and other advertising were already in place but the concert never happened.

Although the new album was scheduled to be completed in May, it wasn't until August that Potliquor completed work on Levee Blues, and the LP was released at the end of 1971.

At this point, things were looking very promising for Potliquor. Billboard reported in September that a U.K. tour was in the planning stages and Chess/Janus Records executives were publicly stating their plans to promote Levee Blues. An article in the December 25, 1971 Billboard, which described the evolving strategy of emphasizing album promotion over purely album sales, quoted the newly hired Chess/Janus Records promoter Don Graham as saying that Potliquor was his special project and that he was convinced that he could break them nationally. "I've got until January to make Potliquor tomorrow's hero. Thank God I've got something to work with." Additionally, Potliquor's Levee Blues was one of six Chess/Janus albums which were promoted in a full-page ad in Billboard. Billboard ended a good year for Potliquor by describing Levee Blues as having "...the heavy material and performance to break them into the chart with solid sales impact. Group of the south is really together with their own rockin' with strong cuts..."

=== 1972 ===
The future continued to look bright for Potliquor as 1972 began with Billboard singling out Potliquor's new single, "Cheer", off the Levee Blues album, as having the potential to "make a heavy dent on the Billboard Hot 100 chart." Marvin Schlachter, the president of Chess/Janus, publicly praised Potliquor's potential: "We just released a cut from their Levee Blues LP as a single because we found that that cut 'Cheer' was receiving a great deal of play from air personalities across the country. ...We have a strong artist roster… Artists such as Potliquor...are examples of the newer artists that we have...".

By the beginning of February, "Cheer" had broken into Billboard's Hot 100 chart. Touring in support of the Levee Blues album with Savoy Brown, Potliquor ended the tour in Los Angeles where they performed at the Whisky a Go Go on February 24, 1972. This performance received national publicity when Billboard described their performance as "truly foot-itching, get-up-and-dance music" and described the band as having paid "their dues with years of minor deep-South gigs."

After a month and a half, "Cheer" reached its highest position at number 65 on the Billboard Hot 100 on March 18, 1972. Few weeks later, "Cheer" recorded its final week at number 87 after being on the chart for 11 weeks.

At the beginning of March, Potliquor started a six-week tour with Bloodrock and Cactus with a break in the schedule to appear at the Mar Y Sol Pop Festival in Puerto Rico on April 1–3, 1972. Other notable artists appearing at the festival were Alice Cooper, the Allman Brothers Band, B. B. King, Billy Joel, Brownsville Station, Cactus, Dave Brubeck, Emerson Lake and Palmer, Faces, the J. Geils Band, Long John Baldry, Herbie Mann, and the Mahavishnu Orchestra with John McLaughlin.

By the middle of the year, record executives were feeling very positive about Potliquor's future. The group appeared on the Real Don Steele [TV] Show on June 18, 1972, with Peter Yarrow and Billy Joel. Chess/Janus President Marv Schlachter announced that the merger of the Chess, Janus, and GRT records labels, the hiring of national promotion and college/FM exploitation staff, and a stable of solid talent had turned the bottom line of the company around. He made the claim that they had broken Potliquor nationally.

Before heading back to the studio, Potliquor played with Uriah Heep and Long John Baldry at the Sunshine Inn in Asbury Park, New Jersey, on June 27, 1972. Back at home, Potliquor had two notable appearances, performing at City Park in New Orleans, Louisiana, where they closed down WRNO-FM's Day in the Park concert on July 23, 1972, playing several songs with fellow southern rock musicians Dickey Betts and Gregg Allman, and on August 24, 1972, at Baton Rouge's Independence Hall with REO Speedwagon.

While Potliquor appeared in December on the Real Don Steele Show's "Salute to the Hits of 1972" special, work was being completed on their third album.

=== 1973 ===
Louisiana Rock & Roll was released in January 1973, again produced by Jim Brown and engineered by Cy Frost. Chess/Janus supported the new LP with a full-color advertisement across the bottom of Page 1 of the February 10, 1973 edition of Billboard and a full page B&W advertisement promoting 11 new albums from the artists, including Potliquor.

The first part of 1973 saw Potliquor in concert with Boz Scaggs, but on May 3, 1973, Potliquor was involved with a very unusual concert, particularly for the time. The group played at a Youth Concert at the Pete Maravich Assembly Center with the Baton Rouge Symphony Orchestra, each playing separate sets and then combining for Potliquor music backed by the orchestra. This was one of the first instances of a rock group performing live with a symphony orchestra.

The middle of the year saw Potliquor in concert with several different bands in different venues: the Eagles and the Charlie Daniels Band at The Warehouse in New Orleans; Black Oak Arkansas at the Monroe Civic Center in Monroe, Louisiana; in Rapid City, South Dakota; at Independence Hall in Baton Rouge with Steely Dan and Gladstone; and with Wishbone Ash in El Paso, Texas.

=== Dissolution ===
At some point in 1973, however, things started going downhill for the group. The band's long-time manager and record producer, Jim Brown, died in a car accident. Apparently Brown was the group's peacemaker, and with his death, the band became embroiled in internal conflicts. Local musician, Leon Medica, later of LeRoux, had been filling in from time-to-time for bass player, Guy Schaeffer. He, in fact, substituted for Schaeffer on two tracks during the Levee Blues recording sessions and during some of the Louisiana Rock & Roll sessions and played with Potliquor, at the very least, for the May 3, 1973 concert with the Baton Rouge Symphony. After Brown's death, Schaeffer was dropped from the group. Several members of a local Baton Rouge group, the Warbabies, were added, and drummer Jerry Amoroso was also dropped from the band. According to Amoroso, he held the copyright on the name "Potliquor", but George Ratzlaff owned the publishing company and the entire catalog of original songs from the first 3 albums.

=== Re-formation ===
Amoroso called up former bandmate Schaeffer and with local guitarist Mike McQuaig re-formed Potliquor. However, the loss of Ratzlaff's distinctive voice and of the songwriting talents of Ratzlaff (11 of 14 of the original songs on the first three albums were written by Ratzlaff with additional written by all four members, 2 by Wallace) made this version of Potliquor quite different in nature from the first. Through 1977, there were no national or regional tours and no promotional efforts on behalf of Chess/Janus Records. Emerging as the group's leader, Amoroso flew to New York, New York to sell a record company on a recording deal for the group but to no avail. Finally in early 1977, Potliquor signed a contract with Capricorn Records and released the single, "New York City You Ain’t" in March 1977. This effort led to no direct success for the band, but eventually Amoroso, Schaeffer, Mike McQuaig, and new guitarist Steve Sather went into the Studio in the Country in Bogalusa, Louisiana to record their eponymous album Potliquor which was released in 1979 by Capitol Records. Unfortunately, the new radio-friendly style lacked not only the old southern rock groove but failed to get any Top-40 traction, and the new band broke apart soon after.

== Retrospective ==
Potliquor was one of the early groups of the new genre of music that came to be known as Southern rock. Incorporating a blending of elements of differing native musical styles and the inclusion of lyrics and titles from their southern Louisiana, Potliquor was a group of originality and creativity. They entered the business of rock music at a crucial time where much was possible, and they rubbed shoulders with many groups who would become immensely successful. (Potliquor played gigs where Aerosmith, ZZ Top, and Billy Joel opened for them, according to Ratzlaff, "but they were young then.") However, Potliquor's regional musical style and relatively small record label worked against them. The group's disintegration in 1973 ended a very promising career, and by the time the group was re-formed a few years later, their window of opportunity had closed.

== Album art and cultural references ==
As previously stated, Potliquor and its musical content and style are integrally connected to its Southern U.S. and south Louisiana culture. Potliquor's choice of album art also makes explicit its geographic and cultural foundations.

- The front cover of the First Taste album is a photograph of the group sitting down (left to right, Guy Schaeffer, George Ratzlaff, Jerry Amoroso, Les Wallace) with a glass jug, like one which would be thought to hold moonshine, being held by Amoroso. On the inside foldout, a large image of a similar jug is displayed with liner notes printed on it. The title, "First Taste", and the moonshine jug implies that this debut album is a first taste of the music of Potliquor, a play on the term "pot liquor" which is not liquor but is actually the broth that is left in the pot after cooking down vegetables. The other inner photo shows the group horse-playing in shallow water of a Louisiana bayou. On the back cover, the group is photographed around a campfire.
- The Levee Blues album art consists of a monochromatic pen and ink drawing in a psychedelic style. On the front, the four musicians are drawn sitting on the bank of a river or bayou. The drawing continues on the back where there is a plantation home set back a short distance from the river on the top of the river levee. This drawing was executed by local Baton Rouge artist and stained glass maker Marty McCoy, a student of well known LSU art Professor Paul DuFour. The inside of the foldout cover contains photos of the band in the recording studio with liner notes written in cursive around the pictures.
- The front cover art of Louisiana Rock & Roll is a drawing of a bayou with swamp vegetation and Spanish moss-laden live oak trees. The four members of Potliquor are drawn sitting around mushrooms which are cut and oriented so as to spell out the name "Potliquor"; the album name is spelled out in a watery font. The LP covers open up so that the front and back covers are a continuation of the art, and on the back, the faces of the band members appear half-hidden behind vines and the root system of a cypress tree. On the inside is a concert photograph of Potliquor on stage with liner notes to the right.
- For both the Potliquor and The Best of Potliquor albums, the front covers feature a photo of small group of people standing on a levee bordering a large river with a paddle wheel riverboat passing by. The back cover of the Potliquor album has pictures of the four band members in a four square pattern with liner notes above them and to the left side of the back cover.

== Discography ==
- First Taste (1970)
- Levee Blues (1971)
- Louisiana Rock & Roll (1973)
- Potliquor (1979)
- The Best of Potliquor (2008)

=== Singles ===
A Side	B Side	Album	Single Release	Comments
Riverboat	Down the River Boogie	First Taste	1971	
You're No Good	Price 20 Cents a Copy	First Taste	1971	
Cheer	Chattanooga	Levee Blues	1972	Cheer, which peaked on the Billboard Hot 100 chart at No. 65, was not originally planned for the Levee Blues album; it was the result of a studio jam session after the album was thought to be complete.
Levee Blues	Beyond the River Jordan	Levee Blues	1972	
Waitin’ for Me at the River	Levee Blues	Louisiana Rock & Roll	1973	Produced by Jim Brown & Cy Frost Janus single J-195
"H"	St. Jude's Blues	Louisiana Rock & Roll	1973	
New York City You Ain't	Luzianne	None	1976	The relative lack of commercial success by this single resulted in cancellation of the planned album.
Oh So Long	Unknown	Potliquor	1979	

== Recognition and awards ==
- Potliquor was inducted into the Louisiana Entertainment Hall of Fame on June 12, 2005, at an induction ceremony concert at Boomtown New Orleans in Harvey, Louisiana.
- On October 20, 2013, Potliquor was inducted into the Louisiana Music Hall of Fame. The band performed an induction ceremony concert at Club Coozan in Baton Rouge with LMHOF Executive Director Mike Shepherd on hand to formally induct the band.
- Original keyboardist/vocalist George Ratzlaff was nominated for a 1981 Grammy Award for his songwriting contribution of "Everyday I've Got To Sing Some" to the nominated album, Spreadin’ Like Wildfire, by the Archers in the category of Best Gospel Performance – Contemporary Or Inspirational. The Archers performed Ratzlaff's song during their Grammy performance that year. In later years, Ratzlaff formed a Christian group named Legacy.
