= Helen Shapiro =

English singer and actor (b. 1946)

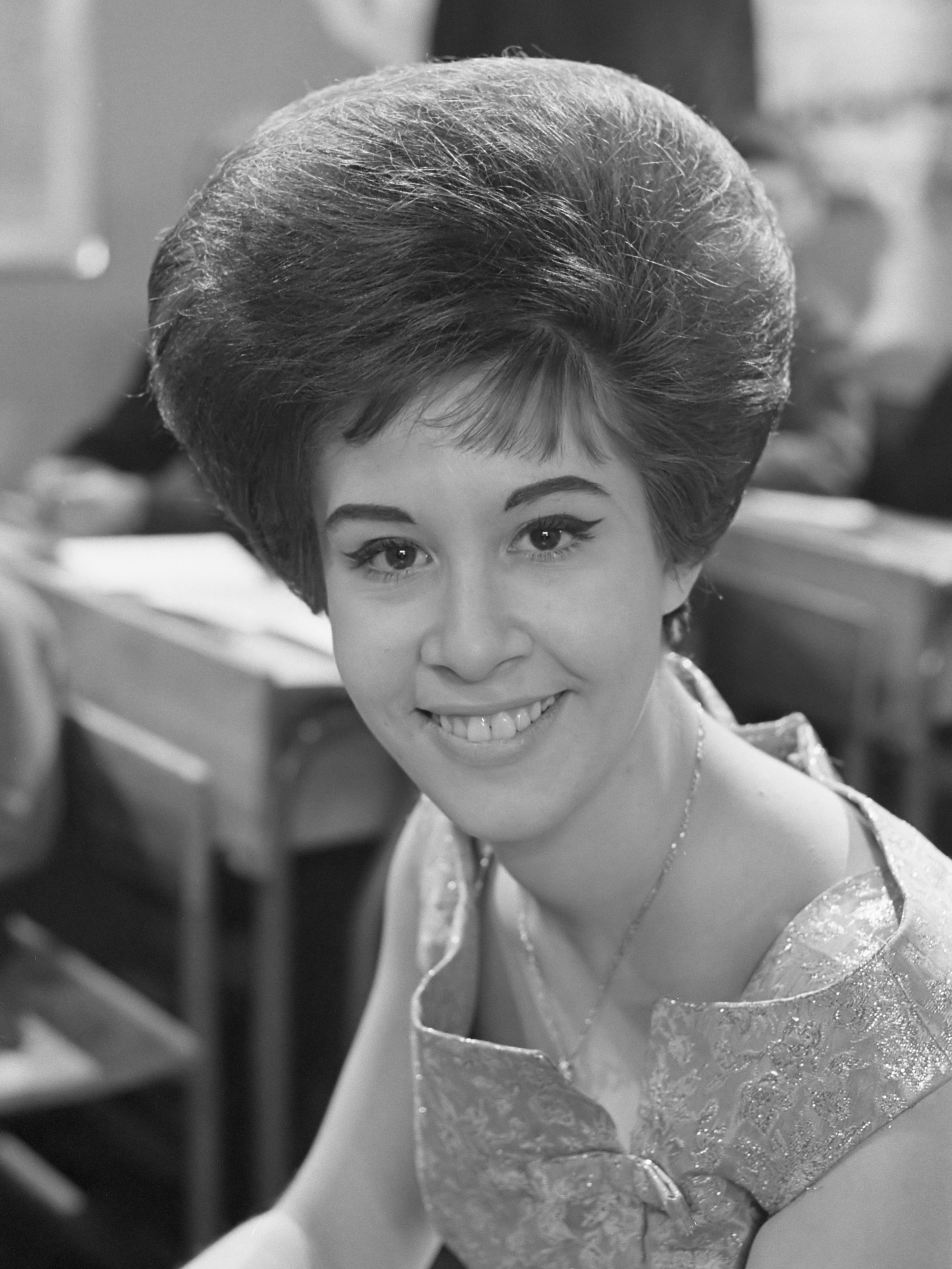
- Shapiro in 1963

Background information
- Born: Helen Kate Shapiro; 28 September 1946 (age 80); Bethnal Green, London, England
- Genres: Pop, jazz
- Occupations: Singer, actress
- Years active: 1961–present

Helen Kate Shapiro (born 28 September 1946) is a British pop and jazz singer and actress. While still a teenager in the early 1960s, she was one of Britain's most successful female singers. With a voice described by AllMusic as possessing "the maturity and sensibilities of someone far beyond their teen years", Shapiro recorded two 1961 UK chart toppers, "You Don't Know" and "Walkin' Back to Happiness", when she was just 14 years old.

Shapiro first achieved prominence in 1961 when her debut single, "Don't Treat Me Like a Child", reached number three on the UK Singles Chart. Her success continued in 1962 with further hits including "Tell Me What He Said" and film appearances in Play It Cool and It's Trad, Dad! In 1963, Shapiro toured with the Beatles, who were her supporting act. Since the 1970s, she has branched out as a performer in musical theatre and jazz; she appeared in the West End and toured extensively with the British jazz trumpeter Humphrey Lyttelton and his band.

== Early life ==
Shapiro was born at Bethnal Green Hospital in the East End district of Bethnal Green, London. Her early childhood was spent in a Clapton council flat in the London Borough of Hackney, where she attended Northwold Primary School and Clapton Park Comprehensive School until Christmas 1961. She is the granddaughter of Russian-Jewish immigrants; her parents, who were piece-workers in the garment industry, attended Lea Bridge Road Synagogue. The family moved from Clapton to the Victoria Park area of Hackney, on the Parkside Estate, when she was nine. "It was, and remains, a beautiful place", she said in a 2006 interview.

Although too poor to own a record player, Shapiro's parents encouraged music in their home (she had to borrow a neighbour's player to hear her first single). Shapiro played banjolele as a child and occasionally sang with her brother Ron in the skiffle group of his youth club. She had a deep timbre to her voice, unusual in a girl not yet in her teens; school friends nicknamed her "Foghorn".

At the age of 10, Shapiro was a singer with Susie and the Hula Hoops (together with her cousin, 1960s singer Susan Singer), a school band that included Marc Bolan (then using his real name of Mark Feld) as guitarist. At 13, she started singing lessons at the Maurice Burman School of Modern Pop Singing, based in London's Baker Street, after the school produced singing star Alma Cogan. "I had always wanted to be a singer. I had no desire to slavishly follow Alma's style, but chose the school merely because of Alma's success", she said in a 1962 interview. Burman's connections included John Schroeder, a young songwriter man at EMI's Columbia Records, who recorded a demonstration tape of Shapiro singing "Birth of the Blues", and motivated by her singing, signed her to the label.

== Early career ==
In February 1961, at 14, Shapiro released her first single, "Don't Treat Me Like a Child". The song was recorded at EMI Recording Studios, Abbey Road with a nine-piece band under the direction of Martin Slavin. After Helen's appearance on the ITV music programme Thank Your Lucky Stars, the record took off and reached number three in the UK Singles Chart in May 1961. According to AllMusic, Shapiro's rich, mature voice made her "an extraordinary new phenomenon on the British pop scene." Her next single, the ballad "You Don't Know", topped the chart in August. The follow-up, "Walkin' Back to Happiness", was written by John Schroeder and Mike Hawker and featured backing orchestrations by Norrie Paramor. The single quickly reached the top of the chart with far greater sales than her last in October 1961, by which time Shapiro had turned 15. She had initially been reluctant to record the song, as she considered it old-fashioned and corny. Both of Shapiro's number-one singles sold over a million copies, earning her two gold discs. Her mature voice made her an overnight sensation, as well as the youngest female chart topper in the UK.

Shapiro's next single release, "Tell Me What He Said", peaked at number two, meaning each of her first four single releases made the top three of the UK Singles Chart. Her success led to film roles; she appeared as herself in the Billy Fury film Play It Cool and played the lead female role in Richard Lester's It's Trad, Dad! Her final UK Top Ten hit single was with the ballad "Little Miss Lonely", which peaked at number eight for two weeks in 1962. Before she was sixteen years old, Shapiro had been voted Britain's "Top Female Singer".

The Beatles' first national tour of Britain, in the late winter and early spring of 1963, was as one of her supporting acts. During the course of the tour, John Lennon and Paul McCartney wrote the song "Misery" for her, but Shapiro's producer, Norrie Paramor, turned it down, and she did not record the composition. In 1995, during an episode of This Is Your Life highlighting her life and career, Shapiro revealed, "It was actually turned down on my behalf before I ever heard it, actually. I never got to hear it or give an opinion. It's a shame, really." Shapiro lip-synched her then-current single, "Look Who It Is", on the British television programme Ready Steady Go! with three of the Beatles (John Lennon, Ringo Starr, and George Harrison). In January 1964 she released her cover version of the song Fever, made famous by Peggy Lee in the late 1950s. Shapiro's version, however, did not do as well as hoped, reaching only no. 38, and was her last UK chart hit.

On 31 December 1969, Shapiro appeared in the BBC-ZDF co-production, Pop Go the Sixties, singing "Walkin' Back to Happiness".

By the time she was in her late teens, Shapiro's career as a pop singer was on the wane. With the new wave of beat music and newer female singers such as Dusty Springfield, Cilla Black, Sandie Shaw, and Lulu, Shapiro appeared old-fashioned and emblematic of the pre-Beatles era of the 1950s. As her pop career declined, Shapiro turned to cabaret appearances, touring the workingmen's clubs of the north-east of England. Her final cabaret show took place at Peterlee's Senate Club on 6 May 1972, where she announced she was giving up touring, as she was "travel-weary" and had had enough of "living out of a suitcase". Later, after a change of mind, she branched out as a performer in musical theatre and jazz, one of her musical interests.

== Later career ==
Shapiro played the role of Nancy in Lionel Bart's musical Oliver! in London's West End and appeared in a British television soap opera, Albion Market, where she played one of the main characters until it was taken off air in August 1986. Shapiro also played the part of Sally Bowles in Cabaret and starred in Seesaw to great critical acclaim.

Between 1984 and 2001, she toured extensively with British jazz trumpeter Humphrey Lyttelton and his band, whilst still performing her own jazz and pop concerts. Her one-woman show, Simply Shapiro, ran from 1999 to the end of 2002.

Her autobiography, published in 1993, is titled Walking Back to Happiness. She appeared in August 2012 as a guest on BBC Radio 4's The Reunion in a programme about "60s Girl Singers". In March 2013 she appeared on BBC Radio 3's Good Morning Sunday.

Since 2015, she has played in a trio called Hebron with Chrissy Rodgers and Simon Elman. They are promoted via Shapiro's ministry umbrella, Manna Music.

== Personal life ==
She married the theatre producer Duncan Weldon in 1967 and they divorced in 1971.

In 1982, Shapiro met John Judd (real name John Williams), an actor with numerous roles in British television and cinema. They were married on 31 August 1988.

In 1987, she became a Messianic Jew. She temporarily retired from show business in 2002.

== Discography ==
Studio albums

- 'Tops' with Me (1962)
- Helen's Sixteen (1963)
- Helen in Nashville (1963)
- Helen Hits Out! (1964)
- All for the Love of Music (1978)
- Straighten Up and Fly Right (1983)
- Echoes of the Duke (1985)
- The Quality of Mercer (1987)
- I Can't Get Started (1990)
- The Pearl (1990)
- I Want To See You (1991)
- Kadosh (1992)
- Nothing but the Best (1995)
- Enter into His Gates (1997)
- Sing Swing Together (1998)
- By Request (1998)
- Simply Shapiro (2000)
- What Wondrous Love Is This (2010)

== In popular culture ==
In the "Rock Notes" sketch on Monty Python's Contractual Obligation Album, Eric Idle jokingly refers to "Helen Shapiro" as the last of many names with which a particular rock band reinvents itself after every break-up: "That last name, their favourite, had to be dropped following an injunction, and they split up again."

The 1975 song "Miss Shapiro", the sixth track on the first Phil Manzanera solo album Diamond Head, is named in reference to Helen Shapiro.. Brian Eno wrote and sang the lyrics. A live version of the song also appears on the album 801 Live recorded in 1976.

== See also ==
- List of artists who reached number one on the Australian singles chart
- List of artists who reached number one on the UK Singles Chart
- List of British Jewish entertainers
- List of Columbia Graphophone Company artists
- List of people from the London Borough of Hackney
