= State of affairs (sociology) =

The state of affairs is the combination of circumstances applying within a society or group at a particular time. The current state of affairs may be considered acceptable by many observers, but not necessarily by all. The state of affairs may present a challenge, or be complicated, or contain a conflict of interest. The status quo represents the existing state of affairs. Unresolved difficulties or disagreements concerning the state of affairs can provoke a crisis. Dispute resolution is naturally desired, and naturally provided, by forms of inclusive social interaction, such as consensus decision-making, which adapt, but not conveniently, from a family or tribal model to encompass a global scope. Current knowledge and discussion about the state of affairs is communicated through the media.

== See also ==
- De facto
- Fact
- Possible world
- The powers that be
