= Arabian Prince =

American rapper (born 1965)

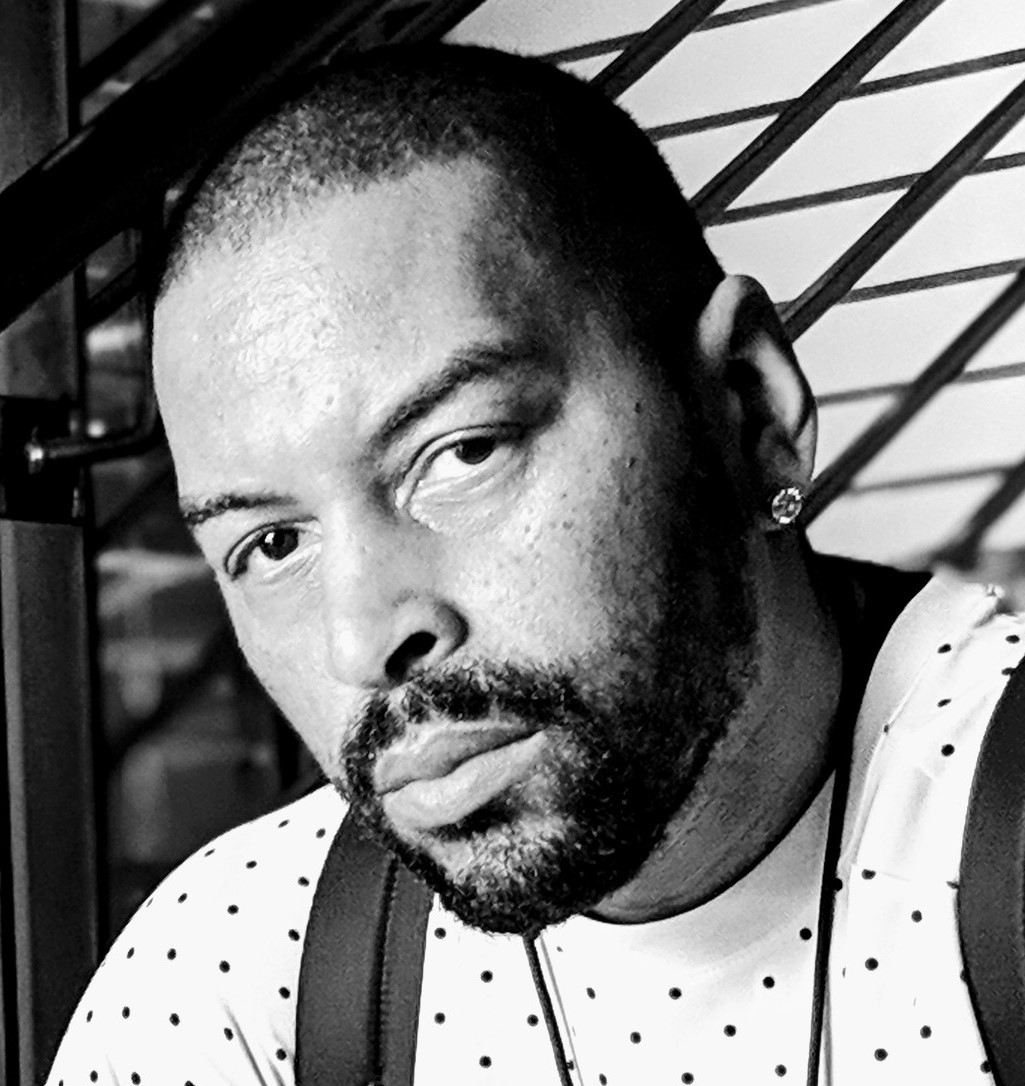
- Arabian Prince in 2018

Background information
- Also known as: Professor X
- Born: Kim Renard Nazel; June 17, 1965 (age 61); Compton, California, U.S.
- Genres: Hip-hop; electro; gangsta rap
- Occupations: Rapper; singer; songwriter; DJ; record producer
- Instruments: Vocals; synthesizer; keyboards; turntables; drum machine; sampler
- Years active: 1984–present
- Labels: Orpheus; Da Bozak; Macola; Stones Throw
- Formerly of: N.W.A

Kim Renard Nazel (born June 17, 1965), better known by his stage names Arabian Prince or Professor X, is an American rapper, singer, and record producer. He was a founding member of N.W.A and contributed to several tracks from N.W.A. and the Posse (1987) and their debut studio album Straight Outta Compton (1989), the latter of which was released shortly after he left the group.

== Early life ==
Nazel was born in Compton, California. He was the son of Joseph "Skippy" Nazel Jr., an African American author and radio talk show host. His musical background came from his mother, a piano teacher and classical musician. His family tried its best to shelter him, sending him to a Catholic school and keeping him busy with football to keep him away from the gangs. The younger Nazel got his first experience with making music at the radio station his father hosted his talk show on; Nazel used the radio station's equipment to put together mixtapes that he would sell at school. Nazel went on to graduate from Junípero Serra High School in nearby Gardena.

== Music career ==
Nazel took the stage name of DJ Prince and started selling mixtapes at school. While working at a petshop at a Lennox California Mall, its owner, Sam Nassif, asked him to DJ a party at a community dance hall. He kept performing there for several weekends and the success persuaded Nassif to invest even more in the place, renaming it "The Cave",(And Later "The Basement") where Nazel would continue to host for over three years and even after his N.W.A days. Nassif also funded DJ Prince's first record, "Strange Life".

He changed his stage name when he was 15 years old at the Skateland USA, the same skating venue credited for launching N.W.A a few years later, due to a fan's suggestion. He said about his name:

I called myself DJ Prince at first; back in the day, I always used to dress like Prince. That was the thing in the early '80s — either you dressed like Prince or you dressed like Michael Jackson. I used to wear the tight parachute pants, and I had the trim moustache, the whole thing. One day I was DJing at a skating rink. I was with Egyptian Lover, that was my boy, still is. This girl comes up to us and asks us our names. And he's like, "I'm Egyptian Lover." And I'm like, "I'm DJ Prince." She looks at me and goes, "I always see you two together. You should call yourself Arabian Prince." And I guess that just stuck.

Arabian Prince started working with Bobby Jimmy & the Critters in 1984. He also produced the hit single and album for J.J. Fad, "Supersonic".

In 1987, he was a founding member of N.W.A, helping with production on some tracks and appearing as a vocalist on "Panic Zone" from N.W.A. and the Posse (1987). He contributed technical work to numerous tracks on Straight Outta Compton (1989). He only rapped on the album's final track "Something 2 Dance 2", a relatively radio-friendly song which was also removed from later pressings of the album due to a dispute. Arabian Prince left N.W.A in January 1989 over royalty and contract disagreements, after N.W.A. briefly toured with Ice-T and Public Enemy, but before the release of Straight Outta Compton. "I started off as a solo artist", he said, "so I was aware of what a royalty statement was. I knew that when these many records were sold, there is a quarterly statement. When you look at it, you can see how much money was paid and then share it. This was not the case. We were also never paid for touring." Eazy-E, Ice Cube and MC Ren remained as the main performers, DJ Yella was the turntablist and Dr. Dre was the main producer.

After leaving N.W.A, Arabian Prince began a solo career. His first album, Brother Arab, was released in 1989 on the EMI major label. The album was a moderate success as it peaked at No. 193 on the Billboard 200 chart, while the lead single "She's Got a Big Posse" was a top-ten hit on Billboard's Hot Rap Songs chart. His second album Where's My Bytches was released in 1993, although it was self-released and not attached to any major labels.

In the mid-2000s, he started releasing music again, with his Professor X project on the Dutch label Clone Records. "I could not release the record under Arabian Prince", he said, "because I already had a single out, so I called myself Professor X on that record." In 2007, he performed as a DJ on the 2K Sports Holiday Bounce Tour with artists from the Stones Throw label. In 2008, Stones Throw released a compilation of his electro-rap material from the 1980s. One of his songs was included on the 2007 video game, College Hoops 2K8.

In 2015, a biopic about N.W.A. titled Straight Outta Compton was released; however, Arabian Prince was not portrayed in the film. Initially, Brandon Lafourche was cast in the role of Arabian Prince. Despite appearing in early photoshoots, the character was cut from the film. The film's director, F. Gary Gray, explained that "It felt like a mistake to focus on someone who wasn't in the group for that long. It was a challenge to narrow ten years down into two hours." After the film's release, Prince said to VladTV: "A lot of the scenes in real life, I was there. I'm just not there in the film, which I'm like, if you're gonna write me out of a movie, shoot some other scenes. Don't write scenes where I was there." Some of the pivotal scenes would be choosing the name for the band, the recording of Straight Outta Compton, and the group's early shows. Arabian Prince also remembered himself as the main opposer to Jerry Heller about the royalties and the money, a role that in the film was instead given to Ice Cube.

The following year, N.W.A. was inducted into the Rock and Roll Hall of Fame, but again, Arabian Prince was not included nor mentioned.

In 2018, Arabian Prince appeared on the AmeriKKKant album of industrial-metal band Ministry. He made a second appearance on Ministry's 2021 album Moral Hygiene.

== Other ventures ==
Aside from his music career, he worked in special effects, 3D animation and video games.

In 2022, he also became the co-founder of MdDAO "to create a 'photo-realistic, digital twin' of the U.S. health-care system."

== Discography ==
=== Solo ===
Albums

- Brother Arab (1989, Orpheus/EMI)
- Where's My Bytches (1993, Da Bozak)

Compilations

- Situation Hot (1990, Macola)
- Innovative Life: The Anthology, 1984–1989 (2008, Stones Throw)

=== Other ===
Bobby Jimmy and the Critters

- Ugly Knuckle Butt (1985, Rapsur)
- Roaches: The Beginning (1986, Macola)
- Back and Proud (1987, Macola)

N.W.A.

- N.W.A. and the Posse (1987, Macola/Priority)
- Straight Outta Compton (1989, Priority)
