= Sounds Orchestral =

British studio-based easy listening group

- Company type: Public company
- Industry: Musical group
- Founded: 1964; United Kingdom
- Founder: John Schroeder; Johnny Pearson
- Headquarters: United Kingdom
- Key people: John Schroeder (founder); Johnny Pearson (founder)

Sounds Orchestral was a British studio-based easy listening group, assembled by John Schroeder with Johnny Pearson in 1964.

== Career ==
John Schroeder had worked with Johnny Pearson previously at Oriole Records, producing Johnny Pearson's first solo album. Moving to Pye, Schroeder was quick to assemble the line-up which would become Sounds Orchestral, intended to be a competitor group to EMI's successful Sounds Incorporated. Johnny Pearson (piano), Kenny Clare (drums and percussion), and Tony Reeves (bassist, who later played with Curved Air) filled out the group. Other members included Peter McGurk on bass, who died in June 1968. McGurk's position was assumed by Frank Clark. Generally in the studio, there would be a trio, backed by other instruments led by Tony Gilbert, who would play violin on many of the tracks. On the second last album in 1975, members had changed to Johnny Pearson on piano, Ronnie Verrell on drums, and Russ Stapleford on bass guitar.

Sounds Orchestral's version of Vince Guaraldi's 1962 instrumental "Cast Your Fate to the Wind" hit No. 1 on the 1–15 May 1965 US Adult Contemporary charts and No. 10 on 8 May 1965 Hot 100. With Sound Orchestral's peak that week, the British Commonwealth came closer than it ever had or would to a clean sweep of a weekly Hot 100's Top 10, lacking only a hit at number two instead of "Count Me In" by the US group Gary Lewis & the Playboys. "Cast Your Fate to the Wind" sold over one million copies and achieved gold disc status. The track peaked at No. 5 in the UK Singles Chart some three months earlier. The follow-up, "Moonglow" (1965) reached No. 43 in the UK. In Canada, "Cast Your Fate to the Wind" reached No. 6 on the CHUM Charts and No. 5 on the RPM AC charts, and "Canadian Sunset" was No. 25 on RPM's Top 40.

Sounds Orchestral made one last original album, in 1977 for K-tel, featuring 20 of the most current and popular television and movie themes. By the close of 1977, Sounds Orchestral had released 16 different record albums, 12 vinyl 7" singles and three vinyl EPs, besides those in the United Kingdom, which had many differently packaged versions of the latter, particularly singles.

Pianist Johnny Pearson is featured on all the Sounds Orchestral albums. When Sounds Orchestral had effectively come to an end in 1977, Pearson had already established a successful solo career on other record labels. He was also music arranger on the UK BBC television programme, Top of the Pops.

At the end of the late 1980s, the CD era arrived. A number of Sounds Orchestral albums were re-released for the first time on compact disc. Most notable was the reissue in 1991, of the fourth 1966 Sounds Orchestral album, Sounds Orchestral Play Favourite Classical Melodies. Retitled Classical Classics, but with eight new tracks by Schroeder and Pearson, the album was dedicated to the memory of Sounds Orchestral members who had died, including McGurk, Clare, and Gilbert. Pearson himself died on 20 March 2011.

== Discography ==
=== Albums ===
- 1964 Cast Your Fate to the Wind (Pye)
- 1965 The Soul of Sounds Orchestral (Pye)
- 1965 Sounds Orchestral Meets James Bond (Pye)
- 1966 Sounds Orchestral Plays Classical Melodies (Pye)
- 1967 Sounds Latin (Pye)
- 1968 Words (Pye)
- 1969 Sounds Like a Million (Pye)
- 1969 Sounds Orchestral Meets Henry Mancini (Pye)
- 1970 Hits Orchestral, Sounds Orchestral (Pye)
- 1970 Good Morning Starshine (Pye)
- 1971 You've Got a Friend (Pye)
- 1971 Wigwam (Pye)
- 1974 The Amazing Grace of Sounds Orchestral (Pye)
- 1974 Clouds (Pye)
- 1975 Love Me for a Reason (Pye)
- 1977 Sounds Orchestral perform 20 Great TV Themes (K-Tel)

In Australia, some of these were released through Astor, the forerunner to Polygram. Some releases were released in New Zealand through Astor, others through Polygram, New Zealand. In Canada and the US, Sounds Orchestral was released through Parkway and easy listening independent record labels. From 1970, see also Johnny Pearson and his Orchestra.

=== Compilation albums ===
- 1968 Portrait in Stereo (Pye)
- 1970 Sounds Orchestral at the Movies (Pye Marble Arch)
- 1970 Golden Hour of Sounds Orchestral, Earth Moon and Sky (Pye Golden Hour)
- 1970 Golden Hour of Sounds Orchestral Vol. 2 (Pye Golden Hour)
- 1970 Reader's Digest Box Set World Record Club (Six album box set UK release) (EMI)

All the above were 12-inch LP vinyl. Cassettes were also issued for the later titles. Some of the above have been repeated on CD. Various releases on CD occur through Castle UK and other labels, starting 1989.

=== Compact disc releases ===
- 1988 The Best of Sounds Orchestral (PRT PYC4011) UK
- 1990 A Golden Hour of Sounds Orchestral (Knight KGHCD136) France – 20 tracks
- 1990 Images (Castle KNCD 16010) UK
- 1991 Classical Classics (Castle CCSCD299) UK (included eight new bonus tracks) UK – 22 tracks
- 1992 The Best of Sounds Orchestral (Castle MATCD225) UK – 24 tracks
- 1995 Cast Your Fate to the Wind (Castle NEMCD 617) UK – reissue of Sounds Orchestral's debut album
- 1997 Sounds Rare (Castle NEMCD 992) UK – Sounds Orchestral 7" Vinyl B-sides
- 2000 Sounds Chartbound (Castle CMAR662) UK
