= Where's My Bytches =

Studio album by Arabian Prince
- Released: 1993
- Recorded: 1993
- Studio: Audio Achievements
- Genre: Gangsta rap
- Label: Da Bozak Records
- Producer: That Guy

Arabian Prince chronology
Situation Hot (1990)	Where's My Bytches (1993)	Innovative Life: The Anthology, 1984–1989 (2008)

Where's My Bytches is the second studio album by Arabian Prince.

== Track listing ==
1. "Where's My Bytches" – 1:24
2. "Ho's 2 Bozak" – 5:52
3. "Where Ya Been Bytch" – 5:18
4. "Gotta Get Some Pussy Quick" – 5:00
5. "Shoulda Stayed in My Bed" – 3:50
6. "2 Ply" – 4:25
7. "Up 2 No Good" – 4:10
8. "Tha Underworld" – 3:28
9. "Treat Ya Like a Ho" – 3:39
10. "Hoochie Momma" – 3:37
11. "Give It up Tonight" – 4:04
12. "A Poem from a Pimp" – 6:01
13. "Sex" – 5:09
14. "A Little Jazz 4 Yo Azz" – 5:43
15. "Outro" – 1:14

== Personnel ==
- Arabian Prince – performer/co-producer
- Paula Brown – backing vocals
- Nanci Fletcher – backing vocals
- Side Show – co-producer/performer
- Mike "Crazy Neck" Simms – guitar
