= Cymande =

British funk band

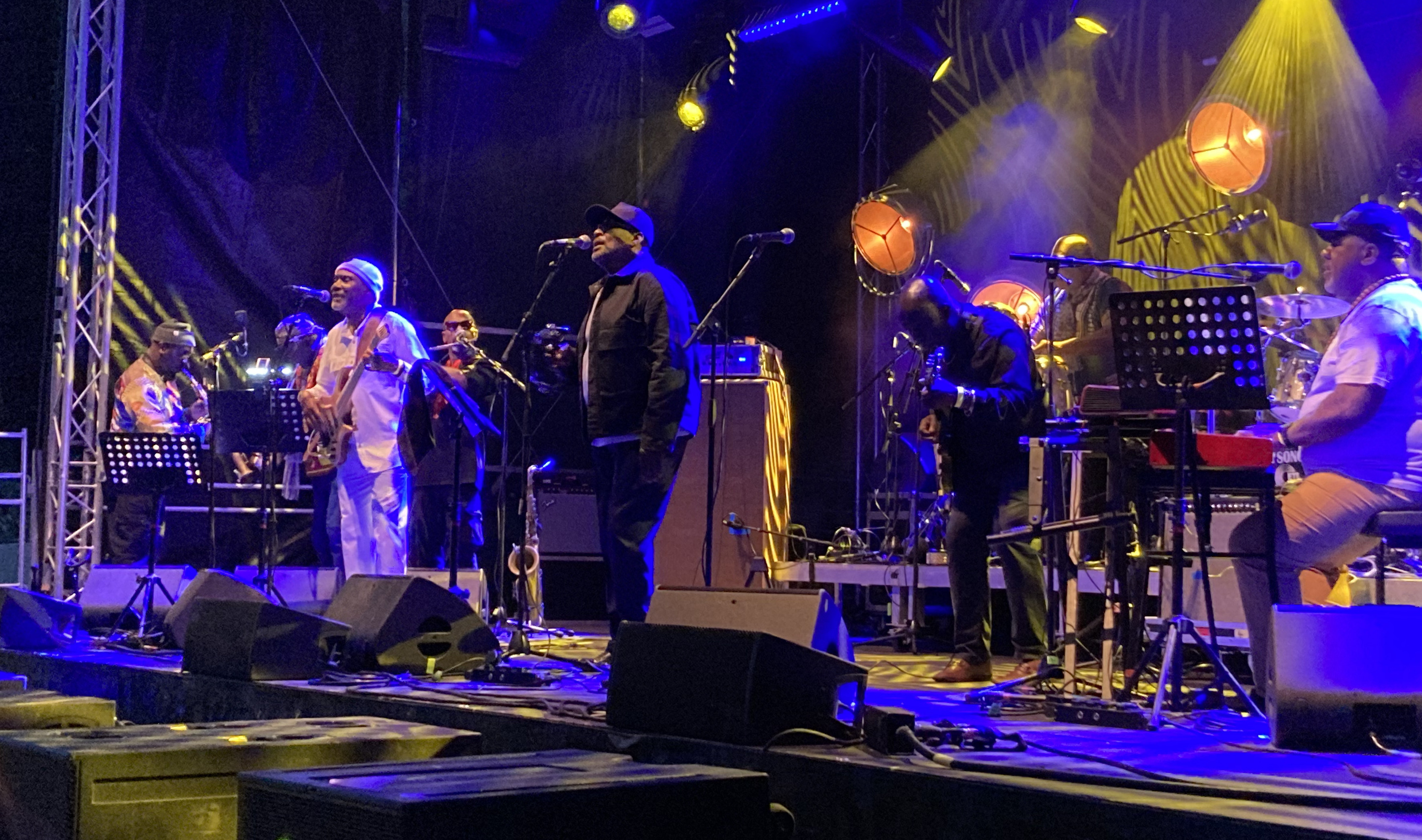
- Cymande performing in Luxembourg City in 2025

Background information
- Origin: London, England
- Genre: Psychedelic funk
- Years active: 1971–1974; 2006; 2012–present
- Labels: Janus Records, Cherry Red Records
- Members: see Members below
- Website: cymandeofficial.com

Cymande (pronounced /sɪˈmɑːndeɪ/ sih-MAHN-day) are a British funk group that was originally active in the early 1970s. The band name derives from a calypso word for "dove", which symbolises peace and love; "Dove" is also the title of one of their best-known songs. With a membership deriving from several Caribbean nations, Cymande were noted for an eclectic mix of funk, soul, reggae, rock, African music, calypso, and jazz that they called "nyah-rock". The band formed in 1971 and released three albums before disbanding in 1974. After gaining newfound popularity when their music was sampled by many notable rap artists, Cymande reformed in the 2010s. Their most recent album Renascence was released in January 2025.

== History ==
=== Original incarnation ===
Cymande was formed by bassist Steve Scipio and guitarist Patrick Patterson in London, England, in 1971. Scipio and Patterson had previously played together in a jazz fusion group called Metre, in which they picked up additional influences from British-Nigerian percussionist Ginger Johnson. Cymande variously had either eight or nine members in their original incarnation and also included singer/percussionist Ray King, saxophonist Derek Gibbs, conga player Pablo Gonsales, singer/percussionist Joey Dee, saxophonist Peter Serreo, drummer Sam Kelly, and flautist/percussionist Mike Rose. All were members of the Afro-Caribbean diaspora community in London, originating in nations including Guyana, Jamaica, and Saint Vincent.

Cymande were discovered by British R&B producer John Schroeder playing in a basement club in Soho in 1971. Schroeder recorded some demos and convinced Janus Records to sign the group. Their first single "The Message" reached the Billboard Hot 100 and Hot R&B charts in the United States. Their self-titled debut album was released in 1972 and also reached the Billboard pop and R&B albums charts in the United States. During this period the group toured the United States successfully; their wide-ranging sound was illustrated by invitations to tour with soul singer Al Green, funk-rock band Mandrill, and jazz musician Ramsey Lewis.

In 1973 they made history as the first British band to headline the Apollo Theater in New York, and they also performed on Soul Train. However, they achieved little notice in their home country. The album Second Time Round, featuring newly politicized lyrics, was released in 1973, and their third album, Promised Heights, was released in 1974. The lack of notice from the British music industry caused the group to break up in 1974. A fourth album, titled Arrival, was recorded during this period but was not released until 1981. After the band split, Scipio and Patterson moved to the Caribbean region to work as lawyers, and Scipio was Attorney General of Anguilla for seven years.

=== Rediscovery and reunions ===
After a period of obscurity, Cymande's music was rediscovered in the 1980s and 1990s. Some of their songs were deconstructed and used as breakbeats by early hip-hop DJs Kool Herc and Grandmaster Flash. The British rare groove scene of the 1980s was openly influenced by Cymande. By the late 1980s they were being sampled regularly by rap artists, starting with De La Soul on the song "Change in Speak" from their 3 Feet High and Rising album, plus EPMD, The KLF, MC Solaar, Heavy D, and many others. An unauthorized sample of "Dove" by The Fugees resulted in a lucrative copyright infringement settlement for Scipio and Patterson. Additional recognition arrived in 1994 when Spike Lee used the Cymande song "Bra" in his film Crooklyn; Lee used the same song in his 2002 film 25th Hour.

Thanks to ongoing recognition of their early 1970s original works by more modern fans, Cymande reformed with most of its original members for a one-off show in 2006. A fuller reunion commenced in 2012. Their original producer John Schroeder was brought back as well, and plans were announced for a new album. The group completed several one-off shows in the next few years, with all nine original members eventually contributing at various times, alongside some new sidemen. Cymande released A Simple Act of Faith in 2015 – the band's first new album in 41 years. In 2016 the group completed a short tour of the United States, where it had not played since 1973.

Early member Trevor White died on 5 November 2020 and original member Pablo Gonsales died in Jamaica on 2 December 2020. Scipio and Patterson continue to reside in Anguilla. In 2022, a documentary film about their story was released, titled Getting It Back: The Story of Cymande, which was later released in February 2024 on a wider cinema release and shortly afterwards on Blu-ray. The album Renascence was released in January 2025, Reviewers complimented the album for returning to the band's classic sounds from their original 1970s incarnation. The group announced 2025 US and European shows to support the release, carrying on with their post-pandemic increase in short tours and festival appearances.Getting It Back: The Story Of Cymande was reshown on BBC 4, on Friday 09 October 2026

== Members ==
=== Original core members ===
- Ray King (vocals, percussion)
- Steve Scipio (bass)
- Patrick Patterson (guitar)
- Derek Gibbs (saxophone)
- Pablo Gonsales (congas)
- Sam Kelly (drums)
- Joey Dee (vocals, percussion)
- Peter Serreo (saxophone)
- Mike "Bami" Rose (woodwinds, percussion)

=== Other early members ===
- Desmond Atwell (saxophone)
- George Kelly (percussion)
- Jimmy Lindsay (vocals, percussion)
- Trevor White (vocals, bass, percussion)

=== 2010s-20s reunion members ===
- Steve Scipio (bass, vocals)
- Patrick Patterson (guitar, vocals)
- Derek Gibbs (alto sax, percussion)
- Pablo Gonsales (percussion, vocals)
- Sam Kelly (drums)
- Desmond Atwell (alto sax)
- Ray Carless (tenor sax)
- Adrian Reid (keyboards, vocals)
- Raymond Simpson (lead vocals)

=== Current members ===
- Steve Scipio (bass, vocals)
- Patrick Patterson (guitar, vocals)
- Richard Bailey (drums)
- Donald Gamble (percussion)
- Tony Kofi (alto sax, soprano sax)
- Denise Baptiste (tenor sax, flute)
- Kevin Davy (trumpet)
- Adrian Reid (keyboards, vocals)
- Raymond Simpson (lead vocals)

== Discography ==
=== Studio ===
- Cymande (1972)
- Second Time Round (1973)
- Promised Heights (1974)
- Arrival (1981)
- A Simple Act of Faith (2015)
- Renascence (2025)

=== Compilations ===
- The Best of Cymande (1991)
- The Message (1999)
- The Soul of Rasta (2000)
- Nyah-Rock (2003)
- Renegades of Funk (2005)

=== Film ===
- Getting It Back: The Story of Cymande (2022) [2024 BD]
