= John Schroeder (musician) =

- Born: John Francis Schroeder; 19 January 1935; London, England
- Died: 31 January 2017 (aged 82)
- Genres: Easy listening, pop
- Occupations: Composer; arranger; record producer; songwriter
- Years active: 1960s–2016
- Website: www.johnschroeder.co.uk

John Francis Schroeder (19 January 1935 – 31 January 2017) was a British pop and easy listening composer, arranger, songwriter and record producer. In 1961, Schroeder won an Ivor Novello Award for co-writing "Walkin' Back to Happiness".

== Life and career ==
Schroeder worked as an A&R assistant to Norrie Paramor at Columbia Records. He was also a songwriter and, with Mike Hawker, wrote the song "Walkin' Back to Happiness", which in a version by Helen Shapiro reached number one in the UK Singles Chart during 1961. Schroeder also co-wrote two other hits for Shapiro, "Don't Treat Me Like a Child", a UK number 3 and "You Don't Know", which also reached number 1 in August 1961.

Later he moved to independent British label, Oriole as A&R chief, and whilst he was there he brokered an early licensing deal with Motown for British distribution on the label. It subsequently issued such singles as The Contours' "Do You Love Me" and "Fingertips" by Little Stevie Wonder.

In the mid 1960s, Schroeder moved to Pye and formed the instrumental pop outfit Sounds Orchestral with Johnny Pearson. They had an international hit with their version of "Cast Your Fate to the Wind", which included reaching No. 5 in the UK chart. With this group as well as under several other names, including his own, he released a large number of easy listening covers of popular songs. While many of these saw little critical acclaim upon release, there was a resurgence in interest in them in the 1990s, when they became popular tracks in London dance clubs, and appeared on soundtracks to films such as the Ocean's Eleven franchise.

During his tenure with Pye, Schroeder oversaw their Piccadilly subsidiary label, producing singles by artists such as Keith & Billie on "Swingin' Tight" and eventually launching the career (after several false starts) of Status Quo, beginning in 1968 with their first hit, "Pictures of Matchstick Men".

In the early 1970s, John Schroeder started Alaska Records, best known for the label's work with Cymande. and produced "Hands Across The Sea", which was one of The Dooleys earliest recordings, written by Ben Findon. In 1971, he appeared with Rick Wakeman, the latter playing as a session pianist, on the Piano Vibrations album. The Alaska label was subsequently joined by another founded by Schroeder, Janus Records. In the early 1980s, John Schroeder moved to Canada, living and working there until the early 1990s. He started Centamark International with Gary Bizzo in Vancouver as consultants to the music industry in 1981.

He later lived in Surrey, England. His autobiography, Sex and Violins was published in 2009. Two years later, Schroeder again became an author, writing and publishing a second book titled, Cozy Cats Cottage plc. This book is unrelated to the music industry and told the story of fictional character Angela Tillsworthy, and how she formed a company employing friendly cats to help the needy. It was published in 2011.

== Death ==
John Schroeder died at his home on 31 January 2017 after a long battle with cancer. He was 82 years old. His funeral took place at Randall's Park Crematorium on 3 March 2017.

== Discography ==
=== Albums ===
- Working in the Soul Mine (Pye, 1966)
- The Dolly Catcher (Piccadilly, 1967)
- Witchi-Tai-To (Pye, 1971)
- You've Made Me So Very Happy (Marble Arch, 1971)
- Piano Vibrations (Pye, 1971)) - With Rick Wakeman on piano.
- Dylan Vibrations (Polydor, 1972)
- Latin Vibrations (Polydor, 1971)
- Love Vibrations (Polydor, 1972)
- Party Dance Vibrations (Polydor, 1972)
- T.V. Vibrations (Polydor, 1972)
- Gangster Movie Vibrations (Polydor, 1972)

=== Singles ===
- "Soul for Sale" (Pye, 1966)
- "The Fugitive Theme" (Piccadilly, 1965)
- "On The Ball (World Cup Theme)" (Pye, 1966)
- "Wanna Thank You Girl" (Pye, 1971)
- "One Way Glass" (Pye, 1971)
- "I'm Gonna Change" (Alaska, 1975)
- "All Night" (Alaska, 1975)

== Publishing ==
- 2009: Sex and Violins – ISBN 1906710643
- 2011: Cozy Cats Cottage plc – ISBN 978-1848767-225
