= Janus Records =

American record label

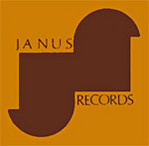
- Parent company: General Recorded Tape
- Founded: July 1969; 57 years ago
- Defunct: 1979
- Genre: Various
- Country of origin: United States
- Location: Los Angeles, California

Janus Records was a record label owned by GRT Records, also known as General Recorded Tape. The label was in operation from 1969 to 1979.

== History ==
Janus was founded in July 1969, as a joint venture of GRT and British label Pye Records. In its early years of operation the bulk of Janus' acts were U.S. issues of Pye product. Its first major hit was "Baby Take Me in Your Arms" by Jefferson, in late 1969. Other acts in Janus' early years included Pye artists Status Quo, Pickettywitch and Sounds Orchestral. Up to the middle 1970s, the label's president was Marv Schlachter, who later ran the ill-fated U.S. Pye label, which by 1977 had evolved into Prelude Records. GRT assumed sole ownership of Janus in 1971, after Pye pulled out of the venture. Ed Dejoy of Baltimore, MD followed Schlachter as president. Allan Mason was vice president in charge of A&R.

Artists who had hits on Janus included Potliquor, Mungo Jerry, The Whispers, Owen B., Cymande, Charlie, Al Stewart, Ian Thomas, Dickie Goodman and Ray Stevens on Barnaby Records. Janus also released Scott English's original recording of "Brandy", which would be covered in 1974 by Barry Manilow as "Mandy". Chess Records was administered as a division of Janus in the early 1970s. Janus also distributed Westbound Records from 1970 until 1975, and Barnaby Records from 1974 to 1979.

In the early 1970s Janus also released American editions of recordings made by Bill Haley & His Comets for the European Sonet Records label (including the 1971 single "A Little Piece at a Time" (Janus 162), which would be Haley's final North American 45 rpm single release). They also released recordings by the British progressive rock band Camel as well as titles by Kayak, Harvey Mandel, Judas Priest, Lucifer's Friend, and the Baker Gurvitz Army.

== See also ==
- List of record labels
