= Cianne Fragione =

Italian abstract artist (born 1952)

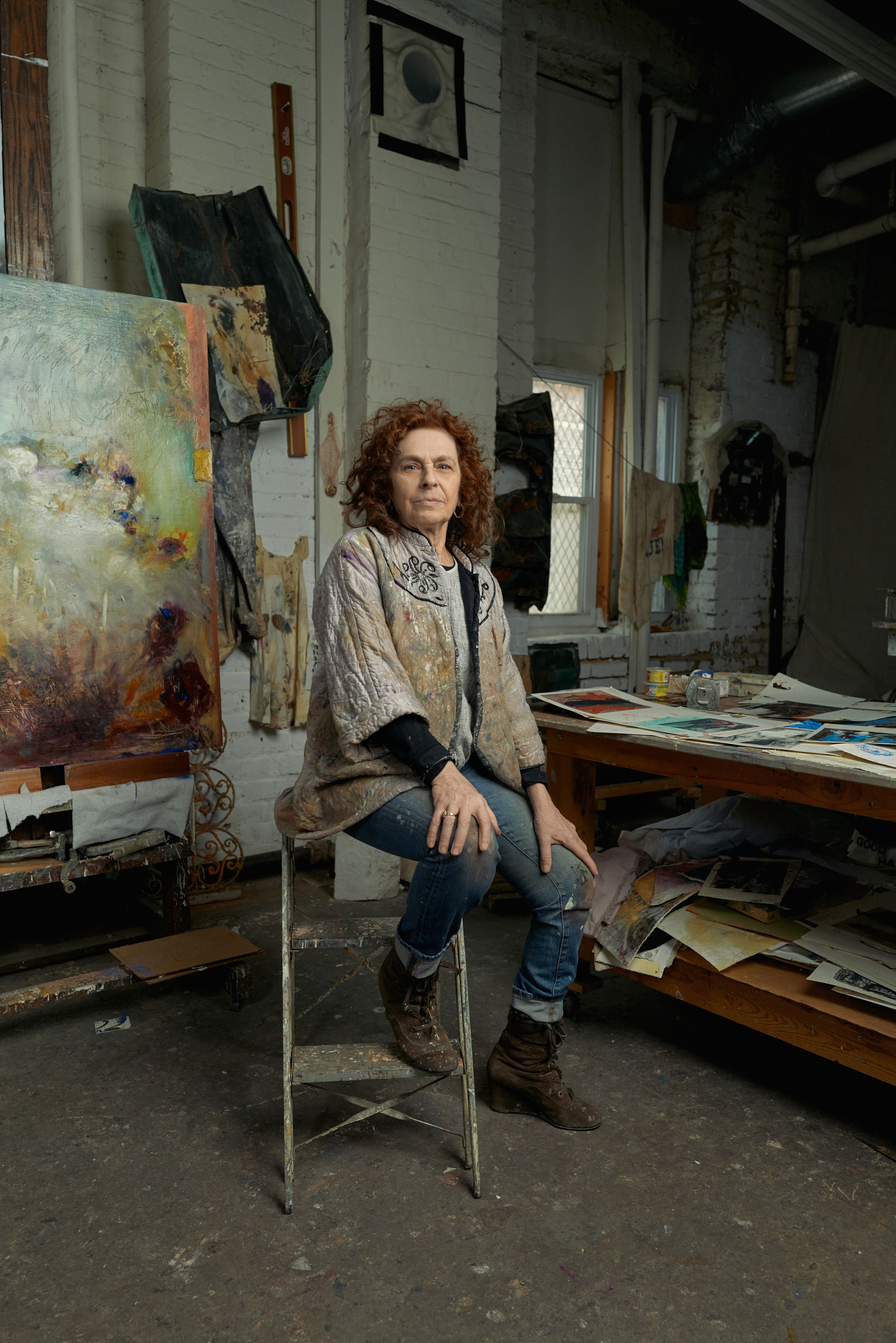
- Born: Cianne Fragione; 1952 (age 72–73); Hartford, Connecticut, U.S.
- Education: Goddard College (BFA); John F. Kennedy University (MFA)

Cianne Fragione (born 1952) is an American-born Italian abstract artist based in Washington, D.C. She is known for her mixed-media works that incorporate found objects and textiles with heavily layered oil paint and collage. She can be found in the permanent collections of the Baltimore Museum of Art, Cecil H. Green Library at Stanford University, and Georgetown College.

== Early life and education ==
Fragione was born in Hartford, Connecticut into a community composed chiefly of Sicilian immigrant families. She grew up in a large multigenerational household; raised by a mother from Turin, Italy and a father from Sicily, she has credited her upbringing for developing an appreciation for the religious culture, symbols, and landscapes of Southern Italy.

Fragione's career in the arts began as a contemporary dancer with P. Stone Dance Company in Hartford, Connecticut and later the Hartford Ballet Company, continuing into other forms of dance, a practice that continues to drive her art: "The artist doesn't explicitly represent dancing, but there's motion in the loose gestures drawn with pencil and crayon or incised into pigment." In 1981 she graduated from Goddard College with a B.F.A. in painting and mixed media. In 1987 she received her M.F.A. in Painting/Mixed Media at John F. Kennedy University Fiberworks Center for the Arts, Berkeley, CA where her artistic advisor/mentor was Jay DeFeo. While at JFK, she was invited to be a guest graduate student at The University of California, Berkeley, where she studied under Brian Wall and Anna Valentina-Murch. As a graduate student she also had tutorials with Manuel Neri at The University of California, Davis and Frank Lobdell at Stanford University.

== Career ==
As Fragione moved from dance to the visual arts, she maintained a sensibility for rhythm and gesture: "The mark, as Fragione understands it, fulfills the way in which, as an artist, she uses her body. It is naturally generative. Creation arises from movement." In 2003, she presented her series of 14 pieces, No Greater Love: Stations of the Cross From a Woman’s Perspective, at the Indianapolis Art Center in a group exhibition on the intersection of religion and politics. Assembling debris from a Catholic church being renovated in Louisville, Kentucky, Fragione reinterpreted the well-known motif of Christ's execution through the eyes of the women who knew him. Her use of old newspapers, vintage textiles, photographs and other fragments frames the narrative as one consisting of personal relationships rather than abstract ideals.

In 2024, Saint Mary's College Museum of Art presented a solo exhibition of mixed-media paintings, drawings, and sculptures titled Isole: A Voyage Among My Dreams. Isole: A Voyage Among My Dreams was shown alongsideVisceral Processes, an exhibition of work by Jay Defeo, Frank Lobdell, and Manuel Neri, artists who mentored Fragione while she was a student in the 1980's. The presentation of the two shows in dialogue with each other testifies to the enduring legacy of the Bay Area Funk movement as exemplified in Fragione's use of found materials, rough surfaces, and torn edges.

In 2025, in a solo exhibition titled What Remains at Nunu Fine Art Gallery in New York, NY, Fragione presented nearly thirty wall-based works of painting, drawing, assemblage, and sculptures, several of which respond to the poetry of Eugenio Montale.

Her work has been exhibited over the US and Italy in numerous independent galleries, as well as in public institutions like the Textile Museum and the Katzen Art Center.

== Style and influences ==
Fragione's work draws from a wide variety of influences from Renaissance artists like Giovanni Bellini, Titian, and Agnolo Bronzino to twentieth-century artists like John Singer Sargent, Cy Twombly and Joan Mitchell. Her interactions with Bay Area artists also imbued her paintings with a strong reliance on gesture and natural color. Fragione is often compared to Twombly due to her use of collage, scrawling lines, fragmented words and inspiration from antiquity, however she maintains that her work is thematically different: "He's older than me, but I came to this by another path," she said in an interview in 2019. Earlier in her career, Fragione switched between painting and assemblage, but since the late 1990's she has developed the two together into a fully idiosyncratic style of labor-intensive paintings with highly textured surfaces. Her piece Reliquary, for example, is a wall-mounted assemblage layered with items that suggest daily life like letters, gloves, beads, ceramic and marble shards, buttons, and coins. Coated with white oil paint, this work exemplifies the synthesis of painting and assemblage to create layers of meaning.

== Exhibitions ==
=== Selected solo exhibitions ===
1981 Artisan Gallery, Paintings, Burlington, VT

1982 Tasha Art Gallery, Paintings, Sonoma, CA

1985 Site-specific installation, Dance in Metal, Walnut Creek, CA

1988 Fiberworks Gallery, Paintings, Berkeley, CA

1992 Gallery Arcade, Recent Paintings, Oakland, CA

1994 Merced County Regional Arts Council Gallery, By Any Other Name, Merced, CA

1995 Instituti Italiano di Cultura, Paintings, San Francisco

1999 Wingspread Gallery, The Lady and the Stone, Northeast Harbor, ME

1999 Swanson Cralle East Market Gallery, Recent Paintings, Louisville, KY 1996 Bradford Gallery, Paintings, San Anselmo, CA

2005 Swanson Contemporary Gallery, Love and Barley, Louisville, KY

2007 Harmony Hall Regional Center, Salute Antonio: A Retrospective, Ft. Washington, MD (catalog)

2012 Saginaw Valley State University Art Gallery, Atmospheric Conditions: Works on Paper, University Center, MI

2013 Gateway Arts Center My Haiku, Brentwood, MD

2016 Anne Wright Wilson Gallery, Pocket Full of Promises, Georgetown College, Georgetown, KY

2017 Gallery Neptune & Brown, Dancing the Tarantella, Washington, DC

Cecelia Coker Bell Gallery, Pocket Full of Promises, Coker College, Hartsville, SC

2019 Gallery Neptune & Brown, Gate to the Sea, Washington, DC

2022 Gallery Neptune & Brown, Songs From My Home, Washington DC

2024 Saint Mary’s College Museum of Art, Isole: A Voyage Among My Dreams, Moraga, CA

2025 Nunu Fine Art Gallery, What Remains, New York, NY

=== Selected group exhibitions ===
1988

Vulcan Studio Gallery, 5th Avenue Group Show Oakland, CA

Reese Pullen Gallery, Humboldt State University, West Coast Works On / Off Paper, Arcata, CA, Jay DeFeo, juror (catalog)

1989

Arts Benicia Gallery, EBMUD Landscapes, Benicia, CA

1991

The Armory Center for the Arts, California Artists’ Books, Pasadena, CA

San Francisco Museum of Modern Art, Gallery at Fort Mason, SF Artists, San Francisco

INTERART Gallery, Group Exhibition, San Francisco

1991 - 1992 Edges and Spaces, exhibition traveled to many sites in California: Reynolds Gallery, University of Pacific; Humboldt Cultural Center; San Jose City College Art Gallery; Napa County Arts Council; Redding Museum & Art Center; Columbia Junior College; Lassen County Art Council; University Art Gallery, California State University, Hayward; Hartnell College, Salinas; Madera County Art Council; and Louden Nelson Center, Santa Cruz

1993

Wiegand Gallery, College of Notre Dame, and Arts Council of San Mateo Art Gallery, Exception to the Rule, Belmont, CA (catalog)

1994

Pacific Center for the Book, Book Works: 7th Biennial Exhibition, San Francisco The Art Club, Oakland Riviera, Oakland, CA

1995

Bradford Gallery, Landscape Under a Foot, San Anselmo, CA

1996

Woman Made Gallery, Experiments in Book Art, Chicago, IL

Crucible Steel Gallery, Mother/Daughters, San Francisco, CA

1998

Spiritual Art Gallery, Renewing the Spirit, Louisville, KY

1999

Spiritual Art Gallery, Beads of Faith, Louisville, KY

2000

Swanson Cralle East Market, Review/Preview, Louisville, KY

Zahorec/Hughes Gallery, Visions VI, Cincinnati, OH

Belknap & Covi Galleries, Hite Art Institute, University of Louisville, Artist/Teacher Invitational, Louisville, KY

Carnegie Center for Art, Ohio Valley Annual, New Albany, IN

Swanson Cralle East Market, Group Exhibition, Louisville, KY

Bellarmine College, Imagination 2000, Louisville, KY

2001

Stacks Gallery, Carnegie Arts Center, Paintings, Leavenworth, KS

Bernheim Arboretum & Research Forest Gallery, Tree of Life, Clermont, KY

Elizabeth Foundation and the National Association of Women Artists, small things considered: A Large Show of Small Works NY, NY (catalog)

2003

US Department of State, Art in Embassies Exhibition, Vilnius, Lithuania, curators: Virginia Shore, Imtiaz Hafiz Indianapolis Art Center, Religion, Spirituality, and the Object, Indianapolis, IN (publication) Attleboro Museum, Inspired by the Land, Attleboro, MA Banana Factory, National Association of Women Artist Annual, Bethlehem, PA

2006

Evolving Art Gallery, Group Exhibition, San Francisco, CA

Art League of Reston, ARTreston, Reston, VA

2009

Hodson Gallery, Hood College, Cianne Fragione and Yumi Hogan, Frederick, MD (catalog)

Hillyer Art Space, Six in the Mix, Washington, DC, curator: Renee Stout

Ridderhof Martin Gallery, University of Mary Washington, The Object: Found, Multiplied, Manipulated, Fredericksburg, VA

Gallery 125, Threads, Trenton, NJ

Harmony Hall Regional Center, Harmony Hall 20 Years: A Retrospective, Fort Washington, MD

2010

Esvelt Gallery, Columbia Basin College, Media Mixed: Four Artists, Pasco, WA

2011

The Textile Museum, Green: The Color and the Cause, Washington, DC, curators: Rebecca Stevens and Lee Talbot

2012

Hope Horn Gallery, University of Scranton Art Museum, Soaring Gardens: Tenth Anniversary Exhibition, Scranton, PA (catalog)

Thompson Gallery, Strange Glue: Collage at 100, Weston, MA (catalog)

Hillyer Art Space, Lo Studio dei Nipoti, Washington, DC, co-curated with Rose Taverniti

Parco Nazonale della Sila, Monastero di Villaggio Mancuso-Taverna, Arte Visiva Per L’Europa, Calabria, Italy

Museo Archeologia & Museo dell’Arte Contadina, Lo Studio dei Nipoti, Monasterace, Calabria, Italy

2012 -2015

US Department of State, Art in Embassies Exhibition, Sofia, Bulgaria, curator: Robert T. Soppelsa (catalog)

2013

John D. Calandra Italian American Institute of Queens College, CUNY, Four Artists Manhattan, NY, NY (catalog)

Associazione di Museo D’Arte Contemporano Italiano, Brushes from around the World, Catanzaro, Italy, Hillyer Art Space, Washington, DC, Advisor Committee group exhibit

2014

MAXgallery; Artscape Gallery Network / Sondheim Dissolution and Transformation, Baltimore, MD Brentwood Art Exchange, Project America, Brentwood, MD, jurors: Dr. Tuliza Fleming, Smithsonian National Museum of African-American History and Culture; Gerald Ross, Maryland Institute College of Art; and Jose Dominguez, Pyramid Atlantic Art Center

2015

Greater Reston Art Center (GRACE), Art Educators: In Practice, Reston, VA, juror: Brett J.Johnson, Director of Workhouse Arts Center, Lorton, VA (publication) Brentwood Art Exchange, 5th Anniversary Exhibition, Brentwood, MD Palazzo Amaduri, International Art, Gioiosa Ionian Reggio Calabria, Italy SunTrust Bank Gallery, Walter Gallery Pop-up, Richmond, VA

2016

Montpelier Art Center, Cianne Fragione and Seth Adelsberger, Laurel, MD

American University Museum, Art Cart: Honoring the Legacy, Washington, DC (catalog)

Gallery Neptune and Brown, Ladies First, Washington, DC

American University Museum, Circle of Friends, in conjunction with Renee Stout: Tales of the Conjure Women, Washington, DC, curator: Jack Rasmussen (catalog)

University of Mary Washington Galleries, Fredericksburg, VA, Mid Atlantic New Painting 2016, curator: Lauren Ross

Smith Center-Joan Hisaoka Healing Art Gallery, Alchemical Vessels, Washington, DC (catalog) Athenaeum, Wings of Chains, Alexandria, VA

2017

McLean Project for the Arts, Strictly Painting II, McLean, VA, curator: Anne Reeve, Glenstone Museum

Dadian Gallery, Wesley Theological Seminary, Making of Things, three-person, Washington, DC, curator: Kiki McGrath

American University Museum, Radix; The Eternal Feminine, three-person, Washington, DC, curator: Claudia Rousseau, Ph.D.

2021

St. Mary College Museum of Art, Aesthetic Forces: Nature in the Modern California Landscape, Moraga, CA, curator, Britt Royer

John Jay College of Criminal Justice, City University of NY, Siva Gallery, NY, NY Weaving Justice, curator, Thalia Vrachopoulos

Via San Rocco 1 Bagnare le rose / Cambiae le cose, Trieste, Italia, curator, José Ramóm Ais

2023

60th Anniversary, Arts In-Embassy Conference on Disarmament, Geneva, Switzerland

Hillyer Art Space, The Oracle Said, Be Still, Washington DC

Strathmore Mansion, Here We Show Again 52 O Street Studio Artists North Bethesda, MD

IA&A at Hillyer. Pulse 2023, Washington DC

2024

Regis College Fine Art Center, Contemporary Art Inspired by the Italian Immigrant Experience, Weston, MA

Wiregrass Museum, B24: Wiregrass Biennial, Dothan, AL

2025

Women Artist of the DMV Survey Show: DC, VA, MD

== Selected collections ==
Fragione's work is held in a variety of collections, private and public, national and international, including: The Baltimore Museum of Art, Baltimore MD, Saint Mary’s College Museum of Art, Moraga, CA Italian American Museum, Washington DC, Art Omi Permanent Collection and Print Collection, DC Commission on the Arts and Humanities Art Bank Selection 2015, Cecil H. Green Library, Department of Special Collections, Stanford University, Stanford CA, Georgetown College Permanent Collection, Georgetown, KY Comune di Monasterace, Calabria, IT.
