= Brian Wall =

British sculptor

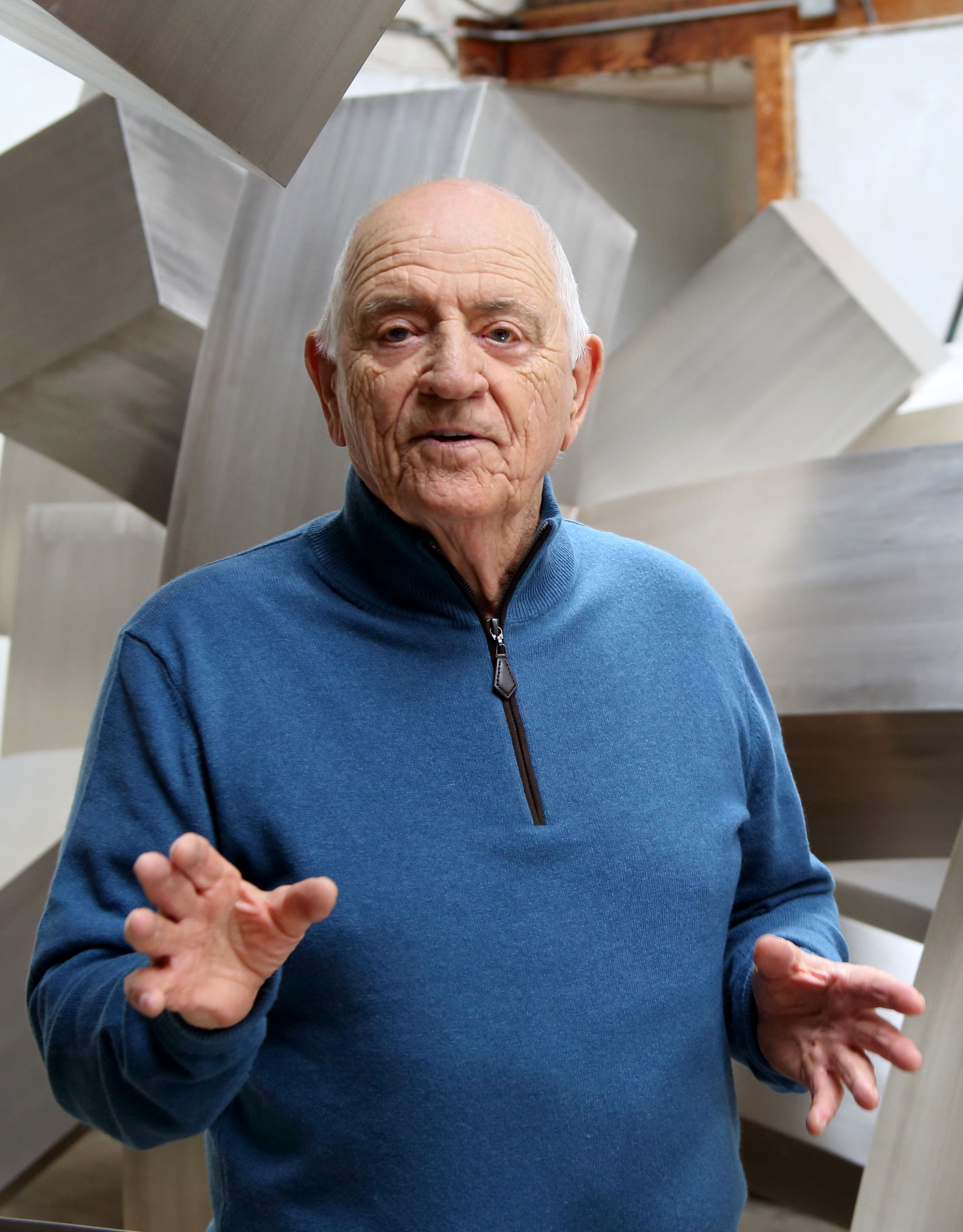
- Born: Brian Wall; September 5, 1931 (age 94); London, England
- Known for: Sculpture
- Movement: Minimalism, Constructivism

Brian Wall is a British-born American sculptor now living in California. His work consists mainly of abstract welded steel constructions, and his career stretches over six decades. He has had numerous solo shows, and his sculptures reside in many private and museum collections. He was a faculty member at the Central School of Art in London, and a professor of art at the University of California, Berkeley.

== Biography ==
Brian Wall was born in Paddington, London, England in 1931; he evacuated to Yorkshire during the London Blitz of World War II. Back in London after the war, he left school at the age of 14 to take a factory job as a glass-blower. He served in the Royal Air Force as an aerial reconnaissance photographer before beginning his career as an artist in 1952, initially as a figurative painter.

He moved to St. Ives, Cornwall in 1954, where there was a thriving artist colony. He worked as an assistant to Barbara Hepworth, a leading Modernist sculptor. He associated with prominent St. Ives artists, including Ben Nicholson, Peter Lanyon, Patrick Heron, and Terry Frost, as well as young contemporaries Trevor Bell and Anthony Benjamin. He was also close to the poet W.S. Graham. Wall joined the Penwith Society of Arts, an organization of artists at St. Ives which promoted their work to the public, becoming secretary. At St. Ives he learned to weld steel, a skill he would use in his art for the rest of his life.

After six years in St. Ives, Wall moved to London in 1960, where he interacted with writers, actors, and artists in the social energy of "swinging London." A piece of his, "Four Elements," appeared in an opening scene of the movie "Blowup". Pete Townshend of the band "The Who" was a student of Wall's at Ealing Art College, and he is included in the seminal book about the London art scene of the ‘60s, “Private View”, 1966, with photographs by Lord Snowden, written by Bryan Robertson and John Russell.

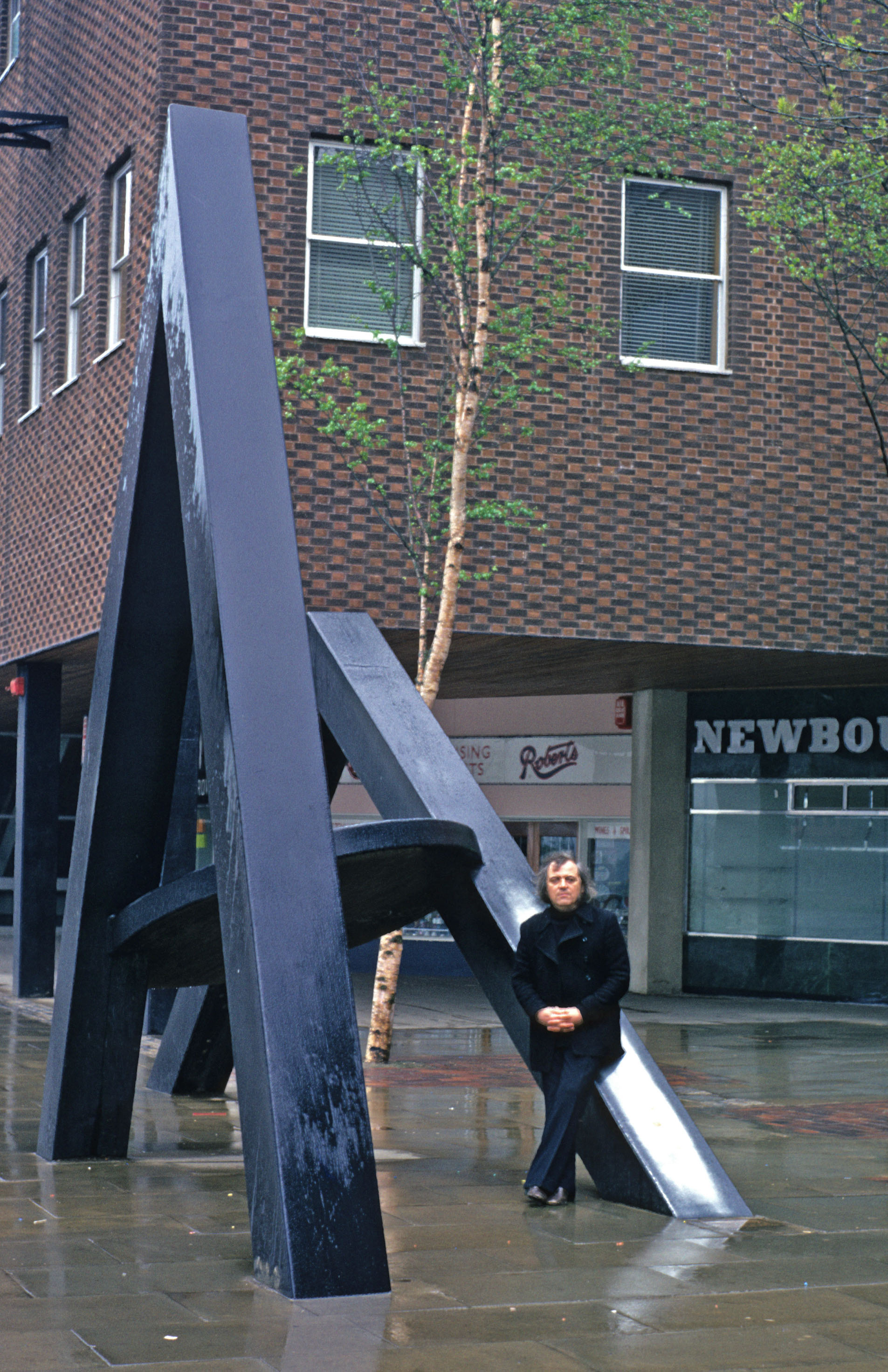
Brian Wall with Thornaby, 1968

Wall continued to refine his work in abstract steel sculptures and began to have his work shown in London galleries and museums, including a solo exhibition at the Grosvenor Gallery, and in the Tate Gallery's show "British Sculpture of the Sixties". In 1962 he became the Head of Sculpture at the Central School of Art in London, and remained there until he emigrated to the U.S.A. in 1972. During that period he met Sylvia Brown, whom he married in 1973. Wall received an important commission to build a monumental sculpture in Thornaby, England, in 1968, the largest sculpture in England at the time. His work appeared in the New British Painting and Sculpture show in London, 1967–68 and at the Arnolfini Gallery in Bristol, England.

Invited in 1969–70 as a visiting professor in the Art Department of the University of California, Berkeley, Wall joined the faculty permanently as professor in 1972, eventually serving as chair of the department; he retired in 1994.

In the 1970s, Wall exhibited in solo shows at Sculpture Now and Max Hutchinson Gallery in New York; San Jose State University, California; University of Nevada, Las Vegas; and Braunstein Quay Gallery, San Francisco. In 1982 a retrospective exhibit appeared at the Seattle Museum of Art and travelled to the San Francisco Museum of Modern Art.

In 1975 Wall and Brown moved from Berkeley to San Francisco, and Wall established a studio in Emeryville, California across the San Francisco Bay in the same year, where he continues to create his sculptures. In 1983 Brian Wall became a U.S. citizen. His newest works comprise stainless steel pieces, still welded into purely abstract forms. These were displayed at a solo show at the de Saisset Museum, Santa Clara University, California in 2015.

In 2014, Wall and Brown founded the Brian Wall Foundation, which benefits working artists in financial need in conjunction with the Pollock-Krasner Foundation.

Wall has been represented by several galleries through the years, including Kasmin Gallery, London; Grosvenor Gallery, London; Flowers in London, Santa Monica, and New York; Sculpture Now and Max Hutchinson Galleries in New York; John Berggruen Gallery, San Francisco; Jernigan Wicker Fine Arts, San Francisco; and Hackett | Mill Gallery, San Francisco.

== Work ==
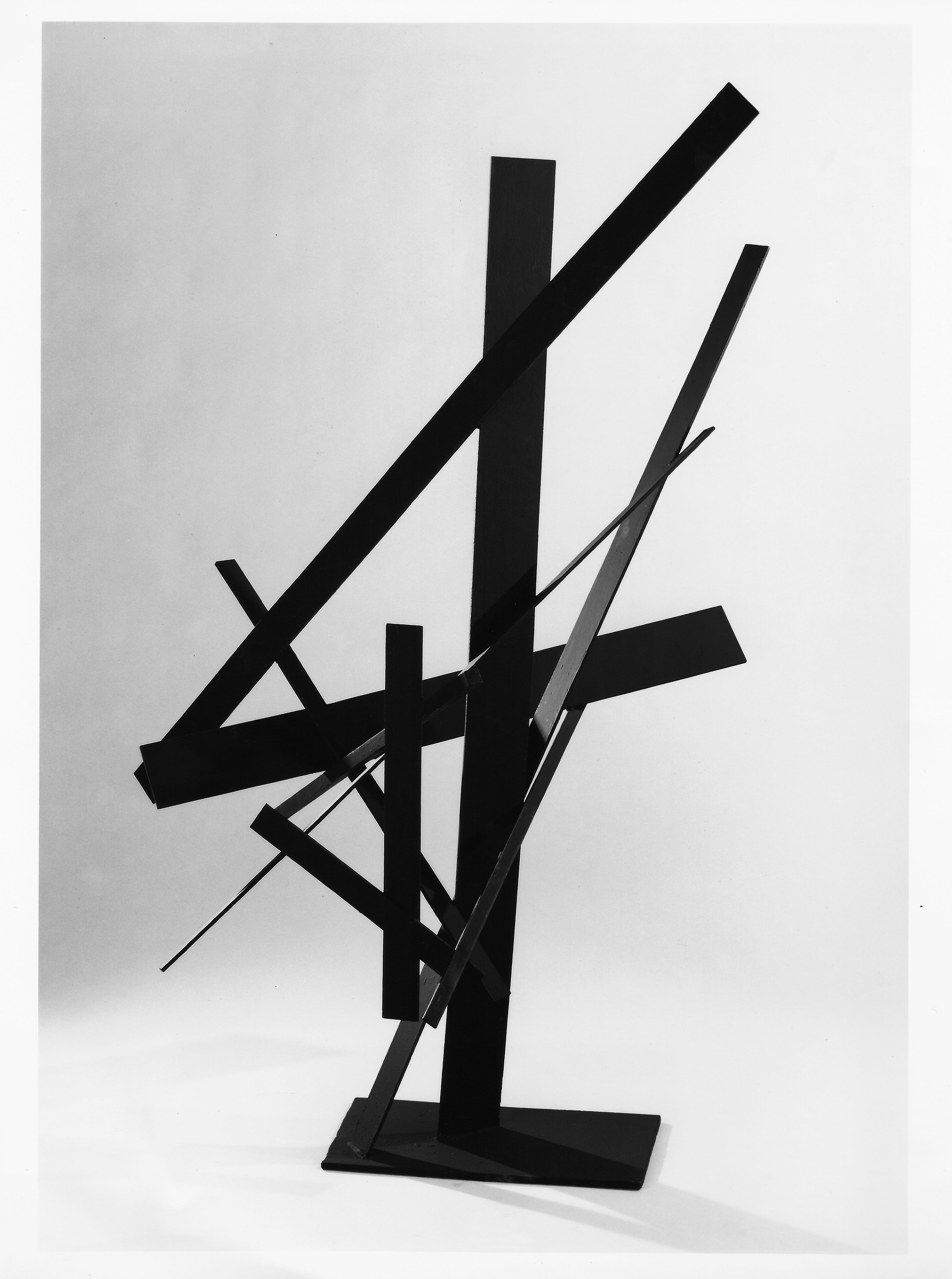
Standing Form XX, 1958

At St. Ives, Brian Wall's work progressed from paintings to reliefs to sculptures. Wall's early sculptures consisted of geometrical wooden constructions, painted in bright primary colors, reminiscent of the work of Piet Mondrian and influenced by the Dutch abstract art movement "de Stijl". Wassily Kandinsky brought a German expressionist influence with the book "Concerning the Spiritual in Art". Wall studied Zen Buddhism, reading " Zen in the Art of Archery" and met the Zen master D.T. Suzuki when he visited St. Ives. Wall was exposed to writers, e.g., James Joyce and George Bernard Shaw; and jazz in this period, all of which influenced his art. He built his own aesthetic, constructing a sculpture as a jazz musician improvises a melody.

By 1956 he had started making abstract welded steel sculptures, one of the earliest British artists to do so. The use of welded steel in sculpture was unusual then, pioneered by Julio González and David Smith. His early work consisted of geometrical pieces of steel, mostly rectangular plates and rods, welded into a whole. As his style evolved, the elements became more freely-placed into a dynamic construction.

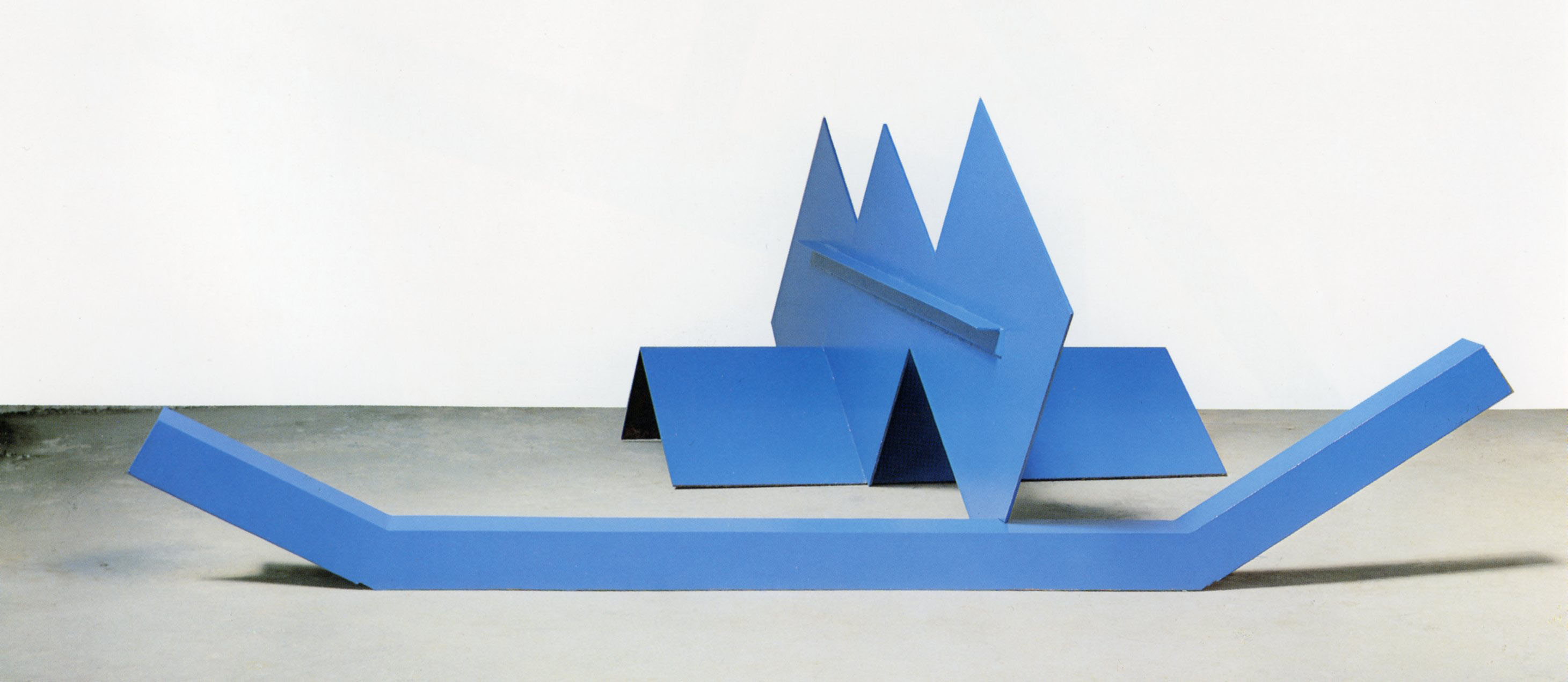
Blue Diamond, 1968

The earliest, small-scale sculptures were constructed of raw or waxed steel, or painted flat black. Over the years he increased the scale of his creations to extend to over 10–15 feet and painted in bright colors, appropriate for outdoor settings, e.g., Blue Diamond, 1968 (156" x 181" x 60"h). His art became simpler, purer, using circles, tubes, squares, etc.

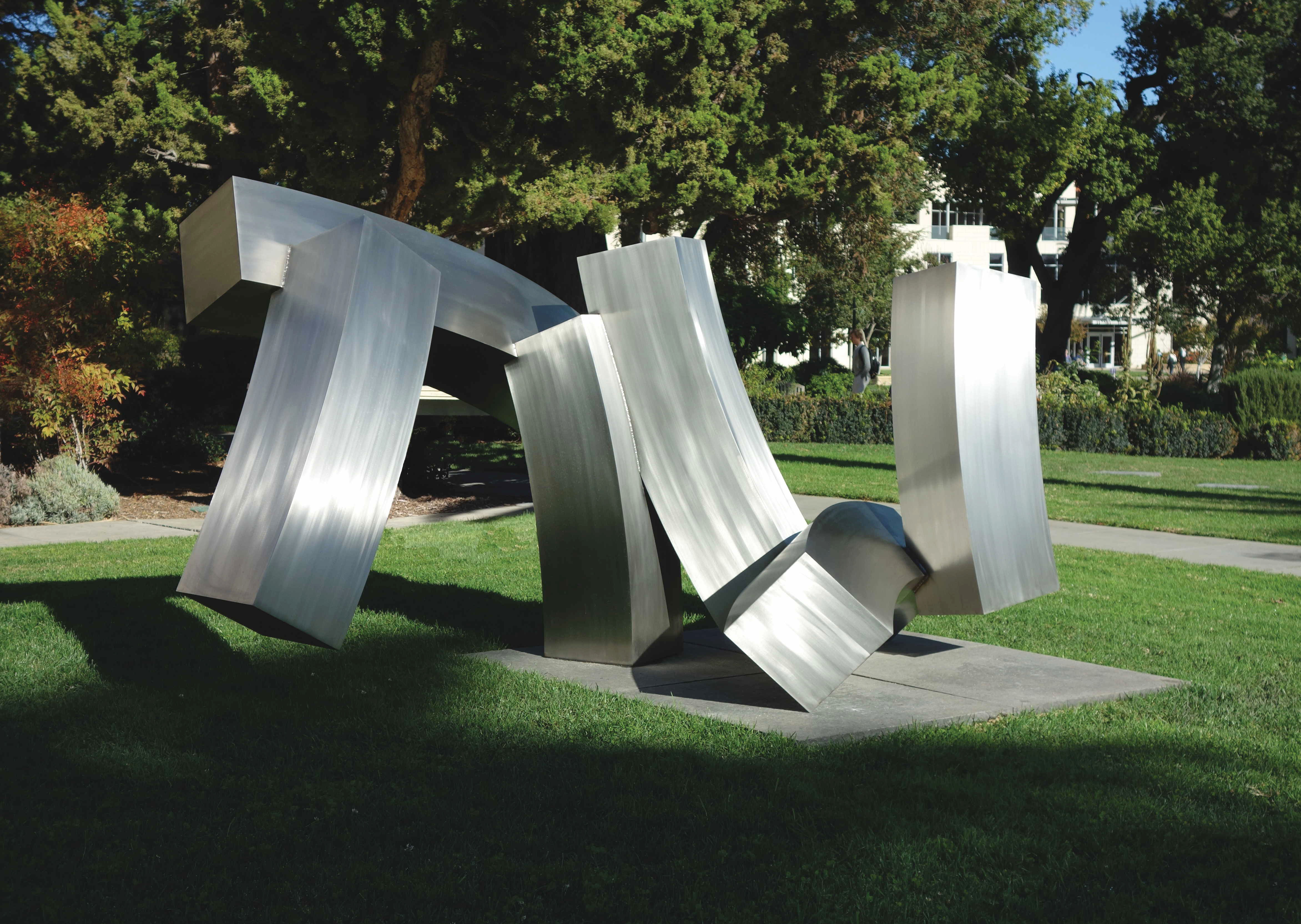
Elegy at de Saisset Museum, 2012

By 2007, Wall had started using stainless steel in his work, in a series titled "Squaring the Circle": stainless steel sheets are cut into strips and welded into four-sided curved elements square in cross-section, each a section of a circle, then welded together into an abstract shape. These range in size from 1/2" thick elements a few inches long, to large pieces whose elements are up to 16" gauge, with the whole sculpture extending over ten or more feet, e.g., Elegy, 2012 (122" x 84" x 63"h).

Throughout his career, Wall's work has been purely abstract, without reference to the outside world, or human figures. They define a space and contain their own elements in an integrated whole. "For me anyway the important breakthrough in contemporary sculpture has been the disappearance of figurative and associative imagery."

Wall has produced drawings throughout his career, and in 1999 on his first visit to Japan, he started drawing in the Japanese calligraphy style, using traditional Japanese materials, e.g., Sumi ink and paper. He also produced mixed-media drawings in the 1990s using oil pastels and acetate on paper, showing abstract colorful patterns.

== Commissions ==
- 1968 "Thornaby" for New Town Center, Thornaby, England
- 1978 "Ali" for College of Technology, University of Houston, Texas
- 1980 "Three Corners" for Towson State University, Baltimore, Maryland

== Selected solo exhibitions ==
- 1957 School of Architecture, London
- 1959 Drian Gallery, London
- 1966 Grosvenor Gallery, London
- 1967 Arnolfini Gallery, Bristol, England
- 1973 San Jose State University Art Gallery, California
- 1974 Quay Gallery, San Francisco
- 1977 Sculpture Now, New York
- 1979 Max Hutchinson Gallery, Houston
- 1982–83 "Brian Wall: Retrospective," Seattle Art Museum and San Francisco Museum of Modern Art, catalog
- 1982 John Berggruen Gallery, San Francisco
- 1987 Simon Lowinsky Gallery, New York
- 1995 “Brian Wall: Lyrical Steel,” Sheldon Memorial Art Gallery, University of Nebraska, catalog
- 1999 Jernigan Wicker Fine Arts, San Francisco, catalog
- 2002 Sculpture, Flowers West, Santa Monica, California
- 2006 New Works, Flowers Gallery, Kingsland Road, London
- 2008 Flowers West, New York
- 2011 Hackett | Mill, San Francisco
- 2011 Flowers Gallery, Cork Street, London
- 2015 “Brian Wall: Squaring the Circle,” de Saisset Museum, Santa Clara University, catalog

== Selected group exhibitions ==
- 1958 "Contemporary British Sculpture," Arts Council, London
- 1961 Second Paris Bienniale, Musee d'Art Moderne, Paris
- 1962 "Joven Escultura Inglesa," Gallery Ateneo, Madrid and Museum of Modern Art, Bilbao
- 1963 "British Art Today," San Francisco Museum of Modern Art; Museum of Contemporary Art, Dallas; Museum of Art, Santa Barbara, catalog
- 1964 "The London Group Jubilee," Tate Gallery, London
- 1965 "British Sculpture in the Sixties," Tate Gallery, London
- 1966 "Fifty Years of Sculpture," Grosvenor Gallery, London
- 1966 “Sculpture in the Open Air” Battersea Park, London, catalog
- 1968 “New British Sculpture and Painting,” UCLA Galleries; University Art Museum, Berkeley; Vancouver Art Gallery, British Columbia; Museum of Contemporary Art, Chicago and others, catalog
- 1969 "Open Air Sculpture," Scottish Arts Council, Edinburgh, Aberdeen and Dundee, catalog
- 1974 "Serra, Wall, Zecher," San Francisco Art Institute, catalog
- 1974 “Public Sculpture/Urban Environment,” Oakland Museum, catalog
- 1979 "Aspects of Abstract," Crocker Art Museum, Sacramento, California, catalog
- 1981 “British Sculpture in the 20th Century 1951–1980,” Whitechapel Art Gallery, London
- 1985 “St. Ives: 1939-64, Tate Gallery, London, catalog
- 1988 "Bay Area Sculpture: Metal, Stone and Wood," Palo Alto Cultural Center, Palo Alto
- 1995 "Abstract British Art: Sculpture,” Flowers East, London
- 1999 Flowers West, Santa Monica
- 2000 Angela Flowers Gallery 30th Anniversary Exhibition, Flowers East, London; Flowers West, Santa Monica
- 2002 "Transition: The London Art Scene in the ‘50s,” Barbican Art Galleries, London, catalog
- 2004 "A Minimal Future? Art as Object 1958–1968," Museum of Contemporary Art, Los Angeles
- 2005 35 Years of Angela Flowers Gallery, Flowers East, London
- 2006 New Works by Gallery Sculptors, Flowers Central, London
- 2010 40 Years On, Flowers Gallery, Kingsland Road, London
- 2010 Modern Masters, Flowers Gallery, Cork Street, London
- 2012 “Concrete Parallels,” Centro Brasileiro Britânico Gallery, São Paulo, Brazil
- 2012 British Sculpture, Caro, King, Mitchell, Paolozzi, Sandle, Wall, Flowers Gallery, Cork Street, London
- 2016 The Best of Decades: Painting and Sculpture of the 1960s from the Collection, Dublin City Gallery The Hugh Lane, Dublin
- 2017 City Sculpture Projects 1972, Henry Moore Institute, Leeds, UK
- 2017 Modern Art and St Ives: Construction in Painting and Sculpture after 1950, Tate St Ives, Cornwall, UK
- 2019 “A Life with Art: Gifts from Dwight and Sue Emanuelson,” Columbia Museum of Art, South Carolina

== Selected public collections ==
- Art Gallery of New South Wales, Sydney, Australia
- Arts Council of Great Britain
- Berkeley Art Museum and Pacific Film Archive, California
- British Council, London
- Columbia Museum of Art, South Carolina
- Crocker Art Museum, Sacramento, California
- de Saisset Museum, Santa Clara University, California
- Fitzwilliam Museum, University of Cambridge, England
- Manchester Art Gallery, England
- National Gallery of Art, Washington, D.C., Herb and Dorothy Vogel Collection
- Oakland Museum of California
- Penwith Society, St. Ives, Cornwall, England
- Rhode Island School of Design Museum, Providence, Rhode Island
- Sheldon Museum of Art, Lincoln, Nebraska
- Tate, London

== See also ==
- List of St. Ives artists
