= 2000 in architecture =

The year 2000 in architecture involved some significant architectural events and new buildings.

== Events ==
- June 22 – The Architect company Snøhetta wins the international Architect competition for Oslo's New National Opera House.
- Holy Trinity Column in Olomouc is inscribed on the UNESCO World Heritage List.
- Greenwich Millennium Village in London designed by Ralph Erskine.

== Buildings and structures ==
=== Buildings opened ===
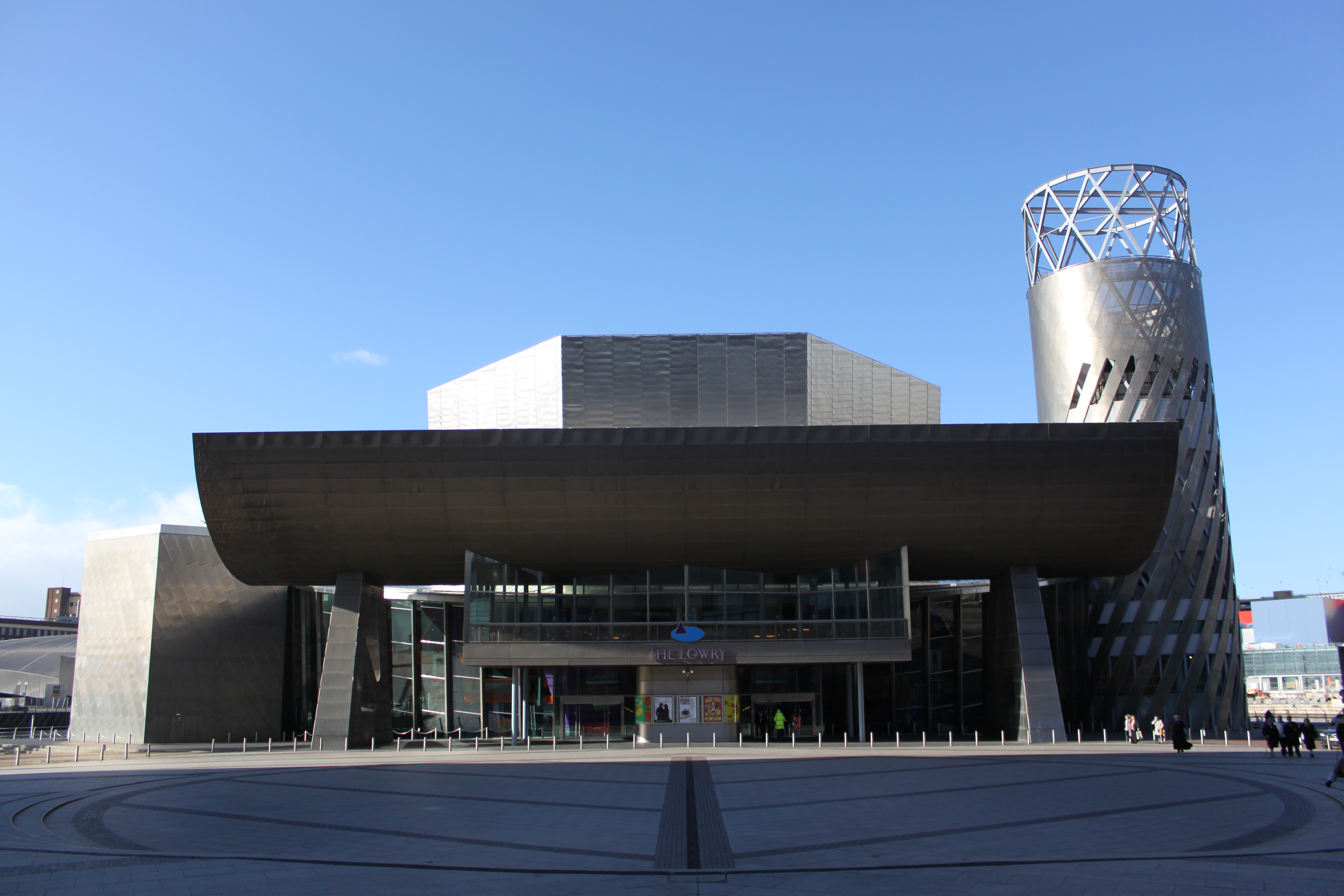
The Lowry theatre and gallery centre in Salford, England

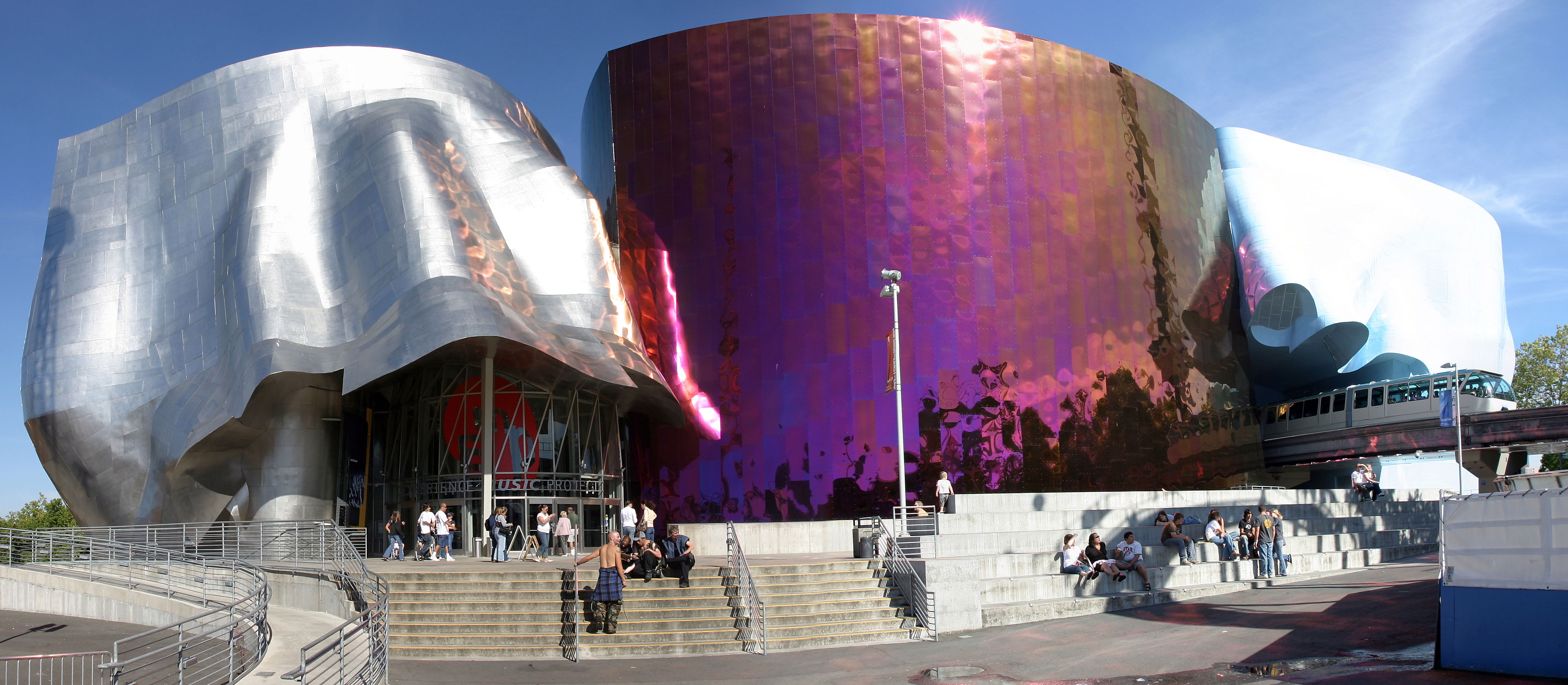
Museum of Pop Culture in Seattle

- February 19 – Rose Center for Earth and Space in New York City, USA, designed by Polshek Partnership Architects.
- March 8 – Peckham Library in London, UK, designed by Alsop and Störmer. It wins this year's Stirling Prize.
- May 12 – Tate Modern in London, a conversion of Bankside Power Station by Herzog & de Meuron.
- October 12 – The Lowry theatre and gallery centre in Salford, England, designed by Michael Wilford and Buro Happold.
- August – Centro Brasileiro Britânico in São Paulo, designed by Marc Rubin.
- August 19 – Cathedral of Christ the Saviour in Moscow, Russia, reconstructed to Konstantin Thon's 1832 design, is dedicated.
- October 25 – Judenplatz Holocaust Memorial unveiled in Vienna, designed by Rachel Whiteread.
- November 13 – Museu de les Ciències Príncipe Felipe in Valencia, Spain, with façade designed by Santiago Calatrava.
- December 6 – Queen Elizabeth II Great Court in the British Museum, London, UK.
- date unknown
  - Emirates Towers in Dubai, United Arab Emirates.
  - Sony Center, Potsdamer Platz in Berlin, Germany, designed by Helmut Jahn.
  - Diamond Ranch High School in Pomona, California, USA, designed by Thom Mayne of Morphosis.
  - Museum of Pop Culture in Seattle, USA, designed by Frank Gehry.
  - Sibelius Hall in Lahti, Finland, designed by Kimmo Lintula and Hannu Tikka.

=== Buildings completed ===
- May 14 – Al Faisaliyah Center in Riyadh, Saudi Arabia, designed by Foster and Partners, the first building to be completed in a competition between two Saudi princes; the Kingdom Centre is completed in 2002.
- Bankers Hall West in Calgary, Alberta, designed by Cohos Evamy.
- Montevetro (apartments), Battersea Reach, London, designed by Richard Rogers Partnership.

== Awards ==
- AIA Gold Medal – Ricardo Legorreta
- Architecture Firm Award – Gensler
- Emporis Skyscraper Award – Sofitel New York Hotel
- Grand Prix de l'urbanisme – Alexandre Chemetoff
- Praemium Imperiale Architecture Laureate – Richard Rogers
- Pritzker Prize – Rem Koolhaas
- Prix de l'Équerre d'Argent – Philippe Gazeau
- RAIA Gold Medal – John Morphett
- RIBA Royal Gold Medal – Frank Gehry
- Stirling Prize – Alsop & Störmer for Peckham Library, London
- Thomas Jefferson Medal in Architecture – Daniel Patrick Moynihan
- Twenty-five Year Award – The Smith House
- Vincent Scully Prize – Jane Jacobs

== Deaths ==
- January 18 – Margarete Schütte-Lihotzky, Austrian architect in the Nazi Resistance movement (born 1897)
- February 19 – Friedensreich Hundertwasser, Austrian artist and architect (born 1928)
- July 3 – Enric Miralles, Spanish architect (born 1955)
- July 29 – Eladio Dieste, Uruguayan engineer and architect (born 1917)

== See also ==
- Timeline of architecture
