= Ealing Art College =

Former education institute in London, England

Coordinates: 51.5064°N 0.3052°W

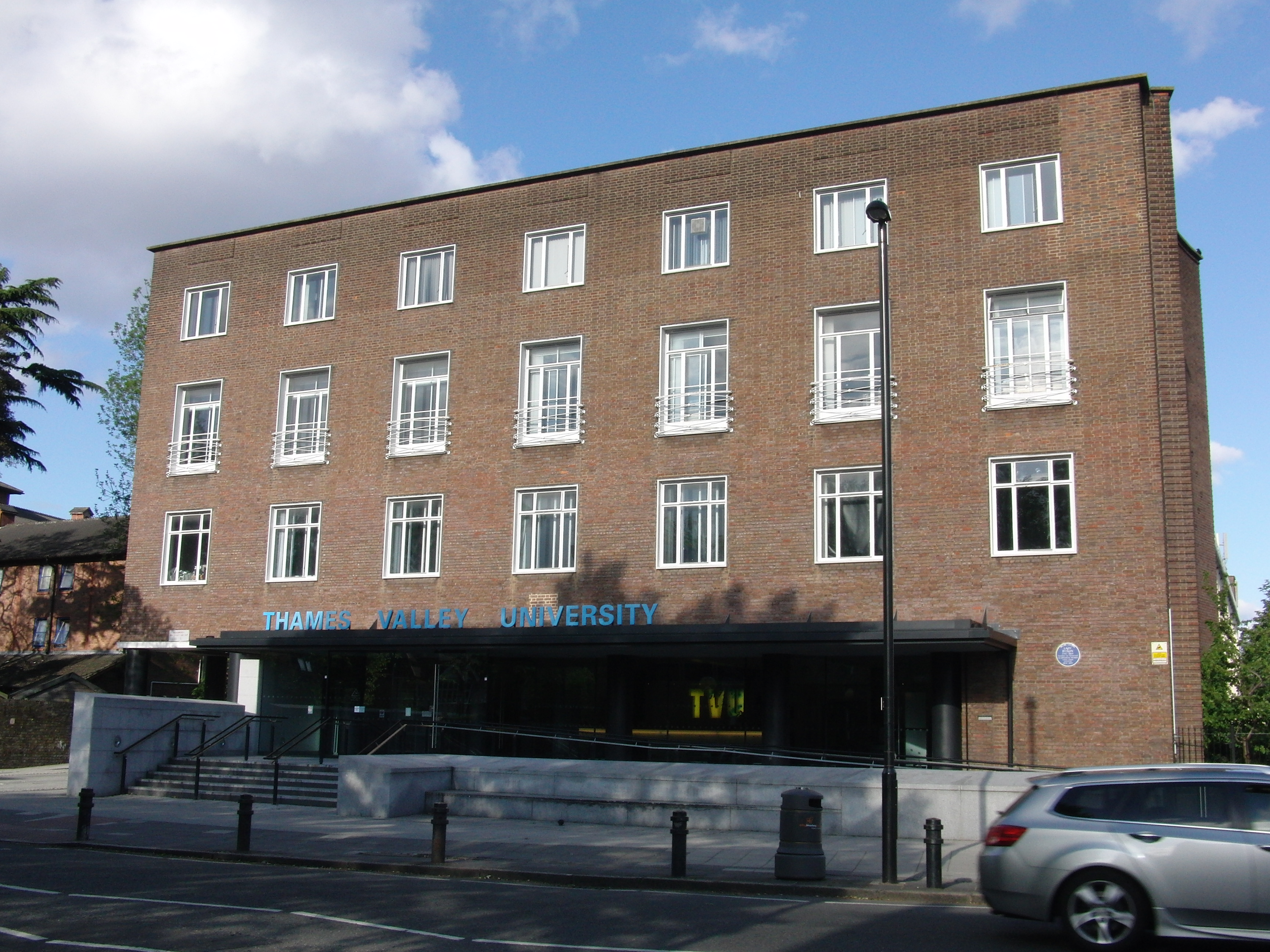
The site today on St Mary's Road forms the Ealing campus for the University of West London.

Ealing Art College (or Ealing Technical College & School of Art) was a further education institution on St Mary's Road, Ealing, London, England. The site today is the Ealing campus of University of West London.

== History ==
In the early 1960s the School of Art was composed of Fashion, Graphics, Industrial Design, Photography and Fine Art Departments, and the college was attended by notable musicians Freddie Mercury, Ronnie Wood, and Pete Townshend, and Oscar-winning illustrator Alan Lee.

The College offered External London University courses in the 1960s. The BA degree and BSc Economics with specialisation in various components like Geography, Economics and Law, attracted many British and foreign students, and also lecturers from various London University Colleges.

There was also a School of Liberal Arts that offered secretarial and undergraduate language courses in French, Spanish, German and Russian and included a semester at L'ecole d'interpretes, University of Geneva. It was considered revolutionary at the time.

The two-year Groundcourse was held in the annexe to the Art School. The "Groundcourse" was a radical and influential experiment in art education, led by Roy Ascott with a team of artists including R B Kitaj and Anthony Benjamin. For a few years in the 1970s, the college had a separate campus at Woodlands Avenue, Acton, where the Schools of Librarianship and Management were based.

== Notable alumni ==
=== Artists ===
- Fiona Adams - photographer who took the 'Jumping Beatles' picture John Lennon chose for the cover of their EP Twist and Shout (1963)
- Vic Duppa-Whyte – paper engineer, pop-up books creator
- Michael English – psychedelic artist-musician with Hapshash and the Coloured Coat
- Gideon Gechtman – Israeli artist and sculptor
- Alan Lee – illustrator who won an Academy Award for The Lord of the Rings: The Return of the King (2003)
- Arthur Ted Powell – advertising art director and artist
- Tim Staffell – visual artist, model maker, and lead singer of Smile, precursor band to Queen
- Barbara Tate – artist and author
- Stephen Willats - artist
- Carolyn Jane Manthey - sculptor, artist and puppeteer. Created the sculptural facade facing Warwick Road, depicting six figures in ciment fondu, symbolising catering. (1962)

=== Musicians ===
- Freddie Mercury – lead singer of Queen
- Roger Ruskin Spear – multi-instrumentalist in the Bonzo Dog Doo-Dah Band
- Pete Townshend – guitarist of the Who
- Ronnie Wood – guitarist of the Jeff Beck Group, Faces, and the Rolling Stones

=== Writers and journalists ===
- Michael Lawrence – author of many books for children and young adults
- Michael Molloy – ex-editor of the Daily Mirror and Sunday Mirror
- Robert Rankin – best-selling author, illustrator and sculptor
- John Van der Kiste – author (his novel Always There is based partly on his student days at Ealing)
