= Fiona Adams =

British photographer (1935–2020)

- Adams in 1967.
- Born: Fiona Clarke; 26 September 1935; London, England
- Died: 26 June 2020 (aged 84); Guernsey
- Known for: Photographer of 1960s London

Fiona Rose Pattinson Adams (née Clarke; 26 September 1935 – 26 June 2020) was a British photographer. She is most well known for her photograph of the Beatles jumping in the air which featured on the Twist and Shout EP cover. In the 1960s, she photographed musicians of the day including Jimi Hendrix, Billy Fury, Cilla Black, Adam Faith, Bob Dylan and Sandie Shaw.

== Early life ==
Adams was born on 26 September 1935 in London, daughter of Freda (née Pattinson) and Philip Clarke, both professional musicians.

The family ran a guest house in Vazon in the Channel Island of Guernsey. Due to World War Two in 1941, the family left Guernsey and returned in 1946. Adams attended The Ladies College in St Peter Port. She studied photography at the Ealing School of Art, graduating in 1955.

== Career ==
Adams worked for photographer Douglas Glass for 7 months after graduating. This was followed by a role as photographer assistant in London County Council's architectural department for four years. After working in Australia for two years, she returned to England in 1961. Adams was briefly married in Australia.

As a temp job she began photographing pop and cultural celebrities for Boyfriend magazine and, a year later, worked at Fabulous magazine. In 1967, she began photographing for American Express.

== Later life ==
Adams married Owen Le Tissier in 1972. They had two children.

She returned to Guernsey in the 1980s, and continued to work as a professional photographer.

The 2009–2010 National Portrait Gallery exhibition Beatles to Bowie: the 60s Exposed included work by Adams.

Owen died in 2011. She died in Guernsey in June 2020.
