= Twist and Shout (EP) =

1963 EP by the Beatles

EP by the Beatles
- Released: 12 July 1963
- Recorded: 11 February 1963
- Studios: EMI, London
- Length: 8:32
- Label: Parlophone
- Producer: George Martin

The Beatles EP chronology
Twist and Shout (1963)	The Beatles' Hits (1963)

Twist and Shout is the debut extended play by the English rock band the Beatles, released in the United Kingdom through EMI's Parlophone label on 12 July 1963. It contains four tracks produced by George Martin that were previously released on the band's debut studio album, Please Please Me (1963). Rush-released to meet public appetite, the record topped the UK EP chart for twenty-one weeks, the best-selling EP of all time in the United Kingdom up to that point, and appeared on the NME Singles Chart, peaking at number four. It was certified silver in the United Kingdom in August 1963. The EP's cover photograph, taken by Fiona Adams, features the Beatles jumping in a London bombsite. It has been described by The Telegraph as "one of the key images of the 1960s".

== Background and content ==
"Twist and Shout", written by Phil Medley and Bert Berns and first recorded by R&B vocal group the Top Notes, typically closed the Beatles' set during their 1963 tour of Great Britain with Roy Orbison. The band based their version of the twist song on the version by the Isley Brothers recording. According to Alan Smith of NME, "Twist and Shout" became "almost a Beatles' show-stopper", stating it was one of their highlights at the 1963 NME Poll Concert.

After the Beatles included "Twist and Shout" as the last track on their debut album Please Please Me (1963), EMI received a deluge of requests for its issue as a single. British record shops were reported to be similarly "besieged" by customers asking for the song. The popularity of the Beatles version of the song boosted British sales of the earlier Isley Brothers recording that inspired it, first released in the United Kingdom in May 1962 and led to the release of a version by Brian Poole and the Tremeloes on Decca. (Note: According to Peter Blackman of the Evening Sentinel, the increased sales of the Isleys' "Twist and Shout", previously unsuccessful in the United Kingdom, demonstrated "just how easily the public can be manipulated".) The Beatles and producer George Martin did not consider "Twist and Shout" single material; they were opposed to lifting songs off Please Please Me, since Paul McCartney believed it "a bit too off-beat to be commercial" and Lennon was concerned about how often he would have to sing it.

In a compromise to meet demand, EMI commissioned the Twist and Shout EP as a "special release". Side one of the EP features the title track and "A Taste of Honey", a Broadway song written by Bobby Scott and Ric Marlow that was first recorded in a vocal version by Billy Dee Williams in 1961. Side two contains two Lennon–McCartney originals, "Do You Want to Know a Secret" and "There's a Place". All four tracks were recorded on 11 February 1963, in sessions that resulted in the bulk of the Please Please Me album. The EP was produced by Martin.

== Packaging ==
The sleeve photograph, described by The Telegraph as "one of the key images of the 1960s, seeming to promise a new era in which youthful energy and vitality would triumph over drab postwar austerity", shows the Beatles jumping in the air at a bombsite off Euston Road, London. It was taken by Fiona Adams, a young photographer described by Colin Smith of The Guardian as keen to "get away from studio shots and stage sets". The photo was taken on Adams' camera on 18 April 1963. (Note: Smith deems the camera model as a Rolleiflex, while Piers Hemmingsen claims it was a Pentax.) (Note: Similar "jump" photographs of the Beatles were taken by Dežo Hoffmann in Liverpool the same month.) The shot was featured in Boyfriend magazine before it was chosen for the EP. Adams went uncredited on the packaging. In 2009, the photograph was included in the National Portrait Gallery's exhibition Beatles to Bowie: The 60s Exposed; curator Terence Pepper described it as "one of the defining images of 20th-century culture". Liner notes were provided by Tony Barrow, who wrote that the EP presents "four contrasting facets of the quartet's vocal and instrumental ingenuity".

== Release and commercial performance ==
EMI's Parlophone label released Twist and Shout in the United Kingdom on 12 July 1963. (Note: Catalogue number GEP 8882.) It topped the national EP chart compiled by Record Retailer, and ultimately spent 64 weeks on the British charts. It was certified silver for selling more than 250,000 copies on 13 August 1963, having become the biggest-selling EP of all time up to that point in the United Kingdom. It later sold over 650,000 copies. Despite being more expensive than a single, the EP was so successful that it became the first EP to enter the top ten of the NME Singles Chart, peaking at number four. Two more EPs, The Beatles' Hits and The Beatles (No. 1), were released in September and November 1963. The Twist and Shout EP was reissued as part of The Beatles EP Collection vinyl box set in 1981; with the box set receiving a CD release in 1992.

== Critical reception ==
Professional ratings
Review scores
Source	Rating
AllMusic	4/5 stars

Barrow, writing under his pseudonym Disker in the Liverpool Echo, considered "A Taste of Honey" the EP's highspot. An anonymous writer in the Coventry Standard called it "a worthwhile mini-album", while Gerry G. of the Pontypridd and Llantrisant Observer believed that had the Beatles released a single of "Twist and Shout" two months earlier instead, it "would have been better policy and a certain chart topper". In a retrospective review, Bruce Eder of AllMusic described the record as "pretty daring as a summary of highlights from their debut album", citing the "uncommonly raw rock & roll" title track. Eder considered the Beatles' EPs "more substantial as artifacts of their British output than most EPs were for most other bands" and highlighted the "excellent cover art, with superb photos of the group and actual notes on the back, like an LP".

The EP was the first record Elvis Costello bought with his own money, while Steven Severin of British rock band Siouxsie and the Banshees described it as "the first time any kind of pop music got into my consciousness". The packaging of the 1982 Genesis EP 3X3 pastiches the Twist and Shout EP, and features liner notes by Barrow.

== Track listing ==
Side one
No.	Title	Writer(s)	Lead singer	Length
1.	"Twist and Shout"	Bert Russell, Phil Medley	John Lennon	2:33
2.	"A Taste of Honey"	Ric Marlow, Bobby Scott	Paul McCartney	2:05
Total length:				4:38

Side two
No.	Title	Writer(s)	Lead singer	Length
1.	"Do You Want to Know a Secret"	John Lennon, Paul McCartney	George Harrison	2:00
2.	"There's a Place"	Lennon, McCartney	John Lennon and Paul McCartney	1:53
Total length:				3:53
