= Peter Davies (artist) =

Scottish artist (born 1970)

- Born: 1970 (age 55–56); Edinburgh, Scotland
- Occupation: Artist

Peter Davies (born 1970) is a Scottish artist based in London.

Davies at the Royal Academy of Art in London, Centro Brasileiro Britânico in São Paulo, Saatchi Gallery in London, Kunsthallen Brandts Klaedefabrik in Denmark and ICA in London. Davies won the John Moores Painting Prize in 2002.

His work is held in the collection of the Tate Gallery.
