= Barbara Tate =

English painter

Barbara Tate in 2009

Barbara Tate (2 June 1927 – 12 November 2009) was a British artist and writer, perhaps best known for her bestselling book West End Girls, which was published shortly after her death.

== Career in Art ==
Born in Uxbridge as Barbara June Peddle, her father Charles Jonathan Peddle (1895-1961) was a carpenter and lorry-driver. A violent man, he once tied a noose around her neck when she was aged 3 and balanced her on her toes until she was rescued hours later when her mother came home. Abandoned soon after by her mother Elsie Irene, née Williams (1904–1973), she was brought up by her maternal grandparents. In 1941 aged 14 she won a scholarship to Ealing School of Art.

In 1972 Tate became a member of the Society of Women Artists (SWA). She was the organisation's President from 1985 to 2000 and later became an Honorary President. The SWA bestows the Barbara Tate Award annually in her memory. Her paintings were awarded gold and silver medals from the Paris Salon and the Grand Prix de la Cote d'Azur. She was also a member of the Society of Botanical Artists and the Royal Society of British Artists. In 1993 she was appointed an Honorary Professor of Thames Valley University. She married fellow artist James Tate in 1951 and had one daughter.

== West End Girls ==
Her book West End Girls (2010) outlined her life as maid from 1948 to 1950 to Fayn Nicholson (1918-1977) ('Mae Roberts' in the book), a prostitute in London's then notorious Soho district. Nicholson/Roberts was murdered by being burned to death in her London flat in 1977. The manuscript was actually completed in 1977 but Tate withheld publication for 32 years believing her former occupation might embarrass her family. The book became The Times Bestseller. In 2012 it was also adapted into the play West End Girls by Circa Theatre in New Zealand.
