= Extended play =

Musical recording shorter than a full album

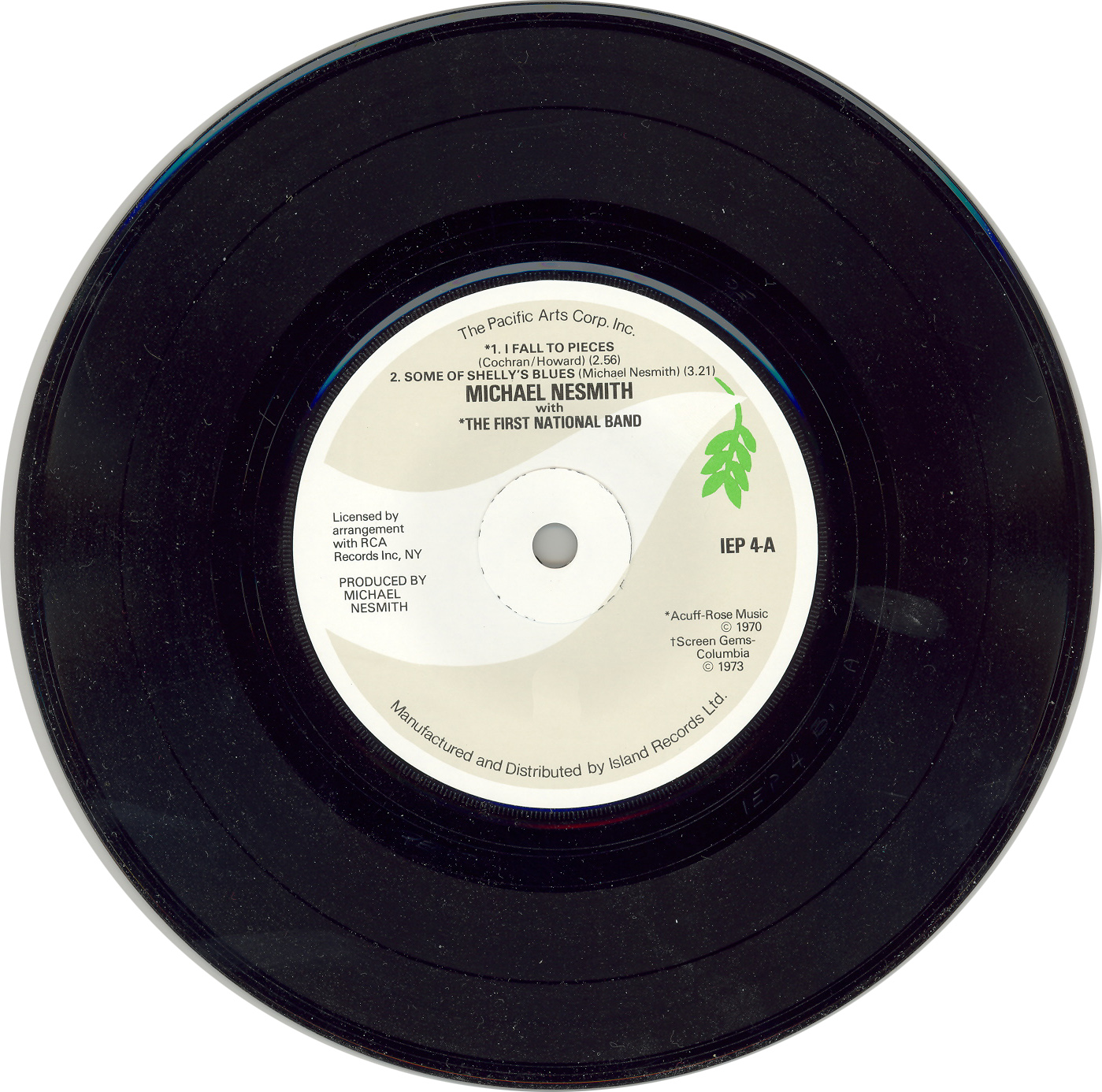
Extended-play vinyl record of Michael Nesmith's "I Fall to Pieces" with four tracks

An extended play (EP) is a musical recording that contains more tracks than a single but fewer than an album. Contemporary EPs usually contain up to eight tracks and have a playing time of 15 to 30 minutes. An EP is usually less cohesive than an album and more "non-committal".

The term "extended play" originally referred to a specific type of 45 rpm phonograph record other than 78 rpm standard-play (SP) and 33 1/3 rpm long-play (LP), but, with the advent of digital media, has evolved to apply to mid-length CDs and music downloads. EPs are considered "less expensive and less time-consuming" for an artist to produce than an album, and have long been popular with punk and indie bands. In K-pop and J-pop, they are usually referred to as mini-albums.

== Background ==
=== History ===
In the 1940s, when the 45 rpm single and 33 1/3 rpm LP were competing formats, 7-inch 45 rpm singles had a maximum playing time of only about four minutes per side. Partly as an attempt to compete with the LP introduced in 1948 by rival Columbia, RCA Victor introduced "Extended Play" 45s during 1952. Their narrower grooves, achieved by lowering the cutting levels and sound compression optionally, enabled them to hold up to 7.5 minutes per side—but still be played by a standard 45 rpm phonograph. In the early era, record companies released the entire content of LPs as 45 rpm EPs. These were usually 10-inch (25-cm) LPs (released until the mid-1950s) split onto two 7-inch EPs or 12-inch (30-cm) LPs split onto three 7-inch EPs, either sold separately or together in gatefold covers. This practice became much less common with the advent of triple-speed-available phonographs.

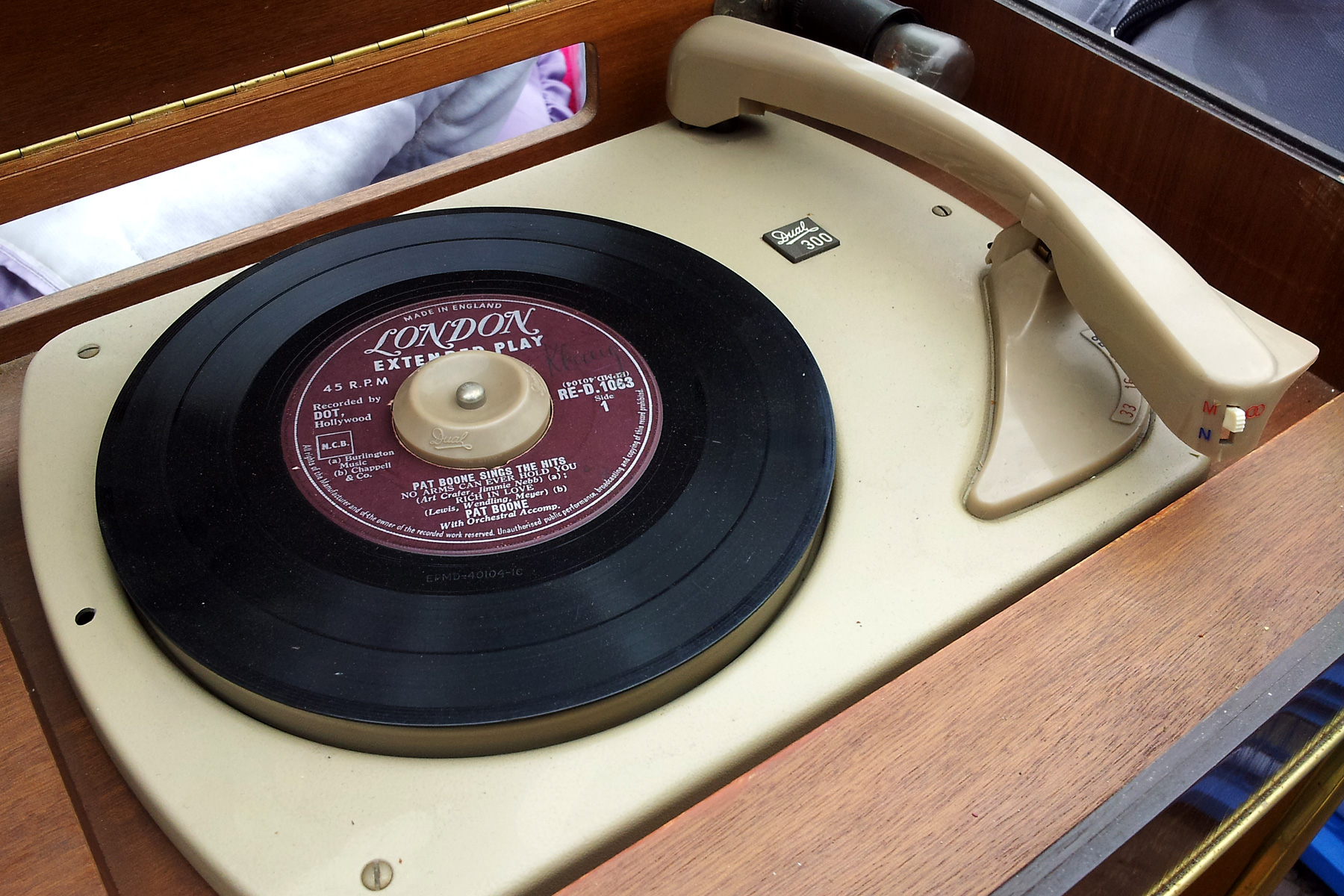
EP Pat Boone Sings the Hits, compiling four songs by Pat Boone

Introduced by RCA in the US in 1952, EMI issued the first EPs in Britain in April 1954. EPs were typically compilations of singles or album samplers and were played at 45 rpm on 7-inch (18-cm) discs, with two songs on each side. The manufacturing price of an EP was a little more than that of a single. Thus, they were a bargain for those who did not own the LPs from which the tracks were drawn.

RCA had success in the format with Elvis Presley, issuing 28 EPs between 1956 and 1967, many of which topped the separate Billboard EP chart during its brief existence. Other than those published by RCA, EPs were relatively uncommon in the United States and Canada, but they were widely sold in the United Kingdom, and in some other European countries, during the 1950s and 1960s. In Sweden, the EP was a popular record format, with as much as 85% of the market in the late 1950s consisting of EPs.

Billboard introduced a weekly EP chart in October 1957, noting that "the teen-age market apparently dominates the EP business, with seven out of the top 10 best-selling EPs featuring artists with powerful teen-age appeal — four sets by Elvis Presley, two by Pat Boone and one by Little Richard". Other publications such as Record Retailer, New Musical Express (NME), Melody Maker, Disc and Music Echo and the Record Mirror also printed EP charts.

The popularity of EPs in the US had declined in the early 1960s in favor of LPs. In the UK, Cliff Richard and the Shadows, both individually and collectively, and the Beatles were the most prolific artists issuing EPs in the 1960s, many of them highly successful releases. The Beatles' Twist and Shout outsold most singles for some weeks in 1963. The success of the EP in Britain lasted until around 1967, but it later had a strong revival with punk rock in the late 1970s and the adaptation of the format for 12-inch and CD singles. The British band Cocteau Twins made prolific use of the EP format, releasing ten EPs between 1982 and 1995. Typically used for the CD single, some bands like The Locust made use of the 8cm/3″ CD format to release EPs, including their 1997 self-titled EP.

EPs of original material regained popularity in the punk rock era, when they were commonly used for the release of new material, e.g. Buzzcocks' Spiral Scratch EP.

Ricardo Baca of The Denver Post said in 2010, "EPs—originally extended-play 'single' releases that are shorter than traditional albums—have long been popular with punk and indie bands."

In the Philippines, seven-inch EPs marketed as "mini-LPs" (but distinctly different from the mini-LPs of the 1980s) were introduced in 1970, with tracks selected from an album and packaging resembling the album they were taken from. This mini-LP format also became popular in America in the early 1970s for promotional releases, and also for use in jukeboxes.

In 2010, Warner Bros. Records revived the format with their "Six-Pak" offering of six songs on a compact disc.

=== EPs in the digital and streaming era ===
Due to the increased popularity of music downloads and music streaming beginning in the late 2000s, EPs have become a common marketing strategy for pop musicians wishing to remain relevant and deliver music in more consistent timeframes leading to or following full studio albums. In the late 2000s to early 2010s, reissues of studio albums with expanded track listings were common, with the new music often being released as stand-alone EPs. In October 2010, a Vanity Fair article regarding the trend noted post-album EPs as "the next step in extending albums' shelf lives, following the "deluxe" editions that populated stores during the past few holiday seasons—add a few tracks to the back end of an album and release one of them to radio, slap on a new coat of paint, and—voila!—a stocking stuffer is born." Examples of such releases include Lady Gaga's The Fame Monster (2009) following her debut album The Fame (2008), and Kesha's Cannibal (2010) following her debut album Animal (2010).

A 2019 article in Forbes discussing Miley Cyrus' plan to release her then-upcoming seventh studio album as a trilogy of EPs, beginning with She Is Coming, stated: "By delivering a trio of EPs throughout a period of several months, Miley is giving her fans more of what they want, only in smaller doses. When an artist drops an album, they run the risk of it being forgotten in a few weeks, at which point they need to start work on the follow-up, while still promoting and touring their recent effort. Miley is doing her best to game the system by recording an album and delivering it to fans in pieces." However, this release strategy was later scrapped in favor of the conventional album release of Plastic Hearts. Major-label pop musicians who had previously employed such release strategies include Colbie Caillat with her fifth album Gypsy Heart (2014) being released following an EP of the album's first five tracks known as Gypsy Heart: Side A three months prior to the full album, and Jessie J's fourth studio album R.O.S.E. (2018) which was released as four EPs in as many days entitled R (Realisations), O (Obsessions), S (Sex) and E (Empowerment).

== Definition ==
The first EPs were seven-inch vinyl records with more tracks than a normal single (typically four of them). Although they shared size and speed with singles, they were a recognizably different format than the seven-inch single. Although they could be named after a lead track, they were generally given a different title. Examples include the Beatles' The Beatles' Hits EP from 1963, and the Troggs' Troggs Tops EP from 1966, both of which collected previously released tracks. The playing time was generally between 10 and 15 minutes. In the UK they came in cardboard picture sleeves at a time when singles were usually issued in paper company sleeves. EPs tended to be album samplers or collections of singles. EPs of all original material began to appear in the 1950s. Examples are Elvis Presley's Love Me Tender from 1956 and "Just for You", "Peace in the Valley" and "Jailhouse Rock" from 1957, and the Kinks' Kinksize Session from 1964.

Twelve-inch EPs were similar, but generally had between three and five tracks and a length of over 12 minutes. Like seven-inch EPs, these were given titles. EP releases were also issued in cassette and 10-inch vinyl formats. With the advent of the compact disc (CD), more music was often included on "single" releases, with four or five tracks being common, and playing times of up to 25 minutes. These extended-length singles became known as maxi singles and while commensurate in length to an EP were distinguished by being designed to feature a single song, with the remaining songs considered B-sides, whereas an EP was designed not to feature a single song, instead resembling a mini album.

Following the introduction of CDs, music downloads, and music streaming to the market definitive distinctions between singles, EPs, and LPs have become elusive.

In the United States, the Recording Industry Association of America defines an EP as a release under 30 minutes containing three to five songs for the purposes of certification. Conversely, The Recording Academy's rules for the Grammy Awards state that any release with five or more different songs and a running time of over 15 minutes is considered an album, with no mention of EPs.

In the United Kingdom, an EP can appear either on the album or the single chart. The Official Chart Company classifies any record with more than four tracks (not counting alternative versions of featured songs, if present) or with a playing time of more than 25 minutes as an album for sales-chart purposes. If priced as a single, they will not qualify for the main album chart but can appear in the separate Budget Albums chart.

An intermediate format between EPs and full-length LPs is the mini-LP, which was a common album format in the 1980s. These generally contained 20–30 minutes of music and about seven tracks.

== Double EPs ==
A double extended play is a name typically given to vinyl records or compact discs released as a set of two discs, each of which would normally qualify as an EP. The name is thus analogous to double album. As vinyl records, the most common format for the double EP, they consist of a pair of 7-inch discs recorded at 45 or 33 1/3 rpm, or two 12-inch discs recorded at 45 rpm. The format is useful when an album's worth of material is being pressed by a small plant geared for the production of singles rather than albums and may have novelty value which can be turned to advantage for publicity purposes. Double EPs are rare, since the amount of material recordable on a double EP could usually be more economically and sensibly recorded on a single vinyl LP.

In the 1950s, Capitol Records had released a number of double EPs by its more popular artists, including Les Paul. The pair of double EPs (EBF 1–577, sides 1 to 8) were described on the original covers as "parts ... of a four-part album". In 1960, Joe Meek released four tracks from his planned I Hear a New World LP on an EP that was marked "Part 1". A second EP was planned, but never appeared; only the sleeve was printed. The first double EP released in Britain was The Beatles' Magical Mystery Tour film soundtrack. Released in December 1967 on EMI's Parlophone label, it contained six songs spread over two 7-inch discs and was packaged with a lavish color booklet. In the United States and some other countries, the songs were augmented by the band's single A- and B-sides from 1967 to create a full LP – a practice that was common in the US but considered exploitative in the UK. The Style Council album The Cost of Loving was originally issued as two 12-inch EPs.

It is more common for artists to release two 12-inch 45s rather than a single 12-inch LP. Though there are 11 songs that total about 40 minutes, enough for one LP, the songs are spread across two 12-inch 45 rpm discs. Also, the vinyl pressing of Hail to the Thief by Radiohead uses this practice but is considered to be a full-length album. In 1982 Cabaret Voltaire released their studio album 2x45 on the UK-based label Rough Trade, featuring extended tracks over four sides of two 12-inch 45 rpm discs, with graphics by artist Neville Brody. The band subsequently released a further album in this format, 1985's Drinking Gasoline, on the Virgin Records label.

Double EPs can also contain the work of multiple artists split across different sides, akin to split albums. An example of this is the Dunedin Double EP, which contains tracks by four different bands. Using a double EP in this instance allowed each band to have its tracks occupying a different side. In addition, the groove on the physical record could be wider and thus allow for a louder album.

== Jukebox EP ==
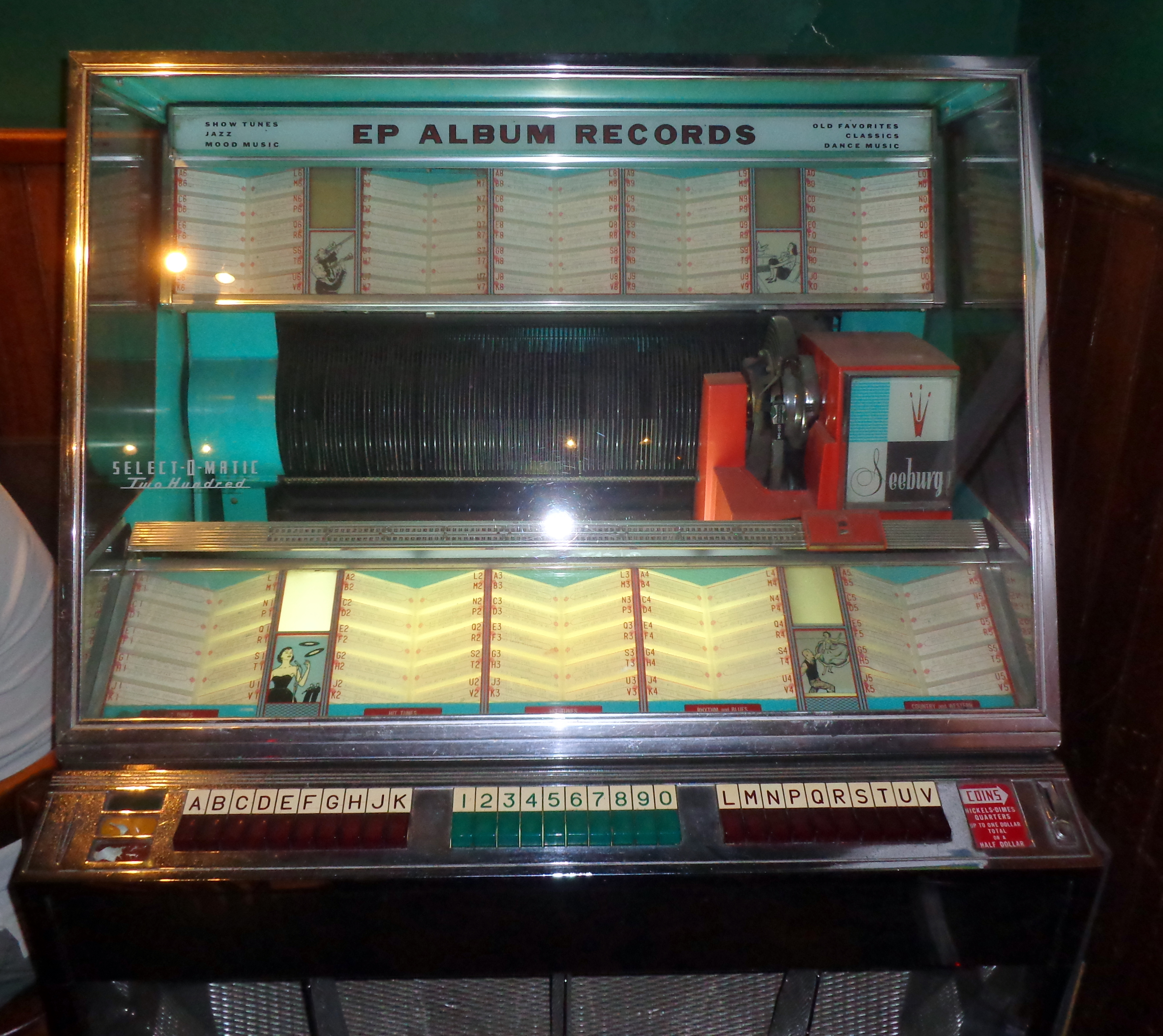
A Seeburg Select-O-Matic 200 Jukebox advertising "EP Album Records" in Buenos Aires

In 1962 Seeburg began releasing seven-inch, 33 1/3 rpm truncated versions of long-play (LP) albums for use in jukeboxes, inspired by unsuccessful earlier attempts by Mercury and Cadence to market the format to the public as "little LPs". Some songs were omitted for time purposes, and the most popular tracks were left on. Unlike most EPs before them, and most seven-inch vinyl in general (pre-1970s), these were issued in stereo.

== Mini-Album ==
Some EPs are marketed as a mini-album or mini-LP to emphasise their identity as a short record album or LP, usually retailing at a lower price than an album that would be considered full-length. Its running time is shorter than the typical album but longer than a single.

Some music distributors may classify mini albums with 7 or more songs as an album. In the United States, The Recording Academy's rules for Grammy Awards state that an album must comprise a minimum total playing time of 15 minutes with at least five distinct tracks or a minimum total playing time of 30 minutes with no minimum track requirement. In the United Kingdom, the criteria for the UK Albums Chart is that a recording counts as an "album" if it either has more than four tracks or lasts more than 25 minutes.

In South Korea, a mini album (Korean: 미니앨범) is a promotional term for a release that has a longer running time and more tracks than a single album but is shorter than a "full album" (정규앨범), also known as a studio album. In some cases, artists have used the chronological placement of a mini album in their discography as part of the title of the release. For example, 2NE1 1st Mini Album and Strawberry Milk's The 1st Mini Album.

A mini-LP is not to be confused with the Japanese CDs issued in a "mini LP sleeve" or "paper jacket".

== See also ==
- List of number-one EPs in the United Kingdom
