= The Beatles' Hits =

EP by the Beatles
- Released: 6 September 1963
- Recorded: 11 September 1962 – 13 March 1963, EMI Studios, London
- Genre: Merseybeat
- Length: 8:22
- Label: Parlophone
- Producer: George Martin

The Beatles EP chronology
Twist and Shout (1963)	The Beatles' Hits (1963)	No. 1 (1963)

Professional ratings
Review scores
Source	Rating
AllMusic	4/5 stars

The Beatles' Hits EP was released on 6 September 1963. It is the Beatles' second British EP and was only released in mono, with the catalog number Parlophone GEP 8880. It was also released in Australia and New Zealand.

== Track listing ==
All songs were written by John Lennon and Paul McCartney and feature either Lennon or McCartney on lead vocals.

Side one
No.	Title	Length
1.	"From Me to You"	1:56
2.	"Thank You Girl" (originally released as the B-side to "From Me to You")	2:01
Total length:		3:57

Side two (both songs appeared on the Please Please Me album)
No.	Title	Length
1.	"Please Please Me" (originally released as a single b/w "Ask Me Why")	2:03
2.	"Love Me Do" (originally released as a single b/w "P.S. I Love You")	2:22
Total length:		4:25

== UK EP sales chart performance ==
- Entry date: 21 September 1963
- Highest position: 1 (for 3 weeks)
- Weeks on chart: 43 weeks

== See also ==
- Outline of the Beatles
- The Beatles timeline
