= Bombsite =

Wreckage after a bomb explosion

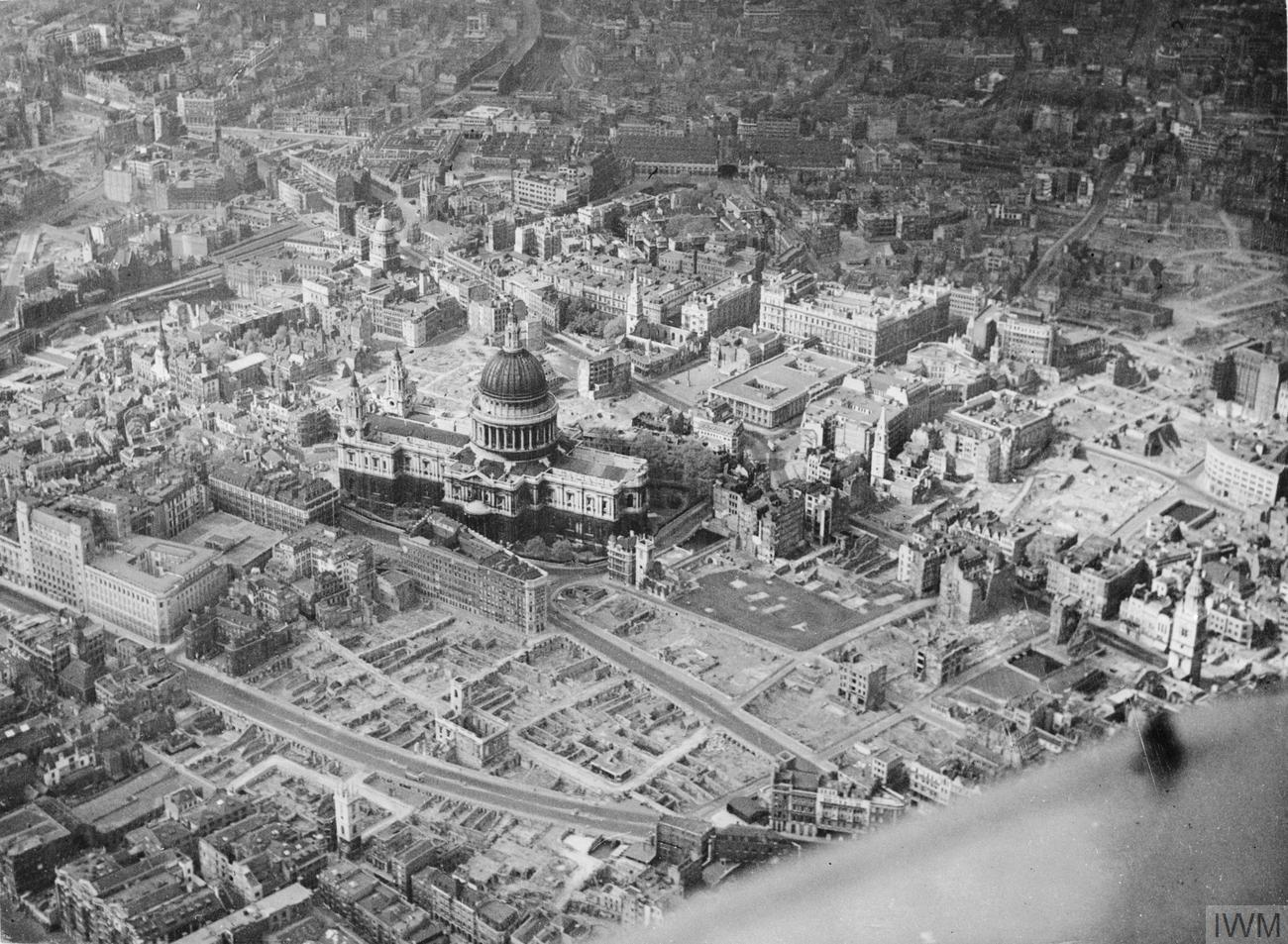
Bomb damage to the City of London in 1945

A bombsite is the wreckage that remains after a bomb has destroyed a building or other structure.

== World War II bombsites ==
After World War II many European cities remained severely damaged from bombing. London and other British cities which had suffered the Blitz were pock-marked with bombsites, vacant lots covered in the rubble of destroyed buildings. Many postwar children in urban areas shared a common memory of playing their games and riding their bicycles across these desolate environments. There were often abandoned bombshelters of the 'Anderson' type nearby.

In London, Liverpool, Bristol, etc., across the channel in Berlin and other places these sites were constant reminders of the death and destruction of the war. This was a contributory factor to the European psycho-sociological outlook of the 1950s and 1960s. The German city of Dresden suffered unprecedented levels of destruction.

== In literature and media ==
The rubble of Viennese bombsites and the remnants of the city's battered infrastructure serve as a backdrop to much of the action in the movie The Third Man, written by Graham Greene, an author who would return to this bombsite motif again in his 1954 short story "The Destructors".

== See also ==
- Aerial bombing of cities
- Urban renewal
- Air-raid shelter
