= Anthony Benjamin =

English painter

Anthony Benjamin RE, FRSA
- Born: Anthony Benjamin Brown; 29 March 1931; Boarhunt, Hampshire, England
- Died: 17 February 2002 (aged 70); London, England
- Education: Regent Street Polytechnic, Fernand Léger, Atelier 17 with WS Hayter
- Known for: Painting, drawing, sculpture, printmaking
- Style: Kitchen Sink, abstract, surrealism
- Spouse: Patricia Griffiths m.1950, Stella Downton m.1956
- Partner: Nancy Patterson 1959 until death

Anthony Benjamin (29 March 1931 – 17 February 2002) FRSA, RE was an English painter, sculptor and printmaker. Referred to as a 'polymathic artist' by critic Rosemary Simmons when writing about his work for the Borderline Images By Anthony Benjamin show at The Graffiti Gallery in 1979.

== Summary ==
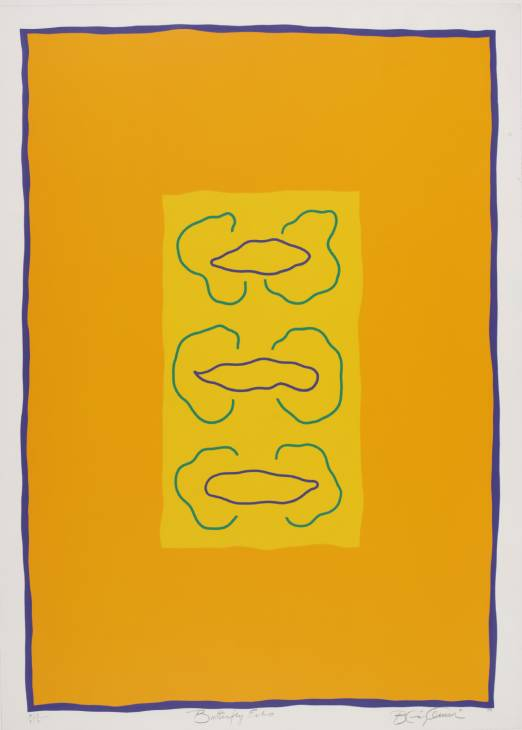
Butterfly Echo, Roxy Bias, 1979

Benjamin was born in England on 29 March 1931. He began his study at Southall Technical College in 1947 as an engineering draughtsman and was accepted into Regent Street Polytechnic, now known as the University of Westminster (1950–1954). After his first year at Regent Street, Anthony travelled to Paris and studied for three months with Fernand Léger (1951). After graduating, while working and travelling between St. Ives and Paris, he was awarded a one-year French Government Fellowship for painting and printmaking, studying at Atelier 17 with WS Hayter in Paris (1958–1959). Following his time with WS Hayter, he was awarded an Italian Government Fellowship in Anticoli Corrado near Rome (1960–1961). Between 1961 and 1973 Anthony lectured and taught in the United Kingdom (Ealing, Ipswitch, Winchester, Ravensbourne, Colchester, and St. Martin's School of Art), the United States (California State College) and in Canada (University of Calgary, York University). He returned to London in 1974 and in 1986 moved to Norfolk. Anthony was a fellow of the Royal Society of Arts (FRSA) and a member of the Royal Society of Painter-Printmakers (RE). He died in London on 17 February 2002.

== Biography ==
Born in Boarhunt, Hampshire he endured a difficult childhood, due to an unstable family life and being a wartime London evacuee. He claimed to have attended at least 12 different schools, learning little except self-defence in the many playgrounds he had to cross. He did not lose his interest in fighting and he took up boxing, eventually becoming a professional fairground fighter.

Leaving school in 1947 he took up an apprenticeship as an engineering draughtsman at the firm of Bell Punch, in Hayes, Middlesex. Anthony had an aptitude for careful drawing, as well as an appreciation and understanding of the logical principals of three-dimensional construction, but the lack of creative possibilities frustrated him. He dropped out of the apprenticeship in 1949 and was accepted on the sculpture program at the Regent Street Polytechnic. Unhappy with the academic restrictions prevailing in the department at the time and going against convention, he applied colour to a carving he was working on. When told to remove the paint or face expulsion from the department, he decided to leave, but he retained his deep interest in sculpture.

Benjamin's talent had been recognised by a senior member of staff, Norman Blamey, who was a fine draughtsman and teacher. Blamey accepted the rebellious student into the painting department, where soon Benjamin produced some accomplished paintings. Using a restricted, almost monochromatic palette, his subject matter featured the surroundings of the dark basement flat he shared with fellow student and partner, Stella, whom he drew and painted many times. As well as portraits of his neighbours, ‘Bill and Nellie' he also painted some exotic London Pearly Kings and Queens. At the end of the term, he travelled to Paris where he studied drawing with Fernand Léger for 3 months.

On graduating from college in 1954, his paintings were accepted for exhibition by Helen Lesore, the hardline, Social Realist director of the Beaux Arts Gallery, the London home of the kitchen-sink artists. However, when he started using a broader range of colour and looser brushwork, including elements of abstraction, he was told by Lesore to toe the line or leave the gallery. Once again, faced with established restrictions, he chose to leave, rather than compromise his freedom to explore the possibilities of extending his creativity in new directions. He served time in Prison as a Conscientious Objector, not just against military service, he was opposed to all forms of conscription.

He moved to St. Ives, using a legacy from his mother, to buy a small cottage that had belonged to the sculptor, Sven Berlin. St. Ives had been dominated by the influence of Ben Nicholson and Barbara Hepworth but by 1956 the "Middle Generation" of Peter Lanyon, Patrick Heron, Bryan Wynter and Terry Frost were becoming well established in Britain and were soon to be known in New York City. He accepted Peter Lanyon's suggestion to join the Newlyn Society of Artists and had his first one-man exhibition there in 1958. His work, inspired by the Cornish light, land and seascape led him to a new understanding of tone and temper. Henry Moore encouraged him, Francis Bacon gave him canvasses, and working within this rich atmosphere, Benjamin produced work which became more expansive and colourful, and gradually more abstract in concept sliding into Abstract Expressionism.

Benjamin, became friends with the eloquent Scots poet, Sidney Graham, who lived in the Coastguard Cottage at Gurnard's Head. When in 1959 he was awarded a coveted French Government Bourse to study etching at S W Hayter's, renown Atelier 17 in Paris, (where some revolutionary new techniques of plate making and colour printing were being explored) he took with him a copy of the recently published collection of Graham's poems titled The Night Fishing. This work became the inspiration for a suite of etchings which Anthony named An Homage to the Night Fishing. These fresh, colourful etchings have the energy of Tachist paintings. The Bourse Committee, very impressed with the work, extended Anthony's study time by a month, so he could finish his work. Some test proofs were printed at the time, but the plates were not editioned somehow they were misplaced during a studio move and not found again until the late 1990s when Anthony's nephew and printer, Simon Marsh discovered them, still wrapped in a French newspaper. Partial editions were then printed. They were shown in an Exhibition curated by Chris Stephens, about Sidney Graham and his artist friends. The suite of innovative prints is now in the Tate Britain Collection.

Anthony was awarded an Italian Travel Study Scholarship in 1960. He was profoundly moved by the art of the Early Renaissance that he saw in the museums, palaces and cathedrals. He was struck by the use of repeated flat geometrical shapes in many works, particularly by the strong impact and visual rhythm set up by the rows of saint's halos in Duccio's 'Madonna in Majesty' in the Siena Duomo. When he returned to London in mid-1961 this rediscovery of defined, flat shapes, shallow but articulate space and much more vibrant colour informed his new painting. Full of renewed energy as a result of his Italian experiences, he painted prolifically and exhibited widely. He had several one-man shows at the Grabowski Gallery in South Kensington, as well as at St. Catherine's College in Oxford and Belfast University.

== The Ealing School of Art: Groundcourse ==
He started teaching with Roy Ascott on the controversial Groundcourse at Ealing Art College in West London. This was a groundbreaking experiment in radical creative education, starting afresh from 'the ground up ... throwing out the old preconceptions'. Benjamin, Ascott and the other staff and most of the students were alight with new creative energy and enthusiasm, but the old guard staff and the more conservative authorities were alarmed by what they saw as a dangerous spirit of anarchy. The traditional hierarchical system ("Teachers teach the rules, students follow the rules") was set aside, ignored or trampled on. Pete Townshend was a student on this course. In his autobiography Who I Am he refers to the profound influence that this new approach to creativity had on his life and his approach to music. It also had an influence on Benjamin.

The revolutionary Course was not granted the new Diploma in Art and Design (DipAD) so the staff took up an offer to try the new approach outside London at the College of Art in Ipswich. One of the new students was Brian Eno.

About this time Benjamin was starting to experiment with a new approach to 3-dimensional works. He did not want to follow the conventional sculptural approach of carving and modelling figure like shapes from the usual materials, stone, wood, clay, etc. He admired Henry Moore's work, but he did not want to follow in his footprints. The work was beautiful, but it was stuck firmly in the traditional figurative past. Moore's figures had big holes in them, but they were still Figures.

Benjamin intended to make 'sculpture' that was more relevant to the contemporary and fast-moving world that was opening up at the time in London. He wanted to use modern materials, coloured plastic, fibreglass, polished metal, stainless steel and bronze. Intense glowing colour and reflections; amorphous and ambiguous shapes, he wanted to create works that crossed the conventional boundaries. He also started making series of silkscreen prints that used the same busy colours and similar shapes as the sculpture.

Working with Nancy Patterson, a Canadian artist and industrial model maker, they started making maquettes for larger pieces, using both the opaque and the transparent, fluorescent coloured Perspex. Intense heat was used to bend the shiny, expensive and unforgiving material into undulating ribbons that flowed off the rectangular 'bases' that were fixed to the walls. The reflections danced and enchanted viewers. Roland Penrose, director of the ICA, was very supportive and arranged to have the work, which included related paintings shown there in 1966. Norbert Lynton, Dennis Bowen, David Bindman, and others wrote enthusiastic reviews. Photographers loved the work. Theatrical celebrity photographer Lewis Morley took some wonderful photos of the work as well as many innovative portraits of Benjamin. Similar shows were held soon after at the Oxford Museum of Modern Art and at the Winchester Contemporary Art Society. Pieces were also shown at the Gimpel Fils Gallery in Davies Street and a show arranged for the new Gimpel & Weizenhoffer Gallery on Madison Avenue in New York.

When Benjamin moved on in 1965 to teach at Winchester College of Art, he managed to convince the reluctant but adventurous head of the college, sculptor Heinz Henges, to accept Eno on the Diploma in Painting Course, although as the authorities later observed when discussing the 'Eno Problem': "Eno was not a Painter, and had no intention of becoming one." He did eventually receive a Diploma for Painting although he never made any actually 'paintings'. He was interested in painting soundscapes, not landscapes. He and Anthony remained in contact.

In the early 1970s, Eno, as a member of Roxy Music, started developing music using synthesisers. After a long and enthusiastic conversation about the new possibilities, Anthony was inspired to make some screen prints that paralleled visually the effects that Eno produced with electronics. Working in partnership with master silkscreen printer, Kevin Harris, the suite of six images they named Roxy Bias was the produced by a complicated method of interchangeable stencils and endless colour proofing. The titles, Ringing Filter, Butterfly Echo, Inverse Echo, Erase Function, Multi–Mode Jitter, all came from the realm of electronic music. The images effectively demonstrated Benjamin's visionary conception and Harris's patience and incredible skill. Together, they achieved a remarkable partnership. The colours and images vibrated and danced on the surfaces, a visual and joyful equivalent of music creating "maximum visual aggression". The suite was very successful and won several major graphic prizes the first at the San Paulo Biennale in 1974.

In the late 1990s, after several years of working only in pencil and graphite, Benjamin started painting again in colour on large canvasses inspired by frequent visits to Marrakesh, where he became immersed in colour and surrounded by music.

Benjamin seems to have been exploring the possibility of suggesting movement by the use of colour and form alone. In such works, he also managed to create a spatial separation between these geometric figures and the endlessly varied grounds … To achieve the degree of density and intensity required he developed a complex method of masking to ensure the precision of their straight edges. The result is that the smaller forms seem to hover slightly in front of a field of warm colour, while their tapering forms seem to have been designed to accentuate the kaleidoscopic effect of their tumbling pattern … but such is the relationship between figure and ground and between the different colours and texture that they appear to shimmer before the viewer's eyes. Evoking, perhaps, the sun and heat of Morocco, the effect is not simply one of extreme sensory stimulation but almost one of physical disequilibrium. There seems little doubt that with these late paintings Benjamin fulfilled his own belief that ... art is about everything. Art isn’t just related to art. It’s personal. You draw on almost everything. It can be serious, but it ought to be playful too… You should enjoy it

Benjamin was certainly enjoying himself fully when he was working on these late paintings, completely engaged and immersed in the act of painting and bursting with new ideas. He was also revisiting and developing the spatial and colour concepts, and the connection to musical ideas that he had first explored in the 1970s in the Roxy Bias Screen prints, establishing surface rhythms by the use of repeated geometrical shapes that he had discovered in the early Italian Renaissance paintings and used in his own work in the 1960s. He was also using the skill and precision he had learned as an engineering draughtsman at Bell Punch in Hayes Middlesex.

== Selected solo exhibitions ==
- 1958 – Paintings & Drawings – Newlyn Art Gallery Newlyn UK
- 1960 – Obelisk Gallery, London, UK
- 1964 – Paintings – Queen's University Belfast Northern Ireland
- 1964 – St. Catherine's College Oxford UK
- 1965 – Artist's Prints – Institute of Contemporary Arts ICA London UK
- 1966 – Sculpture, Painting, Graphics & Drawing – ICA London UK
- 1966 – Paintings – Central Street Gallery Sydney Australia
- 1967 – Sculpture, Painting, Graphics & Drawing – Museum of Modern Art Oxford
- 1967 – New Works – Winchester Contemporary Art Society UK
- 1969 – New Prints – Gimpel & Weitzenhoffer New York USA
- 1969 – Sculpture, Painting & Drawing – Comsky Gallery Los Angeles USA
- 1970 – Sculpture – Gimpel & Weitzenhoffer New York USA
- 1974 – Graphic Work – Foundation Sonja Henei Neils Museum of Modern Art Norway
- 1976 – Sculpture & Drawing – Gimpel Fils London UK
- 1979 – Graphic Work – Graffiti Gallery Hjo Sweden
- 1980 – Borderline Images & Other Work – Rhok Gallery Brussels Belgium
- 1981 – Works on Paper – Den Internasjonale Kustuke Ringerikes Norway
- 1982 – Sculpture – Atlanta Georgia USA
- 1985 – Sculpture & Graphics – Galerie Aeblegaarden Denmark
- 1987 – Sculpture & Wallhangings – Art Expo New York USA
- 1990 – New Works on Paper – Gimpel Fils London UK
- 1992 – A Selection from an Amsterdam Diary – Chelsea Arts Club UK
- 1994 – Recent Drawings – Rhok Institut Brussels Belgium
- 1999 – Paintings and Etchings – Tate St Ives UK
- 2000 – New Works – Elm Hill Contemporary Art Norwich UK
- 2002 – A Selection of Works – Belgrave Gallery St Ives UK

== Selected public and corporate collections ==
- Aberdeen Art Gallery UK
- Albright Knox Gallery USA
- Arts Council of Great Britain UK
- Art Gallery of New South Wales Australia
- Art Gallery of Western Australia
- Birmingham City Art Gallery UK
- British Council UK
- Canada Council Art Bank Canada
- Confederation Art Gallery Canada
- Contemporary Art Society UK
- Department of External Affairs Canada
- Essex County Council UK
- Glasgow Museum & Art Gallery UK
- Joseph H Hirschorn Collection USA
- Kestner-Gesellschaft Hanover Germany
- Kirklees Museum Services UK
- Laing Art Gallery UK
- Leeds City Art Gallery UK
- Manchester City Art Gallery
- Museum of Contemporary Art Nagaoka Japan
- Museum of Contemporary Art Skopje Yugoslavia
- Museum of Modern Art New York USA
- National Museum of Art Cracow Poland
- National Museum of Art Warsaw Poland
- Norwich Castle Museum UK
- Reading Art Gallery & Museum UK
- Sheffield City Art Gallery
- Southampton City Art Gallery UK
- Tate Gallery London UK
- University of Calgary Canada
- University of Leicester UK
- University of Liverpool UK
- University of London UK
- University of Manchester UK
- University of Manitoba Canada
- University of Sussex UK
- University of Warwick UK
- Usher Art Gallery Lincoln UK
- Wakefield City Art Gallery UK
- York University UK

Anthony Benjamin's work is held in corporate collections around the world including Rank Xerox UK, U.S. Steele USA, J Walter Thompson UK, Grindlay's Bank UAE, Canadian Imperial Bank of Commerce Canada, and NKR Sweden.

== See also ==
- Ealing Art College
- List of St. Ives artists
