= Anna Valentina Murch =

California based British artist known for their public art installations

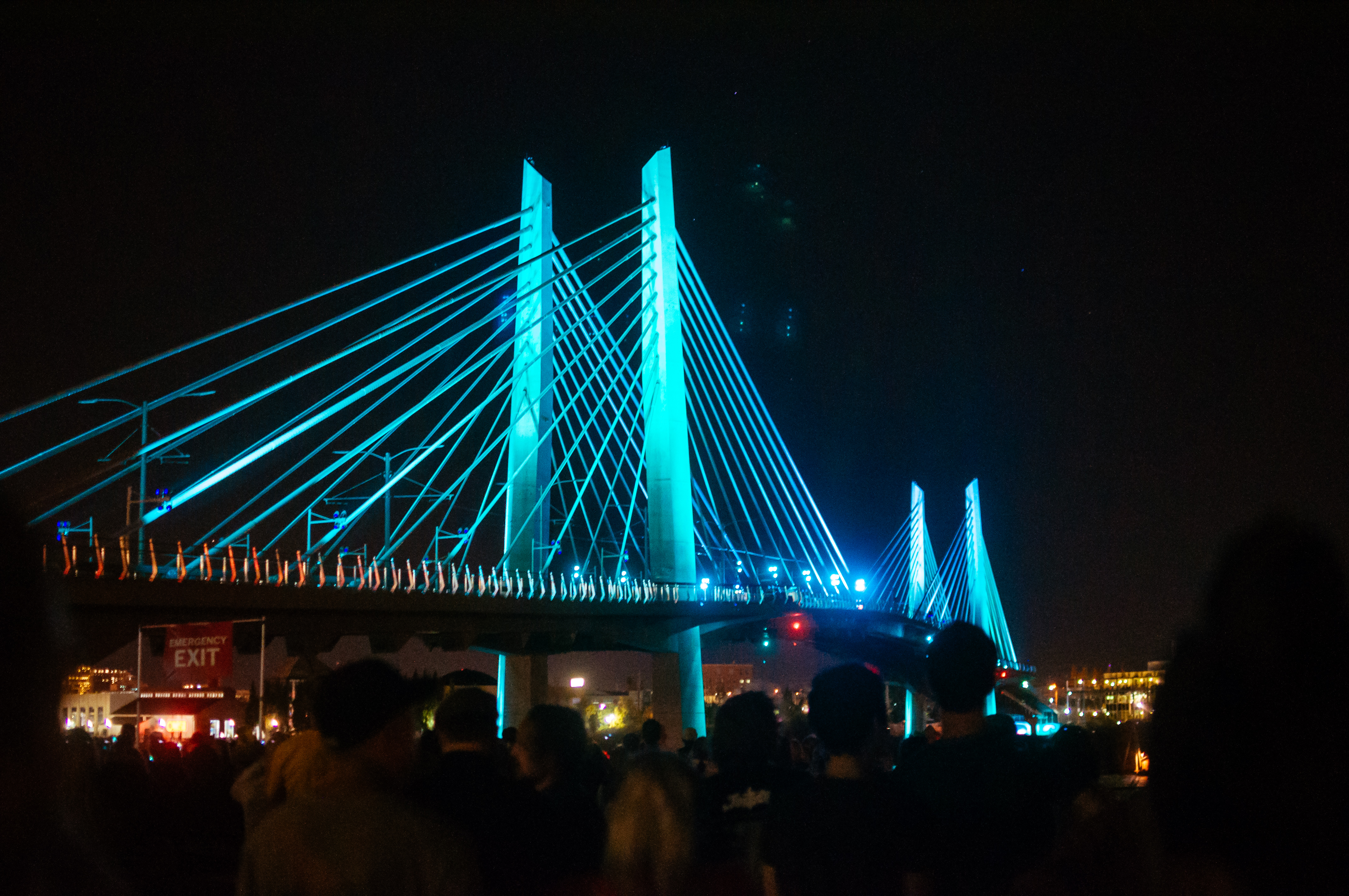
- Tilikum Crossing Lighting
- Born: 7 December 1948; Dumbarton, Scotland
- Died: 26 March 2014 (aged 65); San Francisco, California
- Occupation: Artist

Anna Valentina Murch (7 December 1948 – 26 March 2014) was a British artist who was based in San Francisco. She was known for her award-winning public art installations.

== Early life and education ==
Anna Valentina Murch was born in Dumbarton, Scotland, as the only child of Norman Robbins Murch and Valentina Gordikova Murch. Her father, a naval commander, established a charity for women and children following his retirement. Murch's mother, originally from St. Petersburg, met her husband in Shanghai during World War II. Subsequently, Murch's mother became an actress in London and played the role of Annushka in a film adaptation of Anna Karenina (1948), which was released in the same year as Murch's birth.

Murch was raised in London. She attended Croydon College of Art and earned degrees from the University of Leicester and the Royal College of Art in London (1973). She also did graduate work at the Architectural Association in London (1974-1974).

== Career ==
In 1976, Murch moved to San Francisco and had a live-work studio at Project Artaud. From 1983 to 1992, she taught at various institutions, including the San Francisco Art Institute and at the University of California, Berkeley. She began teaching at Mills College in 1992, and she held the Joan Danforth Chair of Studio Art there from 2005 to 2007. In 1990, she had a residency at the Exploratorium. Murch's work often involved large urban spaces, stations, plazas, bridges, and installations that created plays of light, water, and sound. In Miami, she designed Water Scores, a public plaza with inclined waterfalls. She was part of a team that was commissioned to help with the design of the St. Louis Metro. The design recycled 160,000 pounds of colored glass to "create a shifting, ephemeral light show". One of her last designs was Archipelago, a courtyard for the trauma center at San Francisco General Hospital.

In 2010, Murch gave an oral history interview to the Archives of American Art.

== Notable works ==
- Waterscape (installed in front of San Jose City Hall, 2005)
- Skytones (Seattle, 1998)
- Confluences (Seattle)
- River Wrap (Portland)
- Oasis (Brea, California, 2006)
- Umbra (Charlotte, North Carolina)
- Archipelago (San Francisco)

- Folded Light (Santa Fe, 1985)
- Light Passageway (St. Louis, 1993)
- Cycles (New York City, 1997)
- Tilikum Crossing (Portland, 2014)
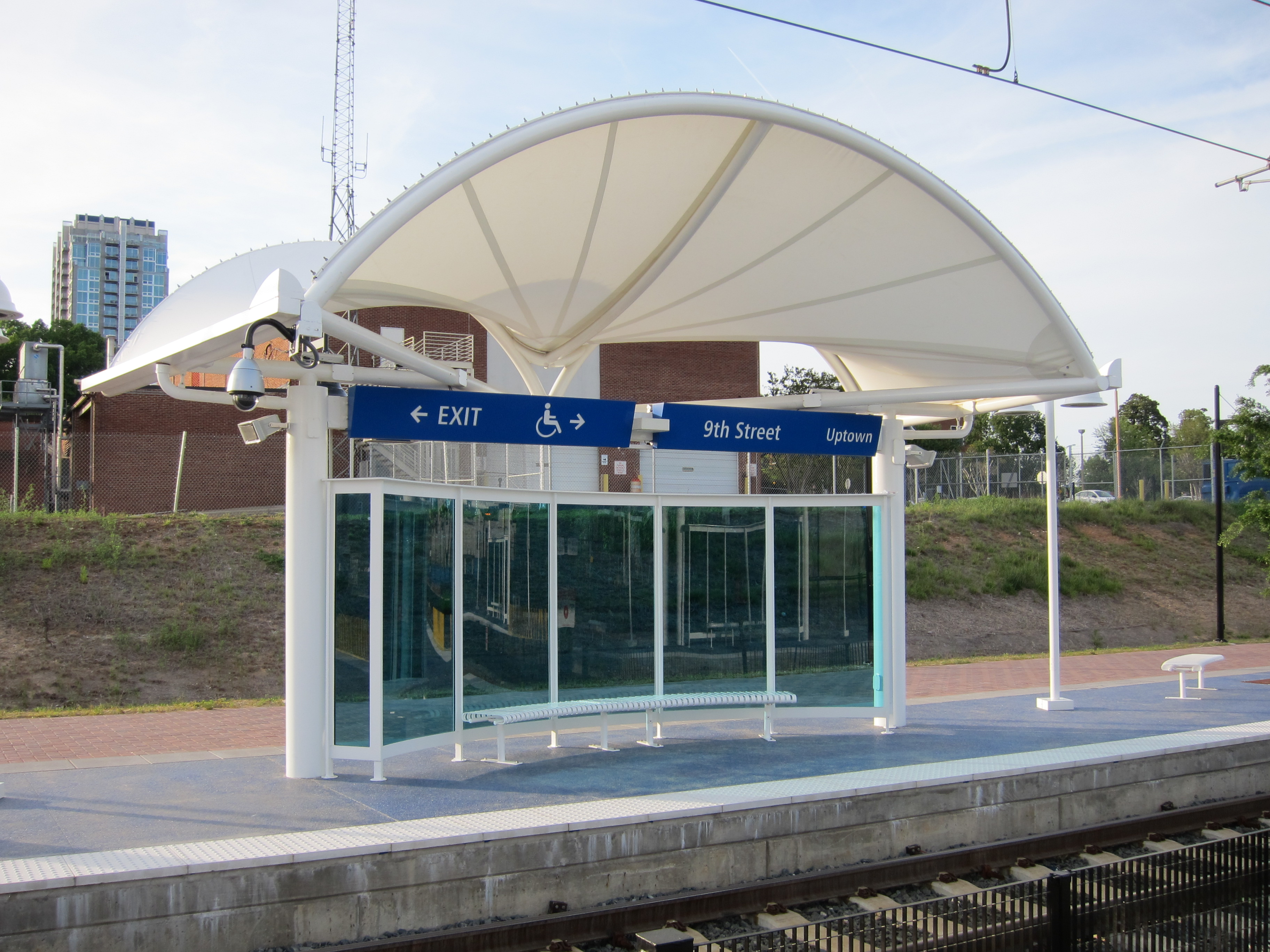
Umbra, 9th St Station, Charlotte, North Carolina. Anna Valentina Murch and Douglas Hollis designed this train stop as a white canopy with curved blue glass windscreen, inspired by Charlotte's historic textile industry.

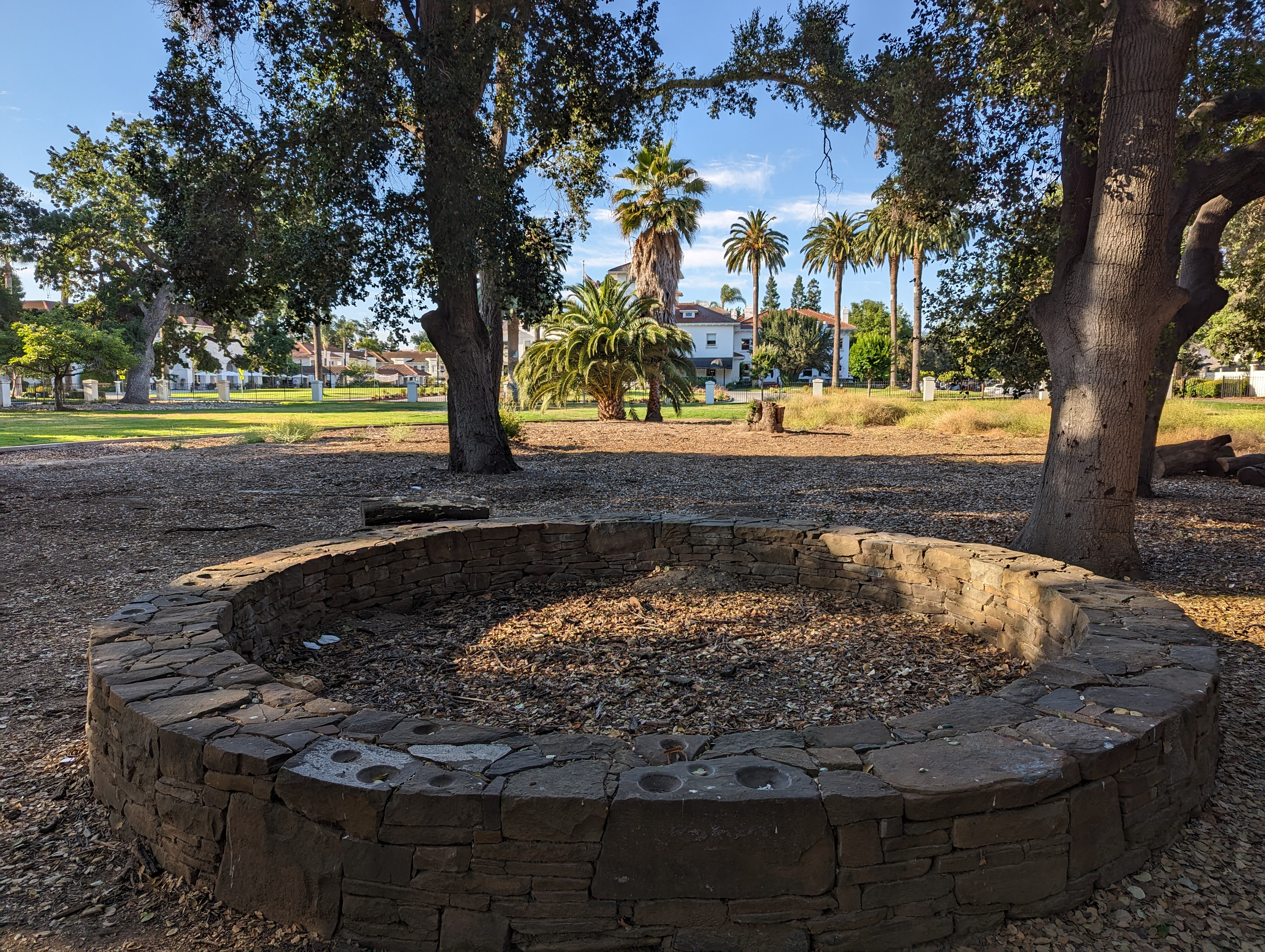
Garden Park, Eden vale Garden Park, 1997

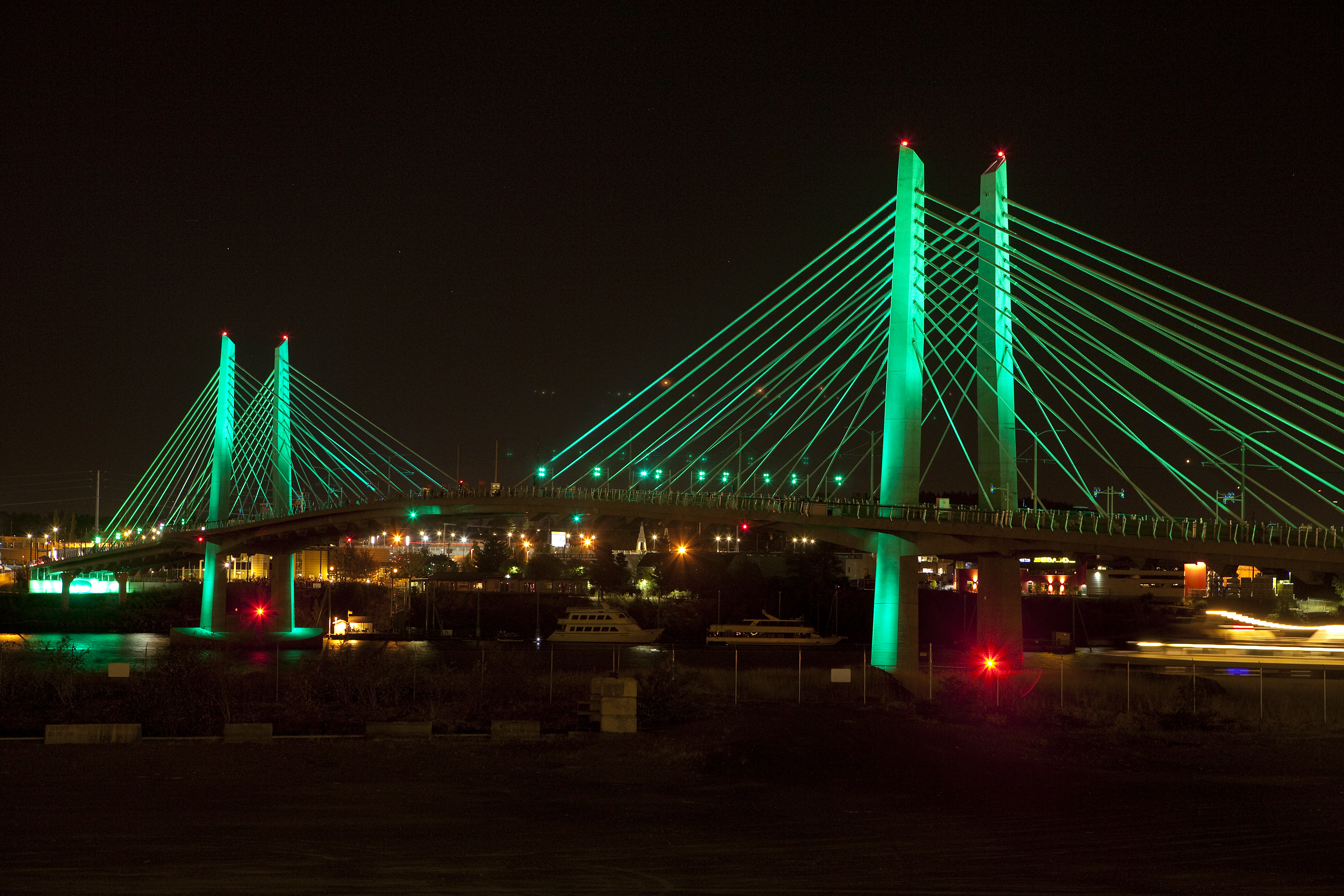
Image of Tilikum Crossing's First Light ceremony 2015

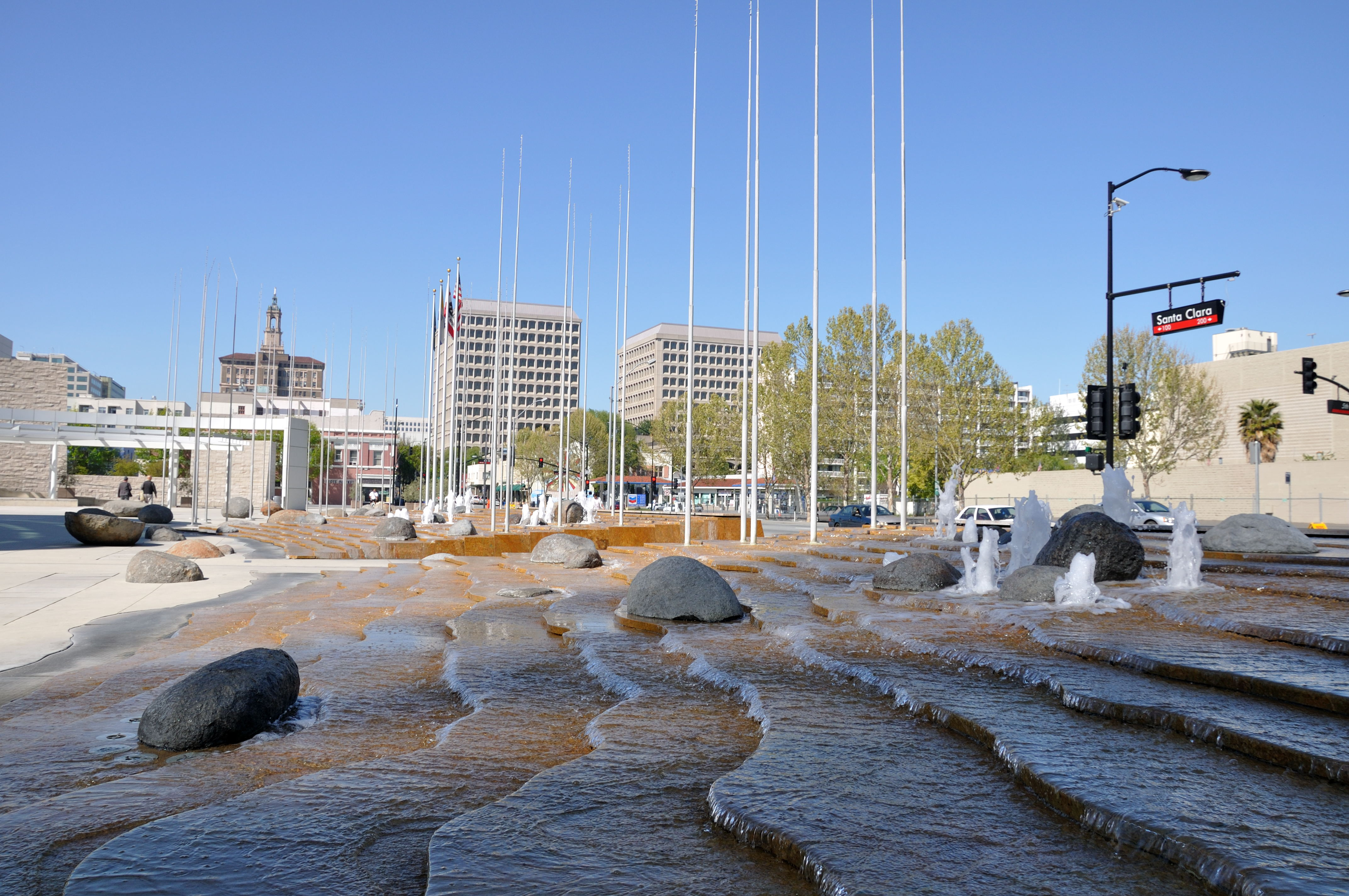
Waterscape fountain at San Jose City Hall

== Personal life ==
In 1988, Murch married fellow environmental artist Doug Hollis. She died in San Francisco in 2014, aged 65 years, from cancer.
