= Centro Brasileiro Britânico =

British cultural center in São Paulo, Brazil

Coordinates: 23°33′51″S 46°41′51″W

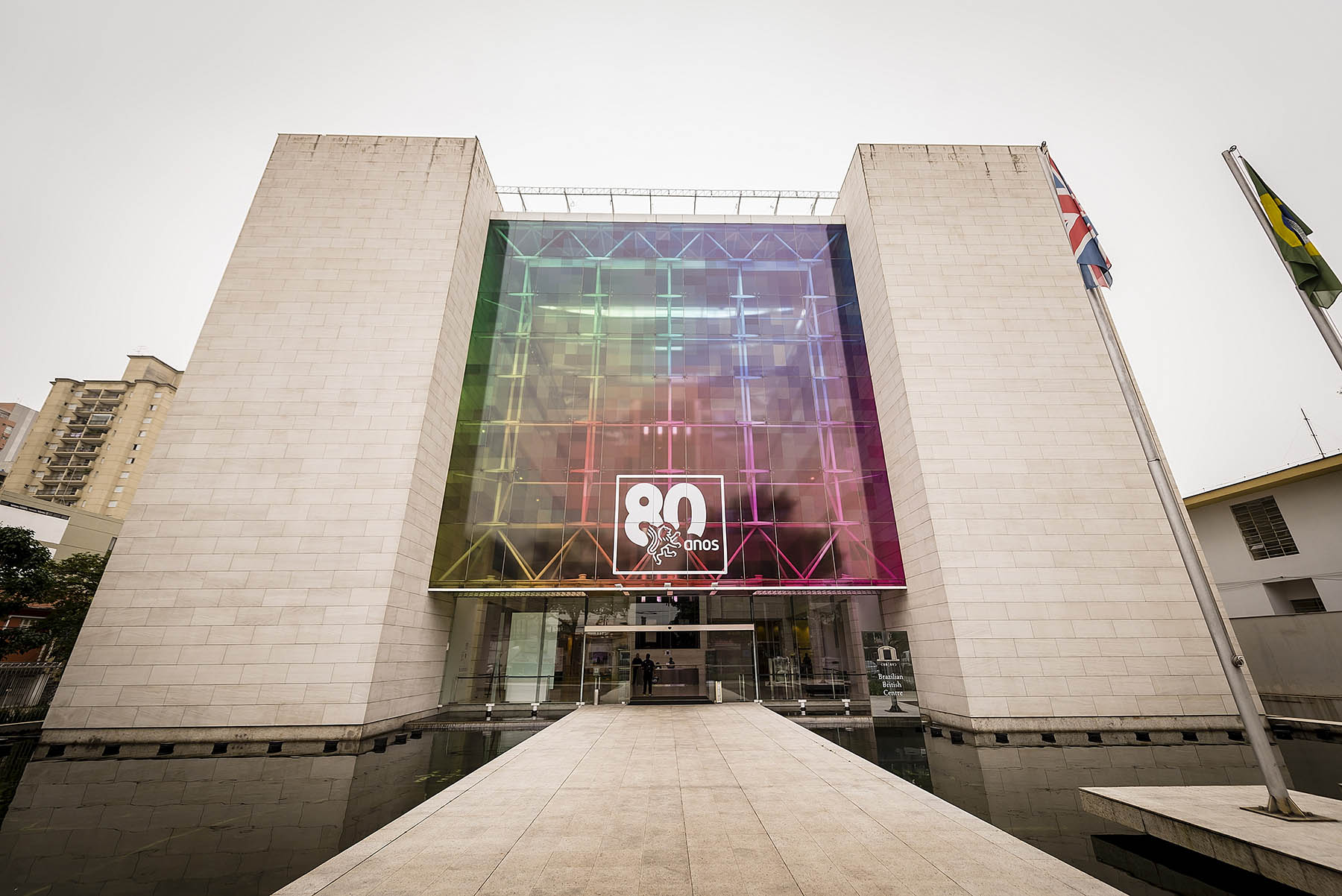
- Centro Brasileiro Britânico in 2015
- Former names: Centro Britânico Brasileiro

General information
- Architectural style: Contemporary
- Location: Pinheiros, São Paulo, São Paulo, Brazil
- Completed: 2000

Technical details
- Floor area: 12,000 m^{2} (130,000 sq ft)

Design and construction
- Architect: Marc Rubin

Website
- www.cbb.org.br

The Centro Brasileiro Britânico is an initiative dedicated to promoting British culture in Brazilian society, located in the Pinheiros neighborhood of São Paulo, Brazil.

== History ==
With a total floor area of 12,000 m², the building, which features contemporary architectural design, was completed in 2000 and designed by architect Marc Rubin. The complex was conceived by Cultura Inglesa in São Paulo and created to connect and promote initiatives and institutions related to culture, education, leisure, and commerce between Brazil and the United Kingdom. The building houses the BBC News newsroom in Brazil, as well as serving as the headquarters of the Consulate General in the city. The building also features a restaurant, a coffee shop, and an auditorium with more than 150 seats for hosting events.

The center also houses a library with more than 7,000 titles by British authors, in English version, such as William Shakespeare, Virginia Woolf, Doris Lessing, Ian McEwan, and J. K. Rowling. There is also an art gallery where artists such as Peter Davies and Brian Wall have exhibited their work.
