= Cassius (band) =

French musical duo

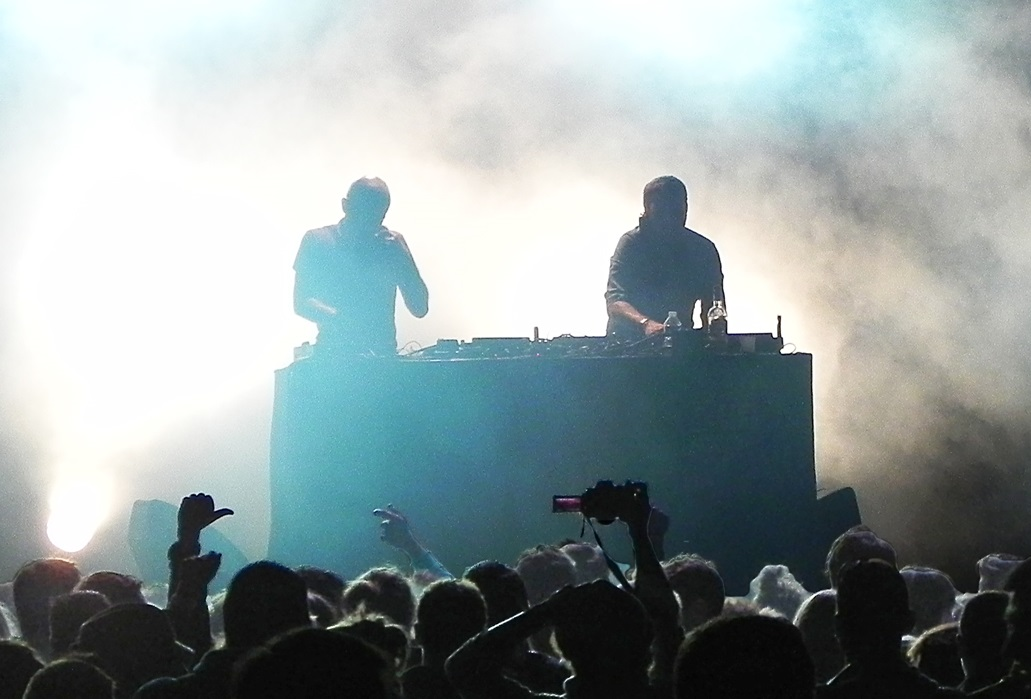
- Cassius performing at RockAdel Festival in 2012

Background information
- Also known as: La Funk Mob
- Origin: Paris, France
- Genres: Synthpop; French house
- Years active: 1988–2019
- Labels: Virgin; Ed Banger; Because Music; Interscope
- Past members: Zdar; Boombass

Cassius was a French musical duo active from 1988 to 2019 and consisting of producers Philippe Cerboneschi and Hubert Blanc-Francard, better known as Zdar and Boombass (or sometimes Philippe Zdar and Hubert Boombass). Under its different incarnations the duo is likened to the "French touch" movement of electronic music in the second half of the 1990s.

== Members ==
=== Boombass ===
Hubert Blanc-Francard (French: [ybɛʁ blɑ̃ fʁɑ̃kaʁ]; aka Boombass), born 31 March 1967, is a French musician and producer. He is the son of sound engineer Dominique Blanc-Francard and the older brother of the French musician Mathieu Blanc-Francard, better known by his stage name Sinclair.

=== Zdar ===
Philippe Cerboneschi (French: [filip sɛʁbɔnɛski], Italian: [tʃerboˈnɛski]; aka Zdar; born 28 January 1967 in Aix-les-Bains and died 19 June 2019 in Paris) was a French musician, producer and sound engineer, of Italian descent. Zdar was Dominique Blanc-Francard's assistant at studios +XXX (Plus30) when he met Boombass in 1988. Outside the Cassius group, Zdar was a producer and sound engineer. He was the owner of the French recording studio Motorbass (inspired by the name of his group with Étienne de Crécy). He notably recorded several albums of -M-, Phoenix and Chromeo. He also recorded for Franz Ferdinand, Beastie Boys, Lou Doillon, Sébastien Tellier, and others. He was in a relationship with Aure Atika with whom he had a daughter (Angelica) and then with Dyane de Serigny with whom he had two other children (Pénélope and James).

== History ==
Zdar and Boombass started working together in 1988, producing albums for the French hip-hop artist MC Solaar. In 1991, they created their first project, called La Funk Mob, and the following year, they started to increasingly experiment with electronic sounds. Zdar's experience with electronic music was influential in his involvement with Étienne de Crécy in the project Motorbass, who released a solo full-length album, Pansoul.

In 1996, Zdar and Boombass then created "Foxxy", their first self-released house music track, under the name Cassius, and the moderate success that followed lead to them remixing tracks for acts such as Air. In January 1999, they released their first single to become a mainstream hit, "Cassius 1999". It was published by Virgin Records, and entered the UK Singles Chart at No. 7. This was soon followed by their debut album, 1999, which had two more singles released from it, "Feeling For You" and "La Mouche". The music videos for "Cassius 1999" and "Feeling for You" portrayed the character Deadman, from DC Comics, as a DJ superhero.

2002 saw their second album release, Au Rêve. This featured the "empowered female disco" track "I'm a Woman", with Jocelyn Brown on vocals, as well as the hit single "The Sound of Violence", featuring Steve Edwards on vocals. This album also had collaborations with Wu-Tang Clan member Ghostface Killah and Leroy Burgess.

Cassius returned to the studio in 2006, for the more experimental single "Toop Toop", but the next album, titled 15 Again, featured more vocal collaborations than the duo had done with Au Rêve.

While rehearsing their 15 Again album tour, Cassius provided the community with the a cappella track of their single "Toop Toop" and encouraged fans and friends to start remixing the song. It became an immediate success: the band started the Cassius Workshop project and released more acapellas for remixing purposes. They claim to have received more than 400 remixes.

Cassius's song "I <3 U So" was sampled on the track "Why I Love You" on Jay-Z and Kanye West's 2011 collaboration album Watch the Throne.

In 2016, Cassius released their fourth album, Ibifornia, with Pharrell Williams, Ryan Tedder, Cat Power, Mike D and Matthieu Chédid (as guitarist of the album) as guests.

On 19 June 2019, two days before the release of Cassius's fifth album Dreems, Zdar died after accidentally falling from a building in Paris. He was 52 years old. On the release day of Dreems, the band announced that the album was the final album from Cassius.

Following the death of Philippe Zdar, Ed Banger and Glitterbox Recordings came together to release the final collaborative Cassius production, with the blessing of Boombass and Zdar's family. It's a remix of the song "I'm Not Defeated" by Fiorous. The song was released on 21 February 2020 on limited vinyl edition.

After Zdar's death, Boombass continued his solo career. He said in May 2020, that Cassius has no more reason to be. On 20 September 2019, Boombass released a remix of "Grand petit con" performed by -M-. He unveiled on 14 May 2020, "Pour que tu", which is present on EP Le virage, consisting of 5 songs and released on 5 June 2020. On 25 August 2021, Boombass published a book entitled Boombass. Une histoire de la French touch in which he recounts his career in the music industry. The book is published by Léo Scheer Editions.

== Discography ==
=== Albums ===
==== Studio albums ====
| Title | Details |
|---|---|
| 1999 | Released: 25 January 1999; Label: Virgin Records; AUS: 76; UK No. 28 |
| Au Rêve | Released: 17 September 2002; Label: Virgin (Europe), Astralwerks (US); AUS: 164 |
| 15 Again | Released: 11 September 2006; Label: EMI |
| Ibifornia | Released: 26 August 2016; Label: Ed Banger, Because Music, Interscope Records; AUS: 161 |
| Dreems | Released: 21 June 2019; Label: Virgin Records |

==== Compilation albums ====
- The Mighty Bop Meets DJ Cam et La Funk Mob (as La Funk Mob, with Bob Sinclar and DJ Cam) (1995)
- The Bad Seeds 1993–1997 (2004) (as La Funk Mob)
- CassiusPlay: Nike+ Original Run (2008)
- Best Of 1996–2019 (2024)

=== EPs ===
- The Rawkers E.P. (2010)
- Ibifornia (Remixes) (2017)

=== DJ mixes ===
- I Love Techno (2011)
- Cassius Club (DJ Mix) (2025)

=== Singles ===
Cassius

| Single | Year | Peak chart positions | | | | | | | | | | Album |
| Single | Year | AUS | BEL | FRA | GER | IRE | NLD | SWE | SWI | UK | US Dance | Album |
|---|---|---|---|---|---|---|---|---|---|---|---|---|
| "Foxxy" | 1996 | — | — | — | — | — | — | — | — | — | — | 1999 |
| "Cassius 1999" | 1999 | 77 | 25 | 17 | — | 14 | 35 | 52 | — | 7 | 8 | 1999 |
| "Feeling for You" | 1999 | 72 | 52 | 72 | 76 | — | 57 | 57 | — | 16 | 6 | 1999 |
| "La Mouche" | 1999 | — | — | — | — | — | — | — | — | 53 | 27 | 1999 |
| "I'm a Woman" (with Jocelyn Brown) | 2002 | 143 | 55 | — | — | — | — | — | 63 | — | 7 | Au Rêve |
| "The Sound of Violence" (with Steve Edwards) | 2002 | 143 | 58 | — | — | — | 29 | — | 79 | 49 | 1 | Au Rêve |
| "Thrilla" (with Ghostface Killah) | 2003 | — | — | — | — | — | — | — | — | — | — | Au Rêve |
| "Toop Toop" | 2006 | — | 52 | 39 | — | — | — | — | 76 | — | — | 15 Again |
| "Rock Number One" | 2007 | — | — | — | — | — | — | — | — | — | — | 15 Again |
| "Youth, Speed, Trouble, Cigarettes" | 2009 | — | — | — | — | — | — | — | — | — | — | Non-album single |
| "I <3 U So" | 2010 | — | 15 | 47 | — | — | — | — | — | 52 | — | The Rawkers EP |
| "Action" (featuring Cat Power and Mike D) | 2016 | — | — | 114 | — | — | — | — | — | — | — | Ibifornia |
| "The Missing" (featuring Ryan Tedder and Jaw) | 2016 | — | — | 121 | — | — | — | — | — | — | — | Ibifornia |
| "Go Up" (feat. Cat Power & Pharrell Williams) | 2016 | — | — | — | — | — | — | — | — | — | — | Ibifornia |
| "Ibifornia" | 2016 | — | — | — | — | — | — | — | — | — | — | Ibifornia |
| "W18" | 2018 | — | — | — | — | — | — | — | — | — | — | Dreems |
| "Calliope" | 2019 | — | — | — | — | — | — | — | — | — | — | Dreems |
| "Don't Let Me Be" (featuring Owlle) | 2019 | — | — | — | — | — | — | — | — | — | — | Dreems |
| "Rock Non Stop" | 2019 | — | — | — | — | — | — | — | — | — | — | Dreems |
"—" denotes releases that did not chart

La Funk Mob

- "Tribulations Extra Sensorielles" (1994)
- "Casse Les Frontières, Fou Les Têtes En L'Air" (1994, re-release in 1996)
- "357 Magnum Force" (2004)

=== Production credits ===
==== Albums produced by Cassius ====
| Title | Year | Artist(s) | Credits |
|---|---|---|---|
| Qui sème le vent récolte le tempo | 1991 | MC Solaar | Production by Boombass and Jimmy Jay |
| Prose Combat | 1994 | MC Solaar | Production by Boombass and Jimmy Jay; Co-production by Zdar |
| Paradisiaque | 1997 | MC Solaar | —N/a |
| MC Solaar | 1998 | MC Solaar | —N/a |

==== Tracks produced by Cassius ====
| Title | Year | Artist(s) | Album | Credits |
|---|---|---|---|---|
| "Tranquille" | 1994 | Sinclair | Que justice soit faite! | Production by Boombass; Mixed and recorded by Zdar |
| "Burning Bridges" | 2013 | OneRepublic | Native | Production |
| "Something's Gotta Give" | 2013 | OneRepublic | Native | Songwriting and production |
| "Oh My My" | 2016 | OneRepublic | Oh My My | Featured artist |
| "Adieu mon amour" | 2019 | -M- | Lettre Infinie | Additional production |

==== Albums produced, mixed and recorded by Zdar ====
- MC Solaar – Qui sème le vent récolte le tempo (1991)
- Phoenix – United (2000)
- Cut Copy – Bright Like Neon Love (2004)
- Chromeo – Fancy Footwork (2007)
- Phoenix – Wolfgang Amadeus Phoenix (2009)
- Chromeo – Business Casual (2010)
- Two Door Cinema Club – Tourist History (2010)
- Housse de Racket – Alésia (2011)
- Beastie Boys – Hot Sauce Committee Part Two (2011)
- The Rapture – In the Grace of Your Love (2011)
- Lou Doillon – Places (2012)
- Cat Power - Sun (2012)
- Kindness – World, You Need a Change of Mind (2012)
- Phoenix – Bankrupt! (2013)
- Jackson And His Computer Band - Glow (2013)
- Sébastien Tellier – Confection (2013)
- Sébastien Tellier – L'Aventura (2014)
- -M-, Toumani Diabaté and Sidiki Diabaté – Lamomali (2017)
- Franz Ferdinand – Always Ascending (2018)
- -M- – Lettre infinie (2019) (Recorded and mixed by Zdar except "Superchérie" et "L'autre paradis")
- Hot Chip – A Bath Full of Ecstasy (2019)
- Sons of Raphael – Full-Throated Messianic Homage (2021)
