= Inch'Allah (MC Solaar song) =

Single by MC Solaar
- B-side: "RMI"; "Hasta la vista"; "Solaar pleure"
- Released: 2002
- Recorded: France
- Genre: Hip hop, R&B
- Length: 3:10
- Label: East West
- Songwriters: MC Solaar; Eric K-Roz; Alain J

MC Solaar singles chronology
"La la la, la" (2002)	"Inch'Allah" (2002)	"Hijo de Africa" (2004)

Music video
- "Inch'Allah" on YouTube

"Inch'Allah" is a 2002 song recorded by French hip hop artist MC Solaar. The song wasn't included on the rapper's album at the time, but was only released as a single (or an EP) containing also four songs from his previous album, Cinquième As. The single topped the chart in France and became the most successful one of the artist.

== Music, lyrics and cover versions ==
"Inch'Allah" was composed by MC Solaar, Eric K-Roz and Alain J. This R&B song, which has "oriental sonorities" and a "lively rhythm", confirmed the popularity of the singer, which so obtained his second number one in France about one year after "Hasta la vista"; lyrics are in France, in spite of the songs's title.

In 2003, "Inch'Allah" was covered by Le 6/9, under the title "Lève les bras", and features as the first track on the CD single known as "J'ai des petits problèmes dans mon pantalon"; released as a single, it peaked at number 20 on 1 February 2003. The song was also covered by Garou, Jenifer Bartoli, Lââm, Mimie Mathy, Karen Mulder, Hélène Ségara, Patrick Timsit and Julie Zenatti for Les Enfoirés' 2006 album Le Village des Enfoirés and included in a medley named "Medley Époques musicales".

== Chart performances ==
In France, "Inch'Allah" started at number five on the chart edition of 10 August 2001, then reached number one, where it stayed for four weeks, then almost did not stop to drop, and charted for ten weeks in the top ten, 18 weeks in the top 50 and 23 weeks in the top 100. It ranked at number 19 on Year-end chart, and achieved Gold status. "Inch'Allah" achieved a moderate success in the Wallonia region of Belgium and Switzerland: it charted for seven weeks on the Ultratop 40 and peaked at number 16 in its fourth week; on the Swiss Top 100, it reached number 13, its highest position, in its third week, on 8 September 2001, and appeared on the chart for 14 weeks.

== Track listing ==
- CD single
1. "Inch'Allah" — 3:10
2. "RMI" — 4:19
3. "Hasta la Vista" — 3:38
4. "Solaar pleure" — 4:57
- 7" single
1. "Inch'Allah" — 3:10
2. "RMI" — 4:19
3. "Hasta la vista" — 3:38
4. "Solaar pleure" — 4:57

== Charts and sales ==
=== Weekly charts ===
Chart (2002)	Peak position
Belgium (Ultratop 50 Wallonia)	16
France (SNEP)	1
Switzerland (Schweizer Hitparade)	13

=== Year-end charts ===
Chart (2001)	Position
France (Airplay Chart)	26
Chart (2002)	Position
Europe (Eurochart Hot 100)	52
France (Airplay Chart)	20
France (TV Music Videos Chart)	3
France (SNEP)	19
Swiss Singles Chart	90

=== Certifications ===
Certifications for "Inch'Allah"
Region	Certification	Certified units/sales
France (SNEP)	Gold	250,000^{*}
^{*} Sales figures based on certification alone.
