= Ibifornia =

Studio album by Cassius
- Released: 26 August 2016
- Genre: Electronic
- Labels: Ed Banger; Because Music; Interscope Records

Cassius chronology
15 Again (2006)	Ibifornia (2016)	Dreems (2019)

Professional ratings
Aggregate scores
Source	Rating
AnyDecentMusic?	5.6/10
Metacritic	65/100
Review scores
Source	Rating
AllMusic	3.5/5 stars
Clash	5/10
The Guardian	3/5 stars
The Irish Times	3/5 stars
Loud and Quiet	3/10
Mixmag	8/10
The Observer	3/5 stars
Pitchfork	5.9/10
PopMatters	5/10 stars
Record Collector	3/5 stars

Ibifornia is the fourth studio album by French electronic duo Cassius. It was released on 26 August 2016.

== Composition ==
There is this theory about the tonality of songs – that it's easiest to make a sad song, because working with minor chord is easier. That’s why techno is so depressing. So our challenge was to make fun electronic music without making it cheesy.

— Cassius on the bright and joyful feel of Ibifornia

Cassius were inspired to produce an album with a bright, happy tone by their experiences of listening to the Bob Marley & the Wailers album Exodus (1977). Their intention with Ibifornia was to create a "fun electronic music without making it cheesy", due to the abundance of dark and depressing electronic dance music popular at the time. In coming up with a cheerful vibe for the LP, they decided that it would take place in a fantasy utopia land named Ibifornia.

Cassius and the press release categorized the style of Ibifornia as a hybrid of funk, house, soul, Afrobeat, synthpop, psychedelia, hip hop, gospel and disco.

== Track listing ==
No.	Title	Writer(s)	Length
1.	"The Missing" (featuring Ryan Tedder and Jaw)	Zdar; Boombass; Ryan Tedder; Pharrell Williams; Jaw	4:14
2.	"Love Parade" (featuring Mike D)	Zdar; Boombass; Mike Diamond; Luke Jenner; John Gourley	5:29
3.	"Action" (featuring Cat Power and Mike D)	Zdar; Boombass; Cat Power; Diamond	8:56
4.	"Go Up" (featuring Cat Power and Pharrell Williams)	Zdar; Boombass; Williams; Cat Power; Matthieu Chédid; Tedder	5:32
5.	"Ibifornia"	Zdar; Boombass	8:44
6.	"Hey You!" (featuring Ryan Tedder)	Zdar; Boombass; Tedder; Jenner	3:40
7.	"Feel Like Me" (featuring Cat Power)	Zdar; Boombass; Cat Power; Tedder	5:05
8.	"Blue Jean Smile" (featuring John Gourley)	Zdar; Boombass; Jenner; Gourley	4:02
9.	"The Sound of Love" (featuring Jaw)	Zdar; Boombass; Jaw	4:49
10.	"Ponce"	Zdar; Boombass	5:45

== Charts ==
Chart (2016)	Peak position
Australian Albums (ARIA)	161
Belgian Albums (Ultratop Flanders)	30
Belgian Albums (Ultratop Wallonia)	44
Dutch Albums (Album Top 100)	187
French Albums (SNEP)	33
Swiss Albums (Schweizer Hitparade)	59
UK Albums (Official Charts)	159
