= La Belle et le Bad Boy =

Single by MC Solaar

from the album Cinquième As
- Released: 2001
- Genre: Hip hop
- Length: 3:12
- Songwriter(s): Claude Honoré M'Barali, Fabrice Grassin

MC Solaar singles chronology
"Hasta la Vista" (2001)	"La Belle et le Bad Boy" (2001)	"La La La, la" (2001)

"La Belle et le Bad Boy" ("The Beauty and the Bad Boy") is the seventh song on the album Cinquième As by the French Hip hop artist MC Solaar and the only single released in America. The track's instrumental was produced by Kurser/ Fabrice.

This single had moderate success after being featured on the series finale of Sex and the City. It was also featured in Britain on the BBC series World Cup Stories, France: Black, White and Blue. Here it was used to help emphasise the multi-cultural nature of the team which won the 1998 World Cup.

NBC's coverage of the 2008 Beijing Olympics featured the song in a segment on the scandalous swimming rivalry between the French Laure Manaudou and the Italian Federica Pellegrini. The song's title is a take off on the traditional folktale "Beauty and the Beast".

The song was also featured during a scene in episode 30 of HBO's supernatural series True Blood.

== Story ==
The lyrics tell the story of two young lovers. They meet in school and the girl is quickly pulled into the world of crime by her rebellious boyfriend. While they dream of a good life, the crime-laden context in which they find themselves overcomes that dream. The song ends with the young woman being shot to death. Geometric imagery helps the narrator of the story depict the future the two crave, forming a house, yet also their innate separation of natures: "La belle et le bad boy, le triangle rectangle...".
