= Abd al Malik (rapper) =

Abd Al Malik
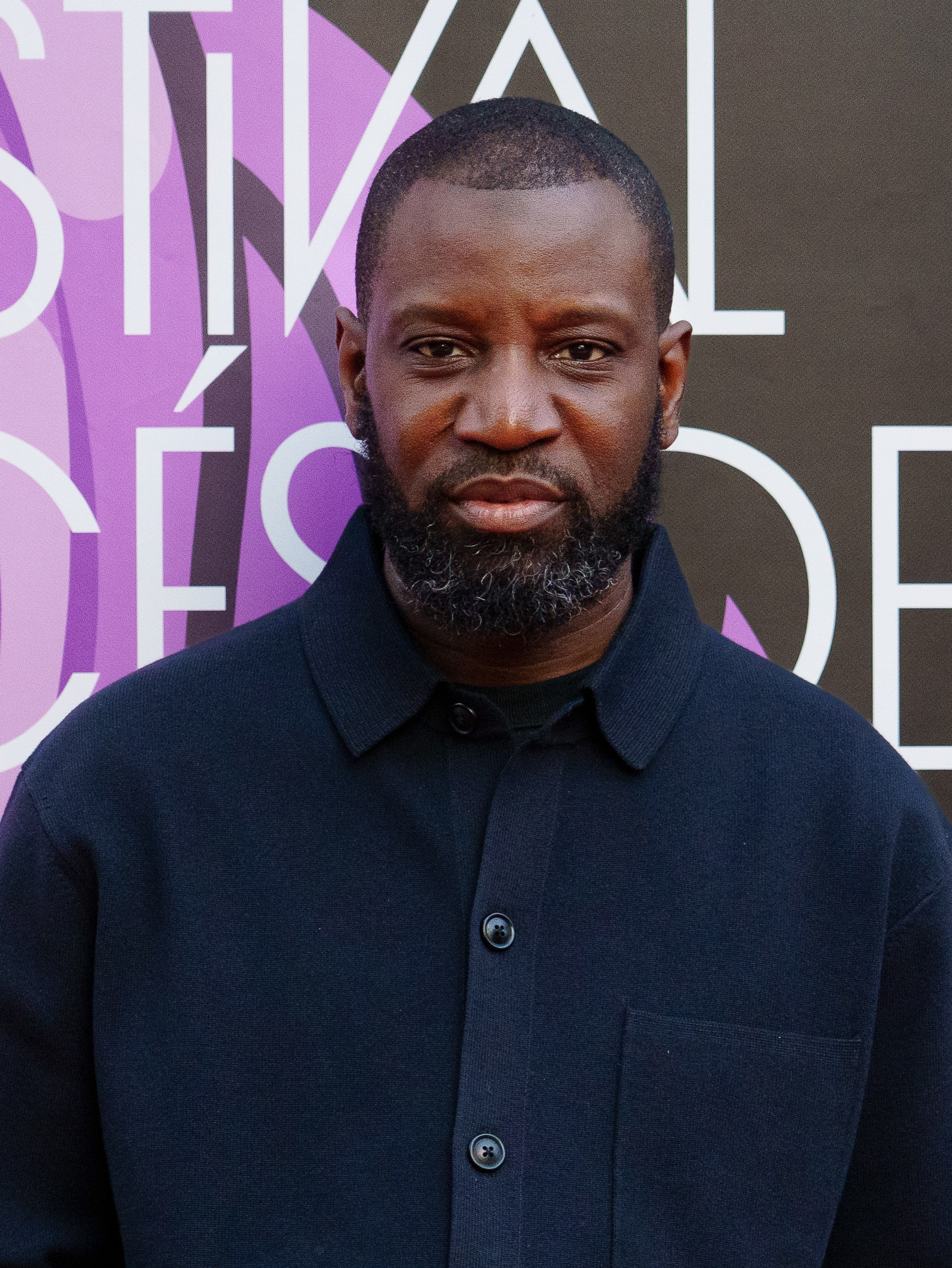
- Abd al Malik at the 2025 Malaga French Film Festival

Background information
- Born: Régis Fayette-Mikano; Paris, France
- Origin: Neuhof, Strasbourg
- Genres: Hip hop
- Occupations: Rapper, slam poet, songwriter, author, film director
- Years active: 1988–present
- Label: Atmosphériques
- Spouse: Wallen (m. 1998)

Abd al Malik, born Régis Fayette-Mikano is a French rapper and spoken word artist of Congolese origin. He has also authored books in French, and directed a film adaptation of one of his books.

== Musical career ==
=== In NAP: New African Poets ===
Talented in words and music, he formed with his brother Bilal and his cousin Aissa, a rap group they called New African Poets, also known by the abbreviation N.A.P. Other members included Mustapha, Mohammed and Karim, all from the neighborhood where he lived. Most of the group come from the Neuhof quartier of Strasbourg.

Having converted from Christianity to Islam, he took on the stage name Abd al Malik. This was an adaptation of his birth name Régis, being derived from rex meaning "king" in Latin whereas Malik means "king" in Arabic.

NAP released their first maxi Trop beau pour être vrai, produced by Sulee B, on High Skills, a label founded by Deez Nutz to promote local Neuhof hip hop talents. In 1996, they released the album La Racaille sort 1 also on High Skills, selling over 25,000 copies. Based on this, NAP were signed to BMG, and their 1998 album La Fin du monde with participations from Wallen, Rockin Squat (from Assassin), Radical Kicker, Shurik'n, Freeman (from IAM), Rocca and Faf Larage. A third album followed in 1999 called À l'intérieur de nous also with BMG.

== Writing career ==
Abd al Malik has been very active in writing as well. In 2004, he published his autobiographical book Qu'Allah bénisse la France (meaning May Allah bless France), about his childhood in Neuhof in a mono-parental family of seven kids, about his schooling, tough life and musical beginning. The book won Belgian Laurence Trân Prize in 2005.

In 2009, and following trouble in the French suburbs, he authored La guerre des banlieues n'aura pas lieu about life in the impoverished French banlieues inhabited largely by France's immigrant populations. The book won the Prix de littérature politique Edgar-Faure, a prize for political literature in 2010.

In 2013, he published a book, L'Islam au secours de la République.

He also announced that a film was in preparation titled May Allah Bless France! (Qu'Allah bénisse la France), based on his autobiographical book of same title. The film premiered at the Festival du Film Francophone d'Angoulême in August 2014, and won the FIPRESCI Discovery Prize at the 2014 Toronto International Film Festival.

== Theatre ==
In 2013, he engaged in a tour entitled L'art et la révolte, a tribute to the famous French writer and philosopher Albert Camus. It is a musical arrangement in which Abd al Malik sings, raps and recites texts from Camus or largely inspired by Camus, accompanied by classical orchestra mostly based on Camus' L'Envers et l'Endroit (English title Betwixt and Between).

== Personal life ==
In 1998, Régis Fayette-Mikano married French Moroccan singer Wallen, with whom he had a child in 2001. The following year, he converted to Islam taking the name Abd al Malik. He is greatly influenced by teachings of Hamza al Qâdiri al Boutchichi, a Moroccan spiritual leader and philosopher of Qadiriyya Sufism.

== Books and publications ==
- 2004: Qu'Allah bénisse la République, 208 pages, Éditions Albin Michel
- 2009: La guerre des banlieues n'aura pas lieu, 180 pages, Éditions Le Cherche midi 180 p.
- 2011: Le dernier français
- 2013: L'Islam au secours de la République
- 2015: Place de la République
- 2016: Camus, l'art de la révolte, Éditions Fayard
- 2021: Réconciliation

== Discography ==
=== Albums ===
Albums with NAP

- 1996: La racaille sort 1 disque
- 1998: La fin du monde
- 1999: À l'intérieur de nous
- 2008: Un monde perdu (compilation)

Solo albums

Year	Album	Peak positions			Certification
Year	Album	FR	BEL (Wa)	SWI	Certification
2004	Le face à face des cœurs	155	–	–	
2006	Gibraltar	13	50	97	
2008	Dante	11	48	66	
2011	Château rouge	22	70	–	SNEP: Gold
2015	Scarifications	61	108	–	

=== Singles ===
Year	Single	Peak positions		Album
Year	Single	FR	BEL (Wa)	Album
2011	"Mon amour" (feat. Wallen)	67	2 (Ultratip)	Château Rouge

== Filmography ==
- 2014: Qu'Allah benisse la France
- 2026: Furcy (working title)

New award	Victoires de la Musique; Urban music album of the year Gibraltar by Abd Al Malik; 2007	Succeeded by Chapitre 7 by MC Solaar

Preceded by Bénabar	Victoires de la Musique; Male group or artist of the year 2008	Succeeded by Alain Bashung

Preceded by Chapitre 7 by MC Solaar	Victoires de la Musique; Urban music album of the year Dante by Abd Al Malik; 2009	Succeeded by L'arme de paix by Oxmo Puccino
