= Le Tour de la Question (MC Solaar album) =

Live album by MC Solaar
- Released: October 27, 1998
- Recorded: 1990–1998
- Genre: Rap
- Length: 90:25
- Label: Elektra; Wea international

MC Solaar chronology
MC Solaar (1998)	Le Tour de la Question (1998)	Cinquième As (2001)

Professional ratings
Review scores
Source	Rating
Allmusic	link

Le Tour de la Question is the first live album released by MC Solaar in 1998. The album featured two discs worth of previous and original material spanning his career.

== Track listing ==
1. Nitro – 0:28
2. Zoom – 3:15
3. Dix de mes disciples – 3:49
4. Onzième commandement – 2:56
5. La concubine de l'hémoglobine – 4:39
6. Paradisiaque – 3:35
7. Qui sème le vent récolte le tempo – 3:02
8. Tournicoti – 3:52
9. Séquelles – 3:35
10. Caroline – 5:11
11. Obsolète – 3:22
12. Quand le soleil devient froid – 3:56
13. Illico presto – 4:00
14. Gangster moderne – 4:01
1. Nouveau western – 4:33
2. La 5ème saison – 3:48
3. Bouge de là – 3:05
4. Victime de la mode – 2:50
5. Wonderbra – 2:43
6. Les temps changent – 3:39
7. Galaktika – 3:34
8. Dakota – 3:39
9. Les boys bandent – 3:23
10. Protège-tibia – 4:24
11. Les temps changent (final) – 4:49
