= Inshallah (disambiguation) =

Inshallah is an Arabic-language expression meaning 'if God wills' or 'God willing'..

Inshallah or variants may also refer to:

== Film and television ==
- Inch'Allah (1922 film), a French film directed by Marco de Gastyne and Franz Toussaint
- Inshallah (1997 film), a Korean film starring Choi Min-soo
- Inch'Allah (film), a 2012 French-Canadian drama

== Literature ==
- Inshallah (novel), a 1991 Italian novel by Oriana Fallaci
- Inshallah: konflikten mellan Israel och Palestina, a 2001 Swedish book by Donald Boström
- Inch'Allah, a 1996 volume of diaries by Marc-Édouard Nabe
- Inch'Allah: l'islamisation à visage découvert, a 2018 book by Gérard Davet

== Music ==
- Inshalla (album), by Eskimo Joe, 2009
- Insh'Allah—Music of Lion's Blood, a 2002 album by Heather Alexander
- "Inch'Allah" (Adamo song), 1967
- "Inch'Allah" (MC Solaar song), 2002
- "Inch'Allah" (Grand Corps Malade song), 2011
- "Inch'Allah", a song by Samael from the 2004 album Reign of Light
- "Inshallah", a song by Goodie Mobb from the 1998 album Still Standing
- "Inshallah", a song by Yaakov Shwekey from the 2016 album We Are a Miracle
- "Inshallah", a song by Sting from his 2016 album 57th & 9th
- "İnşallah", a song by Sıla from the 2009 album İmza
- "Insha Allah", a song by Maher Zain from the 2009 album Thank You Allah

== See also ==
- Mashallah (disambiguation)
