= Caroline (MC Solaar song) =

1992 single by MC Solaar

Single by MC Solaar

from the album Qui sème le vent récolte le tempo
- B-side: "La Devise"
- Released: April 1992
- Recorded: 1991
- Genre: French hip hop, ragga
- Length: 4:43
- Label: Polydor
- Composer(s): Jimmy Jay
- Lyricist(s): Claude M'Barali
- Producer(s): Jimmy Jay, Boom Bass

MC Solaar singles chronology
"Victime de la mode" (1991)	"Caroline" (1992)	"Qui sème le vent récolte le tempo" (1992)

"Caroline" is a 1992 hip hop and ragga song recorded by French rapper MC Solaar. Written by Solaar with a music composed by Jimmy Jay, it was the third single from his debut studio album Qui sème le vent récolte le tempo, on which it appears as the tenth track, and was released in April 1992. It achieved success in France where it was a top five hit and helped Solaar to launch his own musical style.

== Lyrics and music ==
In "Caroline" the rapper reflects on a love story that ended badly, though the reasons that led to the split remain unknown. The lyrics contain many puns, most notably referring to the four playing card suits in the chorus. Lyrically, Solaar describes the various steps of the relationship and their associated feelings, including love, hate and regrets. A slow rhythm was chosen to fit the reflective theme of the ill-fated love story. About Caroline's identity, Solaar first told producer Jimmy Jay that she was an imaginary girl, but was never really clear about it; Jay thinks she was a real woman whom Solaar secretly fell in love with, but was unable to win over. Retrospectively, Solaar said he wonders how he could have written things that were "a little mature" and "well written" like "Caroline"'s lyrics, as at the time he was only "a teenager who wrote what he wanted for the world". Musically, it used a sample from Southside Movement's 1974 song "Save the World". The recording took place in a large studio in the Opera Bastille, accompanied by four violinists from its orchestra, and Jay rented for the occasion the first synthesizer used by the Beatles.

== Critical reception ==
"Caroline" marked a turn in Solaar's career as well as in the French rap industry as the song managed to create a new style. In 2002, Elia Habib describes "Caroline" as "an ode to the city, a moving work transfiguring the everyday environment in inventive, modern and expressive love terminology", uses puns like those of Serge Gainsbourg and displays a "linguistic erudition reminiscent of Raymond Devos". In 2021, French newspaper Liberation speaks of a "masterfully chiseled text", and of music that "twists with delight and languor around a subtly vaporous electronic construction that quite closely resembles it to nascent trip hop". However, the love theme has been criticized by other rappers including Joey Starr who saw it as a distortion of rap.

== Cover versions ==
In 1998, Solaar recorded a live version of "Caroline", which was included on his album Le Tour De La Question and released as a charting single in France and Belgium (Wallonia). In 2014, French duo Frero Delavega recorded their own version of the song, which peaked at number 107 on the French singles chart. In 2017, French singer Vianney covered "Caroline" accompanied with his guitar only in the French TV show "Les copains d'abord chantent l'été"; this version was recorded live at the Studios Saint-Germain and included on his 2018 album Le Concert de Vianney, and charted on the Ultratip Chart of Wallonia. There is also a live duet version with MC Solaar. This cover was deemed by RTL "an inhabited version", and by Charles Decant of Ozap "a very personal version". In 2020, Black M covered the song live accompanied by 300 choristers for a French TV show broadcast on France 3, and Voltage called it "a breathtaking performance".

== Chart performance ==
In France, "Caroline" debuted at number 20 on the chart edition of 2 May 1992, which was the highest debut that week; it remained at this position for three weeks, then climbed and reached a peak of number four in its 13th week. It remained for 22 weeks in the top 50, 12 of them in the top 20. A live version was released in 1998 and entered the chart for seven weeks, with a peak at number 59. In Belgium (Wallonia), the live version charted for eight weeks in 1999, with a peak at number 31 the last week. On the European Hot 100, the original version started at number 90 on 30 May 1992, reached a peak of number 25 in its 11th week and fell off the chart after 18 weeks of presence.

== Track listings ==
=== 1992 studio version ===
- CD single
1. "Caroline" — 4:43
2. "La Devise" — 3:39
- 7" single
1. "Caroline" — 4:43
2. "La Devise" — 3:39
- CD maxi
1. "Caroline" — 4:43
2. "La Devise" — 3:39
3. "Qui sème le vent récolte le tempo" (funkydelic mix) — 3:26
- 12" maxi
1. "Caroline" — 4:43
2. "La Devise" — 3:39
3. "Qui sème le vent récolte le tempo" (funkydelic mix) — 3:26
- 12" maxi - Remixes
1. "Caroline" (aeroplane mix) — 6:20
2. "Caroline"(powerfuzz mix) — 5:36
- CD maxi - Remixes
1. "Caroline" (edit) — 4:05
2. "Caroline" (aeroplane mix) — 6:20
3. "Caroline"(powerfuzz mix) — 5:36
- Cassette
1. "Caroline" — 4:43
2. "La Devise" — 3:39

=== 1998 live version ===
- CD single
1. "Caroline" — 5:12
2. "Victime de la mode" — 2:51
3. "Les Boys bandent" — 3:23

== Personnel ==
- Design — Alain Frappier
- Photography — Philippe Bordas
- Producer — Pigale Boom Bass, Jimmy Jay

== Charts ==
Studio version

Chart (1992)	Peak position
Europe (Eurochart Hot 100)	25
France (Airplay Chart [AM Stations])	5
France (SNEP)	4
Quebec (ADISQ)	17

Live version

Chart (1999)	Peak position
Belgium (Ultratop 50 Wallonia)	31
France (SNEP)	59

== Release history ==
Country	Date	Format	Label
France	1992	CD single	Polydor
France	1992	7" single	Polydor
France	1992	12" maxi	Polydor
France	1992	CD maxi	Polydor
France	1992	Cassette	Polydor
France	1992	12" maxi - Remixes	Polydor
France	1992	CD maxi - Remixes	Polydor
France	1998	CD single	Sentinel Ouest
