= Au Rêve =

Studio album by Cassius
- Released: 17 September 2002
- Recorded: 2001–2002
- Genre: French house
- Length: 70:07
- Labels: Virgin (Europe); Astralwerks (US)
- Producers: Zdar; Boombass

Cassius chronology
1999 (1999)	Au Rêve (2002)	15 Again (2006)

Singles from Au Rêve
- 1. "I'm a Woman" Released: June 15, 2002; 2. "The Sound of Violence" Released: October 10, 2002; 3. "Thrilla" Released: April 2, 2003

Au Rêve is the second studio album by French electronic duo Cassius, released on 17 September 2002 by Virgin Records in Europe and Astralwerks in the United States.

== Writing, production and content ==
The album was written and produced by Cassius members Zdar and Boombass.

Au Rêve is a progression from Cassius' debut album 1999 in that it is a more traditional house-oriented effort that uses less sampling and more live vocalists. Collaborators include Jocelyn Brown, Ghostface Killah and Steve Edwards. The Edwards track, "The Sound of Violence", topped the U.S. Hot Dance Club Play chart.

== Reception ==
Professional ratings
Review scores
Source	Rating
AllMusic	4/5 stars
BBC Music	mixed
URB	3/5 stars

Au Rêve has received a mixed reception from critics. David Silverman of BBC Music called it "Excellent in places, awkward and peculiar in others" and wrote: "There's nothing really new here, but then that isn't really the criteria for whether an album is good or not – its [sic] just a pity Cassius couldn't recapture the spontaneity of 1999."

== Track listing ==
All tracks are written by Zdar and Boombass; additional writers noted.

No.	Title	Writer(s)	Length
1.	"Hi Water"		4:38
2.	"The Sound of Violence"	Steve Edwards	7:13
3.	"Under Influence"	Leroy Burgess; Roy Parham	5:14
4.	"Room Tone"		1:04
5.	"Thrilla"	Dennis Coles	6:03
6.	"Telephone Love"		6:42
7.	"I'm a Woman"	Jocelyn Brown	4:22
8.	"Protection"	Gladys Gambie	3:59
9.	"Till We Got You and Me"	Burgess; Parham	5:53
10.	"20 Years (How Do You See Me Now)"		4:37
11.	"Nothing"		5:25
12.	"Barocco"		3:06
13.	"On"		4:12
14.	"Au Rêve"		7:39

Deluxe edition
No.	Title	Length
15.	"I'm A Woman" (Cassius Remix)	3:45
16.	"The Sound Of Violence" (Reggae Rock Mix)	3:27
17.	"The Sound Of Violence" (Cosmo Vitelli)	5:12
18.	"The Sound Of Violence" (Narcotic Thrust Remix)	7:34
19.	"Thrilla" (The Streets Remix)	3:08

== Charts ==
Chart (2002)	Peak position
Australian Albums (ARIA)	164
French Albums (SNEP)	54
