= Bouge de là =

Single by MC Solaar

from the album Qui sème le vent récolte le tempo
- Released: 1991
- Genre: Hip hop
- Length: 3:12
- Songwriter(s): Claude M'Barali; Jean-François Delfour
- Producer(s): Boom Bass; Jimmy Jay

MC Solaar singles chronology
| "Bouge de là" (1991) | "Victime de la mode" (1991) |

"Bouge de là" (French, meaning: "move from there" or "get out of here", also translated as "take a hike") is the debut single by MC Solaar. It samples "The Message" by Cymande, a band formed in London in the early 1970s. This was the first single from his album Qui sème le vent récolte le tempo, and reached No. 22 on the French SNEP Singles Chart in September 1991. It was also the second hip hop hit in France, after Benny B's "Vous êtes fous!" in 1990, although it was considered by the French newspaper Le Figaro as the first one.

The song was covered by Les Enfoirés on their album 2011: Dans l'œil des Enfoirés, and included in the medley "Une nuit au musée". The song was also performed by Grégoire, Alizée, Jean-Louis Aubert, Zazie, Renan Luce, Hélène Ségara, Claire Keim, Tina Arena, Christophe Maé and Gérard Jugnot.

== Formats and track listings ==
CD-maxi Polydor

1. "Bouge de là" (3:12)
2. "Bouge de là" (Version Longue) (8:17)
3. "Bouge de là" (Réconfort Mix) (5:47)
4. "Bouge de là" (Underground Mix) (3:20)

CD-maxi Talkin' Loud

1. "Bouge de là" (3:12)
2. "À dix de mes disciples" (4:54)
3. "Qui sème le vent récolte le tempo" (LP Mix) (4:13)
4. "Bouge de là" (Version Longue) (8:17)

12"-maxi Polydor

1. "Bouge de là" (Réconfort Mix) (5:47)
2. "Bouge de là" (Réconfort Edit) (4:36)
3. "Bouge de là" (Underground Mix) (3:20)
4. "Bouge de là" (Demo) (4:08)

12"-maxi Talkin' Loud

1. "Bouge de là" (Version Longue) (8:17)
2. "Bouge de là" (Badhouse Mix) (3:13)
3. "À dix de mes disciples" (4:54)
4. "Qui sème le vent récolte le tempo" (LP Mix) (4:13)

7" single

1. "Bouge de là" (3:12)
2. "Bouge de là" (Instrumental) (3:12)

CD single

1. "Bouge de là" (3:12)
2. "Bouge de là" (Instrumental) (3:12)

== Personnel ==
- Bass: Laurent Verneray
- Chorus: Melaaz
- Keyboards: Jean-François Delfour
- Mixed by Etienne De Crecy
- Producer, scratches: Jimmy Jay
- Recorded by Philippe "Zsdar" Cerboneschi
- Recorded and mixed at Studio Plus Trente

== Charts ==
| Chart (1991) | Peak position |
|---|---|
| France (SNEP) | 22 |
