= Au pays de Gandhi =

Single by MC Solaar

from the album Mach 6
- Released: 2003
- Genre: Hip hop
- Length: 3:33
- Songwriter(s): Alain Etchart, Eric Kroczynski, Claude M'Barali

MC Solaar singles chronology
"Hijo de Africa" (2003)	"Au pays de Gandhi" (2003)	"Mollah Solaar" (2004)

"Au pays de Gandhi" ("Gandhi's country") is the 9th song on the 2003 album Mach 6 by French hip hop artist MC Solaar, and the 2nd single. It became a Top Forty hit in France in July. The song describes life in India, and speaks of many cultural aspects. It also remarks upon the physical location of India and neighboring countries (e.g. Pakistan, Bangladesh).
