= The Sound of Violence (song) =

Single by Cassius

from the album Au Rêve
- Released: October 2002
- Recorded: 2002
- Genre: House
- Length: 3:28
- Label: Virgin France
- Songwriters: Philippe Cerboneschi, Hubert Blanc-Francard & Stephen Neil Edwards.

Cassius singles chronology
"I'm a Woman" (2002)	"The Sound of Violence" (2002)	"Thrilla" (2003)

"The Sound of Violence" is a song by French electro duo Cassius from the album Au Rêve. It is their only single to reach number one in the United States dance charts. Vocals were provided by Steve Edwards.

== Track listings ==
12"

A1. Reggae Rock mix – 3:28
B1. Two Minute Warning club mix (remix by Narcotic Thrust) – 7:35
B2. Dancefloor Killa remix (remix by David Guetta & Joachim Garraud)

CD

1. Original radio edit
2. Narcotic Thrust's Two Minute Warning club mix
3. Cosmo Vitelli remix
4. David Guetta & Joachim Garraud Dancefloor Killa remix

=== 2011 version ===
From Discogs

1. "The Sound of Violence" (2011 remastered version) – 7:12
2. "The Sound of Violence" (Cassius Rawkers 2011 remix) – 8:24
3. "The Sound of Violence" (Franco Cinelli Remix) – 9:20
4. "The Sound of Violence" (Luciano remix) – 8:22
5. "The Sound of Violence" (Aeroplane remix) – 7:02
6. "The Sound of Violence" (Tha Trickaz remix) – 5:10

== Music video ==
The music video is particularly noteworthy for its use of stop animation. The film was produced with heavy use of digital editing techniques and CGI. Some of these examples include rotoscoped patterns in the grass and the continuity of the sky and clouds between the frames. At many points CGI is used to enhance the landscape to a fantasy-like level, and by the end of the film the landscape is completely replaced by abstract blobs and cubes.

== Charts ==
=== Weekly charts ===
Chart (2002–03)	Peak position
Australia (ARIA)	140
Belgium (Ultratip Bubbling Under Flanders)	8
Belgium (Ultratip Bubbling Under Wallonia)	9
Hungary (Single Top 40)	12
Italy (FIMI)	50
Netherlands (Dutch Top 40)	17
Netherlands (Single Top 100)	29
Scotland Singles (OCC)	57
Spain (Promusicae)	4
Switzerland (Schweizer Hitparade)	79
UK Singles (OCC)	49
UK Dance (OCC)	3
US Billboard Hot Dance Club Play	1

=== Year-end charts ===
Chart (2003)	Position
Netherlands (Dutch Top 40)	97
