= Toop Toop =

Single by Cassius

from the album 15 Again
- Released: July 14, 2006
- Recorded: 2006
- Genre: Indie rock, dance rock
- Length: 2:54
- Label: Virgin Records/EMI
- Songwriters: Philippe Cerboneschi, Hubert Blanc-Francard, Mathieu Arnaud Chedid

Cassius singles chronology
"Thrilla" (2003)	"Toop Toop" (2006)

"Toop Toop" is a song by French electronic music duo Cassius. It was released in 2006 as the lead single from the Cassius' album 15 Again. The song combines Clash-style guitar riffs, dance beats and megaphone distorted vocals.

In 2008, Madonna used the song's riff for her performance of "Into the Groove", part of the Sticky & Sweet Tour. The song has been used as part of the soundtrack of Il Divo, an Italian film by director Paolo Sorrentino. The song can also be found on David Guetta's compilation CD Fuck Me I'm Famous - Ibiza Mix 06.

== Track listing ==
1. "Toop Toop" (radio edit) – 2:54
2. "La Notte" – 5:54

== Charts ==
Chart (2006)	Peak position
Belgium (Ultratip Bubbling Under Flanders)	2
Belgium (Ultratip Bubbling Under Wallonia)	3
France (SNEP)	39
Italy (FIMI)	35
Switzerland (Schweizer Hitparade)	76
UK Dance (OCC)	9
