= Paradisiaque =

Studio album by MC Solaar
- Released: June 17, 1997
- Recorded: 1996–1997
- Genre: Rap
- Length: 59:53
- Label: Polydor
- Producer: Boom Bass; Philippe Zdar; DJ Mehdi

MC Solaar chronology
Prose Combat (1994)	Paradisiaque (1997)	MC Solaar (album) (1998)

Professional ratings
Review scores
Source	Rating
AllMusic	3/5 stars
Robert Christgau	(1-star Honorable Mention)
Daily Mirror	8/10
NME	5/10

Paradisiaque is the third album by the French musician MC Solaar, released in 1997.

== Critical reception ==
The Guardian called the album an "erudite but musically uneven variation on le rap francais." The Daily Mirror deemed it "one of the funkiest albums you'll ever hear." Skiing concluded that "Solaar mounts a ferocious lyrical attack, arguably stringing together more rhyming syllables than any other MC at work today."

AllMusic wrote that Solaar's "good sense of melody turns the best moments of the album into fine pop-rap that is entertaining even if you don't understand French."

== Track listing ==
1. Intro - :32
2. Paradisiaque - 3:12
3. Gangster Moderne - 4:05
4. Tournicoti - 3:49
5. Zoom - 3:53
6. Le Sens De La Vie - 4:05
7. Dakota - 3:58
8. Illico Presto - 4:23
9. Les Temps Changent - 3:18
10. Daydreamin' - 4:51
11. Les Boys Bandent - 3:18
12. Les Pensées Sont Des Flowers - 4:02
13. Wonderbra (featuring Bambi Cruz) - 4:02
14. Le 11 Choc - 3:33
15. Protège-Tibia - 4:12
16. Quand Le Soleil Devient Froid - 3:51
17. Outro - :34

== Certifications ==
Region	Certification	Certified units/sales
Belgium (BRMA)	Gold	25,000^{*}
France (SNEP)	Platinum	300,000^{*}
Switzerland (IFPI Switzerland)	Gold	25,000^{^}
^{*} Sales figures based on certification alone.^{^} Shipments figures based on certification alone.
