= 1999 (Cassius album) =

Studio album by Cassius
- Released: 25 January 1999
- Recorded: 1998
- Genre: French house
- Length: 66:21
- Label: Virgin
- Producers: Philippe Zdar; Boombass

Cassius chronology
1999 (1999)	Au Rêve (2002)

Singles from 1999
- 1. "Cassius 1999" Released: 1999; 2. "Feeling for You" Released: 1999; 3. "La Mouche" Released: 1999

1999 is the debut studio album by French electronic music duo Cassius, released on 25 January 1999 by Virgin Records.

== Background ==
The album was written and produced by Cassius members Philippe Zdar and Boombass.

1999 reached number 28 on the UK Albums Chart. As of September 2006, the album has shipped 260,000 units worldwide according to their label.

== Reception ==
Professional ratings
Review scores
Source	Rating
AllMusic	4/5 stars
Melody Maker	4/5 stars
Pitchfork	4.8/10

John Bush of AllMusic qualified the album as "A sleek and intelligent dance record", while James P. Wisdom of Pitchfork wrote: "Maybe I need some coke to truly delight in the seething vacancy of 1999, but I'm pretty sure that it's clearly not happening."

The title track ranked number 26 on the 1999 year-end to Music & Media's Border Breakers, a European airplay chart for performances outside of a song's country of label signing.

== Track listings ==
All tracks are written by Zdar and Boombass; additional writers noted.

No.	Title	Writer(s)	Length
1.	"Cassius 1999"		3:45
2.	"Feeling for You"	Burden; Williams; Wright	4:37
3.	"Crazy Legs"		4:06
4.	"La Mouche"		4:40
5.	"Chase"		1:58
6.	"Foxxy"	Hutch	6:07
7.	"Planetz"		2:46
8.	"Hey Babe"		4:24
9.	"Mister Eveready"		6:06
10.	"Nulife"	Richards; Haggatt; Siders; Brown; Jones	6:31
11.	"Interlude"		1:22
12.	"Somebody"		4:55
13.	"Club Soixante Quinze"		5:21
14.	"Supa Crush"		4:43
15.	"Invisible"		1:09
16.	"Cassius 99 Remix" (radio edit)	Danny Sembello; David Batteau; Michael Sembello	3:32

Deluxe edition
No.	Title	Length
17.	"Foxxy" (DJ Tool remix)	7:23
18.	"Club 73"	3:57
19.	"La Mouche" (DJ Falcon metal mix)	8:58
20.	"Feeling for You" (Reveries Digitales Dreamix / short remix)	5:16
21.	"Feeling for You" (Cambridge Circus mix by DJ Mehdi)	6:36

Sample credits

- "Feeling for You" contains a sample of "Something" by Al Green in the intro, a sample of "All This Love That I'm Giving" by Gwen McCrae, and a drum sample of "Got to Have It" by the Soul President
- "Crazy Legs" contains a sample of "B-Boys Beware" by Two Sisters
- "La Mouche" contains a sample of "Thousand Finger Man" by Candido
- "Foxxy" contains each sample of "Foxy Brown Theme" and "Chase" by Willie Hutch
- "Planetz" contains a sample of "The Planets of Life" by the Whispers
- "Mister Eveready" contains a sample of "Ghetto Heaven" by the Family Stand
- "Nulife" contains a sample of "Precious Woman" by Dynamic Corvettes
- "Somebody" contains a sample of "DWYCK" by Gang Starr featuring Nice & Smooth
- "Cassius 1999 Remix" contains a sample of "[If It] Hurts Just a Little" by Donna Summer
- "La Mouche" (DJ Falcon Metal Mix) contains samples from "The Rock Is Hot" by Crown Heights Affair and "Just Us" by Two Tons O' Fun

== Charts ==
Chart (1999)	Peak position
Australian Albums (ARIA)	76
Belgian Albums (Ultratop Flanders)	22
Dutch Albums (Album Top 100)	82
French Albums (SNEP)	11
Norwegian Albums (VG-lista)	30
Swedish Albums (Sverigetopplistan)	49
UK Albums (Official Charts)	28
