= Mashallah (disambiguation) =

Mashallah (also Ma sha Allah) is an Islamic phrase that expresses appreciation, joy, praise, or thankfulness. It may refer to:

== People ==
- Mashallah Abdullayev (born 1950), Azerbaijani military serviceman
- Mashalla Ahmadov (born 1959), Azerbaijani footballer
- Mashallah Amin Sorour (1931–2010), Iranian cyclist
- Mashallah ibn Athari (c.740–815), Persian astronomer
- Mashallah Shamsolvaezin, Iranian journalist

== Other ==
- Mashaallah (horse)

== See also ==
- Inshallah (disambiguation)
