= 15 Again =

Studio album by Cassius
- Released: 11 September 2006
- Recorded: 2006
- Genres: French house; electro
- Length: 58:27
- Labels: EMI Records; Virgin Records
- Producers: Zdar; Boombass

Cassius chronology
Au Rêve (2002)	15 Again (2006)	The Rawkers E.P. (2010)

Singles from 15 Again
- 1. "Toop Toop" Released: 14 July 2006; 2. "Rock Number One" Released: 1 June 2007

15 Again is the third album by French electronic duo Cassius, released on 11 September 2006 by EMI Records and Virgin Records. It was released in the United States by Astralwerks in 2007.

== Writing, recording and production ==
The album was written and produced by Cassius members Phillippe Zdar and Boombass and was recorded in three weeks in Ibiza. It includes a collaboration with hip hop producer and performer Pharrell Williams. Other collaborators include Sébastien Tellier, -M-, Etienne de Crécy and Le Knight Club (electronic duo composed of Guy-Manuel de Homem-Christo and Eric Chedeville).

== Critical reception ==
Professional ratings
Aggregate scores
Source	Rating
Metacritic	84/100
Review scores
Source	Rating
Entertainment Weekly	B+
musicOMH	5/5 stars
Pitchfork	7.2/10
Spin	3/5 stars
Uncut	4/5 stars
Under the Radar	8/10

Metacritic, which assigns a normalised rating out of 100 to reviews from mainstream critics, reported an average score of 84 based on 6 reviews, described as "universal acclaim". Entertainment Weekly describes the album production as, "pair[ing] fuzzy beats with sleek, Steely Dan-inspired, soft-rock stylings."

== Track listing ==
All tracks are written by Zdar and Boombass; additional writers noted.

No.	Title	Writer(s)	Length
1.	"Toop Toop"		2:47
2.	"Rock Number One"	Gladys Gambie	3:36
3.	"This Song"		4:50
4.	"15 Again"	Etienne de Crécy; Gambie	3:00
5.	"All I Want"	Gambie	3:55
6.	"Eye Water"	Pharrell Williams	5:32
7.	"See Me Now"	Guy-Manuel de Homem-Christo; Eric Chedeville	3:52
8.	"A Mile From Here"		3:53
9.	"Jackrock"		9:30
10.	"Cactus"	de Crécy	8:02
11.	"La Notte"		5:54
12.	"Cria Cuervos"		3:38
Total length:			58:27

Deluxe edition
No.	Title	Length
13.	"Toop Toop (Mr Oizo Mix)"	3:31
14.	"Toop Toop (Martin Eyerer Remix)"	6:57
15.	"Toop Toop (Oliver Koletzki Mix)"	6:12
16.	"Rock Number One (Leopold Gregori Remix)"	6:41
17.	"Rock Number One (K.I.M Remix)"	5:48

=== US version ===
The US version released by HBF/Justice replaces "Cria Cuervos" with "Shame Shame Chérie" in a slightly different order:

No.	Title	Length
11.	"Shame Shame Chérie"	8:32
12.	"La Notte"	5:54

== Charts ==
Chart (2006)	Peak position
Belgian Albums (Ultratop Flanders)	57
Belgian Albums (Ultratop Wallonia)	57
French Albums (SNEP)	44
Italian Albums (FIMI)	95
