= Mach 6 (album) =

2003 album by MC Solaar

Studio album by MC Solaar
- Released: December 01, 2003
- Recorded: 2003
- Genre: Hip hop
- Length: 56:30
- Label: Wea International; Sentinel Quest

MC Solaar chronology
Cinquième As (2001)	Mach 6 (2003)	Chapitre 7 (2007)

Professional ratings
Review scores
Source	Rating
Allmusic	3/5 stars
Le Parisien	2/4 stars
The Observer	3/5 stars

Mach 6 is the sixth studio album by MC Solaar. It was released in Europe in 2003 and in the United States on June 6, 2006.

== Track listing ==
1. "Introspection" – 1:05
2. "La Vie est belle" – 3:53
3. "Hijo de Africa" – 3:23
4. "T’inquiète (intro)" – 0:33
5. "T’inquiète" – 4:02
6. "Guerilla" – 3:48
7. "Jumelles" – 3:46
8. "Jardin d’Éden" – 2:47
9. "Au pays de Gandhi" – 3:32
10. "J’connais mon rôle" – 3:22
11. "Cash Money" – 4:00
12. "Today Is a Good Day" (feat. Darina) – 3:13
13. "Souvenir" – 2:51
14. "Sauvez le monde" – 5:16
15. "Bling Bling" – 3:17
16. "Ça me hante" – 7:45

== Certifications ==
Region	Certification	Certified units/sales
France (SNEP)	Platinum	300,000^{*}
^{*} Sales figures based on certification alone.
