= Dreems =

Studio album by Cassius
- Released: 21 June 2019
- Genres: French house; electro
- Length: 100:28
- Label: Virgin Records
- Producer: Cassius

Cassius chronology
Ibifornia (Remixes) (2017)	Dreems (2019)	Best Of 1996–2019 (2024)

Dreems is the fifth and final studio album by French electronic duo Cassius, released on 21 June 2019 by Virgin Records.

== History ==
On the release day, it was announced that the album would be the final album from Cassius, after one of their members, Philippe "Zdar" Cerboneschi, had died at the age of 52, after accidentally falling from a building in Paris two days before the album's release, on 19 June 2019.

== Reception ==
Professional ratings
Review scores
Source	Rating
Le Soir	3/4 stars
MusicOMH	4/5 stars
Pitchfork	7.8/10

Dreems received positive reviews upon release. Noah Yoo of Pitchfork mourns Zdar, stating, "It is an immense tragedy that Zdar didn't get to witness the release of this album with Boombass; the two had been steadfast creative partners ever since they were young studio rats trying to scrape together enough experience to make the music they heard in their heads." He then states, "Cassius may come to a close, but in Dreems, they offer a worthy capstone for a well-lived life: a celebration of love, an uncynical outburst of the kind of joy that feels rarer to come by with each passing day."

Ben Devlin of MusicOMH admits, "Dreems is not a perfect album – too much of the opening stretch is spent in a transitory stage between one interesting moment and another – but it is sequenced with remarkable attention to detail for a very cohesive 50-minute experience." He also hopes that Zdar's bandmate Boombass "can gain some solace from people's enjoyment of this work, a testament to [his and Zdar's] freewheeling style and sense of fun which has lasted through the decades."

== Track listing ==
No.	Title	Writer(s)	Length
1.	"Summer"	Zdar; Boombass	3:00
2.	"Nothing About You" (featuring John Gourley)	Zdar; Boombass; Gourley	4:19
3.	"Vedra"	Zdar; Boombass	2:37
4.	"Fame"	Zdar; Boombass	4:08
5.	"Don't Let Me Be" (featuring Owelle)	Zdar; Boombass; France Picoulet	3:44
6.	"Chuffed"	Zdar; Boombass; Picoulet	3:05
7.	"Rock Non Stop"	Zdar; Boombass	5:12
8.	"Cause oui!" (featuring Mike D)	Zdar; Boombass; Mike D	2:20
9.	"Dreams" (featuring Owelle, Luke Jenner, and Joe Rogers)	Zdar; Boombass; Picoulet; Jenner	4:47
10.	"Calliope"	Zdar; Boombass	6:04
11.	"W18" (featuring Vula Malinga)	Zdar; Boombass; Jocelyn Brown	5:41
12.	"Walking in the Sunshine" (featuring Owelle)	Zdar; Boombass; Picoulet	5:17
13.	"Dreems (Continuous Mix)"	Zdar; Boombass	50:14

== Charts ==
Chart (2019)	Peak position
Belgian Albums (Ultratop Flanders)	124
Belgian Albums (Ultratop Wallonia)	54
French Albums (SNEP)	30
Swiss Albums (Schweizer Hitparade)	81
UK Dance Albums (Official Charts)	14
