= Prose Combat =

Studio album by MC Solaar
- Released: 9 February 1994
- Recorded: 1993–1994
- Genre: Jazz rap
- Length: 55:52
- Label: Cohiba
- Producer: Jimmy Jay

MC Solaar chronology
Qui Sème le Vent Récolte le Tempo (1991)	Prose Combat (1994)	Paradisiaque (1997)

Professional ratings
Review scores
Source	Rating
AllMusic	4/5 stars
The Guardian	3/4 stars
Music Week	5/5 stars
Pitchfork	8.0/10
Q	4/5 stars
Record Collector	4/5 stars
Rolling Stone	4/5 stars

Prose Combat is the second studio album by French rapper MC Solaar, released in 1994 by Cohiba Records. Its success propelled him to international fame.

An outtake from the album sessions was "Comme dans un film" (falsely known as "John Woo"). This song was featured on the album La Haine – musique inspirees du film (La Haine – music inspired by the film).

== Track listing ==
=== French and US editions ===
1. "Aubade" (Jimmy Jay, MC Solaar) – 0:35
2. "Obsolète" (Jay) – 3:02
3. "Nouveau western" (Gainsbourg, MC Solaar) – 4:34; samples "Bonnie and Clyde" by Serge Gainsbourg
4. "À la claire fontaine" (Jay, M'Barali) – 2:59
5. "Superstarr" (MC Solaar) – 3:03
6. "La concubine de l'hémoglobine" (Jay, M'Barali) – 4:49
7. "Dévotion" (MC Solaar) – 4:26
8. "Temps Mort" (Jay, MC Solaar) – 3:41
9. "L'NMIACCd'HTCK72KPDP" (Les Sages Poètes De La Rue) – 5:04
10. "Séquelles" (Barali, Jay) – 3:37
11. "Dieu ait son âme" (Barali, Pigale Boom Bass) – 4:46
12. "À dix de mes disciples" (MC Solaar) – 3:45
13. "La fin justifie les moyens" (MC Solaar) – 4:57
14. "Relations humaines" (Bambi, MC Solaar) – 3:28
15. "Prose combat" (Jay, M'Barali) – 3:06

=== UK edition ===
The UK edition replaces "Obsolète", "L'NMIACCd'HTCK72KPDP", and "Dieu ait son âme" with "Le free style d'obsolète", "Solaar Power", and "I'm Doin' Fine", respectively. The sequence of the tracks was also altered.

1. "Aubade" (Jimmy Jay, MC Solaar) – 0:35
2. "Le free style d'obsolète" (Jimmy Jay, MC Solaar) – 6:00
3. "À la claire fontaine" (Jay, M'Barali) – 2:59
4. "Superstarr" (MC Solaar) – 3:03
5. "Solaar Power" (JP "Bluey" Maunick, MC Solaar) – 4:51
6. "Relations humaines" (Bambi, MC Solaar) – 3:28
7. "Nouveau western" (Gainsbourg, MC Solaar) – 4:34
8. "La concubine de l'hémoglobine" (Jay, M'Barali) – 4:49
9. "Dévotion" (MC Solaar) – 4:26
10. "Séquelles" (Barali, Jay) – 3:37
11. "I'm Doin' Fine" (Storch, Thompson, Malik, Trotter, Hubbard) – 8:19
12. "À dix de mes disciples" (MC Solaar) – 3:45
13. "La fin justifie les moyens" (MC Solaar) – 4:57
14. "Temps mort" (Jay, MC Solaar) – 3:41
15. "Prose combat" (Jay, M'Barali) – 3:06

== Personnel ==
- Boom Bass – scratching, sampling
- Jimmy Jay – scratching, production
- Kiwi – voices
- MC Solaar – vocals
- Sinclair – harmony vocals
- Laurent Vernerey – bass
- Derin Young – vocals, harmony vocals

== Charts ==
=== Weekly charts ===
Chart (1994–1995)	Peak position
Austrian Albums (Ö3 Austria)	28
Belgian Albums (Ultratop Wallonia)	31
German Albums (Offizielle Top 100)	81
Swiss Albums (Schweizer Hitparade)	12

Chart (2021)	Peak position
Belgian Albums (Ultratop Wallonia)	6

=== Year-end charts ===
Chart (1994)	Position
Swiss Albums (Schweizer Hitparade)	50
Chart (1995)	Position
Belgian Albums (Ultratop Wallonia)	40

== Certifications ==
Region	Certification	Certified units/sales
Belgium (BRMA)	Gold	25,000^{*}
France (SNEP)	2× Gold	200,000^{*}
Switzerland (IFPI Switzerland)	Gold	25,000^{^}
^{*} Sales figures based on certification alone.^{^} Shipments figures based on certification alone.
