= Chapitre 7 =

Studio album by MC Solaar
- Released: June 18, 2007
- Recorded: 2006–2007
- Genre: Hip hop
- Label: Warners

MC Solaar chronology
Mach 6 (2003)	Chapitre 7 (2007)	Magnum 567 (2010)

Professional ratings
Review scores
Source	Rating
Allmusic	3.5/5 stars

Chapitre 7 is the seventh studio album by MC Solaar. The album was released worldwide on June 18, 2007. The album was recorded in New York over an eight-month period. The first single, "Da Vinci Claude", was released in March 2007, and the corresponding video in April 2007. In the song, Solaar relates subjects as political lies. MC Solaar stated in an interview that he did not expect his return to the studio. After the partial success of Mach 6, he wanted to take a break and made trips from Island to the United States. While on tour in the United Kingdom, he realized that he wanted to work with musicians and make music that was different from contemporary French rap. Chapitre 7 mixes the musical styles of rock, rap, salsa and pop. In the album, MC Solaar speaks out about global problems such as war in Africa and child soldiers.

== Track listing ==
1. "Intreau" – 1:08
2. "Carpe Diem" – 4:10
3. "Paris-Samba" – 4:00
4. "Clic clic" – 2:52
5. "Da Vinci Claude" – 3:24
6. "In God We Trust" – 2:41
7. "Coup d'œil dans le métro" – 3:33
8. "Si on t'demande" – 2:55
9. "Au clair de la lune" – 4:00
10. "Non merci" – 3:14
11. "Sous les Palmiers" – 3:00
12. "Mollah Solaar remix" – 3:54
13. "L'Auberge du Bouleau Blanc" – 3:31
14. "Ben Oui" – 3:23
15. "Avec les loups" – 3:02
16. "Merci" – 2:01
17. "Impact avec le diable" – 3:30
18. "Outro" – 2:07

== Personnel ==
- Michel Alibo – Basse
- Philippe Bordas – Photography
- Guillaume Eyango – Choeurs
- Eric K-Roz – Choeurs

== Certifications ==
Region	Certification	Certified units/sales
France (SNEP)	Gold	75,000^{*}
^{*} Sales figures based on certification alone.
