= MC Solaar (album) =

Studio album by MC Solaar
- Released: July 21, 1998
- Recorded: 1997–1998
- Genre: Rap
- Length: 37:18
- Label: Polygram International
- Producers: Boom Bass; Philippe Zdar; DJ Mehdi; Da Beatminerz

MC Solaar chronology
Paradisiaque (1997)	MC Solaar (1998)	Le Tour De La Question (1998)

Professional ratings
Review scores
Source	Rating
Allmusic	link

MC Solaar is the self-titled fourth album (released July 1998) by French-Senegalese rapper, MC Solaar. It was a shorter effort than his previous releases. Following the funk-grooved sounds of Paradisiaque, the production style once again changed, to essentially an album of two halves. The first half was reminiscent of his previous effort, with Boom Bass and Phillip Zdar producing the tracks, while the latter half shifting to a grittier, east coast U.S. hip-hop sound. Two of these tracks ("Message de l'ange" and "Je me souviens") were produced by DJ Evil Dee of Da Beatminerz, known for his work with the Boot Camp Clik. While different from what fans were used to, Solaar appeared to have no trouble following this new sound.

== Track listing ==
1. "Onzième Commandement" – 3:21
2. "Galaktika" – 3:09
3. "La 5ème Saison" – 3:57
4. "Perfect" – 3:43
5. "Les Songes" – 1:22
6. "Vie N'Est Qu'un Moment" – 4:00
7. "Vigipirap" – 3:30
8. "Message de l'Ange" – 4:27
9. "Nouvelle Genèse" – 3:27
10. "Je Me Souviens (Flash-Back)" – 3:36
11. "L'Argent Ne Fait Pas le Bonheur" – 2:57
