= Neuhof, Strasbourg =

Coordinates: 48.5402°N 7.7680°E

Neuhof (literally new land or new farm) is a suburb in the southern district of the French city of Strasbourg. Administratively, it is part of "Neuhof, Stockfeld, Ganzau" one of the ten districts of Strasbourg.

Neuhof's borders are Meinau to the west, the Neudorf railway to the north, the Rhine and the forest of Neuhof (part of the natural reserve of the "massif forestier de Strasbourg-Neuhof/Illkirch-Graffenstaden") to the east and south, and the commune of Illkirch-Graffenstaden to the southwest. Between the Rhine and Neuhof falls part of the port of the Rhine, autonomous section of Strasbourg, with its many port "darse"s created during the 1950s.

First mention of the name "Neue Hoff" was in 1424 for citing the creation of a farm within the domain of a village of Hundsfelden on the outskirts of Rhine.

Neuhof is divided into three principal regions: Neuhof village, the historical ancient part of the district, Stockfeld to the south, an area gained from the nearby forest to relocate some of the population from the "village" to newer locations starting 1910 and the Nouveau Stockfeld built starting 1930s, to the west of old Stockfeld.

In the 1960s, highly condensed social housing projects were built for lower income earners and densely populated by immigrant populations, mostly from Turkey and the Maghreb. The badly maintained projects quickly degenerated into unfavourable living conditions, drug and crime-ridden environments. The area was also witness of highly mediatized riots and confrontations with French police.

Starting 2001, Neuhof has been witnessing a great renovation project and since 2007, has been served by the extension of tramway service from Strasbourg. To the north of Neuhof is the independent Polygone quarter, with its "Polygone cemetery" and a small airport known as "Aérodrome de Strasbourg-Neuhof".

== Bibliography ==
- Charles Cuvier: Notice historique sur l'Établissement du Neuhof, depuis son origine en 1825 jusqu'en 1837, Silbermann G., Strasbourg 1837, 31 p.
- Various authors: Neuhof, un village aux portes de Strasbourg: Son âme, ses souvenirs, ses réalisations, Editions Coprur, Strasbourg 1996, 320 p.
