= Qui sème le vent récolte le tempo =

Studio album by MC Solaar
- Released: 15 October 1991
- Recorded: 1990–1991
- Genre: French hip hop
- Length: 51:41
- Label: Musicrama
- Producer: Jimmy Jay

MC Solaar chronology
Qui sème le vent récolte le tempo (1991)	Prose Combat (1994)

Professional ratings
Review scores
Source	Rating
AllMusic	4/5 stars
Record Collector	4/5 stars

Qui sème le vent récolte le tempo is the debut studio album by French rapper MC Solaar. The album title is a pun on the French version of the Biblical proverb "qui sème le vent récolte la tempête" (he who sows the wind reaps the whirlwind, Hosea 8:7). It was released in 1991 and gained considerable success.

"Bouge de là" was the album's first single, which was hugely successful in France and went on to kickstart Solaar's career there. The song is based on a sample of "The Message" by 1970s English band Cymande.

The title song "Qui sème le vent récolte le tempo" samples Lou Donaldson's "One Cylinder".

Other popular singles from the album are "Caroline" and "Victime de la mode".

== Track listing ==
1. "Intro" (instrumental)
2. "Qui sème le vent récolte le tempo"
3. "Matière grasse contre matière grise"
4. "Victime de la mode"
5. "L'histoire de l'art"
6. "Armand est mort"
7. "Quartier nord"
8. "Interlude" (instrumental)
9. "A temps partiel"
10. "Caroline"
11. "La musique adoucit les mœurs"
12. "Bouge de là (part. 1)"
13. "Bouge de là (part. 2) (impro)"
14. "Ragga Jam (impro)"
15. "La devise"
16. "Funky Dreamer" (instrumental)

== Charts ==
Chart performance for Qui sème le vent récolte le tempo
Chart (2021)	Peak position
Belgian Albums (Ultratop Wallonia)	6
Swiss Albums (Schweizer Hitparade)	37

== Certifications ==
Region	Certification	Certified units/sales
France (SNEP)	Platinum	300,000^{*}
Switzerland (IFPI Switzerland)	Gold	25,000^{^}
^{*} Sales figures based on certification alone.^{^} Shipments figures based on certification alone.
