= Solaar pleure =

"Solaar Pleure"

Single by MC Solaar

from the album Cinquième As
- Released: January 16, 2001
- Genre: Hip hop
- Length: 4:54
- Label: Warner M.
- Songwriters: MC Solaar; Eric K-Roz; Alain J
- Producer: Black Rose

MC Solaar singles chronology
"Solaar Pleure" (2001)	"Hasta la vista" (2001)

"Solaar pleure" ("Solaar weeps") is the 2nd song on the 2001 album Cinquième As by French hip hop artist MC Solaar, and the 1st single. The song is dubbed over in English at the close of the album. The rapper relates his feelings about the current state of the world including his views on poverty and AIDS.

It also provides an allegorical journey after death, going from the expectation of heaven to shock at being sent to hell. This divides the song into two parts as the "heaven" section fades away and then the song begins again with "Non! Pourquoi moi? C'est une erreur! Garde-moi, je suis noble de cœur!" (No! Why me? It's a mistake! Keep me, I am noble at heart) as he is sent to hell.

First release embedded with Opendisc technology.

== Track listings ==
CD single

1. "Solaar pleure" — 4:57
2. "C'est ça que les gens veulent" by MC Solaar featuring 9respect — 4:05

CD maxi

1. "Solaar pleure" — 4:57
2. "C'est ça que les gens veulent" by MC Solaar featuring 9respect — 4:05
3. "Arkansas" — 1:39

12" maxi

1. "Solaar pleure" — 4:57
2. "C'est ça que les gens veulent" by MC Solaar featuring 9respect — 4:05
3. "Arkansas" — 1:39

12" maxi - Promo - UK

1. "Solaar pleure" (English version) — 4:54
2. "Solaar pleure" (instrumental) — 4:54
3. "Solaar pleure" (French version) — 4:54
4. "Solaar pleure" (a cappella) — 4:34

== Personnel ==
- Lyrics : MC Solaar
- Mastered by Black Rose Corporation, Chris Gerhinger
- Mixed by Stephen George
- Music : Alain J, Eric K-Roz
- Photography : Philippe Bordas
- Producer : Black Rose Corporation
- Recorded and mixed by Black Rose Corporation

== Certifications ==
Country	Certification	Date	Sales certified
France	Gold	July 4, 2001	250,000

== Charts ==
=== Weekly charts ===
Chart (2001)	Peak position
Belgium (Ultratop 50 Wallonia)	2
France (SNEP)	4
Switzerland (Schweizer Hitparade)	22

=== Year-end charts ===
Chart (2001)	Position
Belgium (Ultratop Wallonia)	10
Europe (Eurochart Hot 100)	66
France (SNEP)	19
Switzerland (Schweizer Hitparade)	100
