= Cinquième As =

Studio album by MC Solaar
- Released: 2001
- Recorded: 2001
- Genre: Rap
- Length: 65:22
- Labels: Wea International; Elektra
- Producers: Eric K-Roz and Alain J of The Black Rose Corporation; DJ Sample; DJ Mac; DJ Pep

MC Solaar chronology
MC Solaar (1998)	Cinquième As (2001)	Mach 6 (2003)

Professional ratings
Review scores
Source	Rating
Allmusic	2/5 stars

Cinquième As is the fifth studio album by MC Solaar, and was released in 2001. It is slightly different from his previous works because of a stronger emphasis on a string background. The album gained exposure in the United States after "La Belle et le Bad Boy" was heard on an episode of Sex and the City. Musically, the album features more R&B themes featuring a layering of a female voice on a few tracks, and it is especially notable and true to the MC Solaar character which is strong emotion expressed in the delivery and lyrics. The album pays tribute to Senegal, where he spent his childhood. He uses the album to condemn the role of the World Bank in developing nations. This is most apparent on the track "Les Colonies," where the lyrics state, "Dans cette ère de négoce où ne vivent que les big boss/ Rentabilité - instabilité - imbécillité/ N'ont fait qu'augmenter les taux de mortalité," meaning, "In this era of trade where only the big bosses live/ Profitability - instability - imbecility/ Have done nothing but increase rates of mortality," referring to policies of the International Monetary Fund and World Bank.

MC Solaar also discusses the condition of African immigrants in France. He himself emigrated with his family to the suburbs of Paris as a teenager, and he talks about this experience in the song "Leve-toi et rap". MC Solaar's message is seen throughout the lyrics and the visual design of the album. The album cover is a picture of a group of men, including the artist himself, all shirtless, as if trying to convey an image of slaves about to embark on a slave ship. However, upon taking a closer look, it appears that the men are African wrestlers. The theme of wrestling and fighters pays homage to the African presence in France.

== Track listing ==
1. Introdiction – 1:53
2. "Solaar Pleure" – 4:57
3. "Lève-Toi et Rap" – 3:29
4. "Les Colonies" – 4:01
5. "Hasta la vista" (intro) – 0:15
6. "Hasta la vista" – 3:23 -Produced by Kurser/ Fabrice
7. "La Belle et le Bad Boy" – 3:12 -Produced by Kurser/ Fabrice
8. "La La La, La" – 3:51 -Produced by Kurser/ Fabrice
9. "Arkansas" – 1:39
10. "Baby Love" – 4:07
11. "Dégâts collatéraux" – 4:00 -Produced by Kurser/ Fabrice
12. "RMI" – 4:19
13. "C'est ça que les gens veulent" (feat. 9respect) – 4:05
14. "L'aigle ne chasse pas les mouches" – 3:12 -co-Produced by Kurser/ Fabrice
15. "Hiphopaloorap" (feat. Don Xeré Delavega) – 1:45
16. "Le Cinquième As" – 3:48 -Produced by Kurser/ Fabrice
17. "Playmate" – 3:02
18. "L'homme qui voulait 3 milliards" (feat. Bambi Cruz) – 3:03
19. "Si je meurs ce soir" (feat. Black Jack) – 3:59
20. "Samedi Soir" (hidden track) – 2:21

== Charts ==
=== Weekly charts ===
Chart (2001)	Peak position
Belgian Albums (Ultratop Wallonia)	2
French Albums (SNEP)	2
German Albums (Offizielle Top 100)	98
Swiss Albums (Schweizer Hitparade)	5

Chart (2026)	Peak position
Hungarian Physical Albums (MAHASZ)	18

=== Year-end charts ===
Chart (2001)	Position
Belgian Albums (Ultratop Wallonia)	6
French Albums (SNEP)	9
Swiss Albums (Schweizer Hitparade)	55

Chart (2002)	Position
French Albums (SNEP)	91

== Certifications ==
Region	Certification	Certified units/sales
Belgium (BRMA)	Gold	25,000^{*}
France (SNEP)	2× Platinum	600,000^{*}
Switzerland (IFPI Switzerland)	Gold	20,000^{^}
^{*} Sales figures based on certification alone.^{^} Shipments figures based on certification alone.
