= Hasta la Vista (MC Solaar song) =

"Hasta la vista"

Single by MC Solaar

from the album Cinquième As
- B-side: "C'est ça que les gens veulent" (12" maxi)
- Released: May 2001
- Recorded: France
- Genre: Hip hop, R&B
- Length: 3:23
- Label: Sentinel Ouest
- Songwriters: Alain J Eric K-Roz; Claude M'Barali; Kurser
- Producer: Black Rose

MC Solaar singles chronology
"Solaar pleure" (2001)	"Hasta la vista" (2001)	"RMI" (2001)

"Hasta la vista" is a 2001 song recorded by the hip hop artist MC Solaar. It was the second single from his fifth studio album, Cinquième As. Released in May 2001, the song was the first number-one single for the singer in France.

== Lyrics and music ==
Composed by Alain J, Eric K-Roz, Claude M'Barali and Kurser, "Hasta la Vista" was also recorded in Spanish language, which is included on the CD and the vinyl. It contains many puns as well as numerous Latino components, such as the Spanish guitar played by the Italian-French performer Miro, the name of the song and the first verse in Spanish-language, the "atmosphere and the passionate singings of the refrain" performed by Moïra Conrath.

== Chart performances ==
"Hasta la Vista" started at number nine in France on the chart edition of 2 June 2001, then jumped to number one where it stayed for five weeks. It totaled 13 weeks in the top ten, 22 weeks in the top 50 and 27 weeks in the top 100. It was certified Gold disc by the Syndicat National de l'Édition Phonographique two months after its release, and features at number 12 on 2001 annual chart. The song is the first number-one in France which mixes French and Spanish languages and is also MC Solaar's most successful single in France. As of July 2014, it was the 99th best-selling single of the 21st century in France, with 309,000 units sold.

Charted for 17 weeks on the Ultratop 40, the song debuted at number 20 on 16 June 2001, reached the top ten two weeks later, and peaked at number five in its seventh week. It remained for nine weeks in the top ten, then kept on drop on the chart. It ranked at number 31 on the year-end chart. In Switzerland, it debuted at a peak of number 23 on 5 August and fell off the chart after 14 weeks.

== Track listings ==
- CD maxi
1. "Hasta la vista" (intro) – 0:15
2. "Hasta la vista" – 3:23
3. "¡Hasta la vista mi amor!" (intro) – 0:15
4. "¡Hasta la vista mi amor!" – 3:23
- 12" maxi
1. "Hasta la vista" (intro) – 0:15
2. "Hasta la vista" – 3:23
3. "¡Hasta la vista mi amor!" (intro) – 0:15
4. "¡Hasta la vista mi amor!" – 3:23
5. "C'est ça que les gens veulent" – 4:05

== Charts ==
=== Weekly charts ===
Weekly chart performance for "Hasta la Vista"
Chart (2001)	Peak position
Belgium (Ultratop 50 Wallonia)	5
Europe (European Hot 100 Singles)	6
France (SNEP)	1
Switzerland (Schweizer Hitparade)	23

=== Year-end charts ===
Year-end chart performance for "Hasta la Vista"
Chart (2001)	Position
Belgium (Ultratop 50 Wallonia)	31
Europe (Eurochart Hot 100)	64
France (SNEP)	12

== Certifications ==
Certifications for "Hasta la Vista"
Region	Certification	Certified units/sales
France (SNEP)	Gold	250,000^{*}
^{*} Sales figures based on certification alone.
