= MC Solaar =

French rapper

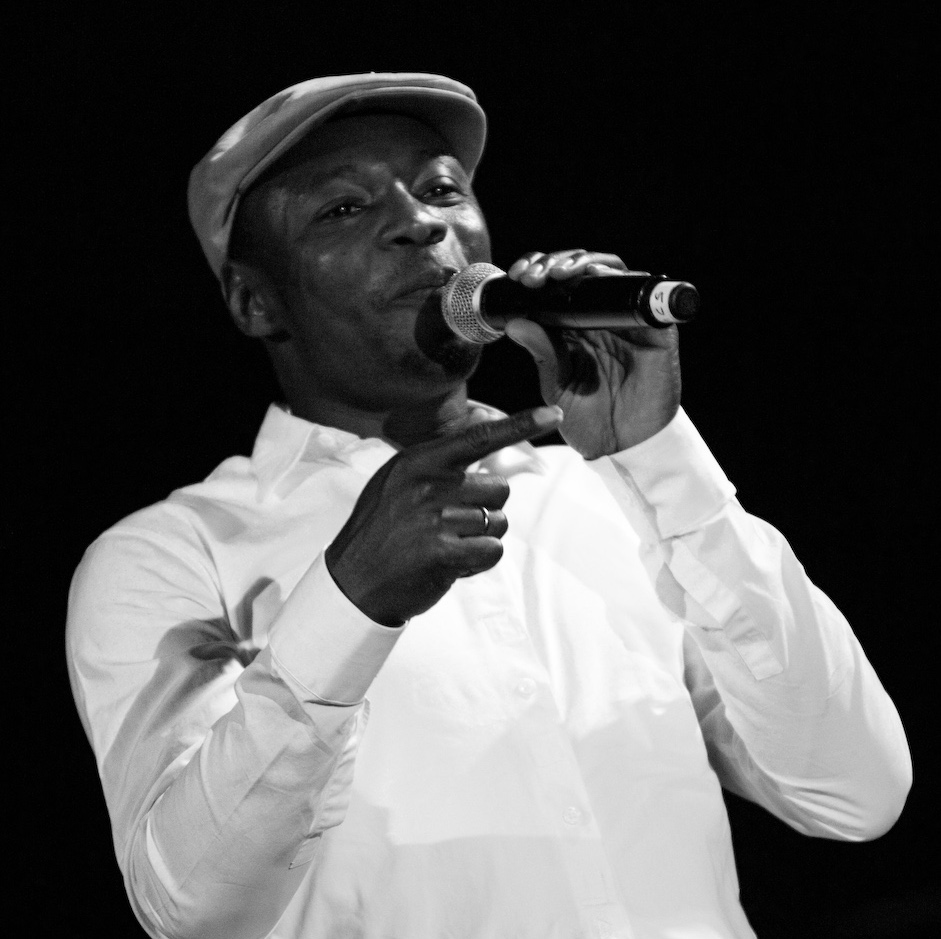
- MC Solaar in 2009

Background information
- Born: Claude Honoré M'Barali; 5 March 1969 (age 57); Dakar, Senegal
- Origin: Saint-Denis, Île-de-France, France
- Genres: French hip-hop; jazz-rap
- Years active: 1988–present
- Labels: Phonogram; Elektra

Claude Honoré M'Barali (French pronunciation: [klod ɔnɔʁe ɛmbaʁali]; born 5 March 1969), professionally known as MC Solaar (pronounced [ɛm si sɔˈlaʁ]), is a French rapper of Senegalese and Chadian origin. He is one of France's most famous and influential hip-hop artists. Some consider him the best French rapper of all time.

MC Solaar is known for his complex lyrics and distinctive flows, which rely on word play, lyricism, and inquiry. In the English-speaking world, Solaar was signed by London-based acid jazz record label Talkin' Loud and recorded with British band Urban Species and rapper Guru, who was a member of New York-based rap duo Gang Starr. Solaar has released twelve studio albums and one live album. His eighth studio album, Géopoétique, produced by Alain Etchart and mixed by sound engineer David Gnozzi, won best album of the year at the Victoires de la Musique awards in 2018.

== Biography ==
=== Early life ===
Claude M'Barali was born in Dakar, Senegal, to parents from Chad. When he was six months old, his parents immigrated to France where they settled in the Parisian suburbs; initially in Saint-Denis, subsequently Maisons-Alfort and finally Villeneuve-Saint-Georges. When he was twelve, he went to live with an uncle in Cairo, Egypt for nine months where he discovered the Universal Zulu Nation and became fascinated with the rapping styles of Afrika Bambaataa. Upon his return to France, he passed the baccalauréat. The constant support from his mother was one of the reasons that he was able to pass the baccalauréat and still make music. He coined the stage name "MC Solaar" during his adolescence from his graffiti tags "SOAR" and "SOLAAR".

MC Solaar describing his early influences before a London gig in 2011, to radio producer Pete Shevlin

He studied languages at the Jussieu university campus and was a postgraduate in philosophy. He released his first single in 1990. MC Solaar went to Paris in the summer of 1991 with his friend Jimmy Jay in hopes of succeeding in the music industry. Success came quickly when his first single, "Bouge de là" ("Get Out of There"), based on a sample from Cymande's song "The Message" (1973) became a hit in the early 1990s. Many rappers who came out of Africa at the time spoke a lot about slavery and other topics in order to bring the history of their people into light. Nevertheless, the song went platinum in France and reached number 5 on the national chart.

=== 1991–1997: Early success and Prose Combat breakthrough ===
After the success of "Bouge de là", Solaar went on to support the American rap group De La Soul when they performed at the Olympia in Paris in September 1991. At the close of 1991, Solaar released Qui Sème le Vent Récolte le Tempo which went on to sell over 400,000 copies in France. With the success of his debut album in France, Solaar embarked upon extensive tours of Poland and Russia. In December 1992, he performed in twelve countries across West Africa, where his French rap style proved popular with African music fans.

MC Solaar released Prose Combat in 1994. It sold 100,000 copies in the first week of being released and became a bestseller in 20 other countries. In February 1995 he received an award for Best Male Singer of the Year at the 10th edition of the French "Victoires de la Musique" awards. Also in 1994, MC Solaar appeared on the Red Hot Organization's compilation album, Stolen Moments: Red Hot + Cool. The album, meant to raise awareness and funds in support of the AIDS epidemic in relation to the African American community, was heralded as Album of the Year by Time.

Solaar returned to the studio in 1997 with longtime friend and producer Jimmy Jay to record his third album, Paradisiaque. The album was another success, which led to an extensive European tour starting on 9 January 1998 at the Zénith in Paris. MC Solaar toured internationally, including Germany, Japan and the United States. He was included as a guest on American rapper Guru's "Jazzmatazz" project and one of Solaar's songs was included in the Tommy Boy rap compilation in the United States.

Early in Solaar's career, it was important for him to share the struggles and the different hardships for black people that had emigrated to France and tried to make a better life. Most of his music was dedicated to enlightening the population of a specific deeper message that connected to him in his life. "[...] he addresses the conditions under which Black people have emigrated to and settled in France. In the piece "Leve-toi et rap," he describes his Chadian parents' migration from Senegal to a Parisian suburb, the main stages of his teenage years and how he finally came to discover rap." In an interview, MC Solaar described the feeling of making a song and the thought process while just writing any part of lyrics that go into his music. "I write quickly, because of the music, he tells me. It's much easier if you have the music, the rhythm, but I am fast. First, I have taken in "everything". Do you never write before the music? Ah. I used to, he admits. But when I met the music, I changed."

=== 1997–2004: Cinquième As and Mach 6 ===
Solaar released Cinquième As in 2001, to critical acclaim and Mach 6 in 2003. In the album's third track, "Lève-Toi et Rap", Solaar describes his parents' move to France as well as his own roots growing up in Villeneuve-Saint-Georges and Cairo. Critic Dan Gennoe attests to Solaar's "flow et vocabulaire" by noting "the flow of his words is staggering, as are the low-slung grooves that they roll to; deftly vaulting all language barriers."

In 1998, MC Solaar embarked on a tour beginning at the Zénith de Paris. The concert he presents is a show with DJs and dancers (as the hip-hop dancer Bintou Dembélé) which overpasses the musical frame. The cover of Cinquieme As depicts Solaar topless, and draws comparisons to captives about to be taken onto a slave ship. However, a look at the inside cover reveals Solaar to be in a wrestler's costume, along with the other men in the picture. As Veronique Helenon discusses in her article concerning the French hip-hop scene, references to Africa and "blackness" are a very important part of Solaar's music. Solaar recognises and pays tribute to the African presence in France by using boxing and wrestling references. Senegalese boxer Battling Siki is referenced in the album's booklet. Although Siki won the light heavyweight boxing championship in 1922, he still faced racism from journalists. This image combined with songs concerning colonial oppression and the migration experience from Africa to France show Solaar's "blackness," something that is extremely important in the French hip-hop scene. For example, in his song "Les Colonies", Solaar discusses the similarities between the oppression of Africans by colonialists to the modern day exploitation of "third world" countries. "Cinquième As" includes lyrics in French, English, and Spanish, which represents his ideals that rap should be inclusive of all people. In early 2004, his 2001 song "La Belle et Le Bad Boy" was featured on the final episode of the U.S. television series Sex and the City. The MTV series "The Hills" featured the song as well.

=== 2005–present: Chapitre 7 and international acclaim ===
"Da Vinci Claude", the first single from Solaar's album Chapitre 7, was launched in March 2007. The album was released on 18 June 2007. MC Solaar is best known outside France for his work on Guru's Jazzmatazz project and as a featured artist on the Missy Elliott track "All N My Grill". His collaboration with her propelled him to higher popularity in the U.S market. The single "Le Bien, Le Mal" (The Good, The Bad) has been a hip-hop/dance crossover hit and has received playtime on MTV, which characterizes his work this way: "His fluid phrasing makes up for his lack of English, and the production on his solo work (by DJ Jimmy Jay and Boom Bass of La Funk Mob) surpasses that of most of his hip-hop contemporaries."

MC Solaar is one of the few French rappers having success in the English-dominated American hip-hop culture. American rapper will.i.am admitted he prefers MC Solaar to American rapper Tupac Shakur.

== Personal life ==
MC Solaar studied humanities in highly selective preparatory classes (hypokhâgne). On 7 December 2003, MC Solaar married Chloé Bensemoun and on 7 May 2004, she gave birth to the couple's first child, a son named Roman. In 2007, she gave birth to a daughter named Bonnie. They divorced in 2012.

== Philanthropy ==
MC Solaar has been a member of the Les Enfoirés charity ensemble since 1997.

== Discography ==
=== Albums ===
Studio albums

Year	Album	Peak positions					Sales	Certifications
Year	Album	FR	AUT	BEL (Wa)	GER	SWI	Sales	Certifications
1991	Qui sème le vent récolte le tempo	–	–	6	–	37		FRA: Platinum; SWI: Gold
1994	Prose Combat	–	28	6	81	12		FRA: 2× Gold
1997	Paradisiaque	1	–	6	96	8		FRA: Platinum
1998	MC Solaar	9	–	14	–	19		
2001	Cinquième As	2	–	2	98	5		FRA: 2× Platinum
2003	Mach 6	2	–	12	–	–		FRA: Platinum
2007	Chapitre 7	5	–	6	–	–	FRA: 150,000	FRA: Gold
2017	Géopoétique	1	–	3	–	14	FRA: 99,000	FRA: Platinum
2024	Triptyque: Lueurs célestes	7	–	11	–	–		
2024	Triptyque: Éclats cosmiques	33	–	33	–	–		

Live albums

Year	Album	Peak positions			Certification
Year	Album	FR	BEL (Wa)	SWI	Certification
1998	Le Tour De La Question	8	19	–	FRA: 2× Gold

Compilation albums

Year	Album	Peak positions			Certification
Year	Album	FR	BEL (Wa)	SWI	Certification
2010	Magnum 567	–	–	–	

=== Maxis and EPs ===
- Solaar Power EP
- Inch'Allah EP

=== Singles ===
Year	Single	Peak positions			Album
Year	Single	FR	BEL (Wa)	SWI	Album
1991	"Bouge de là"	22	–	–	Qui sème le vent récolte le tempo
1991	"Victime de la mode"	32	–	–	Qui sème le vent récolte le tempo
1992	"Caroline"	4	31	–	Qui sème le vent récolte le tempo
1992	"Qui sème le vent récolte le tempo"	39	–	–	Qui sème le vent récolte le tempo
1993	"Nouveau western"	4	–	–	Prose Combat
1994	"Séquelles"	19	–	–	Prose Combat
1994	"Obsolète"	29	–	–	Prose Combat
1995	"La concubine de l'hémoglobine"	42	–	–	Prose Combat
1997	"Gangster moderne"	31	25	–	Paradisiaque
1997	"Les temps changent"	13	26	–	Paradisiaque
1998	"Paradisiaque"	41	28	–	Paradisiaque
1998	"Galaktika"	64	–	–	Cinquième As
2001	"Solaar pleure"	4	2	22	Cinquième As
2001	"Hasta la vista"	1	5	23	Cinquième As
2001	"RMI"	22	3* (Ultratip)	–	Cinquième As
2002	"La la la, la"	39	2* (Ultratip)	–	Cinquième As
2002	"Inch'Allah"	1	16	13	Inch'Allah EP
2004	"Hijo de Africa"	32	–	–	Mach 6
2004	"Au pays de Gandhi"	37	–	–	Mach 6
2007	"Clic clic"	19	7* (Ultratip)	–	Chapitre 7
2008	"Le rabbi muffin"	20	1	–	
2017	"Sonotone"	3	46	–	Géopoétique
2018	"Eksassaute"	60	40	–	Géopoétique
2018	"Aiwa"	–	33	–	Géopoétique

*Did not appear in the official Belgian Ultratop 50 charts, but rather in the bubbling under Ultratip charts.

Collective singles

Year	Single	Peak positions	Album
Year	Single	FR	Album
2014	"À quoi ça sert l'amour" (live) (Lavoine / Zazie / Mathy / MC Solaar / Ségara / Les Enfoirés / Chœurs du Collège du Kochersberg)	105	Les Enfoirés album Bon anniversaire

Featured in

Year	Single	Peak positions								Album
Year	Single	FR	AUT	BEL (Vl)	BEL (Wa)	GER	NED	SWE	SWI	Album
1993	"Le bien, le mal" (Guru feat. MC Solaar)	33	–	–	–	–	–	–	–	
1995	"Listen" (Urban Species feat. MC Solaar)	29	–	–	–	–	–	–	–	
1999	"All n My Grill" (Missy Misdemeanor Elliott feat. MC Solaar)	16	–	7 (Ultratip)	9	22	86	39	23	

== Filmography ==
- 1991: Pour Kim Song-Man - short film by Costa-Gavras
- 2005: Mort à l'écran as Jonathan - short film by Alexis Ferrebeuf
- 2011: Illegal Love voice over - documentary by Julie Gali

== References and footnotes ==
Preceded by Alain Souchon	Victoires de la Musique; Male artist of the year 1995	Succeeded by Maxime Le Forestier
Preceded by Gibraltar by Abd al Malik	Victoires de la Musique; Urban music album of the year Chapitre 7; 2008	Succeeded by Dante by Abd al Malik
