= Tony Christie discography =

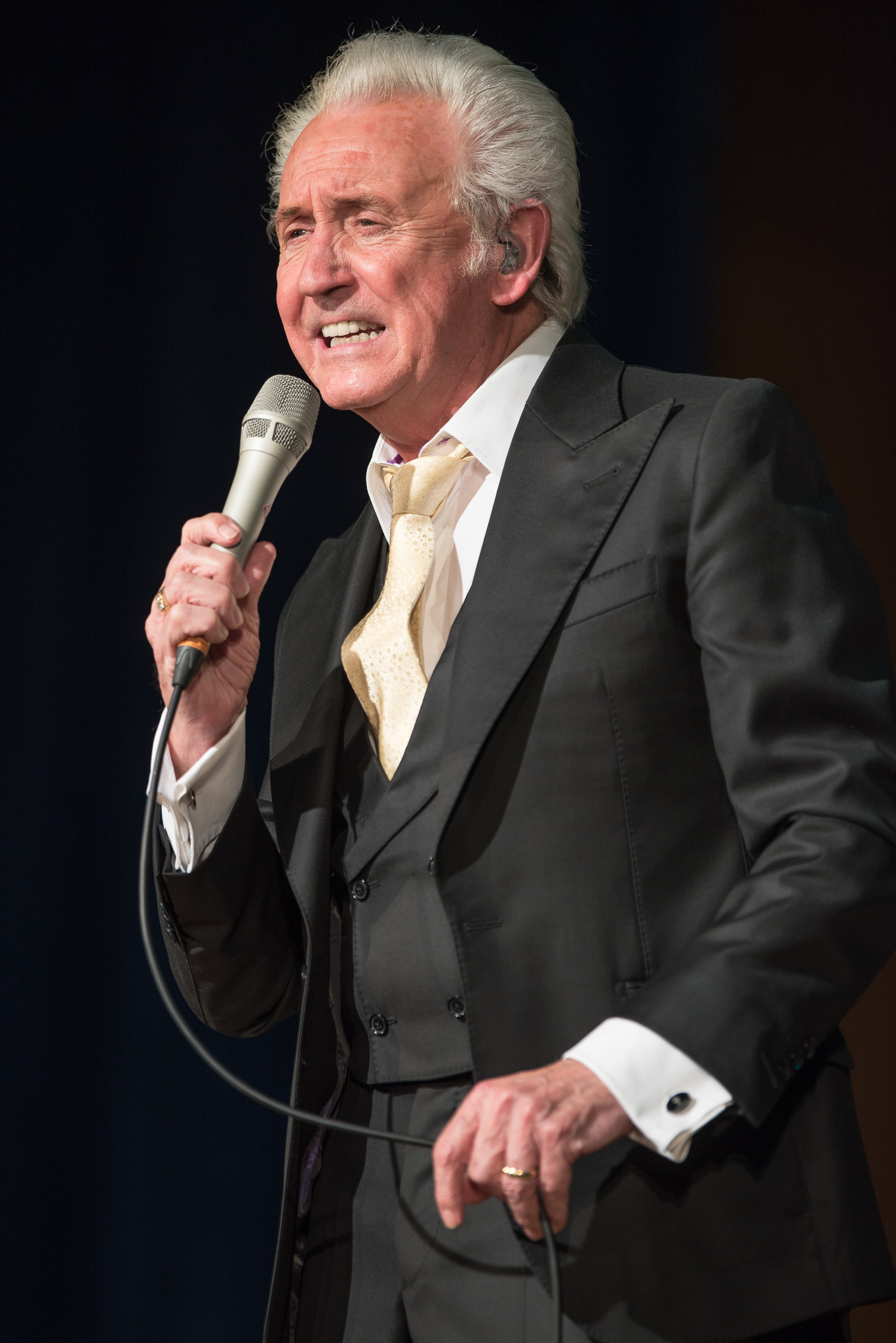
- Tony Christie performing in 2016
- Studio albums: 21
- Live albums: 3
- Compilation albums: 13
- Singles: 75

This is the discography of British singer-songwriter Tony Christie.

== Albums ==
=== Studio albums ===
Title	Album details	Peak chart positions					
Title	Album details	UK	AUS	AUT	FIN	GER	NL
Tony Christie	Released: June 1971; Label: MCA; Formats: LP	37	42	—	—	—	—
With Loving Feeling	Released: 1972; Label: MCA; Formats: LP, 8-track	19	—	—	30	—	—
It's Good to Be Me	Released: 1974; Label: MCA; Formats: LP, MC, 8-track	—	—	—	—	—	—
From America with Love	Released: November 1974; Label: MCA; Formats: LP, MC, 8-track	—	—	—	—	—	—
I'm Not in Love	Released: May 1975; Label: MCA; Formats: LP, MC, 8-track	—	—	—	—	—	—
Ladies' Man	Released: April 1980; Label: RCA Victor; Formats: LP	—	—	15	—	30	—
Time and Tears	Released: 1982; Label: RCA Victor; Formats: LP	—	—	—	—	—	—
As Long as I Have You	Released: 1983; Label: RCA; Formats: LP	—	—	—	—	—	—
Country Roads	Released: 1983; Label: RCA; Formats: LP	—	—	—	—	—	—
Welcome to My Music	Released: August 1991; Label: White; Formats: CD, LP, MC	—	—	26	—	7	44
Welcome to My Music 2	Released: October 1992; Label: White; Formats: CD, LP, MC	—	—	—	—	26	—
In Love Again	Released: September 1993; Label: White/BMG; Formats: CD	—	—	—	—	—	—
Calypso and Rum	Released: October 1994; Label: White/BMG; Formats: CD, MC	—	—	—	—	—	—
This Is Your Day	Released: September 1996; Label: Intercord; Formats: CD, MC	—	—	—	—	—	—
Time for Love	Released: 1998; Label: EMI; Formats: CD	—	—	—	—	—	—
Weihnachten mit Tony Christie (with the SWR Big Band)	Released: August 2001; Label: JTC Music/SR International; Formats: CD	—	—	—	—	—	—
Worldhits and Love-Songs	Released: 2 September 2002; Label: Da Music; Formats: CD	—	—	—	—	—	—
Simply in Love	Released: 6 November 2006; Label: Tug; Formats: CD	—	—	—	—	—	—
Made in Sheffield	Released: 10 November 2008; Label: Autonomy; Formats: CD	91	—	—	—	—	—
Now's the Time!	Released: 7 February 2011; Label: Acid Jazz; Formats: CD, LP	—	—	—	—	—	—
The Great Irish Songbook (with Ranagri)	Released: 18 September 2015; Label: Wrasse; Formats: CD, digital download	—	—	—	—	—	—
It's Getting Close to Christmas	Released: 28 October 2022; Label: Spectrum Music; Formats: CD, EP, Digital Download	—	—	—	—	—	—
We Still Shine	Released: 16 February 2024; Label: Universal Music Recordings; Formats: CD, LP, Digital Download	—	—	—	—	—	—
A New Life	Released: 28 March 2025; Label: Universal Music Recordings; Formats: CD, LP, Digital Download	—	—	—	—	—	—
"—" denotes releases that did not chart or were not released in that territory.

=== Live albums ===
Title	Album details	Peak chart positions
Title	Album details	UK
Recital at the Festival the "Golden Orpheus '72"	Released: 1972; Label: Balankton; Formats: LP; Bulgaria-only release	—
Live	Released: May 1975; Label: MCA; Formats: LP, MC	33
Tony Christie at the V Festival – Live!	Released: 21 November 2005; Label: Prism Leisure; Formats: DVD+CD	—
"—" denotes releases that did not chart or were not released in that territory.

=== Compilation albums ===
Title	Album details	Peak chart positions		
Title	Album details	UK	AUS	GER
Best of Tony Christie	Released: October 1976; Label: MCA; Formats: LP, MC, 8-track	28	—	—
So Deep Is the Night	Released: September 1978; Label: Music for Pleasure; Formats: LP, MC	—	—	—
Das Beste von Tony Christie	Released: October 1982; Label: MCA; Formats: LP	—	—	56
Greatest Hits	Released: 1982; Label: J&B; Formats: LP, MC	—	39	—
The Hit Single Collection	Released: 1985; Label: MCA; Formats: LP	—	—	—
Castle Music Collection	Released: 1990; Label: Castle Communications; Formats: CD, MC	—	—	—
The Greatest Hollywood Movie Songs	Released: October 1999; Label: Edel; Formats: CD	—	—	—
The Legend That Is...Tony Christie – All the Hits and More	Released: 10 July 2006; Label: Xtra; Formats: CD, 2xLP, MC	—	—	—
Definitive Collection	Released: 21 February 2005; Label: Universal Music TV; Formats: CD	1	—	—
The Essential Collection	Released: 23 June 2008; Label: The Red Box; Formats: 2xCD	—	—	—
Best Of – Die größten Hits aus 50 Jahren	Released: 12 October 2012; Label: TELAMO; Formats: CD	—	—	—
50 Golden Greats	Released: 16 September 2015; Label: Wrasse; Formats: 3xCD, digital download	—	—	—
Sweet September – Greatest Hits	Released: 26 August 2016; Label: TELAMO; Formats: CD	—	—	—
"—" denotes releases that did not chart or were not released in that territory.

== Singles ==
Title	Year	Peak chart positions										Album
Title	Year	UK	AUS	BE (FL)	BE (WA)	GER	NL	NZ	SA	SWI	US	Album
"Life's Too Good to Waste" (with the Trackers)	1966	—	—	—	—	—	—	—	—	—	—	Non-album singles
"Turn Around"	1967	—	—	—	—	—	—	—	—	—	—	Non-album singles
"I Don't Want to Hurt You Anymore"	1968	—	—	—	—	—	—	—	—	—	—	Non-album singles
"My Prayer"	1968	—	—	—	—	—	—	—	—	—	—	Non-album singles
"God Is on My Side"	1970	—	—	—	—	—	—	—	—	—	—	Tony Christie
"Las Vegas"	1970	21	—	2	4	—	—	—	18	—	—	Tony Christie
"So Deep Is the Night" (Belgium-only release)	1970	—	—	—	—	—	—	—	—	—	—	Non-album single
"I Did What I Did for Maria"	1971	2	3	10	17	4	21	1	2	3	—	Tony Christie
"Have You Ever Been to Georgia?" (US and Australasia-only release)	1971	—	—	—	—	—	—	—	—	—	—	Tony Christie
"(Is This the Way to) Amarillo"	1971	18	10	1	15	1	4	2	6	3	121	With Loving Feeling
"Don't Go Down to Reno"	1972	—	67	17	20	5	—	8	—	6	—	With Loving Feeling
"My Love Song"	1972	—	—	—	—	—	—	—	—	—	—	With Loving Feeling
"Avenues and Alleyways"	1972	37	—	—	48	34	—	4	—	—	—	With Loving Feeling
"What Becomes of My World" (Japan and New Zealand-only release)	1972	—	—	—	—	—	—	—	—	—	—	Non-album singles
"No vayas a Reno" (Spain-only release)	1973	—	—	—	—	—	—	—	—	—	—	Non-album singles
"Love and Rainy Weather"	1973	—	—	—	—	—	—	—	—	—	—	It's Good to Be Me
"You Just Don't Have the Magic Anymore"	1973	—	60	—	—	—	—	—	—	—	—	Non-album single
"A Lover's Question"	1974	—	—	—	—	—	—	11	—	—	—	From America with Love
"Here Comes My Baby Back Again" (North America and Australasia-only release)	1974	—	—	—	—	—	—	—	—	—	—	From America with Love
"If You Stay Too Long in Oklahoma" (Germany-only release)	1974	—	—	—	—	—	—	—	—	—	—	It's Good to Be Me
"Happy Birthday Baby"	1974	58	14	—	—	—	—	—	—	—	—	From America with Love
"If I Miss You Again Tonight"	1975	—	—	—	—	—	—	—	—	—	—	Non-album single
"Words (Are Impossible)" (North America and Australasia-only release)	1975	—	—	—	—	—	—	29	—	—	—	From America with Love
"Easy to Love"	1975	—	—	—	—	—	—	—	—	—	—	N/A
"Drive Safely Darlin'"	1975	35	93	—	—	—	—	17	18	—	—	I'm Not in Love
"Queen of the Mardi Gras"	1976	—	95	—	—	—	—	—	—	—	—	I'm Not in Love
"On This Night of a Thousand Stars"	1977	—	—	—	—	—	—	—	—	—	—	Evita
"Smile a Little Smile for Me"	1977	—	—	—	—	—	—	—	—	—	—	Non-album singles
"Stolen Love"	1977	—	—	—	—	—	—	—	—	—	—	Non-album singles
"Magdalena" (featuring Dana Gillespie)	1977	—	—	—	—	—	—	—	—	—	—	Non-album singles
"Sweet September" (Europe-only release)	1979	—	—	—	—	16	—	—	—	7	—	Ladies' Man
"Train to Yesterday" (Germany-only release)	1980	—	—	—	—	52	—	—	—	—	—	Ladies' Man
"Mexico City" (Netherlands and Germany-only release)	1980	—	—	—	—	—	—	—	—	—	—	Ladies' Man
"Summer Wine" (Germany-only release)	1981	—	—	—	—	—	—	—	—	—	—	Time and Tears
"Put a Light in Your Window" (Germany-only release)	1981	—	—	—	—	—	—	—	—	—	—	Time and Tears
"Me and Marie" (Germany-only release)	1982	—	—	—	—	—	—	—	—	—	—	Time and Tears
"Long Gone" (Germany-only release)	1982	—	—	—	—	—	—	—	—	—	—	Time and Tears
"Te voglio mi' amor' (I Want You My Love)" (Germany-only release)	1983	—	—	—	—	—	—	—	—	—	—	As Long as I Have You
"The Wind Beneath My Wings"	1985	—	—	—	—	—	—	—	—	—	—	Non-album singles
"Battle of Wounded Pride" (Germany-only release)	1987	—	—	—	—	—	—	—	—	—	—	Non-album singles
"Keep On Dancin'" (Germany-only release)	1988	—	—	—	—	—	—	—	—	—	—	Non-album singles
"Kiss in the Night" (Germany-only release)	1990	—	—	—	—	42	—	—	—	—	—	Welcome to My Music
"September Love" (Europe-only release)	1990	—	—	—	—	—	—	—	—	—	—	Welcome to My Music
"Moonlight and Roses" (Europe-only release)	1991	—	—	—	—	91	—	—	—	—	—	Welcome to My Music
"Come with Me to Paradise" (Europe-only release)	1991	—	—	—	—	37	—	—	—	—	—	Welcome to My Music
"Sweet September" (re-recording; Europe-only release)	1991	—	—	—	—	—	—	—	—	—	—	Welcome to My Music
"Is This the Way to Amarillo" (re-recording; Netherlands-only release)	1991	—	—	—	—	—	49	—	—	—	—	Welcome to My Music
"Going to Havana" (Europe-only release)	1991	—	—	—	—	—	—	—	—	—	—	Welcome to My Music
"You Are My Darling" (Europe-only release)	1992	—	—	—	—	—	—	—	—	—	—	Welcome to My Music 2
"Arrivederci" (Germany-only release)	1992	—	—	—	—	—	—	—	—	—	—	Welcome to My Music 2
"Down in Mexico" (Europe-only release)	1992	—	—	—	—	—	—	—	—	—	—	Welcome to My Music 2
"Dancing in the Sunshine" (Germany-only release)	1993	—	—	—	—	—	—	—	—	—	—	In Love Again
"Come Back Diana" (Europe-only release)	1993	—	—	—	—	—	—	—	—	—	—	In Love Again
"Solitaire" (Germany-only release)	1993	—	—	—	—	—	—	—	—	—	—	In Love Again
"Got to Be Mine" (Europe-only release)	1994	—	—	—	—	—	—	—	—	—	—	In Love Again
"Calypso and Rum" (Germany-only release)	1994	—	—	—	—	96	—	—	—	—	—	Calypso and Rum
"We're Gonna Stay Together" (with Vicky Leandros; Europe-only release)	1995	—	—	—	—	—	—	—	—	—	—	Lieben und Leben (by Leandros)
"Dreaming of Natalie" (Germany-only release)	1995	—	—	—	—	—	—	—	—	—	—	Calypso and Rum
"Moon Over Napoli" (Germany-only release)	1995	—	—	—	—	—	—	—	—	—	—	Calypso and Rum
"Oh mi amor" (Germany-only release)	1996	—	—	—	—	—	—	—	—	—	—	This Is Your Day
"Hit Mix" (Germany-only release)	1997	—	—	—	—	—	—	—	—	—	—	Non-album single
"Never Say Auf Wiedersehn" (Germany-only release)	1998	—	—	—	—	—	—	—	—	—	—	Time for Love
"Walk Like a Panther" (All Seeing I featuring Tony Christie)	1999	10	—	—	—	—	—	—	—	—	—	Pickled Eggs & Sherbet (by All Seeing I)
"Baby Come Back" (Germany-only release)	2002	—	—	—	—	—	—	—	—	—	—	Worldhits and Love-Songs
"(Is This the Way to) Amarillo" (featuring Peter Kay)	2005	1	—	—	—	—	—	—	—	—	—	Non-album singles
"(Is This the Way to) Amarillo" (with Hermes House Band; Europe-only release)	2005	—	—	—	—	25	—	—	—	—	—	Non-album singles
"Avenues & Alleyways" (re-release)	2005	26	—	—	—	—	—	—	—	—	—	Definitive Collection
"Merry Xmas Everybody"	2005	49	—	—	—	—	—	—	—	—	—	Non-album singles
"(Is This the Way to) The World Cup"	2006	8	—	—	—	—	—	—	—	—	—	Non-album singles
"Born to Cry" (promo-only release)	2008	—	—	—	—	—	—	—	—	—	—	Made in Sheffield
"If I Had a Hammer"	2009	—	—	—	—	—	—	—	—	—	—	Non-album single
"Nobody in the World"	2010	—	—	—	—	—	—	—	—	—	—	Now's the Time!
"Now's the Time!"	2011	—	—	—	—	—	—	—	—	—	—	Now's the Time!
"Steal the Sun"	2011	—	—	—	—	—	—	—	—	—	—	Now's the Time!
"Star of the County Down" (with Ranagri)	2015	—	—	—	—	—	—	—	—	—	—	The Great Irish Songbook
"Thank You for Being a Friend" (with Sting and Nile Rodgers)	2023	—	—	—	—	—	—	—	—	—	—	Non-album single
"Whiskey in the Jar" (with Ranagri)	2025	—	—	—	—	—	—	—	—	—	—	The Great Irish Songbook Vol II
"—" denotes releases that did not chart or were not released in that territory.
