= Definitive Collection (Tony Christie album) =

Greatest hits album by Tony Christie
- Released: 2005
- Genre: Jazz, Pop
- Label: Universal Music TV

Tony Christie chronology
Definitive Collection (2005)	Simply in Love (2006)

Definitive Collection is a greatest hits album by Tony Christie. It was released by Universal Music TV in 2005 and peaked at number one on the UK Albums Chart.

The album had two singles, "(Is This the Way to) Amarillo" and "Avenues and Alleyways", reached Number 1 and number 26 respectively in the UK singles chart in 2005.

== Track listing ==
1. (Is This the Way to) Amarillo
2. Avenues and Alleyways
3. Las Vegas
4. Solitaire
5. Happy Birthday Baby
6. I Did What I Did for Maria
7. Drive Safely Darlin'
8. On This Night of a Thousand Stars
9. Daddy Don't You Walk So Fast
10. Most Beautiful Girl
11. Don't Go Down to Reno
12. The Way We Were
13. So Deep Is the Night
14. Didn't We
15. You've Lost That Lovin' Feelin'
16. Home Lovin' Man
17. Walk like a Panther (All Seeing I feat. Tony Christie)
18. Vienna Sunday
19. Loving You
20. Almost in Love
21. A Street of Broken Dreams

== Charts ==
=== Weekly charts ===
Chart (2005)	Peak position
Irish Albums (IRMA)	6
Scottish Albums (OCC)	1
UK Albums (OCC)	1

=== Year-end charts ===
Chart (2005)	Position
UK Albums (OCC)	28
