= The Black-Eyed Boys =

Single by Paper Lace

from the album Paper Lace (US)
- B-side: "Jean"
- Released: July 1974
- Recorded: 1974
- Genre: Hard rock, blues rock, glam rock, power pop
- Length: 3:58
- Label: Philips (UK), Mercury Records (US)
- Songwriter(s): Mitch Murray, Peter Callander
- Producer(s): Mitch Murray, Peter Callander (uncredited)

Paper Lace singles chronology
"The Night Chicago Died" (1974)	"The Black-Eyed Boys" (1974)	"Hitchin' a Ride '75" (1974)

"The Black Eyed Boys" is a song by the British pop group Paper Lace. This song missed the top 40 in the United States, but it fared better in Canada reaching number 37 and also in the United Kingdom, reaching number 11. It was the band's third single to be released in the UK.

== Chart performance ==
=== Weekly singles charts ===
Chart (1974/75)	Peak position
Australia (Kent Music Report)	23
Canada	37
U.S. Billboard Hot 100	41
UK	11
