= The Protectors =

British action TV series (1972–1974)

- Genre: Action; Adventure; Crime drama; Thriller
- Starring: Robert Vaughn; Nyree Dawn Porter; Tony Anholt; Anthony Chinn; Yasuko Nagazumi
- Theme music composer: Mitch Murray; Lyrics: Peter Callander
- Opening theme: "Avenues and Alleyways", instrumental version
- Ending theme: "Avenues and Alleyways", sung by Tony Christie
- Composer: John Cameron
- Country of origin: United Kingdom
- Original language: English
- No. of series: 2
- No. of episodes: 52

Production
- Producers: Gerry Anderson; Reg Hill
- Cinematography: Brendan J. Stafford; Frank Watts
- Editors: Mike Campbell; David Lane; Bert Rule; John S. Smith; Geoffrey Mackrill
- Running time: 25 minutes
- Production company: Group Three Productions for ATV

Original release
- Network: ITV
- Release: 29 September 1972 – 15 March 1974

The Protectors is a British action thriller television series produced by Gerry Anderson. It starred Robert Vaughn as Harry Rule, Nyree Dawn Porter as the Contessa Caroline di Contini, and Tony Anholt as Paul Buchet. It was Anderson's second television series to exclusively use live actors as opposed to marionettes following UFO, and his second to be firmly set in contemporary times post The Secret Service. It was also the only Gerry Anderson–produced television series that was not of the fantasy or science fiction genres. It was produced by Lew Grade's ITC Entertainment production company. Despite not featuring marionettes or any real science fiction elements, The Protectors became one of Anderson's most popular productions, gaining a renewal for a second series. A third series was in the planning stages when the show's major sponsor, Brut Productions, ended its funding, which forced the series' cancellation.

The Protectors was first broadcast in 1972 and 1973, and ran to 52 episodes over two series, each 25 minutes long—making it one of the last series of this type to be produced in a half-hour format.

== Premise ==
Three inexplicably affluent international private detectives/troubleshooters are charged with ensuring the protection of innocents. They belong to an organisation called The Protectors, based in London. Harry Rule leads the group. The Contessa lives in Italy, when she is not working with Harry. She runs her own detective agency, which specialises in exposing art frauds and recovering stolen art. Paul Buchet works out of Paris, and is the group's researcher and gadget specialist. Adventures range from simple kidnapping to convoluted cases of international intrigue. These characters are all very wealthy and drive exotic cars of the era, such as the Citroën SM and Jensen Interceptor.

The show was parodied in two episodes of the 1996 BBC Radio 4 comedy series Fab TV: "The Preventers" and "The Return of the Preventers".

== Production ==
According to co-producer Gerry Anderson, the show's format was outlined in a brief four-paragraph memo that Lew Grade gave him, and he was then given a free hand to develop it, although Grade ultimately cast two of the main actors himself. The format of the series allowed for occasional episodes in which not all of the main actors appeared, including two in which Vaughn's character was absent.

Like The Persuaders!, a similar series also produced by ITC that aired around the same time, The Protectors was shot on location at numerous locations throughout Europe, such as Salzburg, Rome, Malta and Paris. In order to offset the cost of location filming, and also perhaps because the equipment was more portable, the series was shot on 16mm film rather than the usual 35mm.

The episodes aimed at fast-paced action set against an international background, incorporating elements from both private-eye detective shows and espionage shows, but within a half-hour format. The lack of screen time, compared with the 50-minute timeslot used by shows like The Persuaders! or Department S, resulted in plots that were rather simplistic, with motivation and characterisation sacrificed for action, owing to the writers having to cram as much as possible into a 25-minute timeslot and still produce gripping television, although one adventure, set on a cable-car station in the Alps was shown as a 2-part story. Accordingly, the series suffered from most of the same drawbacks that beset The Adventurer, another half-hour ITC show that aired at the same time.

The theme tune of the series, "Avenues and Alleyways" was performed by singer Tony Christie.

This was the first Anderson series not to feature music composed by Barry Gray.

Courtfield Mews, London SW5 was used as the filming location for The Protectors headquarters.

In Germany the series was known as Kein Pardon für Schutzengel (meaning "No Mercy for Guardian Angels") and in France as Poigne de fer et séduction ("Iron Fist and Seduction"). This highlights another snag which bedevilled the show: its English title, The Protectors, could imply that Robert Vaughn was playing a bodyguard, in a more serious version of the 1980s ITV show Minder.

In South Africa, the series was dubbed into Afrikaans as Die Beskermers (the literal translation of The Protectors) and was broadcast on the South African Broadcasting Corporation.

As was the case for most of Anderson's series, in the United States the series was not broadcast on network television, but aired instead in first-run syndication. This made it more difficult for the show to make any impact in America, despite its popular American star, and this hurt its overseas sales.

=== Actor relationships ===
According to Robert Vaughn's autobiography, there were many problems between the actor and both the show's financier, Lew Grade, and its co-producer, Gerry Anderson. John Hough (who directed several episodes, and the opening title sequence of the series) had many more problems with Vaughn's business partner, Sherwood Price, than with Vaughn himself.

Vaughn said that he felt the series was "tasteless junk", and that he could not understand the scripts either before or during shooting. In a 1972 interview with The New York Times, he criticised the writing and casting, and said that The Protectors had failed to live up to his expectations, describing the production as "much below the American standard". He added that the series "may have the redeeming feature of any escapist entertainment, that you can sit down for 22 minutes and watch people in pretty clothes run around shooting guns and so get your mind off your personal problems. If that's redemptive, it has that quality."

Vaughn was given the opportunity to direct one episode himself—number 23 in production order, "It Could Be Practically Anywhere on the Island". On this production he met actress Linda Staab; they married three years later, and remained married until his death 42 years later in 2016. Although Vaughn had a better relationship with Grade, the mogul called "It Could Be Practically Anywhere on the Island" the worst episode he had ever seen of anything.

== Episodes ==
=== Series 1 (1972–73) ===
No. in series	Title	Directed by	Written by	Original release date	Prod. code
1	"2000 ft to Die"	John Hough	Terence Feely	29 September 1972	1
Scientist Freddie Reiwald contacts the Protectors when his colleagues at the Cranston Research Centre die in suspicious circumstances. In Italy, Harry and Caroline discover that an unknown party has completed Reiwald's research into the production of synthetic gold—and now Reiwald's daughter's life is in danger.
2	"Brother Hood"	Don Chaffey	John Goldsmith	6 October 1972	2
The Protectors are hired to break a billionaire's brother out of prison, similar to the Kaplan prison escape in Mexico in 1971. Guest-starring Patrick Troughton, Vladek Sheybal, Robert Brown and Leon Lissek.
3	"See No Evil"	Jeremy Summers	Donald Johnson	13 October 1972	10
The Protectors, attempting to guard an Italian senator in Rome, find a blackmailer who has got out of control. Guest-starring James Bolam, Leonard Sachs and Tony Haygarth.
4	"Disappearing Trick"	Jeremy Summers	Brian Clemens	20 October 1972	3
The Contessa risks her life when a deceptive new client uses her to escape the police. Guest-starring Derren Nesbitt, David Bauer, Don Henderson and David Calderisi.
5	"Ceremony for the Dead"	Jeremy Summers	Donald James	27 October 1972	26
The Protectors are hired to stop the kidnapping of a president.
6	"It Was All Over in Leipzig"	Don Chaffey	Donald James	3 November 1972	25
Whilst investigating a plot to overthrow the government of a Mediterranean nation, the Protectors end up confronting two old friends of the Contessa, one of whom she was once romantically involved with. Guest-starring Ron Randell.
7	"The Quick Brown Fox"	Don Chaffey	Donald James	10 November 1972	5
The Protectors are hired to help find a missing band of Nazis. Guest-starring Morris Perry and Christopher Benjamin.
8	"King Con"	Jeremy Summers	Tony Barwick	17 November 1972	12
The Protectors find themselves in the middle of a war over some antiques. Guest-starring Anton Rodgers, Ronald Lacey and Peter Cellier.
9	"Thinkback"	Cyril Frankel	Brian Clemens	24 November 1972	14
Harry is the victim of a car crash. But was it an accident?
10	"A Kind of Wild Justice"	Jeremy Summers	Donald James	1 December 1972	8
The daughter of a gangster returns after his death to kill Harry. Or does she?
11	"Balance of Terror"	Don Chaffey	John Goldsmith	8 December 1972	11
A scientist disappears with a deadly biological weapon. The first the Protectors know of this is when the KGB breaks into Harry's flat to tell them. Guest-starring Nigel Green, Laurence Naismith and Milos Kirek.
12	"Triple Cross"	John Hough	Lew Davidson	15 December 1972	7
A charming charlatan cons Caroline's friend. Guest-starring John Neville, Peter Bowles, John Barrard and Del Henney.
13	"The Numbers Game"	Don Chaffey	Ralph Smart	29 December 1972	6
The Protectors investigate a runaway and discover she is involved with an international drug smuggling operation.
14	"For the Rest of Your Natural…"	John Hough	Tony Barwick	5 January 1973	18
Caroline is abducted by an old enemy who sends her for a bizarre trial.
15	"The Bodyguards"	Don Chaffey	Dennis Spooner	12 January 1973	19
The Protectors are assigned to guard the body of a deceased robber and follow his old associates to find stolen money.
16	"A Matter of Life and Death"	Don Chaffey	Donald James	19 January 1973	22
Harry and the Contessa uncover an international smuggling operation run by Mallory. They find themselves in danger when he discovers who they are.
17	"The Big Hit"	Roy Ward Baker	Donald James	26 January 1973	13
Members of the Protectors are being killed by someone who has targeted the organisation. Harry is abducted, and threatened with death if he does not reveal information.
18	"One and One Makes One"	Don Chaffey	Jesse & Pat Lasky	2 February 1973	9
A spy goes missing with crucial information. The Protectors are tasked with finding him—but is he still alive? Guest-starring Michael Gough, Georgia Brown, Neil McCallum and Christopher Dunham.
19	"Talkdown"	Jeremy Summers	Jesse & Pat Lasky	9 February 1973	20
Harry is abducted by a man who blames him for his brother's death. He parachutes out of a plane, leaving Harry stranded unless he can be talked down.
20	"Vocal"	Cyril Frankel	Brian Clemens	16 February 1973	24
After Paul is temporarily blinded, gangsters hire a man to impersonate Harry and get information about the Protectors from him.
21	"…With a Little Help from My Friends"	Jeremy Summers	Sylvia Anderson	23 February 1973	17
Harry is blackmailed into carrying out the assassination of a Middle Eastern leader he has been hired to protect. Guest-starring Jeremy Brett, Hannah Gordon, Martin Benson, Saeed Jaffrey and Roshan Seth.
22	"Chase"	Harry Booth	Brian Clemens	2 March 1973	16
Harry must protect a South American diplomat from rivals who are trying to kill him.
23	"Your Witness"	Jeremy Summers	Donald James	9 March 1973	4
A club owner hires the Protectors to guard his niece, who is a witness in a murder trial.
24	"It Could Be Practically Anywhere on the Island"	Robert Vaughn	Tony Barwick	16 March 1973	23
In Malta, Harry gets involved with an Arkansas millionairess, her pet dog, and a piece of microfilm. (Other than the Police Woman episode "The Melting Point Of Ice", this is Robert Vaughn's only directorial credit; it is also the only episode of any Gerry Anderson series directed by a member of the cast.)
25	"The First Circle"	Don Chaffey	Tony Barwick	23 March 1973	15
Vietnam War veteran John Hunter (Ed Bishop), deranged by his experiences, goes berserk. The man's wife asks the Protectors to help before the authorities kill him.
26	"A Case for the Right"	Michael Lindsay-Hogg	Jesse & Pat Lasky	30 March 1973	21
Harry and the Contessa are hired to deliver a package. When they discover they have been used as decoys, they investigate further and end up trying to stop a coup plot.

=== Series 2 (1973–74) ===
No. in series	Title	Directed by	Written by	Original release date	Prod. code
1	"Quin"	Don Leaver	Trevor Preston	21 September 1973	4
The Protectors are hired by the sister of a man who disappeared after being hired as a mercenary. They discover he was murdered on the orders of Quin, the leader of the organisation that hired him.
2	"Bagman"	John Hough	Terry Nation	28 September 1973	1
A wealthy widow's daughter is kidnapped and Harry is required to drop off the ransom money.
3	"Fighting Fund"	Jeremy Summers	John Kruse	5 October 1973	3
The Protectors must thwart a terrorist gang who plan to use a stolen art collection to buy arms for their cause.
4	"The Last Frontier"	Charles Crichton	Jean Morris	12 October 1973	8
The Protectors are hired by a British politician to smuggle his sweetheart, a Russian nuclear scientist, into Britain so that they can marry.
5	"Baubles, Bangles and Beads"	Jeremy Summers	Terry Nation	19 October 1973	9
When a jewellery collection is stolen and a ransom demanded from the insurance company, they hire Harry and the Contessa to act as intermediaries with the robbers.
6	"Petard"	Cyril Frankel	Tony Barwick	26 October 1973	10
The head of a chemical company hires the Protectors to discover who stole company secrets and sold them to a rival.
7	"Goodbye George"	Michael Lindsay-Hogg	Brian Clemens	2 November 1973	6
Caroline is hired by an American millionaire who thinks his son, an artist living in Venice, has fallen victim to a con-man. (This and "The Tiger And The Goat" are the only episodes in which Robert Vaughn does not appear.)
8	"WAM (Part One)"	Jeremy Summers	Tony Barwick	9 November 1973	13
The daughter of a wealthy man is involved in a hostage situation at a ski resort, with skiers held for ransom. Guest starring Prentis Hancock and John Herrington.
9	"WAM (Part Two)"	Jeremy Summers	Tony Barwick	16 November 1973	14
The ransom is paid and the hostages released, but the Protectors and the police must work out how the woman was involved.
10	"Implicado"	Jeremy Summers	Tony Barwick	23 November 1973	7
A woman hires the Protectors when her son, who has become involved with a drug dealer in Spain, is framed and arrested by police.
11	"Dragon Chase"	Charles Crichton	John Kruse	30 November 1973	15
The Protectors must prevent a group of communist sympathisers from obtaining the manuscript of a book written by a Soviet defector.
12	"Decoy"	Michael Lindsay-Hogg	Brian Clemens	7 December 1973	17
The Protectors investigate an insurance fraud involving an old friend of Harry's who, having previously staged his own death, is killed for real.
13	"Border Line"	Charles Crichton	Anthony Terpiloff	14 December 1973	12
An actress who is the daughter of a Hungarian exile hires the Protectors to help arrange a secret funeral for her father so that he can be buried on home soil.
14	"Zeke's Blues"	Jeremy Summers	Shane Rimmer	21 December 1973	16
A jazz musician has become involved with gangsters and has to set up Harry to pay off a debt.
15	"Lena"	Don Leaver	Trevor Preston	28 December 1973	5
The Protectors must protect a journalist investigating a politician who is linked to a murder.
16	"The Bridge"	Jeremy Summers	Tony Barwick	4 January 1974	2
The Protectors must foil a radical group's plot to assassinate a politician by blowing up a bridge as his car crosses it.
17	"Sugar and Spice"	Charles Crichton	David Butler	11 January 1974	20
A millionaire's young daughter is targeted by rivals who want to block a company take-over. He hires the Protectors to shelter her, which they must do so without raising her suspicions.
18	"Burning Bush"	Don Leaver	Trevor Preston	18 January 1974	11
A wealthy man is concerned to discover his teenage daughter is involved with an obscure religious sect. Harry goes undercover to find out what goes on inside the community. (Note: Nyree Dawn Porter does not appear in this episode).
19	"The Tiger and the Goat"	Jeremy Summers	Trevor Preston	25 January 1974	23
British Intelligence use the Contessa as bait to capture an assassin who has targeted their agents, however there is a twist when the supposed assassin reveals himself.
20	"Route 27"	Don Leaver	Terry Nation	1 February 1974	26
Harry investigates a drug-smuggling operation based in Denmark and becomes a target when the gang discover his involvement.
21	"Trial"	Charles Crichton	Robert Banks Stewart	8 February 1974	25
The Protectors must prevent the murder of a judge who has been targeted by the father of the accused in a murder trial.
22	"Shadbolt"	John Hough	Tony Barwick	15 February 1974	19
Harry comes face to face with Shadbolt, a professional assassin who has been hired to kill him.
23	"A Pocketful of Posies"	Cyril Frankel	Terry Nation	22 February 1974	18
Famous singer Carrie Blaine (Eartha Kitt) fears she's losing her mind when peculiar things start happening around her, the Protectors must investigate.
24	"Wheels"	David Tomblin	Tony Barwick	1 March 1974	22
The Protectors must retrieve information about Swiss bank accounts stolen by a notorious thief.
25	"The Insider"	Don Leaver	Trevor Preston	8 March 1974	24
A film director hires the Protectors to investigate when copies of his latest film are stolen and a ransom is demanded.
26	"Blockbuster"	Jeremy Summers	Shane Rimmer	15 March 1974	21
The Protectors are hired to investigate an international series of platinum robberies carried out by a gang.

== Home media ==
ITV Studios Home Entertainment released the entire series on DVD in Region 2 in 2002/2003.

Network released a seven-disc Region 2 DVD set in 2010, comprising both series.

In Region 1, A&E Home Entertainment, under licence from Carlton International Media Limited, released the entire 52 episodes on Region 1 DVD for the first time ever, in two complete season sets, in 2003/2004.

On 10 September 2014, it was announced that VEI Entertainment had acquired the rights to the series in Region 1, and would re-release all 52 episodes on DVD on 4 November 2014.

== Music ==
In 2009, Network released a five-disc set of music recorded for the series, featuring Tony Christie's "Avenues and Alleyways", library music and scores for 13 episodes composed by John Cameron, and Eartha Kitt's rendition of "My Man's Gone Now" for the episode "A Pocketful of Posies".
