= Cliff Fish =

British bassist (1949–2023)

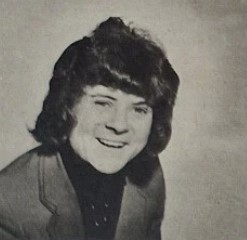

Background information
- Born: 13 August 1949; Ripley, England
- Died: 14 April 2023 (aged 73) Cyprus
- Instrument: Bass guitar
- Years active: 1967–2023
- Formerly of: Paper Lace

Clifford Victor Fish (13 August 1949 – 14 April 2023) was a British bass player. He was in Paper Lace from 1967 until his death in 2023.

== Career ==
Fish formed Music Box in 1967 with Phil Wright, the band that later became Paper Lace. They auditioned for Opportunity Knocks in 1970 but did not appear on the show until 1973, winning five episodes in a row. The following year, they topped the UK charts with "Billy—Don't Be a Hero" and had a second hit single "The Night Chicago Died". Paper Lace disbanded in 1980. Fish and Wright reformed the band in 2015, and Fish remained in the band until his death.

In 2013, Fish and the band played at the 100th birthday party of his mother-in-law, Pat Bell at the Derby Conference Centre.

== Death ==
Fish died at his home in Cyprus on 14 April 2023, aged 73, after battling cancer for two years. He was married to Elaine and had two sons, Rob and John.
