= Geoff Stephens =

English songwriter and record producer (1934–2020)

- Born: Geoffrey Stephens; 1 October 1934; New Southgate, North London, England
- Died: 24 December 2020 (aged 86) Bedfordshire, England
- Genres: Pop music
- Occupations: Songwriter, record producer
- Years active: 1960s-2020

Geoffrey Stephens (1 October 1934 – 24 December 2020) was an English songwriter and record producer, most prolific in the United Kingdom in the 1960s and 1970s. He wrote a long series of hit records, often in conjunction with other British songwriters including Tony Macaulay, John Carter, Roger Greenaway, Peter Callander, Barry Mason, Ken Howard, Alan Blaikley, Don Black, Mitch Murray, and Les Reed.

He also formed The New Vaudeville Band, and their song "Winchester Cathedral" won Stephens the 1967 Grammy Award for Best Contemporary (R&R) Recording.

== Early life ==
Stephens was born in New Southgate, North London, in 1934. At the end of the Second World War, the family moved to Westcliff-on-Sea in Essex to open a guesthouse. There on its easterly location Stephens was able to listen to jazz and American pop on the American Forces Network broadcast from Germany and Radio Luxembourg, which together with listening to classical music at home, instilled a love of music in him. However, growing up he had no formal music training and therefore he could not read musical notations; later when starting on his songwriting career, he employed other people to transcribe the music that he sang to them. He was inspired to become a writer by a high school teacher. After serving in the Middle East for two years in the national service, he moved to London, setting himself a goal of becoming a songwriter within three years.

== Career ==
Stephens began his career in amateur theatricals, when he wrote songs and sketches for musical revues presented by his own company, the Four Arts Society, while working as a school teacher, air traffic controller and silk screen printer. This led to BBC Radio accepting some of his satirical sketches for their Monday Night at Home programme.

In 1961, after receiving numerous rejections for the songs he wrote, he had his first song accepted by the music publisher Mills Music. The song, "Problem Girl", was taken up by Mike Leander and recorded by The Chariots. Stephens worked briefly for the music publisher, subsequently in 1964 he had his first hit "Tell Me When", co-written with Les Reed, a Top 10 hit for The Applejacks. Stephens had another successful song in 1964, "The Crying Game", which was a Top 5 hit for Dave Berry. The song later became the title song of the film of the same name and a hit for Boy George.

In late 1964, he and Peter Eden came across Donovan in Southend, Essex, and offered to manage him. They produced Donovan's first hit single and debut album, What's Bin Did and What's Bin Hid. In 1966 he formed The New Vaudeville Band, writing and recording songs in a 1920s musical style. Their debut single "Winchester Cathedral" was a No. 1 hit in the List of Billboard number-one singles and No. 4 in the UK Singles Chart, and covered by others including Dizzy Gillespie, Frank Sinatra, and The Firehouse Five Plus Two. It was followed by further hits for the band, "Peek A Boo", "Finchley Central" and "Green Street Green".

With John Carter, Stephens wrote "Semi-Detached Suburban Mr. James" for Manfred Mann and, with Les Reed, "There's a Kind of Hush" for The New Vaudeville Band. A year later, a cover version of "There's a Kind of Hush" was a hit for Herman's Hermits and also later a hit for The Carpenters, who also named an album a A Kind of Hush. Over the next few years he wrote, or co-wrote, hits for The Hollies ("Sorry Suzanne"), Ken Dodd ("Tears Won't Wash Away These Heartaches"), Cliff Richard ("Goodbye Sam, Hello Samantha"), Tom Jones ("Daughter of Darkness"), Mary Hopkin ("Knock, Knock Who's There?" - the 1970 UK entry in the Eurovision Song Contest), Scott Walker ("Lights of Cincinnati"), and Dana ("It's Gonna Be a Cold Cold Christmas").

In 1972, his joint composition with Peter Callander of "Daddy Don't You Walk So Fast", was recorded by Wayne Newton. It sold over one million copies, and was awarded a gold disc by the R.I.A.A. in July 1972. It was also recorded by Tony Christie. Other hits that followed included "You Won't Find Another Fool Like Me" by The New Seekers, which won the Ivor Novello Award in 1974, The Drifters' "Like Sister And Brother", Hot Chocolate's "I'll Put You Together Again", Sue and Sunny and Carol Douglas's "Doctor's Orders", Crystal Gayle's "It's Like We Never Said Goodbye", and, most successfully of all, the UK 1977 number one hit for David Soul, "Silver Lady".

In 1983, Stephens and Don Black composed the songs for the West End musical Dear Anyone, followed a year later by The Magic Castle with Les Reed. He has also been awarded the Gold Badge of Merit by the British Academy of Songwriters, Composers and Authors in 1995, and the Jimmy Kennedy Ivor Novello Award for Services to British Songwriting in 2000. This was followed by the 'revuesical' album Off the Wall.

More recently he wrote "To All My Loved Ones", featured as a centrepiece of the Festival of Remembrance at the Royal Albert Hall.

In 2005, Stephens worked with Peter Callander and David Cosgrove on the musical production of Bonnie & Clyde. Stephens also worked with Don Black on a planned stage revival of Dear Anyone.

== Personal life ==
Stephens was married to Pam, and they had three children, son Paul, and daughters Jenny and Ruth.

He died on 24 December 2020, at the age of 86, from pneumonia and COVID-19.
