= (Is This the Way to) The World Cup =

Single by Tony Christie
- Released: 29 May 2006
- Label: Tug Records
- Lyricist(s): Ian Stringer and George Webley

"(Is This the Way to) The World Cup" is a 2006 single by Tony Christie with lyrics written by Ian Stringer and George Webley and published by Tug Records. It was released as a version of Christie's successful "Is This the Way to Amarillo" single and created as a version to support the England national football team at the 2006 FIFA World Cup. The song reached a peak of No. 8 on the UK Singles Chart, and remained on the chart for a total of 5 weeks.

== Creation ==
In 2005, Christie had a hit with a Comic Relief re-release of "Amarillo" with Peter Kay that reached number 1 on the UK Singles Chart for 7 weeks in a row. The BBC Three Counties Radio presenters Ian Stringer and George Webley wrote alternate lyrics to "Amarillo" to support England at the World Cup, which the song predicts England will win. Christie was convinced to record the song using those lyrics by the BBC Radio 1 presenter Chris Moyles. The music video for it was filmed at Barnet F.C.'s Underhill Stadium in London. Christie initially said about it: "It's got a nice summery feel about it and people seem to like it" and the BBC commissioned him to review other 2006 World Cup songs competing with him. The Manchester Evening News said about "Is This the Way to the World Cup" that: "It's that cheesy, it's a classic". Like with "Amarillo" the year before, the profits for the single went to charity, specifically SportsAid.

Christie later came to regret performing the song, stating in a 2010 interview that it was "dreadful" and said he would "...never ever do it again because it was crap".

== Charts ==
"(Is This the Way to) The World Cup" entered the UK Singles Chart at number 11. The following week it reached its peak of No. 8 on the chart before dropping three consecutive weeks after to 11, 24 and 30 before exiting the charts after five weeks.
