= I Did What I Did for Maria =

Single by Tony Christie
- B-side: "Give Me Your Love Again"
- Released: June 1971
- Recorded: 1971
- Genre: Pop
- Length: 3:25
- Label: MCA
- Songwriters: Mitch Murray, Peter Callander
- Producers: Tony Christie, Mitch Murray, Peter Callander

"I Did What I Did for Maria" is a song recorded by British singer Tony Christie. It was written and produced by Mitch Murray and Peter Callander, who were also responsible for Christie's "Las Vegas" and "Avenues and Alleyways". The song is about a widower who, on the morning of his execution, recalls how he remorselessly avenged his dead wife, hence the title. It reached number two on the UK Singles Chart in June 1971, and was also a major hit in Ireland, where it also reached number two. It was a number-one hit in New Zealand, and also peaked at number three in Australia.

The track later appeared on Christie's compilation album, Definitive Collection, which reached number 1 in the UK Albums Chart in 2005.

Paper Lace included this song on their 1974 album, Paper Lace.

== Charts and certifications ==
=== Weekly charts ===
Chart (1971–1972)	Peak Position
Argentina (CAPIF)	20
Australia	3
Austria (Hitradio Ö3)	20
Belgium (Ultratop 50 Flanders)	10
Belgium (Ultratop 50 Wallonia)	17
Finland (Suomen virallinen lista)	33
France (IFOP)	66
Ireland (IRMA)	2
Netherlands (Single Top 100)	21
Netherlands (Dutch Top 40)	22
New Zealand (Listener)	1
South African Singles Chart	2
Switzerland (Schweizer Hitparade)	3
UK Singles (Official Charts)	2
West Germany (GfK)	4
