= The Brothers (band) =

UK-based band

The Brothers (also referenced in some sources as simply Brothers) were a UK-based band that scored a top ten hit on the British chart with the song, "Sing Me." The sprightly, reggae-inflected song reached number 8 on the UK Singles Chart in the Spring of 1977. The band consisted of 5 real brothers with the surname Bayou - Clarel (lead vocals), Lindsay (guitar), Gervais (keyboards and guitar), Daniel (bass) and Clarey (drums).

The Brothers all hail from Mauritius. They recorded for Bus Stop, a UK record label founded by Mitch Murray and Peter Callander. Murray and Callander, who had already helped develop the career of UK pop group Paper Lace, are credited with producing "Sing Me" and another single, "Beautiful." Murray and Callander also composed some of the group's songs, including "Beautiful," "Love Don't Change" (the B-side to "Sing Me") and "You Don't Have to Be an Angel" (the B-side to "Beautiful").

Despite releasing an album and at least one other single that same year, the band was not able to repeat its success in the UK singles chart.

== Discography ==
=== Albums ===
- Sing Me (1977) (BUSLP 8002)

=== Singles ===
- "Sing Me" (1977) (BUS 1054) #8 UK
- "Beautiful" (1977) (BUS 1056)
- "Mauritius Farewell" (1979) (Scotia - SCO 19)
- "Sunny Weather" (1981) (Diversion - DIV 116)
- "You've Got A Way With You" (1982) (Dingle's - SID 233, as The Bayou Brothers)
- "Come On Home" (1982) (Dingle's - SID 234, as The Aspeys with The Bayou Brothers)
- "Montego Bay" (1983) (Paro - PARO 007)
- "Nightschool" (1985) (TVM - TVM 100)

== See also ==
- One-hit wonders in the UK
