= Made in Sheffield (album) =

Studio album by Tony Christie
- Released: November 10, 2008
- Recorded: Yellow Arch Studios, Sheffield
- Genres: pop, rock
- Label: Decca/Autonomy
- Producers: Richard Hawley, Colin Elliott

Tony Christie chronology
Simply in Love (2006)	Made in Sheffield (2008)	Now's the Time! (2011)

Professional ratings
Review scores
Source	Rating
AllMusic	4/5 stars
NME	7/10 stars
Yahoo!	7/10 stars

Made in Sheffield is a 2008 album by the English musician and singer Tony Christie, released on 10 November 2008.

== Production ==
After hearing the song "Coles Corner" by Richard Hawley on the radio, Christie suggested that it was the type of production he should be striving for. Christie asked Hawley to be producer for a new version of the track. Hawley had previously sent him the album Coles Corner on its release in 2005 and readily agreed to produce a whole album with his co-producer Colin Elliott at their Yellow Arch Studios in Sheffield.

The recording project developed into a concept that the album should only feature songs written by Sheffield’s own songwriters, and new songs by Tony himself. Amongst those involved were the Arctic Monkeys who supplied the album's opener "Only Ones Who Know", Jarvis Cocker ("Born To Cry", a Pulp song from the Notting Hill soundtrack), a stripped down piano and trumpet reworking of The Human League's synthpop classic "Louise" and a reworking of "Coles Corner" by Richard Hawley. Also involved were lesser known city songwriters Martin Bragger who contributes two songs ("Danger Is A Woman In Love" and "Paradise Square") and Sara Jay and Mark Sheridan.

Tony Christie said of the project "We are a proud community and the artists that have hailed from Sheffield are some of the most exciting and successful UK artists in pop history. I wanted to celebrate our culture."

The album was generally positively received on release including the NME, The Observer, Times and The Guardian. The NME in particular labelled it as an 'unexpected delight and genuinely great record' and gave the album 7/10. The Guardian gave the album 4/5 labelling it 'a beautifully crafted album'. MusicOMH described it as a 'quite dignified record'.

== Track listing ==
No.	Title	Length
1.	"Only Ones Who Know" (Alex Turner)
2.	"Perfect Moon" (Sara Jay, Mark Sheridan)
3.	"Born to Cry" (Jarvis Cocker, Richard Hawley, Pulp)
4.	"All I Ever Care About is You" (Tony Christie)
5.	"Going Home Tomorrow" (Tony Christie)
6.	"Louise" ((Philip Oakey, Jo Callis, Philip Adrian Wright))
7.	"Danger is a Woman in Love" (Martin Bragger)
8.	"I'll Never Let You Down" (John Stuart, Mark Sheridan)
9.	"How Can I Entertain" (Sara Jay, Mark Sheridan)
10.	"Paradise Square" (Martin Bragger)
11.	"Coles Corner" (Richard Hawley)
