= Goodbye Sam, Hello Samantha =

1970 single by Cliff Richard

- Cover of the single released in the Netherlands

Single by Cliff Richard
- B-side: "You Never Can Tell"
- Released: 29 May 1970
- Recorded: 12 March 1970
- Studio: EMI Studios, London
- Genre: Pop
- Length: 2:50
- Label: Columbia
- Songwriter(s): Mitch Murray; Peter Callander; Geoff Stephens
- Producer(s): Norrie Paramor

Cliff Richard singles chronology
"The Joy of Living" (1970)	"Goodbye Sam, Hello Samantha" (1970)	"I Ain't Got Time Anymore" (1970)

"Goodbye Sam, Hello Samantha" is a song by Cliff Richard, released as a single in May 1970. It peaked at number 6 on the UK Singles Chart.

It was released as Richard's 50th single. Richard didn't like the song when he first heard it, but was persuaded by his manager Peter Gormley, who told him "you've got to take it away 'cause I'm sure it's going to be a hit". A German version, titled "Goodbye Sam (Das ist die Liebe)", was also released in Germany.

== Track listings ==
7": Columbia / DB 8685

1. "Goodbye Sam, Hello Samantha" – 2:50
2. "You Never Can Tell" – 2:21

7": Columbia / 1C 006-04 523 (Germany)

1. "Goodbye Sam (Das ist die Liebe)" – 2:42
2. "Kein Zug nach Gretna Green" – 3:29

== Charts ==
Chart (1970–71)	Peak position
Australia (Go-Set)	19
Australia (Kent Music Report)	29
Austria (Ö3 Austria Top 40)	10
Belgium (Ultratop 50 Flanders)	4
Belgium (Ultratop 50 Wallonia)	19
Denmark (IFPI)	8
Germany (GfK)	11
Ireland (IRMA)	1
Japan (Oricon Singles Chart)	56
Malaysia (Radio Malaysia)	1
Netherlands (Dutch Top 40)	22
Netherlands (Single Top 100)	20
New Zealand (Listener)	10
Rhodesia (Lyons Maid)	1
Singapore (Radio Singapore)	5
South Africa (Springbok Radio)	2
UK Singles (OCC)	6
