= Daddy Don't You Walk So Fast =

Single by Wayne Newton

from the album Daddy Don't You Walk So Fast
- B-side: "Echo Valley 2-6809" (U.S.); "Walking in the Sand" (Intl.)
- Released: April 8, 1972
- Genre: Pop
- Length: 3:18
- Label: Chelsea
- Songwriters: Peter Callander; Geoff Stephens
- Producer: Wes Farrell

Wayne Newton singles chronology
"I Ain't That Easy to Lose" (1971)	"Daddy Don't You Walk So Fast" (1972)	"Can't You Hear the Song?" (1972)

"Daddy Don't You Walk So Fast" is a song written by Peter Callander and Geoff Stephens and performed by Wayne Newton. It appeared on Newton's 1972 album, Daddy Don't You Walk So Fast. In the lyrics, the singer is leaving his family after falling out of love with his wife. When his daughter tries to catch up with him, saying "Daddy, don't you walk so fast", it makes him change his mind about ending his marriage.

"Daddy Don't You Walk So Fast" reached No. 3 on the U.S. adult contemporary chart and No. 4 on the Billboard Hot 100. The song spent one week at No. 1 on the Cashbox chart on August 5, 1972, and three weeks at No. 1 in Australia. It sold over one million copies and was awarded a gold disc by the RIAA in July 1972.

The song was ranked No. 10 on Billboard magazine's Top Hot 100 songs of 1972 and was also ranked No. 7 on the Kent Music Report's 25 songs of 1972.

The track was produced by Wes Farrell and arranged by Mike Melvoin.

== Charts ==
=== Weekly charts ===
Chart (1972)	Peak position
Australia	1
Canada RPM Adult Contemporary	1
Canada RPM Top Singles	3
US Billboard Hot 100	4
US Billboard Adult Contemporary	3
US Billboard Country	55
US Cash Box Top 100	1

=== Year-end charts ===
Chart (1972)	Rank
Australia	7
Canada	5
US Billboard Hot 100	10
US Cash Box Top 100	4

== Other versions ==
- Daniel Boone released the original version of the song as his debut single in 1971. It reached No. 1 in New Zealand and South Africa and No. 17 on the UK Singles Chart. It was featured on his 1971 album, Daddy Don't You Walk So Fast.
- Ronnie Dove recorded the song for his 1973 country album on MCA Records.
- Herman van Keeken made a Dutch version of this song in 1971, called "Pappie loop toch niet zo snel", which became a hit in the Netherlands and Flanders.
- Roger Johnssson wrote a Swedish text and made a Swedish version of this song called "Snälla pappa vänta på mej". This version became a No. 1 hit on the Swedish list Svensktoppen.
- Henson Cargill released a version as the B-side of his February 1972 single, "I Can't Face the Bed Alone". It was featured on his 1972 album, On the Road.
- Frank Ifield released a version on June 15, 1972 in Australia.
- Ace Cannon released a version on his 1973 album, Baby Dont Get Hooked on Me.
- Roy Clark released a version on his 1973 album, Come Live with Me.
- Tony Christie
- The Ray Conniff singers
- Vilhjálmur Vilhjálmsson - Bíddu pabbi.
- Sven Libaek Orchestra
- Lou Pride
- Charlie Rich
- The Sensations
- Jerry Vale
