= I Knew It All the Time =

Single by The Dave Clark Five
- Released: 1964
- Length: 2:26
- Label: Congress 212/Piccadilly 7N 35500 (UK B-side)
- Songwriter: Mitch Murray

"I Knew It All the Time" is a song written by Mitch Murray and recorded by The Dave Clark Five; it was originally released in 1962 in the UK as the B-side of (Pye subsidiary) Piccadilly 7N 35500 and in the US on Kapp's Congress label in 1964 The song was recorded in 1962 and is essentially a rewrite of “Wimoweh” Billboard said of the song that "this is a hit different sound from Clark entries on Epic but its got the hard rock sound growling vocal against stomping beat." Cash Box described it as "an intriguing, gospel-flavored jumper with exciting percussive bits."

== Chart performance ==
In the US, "I Knew It All the Time" peaked at #54 on the Billboard Pop Singles chart.
