= Avenues and Alleyways =

1973 single by Tony Christie

Single by Tony Christie
- A-side: "Avenues and Alleyways"
- B-side: "I Never Was A Child"
- Released: 20 October 1972
- Genre: Pop
- Label: MCA
- Songwriters: Mitch Murray, Peter Callander

Tony Christie singles chronology
"My Love Song" (1972)	"Avenues and Alleyways" (1972)	"Love and Rainy Weather" (1973)

"Avenues and Alleyways" is a 1972 single recorded by Tony Christie as the theme song for the television series The Protectors. It was written and produced by Mitch Murray and Peter Callander, who were also responsible for Christie's "Las Vegas" and "I Did What I Did for Maria". The song initially appeared on the album With Loving Feeling, released in 1972.

Following the chart-topping success of the re-release of "(Is This the Way to) Amarillo" in 2005, "Avenues and Alleyways" was also re-released and peaked at No. 26 on the UK Singles Chart; on its original release, it had only reached No. 37. On the New Zealand Listener charts in 1973 it reached No.4. It is included on the soundtrack to the 2000 film Love, Honour and Obey, starring Ray Winstone and Jude Law.
