= First Edition (Paper Lace album) =

Studio album by Paper Lace
- Released: March 1972
- Recorded: November 1971
- Genres: Pop; Rock
- Length: 44:03
- Labels: Bang (U.S.); Polydor (U.K.); Philips (U.S. reissue); Contour (U.K. reissue)
- Producer: Philip Ward

Paper Lace chronology
First Edition (1972)	And Other Bits Of Material (1974)

First Edition is a debut album from the British group Paper Lace released in 1972.

== Track list ==
All tracks are written by Paper Lace, except where noted.

No.	Title	Length
1.	"In The Morning (Morning Of My Life)" (Barry Gibb)	2:51
2.	"Stoney End" (Laura Nyro)	3:19
3.	"Lady"	3:43
4.	"I've Got You, That's Good Enough"	3:21
5.	"Threw My Love Away"	4:24
6.	"Martha (Whatever Happened)"	4:22
7.	"Games People Play" (Joe South)	3:44
8.	"Please Be My Friend" (Iain Matthews)	3:05
9.	"You Can't Touch Me"	2:38
10.	"Elsie"	3:16
11.	"Like a Rolling Stone" (Bob Dylan)	6:11
12.	"Early One Morning"	2:57
13.	"Ragamuffin Man (Mitch Murray/Peter Callander)"	2:52
