= Roberto Blanco =

German Schlager singer, actor, and entertainer

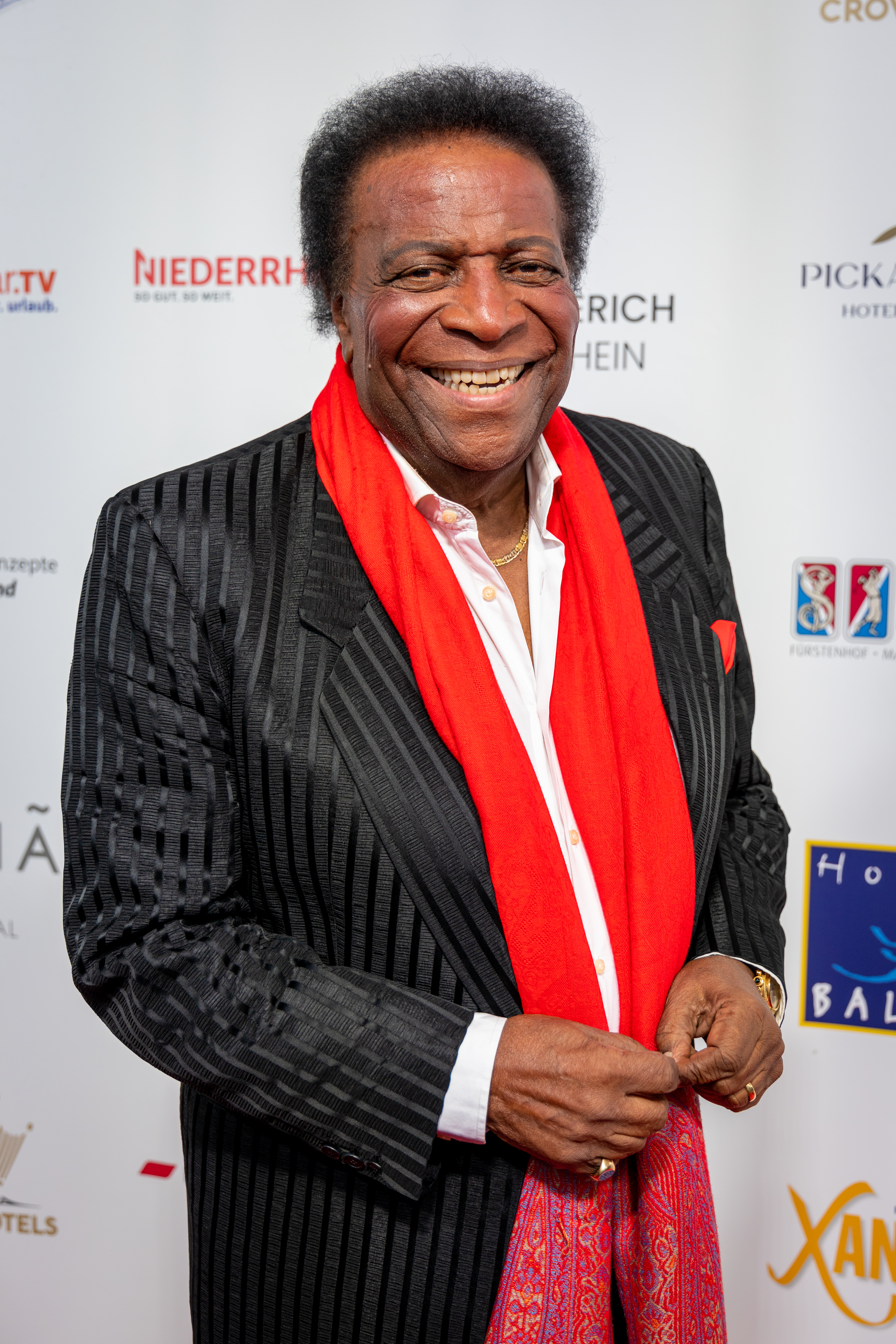
- Blanco in 2023

Background information
- Born: Roberto Zerquera Blanco; 7 June 1937 (age 89); Tunis, Tunisia
- Genres: Schlager

Roberto Zerquera Blanco (born 7 June 1937 in Tunis) is a Tunisian-born German schlager singer, actor, and entertainer of Afro-Cuban descent. He is one of the most successful entertainers of all time in German-speaking countries.

== Early life ==
Blanco was born in Tunis, Tunisia to Cuban parents Alfonso Zerquera and Mercedes Blanco. His father was a folklorist and artist, and his mother was a dancer and singer. He was raised primarily by his father after his mother died when he was two years old. He was raised in Beirut and Madrid. Blanco studied medicine in the latter, but quit after two semesters.

== Career ==
In 1956, Blanco had a chance meeting with German filmmaker Alfred Weidenmann on an airplane. Weidenmann, who was scouting locations in Spain for the film Der Stern von Afrika, cast the young man in a supporting role. Blanco moved to West Germany the following year. He became a German citizen in 1971.

His singing career began with Josephine Baker. In the 1960s, he became a hit star in his own right and appeared in various films – among them Johannes Mario Simmel penned All People Will Be Brothers and the Erich Kästner adaptation Three Men in the Snow.

In 1969, Blanco won the German "Schlager-Festspiele" with his song "Heute so, morgen so" (Today like this, tomorrow like that). Following that, Blanco recorded a number of hit albums. His music career peaked in 1972 with the song "Ein bisschen Spass muss sein" (A little fun is a must) and "Der Puppenspieler von Mexiko" (The Puppeteer of Mexico). Since then he has appeared on numerous music and variety TV shows, most frequently on ZDF's Hitparade.

== Singles ==
- 1957 – "Jesebell"
- 1957 – "Ob schwarz, ob weiß"
- 1963 – "Twistin' mit Monika"
- 1968 – "Tschumbala-Bey"
- 1968 – "Jennifer"
- 1969 – "Heute so, morgen so"
- 1969 – "Auf Liebe gibt es keine Garantie"
- 1970 – "Auf dem Kurfürstendam sagt man "Liebe""
- 1970 – "San Bernadino"
- 1971 – "Las Vegas"
- 1972 – "Ich komm' zurück nach Amarillo"
- 1972 – "Der Puppenspieler von Mexiko"
- 1972 – "Ein bisschen Spaß muss sein"
- 1973 – "Ich bin ein glücklicher Mann"
- 1973 – "Pappi, lauf doch nicht so schnell"
- 1974 – "In El Paso"
- 1976 – "Bye Bye, Fräulein"
- 1977 – "Morgen sind wir reich"
- 1978 – "Porompompom"
- 1978 – "Hey Mama Ho"
- 1978 – "Viva Maria"
- 1978 – "Wer trinkt schon gern den Wein allein"
- 1979 – "Der Clap Clap Song"
- 1979 – "Samba si! Arbeit no!"
- 1979 – "Am Tag, als es kein Benzin mehr gab"
- 1980 – "Rock 'n' Roll ist gut für die Figur"
- 1981 – "Humanaho (Alle Menschen sind Brüder)"
- 1990 – "Resi bring Bier" (duet with Tony Marshall)
- 1992 – "Limbo auf Jamaika" (duet with Tony Marshall)
- 1996 – "Da ist die Tür" (feat. Lotto King Karl)
- 1999 – "Last Christmas" (with Frank Luis y su traditional Habana Orchester)
- 2001 – "Born to Be Alive" (with The Disco Boys)
- 2004 – "Ein bisschen Spaß muss sein" (new version with Captain Jack)

== Selected filmography ==
- The Bloody Vultures of Alaska (1973)
