= The Ballad of Bonnie and Clyde =

Single by Georgie Fame
- B-side: "Beware of the Dog"
- Released: 1 December 1967
- Recorded: 1967
- Studio: De Lane Lea, London
- Genre: R&B; pop
- Length: 3:03
- Label: CBS (CBS 3124)
- Songwriters: Mitch Murray; Peter Callander
- Producer: Mike Smith

Georgie Fame singles chronology
| "Try My World" (1967) | "The Ballad of Bonnie and Clyde" (1967) | "By the Time I Get to Phoenix" (1968) |

Performance video
- "The Ballad of Bonnie and Clyde" at Beat-Club on YouTube

"The Ballad of Bonnie and Clyde" is a song, written by Mitch Murray and Peter Callander, and recorded by the British rhythm and blues musician Georgie Fame. Released as a single, the song reached number one in the UK Singles Chart for one week from 24 January 1968. The song reached number seven in the US Billboard Chart later the same year.

== Song profile ==
Fame recorded the song after seeing the then controversial gangster film Bonnie and Clyde, now considered a classic, starring Warren Beatty (as Clyde Barrow) and Faye Dunaway (as Bonnie Parker). The song, in the style of the 1920s and 1930s, features the sounds of gun battles, car chases, and police sirens, including the climactic gun battle that takes place when both Bonnie and Clyde meet their end. The instrumentation of the song includes a piano, banjo, drums, trumpets, trombones, and a bass. The piano introduction was picked up from Fats Domino's 1956 "Blue Monday".

The song is geographically inaccurate in that in the first verse they meet in Savannah, Georgia. In reality, both were from East Texas and there is no evidence the couple ever ventured that far east.

Instrumental cover versions of the song were recorded by The Ventures (on their 1968 album Flights of Fantasy) and Andre Kostelanetz (on his 1968 album For the Young at Heart).

At least two TV performances by Fame have survived, including one from the German TV pop show Beat Club. The song was also performed on French television in February 1968, by Johnny Hallyday and Sylvie Vartan.

== Chart performance ==
=== Weekly charts ===
| Chart (1967–1968) | Peak position |
|---|---|
| Australia (Go-Set) | 5 |
| Canada RPM Top Singles (2wks@#1) | 1 |
| Ireland (IRMA) | 4 |
| Italy (hitparadeitalia) | 1 |
| New Zealand (Listener) | 2 |
| UK Singles Chart | 1 |
| U.S. Billboard Hot 100 | 7 |
| U.S. Cash Box Top 100 | 6 |

=== Year-end charts ===
| Chart (1968) | Rank |
|---|---|
| Australia (Go-Set) | 18 |
| Canada | 17 |
| UK | 32 |
| U.S. Billboard Hot 100 | 29 |
| U.S. Cash Box | 19 |
