= Happy Birthday Baby =

1974 single by Tony Christie

"Happy Birthday Baby", a song written by Barry Mason and Roger Greenaway, was a hit for Tony Christie in 1974. It was also a hit for Lee Towers in 1980.

== Tony Christie version ==
"Happy Birthday Baby"

Single by Tony Christie
- B-side: "Who Am I Fooling"
- Released: 1974
- Genre: Pop
- Label: MCA Records MCA 157
- Songwriter(s): Mason, Greenaway
- Producer(s): Peter Sullivan

The song was written by Barry Mason and Roger Greenaway. It was released in the UK on MCA MCA 157 in September 1974. The B side was "Who Am I Fooling". By December 21, 1974, Billboard Magazine had recorded the single at No. 10 in the New Zealand Top 10. It peaked at No. 7, and spent a total of seven weeks in the charts.

== Charts ==
=== Weekly charts ===
Weekly chart performance for "Happy Birthday Baby" by Tony Christie
Chart (1975)	Peak position
Australia (Kent Music Report)	14
New Zealand (RMNZ)	7

=== Year-end charts ===
Year-end chart performance for "Happy Birthday Baby" by Tony Christie
Chart (1975)	Peak position
Australia (Kent Music Report)	58

== Lee Towers version ==
""Happy Birthday, Baby""

Single by Lee Towers
- B-side: "Good Morning, How Are You"
- Released: 1979
- Genre: Pop
- Songwriter(s): B. Mason, R. Greenaway
- Producer(s): Martin Duiser

Towers' version peaked at No. 38 in the Netherlands in 1980, and spent five weeks in the charts.
