= Now's the Time! =

Studio album by Tony Christie
- Released: 2011
- Recorded: 2010
- Genre: Northern Soul; pop
- Label: Acid Jazz AJXLP249 (LP); Acid Jazz AJXCD249 (CD)
- Producer: Richard Barrett

Tony Christie chronology
Made in Sheffield (2008)	Now's the Time! (2011)	The Great Irish Songbook (2015)

Now's the Time! is the nineteenth album released by Tony Christie. It was released in early 2011, on the Acid Jazz record label which had previously released recordings by Andy Bennett, Lord Large, and Geno Washington & the Ram Jam Band. It was released on both the LP and CD formats.

== Background ==
After signing with the Acid Jazz label in 2010, Christie's single "Nobody In The World" bw "Seven Hills " was released that year. The single was a Northern Soul styled single. According to the Acid Jazz label, it was his first mod single since Shel Talmy produced him in 1966. An article in Scootering mentioned the single's inclusion the proposed 2011 Acid Jazz album release. It was announced that the Northern Soul inspired album was to be released in January 2011. Christie's nineteenth studio album, Now's the Time!, was released in the UK on 7 February 2011 through Acid Jazz. Produced by Richard Barrett of All Seeing I, it included collaborations with Jarvis Cocker and Róisín Murphy. The album includes the song "Get Christie", which is a spoof of Get Carter.

== Reviews ==
Martin Townsend of the Daily Express gave it a favorable review, saying it oozed wit and style. It got a favorable review from Pop Junkie with the reviewer saying it was nearly as good as his Made in Sheffield album. Anorak gave it an 8/10 rating, singling out "Get Christie", "Nobody in the World" and the duet with Roisin Murphy for mention. In his review of the album All Music's Jon O'Brien said that Christie could have made one of the best albums of his career. In a review of Christie's Golden Anniversary Tour, and the songs performed, Graham Walker of the Sheffield Star mentioned that "Now Is The Time" which was on the album was a personal favorite of his.

== Credits ==
- Tony Christie (vocals)
- Steven Boyce Buckley (keyboards, string arrangements)
- David Lewin (keyboards, guitars, programming, horn arrangements)
- Andy Williams (keyboards)
- Dean Honer (keyboards)
- Dale Gibson (trumpet, flugelhorn)
- Michael Ward (saxes, flute, horn arrangements, background vocals)
- Cary Baylis (guitars)
- Tim McCall (guitars)
- Danny Lowe (bass guitar)
- Sean Fitzgerald (percussion)
- Nick Death Ray (percussion)
- Richard Barratt (programming)
- Sheila Gott (background vocals)
- Philly Smith (background vocals)
- Nesreen Bibi Shaw (background vocals)
- Siobhan Gallagher (background vocals)
- Róisín Murphy (vocals - track 3)

== Album info ==
LPAcid Jazz AJXLP249
Pos'n	Title	Composer	Notes #
1	"Now's The Time!"		
2	"Money Spider"		
3	"7 Hills"		Featuring – Róisín Murphy
4	"Nobody In The World"		
5	"Steal The Sun"		
6	"Longing For You Baby"		
1	"Get Christie"		
2	"Too Much Of The Sun"		
3	"Key Of U"		
4	"Workin' Overtime"		
5	"I Thank You"		
6	"Something Better"		
