= The Night Chicago Died =

1974 song by Paper Lace

- Belgian sleeve

Single by Paper Lace

from the album And Other Bits of Material, Paper Lace (US Version)
- B-side: "Can You Get It When You Want It"
- Released: 15 June 1974
- Recorded: 1974
- Genre: Pop rock; bubblegum pop
- Length: 3:30
- Label: Bus Stop (UK), Philips (Europe), Polydor (Canada), Mercury (US), Phonogram (Japan), EMI (Australia/New Zealand)
- Songwriters: Peter Callander, Mitch Murray
- Producers: Peter Callander, Mitch Murray

Paper Lace singles chronology
"Billy Don't Be a Hero" (1974)	"The Night Chicago Died" (1974)	"The Black Eyed Boys" (1974)

"The Night Chicago Died" is a song by the British group Paper Lace, written by Peter Callander and Mitch Murray. The song reached number one on the Billboard Hot 100 chart for one week in 1974, reached number 3 in the UK charts, and number 2 in Canada. It is about a fictional shoot-out between the Chicago Police and members of the Al Capone Syndicate. The narrator retells his mother's anguish while awaiting news of the fate of her husband, a Chicago policeman. This song begins with an electronic synthesizer sound impersonating a police siren. The first four lines in the Intro are spoken by the group. It also features the sound of a ticking clock, heard in the third verse.

== History ==
"The Night Chicago Died" was Paper Lace's follow-up single to "Billy Don't Be a Hero", a No. 1 hit in the U.K. but virtually unheard in the U.S. where Bo Donaldson and the Heywoods' cover reached No. 1. Callander and Murray wrote both songs.

The U.S. single received a Gold certification from the Recording Industry Association of America, signifying sales of at least half a million copies. Though the song's story is set in the United States, Paper Lace was unable to perform the song live in the U.S. at the height of its popularity because of contractual issues.

== Accuracy ==
"The Night Chicago Died" is about a shoot-out between the Chicago Police and gangsters tied to Al Capone. It was inspired by the real-life Saint Valentine's Day Massacre, although that involved Capone's men killing seven of Bugs Moran's gang members and had nothing to do with the police, though some of the gangsters did disguise themselves as police officers. No confrontation large enough to leave around one hundred police deaths ever happened. Al Capone was arrested in 1932 for income tax evasion.

The song's events supposedly take place "on the East Side of Chicago". Chicago has three commonly referred-to regions: the North Side, the West Side and the South Side. There is no East Side, as Lake Michigan is immediately east of Downtown Chicago. While there is an area of Chicago known as "East Side", it is a neighborhood on the Far South Side on the Illinois/Indiana state line. East Side is also several miles away from where Capone lived on Prairie Avenue in Chicago. Furthermore, in the 1920s, East Side was known for being a quiet, residential, and predominantly Eastern European neighborhood—a sharp contrast from the site of the bloodbath described in the song.

Songwriters Peter Callender and Mitch Murray said in interviews (most notably on Beat Club shortly after the song's smash success) that they had never been to Chicago before that time, and that their knowledge of the city and that period of its history had been based on gangster films. (Callender defended his interpretation of Chicago's geography by saying, "There's an East Side of everywhere!")

As reported by History.com:

"...in England there were at least a few young men that didn’t have all the facts straight, and in the 1970s their pop group from Nottingham turned their romantic misunderstanding of American history into a historically dubious yet gloriously catchy hit record. Though it was never intended for the American market, Paper Lace’s "The Night Chicago Died" crossed the Atlantic and became a #1 hit on the U.S. pop charts..."

Paper Lace sent the song to the mayor of Chicago, Richard Daley, who greatly disliked it. A member of Daley's staff is quoted as saying that Paper Lace should "jump in the Chicago River, placing your heads under water three times and surfacing twice. Pray tell us, are you nuts?"

== Charts ==
=== Weekly charts ===
Chart (1974)	Peak position
Australia (Kent Music Report)	1
Canada Top Singles (RPM)	2
France (IFOP)	35
Ireland (IRMA)	5
Netherlands (Single Top 100)	2
New Zealand (Listener)	1
South Africa (Springbok)	3
UK Singles Chart	3
US Billboard Hot 100	1
US Hot Adult Contemporary (Billboard)	27
US Cash Box Top 100	1

=== Year-end charts ===
Chart (1974)	Rank
Australia (Kent Music Report)	4
Canada (RPM)	26
Netherlands	25
US Billboard Hot 100	47
US Cash Box Top 100	19

== Certifications ==
Certifications for "The Night Chicago Died"
Region	Certification	Certified units/sales
United States (RIAA)	Gold	1,000,000^{^}
^{^} Shipments figures based on certification alone.

== Covers ==
- In 1974 Venezuelan singer Mirla Castellanos recorded her version of this song (translated into Spanish by her husband at the time, Miguel Ángel Landa) titled "La Noche De Chicago", which appeared on her album of the same name. Subsequently, Castellanos made a new version of this song, which was included in her 1984 compilation album 16 Grandes Éxitos.
- Also, in 1974, Mexican group La Super Banda Macho recorded their own version of this song in Spanish titled "La Noche Que Murió Chicago", whose lyrics are very different from the previous version.
- In March 1975 the Finnish singer Vicky Rosti recorded this song in Finnish titled "Kun Chicago kuoli" (When Chicago Died), which was her debut single. She reached the number one position in Finnish charts with the single by Midsummer. The Finnish lyrics are almost verbatim translation of the English originals.
- In 1994 Mexican group Banda Toro recorded this song titled "La Noche Que Chicago Murió" in a Banda music style (but with the same lyrics of La Super Banda Macho's version). This song appeared on their debut album Banda Toro.
- In 2004 Mexican group Banda Machos covered this song, also titled "La Noche Que Chicago Murió"—which sounds very similar to the La Super Banda Macho's version—as part of their album Pura Pasión.
- In 2006, Korean group Super Junior-K.R.Y. released a cover of this song entitled "The Night Chicago Died" in the Korean language, for the 2006 Korean legal drama Hyena for its soundtrack album. Their cover has the same melody, but the lyrics were entirely revised.

== Notes ==
- "The Night Chicago Died" is used with some irony by Fox Mulder on "Die Hand Die Verletzt" episode of The X-Files as an example of "Devil's music".
- On download and streaming sites, Paper Lace's recording is miscredited to the 1980s dance group Pretty Poison.
