= Central Band of the Royal British Legion =

The Central Band of the Royal British Legion
- Origin: London, England
- Genre: Military music
- Years active: 1944–present
- Label: Clovelly
- Website: Official website

The Central Band of the Royal British Legion is a concert band associated with the Royal British Legion.

In 2004, it celebrated its Diamond Jubilee, marking sixty years of music making dating back to World War II. The band’s origins stem from the Home Guard, now affectionately known as Dad's Army. Its founder members, many with First World War service, having all played in the Band of the 56th (Surrey) Battalion Home Guard based in Epsom. However, by 1944, with the possibility of a German invasion no longer a threat, the Home Guard was stood down bringing to an end four years of comradeship.

After the Dad's Army Band disbanded, a group of its musicians formed a new band under the aegis of the British Legion.

The Central Band is the Legion’s premier and 'flagship' band and as such, represents the Legion on high-profile occasions as well as fulfilling a large number of varied engagements around the country. The Central Band is no stranger to high-profile events, many of which are televised and include Royal British Legion Festival of Remembrance at the Royal Albert Hall and BBC TV's Songs of Praise, seen by millions.

The current Director of Music is Captain David Cole MVO MMus ARAM RM.

== Notable performances ==
In 2005, the band joined the Royal Philharmonic Orchestra for an End of War Commemoration concert, in which they performed world premieres written especially for the occasion by the Master of the Queen's Music, Sir Peter Maxwell Davies. In 2005 and again in 2007, the band recorded a programme for BBC Radio 2's Listen to the Band.

In 2006 and 2007, the band performed at the Wimbledon Tennis Championships, during the Ladies Finals Day and Men's Finals Day.

The band has also performed during the lunch break at several test matches at Lords, including the 2005 Ashes test. In addition to this, the band has performed at the past two Commonwealth Games Baton Relay ceremonies, playing on the forecourt outside Buckingham Palace whilst HM The Queen handed the Commonwealth Games baton to a famous athlete.

== Recordings ==
The band has made many recordings, including The Best of British, which was recorded live with Max Bygraves at the Beck Theatre.

At the end of 2004, the band recorded Celebration; this was followed with The Shadow of Your Smile in 2006. This was produced by Major John Perkins and includes "Ave Maria", "Pirates of the Caribbean", "Goodbye to Love" and "The Gladiator's Farewell".

In March 2007, the band recorded at the BBC Maida Vale studios for BBC Radio 2's Listen to the Band feature.

The band recorded their own version of the new rave band Klaxons' hit "Gravity's Rainbow" in May 2007. The band later performed this song for the fifth birthday party of MTV Two's flagship rock show, Gonzo.
