= Billy—Don't Be a Hero =

1974 single by Paper Lace

"Billy Don't Be a Hero"

Single by Paper Lace

from the album Paper Lace (US version)
- B-side: "Celia"
- Released: February 1974
- Recorded: 1974
- Genre: Pop
- Length: 3:59 (album version); 3:45 (radio edit)
- Label: Mercury
- Songwriters: Mitch Murray; Peter Callander
- Producers: Mitch Murray; Peter Callander

Paper Lace singles chronology
"Billy Don't Be a Hero" (1974)	"The Night Chicago Died" (1974)

"Billy, Don't Be a Hero"

Single by Bo Donaldson and The Heywoods

from the album Bo Donaldson and The Heywoods
- B-side: "Don't Ever Look Back"
- Released: April 1974
- Recorded: 1974
- Studio: ABC, Los Angeles, California
- Genre: Pop
- Length: 3:25
- Label: ABC
- Songwriters: Mitch Murray; Peter Callander
- Producer: Steve Barri

Bo Donaldson and The Heywoods singles chronology
"Deeper and Deeper" (1974)	"Billy, Don't Be a Hero" (1974)	"Who Do You Think You Are" (1974)

"Billy—Don't Be a Hero" is a 1974 pop song that was first a UK hit for Paper Lace and then, some months later (with its title punctuated as "Billy, Don't Be a Hero"), a US hit for Bo Donaldson and The Heywoods. The song was written and composed by two British songwriters, Mitch Murray and Peter Callander.

Because the song was released in 1974, it was associated by some listeners with the Vietnam War, though the war to which it actually refers is never identified in the lyrics. It has been suggested that the drum pattern, references to a marching band leading soldiers in blue, and "riding out" (cavalry) refer to the American Civil War. For one of the band's performances on Top of the Pops they wore Union-style uniforms, as can be seen on YouTube and on 45 single record cover.

A young woman is distraught that her fiancé chooses to enlist with Army recruiters passing through the town, causing her to implore him:

Billy, don't be a hero, Don't be a fool with your life
Billy, don't be a hero, Come back and make me your wife
And as he started to go, she said, 'Billy, keep your head low'
Billy, don't be a hero, Come back to me.

The song goes on to describe how Billy is killed in action in a pitched battle after volunteering to ride out and seek reinforcements. In the end, the heartbroken woman throws away the official letter notifying her of Billy's "heroic" death.

== Chart performances ==
Paper Lace's version of "Billy—Don't Be a Hero" reached No. 1 in the UK on 16 March 1974, and did likewise in Australia, where it spent eight weeks at the top spot. The Bo Donaldson and the Heywoods version reached No. 1 in the U.S. on the Billboard Hot 100 on 15 June 1974, and was dubbed into French for Canada. The US version sold over three and a half million copies, and was awarded a gold disc by the R.I.A.A. in June 1974. The Bo Donaldson and the Heywoods version was a massive hit in Latin America and Japan as well, but it remained largely unknown elsewhere. Billboard ranked it as the No. 21 song for 1974.

However, in 2011, it was voted No. 8 on Rolling Stone magazine's readers' poll of "10 Worst Songs of the 1970s".

=== Paper Lace version ===
==== Charts ====
===== Weekly charts =====
Chart (1974)	Peak position
Australia (Kent Music Report)	1
Canada (RPM)	51
Ireland (IRMA)	1
New Zealand (Listener)	3
UK (OCC)	1
US Billboard Hot 100	96
US Cash Box Top 100	68

===== Year-end charts =====
Chart (1974)	Rank
Australia (Kent Music Report)	2
UK	3

==== Certifications ====
Region	Certification	Certified units/sales
United Kingdom (BPI)	Gold	500,000^{^}
^{*} Sales figures based on certification alone.^{^} Shipments figures based on certification alone.

=== Bo Donaldson & the Heywoods version ===
==== Charts ====
===== Weekly charts =====
Chart (1974)	Peak position
Canada RPM Top Singles	1
Canada RPM Adult Contemporary	29
US Billboard Hot 100	1
US Billboard Easy Listening	20
US Cash Box Top 100	1

===== Year-end charts =====
Chart (1974)	Rank
Canada	13
US Billboard Hot 100	21
US Cash Box Top 100	30

==== Certifications ====
Region	Certification	Certified units/sales
United States (RIAA)	Gold	1,000,000^{^}
^{*} Sales figures based on certification alone.^{^} Shipments figures based on certification alone.

== See also ==
- List of anti-war songs
