= Peter Callander =

English songwriter and record producer

- Also known as: Robin Conrad
- Born: Peter Robin Callander; 10 October 1939; Lyndhurst, Hampshire, England
- Died: 25 February 2014 (aged 74) Harefield, Hillingdon, England
- Genre: Pop music
- Occupations: Songwriter, record producer
- Years active: 1960s–2014

Peter Robin Callander (10 October 1939 – 25 February 2014) was an English songwriter and record producer. Active from the 1960s onwards, Callander wrote or co-wrote songs that have been performed by recording artists such as Cilla Black, Tom Jones, Cliff Richard, Shirley Bassey, and the Tremeloes, amongst many others. On some songs he was credited as Robin Conrad. Callander was also a founder member of the Society of Distinguished Songwriters (SODS), a director of PRS for Music, and formed a publishing company, Callander Family Music Ltd.

== Early life ==
Born in Lyndhurst, Hampshire, he was educated at the City of London School on a scholarship, before following in his father's footsteps and training as a chef. He then moved into music publishing as a song plugger for Bron Music, and became a manager at Shapiro Bernstein Music.

== Career ==
He often worked in partnership with Mitch Murray whom he met in 1966, Murray writing the music and Callander the lyrics. The two also teamed together to produce recordings for artists such as Paper Lace, Tony Christie, and The Brothers.

Their joint compositions included "Even the Bad Times Are Good" (The Tremeloes), "The Ballad of Bonnie and Clyde" (Georgie Fame), "Goodbye Sam, Hello Samantha" (Cliff Richard), "Ragamuffin Man" (Manfred Mann), "Hitchin' a Ride" (Vanity Fare), "Turn on the Sun" (Nana Mouskouri) plus "Avenues and Alleyways", "Las Vegas", and "I Did What I Did for Maria" for Tony Christie.

In 1972, "Daddy Don't You Walk So Fast", his joint composition with Geoff Stephens, was recorded by Wayne Newton. It sold over one million copies, and was awarded a gold disc by the R.I.A.A. in July 1972.

While Callander was especially prolific during the 1960s and 1970s, his influence continued throughout his life. In 2005, Tony Christie spent seven weeks at number one on the UK Singles Chart with a charity production of the Murray and Callander–produced tune "Is This the Way to Amarillo". In an interview in The Times in which he described another Murray and Callander–penned tune, "Las Vegas", Christie said that the two "were the star songwriters of the day".

Also in 2005, Swedish pop singer Agnetha Fältskog recorded the tune "A Fool Am I", which had been a hit in the UK for Cilla Black in 1966, for Fältskog's successful comeback album, My Colouring Book, a collection of cover versions of classic 1960s pop tunes. Callendar provided the English-language lyrics to what had originally been an Italian language song.

He died at the age of 74 on 25 February 2014.

== Discography (selected) ==
=== As songwriter ===
- "A Fool Am I"; originally written by F. Carraresi (music) and A. Testa (lyrics); English lyrics by Peter Callander; recorded by Cilla Black and Agnetha Fältskog
- "Give Me Time"; originally written by Alberto Morina, Amedeo Tommasi and Pietro Melfa; English lyrics by Peter Callander; recorded by Dusty Springfield and P. J. Proby
- "The Ballad of Bonnie and Clyde" (1968); written by Mitch Murray and Peter Callander; recorded by Georgie Fame
- "The Night Chicago Died" (1974); written by Mitch Murray and Peter Callander; recorded by Paper Lace
- "Billy, Don't Be a Hero" (1974); written by Mitch Murray and Peter Callander; recorded by both Paper Lace and Bo Donaldson and The Heywoods
- "Beautiful" (1977); written by Mitch Murray and Peter Callander; recorded by The Brothers
- "Monsieur Dupont" (1969); originally written by Christian Bruhn; English lyrics by Peter Callander; recorded by Sandie Shaw
- "Suddenly You Love Me" (1967); originally written by Mario Panzeri, Daniele Pace and Laurenzo Pilat; English lyrics by Peter Callander; recorded by The Tremeloes
- "Special" (1999); written by Robert Dallas and Peter Callander, recorded by Johnny Crawfish (James Rankin)

=== As producer ===
- "Sing Me" – The Brothers (1977) (with Mitch Murray) – UK No. 8
- "Beautiful" – The Brothers (1977) (with Mitch Murray)
