= Paper Lace =

English pop rock band

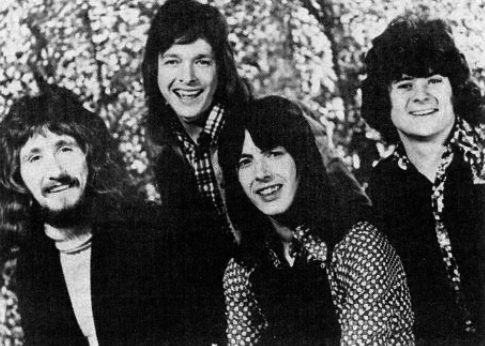
- Paper Lace 1974, left to right: Phil Wright, Mick Vaughn, Chris Morris, Cliff Fish

Background information
- Origin: Nottingham, England
- Genres: Pop rock, pop, power pop
- Years active: 1967–present
- Labels: Mercury; Polydor; Bus Stop
- Members: Phil Wright; Dave Major; Phil Hendricks
- Past members: Roy White; Dave Manders; Michael Vaughan; Peter Oliver; Jamie Moses; Cliff Fish; Chris Morris; Carlo Paul Santanna; Dale Cocoran
- Website: originalpaperlace.com

Paper Lace is an English pop rock band formed in Nottingham in 1967. They achieved fame and success in 1974 when they had three UK Top 40 hit singles, including the number one hit "Billy Don't Be a Hero".

== History ==
The core of the band formed in 1967 as Music Box. Members Cliff Fish, Dave Manders, Roy White, and Phil Wright performed covers by the likes of the Beach Boys. In 1969, they changed their name to Paper Lace. In 1972, Paper Lace released First Edition, the first of two studio albums.

Despite some TV appearances, the band achieved no mainstream success until 1973 victories on Opportunity Knocks, a talent contest series, broadcasting at that time on ITV. The band had auditioned for the programme in 1970, but they were not called to appear until 1973. According to Phil Wright (then lead singer, now lead singer of Phil Wright's Original 70s Paper Lace), the band initially questioned whether they should go on the show, but with Opportunity Knocks's weekly viewing figures of 7 million, they concluded that going on the programme was a 'no brainer'. Paper Lace won for five consecutive weeks.

On the basis of Opportunity Knocks performances, songwriters Mitch Murray and Peter Callander offered the band "Billy Don't Be a Hero", with the possibility of more songs if it took off. The song spent 14 weeks on the UK Singles Chart, three weeks of them at number one. It was followed by another Murray/Callander composition, the story song "The Night Chicago Died", which reached Number 3 in the UK in its 11 weeks on the chart. In late 1974, Murray and Callander’s third song for the band, "The Black-Eyed Boys", took Paper Lace to Number 37 in Canada and Number 11 during its 10-week UK run.

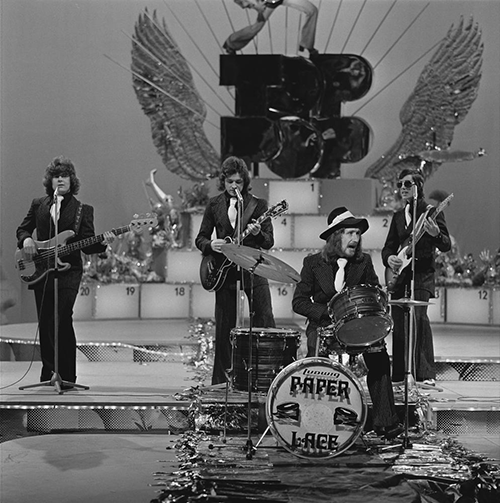
Paper Lace, 1974

In the United States, with the subject matter of "Billy Don’t Be a Hero" assumed to be about the Vietnam War, it seemed logical that the song should become a hit there. But Bo Donaldson and the Heywoods were the first to release the song in the US, and Paper Lace's version did not catch on, peaking at number 96. However, their follow-up, "The Night Chicago Died", although a historically inaccurate tale of a violent battle between the forces of gangster Al Capone and Chicago police during the Prohibition era, had no such competition. Despite contractual hassles preventing the band from performing the song in America, it topped the Billboard Hot 100 for one week. Having sold over three million copies, it was awarded a gold disc by the R.I.A.A. in August 1974.

Also in 1974, the band released its second of two studio albums, Paper Lace and Other Bits of Material (1974). The band line-up covering the three UK hit singles consisted of Philip Wright on drums/lead vocals, Mick Vaughan on lead and rhythm guitar, Cliff Fish on bass guitar, and Chris Morris on guitar and vocals. Later that year, Carlo Paul Santanna joined Paper Lace on the advice of management as a fifth band member. This membership was very short-lived; in fact, it only lasted for six months.

They were invited to perform on the Royal Variety Performance in front of the Queen Mother. However, as musical tastes and styles evolved in the mid-1970s, the band's popularity waned, and by early 1976 Vaughan and Morris had left the band, replaced alongside Wright by Jamie Moses from 1975 to 1978 and Peter Oliver (previously with The New Seekers).

In 1978, the band re-surfaced briefly with a sing-along version of "We've Got the Whole World in Our Hands" with their local football team, Nottingham Forest F.C. (Sendra, 2006). The 7-inch single, with "The Nottingham Forest March" as the B-side, spent six weeks on the UK chart and reached Number 24, but went Top 10 in the Netherlands.

Paper Lace disbanded in 1984, but Phil Wright and Cliff Fish reformed the band in 2009.

In 1990, three original Paper Lace members, Philip Wright, Mick Vaughan, and Chris Morris, received financial backing to re-record "Billy Don't Be a Hero" with an up-to-date sound. However, it was never released because, when the Gulf War began, the BBC banned songs it deemed inappropriate to broadcast during wartime, and "Billy Don't Be A Hero" was among them.

In 1997, Wright joined the band Sons and Lovers but left in 2008. He continues to perform with the reformed Paper Lace, now known as Philip Wright's Paper Lace. The band members are Phil Wright (drums, lead vocal), Dale Corcoran (bass and vocals), Dave Major (keyboards and vocals), and Phil Hendriks (lead guitar and vocals).

Carlo Paul Santanna died in June 2022.

Cliff Fish died from cancer on 14 April 2023 at the age of 73. They released a new album of songs that are recently re-recorded songs from the hit album Paper Lace And Other Bits Of Material. The CD is entitled It's Worth It and is dedicated to the life and memory of original bassist Fish.

Dale Cocoran, the bassist who replaced Cliff Fish, was diagnosed with cancer in December 2025, and was given a 3 month prognosis. He lost his battle with cancer on 1 March 2026, age 59.

== Hit era band members ==
- Phil Wright (born Philip Wright, 9 April 1948, St Ann's, Nottingham, England) — drums/lead vocals
- Mick Vaughan (born Robert Michael Vaughan, 27 July 1950, Sheffield, Yorkshire) – lead/rhythm guitar/arranger/backing vocals
- Cliff Fish (born Clifford Victor Fish, 13 August 1949, Ripley, Derbyshire, died 14 April 2023) – bass guitar/backing vocals
- Chris Morris (born Christopher Morris, 1 November 1954, Nottingham, England) – rhythm/lead guitar/keyboards/backing vocals

== Discography ==
=== Studio albums ===
List of albums, with chart positions
Title	Album details	Peak chart positions		
Title	Album details	AUS	CAN	US
First Edition	Released: March 1972; Format: LP; Label: Philips (6382 101)	—	—	—
Paper Lace and Other Bits of Material	Released: June 1974; Format: LP; Label: Bus Stop (BUSLP 8001)	32	74	124

=== Singles ===
Year	Single	Peak chart positions							Label
Year	Single	UK	AUS	BEL	CAN	IRE	NZ	US	Label
1971	"You Can't Touch Me"	—	—	—	—	—	—	—	Concord CON 020
1972	"In the Morning (Morning of My Life)"	—	—	—	—	—	—	—	Concord CON 021
1973	"Ragamuffin Man"	—	—	—	—	—	—	—	Concord CON 027
1974	"Billy Don't Be a Hero"	1	1	—	51	1	3	96	Bus Stop Bus 1014
1974	"The Night Chicago Died"	3	1	—	2	5	1	1	Bus Stop Bus 1016
1974	"The Black-Eyed Boys"	11	23	—	37	7	—	41	Bus Stop Bus 1019
1975	"Hitchin' a Ride '75"	55 (Note: Chart position is from the official UK "Breakers List".)	—	—	—	—	16	—	Bus Stop Bus 1024
1975	"So What If I Am"	—	—	—	64	—	—	—	Bus Stop Bus 1026
1976	"I Think I'm Gonna Like It"	—	—	—	—	—	—	—	EMI EMI 2486
1978	"We've Got the Whole World in Our Hands"	24	—	1	—	—	—	—	Warner Bros K 171i7

=== CD releases ===
- Paper Lace and Other Material / First Edition (Double CD) – Cherry Red / 7t's Label Cat No. Glam Cdd 109; both albums, plus B-sides to all singles released until 1975

== See also ==
- Mercury Records
- Polydor Records
