= Big George =

British musician and composer (1957–2011)

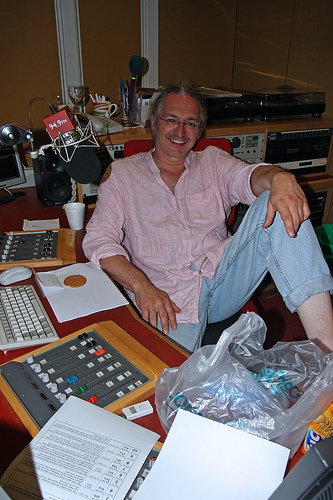
- Big George in 2008
- Born: George Webley; 29 May 1957; Clapham, London, England
- Died: 7 May 2011 (aged 53); Milton Keynes, England
- Occupations: Broadcaster, musician, composer, bandleader
- Spouse: Sheila Webley (?–2011) (his death)
- Children: 4

George Webley (29 May 1957 – 7 May 2011), better known by the stage name Big George, was a British musician, composer, bandleader and broadcaster who has been described as one of Britain's most successful theme music writers.

== Early life ==
Webley was born in Clapham, London. His aunt Vera was the fan club secretary for Frankie Laine, who was Webley's godfather on 1 June 1957. His first introduction to music was when Donald Swann attended his primary school to play to all the pupils after the school's music teacher died. Webley later said "From the first moment he lifted the piano lid, I knew the direction my life was going to take."

Webley left school at the age of 14 to go on the road with a showband. He became friends with and regularly accompanied Herbie Flowers in his late teens after writing to the bassist for advice and was a session bass player until the age of 30.

== Music career ==
Webley became a musical director for EMI at 30 and produced dozens of chart records. In 1989 he became bandleader on Jameson Tonight with Derek Jameson and Shane Richie. He composed or arranged the theme music for the television programmes Have I Got News for You, The Office, Room 101, and The Graham Norton Show as well as play-out music for One Foot in the Grave (for which he said he was paid more than the more famous Have I Got News for You theme).

Webley composed numerous other themes for the National Theatre, Arts Theatre, ballet, and radio including Ian McMillan's East Coast Girls, Emma Clarke's Share and Share Alike, and Neil Mossey's Stockport So Good They Named It Once.

== Broadcasting career ==
Webley began presenting the Saturday late show on GLR in 1994 and continued until 1996 when he suffered a heart attack whilst on the air. He successfully finished the show but was forced to take the next three years off to fully recover.

Upon his return in 1999, Webley presented the BBC Two educational series Music File, which won the Prix La Basle award for educational excellence. In 2002, he won the Sony Radio Academy Gold Award for Best Music Presenter whilst on BBC Three Counties, where he launched "Cabbie Chat – The Rank Opinion", which ran every morning on his Milton Keynes Breakfast programme. The idea was to ask the cab drivers of Milton Keynes their opinions on the day's news. It lasted until Webley offended some of the drivers over a news item about taxi drivers.

He appeared as an expert musicologist on various TV and radio programmes, including The Big Breakfast, Esther, Kilroy, 5Live Breakfast with Nicky Campbell, Radio 4's Today, John Peel's Home Truths, Moral Notes, and Landmark Places with Laurie Taylor. He wrote, presented and/or produced documentaries for Radio 4, including Playing Second Fiddle and Sense of Place.

He produced over three dozen parodies, songs and live performances for the Radio 1 Roadshow with Chris Moyles, who described him in his book The Gospel According to Chris Moyles as a genius. He was also mentioned in Angie Bowie's biography Backstage Passes (Life on the Wildside with David Bowie) and in Bruce Thomas: The Big Wheel.

== BBC London 94.9 (2006–2011) ==
Webley joined BBC London 94.9 in August 2006. He hosted his radio show on BBC London 94.9 for four years. He first presented the 2 am until 6 am slot, Monday to Friday until 2 January 2009. From 5 January 2009 until January 2010, he presented the same type of phone-in show at the earlier time of 10 pm until 2 am, Monday to Friday. In January 2010, he returned to overnight shows on Tuesdays to Saturdays. On his radio show, the show's topics were usually concerned with issues about London and the day's news stories. He was known to be witty, enthusiastic about music and to have an impressive general knowledge.

He was also a regular contributor on Network BBC radio programmes including those of Simon Mayo and Paul Gambaccini, the Today programme, and 5Live Breakfast with Nicky Campbell.

He presented the BBC London 94.9 overnight show from August 2006, at the time of his death occupying the 2 am until 6 am slot Monday to Saturday. One of the features of the show was the 'moan in', where listeners were given the opportunity to vent their frustrations about various issues. Topics of discussion were generally those dealt with by tabloid newspapers. The format was very much akin to American talk radio.

== Live band ==
His band the G Spot played their first gig on 28 August 2010 for Natalie Cassidy at the National Theatre, South Bank, London. The performance was filmed for a reality show to be shown later that year on E4.

== Personal life and death ==
Webley was married to Sheila and had two sons, two daughters, and three grandchildren. At the time of his death, he was in a relationship with fellow broadcaster JoAnne Good.

Webley died on 7 May 2011 at the age of 53 after collapsing at his family home in Milton Keynes from a heart attack. An inquest at Milton Keynes Coroner's Court resulted in a verdict of death by misadventure after the coroner heard that Webley, who had a history of heart disease, had taken the Class B drug mephedrone prior to the heart attack.
