= (Is This the Way to) Amarillo =

1971 single by Tony Christie

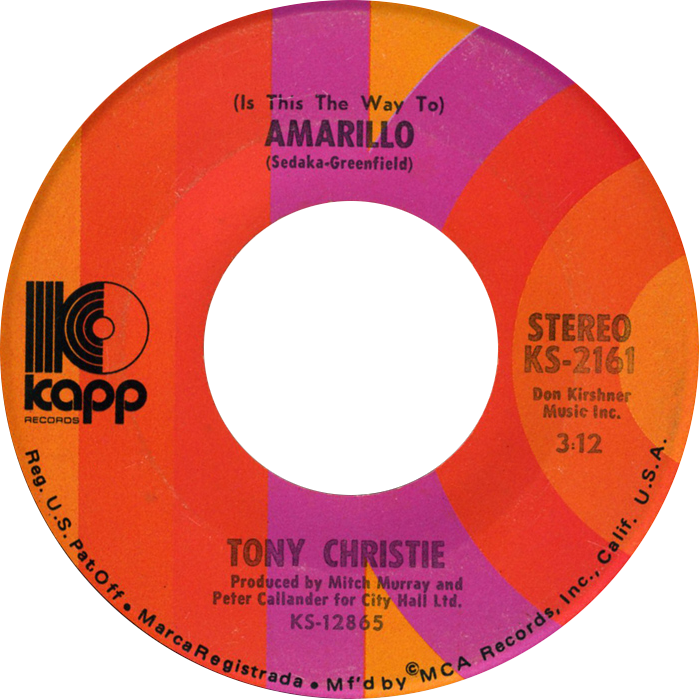
- A-side label of the US single

Single by Tony Christie

from the album With Loving Feeling
- B-side: "Love Is a Friend of Mine"
- Released: November 1971
- Genre: Pop; schlager
- Length: 3:35 (album and video version); 3:12 (single version)
- Label: MCA (UK and Europe); Kapp (US)
- Songwriters: Neil Sedaka; Howard Greenfield
- Producers: Tony Christie; Peter Callander; Mitch Murray

Tony Christie singles chronology
| "Have You Ever Been to Georgia?" (1971) | "(Is This the Way to) Amarillo" (1971) | "Don't Go Down to Reno" (1971) |

"(Is This the Way to) Amarillo" is a song written by Neil Sedaka and Howard Greenfield. It is about a man traveling to Amarillo, Texas, to find his girlfriend Marie.

Written by two Americans with a strong country-western lyrical theme, the song was first released in Europe, where it has become much more popular than in the composers' native country, with a big-band/orchestral pop arrangement sung by Tony Christie. Christie's version was a major hit in Europe and a modest success in his native United Kingdom upon its release, then became even more popular in 2005 when the song was reissued. As Christie's version failed to make a major impact in the U.S., Sedaka released his own recording of the song in 1977, which narrowly missed the top 40 but was an easy listening hit in the U.S. and Canada.

== Background ==
The song is based on a rhythmic feel Sedaka borrowed from "Hitchin' a Ride" by Vanity Fare. The song was originally to be titled "Is This the Way to Pensacola" referring to Pensacola, Florida, but Sedaka felt that Amarillo worked better than Pensacola.

== Tony Christie version ==
The song was recorded by Tony Christie and released in the UK in November 1971, initially reaching number 18 on the UK Singles Chart. However, it was a substantially bigger hit at that time across Continental Europe, including in Germany and Spain, where it reached number one. In the U.S., however, Christie's record stalled at #121 on the Bubbling Under the Hot 100. Following the re-issue of Christie's version in 2005 in aid of the charity Comic Relief, promoted with a video featuring comedian Peter Kay, the song reached number 1 in the UK.

In 2006, the song was played at the World Cup Final in Berlin and was also played by the Central Band of the Royal British Legion on Centre Court at Wimbledon before the start of the Men's Singles final.

=== Chart history ===
==== Weekly charts ====
| Chart (1971–72) | Peak position |
|---|---|
| Argentina (Top 20) | 3 |
| Australia (KMR) | 10 |
| Austria (Hitradio Ö3) | 1 |
| Belgium (Ultratop 50 Flanders) | 1 |
| Belgium (Ultratop 50 Wallonia) | 15 |
| Finland (Suomen virallinen lista) | 7 |
| West Germany (GfK) | 1 |
| Ireland (IRMA) | 3 |
| Netherlands (Single Top 100) | 4 |
| Netherlands (Dutch Top 40) | 4 |
| South Africa (Springbok Radio) | 6 |
| Spain | 1 |
| New Zealand (Listener) | 2 |
| South African Singles Chart | 6 |
| Switzerland (Schweizer Hitparade) | 3 |
| UK (OCC) | 18 |
| US Billboard Hot 100 | 121 |

==== Year-end charts ====
| Chart (1972) | Rank |
|---|---|
| Australia | 68 |

== Neil Sedaka version ==
"Amarillo"
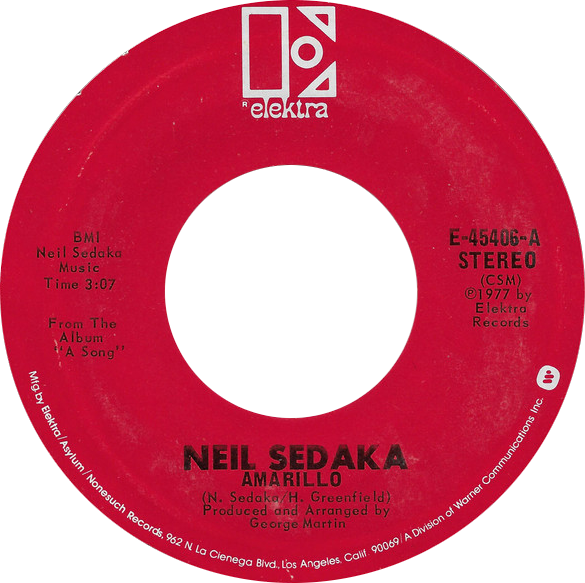
- One of side-A labels of the US single

Single by Neil Sedaka

from the album A Song
- B-side: "The Leaving Game"
- Released: May 1977
- Recorded: 1977
- Genre: Pop
- Length: 3:07
- Label: Elektra (US); Polydor (Europe)
- Songwriters: Neil Sedaka, Howard Greenfield
- Producer: George Martin

Neil Sedaka singles chronology
| "You Gotta Make Your Own Sunshine" (1976) | "Amarillo" (1977) | "Alone at Last" (1977) |

In the United States, Neil Sedaka, the writer of the song and a man who had recently returned to prominence as a pop singer in the mid-1970s after a decade of relative obscurity, recorded his own version of the song, released under a shortened title of "Amarillo". Produced and arranged by George Martin, Sedaka's version of "Amarillo" got to number 44 on the U.S. Billboard Hot 100 and number four on the Adult Contemporary chart in 1977; in Canada, Sedaka reached number two on the Adult Contemporary chart.

=== Chart performance ===
==== Weekly singles charts ====
| Chart (1977) | Peak position |
|---|---|
| Canada RPM Top Singles | 54 |
| Canada RPM Adult Contemporary | 2 |
| U.S. Billboard Hot 100 | 44 |
| U.S. Billboard Adult Contemporary | 4 |

== Tony Christie featuring Peter Kay version ==
"(Is This the Way to) Amarillo"

Single by Tony Christie featuring Peter Kay
- Released: March 14, 2005
- Genre: Pop; schlager
- Length: 3:12
- Songwriters: Neil Sedaka; Howard Greenfield
- Producer: Tony Christie

Peter Kay singles chronology
| "(Is This the Way to) Amarillo" (2005) | "I'm Gonna Be (500 Miles)" (2007) |

In 2002, Tony Christie's version was used in the Channel 4 sitcom Phoenix Nights. The song was then re-released on March 14, 2005, to raise money for Comic Relief. The video features Peter Kay, Tony Christie and other celebrities, including William Roache, Anne Kirkbride, Jim Bowen, Ronnie Corbett, Michael Parkinson and Geoffrey Hayes.

=== Music video ===
In the accompanying video, Peter Kay mimed the song accompanied by various celebrities including Brian May, Roger Taylor, Shakin' Stevens, Shaun Ryder, Bez, Paddy McGuinness, Michael Parkinson, Heather Mills, Danny Baker, Ronnie Corbett, Mr Blobby, Jim Bowen, Jimmy Savile, look-alikes of Mahatma Gandhi and Cliff Richard, William Roache, Anne Kirkbride, Sally Lindsay, Bernie Clifton, Keith Harris and Orville the Duck, Sooty, Sweep, Geoffrey Hayes and Bungle as well as Tony Christie himself.

In the first few cameos, Max and Paddy from Peter Kay's Phoenix Nights and its spin-off appear together, arguing and eventually fighting in the Granada Studios' corridor. This is one of many appearances of characters from Kay's TV series, including Paddy's tennis-playing cellmate Cliff from Max and Paddy's Road to Nowhere, and both a football team for people with dwarfism and Brian Potter from Phoenix Nights. The video consists almost entirely of Kay walking towards the camera flanked by different pairings of the celebrities, in front of increasingly bizarre and unlikely backgrounds.

From 2012 onwards, any repeat airing of the music video on television is now a re-edited version which takes out the appearance of Savile. In October 2012, a series of revelations showed Savile to be a prolific repeated child sex offender, thus his appearance in the video was edited out for future broadcasts. The re-edited version is mainly the same as the original except the short 15-second scene with Savile who joined Peter Kay and actress Sally Lindsay is now re-edited to show Lindsay and Kay only, with a slowed down and repeated showing of Lindsay on her own next to Kay to fill the gap left by the absence of Savile, thus eliminating Savile from the 15-second section. The original version remains on YouTube. In October 2020, a re-edited version was released on Peter Kay's official YouTube channel, which eliminated Sally Lindsay's appearance in the video, when she appeared with Peter and Savile – the newly re-edited version has the Tony Christie appearance moved to replace Savile's section, making this version slightly shorter in length.

==== Big Night In version ====
On April 23, 2020, BBC One broadcast The Big Night In, a telethon to support those affected by the COVID-19 pandemic.

As part of the running order, Peter Kay created an updated version of the music video. The video featured updated performances from Kay and Tony Christie, combined with repeated footage from the 2005 music video and submissions from key workers such as fire-fighters, NHS staff and social care workers.

=== Chart performance ===
This time around, the song peaked at number one on the UK singles chart, and remained there for seven weeks before finally being knocked off by "Lonely" by Akon. It went on to become the UK's best-selling single of 2005. During its success, the song was credited in chart rundowns and other media appearances to "Tony Christie featuring Peter Kay". However, Kay does not appear on the record, since it is a re-issue of the original version and not a re-recording.

Having sold 1.2 million copies by the end of 2009, "(Is This the Way to) Amarillo" was the fourth best-selling single of the 2000s in the UK, behind "Anything Is Possible"/"Evergreen" by Will Young, "Unchained Melody" by Gareth Gates, and "It Wasn't Me" by Shaggy featuring Rikrok. As of March 2017, it has sold 1.28 million copies.

=== Charts ===
==== Weekly charts ====
| Chart (2005) | Peak position |
|---|---|
| Europe (European Hot 100 Singles) | 3 |
| Ireland (IRMA) | 1 |
| Scottish Singles Sales (Official Charts) | 1 |
| UK Singles Downloads (Official Charts) | 1 |
| UK Singles (Official Charts) | 1 |

==== Year-end charts ====
| Chart (2005) | Rank |
|---|---|
| Europe (Eurochart Hot 100) | 37 |
| UK Singles (OCC) | 1 |

==== Decade-end charts ====
| Chart (2000–2009) | Rank |
|---|---|
| UK Singles (OCC) | 4 |

=== Certifications ===
| Region | Certification | Certified units/sales |
|---|---|---|
| United Kingdom (BPI) | 2× Platinum | 1,280,000 |

=== Track listing ===
- CD single
1. "(Is This the Way to) Amarillo" – 3:12
2. "Amarillo" - (club mix) – 3:52
3. "The Laughing Record" – Nicola Green – 2:41
4. "(Is This the Way to) Amarillo" – (music video) – 3:36
- DVD single
1. "(Is This the Way to) Amarillo" (music video) – 3:35
2. "Amarillo" – (club mix) – 3:52
3. "(Is This the Way to) Amarillo" – (Instrumental w/Photo Gallery) – 3:36

== Is This the Way to Armadillo ==
Is This the Way to Armadillo is a spoof video of the song "Is This the Way to Amarillo" produced by the Royal Dragoon Guards stationed in Iraq at Al-Faw towards the end of their 6-month deployment there. The video was emailed so frequently on May 13, 2005, it crashed a server at the Ministry of Defence. According to the Evening Standard, the crashing of the server caused systems to go down at various British military establishments, and the MoD was forced to issue instructions to delete all instances of the video.

The "Peter Kay" character is credited as "Lucky Pierre", an obscure sexual reference.

== (Is This the Way to) The World Cup ==
"(Is This the Way to) The World Cup"

Single by Tony Christie
- Released: 29 May 2006
- Label: Tug Records
- Lyricists: Ian Stringer and George Webley

In 2006, a version of "Is This the Way to Amarillo" was released with lyrics written by Ian Stringer and George Webley and published by Tug Records, titled "(Is This the Way to) The World Cup". It was created as a version to support the England national football team at the 2006 FIFA World Cup. The song reached a peak of No. 8 on the UK Singles Chart, remaining on the charts for 5 weeks.

== Other cover versions ==
Dutch singer Albert West covered the song in 1988. After the successful re-release of the song in the UK, Tony Christie re-recorded it with the Hermes House Band; this version charted in Germany in 2005. There is also a version by the Les Humphries Singers and a version in German by Roberto Blanco. There is also a 1971 version on the MGM label (K 14360) by a band called English House, produced by Terry Slater. The A-side was "Music Is the Voice of Love" composed by Terry Slater and Phil Everly. The song has also been covered in Czech as "Kvítek mandragory" by Helena Vondráčková and as "Napis Na Dverich" by Jiri Hromadka.

== Parody versions ==
In 2003, Gala Bingo ran a series of adverts with a jingle based on the tune of "Is This The Way to Amarillo?".

In April 2020, British comedian Paddy McGuinness tweeted a video of him singing a parody version referring to Dominic Cummings, special political adviser to British Prime Minister Boris Johnson, breaking the rules of the UK's COVID-19 pandemic lockdown rules when he travelled from his home in London to his father's home in Durham, later taking a day trip to Barnard Castle. The lyrics of the song were changed to "Is this the way to Barnard Castle? Where sweet Mary waits for me."
