= Mitch Murray =

English songwriter, record producer, and author

Mitch Murray CBE
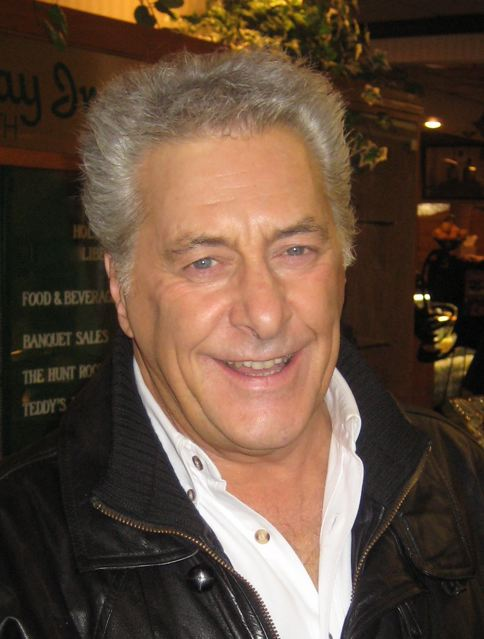

Background information
- Born: Lionel Michael Stitcher; 30 January 1940 (age 86); Hove, Sussex, England
- Genre: Pop
- Occupations: Songwriter, record producer, author
- Years active: 1960s–present

Mitch Murray CBE (born Lionel Michael Stitcher; 30 January 1940) is an English songwriter, record producer and author. He has won two Ivor Novello Awards, including the Jimmy Kennedy Award. Murray has written, or co-written, songs that have produced five UK and three US chart-topping records. He has also been awarded the Gold Badge of Merit by the British Academy of Songwriters, Composers and Authors.

== Biography ==
=== Early life ===
He was born Lionel Michael Stitcher in Hove, Sussex, England. In 1968, he changed his legal name by deed poll to Mitch Murray.

=== Musical career ===
Murray's first major songwriting success was "How Do You Do It?" It was picked up by producer George Martin, who insisted that the Beatles record it as their first single. The recording remained officially unreleased until it appeared on Anthology 1 in 1995. Martin let them release "Love Me Do" instead, passing "How Do You Do It?" to another young Liverpool-based group, Gerry and the Pacemakers. Their version launched their career with a UK Number 1 single the following spring. Thus encouraged, Murray sent them another of his songs, "I Like It", which became their second single and also topped the UK Singles Chart.

He had further success throughout the next ten years, writing "You Were Made for Me" and "I'm Telling You Now" for Freddie and the Dreamers, the latter in collaboration with their frontman, Freddie Garrity; and "I Knew It All the Time" recorded in 1964 by the Dave Clark Five. Murray's 1964 book, How to Write a Hit Song, inspired Sting, then a 12-year-old schoolboy, to start writing songs. Sting now refers to Murray as "My Mentor", and wrote the foreword to Mitch Murray's Handbook for the Terrified Speaker (Valium in a Volume).

Most of Murray's subsequent hits were written with Peter Callander, among them "Even the Bad Times Are Good" (the Tremeloes), "The Ballad of Bonnie and Clyde" (Georgie Fame), "Goodbye Sam, Hello Samantha" (Cliff Richard), "Ragamuffin Man" (Manfred Mann), "Hitchin' a Ride" (Vanity Fare), "Turn On The Sun" (Nana Mouskouri) and "Avenues and Alleyways", "Las Vegas", and "I Did What I Did for Maria" for Tony Christie.

Murray and Callander were also Christie's producers, and produced "Is This the Way to Amarillo?" (written by Neil Sedaka and Howard Greenfield). In an interview in The Times in which Christie described another Murray-Callander penned tune, "Las Vegas", he noted that the two "were the star songwriters of the day".

After writing many hits for other people, in October 1965 Murray had a hit single as a performer, with his humorous composition, "Down Came the Rain", issued on Fontana Records under the moniker Mister Murray, with "Whatever Happened to Music" on the B-side. It missed the Record Retailer Top 50, but reached number 30 in the NME chart. An Italian version of "Down Came the Rain", under the name "Una ragazza in due" ("A girl for two") with lyrics unrelated to the original, has been performed by various artists, among them I Giganti, Ornella Vanoni and Mina. Murray also wrote "My Brother" which became a children's favourite when recorded by Terry Scott in 1962.

Later, Murray and Callander formed their own record label, Bus Stop, through which they launched the career of Paper Lace. Their first two singles, released in 1974, were both written by Murray and Callander: "Billy Don't Be a Hero" (number one in the UK, with a cover version by Bo Donaldson and The Heywoods reaching number one in the US), and "The Night Chicago Died" (number one in the US). Another song Murray was involved in was "Sing Me", a UK Top Ten hit for one-hit wonders, The Brothers, in 1977.

In 1968, Murray became the youngest ever director of PRS for Music. In 1971, he conceived and founded the Society Of Distinguished Songwriters (SODS). Current members include Sir Tim Rice, Guy Chambers, Gary Barlow, David Arnold, Mike Batt, Justin Hayward, Don Black, Marty Wilde, Ricky Wilde, and more than thirty others. Bill Martin, who was also a founding member, died in April 2020.

Murray was appointed Commander of the Order of the British Empire (CBE) in the 2019 Birthday Honours for services to music.

== Comedy ==
In the mid-1980s, just before the privatisation of British Telecom, Murray wrote and starred in a series of comedy programmes, The Telefun Show, which were only available for listening via the telephone (by dialling 01–246 8070 in the UK) in a similar way to the contemporary Dial-A-Disc service, which he also presented and which attracted up to 300,000 calls per day.

After "Down Came The Rain", Murray built up a reputation for comedy in many areas, including voice characterisation for movies and radio commercials, as well as for after-dinner speaking.

== Author and speechwriter ==
Murray is now regarded as one of Britain's leading professional humorous speechwriters, and has written several best-selling books on the subject including Mitch Murray's One-Liners For Weddings (1994), Mitch Murray's One-Liners For Business and Mitch Murray's One-Liners for Speeches on Special Occasions (1997).

== Personal life ==
Murray was married to the singer and actress Grazina Frame, but they divorced in 1980. They have two daughters, Gina and Mazz. Mazz, who was Bob Monkhouse's god-daughter, starred for nine years as Killer Queen in the musical We Will Rock You. Gina starred in the West End productions of The Full Monty and Chicago. They worked together in 2020 as vocalists in 'Woman' The Band with Brian May. Murray's grandson, Max, is also an actor, known for his role in EastEnders.

Murray resides in the Isle of Man.
