= Tony Christie =

English musician and singer (born 1943)

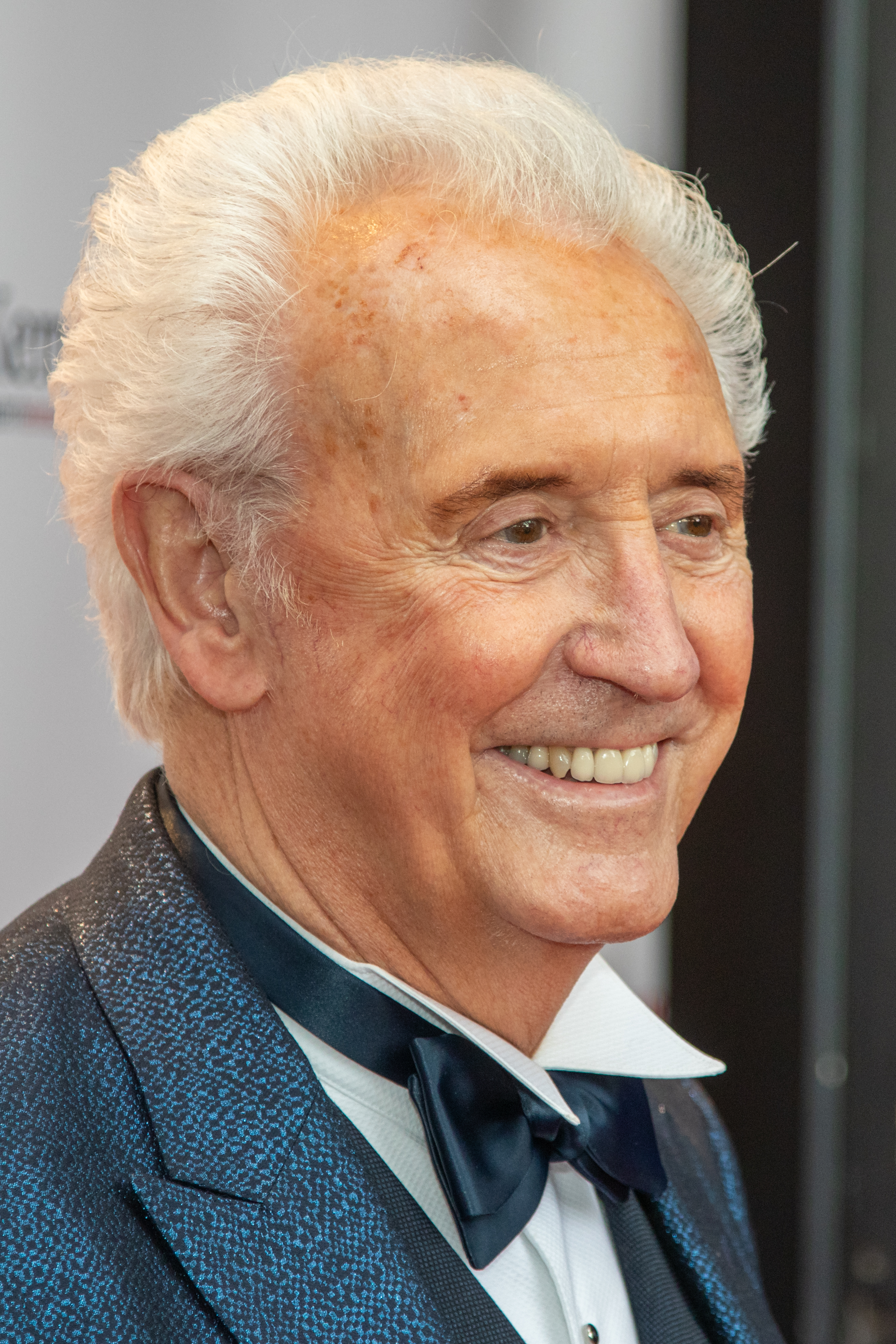
- Christie in August 2021
- Born: Anthony Fitzgerald; 25 April 1943 (age 83); Conisbrough, South Yorkshire, England
- Occupations: Musician; singer-songwriter
- Years active: 1966–present
- Spouse: Sue Christie (m. 1968)
- Children: 3
- Musical career
- Genres: Pop; rock; schlager; brega
- Instrument: Vocals
- Website: tonychristie.com

Anthony Fitzgerald (born 25 April 1943), known professionally as Tony Christie, is an English musician and singer. He found prominence in the early 1970s with successful singles including "Las Vegas", "I Did What I Did for Maria" and "Avenues and Alleyways". In 2005, he achieved a UK number 1 album and single after his 1971 hit "(Is This the Way to) Amarillo" was reissued in aid of Comic Relief.

== Career ==
=== 1960s to 1970s ===
Born Anthony Fitzgerald, Christie is the grandson of Martin Thomas Fitzgerald, from Carrowkilleen, Hollymount, County Mayo in Ireland, who was a coal-miner in Conisbrough and played the squeezebox. Tony's grandmother, from Galway, Ireland, played fiddle. Tony's father Patrick Fitzgerald was an accountant at the Conisbrough mine and played the piano at home, where Tony first sang as a boy. Tony adopted his stage name after seeing the 1965 film Darling, starring Julie Christie.

Discovered and managed by Harvey Lisberg, Christie worked in an accounts office in Sheffield and sang in northern working men's clubs at night. In 1966 he formed the group Tony Christie and the Trackers with Jimmy Page (Led Zeppelin) on guitar and released a record written by Christie which didn't do well. He had three hits in 1971 on the MCA Records label, beginning with "Las Vegas" which reached number 21 in the UK, and went on to have two Top Twenty hits in the UK Singles Chart with "I Did What I Did for Maria", which reached number two, and "(Is This the Way to) Amarillo", which peaked at number 18, all in 1971. In 1973 he had a minor hit with "Avenues and Alleyways", which reached number 37 and was the theme music to the television series The Protectors. In 1976 "Drive Safely, Darlin'" reached no. 35 in the UK. "(Is This the Way to) Amarillo" had sold more than one million copies by September 1972, and was awarded a gold disc. His early songs were dramatic big-voiced numbers, many of which were written by Mitch Murray and Peter Callander.

Christie recorded albums regularly throughout the 1970s and made infrequent appearances on the charts. His album With Loving Feeling sold well, boosted by the hit single "(Is This The Way to) Amarillo". He recorded an album in the United States in 1973 with record producer Snuff Garrett, which did little to stop his commercial slide. A live album followed which sold relatively better, but by the mid-1970s recorded work became rarer and stage work took preference. In June 1972 he was invited to take part in the music festival The Golden Orpheus in Bulgaria, a performance which was recorded and published on vinyl by the government musical company Balkanton.

Christie played the role of Magaldi on the original 1976 album recording of Evita (singing the solo song "On this Night of a Thousand Stars" and a duet with Julie Covington, "Eva And Magaldi/Eva, Beware Of The City") and sought to represent the UK in the 1976 Eurovision Song Contest, with the song "The Queen of the Mardi Gras" but came third in the contest to select an entrant, behind eventual contest winners Brotherhood of Man.

=== 1980s to 1990s ===
Although his popularity waned in his native Britain through most of the 1980s and 1990s, Christie maintained a successful singing career in continental Europe during this period. This was especially so in Germany, with four albums recorded with German producer Jack White, especially their first album collaboration Welcome to My Music, reaching number 7 in the German charts and going platinum. From 1991 to 2002, Christie recorded nine albums especially for the German market.

In 1999 Christie sang the Jarvis Cocker-penned UK top ten hit "Walk like a Panther", recorded by the Sheffield band All Seeing I.

=== 2000 to 2010 ===
In 2002, "(Is This the Way to) Amarillo" was used in the TV comedy series Peter Kay's Phoenix Nights, leading to a resurgence in his popularity. The song was re-released on 14 March 2005 to raise money for the Comic Relief charity, and reached Number 1 in the UK Singles Chart (outselling all the first release's chart run put together). This led to the biggest sales for a Number 1 single for the whole year, with seven weeks at the chart pinnacle. It also became the longest running chart-topper since Cher's "Believe", almost seven years earlier. The single was credited as "featuring Peter Kay", though Kay only appeared in the video; the audio track was the original 1971 issue. His album The Definitive Collection also climbed to the Number 1 spot the following week in the UK Albums Chart, breaking records when it also came in at Number 1 on the downloads chart.

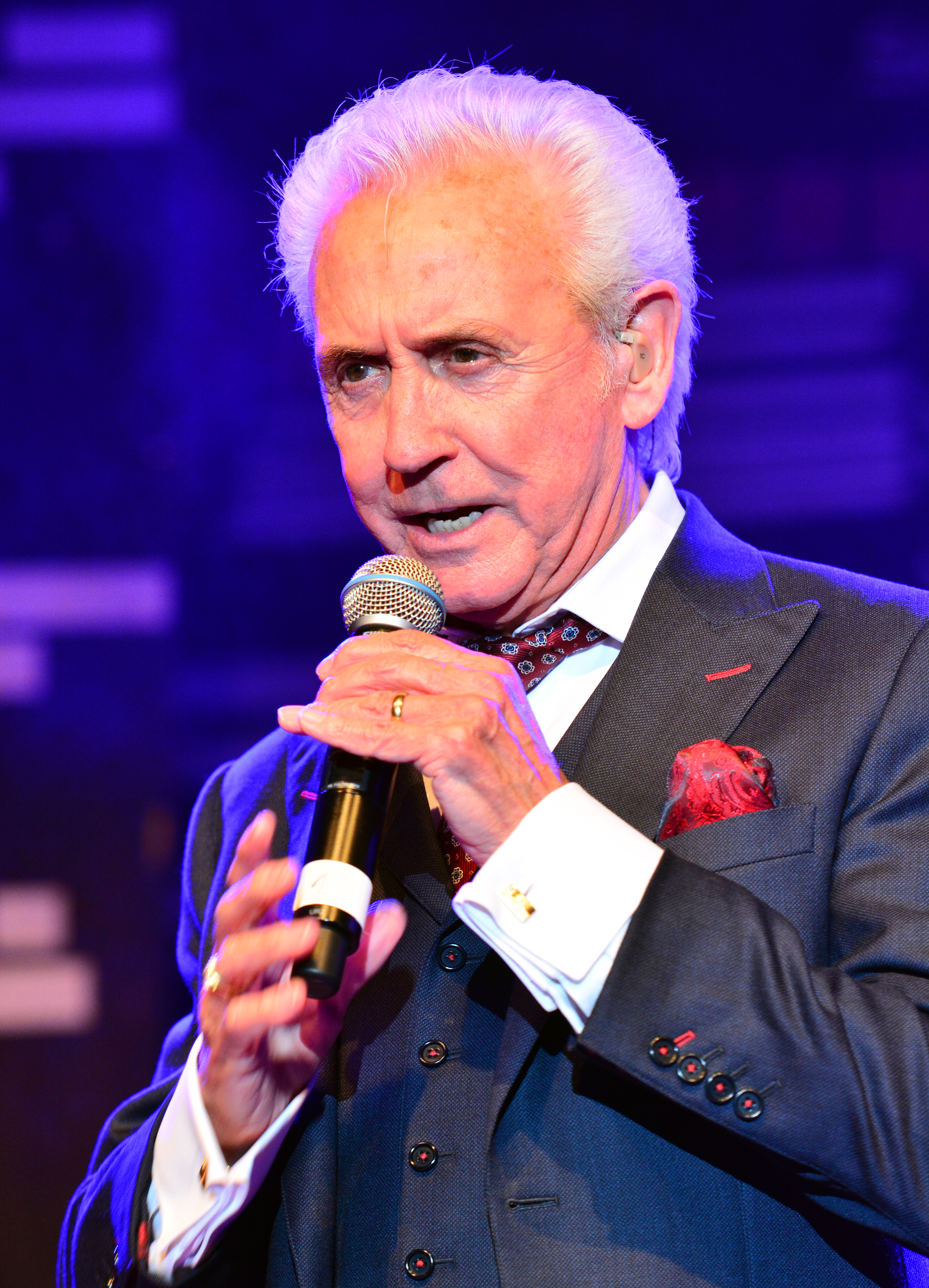
Christie in March 2015

In 2005, the Dutch singer Albert West covered the same song. This release reached Number 25 in the Dutch record chart. The same year Christie re-recorded "Amarillo" together with the Hermes House Band for the German market, reaching number 25 in the German charts and having several TV performances. Following the song's success, Christie was awarded the freedom of Amarillo, Texas, and made a guest appearance on the Yorkshire-based TV soap opera Emmerdale.

A few months later he re-released another single, "Avenues & Alleyways", as a follow-up to the success of "Amarillo". Although this only reached Number 26 on the UK Singles Chart, it once again out-performed the original release, which reached Number 37 in 1973. Following on from this success, Christie released a single on 5 December 2005, a big band cover of Slade's "Merry Xmas Everybody". The B-side contained a big band version of "(Is This the Way to) Amarillo" and a live recording of "If It Feels Good, Do It" plus videos of the first two tracks. However, it only reached Number 49 on the UK chart.

To coincide with the 2006 World Cup, a new version of "Amarillo" was released on the novelty single "(Is This the Way to) The World Cup" on 29 May 2006, reaching Number 8 in the UK. On 6 November 2006, Christie issued the album Simply in Love.

In 2008, Christie recorded the album Made in Sheffield, with production from Richard Hawley and contributions from Alex Turner and Jarvis Cocker. On 20 May 2008, he performed one of the album's songs, "Danger Is A Woman in Love", at the Royal Albert Hall with Hawley. 2009 saw the release of the download single "Every Word She Said". The same year, Christie also featured in "Heresy", with his nephew's band Laruso, which was released on their début album A Classic Case of Cause and Effect.

In July 2010, Christie made his West End début in the musical Dreamboats and Petticoats in London's Playhouse Theatre playing the roles of 'Older Bobby' and 'Phil'. On 22 December 2010, Christie appeared in a celebrity version of Come Dine with Me. Christie came joint second, with actress Susie Amy, behind winner Janet Ellis, but ahead of the musician and actor Goldie. The Channel 4 programme's prize of £1,000 went to charity.

=== 2011 to present ===
Having signed with the Acid Jazz label, it was announced that a Northern soul inspired album was to be released in January 2011. Christie's nineteenth studio album, Now's the Time!, was released in the UK on 7 February 2011 through Acid Jazz. Produced by Richard Barrett of All Seeing I, it included collaborations with Jarvis Cocker and Róisín Murphy. Martin Townsend of the Daily Express gave it a favourable review, saying it oozed wit and style. The song "Nobody in the World" which was released by Acid Jazz on a 45 RPM single the previous year appears on the album.

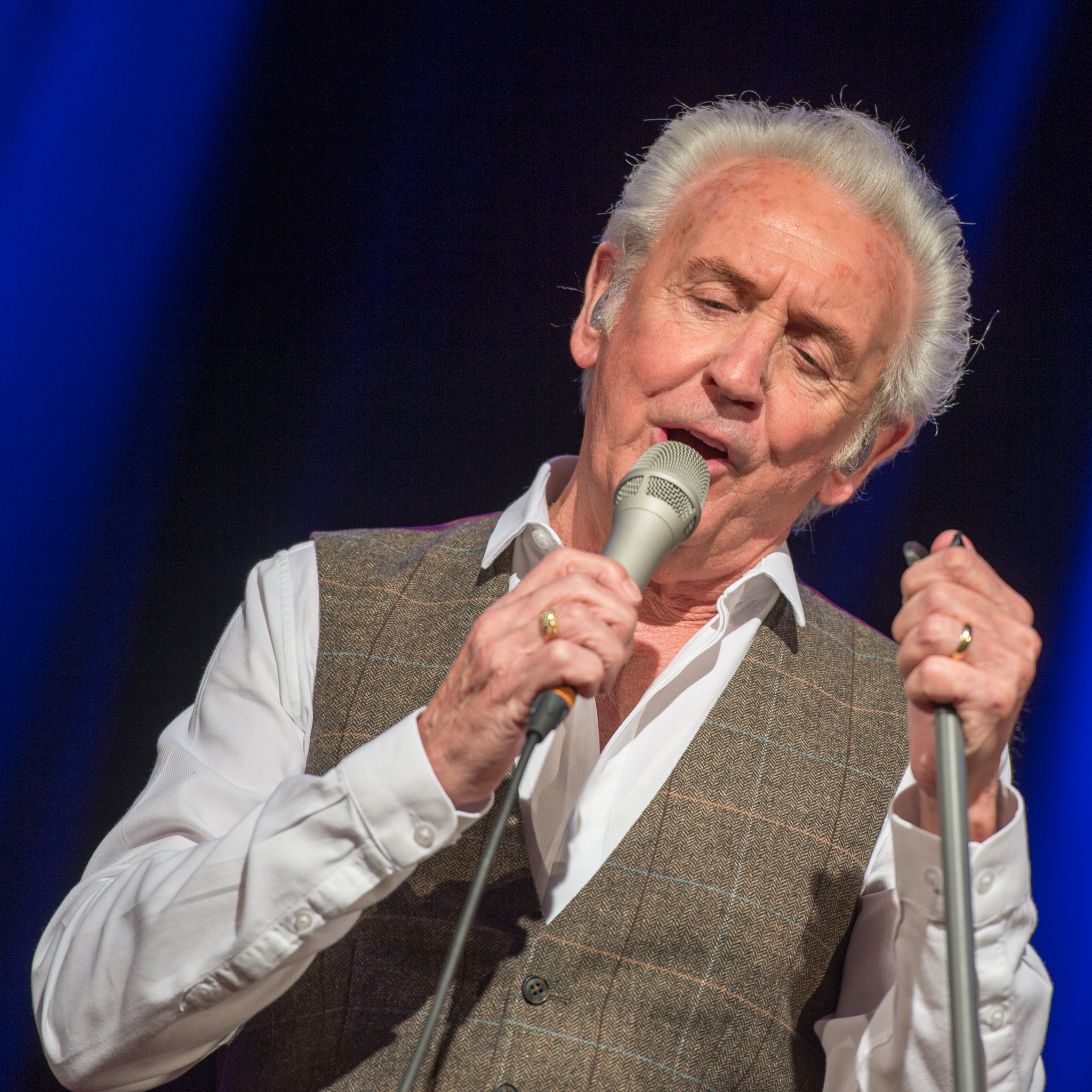
Christie in December 2016

To coincide with 50 years in the music industry, Christie embarked on a 50-date national tour promoting the new album. Over the course of the summer Christie travelled with his band across the country performing in all kinds of venues. The tour included his back catalogue of hits including "Avenues and Alleyways", "Las Vegas", and "Walk Like A Panther" and several tracks from the new Now's the Time! album. Included in the set list was a version of "Mr Bojangles" made famous by Sammy Davis Jr. and a cover of the Smokey Robinson hit "Shop Around".

On 23 October 2011, Christie released a charity single, a special arrangement of "Steal The Sun" in aid of the Help for Heroes Charity, supporting all of the British Forces fighting on the frontline in Afghanistan. The single was available for download only on iTunes, HMV and Amazon, with all proceeds going to the charity.

From December 2011, Christie appeared in pantomime at The Theatre Royal, Windsor, as the King.

In June 2014, Christie performed at Locke Park, Barnsley, as part of a "Live Picnic in the Park" music event, to raise money and awareness for Barnsley Hospice.

On 1 July 2017, Christie returned to his home village of Conisbrough, South Yorkshire, to be the headlining act at the Conisbrough Music Festival. Christie later appeared at the Cambridge Arts Theatre in the pantomime, Jack and the Beanstalk, which was set in the fictional town of 'Amarillo' and featured Christie as the King.

== Personal life ==
Christie married his wife Susan in 1968, they have 3 children. They currently reside in Lichfield, Staffordshire. In January 2023, Christie announced he had been diagnosed with dementia.
