= Las Vegas (Tony Christie song) =

Song performed by Tony Christie

Single by Tony Christie
- Released: 1971
- Recorded: 1970
- Genre: Pop
- Songwriter(s): Mitch Murray, Peter Callander

Official audio
- "Las Vegas" on YouTube

"Las Vegas" is a 1970 song written by Mitch Murray and Peter Callander, best known in the version recorded by Tony Christie, which became his first UK hit in January 1971. It peaked at No. 21 on the UK Singles Chart.

It has also been recorded by Roberto Blanco (1970) and Joe Dolan (1972), as well as in Danish by Poul Rudi with lyrics by Sejr Volmer-Sørensen (1973).
