= Freddie and the Dreamers discography =

- Studio albums: 13
- EPs: 8
- Soundtrack albums: 1
- Compilation albums: 12
- Singles: 23

This is the discography of English beat band Freddie and the Dreamers.

== Albums ==
=== Studio albums ===
Title	Album details	Peak chart positions	
Title	Album details	UK	US
Freddie and the Dreamers	Released: October 1963; Label: Columbia (UK)	4	—
You Were Mad for Me	Released: October 1964; Label: Columbia (UK)	—	—
Freddie & the Dreamers	Released: March 1965; Label: Mercury (US)	—	19
Do the Freddie	Released: August 1965; Label: Mercury (US)	—	85
Frantic Freddie	Released: October 1965; Label: Mercury (US)	—	—
Sing-Along Party	Released: November 1965; Label: Columbia (UK)	—	—
Fun Lovin' Freddie	Released: December 1965; Label: Mercury (US)	—	—
Freddie and the Dreamers in Disneyland	Released: October 1966; Label: Columbia (UK)	—	—
King Freddie & His Dreaming Knights	Released: November 1967; Label: Columbia (UK)	—	—
Oliver in the Overworld	Released: February 1970; Label: Starline (UK)	—	—
The New Freddie and the Dreamers	Released: 1976; Label: Army's Shack (UK)	—	—
Breaking Out	Released: 1978; Label: Army's Shack (UK)	—	—
Greatest Hits & Latest Bits	Released: 1983; Label: Army's Shack (UK)	—	—
"—" denotes releases that did not chart or were not released in that territory.

=== Soundtrack albums ===
Title	Album details
Seaside Swingers	Released: July 1965; Label: Mercury (US); Features two tracks by Freddie & the Dreamers

=== Compilation albums ===
Title	Album details	Peak chart positions
Title	Album details	US
I'm Telling You Now	Released: March 1965; Label: Tower (US); Split album with other artists	86
Three at the Top	Released: October 1965; Label: Tower (US); Split album with other artists	—
The Best of Freddie and the Dreamers	Released: December 1977; Label: EMI (UK)	—
The Collection	Released: 1990; Label: The Collection (UK)	—
The EP Collection	Released: 1990; Label: See for Miles (UK)	—
The Best of Freddie & the Dreamers – The Definitive Collection	Released: 2 June 1992; Label: EMI/Tower (US)	—
The Best of the EMI Years	Released: 22 June 1992; Label: EMI (UK)	—
Original Hits	Released: 1 September 1995; Label: Disky (Netherlands)	—
The Very Best of Freddie and the Dreamers	Released: 13 October 1997; Label: Music for Pleasure (UK)	—
Greatest Hits	Released: July 1998; Label: Music for Pleasure (UK)	—
A's B's & EP's	Released: 1 March 2004; Label: EMI Gold (UK)	—
The Ultimate Collection	Released: 13 March 2006; Label: EMI Gold (UK)	—
"—" denotes releases that did not chart or were not released in that territory.

== EPs ==
Title (Note: This is a list of EPs released in the UK. Various other EPs were released elsewhere.)	Details	Peak chart positions	
Title	Details	UK	AUS
If You Gotta Make a Fool of Somebody	Released: September 1963; Label: Columbia	8	—
Songs from the Film 'What a Crazy World'	Released: January 1964; Label: Columbia	15	—
You Were Made for Me	Released: March 1964; Label: Columbia	—	—
Over You	Released: May 1964; Label: Columbia	17	—
Freddie Sings 'Just for You'	Released: August 1964; Label: Columbia	—	—
Ready Freddie Go!	Released: 2 April 1965; Label: Columbia	—	—
Freddie and the Dreamers	Released: November 1965; Label: Columbia; Released in Australia as A Windmill in Old Amsterdam	—	28
Freddie and the Dreamers	Released: 21 October 1977; Label: EMI	—	—
"—" denotes releases that did not chart or were not released in that territory.

== Singles ==
Title (A-side, B-side) Both sides from same album except where indicated	Year	Peak chart positions									UK Album	US Album
Title (A-side, B-side) Both sides from same album except where indicated	Year	UK	AUS	BEL (WA)	CAN	FRA	IRE	NL	NZ	US	UK Album	US Album
"If You Gotta Make a Fool of Somebody" b/w "Feel So Blue"	1963	3	—	—	—	—	—	—	7	—	Freddie and the Dreamers Non-album track	Non-album single Do the Freddie
"I'm Telling You Now" b/w "What Have I Done to You?"	1963	2	—	—	1	—	—	—	6	1	Sing-Along Party Non-album tracks	I'm Telling You Now
"You Were Made for Me" b/w "Send a Letter to Me"	1963	3	—	—	23		10	—	4	21	Sing-Along Party Non-album tracks	Tree at the Top
"Over You" b/w "Come Back When You're Ready"	1964	13	96	—	—	—	—	—	—	—	Non-album singles	Do the Freddie Non-album track
"I Love You Baby" b/w "Don't Make Me Cry"	1964	16	—	—	—	—	—	9	—	—	Non-album singles	Non-album single
"Just for You" b/w "Don't Do That to Me"	1964	41	—	—	—	—	—	—	—	—	Non-album singles	Do the Freddie
"I Understand" b/w "I Will"	1964	5	74	—	4	—	—	— (Note: "I Understand" didn't enter the Dutch Single Top 10, but did peak at number 30 on the Dutch Top 40.)	—	36	Non-album singles	Freddie & the Dreamers Non-album track
"A Little You" b/w "Things I'd Like to Say"	1965	26	—	—	8	—	—	—	—	48	Non-album singles	Do the Freddie
"Do the Freddie" b/w "Tell Me When"	1965	—	55	—	6	—	—	—	—	18	Non-album single You Were Made for Me	Do the Freddie Freddie & the Dreamers
"Send a Letter to Me" (US-only release) b/w "There's Not One Thing" (by Just Four Men)	1965	—	—	—	—	—	—	—	—	123	Non-album singles	Three at the Top Non-album track
"Thou Shalt Not Steal" b/w "I Don't Know"	1965	44	—	—	—	—	—	—	—	—	Non-album singles	Fun Lovin' Freddie Non-album track
"A Windmill in Old Amsterdam" (US, Canada and Netherlands-only release) b/w "I Don't Know"	1965	—	—	—	27	—	—	—	—	—	Non-album singles	Frantic Freddie Non-album track
"If You've Got a Minute, Baby" b/w "When I'm Home with You"	1966	—	—	—	—	—	—	—	—	—	Non-album singles	Non-album singles
"Playboy" b/w "Some Day"	1966	—	—	—	—	—	—	—	—	—	Non-album singles	Non-album singles
"Short Shorts" (US-only release) b/w "Some Day"	1966	—	—	—	—	—	—	—	—	—	Non-album singles	Frantic Freddie Non-album track
"Turn Around" b/w "Funny Over You"	1966	—	—	—	—	—	—	—	—	—	Non-album singles	Non-album single Fun Lovin' Freddie
"Brown and Porters (Meat Exporters) Lorry" b/w "Little Brown Eyes"	1967	—	—	—	—	—	—	—	—	—	Non-album singles	Non-album singles
"Hello, Hello" b/w "All I Ever Want Is You"	1967	—	—	—	—	—	—	—	—	—	Non-album singles	Non-album singles
"Little Big Time" b/w "You Belong to Me" (Freddy Garrity solo)	1968	—	—	—	—	—	—	—	—	—	Non-album singles	Non-album singles
"Gabardine Mac" b/w "It's Great"	1968	—	—	—	—	—	—	—	—	—	Non-album singles	Non-album singles
"Get Around Downtown Girl" b/w "What to Do"	1969	—	—	—	—	—	—	—	—	—	Non-album singles	Non-album singles
"Susan's Tuba" (Note: "Susan's Tuba" features only Freddie Garrity with instrumentation augmented by members who would form 10cc, including co-writer Graham Gouldman.) b/w "She Needs Me" (Europe) / "You Hurt Me Girl" (UK)	1970	—	—	3	—	3	—	—	—	—	Non-album singles	Non-album singles
"Here We Go" b/w "I Saw You"	1978	—	—	—	—	—	—	—	—	—	Breaking Out	Non-album singles
"—" denotes releases that did not chart or were not released in that territory.
