= Rudy Clark =

American songwriter

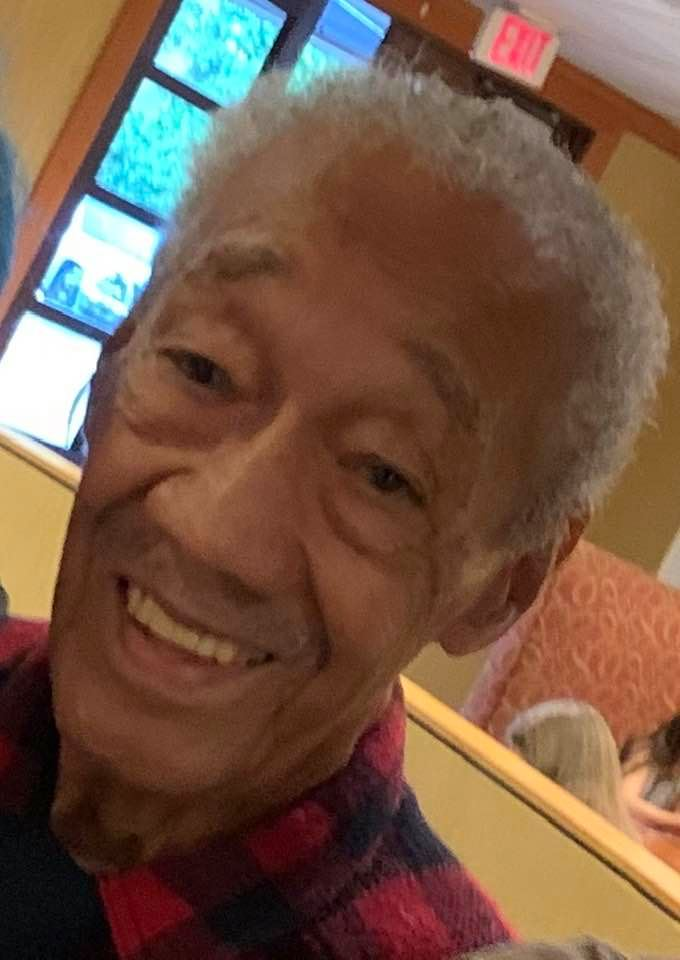

Background information
- Birth name: Rudolph Clark
- Born: October 29, 1935; New York, U.S.
- Died: September 3, 2020 (aged 84); Florida, U.S.
- Genres: Pop
- Occupation: Songwriter

Rudolph Clark (October 29, 1935 – September 3, 2020) was an American songwriter credited with hit songs such as "If You Gotta Make a Fool of Somebody", "Got My Mind Set on You", "The Shoop Shoop Song (It's in His Kiss)", and "Good Lovin' " (written with Artie Resnick). He was most active from the early 1960s through the early 1970s. He has more than 250 copyrights listed by BMI.

== Background ==
While working as a mailman in New York City in 1961, Clark wrote songs, and discovered singer James Ray in a small nightclub. Clark's songs won the interest of Gerry Granahan of Caprice Records, and Clark suggested that Ray record them. As a result, Ray recorded Clark's song "If You Gotta Make a Fool of Somebody", which became a pop and R&B hit in 1962 and was later a hit for Freddie and the Dreamers. Ray also recorded "Got My Mind Set on You", which became a No. 1 US and No. 2 UK hit for George Harrison in 1987, and was a No. 1 hit in 18 countries.

Clark was a close friend of singer Bobby Darin, who owned TM Music/Trio, the music company that employed Clark. Clark and Darin collaborated on several hits, including "Do the Monkey".

Clark wrote the Top 10 pop classic "It's in His Kiss (The Shoop Shoop Song)", first recorded by Merry Clayton and then by Betty Everett in 1964. The song was frequently revisited by other artists, most notably in the version that became a worldwide hit for Cher in 1991. With Arthur Resnick, Clark co-wrote "Good Lovin'", recorded by The Olympics in 1965 and then remade as a #1 hit by the Young Rascals the following year. Other Clark compositions include "Fool, Fool, Fool", recorded in 1964 by Little Joey & the Flips and then covered by Roosevelt Grier, the A-Cads, and Ray Brown & the Whispers, with the last two representations reaching #1 in South Africa and Australia respectively. His song "Waddle, Waddle" featured in the film Hairspray.

Clark composed "All Strung Out Over You" which was recorded by The Chambers Brothers, and was released on Columbia 4-43957 on December 19, 1966. It became a regional hit for the group, and by January 11, 1967, it was at #34 on the WMCA chart. The song was also covered by Spanish group, Los Crich who backed it with the Chambers Brothers song, "I Can't Stand It".

Clark was nominated for the Grammy Award for Best R&B Song for his lead contribution in writing the 1972 Top Five hit "Everybody Plays the Fool" by the Main Ingredient. Beyond pop hits, Clark wrote several songs for the early 1970s Harlem Globetrotters cartoon series.

Besides being heard on oldies radio, Clark's material has also found its way to the Broadway theatre, making reference to André DeShields' Haarlem Nocturne (1984) and Marion J. Caffey's Street Corner Symphony (1997).

== Chart hits written ==
Year	Song	Original artist	Co-writer(s) with Clark	US Pop	US R&B	UK	Other charting versions
1961	"If You Gotta Make a Fool of Somebody"	James Ray		22	10	—	1963: Freddie and the Dreamers, #3 UK; 1965: Maxine Brown, #63 US pop
1962	"Itty Bitty Pieces"	James Ray		41	—	—	
1962	"Got My Mind Set On You"	James Ray		—	—	—	1987: George Harrison, #1 US pop, #2 UK
1962	"Waddle, Waddle"	The Bracelets		113	—	—	
1963	"Do the Monkey"	King Curtis	Bobby Darin	92	—	—	
1963	"Shirl Girl"	Wayne Newton	Bobby Darin	58	—	—	
1963	"The Shoop Shoop Song (It's in His Kiss)"	Merry Clayton		—	—	—	1964: Betty Everett, #6 US pop, #1 R&B, #34 UK (1968); 1975: Linda Lewis, #107 US pop, #97 R&B. #6 UK; 1977: Kate Taylor, #49 US pop 1990: Cher, #33 US pop, #1 UK
1964	"Beg Me"	Chuck Jackson		45	5	—	
1964	"What Can a Man Do?"	Ben E. King		113	39	—	
1964	"Do It Right"	Brook Benton		67	33	—	
1965	"Why Don't You Let Yourself Go"	Mary Wells		107	—	—	
1965	"Good Lovin' "	The Olympics	Artie Resnick	81	—	—	1966: The Young Rascals, #1 US pop
1967	"You Can't Stand Alone"	Wilson Pickett		70	26	—	
1968	"A Woman With the Blues"	The Lamp Sisters		—	20	—	
1971	"You Shouldn't Have Set My Soul on Fire"	Inez Foxx		—	50	—	
1972	"Everybody Plays the Fool"	The Main Ingredient	J. R. Bailey, Ken Williams	3	2	52	1991: Aaron Neville, #8 US pop
1973	"After Hours"	J. R. Bailey	J. R. Bailey, Ken Williams	—	29	—	
1975	"Seven Lonely Nights"	The Four Tops	J. R. Bailey, Ken Williams	71	13	—	
"—" denotes releases that did not chart or were not released in that territory.
