= You Were Made for Me (Freddie and the Dreamers song) =

Single by Freddie and the Dreamers
- B-side: "Send a Letter to Me"
- Released: 1 November 1963
- Genre: Pop; rock; beat
- Length: 2:19
- Label: Columbia
- Songwriter: Mitch Murray
- Producer: John Burgess

Freddie and the Dreamers singles chronology
"I'm Telling You Now" (1963)	"You Were Made for Me" (1963)	"Over You" (1964)

"You Were Made for Me" is a song by the English band Freddie and the Dreamers, released as a single in November 1963. It peaked at number three on the UK Singles Chart.

== Release ==
"You Were Made for Me" was written by Mitch Murray, who had co-written the band's previous single "I'm Telling You Now" with Freddie Garrity. First released in the UK in November 1963 on EMI Columbia and then in the US in March 1964 on Capitol, it was released in the majority of territories with the B-side "Send a Letter to Me", which was solely written by Garrity. "Send a Letter to Me" would be later released as a split single in the US in 1965, whereupon it bubbled under the Billboard Hot 100.

"You Were Made for Me" and "Send a Letter to Me" were included on an EP released in the UK in March 1964 along with covers of Barrett Strong's "Money (That's What I Want)" and "Zip-a-Dee-Doo-Dah" from Disney's Song of the South. In the UK, "You Were Made for Me" was not included on an album upon its release, nor was it included on You Were Mad for Me, released the following year. However, it was included as part of a medley with "Tip Toe Through the Tulips" and "I'm Forever Blowing Bubbles" on the album Sing-Along Party in November 1965.

Upon its release, "You Were Made for Me" went to number three on the UK Singles Chart in the first week of December, spending four weeks at this position and a total of thirteen weeks on the chart. It was also a top-ten hit in Ireland and New Zealand where it peaked at number ten and number four, respectively. The song was one of three UK top-ten chart hits Freddie and the Dreamers had in 1963 along with "If You Gotta Make a Fool of Somebody" (also peaking at number three) and "I'm Telling You Now" (peaking at number two). The band had their fourth and final top-ten hit in 1964 with "I Understand", which peaked at number five.

Despite being released in the US and Canada in early 1964, "You Were Made for Me" was not a hit there until the following year after being re-released on Capitol's subsidiary label Tower. Two versions of the single were released in 1965 in the US. The first had the original B-side "Send a Letter to Me" and the second was a split single with "So Fine" by the Beat Merchants because Capitol only owned a few masters of Freddie and the Dreamers (the rest were owned by the band's subsequent US label Mercury). However, in Canada, "You Were Made for Me" was re-released with the band's cover of "Money (That's What I Want)" as the flipside. It went on to peak at number 21 on the Billboard Hot 100 and 23 on the RPM chart.

== Reception ==
Reviewed in Record Mirror, "You Were Made for Me" was described as starting "with a surprisingly high pitched opening passage. Then the song gets under way in a high-commercial fashion. The Dreamers fit in some interesting touches, vocally, and the Garritty [sic] voice fair throbs with enjoyment. Another one bound for a high chart placing". For Disc, Don Nicholl described the song as "a romancer in the deceptively simple fashion which this composer often succeeds in striking. And, as such, it should be every bit as commercial as previous hits... both for Freddie and The Dreamers and Mr. Murray".

== Charts ==
Chart (1963–64)	Peak position
Ireland (IRMA)	10
New Zealand (Lever Hit Parade)	4
UK Singles (Official Charts)	3

Chart (1965)	Peak position
Canada Top Singles (RPM)	23
Canada (CHUM)	31
US Billboard Hot 100	21
US Cash Box Top 100	17

== See also ==
- Freddie and the Dreamers discography
- List of UK top-ten singles in 1963
