= Alan Klein =

English singer-songwriter (born 1940)

- Born: Alan Charles Klein; 29 June 1940 (age 86); Clerkenwell, London, England
- Genre: Pop music
- Occupations: Singer-songwriter, musician
- Instruments: Guitar, vocals
- Years active: 1960s–present
- Labels: Decca, Parlophone, Oriole

Alan Charles Klein (born 29 June 1940) is an English singer-songwriter and musician. He wrote the soundtrack for the stage play and film, What a Crazy World (1963). In 1964, he released his only solo album, Well at Least It's British, that was re-released in 2008 by RPM Records.

Klein was born in Clerkenwell, London. Some of his recordings were made with the record producer, Joe Meek.

In 1966, he went on tour as lead vocalist of The New Vaudeville Band, billed as 'Tristam, Seventh Earl of Cricklewood'. A year earlier, Klein wrote and performed a parody of "Eve of Destruction", with an attack on folk-singers such as Donovan and Bob Dylan, entitled "Age of Corruption". It used the same melody as P. F. Sloan's song, and was released as a track on Klein's album Well at Least It's British, and as a single.

== Writing credits ==
- 1962 "What a Crazy World We're Living In" – Recorded by Joe Brown and the Bruvvers. Piccadilly 7N35024
- 1962 "My Very First Love" – Recorded by Ronnie Hall on Piccadilly 7N35040
- 1962 "A Lay-Abouts Lament" – Recorded by Joe Brown and the Bruvvers on Piccadilly 7N35047
- 1962 "At Times Like These" – Recorded by Ricky Valance on Columbia DB4787
- 1963 "Sally Ann" – Recorded by Freddie and the Dreamers on Columbia SEG8287 EP, and, by Joe Brown and the Bruvvers on Piccadilly 7N35138
- 1963 "Our Streets Annual Outing" – Recorded by The Bachelors on Decca LK4519 LP
- 1963 "Save Your Love for Me" – Recorded by Marty Wilde on Columbia DB7145
- 1963 "Come Back When You're Ready" – Co-written with J. Duncan, and recorded by Freddie and the Dreamers on Columbia DB7214
- 1964 "I'm a Dreamer" – Recorded by Donald Peers on Columbia DB7226
- 1964 "As Long As You Love Me a Little" – Recorded by Donald Peers on Columbia DB7299
- 1964 "Big Talk From a Little Man" – Recorded by Don Charles on His Master's Voice POP1332
- 1965 "I Would Give All" – Co-written with John McLeod, and recorded by The Harbour Lites on His Master's Voice POP1465
- 1965 "I'll See You Around" – Recorded by John Mantell on CBS201783
- 1965 "Big City" - Co-written with Jimmy Duncan, and recorded by Pretty Things on The Pretty Things on Fontana
- 1966 "I Just Can't Fool My Heart" – Recorded by Danny Storm on Piccadilly 7N35091
- 1966 "It Ain't Worth the Lonely Road Back" – Recorded by Pozo Seco Singers on Columbia (US) 4-43636
- 1966 "Little Ray of Sunshine" – Recorded by Joe Brown on Pye 7N17135

== Discography ==
=== Singles ===
- 1962 "Striped Purple Shirt" – Written and recorded by Klein on Oriole 45 CB1719 (A Side)
- 1962 "Three Coins in the Sewer" – Written and recorded by Klein on Oriole 45 CB1737 (A Side)
- 1962 "Danger Ahead" – Written by J. Francis and recorded by Klein on Oriole 45 CB1737 (B Side)
- 1965 "It Ain't Worth the Lonely Road Back" – Written and recorded by Klein on Parlophone R5292 (A Side)
- 1965 "I've Cried So Many Tears" – Written and recorded by Klein on Parlophone R5292 (B Side)
- 1965 "Age of Corruption" – Written and recorded by Klein on Parlophone R5370 (A Side)
- 1965 "I'm Counting On You" – Written and recorded by Klein on Parlophone R5370 (B Side)
- 1969 "Honey Pie" – Written by Lennon and McCartney, recorded by Klein on Page One POF119 (A Side)
- 1969 "You Turned a Nightmare into a Dream" – Written and recorded by Klein on Page One POPF119 (B Side)
- 1970 "Dinner's in the Ice Box" – Written and recorded by Klein on Decca F13033 (A Side)
- 1970 "Here I Am, There You Are" – Written and recorded by Klein on Decca F13033 (B Side)
- 1970 "Nothing Like a Long Gone Man" – Written and recorded by Klein on Decca F13091 (A Side)
- 1970 "Dreams of Youth" – Written and recorded by Klein on Decca F13091 (B Side)

"Honey Pie" / "You Turned a Nightmare into a Dream" was also released in the U.S., under the pseudonym "Earl of Cricklewood" (Page One 21,021; March 1969).

=== Albums ===
- 1964 Well at Least It's British – Written and recorded by Klein on Decca
