= Cuckoo Patrol =

1967 British film by Duncan Wood

- DVD (Renown Pictures, 2012)
- Directed by: Duncan Wood
- Screenplay by: Lew Schwarz
- Story by: Freddie and the Dreamers
- Produced by: Maurice J. Wilson
- Starring: Freddie Garrity; Victor Maddern
- Edited by: Tristam Cones
- Production company: Eternal Films
- Release date: 1967
- Running time: 72 minutes
- Country: United Kingdom
- Language: English

Cuckoo Patrol is a 1967 British musical comedy film directed by Duncan Wood and starring Freddie Garrity, Victor Maddern, John Le Mesurier and Kenneth Connor. The screenplay was by Lew Schwarz. It was produced in 1965 but held back for two years.

== Plot ==
A group of Boy Scouts get separated from Wick, their adult leader, on their way to a group meeting. A string of loosely-connected events ensue.

At first they are trapped in the back of a furniture lorry. When they eventually get out they are closer to their destination than they think, but thanks to poor map reading they head in the wrong direction.

A car passing loses a suitcase labelled "The Silver Supermen". This results in them taking the place of two wrestlers in a tag match and surprisingly winning.

Struggling to establish camp, they are helped by a group of girl guides and end singing around the campfire until their leader Brown Owl takes the girls off. Fearing punishment, they pack up camp and leave.

Their handcart is in the middle of the road and blocks the car of two bank robbers. In suggesting a diversion the car is wrecked and they offer to carry the men's gear on their cart. Soon after, they unknowingly help crack a safe at a sports good store. The gelignite owned by the burglars gets thrown around before one boy opens the safe with a karate chop. They realise that a real crime is being committed after the bank-robbers threaten them with a gun, and bombard the crooks with tennis balls before the police arrive.

The next morning they arrive safely at the group meeting on a tractor. The cart on the back blows up as the gelignite was still there. The boys laugh on the roof of the bus as Wick searches for them while holding a blade.

== Cast ==
- Freddie Garrity as himself
- Bernie Dwyer as himself
- Derek Quinn as himself
- Pete Birrell as himself
- Roy Crewdson as himself
- Kenneth Connor as Wick, scout leader
- John Le Mesurier as Gibbs, senior scout leader
- Victor Maddern as Dicko, bank robber
- Arthur Mullard as Yossle, bank robber
- Ernest Clark as Mr. Marshall
- Basil Dignam as Mr. Snodgrass
- Michael Brennan as Superman No.1
- Neil McCarthy as Superman No.2
- Peggy Ann Clifford as Brown Owl, Girl Guide leader
- Jack Lambert as police Inspector
- Patsy Snell as Girl Guide
- Cheryl Molyneaux as Girl Guide
- Georgina Patterson as Girl Guide
- Sandra Hampton as Girl Guide
- Carmel Dene as Girl Guide
- Vic Wise as Moley
- Jo Gibbons as Jo
- Lou Marco as referee
- Dominic Pye as black gorilla
- Bill Turney as black gorilla
- Roger Avon as policeman
- Victor Platt as van driver
- Dan Cornwall as van driver
- Anthony Buckingham as Owly
- John Ross as Jumbo

== Music ==
The film contains three songs: "The Cuckoo Patrol", "It Wasn't Me", and "Seems Like Things are Turning Out Fine Again", with music and lyrics by Frederick Garrity.

== Critical reception ==
Kine Weekly said "Kid's matinee stuff this, presented with a fresh and pleasing ingenuity and one or two songs."

Monthly Film Bulletin wrote: "A plotless and quite incredibly unfunny farce, with the further embarrassment of a team of grown men, Freddie and The Dreamers, impersonating moronic boy scouts."

The film's tag line, "Based on a story outline by Freddie and the Dreamers", was described by The Independent as "terrifying".

== Releases ==
The film was released on DVD in 2012 by Renown Pictures.
