= James Ray (singer) =

American singer (1941–1963)

Background information
- Also known as: Little Jimmy Ray
- Born: James Jay Raymond; 1941; Washington, D.C., U.S.
- Died: 1963 (aged 22) New York City, U.S.
- Genres: Rhythm and blues; soul
- Instrument: Vocals
- Years active: 1959–1963

James Ray (born James Jay Raymond, 1941 – c. May 1963) was an American R&B singer of the early 1960s best known for the hit single "If You Gotta Make a Fool of Somebody", which went to number 10 on the US Billboard R&B chart and number 22 on the Billboard Hot 100 in 1962. He also recorded the original version of "Got My Mind Set on You", later a number-one hit for George Harrison.

== Biography ==
Born in Washington, D.C., in 1941, an African-American, Ray attended McKinley High School. By 1959 he had relocated to New York City. He stood just 5' tall and first recorded as Little Jimmy Ray, releasing "Make Her Mine" on the Galliant label in 1959. It was unsuccessful and by 1961 he was destitute and living on a rooftop, though still performing in clubs. Songwriter Rudy Clark befriended him, and when Gerry Granahan of Caprice Records heard him rehearsing one of Clark's songs, signed him.

Using the name James Ray, his first recording was of Clark's song, "If You Gotta Make a Fool of Somebody", arranged by Hutch Davie. The record was a hit on both the pop and R&B charts. The single was issued in the UK in 1962 as well, and the song was performed by the Beatles before being discovered by Freddie and the Dreamers, who took it into the top 5 of the UK Singles Chart the year after. In the United States, Ray's single was followed in July 1962 by an eponymous album that contained the follow-up single "Itty Bitty Pieces", which reached No. 41 on the Billboard pop chart, as well as "Got My Mind Set on You", also written by Clark. An edited version was released later in the year as a single on the Dynamic Sound label.

The Caprice label folded in early 1963, and Ray was signed to the Congress label, a subsidiary of Kapp Records. The label released four singles by Ray, two written by Clark and all produced by Davie, but they were unsuccessful. Ray died from a drug overdose, probably in early 1963. In an interview published in 2020, Gerry Granahan recalled that he was asked to formally identify Ray's body when it was discovered, about ten months after his LP had been released.

== Covers and tributes ==
- The Beatles began performing "If You Gotta Make a Fool of Somebody" live after Paul McCartney heard it in one of the Nems record stores owned by Beatles manager Brian Epstein. McCartney was enthusiastic about it being an R&B number in waltz time, and Beatles biographer Mark Lewisohn called the record's sound – particularly the unusual combination of harmonica and tuba – "magical" in his book Tune In: The Beatles – All These Years, Vol. 1.
- George Harrison purchased a copy of Ray's album in 1963 when he went to the United States to visit his sister. Over two decades later, he revived "Got My Mind Set On You" and took it to number 1 in early 1988.
- John Lennon included "If You Gotta Make a Fool of Somebody" on a jukebox he owned in his home (the contents of which were issued as a double album in 2004 after the jukebox itself was purchased at an auction).
- In 1967 a cover of the song was released by Maxine Brown.
- Ronnie Wood, guitarist for Faces and The Rolling Stones, covered "If You Got to Make a Fool of Somebody" on his 1974 debut solo album, I've Got My Own Album to Do.

== Discography ==
=== Studio Albums ===
James Ray (1962)

=== Singles ===
Year	Title	Peak chart positions		Record Label	B-side	Album
Year	Title	US Pop	US R&B	Record Label	B-side	Album
1959	"You Need to Fall in Love"	—	—	Galliant	"Make Her Mine"	
1961	"If You Gotta Make a Fool of Somebody"	22	10	Caprice	"It’s Been a Drag"	James Ray
1962	"Itty Bitty Pieces"	41	—	Caprice	"You Remember the Face"	James Ray
1962	"A Miracle"	—	—	Caprice	"Things Are Gonna Be Different"	James Ray
1962	"Always"	—	—	Dynamic Sound	"I've Got My Mind Set on You"	
1963	"Marie"	—	—	Congress	"The Old Man and the Mule"	
1963	"Do the Monkey"	—	—	Congress	"Put Me in Your Diary"	
1963	"(I'm Afraid) The Masquerade Is Over"	—	—	Congress	"One by One"	
1964	"We Got a Thing Goin' On"	—	—	Congress	"On That Day"	
