= Gina Murray =

English actress and singer (born 1973)

- Born: Gina Elizabeth Murray; 6 November 1973 (age 52); Marylebone, London, England
- Occupations: Actress; singer
- Years active: 1994–present
- Television: Doctors; Witless; The Hunt for Raoul Moat
- Children: 2, including Max
- Parent(s): Mitch Murray; Grazina Frame
- Relatives: Mazz Murray (sister)

Gina Elizabeth Murray (born 6 November 1973) is an English actress and singer, known for her work on stage and screen. Her television credits include Doctors, Witless and The Hunt for Raoul Moat, whilst her theatre roles include Hairspray, Chicago and Mamma Mia!, as well as various other productions in West End theatre. She has also done voice work for several video games.

== Early life ==
Murray was born on 6 November 1973 in Marylebone, London, to songwriter Mitch Murray and actress Grazina Frame. She and her younger sister Mazz, also an actress, trained at Redroofs Theatre School. Murray has two sons, Joe and Max, the latter of whom portrays the role of Joel Marshall in the BBC soap opera EastEnders.

== Career ==
Murray's first credited role was in an episode of The Bill in 1994. Since then, Murray has appeared extensively in television and on stage. In 2010, she formed a girl group, Woman, with her sister Mazz alongside Anna-Jane Casey and Emma Kershaw, who released a single "I'm a Woman". In 2014, Murray appeared in an episode of the BBC soap opera EastEnders as Helen. Her stage credits include Mamma Mia, Chicago, The Full Monty and Fame.

Murray appeared in the BBC medical soap opera Doctors on two occasions, in 2016 and 2022 respectively. In 2023, she portrayed Lesley Stobbart in the ITV1 drama series The Hunt for Raoul Moat. In 2024, she portrayed Velma Von Tussle in the UK tour of Hairspray.

In 2025, Murray and her sister hosted the WhatsOnStage Awards. Murray has also had several voice acting roles, primarily in video games, including Rhodan: Myth of the Illochim (2008), Ankh: Battle of the Gods (2008), Lords of the Fallen (2014), Planet Coaster (2016), Baldur's Gate 3 (2023), RoboCop: Rogue City (2023) and Metaphor: ReFantazio (2024).

== Filmography ==
=== Television and film ===
Year	Title	Role	Notes
1994	The Bill	Kim	Episode: "Wall of Silence"
2000	Sorted	Jo	Film role
2005	Vegabond Shoes	1st Party Girl	Short film
2007	Judge John Deed	WPC Berry	2 episodes
2007	Alice in Wonderland: What's the Matter with Hatter?	—N/a	Voice role
2010	The Flirting Club	Kelly	Film role
2011	Flapacha, Où Es-Tu?	—N/a	Voice role
2014	EastEnders	Helen	1 episode
2016	Doctors	Isla Franklyn	Episode: "Ask Alice"
2017–2018	Witless	Shirley Whelan	Recurring role
2022	Mantis	—N/a	Short film
2022	Doctors	Myra Mallicoat	Episode: "Deck the Halls"
2023	Family Ties	Dolores	Short film
2023	The Hunt for Raoul Moat	Lesley Stobbart	Main role

=== Video games ===
Year	Title	Role
2008	Rhodan: Myth of the Illochim	Kari
2008	Ankh: Battle of the Gods	Isis
2016	Planet Coaster	Cynthia Clarke
2014	Lords of the Fallen	—N/a
2023	Baldur's Gate 3	Various
2023	RoboCop: Rogue City	—N/a
2024	Metaphor: ReFantazio	Various

== Stage ==
- Hairspray
- Mamma Mia
- Chicago
- The Full Monty
- Fame
- A Christmas Carol
- The Accrington Pals
- One Touch of Venus
- Fuddy Meers
