= The Pussycats =

Norwegian rock band (1964–1967)

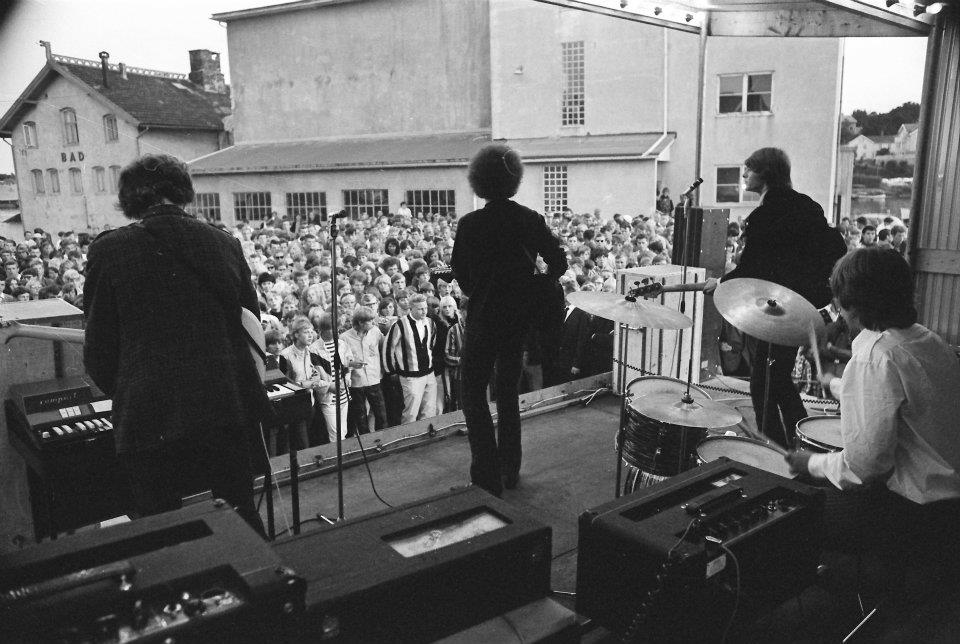
- Pussycats, Grimstad 1967

Background information
- Origin: Norway
- Genres: Pop
- Years active: 1964 - 1967
- Members: Sverre Kjelsberg; Trond Graff; Ottar Aasegg; Friedel Brandt; Ingemar Stjerndahl

The Pussycats were a Norwegian rock band from Tromsø. Their members from 1964 to 1967 were bassist and vocalist Sverre Kjelsberg, guitarist and vocalist Trond Graff, drummer Friedel Brandt, lead guitarist Ottar Aasegg, and keyboardist and vocalist Ingemar Stjerndahl. They had the Swede Sten Ekroth as manager. They published two albums, !!Psst !!Psst!! and !!Mrrr !Mrrr! in 1966.

== Final lineup ==
- Sverre Kjelsberg - bass, vocals (1963–1967)
- Trond Graff - guitar, vocals (1964–1967)
- Ottar Aasegg - guitar (1963–1967)
- Friedel Brandt - drums and percussion (1963–1967)
- Ingemar Stjerndahl - keyboards, vocals (1965–1967)

== Discography ==
=== Albums ===
- Psst|Psst|Psst (1964)
- Mrrr..Mrrr....Mrrr... (1965)
- Garman (as musicians for Ole Paus) (Karusell, 1972)
- Touch Wood (Polydor, 1973)
- Psst! Mrr... (MAI, 1981)
- The Pussycats Story (Polydor, 1982)
- To You (Polydor, 1991)

=== Singles ===
- "Ebb Tide" (1965)
- "Gonna Send You Back to Georgia" (1965 Timmy Shaw/Matthews)
- "Boom Boom"' (1965)
- "Let Me Stay with You" (1966, F. Brandt/T. Kjellsberg)
- "Just a Little Teardrop" (1966, Graff)
- "Why We Have to Wait" (1966, Graff)
- "Smile at Me" (1966)
- "The Craftsman" / "Song" (1967, Graff)
- "A Night of Life" (1967, Graff)
- "Vanja-Maria" / "Death Is Coming" (1967, Løseth)
