= I Think of You (1963 song) =

1963 song written by Peter Lee Stirling

"I Think of You" is a song written by Peter Lee Stirling and published in 1963. It was a hit for The Merseybeats in May 1964, reaching #5 on the British charts. Cash Box described the Merseybeats' version as "a pretty, soft-sounding cha cha beat sentimental thumper that the fellas carve out with loads of teen appeal." It was also a hit for Freddie & The Dreamers, released in October 1964, and was included on their 1964 album You Were Mad for Me.
