= You Were Mad for Me =

Studio album by Freddie and the Dreamers
- Released: 1964
- Recorded: 1964, England
- Genre: Rock
- Length: 30:43
- Label: EMI/Columbia

Professional ratings
Review scores
Source	Rating
Record Mirror	5/5 stars

You Were Mad for Me is the second album by the British group, Freddie and the Dreamers. The album was first released in 1964. This title should not be confused with "You Were Made for Me", a 1963 hit single that does not feature on the album.

== Track listing ==
Side one

1. "Jailer Bring Me Water" (Bobby Darin) – 2:20
2. "It Doesn't Matter Anymore" (Paul Anka) – 2:06
3. "Tell Me When" (Geoff Stephens, Les Reed) – 2:05
4. "Cut Across Shorty" (Marijohn Wilkin, Wayne Walker) – 2:18
5. "I'll Never Dance Again" (Barry Mann, Mike Anthony) – 2;20
6. "What'd I Say" (Ray Charles) – 3:09
7. "See You Later, Alligator" (Robert Guidry) – 2:22

Side two

1. "Early in the Morning" (Bobby Darin, Woody Harris) – 1:57
2. "I Think of You" (Peter Lee Stirling) 2:09
3. "Only You" (Ande Rand, Buck Ram) – 2:40
4. "Johnny B. Goode" (Chuck Berry) – 2:55
5. "I Don't Love You Anymore" (John Carter, Ken Lewis, Geoff Stephens) – 2:30
6. "Say It Isn't True" (Chad Stuart, Russell Alquist) – 1:53
7. "Write Me a Letter" (Peter Lee Stirling) – 1:59

== Personnel ==
- Freddie Garrity – vocals
- Derek Quinn – lead guitar
- Roy Crewdson – rhythm guitar and vocals
- Pete Birrell – bass guitar and vocals
- Bernie Dwyer – drums
