= Granahan =

Granahan is a surname. Notable people with the surname include:

- Gerry Granahan (1932–2022), American singer, songwriter, and record producer
- Kathryn E. Granahan (1894–1979), Democratic member of the U.S. House of Representatives from Pennsylvania
- William T. Granahan (1895–1956), Democratic politician from the U.S. state of Pennsylvania
