= I'm Telling You Now =

Single by Freddie and the Dreamers
- B-side: "What Have I Done to You?"
- Released: September 1963 (UK); March 1965 (US)
- Genre: Merseybeat ,Pop rock
- Length: 2:05
- Label: Columbia (EMI) DB 7086 (UK); Tower 125 (USA)
- Songwriters: Freddie Garrity, Mitch Murray
- Producer: John Burgess

Freddie and the Dreamers singles chronology
"If You Gotta Make a Fool of Somebody" (1963)	"I'm Telling You Now" (1963)	"You Were Made for Me" (1963)

"I'm Telling You Now" is a 1963 song by Freddie Garrity and Mitch Murray, originally performed by Freddie and the Dreamers, which, in 1965, reached number one on the American Billboard Hot 100.

"I'm Telling You Now" was first released in the United Kingdom in August 1963 on EMI's Columbia label and went to number two in the UK Singles Chart, becoming the band's biggest hit. Two years later, Capitol's subsidiary, Tower Records, re-released the song in the United States, which propelled Freddie and the Dreamers to international stardom.

The dancing by Freddie and the band during this song spawned (via video) a minor dance fad, the Freddie.

== Charts ==
=== Weekly charts ===
Chart (1963)	Peak position
UK	2

Chart (1965)	Peak position
Canada RPM Top Singles	1
US Billboard Hot 100	1
US Cash Box Top 100	1

=== Year-end charts ===
Chart (1963)	Rank
UK	40

Chart (1965)	Rank
US Billboard Hot 100	42
US Cash Box Top 100	48

== See also ==
- Hot 100 number-one hits of 1965 (United States)
