= Well at Least It's British =

Studio album by Alan Klein
- Released: 1964
- Studios: Decca Studios (West Hampstead, London)
- Genres: Music hall; pop; rock and roll; skiffle; folk
- Length: 28:03
- Label: Decca
- Producers: Hugh Mendl; Mike Vernon

Well at Least It's British is the only album by English musician Alan Klein, released by Decca Records in 1964. Produced by Hugh Mendl and Mike Vernon, the album is the product of Klein's dissatisfaction with the Americanization of British pop culture, in particular the prevalence of bands using blues-based idioms, such as his labelmates the Rolling Stones. Klein instead embraced British culture and wrote songs about contemporary England while utilising the country's musical traditions, chiefly music hall, with help from musicians such as Jimmy Page and Big Jim Sullivan. The record is sardonic and cynical, with the singer's pasquinade lyrics employing biting humour and delivered in a Cockney accent.

On release, Well at Least It's British received some critical attention but was a commercial failure, which has been partly attributed to it being deemed out of step with contemporary pop trends. However, the album proved highly influential in later years and is considered a cult record. It was an influence on the early work of David Bowie, who shared producers with Klein, and later, Damon Albarn of Blur cited it as a major musical and lyrical influence on Modern Life Is Rubbish (1993), which similarly rejected American musical trends. Through its influence on Blur, Klein's album has been described as a forerunner to Britpop. In 2008, Well at Least It's British was re-released by RPM Records, who added six bonus tracks.

== Background and recording ==
By the time he released Well at Least It's British, Klein was known as a cabaret performer and hit songwriter, in particular for "What a Crazy World" (1962), originally a hit for Joe Brown before forming the basis of a musical and film. As a musician, Klein formed an American-style rock and roll band with guitarist George Bellamy named the Al Kline Band, with whom he experienced live success when they held a summer residency at Butlin's in Skegness in 1960. However, Klein soon grew tired of playing Eddie Cochran and Chuck Berry songs and wanted to pursue a new direction. In 1962, Klein recorded two singles with producer Joe Meek – the satirical "Striped Purple Shirt" and "Three Coins in the Sewer" – but they proved unsuccessful, as did his 1963 film adaptation of Grab Me a Gondola. Klein instead turned his attention to the creation of Well at Least It's British.

Klein was signed to Decca Records by the label's A&R representative Hugh Mendl, and was represented by Kenneth Pitt. Klein disliked his Decca labelmates, the Rolling Stones, for celebrating American culture rather than British conventions, and in general objected to what the author Ira Morra described as "the excessive Americanization of British culture in the music of popular British bands". Klein conceived Well at Least It's British as a rejection of British groups' love of American blues music, instead embracing the culture of his native United Kingdom, penning songs about contemporary England while building on the country's musical traditions. Klein remarked, "it's no good using the American style, the thing to do is use music hall, English music." According to Morra, both the album and the singer's subsequent tenure with the New Vaudeville Band "offered an unambiguous manifestation of these nationalist enthusiasms." Klein later commented on the album: "It was my political statement. I even stood in a pile of rubbish on the cover just to ram the point over, but no one seemed to be listening." In 2008, he elaborated more fully:

"I was fed up with the Americanisation of society and in particular pop culture, the fact that in the early '60s all the British groups were content to cover US blues, R&B and rock'n'roll songs rather than capture what was going on outside their own front doors, in their own streets, under their own noses, in the accents they were born with. And if they were singing their own songs it was all 'i love you, you love me, everything is perfect, blah blah blah' balladeering. I thought, what happens if I only love you a little bit or I know I'm not going to live up to expectations and I'm going to let you down or I'm just not sure? What about real experience? Real life? So I set about documenting what I saw as the British condition on my own door step."

Well at Least It's British was recorded at Decca Studios in West Hampstead, London, with Mendl and Mike Vernon as producers. Klein, who himself contributes vocals, harmonica and ukulele, is backed on the record by guitarists Jimmy Page and Big Jim Sullivan and backing vocalists John Carter, Perry Ford and Ken Lewis. Terry Johnson acted as engineer.

== Composition ==
All twelve songs on Well at Least It's British are composed and performed by Klein. According to biographer Chris True, the album "[explores] British musical traditions as opposed to American-based blues and country". In particular, Klein uses the record to revive the music hall genre. As the critic Stephen Thomas Erlewine writes, the majority of the album is in a "frivolous, frilly pop" style derived in part from music hall traditions but also from the "light mainstream pop" still popular in the early years of Beatlemania, comparing it to some of Joe Meek's softer material. Lois Wilson writes that the music, boldened by Page and Sullivan's playing, eschews twelve-bar blues for an array of British traditional styles, such as music hall, skiffle, Lionel Bart-style show tunes and the music of George Formby, whereas the music writer Chris O'Leary calls it "a collection of blues, folk, Beat poetry, skiffle and rock & roll pastiches."

The record is sardonic and cynical, with songs such as "Birds and Bees" – about a boy asking his father about the birds and the bees – typical of its humour. Two songs, "Going to Bluesville" and "First Taste of the Blues", are parodies of the blues-based rock that Klein loathed, and exemplify the downtrodden melancholy contained within R&B lyrics, whereas other songs are uplifting ballads, including "Big Talk from a Little Man", "Word in a Song" and "I'm a Dreamer"; the celebrated "Twentieth Century Englishamn", however, is a wry dig at the chivalrous British gentleman archetype. Klein's pasquinade lyrics were inspired by the neorealist style and vulnerable masculinity portrayed in British New Wave films and the quaint humour of Peter Sellers and Ealing comedies, while his vocals are delivered in a Cockney accent reminiscent of Anthony Newley; as Klein later said, "Even singing in an English accent was radical at the time. I didn't want to sound phoney." Erlewine comments that, despite sounding like pre-Beatles rock and roll, the album is "quite modernistic" due to Klein's "exaggerated British accent" as well as his commitment to the album concept and his heavy use of mocking wit.

== Release and reception ==
Klein's only album, Well at Least It's British was released by Decca Records in Summer 1964, with the catalogue number LK 4621. The album was a commercial flop, which Wilson credits to it being "out of step with the musical climate" and for mocking other artists on Decca's roster; the label themselves did not enjoy the album, with Klein later remarking that Decca "only cared about The Rolling Stones". According to the critic Steve Rippon, the singer's distinctly English style "stood at odds with the transatlantic sounds dominating the British pop boom in 1964". True comments that, although the album did receive a "modicum of attention" on its 1964 release, it was not until later that Klein's work again become fashionable.

A reviewer for The Observer found that the best songs bare "a nice low-brow line in mockery", whereas the others are "as trite as the material the other half sends up." George Creegen of the Liverpool Daily Echo found the album difficult to classify, adding: "Somewhere between mirth, melody and moralising I should say, but if there is a message in this pleasant enough collection of songs I'm afraid it missed me." In a review titled "The Klein Talents", the Sunderland Echo noted Klein's cynical outlook on life and the humorous nature of the lyrics, but recommended that readers wanting a "more commercial" piece of Klein's work should seek out the musical soundtrack What a Crazy World, released through Pye Golden Guinea.

Morra comments that other musicians in the 1960s also began to use the music hall idiom to signify nostalgia for English tradition, such as with Herman's Hermits via songs like "Mrs. Brown, You've Got a Lovely Daughter" (1964) as well as Dave Davies' "Death of a Clown" and the Beatles' "When I'm Sixty Four" (both 1967). Morra remarks on that, along with Klein, these artists acknowledged the "ideological significance" of using music hall, and helped "recuperate and reinforce the informing national presence of this tradition within contemporary culture."

== Legacy and reappraisal ==
=== Influence ===
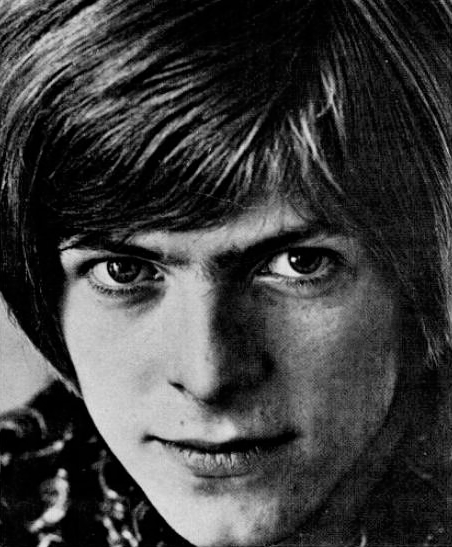
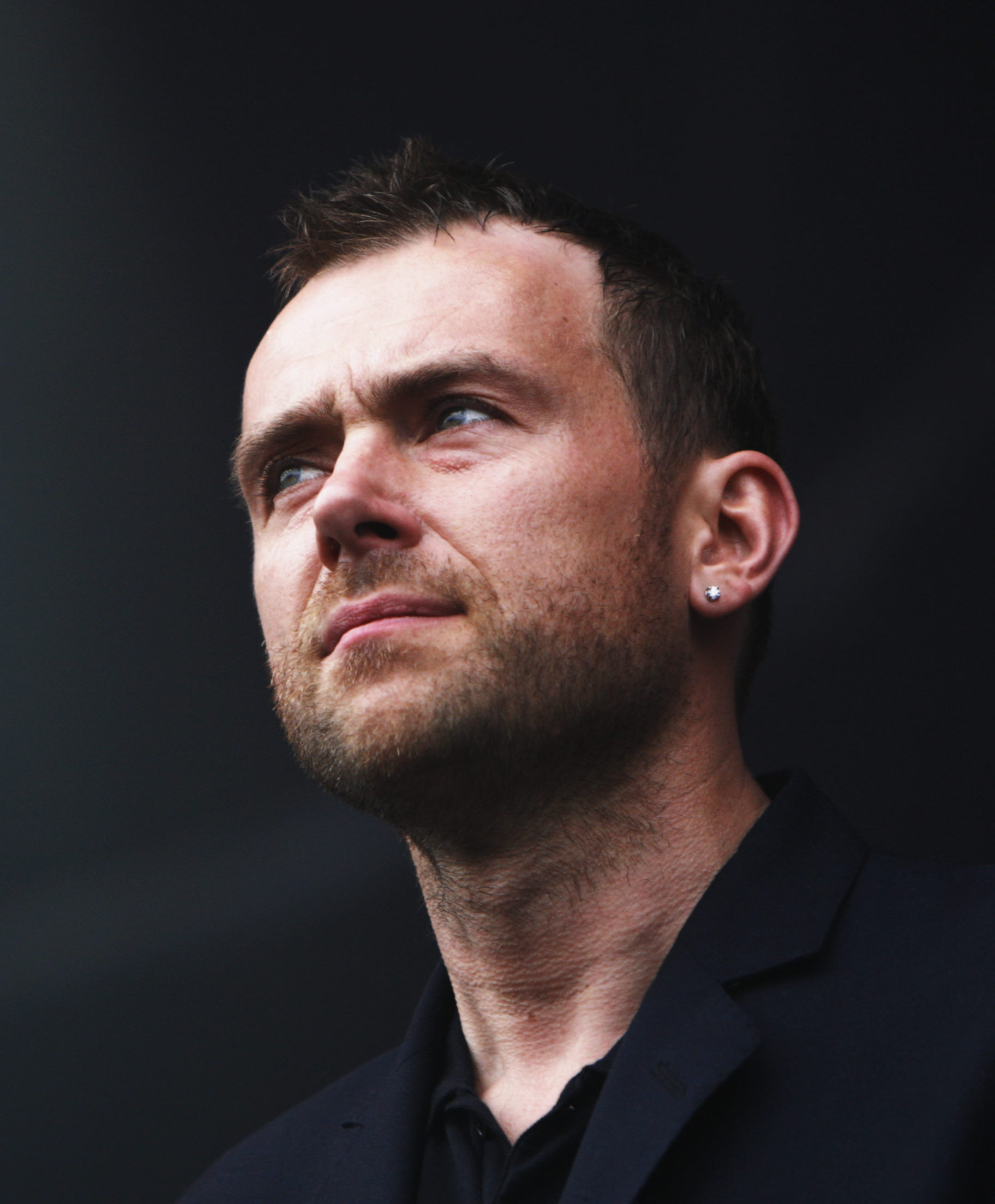
Artists influenced by Well at Least It's British include David Bowie (left, 1967) and Damon Albarn (right, 2007)

Well at Least It's British has since become regarded as an influential cult album. It pre-empted the psychedelic pop genre by revisiting the music hall era, and the satiric, Mockney tone of "I Wanna Be a Beatnik" and "Twentieth Century Englishman" observed English working class life in a similar manner to the songs of Ray Davies. The record was also a major influence on the early work of David Bowie. O'Leary calls it "the secret parent" of Bowie's eponymous 1967 debut album, which was similarly produced by Vernon; as with Klein, Bowie was signed to Decca by Mendl, represented by Pitt and produced by Vernon, and Klein's album has been described as the "common language" between the three men. As O'Leary describes, Pitt, Mendl and Vernon were brought together "to negotiate an album deal for Bowie and Decca", and likely had Well at Least It's British in mind "as to what they could do with Bowie's songs." (Note: The album has also been cited as an influence on Pete Townshend of the Who.)

Damon Albarn of Blur cited the album as a major musical and conceptual influence on their album Modern Life Is Rubbish (1993), after having found a copy in a charity shop around 1991. Albarn was inspired by Klein's celebration of England and rejection of American music, and critics have noted parallels between the two albums, with Modern Life Is Rubbish similarly rejecting the then-dominant American grunge style for songs about modern England built on the country's musical traditions. One song, "For Tomorrow", takes lyrical inspiration from Klein's "Twentieth Century Englishman". In an interview with Q, Albarn compared Klein to Lionel Bart and expressed surprise at Bowie and Ray Davies' relative unfamiliarity with Well at Least It's British, saying of the album: "[It is] a sort of pop music, but very strange. His lyrics appear very innocent, but at the same time, they have an embryo of cynicism which has been taken on board by everyone since." He also called it "a fantastic record [and] a very important link for me", believing it "pre-dated everything" and calling it "the most colloquial album I know".

Through its influence on Albarn, Well at Least It's British has been described as a major influence on Britpop, as Blur's album helped spark the movement, and its emphasis of "Britishness" was also shared by fellow Britpop band Pulp, securing the record's credentials. Despite also being cited as an influence on Blur's Parklife (1994), Klein's album was not reissued at this time. In 2008, Klein cited Albarn as the first artist who "seemed to be listening", but commented that "you can't turn on the radio now without some youngster pretending to be Cockney, it's all glottal stops, all dropped t's and clever songs about break-ups. Maybe Well at Least It's British made more impact than I thought." Mozart Estate frontman Lawrence calls Well at Least It's British a "classic album" that he is proud to own a rare vinyl copy of; in a 2018 interview with The Line of Best Fit, Lawrence chose "Twentieth Century Englishman" as one of his favourite songs, praising its chorus line, and said he identified with Klein because of his rejection of the blues revival in favour of music hall songs: "[He] was sick of twelve-bar blues, which I abhor, I can't bear it. I much prefer the tradition of music-hall into pop, not blues into pop." (Note: Lawrence also included "Twentieth Century Englishman" in his contribution to the Week-End Mixtape series on Mixcloud.)

=== Re-release and retrospective reviews ===
Professional ratings
Review scores
Source	Rating
Record Collector	3/5 stars

On 25 March 2008, Well at Least It's British was reissued on CD by RPM Records with six bonus tracks, and liner notes celebrating Klein for "marrying a satirically British music-hall sensibility to pop" and eventually inspiring Britpop. The bonus tracks include Klein's two singles produced by Meek as well as two further singles issued on Parlophone in 1965. Cherry Red Records reissued the album as a download on 6 April 2015.

In a review of the reissue for Record Collector, Steve Rippon noted the album's impact on Blur and Bowie, highlighting its "determinedly English style" and comparing the satiric outlook of several songs to Ray Davies, as well as praising several bonus tracks that he felt were "worthy of Vivian Stanshall." Reviewing it for Mojo's "Buried Treasure" column, Wilson described Well at Least It's British as "an assault on the American music hegemony" as well as a "trend-bucking view of the British condition." In 1995, the album was included in Q's "The Record That Changed My Life Chosen by 100 Stars".

In his review for AllMusic, Erelewine was less favourable, deeming it a curious cult record that, despite its influence, is no lost classic. He lamented that Klein's dislike of rock and roll, as exemplified with the two parodies of blues-based rock, was "jarring" next to the jolly pop that makes up the record, and noted that although the record's "theatricality and dogged eccentricity" impressed Damon Albarn, the album lacked great melodies and is "a conceptual album that's of note for its concept, not its execution", finally appraising it as "a piece of pop archeology" only worth momentary consideration.

== Track listing ==
Side one

1. "As Long as You Love Me a Little" – 1:47
2. "I Wanna Be a Beatnik" – 2:02
3. "Big Talk from a Little Man" – 2:13
4. "Word in a Song" – 2:08
5. "Going to Bluesville" – 3:05
6. "Will You Ever Come Back Again" – 2:54

Side two

1. "Twentieth Century Englishman" – 2:51
2. "I'm a Dreamer" – 2:12
3. "Birds and the Bees" – 1:52
4. "First Taste of the Blues" – 2:14
5. "Sea Shanty" – 1:55
6. "I'll See You Around" – 2:40

2008 bonus tracks

13. "It Ain't Worth the Lonely Road Back"
14. "I've Cried So Many Tears"
15. "Age of Corruption"
16. "I'm Counting on You"
17. "Striped Purple Shirt"
18. "You Gave Me the Blues"
19. "Three Coins in the Sewer"
20. "Danger Ahead"

== Personnel ==
Adapted from the liner notes of Well at Least It's British

- Alan Klein – writer
- Mark David – musical director
- Terry Johnson – engineer
- Michael Wale – liner notes
- A – mastering
- Hugh Mendl – producer
- Mike Vernon – producer
