= Set of Six (TV series) =

- Created by: Rowland Rivron and Ian Brown
- Directed by: Gerald Scarfe (episodes 1, 3 and 6) and John Stroud (episodes 2, 4 and 5)
- Starring: Rowland Rivron; Kathy Burke; Freddie Garrity; Michael Winner; Terry Booth; Lee Cornes; Peter Coles
- Music by: Steve Nieve
- Country of origin: United Kingdom
- Original language: English
- No. of series: 1
- No. of episodes: 6

Production
- Production company: Channel X

Original release
- Network: Channel 4
- Release: 12 June – 17 July 1990

Related
- The Last Resort

Set of Six is a British sketch comedy show, broadcast in 1990, starring Rowland Rivron as the Scrote sextuplets. The series follows each of the brothers in turn. The series was narrated by Tony Bilbow, and the music created by Steve Nieve. Rivron describes it as 'a spoof fly-on-the-wall sociological documentary looking at the way different environments affect people'.

The Scrote brothers were born out of a Rivron character, Dr Martin Scrote, who appeared on Jonathan Ross's The Last Resort. The idea for a series was drawn up on a napkin by Rivron and Ian Brown in the Gay Hussar, a Soho restaurant.

Three episodes were directed by the cartoonist Gerald Scarfe, and three by John Stroud.

== Episodes ==
No.	Title	Original release date	Prod. code
1	"Martin Scrote"	12 June 1990	TBA
Episode detailing the life of Dr Martin Scrote.
2	"David 'Top Shot' Scrote"	19 June 1990	TBA
Follows the life of photographer David Scrote, staff photographer for the Bexhill-on-Sea Observer. At the end of the episode Scrote reverses his car into that of Michael Winner who subsequently beats him up.
3	"Terry "The Tornado" Scrote"	26 June 1990	TBA
Episode follows the life of Terry 'The Tornado' Scrote, a would-be boxer, as he attempts to rise through the ranks of the boxing world. He lodges with 'Uncle Bertram' played by Terry Booth, a 'middle-aged man with a fondness for budgerigars and boys', and his manager is played by Lee Cornes. Rivron underwent extensive physical workouts with Bryan Lynch, trainer of Nigel Benn, in an effort to look and act like a boxer.
4	"Ronnie Scrote"	3 July 1990	TBA
Ronnie is a supergrass, and must stay anonymous. In order to do so he meets Peter Coles, head of the Harley Medical Group, and undergoes plastic surgery in an effort to disguise himself. He then enters the Witness Protection Scheme and is sent, much to his disgust, to Iceland, where his life begins to rapidly unravel.
5	"Giles Scrote"	10 July 1990	TBA
The episode follows Giles Scrote as he struggles to run an inherited farm.
6	"Tarquin Shirley Stanstead Scrote"	17 July 1990	TBA
This episode follows Tarquin Scrote, a tramp and former MP, on a journey to find a lost bank account. The episode includes a drunken sing-song with a female tramp, played by Kathy Burke, who serenades Tarquin with renditions of How Do You Do It? and You Were Made For Me by Freddie and the Dreamers. Freddie Garrity, lead singer of that band, is also in the episode. The episode ends with Tarquin dying in a fire after smoking a cigar at the same time as drinking surgical spirit.

== Production ==
The make-up was done by Dave Myers, better known as one half of The Hairy Bikers.

When shooting the David 'Top Shot' Scrote episode, Rivron met his wife-to-be who was working at The Groucho Club in London.
