= Don Charles =

English ballad singer, and record producer

- Also known as: Don Bennett
- Born: Walter Stanley Scuffham; 10 December 1933; Kingston upon Hull, East Yorkshire, England
- Died: 4 December 2005 (aged 71) Herstmonceux, East Sussex, England
- Genre: Pop music
- Occupations: Singer, record producer, writer
- Instrument: Vocals
- Years active: 1960s
- Labels: Parlophone, Decca, His Master's Voice

Don Charles (10 December 1933 – 4 December 2005) was a popular English ballad singer, and record producer, and later in his life, a writer of a self-help book. He is best known for his recordings of "Walk With Me My Angel" and "Bring Your Love to Me". He also produced several of The Tornados' tracks including "Space Walk" and "Goodbye Joe". The latter title referred his original mentor and producer, Joe Meek. Meek regarded Charles highly. "You are my only legit artist", Meek once informed Charles. "All the others are yugga-dugs". Standing at 6 feet 4 inches (1.93 m), and weighing around seventeen stone (108 kilograms, 238 pounds), Charles stood out in more ways than one from his fellow performers.

== Life and career ==
He was born Walter Stanley Scuffham in Kingston upon Hull, East Yorkshire, England. His father died when the youngster was aged four, and using his childhood nickname of Don he later adopted his stepfather's surname, becoming for a while Don Bennett.

He spent ten years in the Royal Navy, leaving at 25 years old with ambitions to become a professional singer. By 1960, after settling in London, he was signed to Parlophone by George Martin who produced his debut single, "Paintbox Lover". His stay with the label was short-lived, and he was signed by Joe Meek to Decca in 1961. He was renamed Don Charles to avoid potential confusion with Tony Bennett, and released his biggest seller "Walk With Me My Angel" in January 1962. Written by Geoff Goddard, and produced by Meek, the single just made the Top 40 in the UK Singles Chart. Not that he knew it at the time, but lack of further chart activity, would leave Charles with the one-hit wonder tag. He appeared on several teen based television programmes, and released a cover version of Ben E. King's B-side "The Hermit of Misty Mountain" in 1962, and the country music influenced novelty "It's My Way of Loving You" the same year.

Ill fortune followed when the BBC refused to play his 1963 follow-up "Angel of Love". This was because of the 'death song' styled lyric, "Everyone has an angel of love/Way up in the heavens above". This, combined with the all-pervading appearance of The Beatles, dealt a hammer blow to his career. The hastily released "Heart's Ice Cold" failed to find any buyers, and when Meek fell out with Decca, he took Charles with him to His Master's Voice.

Charles released seven singles for HMV between 1963 and 1966, which included "Tower Tall", "Big Talk from a Little Man" (written by Alan Klein) and "Dream on Little Dreamer", but commercial success continued to elude him. In 1965, Charles produced The Tornados' numbers, "Space Walk" and "Goodbye Joe". In an unusual move Charles returned to Parlophone in 1967, and released the Northern soul favourite, "Bring Your Love to Me", and several other unsuccessful singles. He then retired from the music industry, except for a brief return using a derivation of his birth name as Sgt. Will Scuffham, releasing in 1970 on MCA UK "And They All Came Marching Home" and "Lili Marleen". He had been encouraged to release a pseudo-military pop song after his friend Rolf Harris had a success with "Two Little Boys". At that time he also jointly bought a nightclub in Malta with Rolf Harris. When that venture fell flat, Charles became a used car salesman and, in 1989, he penned a successful book based upon his experiences, entitled How to Buy a Used Car (And Save Money).

Charles was an amateur photographer who undertook a large number of portraits of people local to the Primrose Hill area, where he lived in the 1960s and 1970s.

Four times married with five daughters, Charles died in December 2005, in Herstmonceux, East Sussex, less than a week away from his 72nd birthday.

He is not to be confused with another Don Charles, a Scandinavian-based record producer behind the musical recording project the Singing Dogs.

== Discography ==
=== Singles ===
Year	A-side	B-side	UK Singles Chart	Label / Catalogue reference
1961	"Paintbox Lover" †	"Teach Me Tonight" †	–	Parlophone R4811
1962	"Walk With Me My Angel"	"Crazy Man"	39	Decca F11424
1962	"The Hermit of Misty Mountain"	"Moonlight Rendezvous"	–	Decca F11464
1962	"It's My Way of Loving You"	"Guess That's the Way It Goes"	–	Decca F11528
1963	"Angel of Love"	"Lucky Star"	–	Decca F11602
1963	"Heart's Ice Cold"	"Daybreak"	–	Decca F11645
1963	"Tower Tall"	"Look Before You Love"	–	His Master's Voice POP 1271
1964	"Big Talk from a Little Man"	"She's Mine"	–	His Master's Voice POP 1332
1964	"If You Don't Know I Ain't Gonna Tell Ya"	"Voice on the Phone"	–	His Master's Voice POP 1307
1965	"Forgetting Me, Loving Him"	"A Long Time Ago"	–	His Master's Voice POP 1382
1965	"Dream on Little Dreamer"	"We Only Live Once"	–	His Master's Voice POP 1420
1965	"I Could Conquer The World"	"Time Will Tell"	–	His Master's Voice POP 1478
1966	"Out of This Cold"	"From The Beginning"	–	His Master's Voice POP 1542
1966	"And I'm Crying Again" ≈	"Time Will Tell" ≈	–	Columbia DB 7881
1967	"Bring Your Love to Me"	"So Let It Be"	–	Parlophone R5564
1967	"Have I Told You Lately"	"Time Waits For Nobody"	–	Parlophone R5596
1968	"If I Had The Chance"	"(I've Got Everything) I've Got You"	–	Parlophone R5659
1968	"The Drifter"	"Great To Be Livin'"	–	Parlophone R5688
1968	"Your Name is on My Heart"	"How Can I"	–	Parlophone R5712

† Billed as Don Bennett
≈ Billed as Don & Pete

=== EPs ===
Release date	Title	Label
June 1963	Don Charles	Decca

== Bibliography ==
- How to Buy a Used Car (And Save Money) (1989) – ISBN 1-872539-00-9
