= Mazz Murray =

English singer and actress (born 1974)

- Born: 26 November 1974 (age 51); London, England
- Occupations: Actress; singer
- Spouse: Oren Harush (m. 2009)
- Parent(s): Mitch Murray (father); Grazina Frame (mother)
- Relatives: Gina Murray (sister); Max Murray (nephew)
- Awards: Maltese European Song Festival - Best Vocalist

Marianne "Mazz" Murray (born 26 November 1974) is an English singer and actress with a three octave range.

As an actress she is best known for her theatre roles, including portrayals of Patsy Cline, Dusty Springfield and Vivian Ellis. She also gained popularity playing the role of Donna Sheridan in the stage musical Mamma Mia! from 2019 to 2025.

== Early life ==
Murray was born in London, and is the daughter of songwriter Mitch Murray and actress Grazina Frame. She trained at Redroofs Theatre School, Maidenhead, and Sylvia Young Theatre School in London.

== Career ==
Murray portrayed the Killer Queen in the West End production of the musical We Will Rock You. She is the longest-running cast member to be involved in the show, having been in the original ensemble when the musical opened in May 2002. She took over the principal role of Killer Queen from Sharon D. Clarke in April 2004.

In 2010, Murray formed a girl group, Woman, with her sister Gina, Anna-Jane Casey and Emma Kershaw, debuting with the single "I'm a Woman".

In 2015, she joined the cast of the London production of Mamma Mia! as Tanya, a role which was subsequently taken over by Kate Graham when Murray departed in 2017.

It was announced that she would join the cast of Chicago from 2 July 2018 until 11 August 2018, playing the role of Matron Mama Morton.

In 2019, it was announced that Murray would be returning to the West End production of Mamma Mia! in the role of Donna Sheridan. She played her final performance on 4 October 2025, after leading the West End production in the role for six years.

On 1 March 2026, she appeared as Queen Charlotte in the world premiere concert of Sea Witch at the Theatre Royal Drury Lane.

== Personal life ==
On 18 June 2009, she married Oren Harush (born 27 July 1980), an Israeli. Brian May played a special version of "Love of My Life", with some new words, with Murray at their wedding. The couple live in Bushey, Hertfordshire, England. They have two sons, Zac and Charlie, who are growing up bilingual in English and Hebrew.

She is a supporter of Manchester United F.C.

== Theatre credits ==
- We Will Rock You – Killer Queen
- Fame – Mabel
- Rent – Maureen
- Pippin – Berthe
- Boogie Nights – Debs
- Only the Lonely – Patsy Cline
- A Girl Called Dusty – Dusty Springfield
- Sweet Charity
- Fiddler on the Roof
- Chicago – Matron Mama Morton
- Mamma Mia! – Tanya and Donna Sheridan
- Sunset Boulevard – Norma Desmond
- Sea Witch - Queen Charlotte
- Love Never Dies — Madame Giry

== Television ==
- Blessed – Shop Assistant (1 episode: "Who Wrote the Book of Love?")
- Footballers' Wives – Jenny Taylor
- EastEnders – Miranda (2 episodes); Cleo (2 episodes)
- Fimbles – Yodelling Echo
- The Quest – Lizzie
- RuPaul's Drag Race UK – Guest judge (Series 7)
