= Grazina Frame =

British singer (born 1941)

- Born: Lydia Anna Grazina Obrycha; 6 November 1941 (age 83); Borough of Fylde, Lancashire, England, United Kingdom
- Other names: Grazina Obrychi; Grazina (recording name)
- Education: Aida Foster Theatre School
- Occupation(s): Singer, stage and screen actress, voice double
- Spouse: Mitch Murray (until 1980; divorced)
- Children: Mazz Murray; Gina Murray
- Relatives: Max Murray (grandson)

Grazina Frame (born Lydia Anna Grazina Obrycha; 6 November 1941) is an English stage and screen actress, singer and voice double.

== Early life ==
Grazina Frame was born as Lydia Anna Grazina Obrycha to Polish parents Zena Frame (mother) and Karol Jan Obrycki (father). She attended the Aida Foster Drama School and began her career as Grazina Obrycki.

== Television ==
She first appeared on television as a servant girl in A Time to be Born, a Christmas play, for BBC Television (broadcast 24 December 1953).

On television, she appeared as entertainer Gloria Marsh in the 19 October 1969 episode of Randall and Hopkirk (Deceased), "That's How Murder Snowballs", and in the series Up Pompeii! (1970), The Fenn Street Gang (1971), Doctor in Charge (1972) and The Morecambe and Wise Show as a regular from 1971 to 1974, playing supporting roles to the comedians. Her latest screen appearance was in the 1996 television movie Cuts.

== Stage ==
Frame appeared as Mavis, a Victorian mermaid, in Follow That Girl, from 1959 to 1960, at the Vaudeville Theatre, London.

She played Carol Blitztein in Blitz!, the 1962 West End musical by Lionel Bart.

She subsequently appeared in the 1986 London production of Cabaret with Wayne Sleep, Kelly Hunter, Peter Land, and Rodney Cottam.

== Music ==
Frame recorded a series of singles as Grazina on His Master's Voice from 1962 to 1964, and sang with Cliff Richard on several 1960s songs, as a result of having over-dubbed both Carole Gray in the film The Young Ones and Lauri Peters in Summer Holiday.

== Film ==
Her film appearances include The Painted Smile (1962), What a Crazy World (1963), The Bargee (1964), Every Day's a Holiday (1965) and The Alphabet Murders (1965).

== Personal life ==
She was married to songwriter and record producer Mitch Murray until 1980. Their daughters Mazz and Gina would form the girl group Woman. Frame subsequently remarried, to writer-producer Rob Dallas. She was a friend of Bob Monkhouse.

== Discography ==
=== As Grazina ===
- A: "Lover Please Believe Me" / B: "So What"
- A: "Another Like You" / B: "Don't Be Shy"
- A: "Be My Baby" / B: "I Ain't Gonna Knock On Your Door"
- A: "Stay Awhile" / B: "Let Me Go Lover"

=== With Cliff Richard ===
- "Nothing's Impossible" (Cliff Richard and Grazina Frame, A.B.S Orchestra) from The Young Ones
- "No One For Me" (Grazina Frame, A.B.S Orchestra) from The Young Ones
- "A Swinging Affair" (Grazina Frame, A.B.S. Orchestra) from Summer Holiday

== Television ==
- The Morecambe & Wise Show (5 episodes, 1971–74)
- Up Pompeii! (1 episode, 1970)
- "That's How Murder Snowballs", episode of Randall and Hopkirk (Deceased) (1969)
