= Max Murray (actor) =

English actor and singer (born 2007)

- Born: 2 August 2007 (age 19)
- Occupations: Actor; singer
- Years active: 2024–present
- Television: EastEnders
- Mother: Gina Murray
- Relatives: Mitch Murray (grandfather); Grazina Frame (grandmother); Mazz Murray (aunt)
- Musical career
- Instrument: Vocals
- Member of: The Murray BrotherZ

Max Murray (born 2 August 2007) is an English actor and singer, known for playing Joel Marshall in the BBC soap opera EastEnders.

== Early life ==
Murray was born in 2007. He is the son of actress and singer Gina Murray, and the grandson of singer Mitch Murray and actress Grazina Frame, whilst his aunt is the actress and singer Mazz Murray. He has an older brother Joe, with whom he formed a band, "The Murray BrotherZ"; they released a single, "Dear Amy", dedicated to singer Amy Winehouse, which was released in July 2024 on the anniversary of Winehouse's death.

== Career ==
In February 2025, it was announced that Murray would be joining the cast of the BBC soap opera EastEnders as Joel Marshall, the son of Ross Marshall (Alex Walkinshaw), who is introduced as the new partner of Vicki Fowler (Alice Haig), following her reintroduction after 21 years. Upon joining the show, Murray said it was an "absolute privilege and honour to be joining such a wonderful production full of a lovely cast and crew [...] adding that he was "really looking forward to introducing Joel to EastEnders viewers and telling [the character's] story."

Following the character's arrival in March 2025, it is subsequently revealed that Joel is responsible for debt owed by his father and the reason they were keen to emigrate from Australia. He subsequently establishes a friendship with Tommy Moon (Sonny Kendall) and develops an interest in Avani Nandra-Hart (Aaliyah James). In May 2025, it was announced that the character would feature in a new storyline highlighting the influence that social media and toxic friendships can have on impressionable teenagers, as well as the "consequences of such actions". In October 2025, it was announced that he would leave the role as his storyline reaches its conclusion. In April 2026, it was announced that Murray had resumed filming and Joel would return later in the summer.

== Filmography ==
=== Television ===
Title	Role	Notes
EastEnders	Joel Marshall	Regular role
EastEnders Investigates: The Manosphere	Himself	Documentary

== Discography ==
=== Singles ===
Title	Year	Album
"Dear Amy"	2024	Non-album single

== Awards and nominations ==
Year	Award	Category	Work	Result	Ref.
2026	TV Choice Awards	Best Soap Newcomer	EastEnders	Nominated	
