= John Lennon's jukebox =

Jukebox formerly owned by John Lennon

John Lennon's jukebox is a KB Discomatic jukebox made in the UK using a Swiss-made mechanism which Lennon bought in 1965. Lennon filled it with 40 singles to accompany him on tour. John Lennon's Jukebox also refers to the compilation CD album closely based on the jukebox's musical contents.

The jukebox surfaced in an auction of Beatles memorabilia at Christie's and was sold for £2,500 ($4,907) to Bristol-based music promoter John Midwinter. Midwinter spent several years restoring the box and researching the discs, which had been catalogued in Lennon's handwriting. As Midwinter's health began to deteriorate, he became anxious that a story of the jukebox and its music should feature in a documentary. Eventually, The South Bank Show broadcast a documentary on the jukebox in 2004 in which many of the represented artists, along with Sting, were interviewed. The project (which was commissioned only a few days after Midwinter died) was developed by Steve Day for the British television production company Initial, headed by Malcolm Gerrie, and commissioned by Melvyn Bragg.

== Album ==
The 2004 compilation album named John Lennon's Jukebox contains 34 of the singles' A-sides and seven of their B-sides. The album contains several songs that are believed to be part of John Lennon's original choice. The album is subtitled "a collection inspired by music from his own collection" and some of the songs on the album are different versions from the ones that could have been included in the jukebox. For instance, the version of "Some Other Guy" by The Big Three is not the one that was in the original jukebox; instead it is a mid-1970s recording by the same group in the style of the Richie Barrett original (including the use of an electric piano).

John Lennon's Jukebox

Compilation album by Various Artists
- Released: 8 March 2004
- Recorded: 1956–1966
- Label: Virgin Music

=== Disc one ===
1. "In the Midnight Hour" by Wilson Pickett
2. "Rescue Me" by Fontella Bass
3. "The Tracks of My Tears" by Smokey Robinson and the Miracles
4. "My Girl" by Otis Redding
5. "1-2-3" by Len Barry
6. "Hi-Heel Sneakers" by Tommy Tucker
7. "The Walk" by Jimmy McCracklin
8. "Gonna Send You Back to Georgia" by Timmy Shaw
9. "First I Look at the Purse" by The Contours
10. "New Orleans" by Gary U.S. Bonds
11. "Watch Your Step" by Bobby Parker
12. "Daddy Rollin' Stone" by Derek Martin
13. "Short Fat Fannie" by Larry Williams
14. "Long Tall Sally" by Little Richard
15. "Money (That's What I Want)" by Barrett Strong
16. "Hey! Baby" by Bruce Channel
17. "Positively 4th Street" by Bob Dylan
18. "Daydream" by The Lovin' Spoonful
19. "Turquoise" by Donovan
20. "Slippin' and Slidin'" by Buddy Holly

=== Disc two ===
1. "Be-Bop-A-Lula" by Gene Vincent
2. "No Particular Place to Go" by Chuck Berry
3. "Steppin' Out" by Paul Revere & the Raiders
4. "Do You Believe in Magic" by The Lovin' Spoonful
5. "Some Other Guy" by The Big Three*
6. "Twist and Shout" by The Isley Brothers
7. "She Said Yeah" by Larry Williams
8. "Brown Eyed Handsome Man" by Buddy Holly
9. "Slippin' and Slidin'" by Little Richard
10. "Quarter to Three" by Gary U.S. Bonds
11. "Ooh! My Soul" by Little Richard
12. "Woman Love" by Gene Vincent
13. "Shop Around" by The Miracles
14. "Bring It On Home to Me" by The Animals
15. "If You Gotta Make a Fool of Somebody" by James Ray with the Hutch Davie Orchestra
16. "What's So Good About Goodbye" by The Miracles
17. "Bad Boy" by Larry Williams
18. "Agent Double-O Soul" by Edwin Starr
19. "I've Been Good to You" by The Miracles
20. "Oh I Apologize" by Barrett Strong
21. "Who's Lovin' You" by The Miracles
