= Leave Me Alone (Let Me Cry) =

Single by Dicky Doo & the Don'ts
- B-side: "Wild Party"
- Released: 1958
- Genre: Rock and Roll
- Length: 2:13
- Label: Swan
- Songwriters: Marion Smith & Dicky Doo

Dicky Doo & the Don'ts singles chronology
"Nee Nee Na Na Na Na Nu Nu" (1958)	"Leave Me Alone (Let Me Cry)" (1958)	"Teardrops Will Fall" (1959)

"Leave Me Alone (Let Me Cry)" is a song released in 1958 by Dicky Doo & the Don'ts, a recording alias of Gerry Granahan. The song's melody is based on the Battle Hymn of the Republic. The song spent nine weeks on the Billboard Hot 100, reaching No. 44, while reaching No. 47 on the Cash Box Top 100, and No. 29 on Canada's CHUM Hit Parade.

== Chart performance ==
Chart (1958)	Peak position
US Billboard Hot 100	44
US Cash Box Top 100	47
Canada - CHUM Hit Parade	29
