= That's How Murder Snowballs =

- Randall and Hopkirk (Deceased) episode
- Episode no.: Season 1 Episode 5
- Directed by: Paul Dickson
- Written by: Ray Austin
- Production code: 05
- Original air date: 19 October 1969

Guest appearances
- Michael Griffiths; Arthur Brough; Grazina Frame; Stuart Hoyle; David Jason

Episode chronology
← Previous "Never Trust a Ghost"	Next → "Just for the Record"

"That's How Murder Snowballs" is the fifth episode of the 1969 ITC British television series Randall and Hopkirk (Deceased) starring Mike Pratt, Kenneth Cope and Annette Andre. Directed by Paul Dickson and written by Ray Austin, the episode was first broadcast on 19 October 1969 on ITV.

== Overview ==
In this episode themes of morality are raised when after Fernadez is murdered Jeff tips off a newspaper contact named Barry Jones who pays him well for story information. Jeannie on the other hand shows some moral compunction by questioning Jeff's ethics in selling a story. "Well, did you get your blood money?" she demands of Jeff.

We also learn that Jeff once paid Jeannie with a gold earring "in lieu of salary" again revealing his financial difficulties.

Jeff is hit many times in this episode. He is coshed over the head, shot at four times, nearly hit with a large sandbag and a thrown revolver, and worst of all is knocked out by a shelf tipped on him in the basement as he is searching for clues.

Meanwhile, in this episode Marty acquires a taste for dining at the finest restaurants, remarking that he had recently dined at the Savoy with the Prime Minister (at the time Harold Wilson).

== Cast ==
- Mike Pratt as Jeff Randall
- Kenneth Cope as Marty Hopkirk
- Annette Andre as Jeannie Hopkirk
- Robin Askwith as Call boy
- Simon Barnes as Man with Cards
- James Belchamber as Mark
- Harold Berens as Tony Lang
- Arthur Brough as Snowy
- John Cazabon as Doctor
- Grazina Frame as Gloria Marsh
- Michael Griffiths as Inspector Nelson
- Patrick Holt as Barry Jones
- Stuart Hoyle as Kim
- David Jason as Abel
- Valerie Leon as Kay
- Marie Makine as Old Lady (credited as Marie Makino)
- John Styles as Ventriloquist
- Tony Thawnton as Fernandez

== Production ==
Although the 5th episode in the series, That's How Murder Snowballs was the 11th episode to be shot, filmed between October and November 1968. The theatre used in this episode is the Palace Theatre, Watford, Herts. The music used for Gloria Marsh's song is lifted from The Saint episode Portrait of Brenda, first shown in February 1969.

Silent behind-the-scenes footage of this episode was included as an extra on the fourth-region 2 DVD. Shot by a second unit crew using stand-ins for the leads, the sequence runs to 1 minute, 6 seconds.

== See also ==
- 1969 in television
