= Every Day's a Holiday (1965 film) =

1965 British film by James Hill

- Theatrical release poster
- Directed by: James Hill
- Screenplay by: Anthony Marriott; Jeri Matos; James Hill
- Produced by: Maurice J. Wilson; Ronald J. Kahn
- Starring: John Leyton; Mike Sarne; Ron Moody; Grazina Frame; Freddie and the Dreamers
- Cinematography: Nicholas Roeg
- Edited by: Tristam Cones
- Music by: Tony Osborne
- Production company: Maycroft Pictures Limited
- Release date: 4 January 1965
- Running time: 110 minutes
- Country: United Kingdom
- Language: English

Every Day's a Holiday (US title Seaside Swingers) is a 1965 British musical comedy film directed by James Hill and starring John Leyton, Mike Sarne, Ron Moody, Grazina Frame, and Freddie and the Dreamers. The screenplay was by Anthony Marriott, Jeri Matos and James Hill.

== Plot ==
A group of teenagers take up jobs in a seaside resort for the summer.

== Cast ==
- John Leyton as Gerry Pullman
- Mike Sarne as The Hon. Timothy Gilpin
- Freddie and the Dreamers as The Chefs
- Freddie Garrity as Chef Freddie (as Freddie and the Dreamers)
- Derek Quinn as Chef Danny (as Freddie and the Dreamers)
- Roy Crewdson as Chef Gustav (as Freddie and the Dreamers)
- Pete Birrell as Chef Sigmund (as Freddie and the Dreamers)
- Bernie Dwyer as Chef Henri (as Freddie and the Dreamers)
- Ron Moody as Len Basto
- Liz Fraser as Miss Slightly
- Grazina Frame as Christina Barrington de Witt
- Nicholas Parsons as Julian Goddard
- Michael Ripper as Ernest Pulman
- Hazel Hughes as Mrs. Barrington de Witt
- Richard O'Sullivan as Jimmy Dainty
- Tony Daines as Mike
- Susan Baker as twin 1
- Jennifer Baker as twin 2
- Peter Gilmore as Kenneth
- Charles Lloyd-Pack as Mr. Close
- Patrick Newell as Mr. Hoskins
- Gaby Vargas as Anne
- Nicola Riley as little girl
- Marion Grimaldi as television vision mixer
- Coral Morphew as Serena
- The Mojos as themselves

== Production ==
It was filmed in and around Butlin's Clacton at Clacton-on-Sea.

== Music ==
- Freddie and the Dreamers – "What's Cooking"
- John Leyton, Mike Sarne and Grazina Frame – "Every Day's A Holiday"
- John Leyton – "All I Want Is You"
- Mike Sarne – "Love Me Please"
- The Baker Twins – "Romeo Jones"
- John Leyton and Grazina Frame – "A Boy Needs A Girl"
- Freddie and the Dreamers – "Don't Do That To Me"
- John Leyton, Mike Sarne, Grazina Frame, Susan Baker, Jennifer Baker, Richard O'Sullivan and Tony Daines – "Say You Do"
- Mike Sarne – "Indubitably Me"
- Grazina Frame – "Second Time Shy"
- John Leyton – "Crazy Horse Saloon"
- The Mojos – "Everything's Alright"

== Critical reception ==
The Monthly Film Bulletin wrote: "On the debit side are the near absence of plot, the heavy obviousness or leering suggestiveness of the humour, the over-acting of the older players in their trite roles, the embarrassing inability of many of the singers to dance more than a few easy steps, and the prolonged and irrelevant Wild West dream sequence. It is surprising, then, that this musical is quite attractive and entertaining. As co-author of the screenplay, James Hill may share in the responsibility for the film's failings, but as director he keeps it moving at a good pace, drops in some bright little visual jokes, sets up musical numbers unconventionally – for example during the camp toddlers' mass bath night – and quietly laughs at the real-life camp used as a background, notably during an amateur beauty contest. Nicolas Roeg's photography in Technicolor is a great strength, especially in the snappily edited final number. John Leyton has an engagingly melancholy personality, and in the other leading role Mike Sarne, as the languid Tim, is very funny. One is never sure, though, in the songs whether it is the film sending up the upper class Tim, or whether it is the pop lyrics that are being sent up by the cool Mr Sarne."

The Radio Times Guide to Films gave the film 2/5 stars, writing: "Director James Hill's attempt to take the Swinging Sixties to the seaside is often laughably bad. John Leyton is the nominal star of this talent-show farrago, although the musical headliners are Freddie and the Dreamers, who were trying to match the movie achievements of the Beatles in A Hard Day's Night. However, no film with cinematography by Nicolas Roeg can be dismissed out of hand, and Ron Moody and Liz Fraser provide accomplished comic support."

Variety wrote: "It is possible to get away without a story in a musical if the performers, songs and dancing are top league. But even then a crisp, strong story line helps. Every Day's A Holiday has an abysmally thin and trite yarn ... But peppy, enthusiastic young pop performers give the framework zest and a likeable, ingenuous sense of fun. ... The mediocrity of the acting is obvious, but it is outweighed by the genuinely infectious enthusiasm put into their jobs by the cast and some useful contributions by choreographer Gillian Lynne and composer Tony Osborne."
