= I Understand (Just How You Feel) =

Song by Pat Best

"I Understand (Just How You Feel)" is a popular song. It was written by Pat Best, and was published in 1953. Hit versions were initially recorded by the Four Tunes and by June Valli.

The recording by the Four Tunes was released by Jubilee Records as catalog number 5132. It first reached the Billboard Best Seller chart on May 19, 1954, and lasted 15 weeks on the chart, peaking at number eight. The recording by June Valli was released by RCA Victor Records as catalog number 20-5740. It first reached the Billboard Best Seller chart on June 2, 1954, and lasted 12 weeks on the chart, peaking at number 13.

== Later versions ==
"I Understand (Just How You Feel)"

Single by The G-Clefs
- B-side: "Little Girl I Love You"
- Released: September 1961
- Recorded: 1961
- Genre: Doo-wop
- Length: 2:40
- Label: Terrace

Later versions were recorded by:

- The G-Clefs – number 9 on the Billboard Hot 100 in 1961 and number 14 in Canada.
- Freddie and the Dreamers (number 36 on the Hot 100 in 1965, number 5 in the UK Singles Chart, number 4 in Canada) also charted. This version sold over one million copies globally.
- A version by the Bell Ringers was released on Bell Records, catalog number 1049. Reverse of the 45 rpm was "Joey" (written by Wiener, Kriegsmann, Bernstein).
