= The G-Clefs =

The G-Clefs were an American doo-wop/rhythm and blues vocal group, from Roxbury, Massachusetts, United States.

The G-Clefs consisted of four brothers and a fifth member who was a childhood friend. They first sang together at St Richard's Catholic Church, in their hometown of Roxbury. They were subsequently discovered by a talent scout named Jack Gold, who encouraged them to perform professionally. They began performing in greater Boston in the early 1950s. They scored two Top 40 hits in the United States: their version of "Ka-Ding-Dong" released in 1956 single, featuring Freddy Cannon on guitar, peaked at No. 24 on the Billboard Hot 100; it was the first national hit for their Boston-based label, Pilgrim Records. Their other hit song was 1961's "I Understand (Just How You Feel)", which used the melody from "Auld Lang Syne", reached No. 9. The latter track reached No. 17 in the UK Singles Chart in late 1961.

They continued to play locally in greater Boston, at the Strand Theater in Uphams Corner (Dorchester, Massachusetts), and throughout the area into the 2000s.

Ray Gipson died in 2015, at the age of 77. Tim Scott died in 2017, at the age of 78. Teddy Scott died in 2018, at the age of 82. Ilanga Scott died of cancer in 2022, at the age of 82. Chris Scott, the last surviving member of the group, died in Roxbury, Massachusetts on June 22, 2025, at the age of 88.

== Members ==
- Teddy Scott (born Bryce Theodore Scott; February 29, 1936 – October 27, 2018)
- Chris Scott (born Christian Rose Scott; February 14, 1937 – June 22, 2025)
- Tim Scott (born Timothy Scott; 1938 – May 16, 2017)
- Arnold (Ilanga) Scott (July 23, 1940 – December 24, 2022)
- Ray Gipson (born Ramon Gipson; September 24, 1937 – January 4, 2015)
- Ira Kweller - keyboard player (1952 – July 2018)
