= Freddie (dance) =

Type of dance

The Freddie was a very short-lived 1960s fad dance prompted by the release of the songs "I'm Telling You Now", and "Do the Freddie", both by the British band, Freddie and the Dreamers. "Do the Freddie" had been a number 18 hit in the United States in 1965, and American dance craze stalwart Chubby Checker had then made it to number 40 with the minor hit "Let's Do the Freddie" in that same year and number 15 in Canada Billboard said of Checker's version that there's a "new dance on the scene and Checker's got it! Exciting number done in his familiar style." Record World said that Checker "has a new terp idea that will also do big business."

To do the Freddie, the dancer simply stands in place; then, in rhythm with the music, extends the left leg and raises both arms, as if doing jumping jacks; then extends the right leg and raises both arms again. The moves are repeated until the song's conclusion.

== Popular culture ==
Although the dance never achieved lasting popularity, it was instantly recognizable. In a 1965 episode of The Addams Family ("Lurch, the Teenage Idol"), Gomez Addams (John Astin) does The Freddie enthusiastically in his living room. In 1989 "Do the Freddie" made a surprise comeback in the movie Troop Beverly Hills.

In 1987 another song called "Do the Freddy" was released, off the gimmick album Freddy's Greatest Hits. Complete with guest vocals by Robert Englund as slasher movie icon Freddy Krueger, the song also contained instructions on how to dance "The Freddy".

The Freddie is also mentioned in "The Frug", a song by the band Rilo Kiley (A reference made because the band's guitarist Jenny Lewis had starred in Troop Beverly Hills as a child). It appeared on both their debut album, The Initial Friend E.P., and on the soundtrack to the film Desert Blue.

The Adolescents also released a song in the 1980s entitled "Do the Freddy".

In The Simpsons episode "Duffless", Bart dreams of a "Go-Go Ray" with the ability to force teachers and administrators to perform various fad dances, including the Mashed Potato, the Jerk, and the Freddie.
