= Timmy Shaw =

- Born: Jake Hammond(s) Jr. September 13, 1938; Detroit, Michigan, United States
- Died: March 29, 1984 (aged 45) Detroit
- Genres: R&B, soul
- Occupation: Singer
- Years active: c.1960–1970s
- Labels: Hi-Q, Audrey, Reel, Jamie, Bon, Wand, Premium Stuff, Big Hit

Jake Hammonds (or Hammond) Jr. (September 13, 1938 – March 29 or 30, 1984), known as Timmy Shaw, was an American R&B singer who recorded in the 1960s.

He was born in Detroit. He first recorded in 1960 as Jay Hammond, with "I'll Be Your Fool" on the Hi-Q label, followed by "Hey Baby"/"Taste Of The Blues" on the Audrey label, owned by Detroit businesswoman and record producer Johnnie Mae Matthews. The following year he recorded "Throw It Out Of Your Mind"/"A Letter From My Baby" on the Reel label, and in 1962 recorded "Thunder In My Heart"/"No More" on the Bon label. The A-side is described by one reviewer as "extraordinary... one of the most sought after deep soul 45s." He worked closely with Johnnie Mae Matthews, sometimes performing with her as a duo.

Timmy Shaw's only chart record was "Gonna Send You Back To Georgia", which reached number 41 on the Billboard Hot 100 in early 1964. It was issued by Wand Records. Co-written by Hammonds and Matthews, the song was originally titled "A City Slick" and had first been released as the B-side of "I'm A Lonely Guy" on the Audrey label. His backing group is named on the label as the Sternphones. The song was covered by the Animals as "Gonna Send You Back to Walker"; Walker, Newcastle upon Tyne, was singer Eric Burdon's birthplace. John Lennon was also known to be an admirer of the Shaw recording; it was part of John Lennon's jukebox. However, the follow-up, "If I Catch You (Running Around)", failed to reach the charts. Later in the 1960s, Shaw recorded duets with both Little Melvin, "Get To Steppin'" (1967); and Chuck Holiday, "You Better (Get Yourself Together)" (1968). However, neither had commercial success.

Timmy Shaw died from throat cancer on March 29, 1984, at the age of 45.
