= Redroofs Theatre School =

Location
- 26 Bath Road; Maidenhead, Berkshire, SL6 4JT; England; 51.52215°N 0.73559°W

Information
- Type: Part-time theatre school
- Established: 1947
- Founder: June Rose (Keston-Bloom)
- Local authority: Windsor and Maidenhead
- Specialist: Performing arts
- Department for Education URN: 110167 Tables
- Head teacher: Samantha Keston
- Gender: Coeducational
- Age: 10 to 18
- Website: http://www.redroofs.co.uk

Redroofs Theatre School is a private part-time theatre training school in Maidenhead, Berkshire, England.

The school was established in 1947 in London and moved to Littlewick Green in 1964 into a house that was once the home of Ivor Novello. The school is based in Maidenhead. Redroofs is a part-time school of approximately 400 and an agency open to all pupils. In 2020 the school stopped its academic provision to become a larger part-time school for the performing arts only.

Former pupils include Kate Winslet, Mazz Murray, Joanne Froggatt, Kris Marshall, Dani Harmer and many other working industry performers, dance teachers, theatre producers, theatre directors, writers, stage managers, singers, dancers, stunt coordinators and actors.

== Former pupils ==
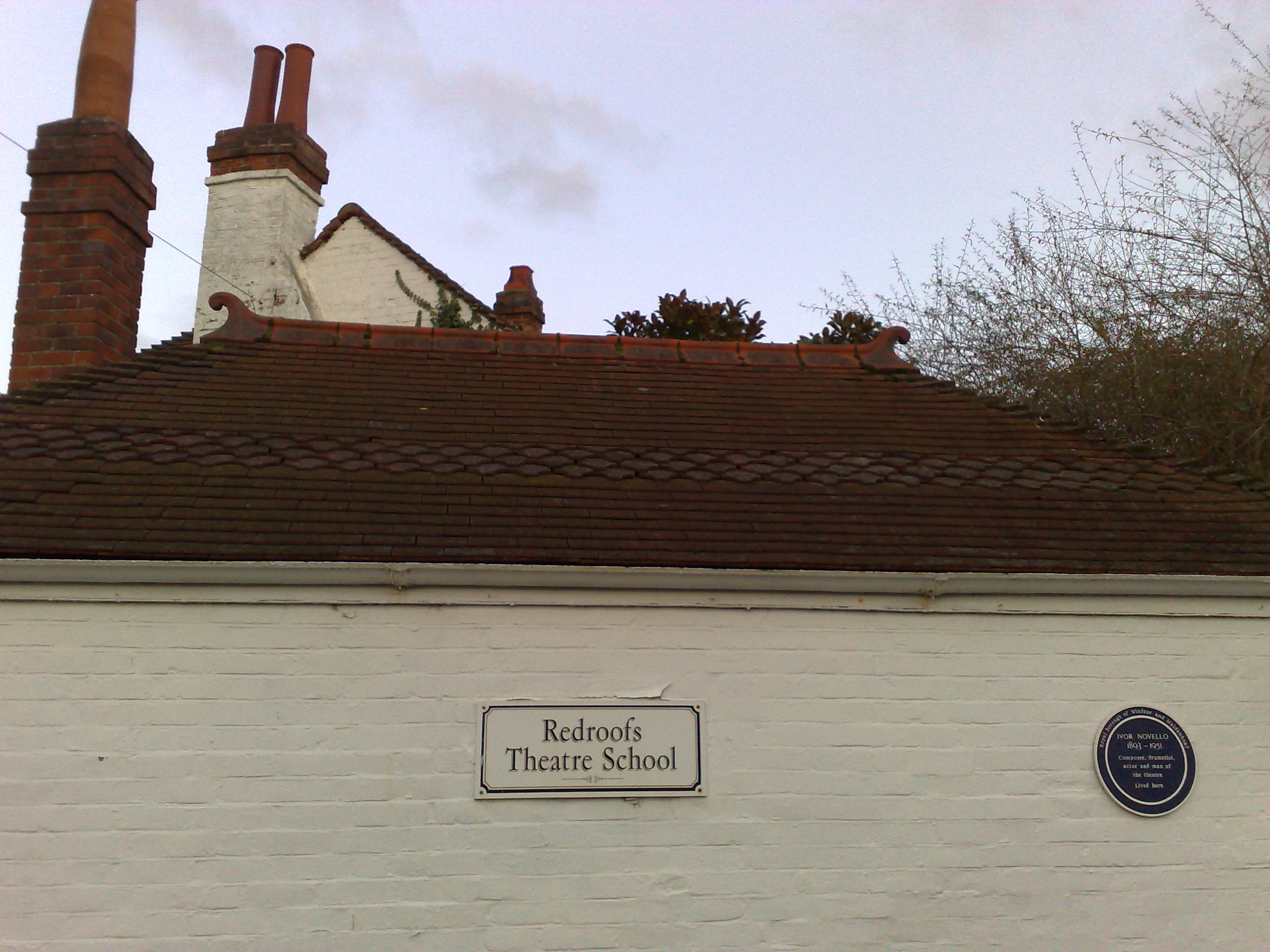
Redroofs Theatre School in 2009

Alumni include:

- Ali Bastian – actress
- Lucy Benjamin – actress
- Tara Bethan – actress
- Daniel Brocklebank – actor
- Matthew Cottle – actor
- Zara Dawson – actress/presenter
- Jessica Fox – actress
- Joanne Froggatt – actress
- Dani Harmer – actress
- Jessica Henwick – actress
- Kris Marshall – actor
- Ross McCall – actor
- Mazz Murray - singer and actress
- John O'Farrell – writer/broadcaster
- Richard Reid – actor
- Colin Teague – director
- Kate Winslet – actress
- Marcus D'Amico – actor
- Kerry Ingram – child actor, winner of Olivier Award for Matilda the Musical 2012
