= Gerry Granahan =

American singer (1932–2022)

- Born: Gerald Granahan; April 20, 1932; Pittston, Pennsylvania, U.S.
- Died: January 10, 2022 (aged 89) East Greenwich, Rhode Island, U.S.
- Genres: Rock and roll, pop, doo-wop, novelty
- Occupations: Singer, songwriter, record producer
- Instrument: Vocals

Gerald Granahan (April 20, 1932 – January 10, 2022) was an American singer, songwriter, and record producer, best known for his work in the 1950s and 1960s.

== Life and career ==
Granahan was born in Pittston, Pennsylvania on April 20, 1932. He worked at WPTS as a radio announcer and disc jockey in his youth. His Elvis Presley-like voice got him a job recording demos of songs submitted to Presley. Granahan was offered a contract with Atlantic Records in 1957 as a rockabilly artist under the name Jerry Grant, but his first record release sank without a trace, and another release shortly after on Mark Records was also a flop.

In 1958, Granahan teamed with publisher Tommy Volando on Sunbeam Records, and recorded the single "No Chemise Please". The song became a nationwide hit in the U.S., peaking at No. 23 on the Billboard "Top 100 Sides". None of his next four singles for Sunbeam, however, were successful.

Around this time, Granahan co-wrote the song "Click-Clack" with Dave Alldred of The Rhythm Orchids. A demo of the tune reached Dick Clark, as well as Tony Mammarella, who had just founded Swan Records. Because of contractual obligations, Granahan released the song under the alias Dickey Doo & the Don'ts on Swan, and Clark guaranteed it airplay on American Bandstand. "Click-Clack" reached No. 28 on the Billboard "Top 100 Sides", while reaching No. 8 on Billboard's chart of "Most Played R&B By Jockeys" and No. 14 on Billboard's chart of "R&B Best Sellers in Stores".

The single's success resulted in Granahan recruiting a backing band consisting of Harvey Davis (bass), Al Ways (sax), Ray Gangi (guitar), and Dave Alldred (drums) to tour and record as Dicky Doo & the Don'ts, who went on to chart several more singles. Dicky Doo & the Don'ts would see four more of their songs chart in 1958 and 1959. In 1958, "Nee Nee Na Na Na Na Nu Nu" reached No. 40 on the Billboard "Top 100 Sides", while its flipside "Flip Top Box" reached No. 61 on the Billboard "Top 100 Sides". Later that year, "Leave Me Alone (Let Me Cry)" reached No. 44 on the Billboard Hot 100. Their final charting single, "Teardrops Will Fall" reached No. 61 on the Billboard Hot 100 in 1959. In 1959, Granahan also managed a regional hit in the U.S. Northeast with the single "Let the Rumors Fly", released on Gone Records.

With Neal Galligan and arranger Hutch Davie, Granahan set up Caprice Records, and released singles in the early 1960s by the girl group The Angels, and James Ray, among others. Under his own name, he released a version of "Unchained Melody", which reached No. 9 on Billboard's "Bubbling Under the Hot 100".

Granahan also produced extensively. He recorded the doo wop group The Fireflies and the Angels, and later in the 1960s, Patty Duke and Jay & the Americans. Granahan produced The Wild Ones' version of the song "Wild Thing", which was dwarfed by the success of the version by The Troggs. He also produced the original recording of the song "If You Gotta Make a Fool of Somebody", as recorded by James Ray in 1961.

Later in his career, Granahan served as vice president of Dot Records and Paramount Records. He also performed as Dicky Doo and the Don'ts featuring Gerry Granahan. Granahan lived in Rhode Island from the early 1960s, and was inducted into the Rhode Island Music Hall of Fame in 2012. His two daughters Tara Granahan and Gerrianne Genga are both in the Rhode Island entertainment industry - Tara is a radio personality on WPRO-AM in Providence and Gerrianne is an actress and theater choreographer.

Granahan died at his home in East Greenwich, Rhode Island, on January 10, 2022, at the age of 89.

== Discography ==
=== Dicky Doo & The Don'ts ===
- Teen Scene (1960), United Artists: UAS 6097
