= What a Crazy World =

1963 British film by Michael Carreras

- Theatrical release quad poster
- Directed by: Michael Carreras
- Written by: Alan Klein
- Edited by: Max Benedict
- Production company: Capricorn [Michael Carreras Productions]
- Distributed by: Warner-Pathé Distributors
- Release date: December 5, 1963
- Running time: 88 minutes
- Country: United Kingdom
- Language: English
- Budget: £9,000 or £121,191

What a Crazy World is a 1963 film directed by Michael Carreras, co-written by Carreras and Alan Klein and based on the latter's stage play. The pop musical features various late 1950s and early 1960s musical performers such as Joe Brown, Marty Wilde, and Susan Maughan, and also includes an appearance by Freddie and the Dreamers, with Klein playing a minor role as a comrade of Brown's and Wilde's characters. Michael Ripper appears in several cameo roles as a "common man" bemoaning the "bleeding kids" he encounters.

== Plot ==
Unemployed East End working class lad Alf Hitchens spends his life in dance halls, amusement arcades and cafés to escape from the recrimination and self-preoccupation of the members of his family: his parents Sam and Mary, his older sister Doris, and his younger brother Joey. He oscillates between the influence of his best friend, anarchic layabout Herbie Shadbolt, and his girlfriend Marilyn Bishop, with whom he has an on-off relationship. One night, he casually composes a song on his banjo that describes the many problems in his personal life. All his efforts to get it published on Denmark Street and sell it fail until he encounters the secretary working for Doris' boyfriend Solly Gold, who runs a somewhat shady, low-rent entertainment office. Via the secretary's connections, Alf is eventually hired as a sheet music delivery messenger for Solly's publishing business, which encourages his self-respect and a latent sense of responsibility. Alf eventually donates a copy of his song to Solly, who plays the track and eventually decides to finally publish it; Solly's promotional efforts turn Alf's composition into an immediate success, delighting everyone (including Alf) except the members of Alf's family, who remain completely indifferent.

== Cast ==
- Joe Brown as Alfred "Alf" Hitchens
- Susan Maughan as Marilyn Bishop
- Marty Wilde as Herbert "Herbie" Shadbolt
- Harry H. Corbett as Samuel "Sam" Hitchens, Alf's father
- Avis Bunnage as Mary Hitchens, Alf's mother
- Michael Ripper as Common Man
- Grazina Frame as Doris Hitchens, Alf's sister
- Monte Landis as Solomon "Solly" Gold, Doris' boyfriend
- Michael Goodman as Joseph "Joey" Hitchens, Alf's brother
- Jessie Robins as fat woman
- Freddie and the Dreamers as Frantic Freddie and The Dreamers
- Fanny Carby as Dolly
- Larry Dann as Chas
- Brian Cronin as Harry
- Barry Bethel as Dave
- David Nott as Lenny
- Alan Klein as Jervis

== Reception ==
=== Box Office ===
Kinematograph Weekly called the film a "money maker" at the British box office for 1964.

=== Critical reception ===
The Monthly Film Bulletin wrote: "The British 'New Wave' rides again, with Michael Carreras clambering incongruously on to the Joan Littlewood band-wagon in this would-be "musical with a difference", which turns out to be merely an amalgam of pop music, "Cockney sparrer" and teenage clichés. East End locations, Otto Heller's skill with a camera, an intermittent crude zest and a few amusing moments cannot compensate for the repetitive banality of the dialogue, the paucity of wit, the dullness of the musical numbers, and the tedium of the romantic interest. The direction is coarse and without flair, the performances are mostly indifferent (except for Marty Wilde's effectively loutish Herbie), and in general this is a tasteless and charmless entertainment, though it might just possibly appeal to those 'bleedin' kids' so constantly apostrophised throughout the film."

Leslie Halliwell said: "Unsurprising star musical, quite lively of its kind."

The Radio Times Guide to Films gave the film 2/5 stars, writing: "With Tommy Steele and Cliff Richard making movies, it was only a matter of time before Joe Brown would have a go. The result is an amiable but outdated musical that is still worth catching to see Brown and the Bruvvers, Freddie and the Dreamers, Susan Maughan and Marty Wilde at the height of their powers. The longueurs between the musical numbers, which the more generous might call the plot, are distinctly dodgy."

== Releases ==
The film was released on DVD in the UK by Network Video July 2014 with the original theatrical trailer. In 2020 Network released a Blu-ray in the UK
