= Maxine Brown (soul singer) =

American soul and R&B singer (born 1939)

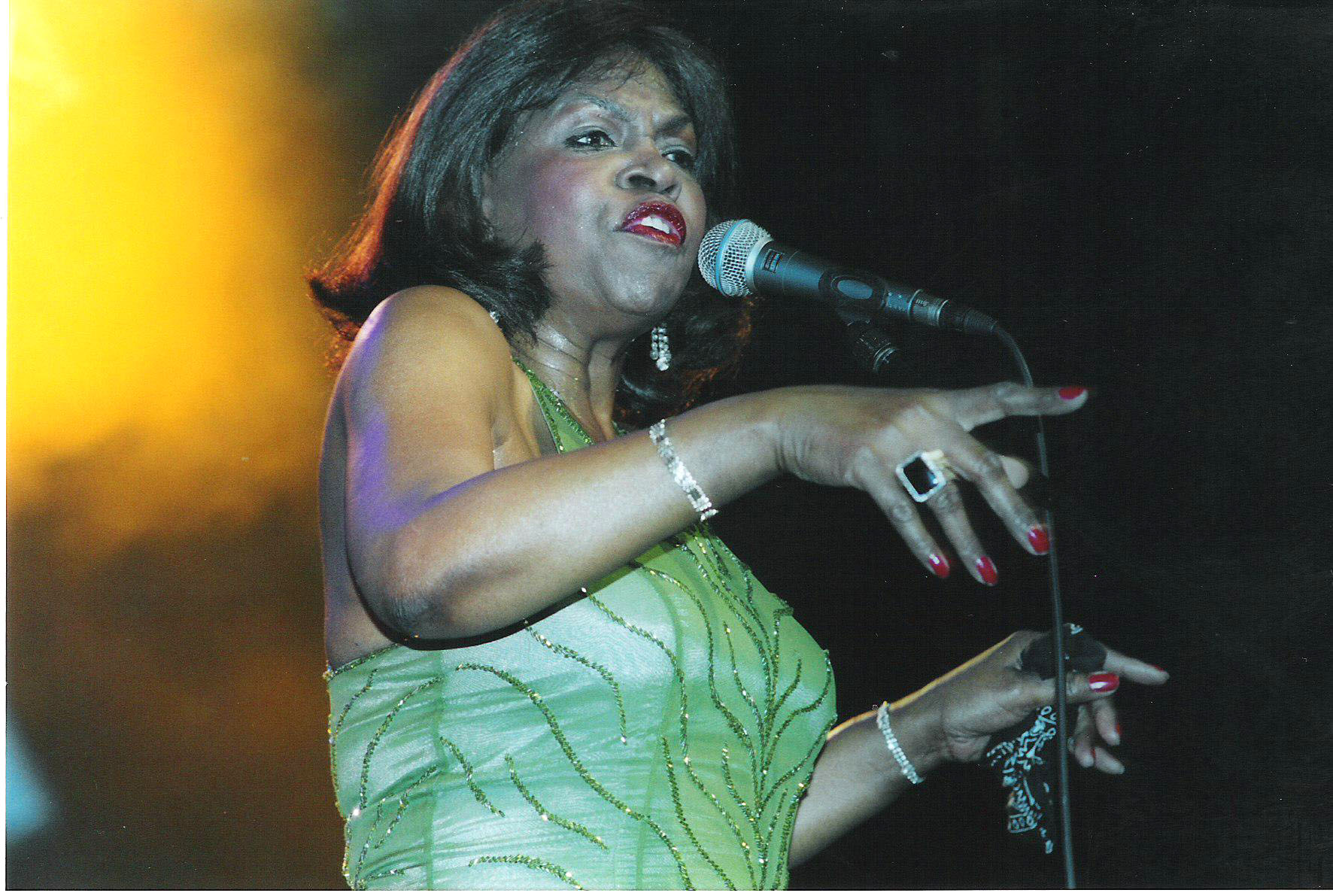
- Brown performing in Colne, England 2005

Background information
- Born: Maxine Ella Brown; August 18, 1939 (age 87); Kingstree, South Carolina, U.S.
- Genres: Soul, R&B, gospel
- Occupations: Musician, songwriter, record producer
- Instrument: Vocals
- Years active: 1960–2019
- Labels: Nomar, ABC-Paramount, Wand, Avco

Maxine Ella Brown (born August 18, 1939) is an American soul and R&B singer.

== Background and career ==
Maxine Brown began singing as a child, performing with two New York City-based gospel groups called the Angelairs and the Royaltones when she was a teenager. In 1960, she signed with the small Nomar record label, who released the deep soul ballad "All in My Mind" (which was written by Brown) late in the year. The single became a hit, climbing to number two on the US Billboard R&B chart (number 19 pop), and it was quickly followed by "Funny", which peaked at number three on the R&B chart and number 25 on the Hot 100

Brown was poised to become a star and moved to the bigger ABC-Paramount in 1962. She left the label after an unsuccessful year recording several non-chart singles for the label, and signed to the New York-based uptown soul label, Wand Records, a Scepter Records subsidiary, in 1963.

Brown recorded a string of sizable hits for Wand over the next three years. Among these were the Carole King/Gerry Goffin songs "Oh No Not My Baby", which reached number 24 on the pop chart in 1964, and "It's Gonna Be Alright", which peaked at number 26 on the R&B chart the following year. She also recorded duets with label-mate Chuck Jackson, including a reworked version of an Alvin Robinson hit, "Something You Got", which climbed to number 10 on the R&B chart. However, the company turned its focus to other bigger-selling acts, especially Dionne Warwick.

All backing vocals for Brown's records were performed by Cissy Houston and the Sweet Inspirations (the same group that backed Elvis Presley), plus emerging writer-producers Nick Ashford and Valerie Simpson. Hoping to increase the line of hits for Brown and her singing partner, Chuck Jackson, Ashford and Simpson took their song catalog to Scepter Records looking for a deal. When they were turned down, the couple approached Berry Gordy at Motown Records who immediately hired them. Songs that were penned for Brown and Jackson became blockbuster hits for Ray Charles, such as "Let's Go Get Stoned" (co-written by Jo Armstead), as well as Marvin Gaye and Tammi Terrell's "Ain't No Mountain High Enough".

In 1969, Brown left Wand Records for Commonwealth United, where she recorded two singles, the first "We'll Cry Together" reached number 10 in the Billboard R&B chart and also made the lower reaches of the Hot 100. A spell with Avco Records followed, but her later recordings generally met with little commercial success.

== Discography ==
=== Hit singles ===
Year	Single	Chart positions	
Year	Single	US	US R&B
1961	"All in My Mind"	19	2
1961	"Funny"	25	3
1961	"After All We've Been Through"	102	—
1962	"I Got a Funny Kind of Feeling"	104	—
1962	"My Time for Cryin'"	98	—
1963	"Ask Me"	75	—
1964	"Coming Back to You"	99	*
1964	"Oh No Not My Baby"	24	*
1965	"It's Gonna Be Alright"	56	26
1965	"Something You Got" (with Chuck Jackson)	55	10
1965	"One Step at a Time"	55	—
1965	"Can't Let You Out of My Sight" (with Chuck Jackson)	91	—
1965	"I Need You So" (with Chuck Jackson)	98	—
1965	"If You Gotta Make a Fool of Somebody"	63	—
1966	"I'm Satisfied" (with Chuck Jackson)	112	—
1966	"I Don't Need Anything"	129	—
1967	"Hold On I'm Coming" (with Chuck Jackson)	91	20
1967	"Daddy's Home" (with Chuck Jackson)	91	46
1969	"We'll Cry Together"	73	15
1970	"I Can't Get Along Without You"	—	44
"—" denotes a release that did not chart.

Note

* no R&B charts published during these chart runs

=== Albums ===
- Maxine Brown – 1961
- The Fabulous Sound of Maxine Brown – 1962
- Maxine Brown, Irma Thomas & Ronnie Dickerson – 1964
- Spotlight on Maxine Brown – 1964
- Maxine Brown's Greatest Hits [LP] – 1967
- Out of Sight - 1968
- We'll Cry Together – 1969, No. 195 US
- Blue Ribbon Country, Vol. 1 – 1975
- One in a Million – 1984
- Like Never Before – 1985
- Oh No Not My Baby: The Best of Maxine Brown – 1990
