= If You Gotta Make a Fool of Somebody =

Single by James Ray

from the album James Ray
- B-side: "It's Been a Drag"
- Released: 1961
- Recorded: 1961
- Length: 2:00
- Label: Caprice CAP-110
- Songwriter: Rudy Clark
- Producer: Gerry Granahan

James Ray singles chronology
"You Need to Fall in Love" (1959)	"If You Gotta Make a Fool of Somebody" (1961)	"Itty Bitty Pieces" (1962)

"If You Gotta Make a Fool of Somebody" is a song written by Rudy Clark and first recorded by James Ray in 1961. Ray's recording on the Caprice label, arranged by Hutch Davie and produced by Gerry Granahan, reached number 10 on the US Billboard R&B chart and number 22 on the Hot 100 in early 1962.

== Influence ==
In 1962, the Beatles began to perform the song at their gigs, with John Lennon singing lead and playing harmonica. Paul McCartney said that George Harrison had a copy of Ray's record, "and we did a version of it because we thought it was such a wacky waltz. No one had a 3/4 number. And an R'n'B waltz, that was new! The London bands used to gather round when they'd hear us do it in Hamburg. Lots of bands all hanging, having a beer when we were on, and I consciously remember them all hanging round for that one....". Ray's single was reputedly included in John Lennon's jukebox, the subject of a 2004 compilation album.

== Freddie and the Dreamers recording ==
Manchester beat group Freddie and the Dreamers heard the Beatles play the song at the Cavern in Liverpool in September 1962, and soon began to incorporate it into their own act. The group recorded it with producer John Burgess, and their version reached number 3 on the UK Singles Chart in 1963, the first hit of their career. It is also the opening track on their eponymous debut album.

== Other recordings ==
The song has been recorded by many other musicians, including:

- In late 1965, the song was covered by soul singer Maxine Brown. Her version, on the Wand label, reached number 63 on the Hot 100.
- In mid 1962 The Beatles performed the song at The Cavern Club which was recorded, though unreleased
- Brian Poole and the Tremeloes (1963)
- Timi Yuro (1963)
- Eddie Floyd (1967)
- Jackie DeShannon (1967)
- Aretha Franklin (1969) on her Soul '69 LP.
- Vanilla Fudge (1969)
- Ben E. King (1970)
- Bobbie Gentry (1970)
- Ronnie Wood (1974)
- Lou Rawls (1990)
- Joanne Shaw Taylor (2021).
- In Italy, in 1964, the Marino's band and especially the famous singer Adriano Celentano recorded the Italian version entitled Il problema più importante (The most important problem), the Italian text is by Luciano Beretta and Miki Del Prete (Nuova Enigmistica Tascabile, N. 511).
