= Freddie Garrity =

English singer (1936–2006)

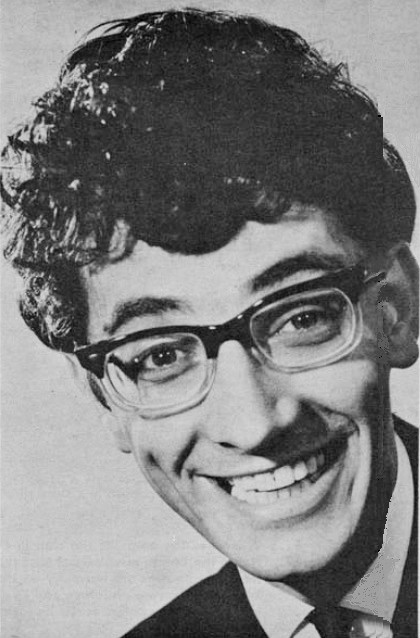
- Garrity in 1965

Background information
- Born: 14 November 1936; Crumpsall, Manchester, England
- Died: 20 May 2006 (aged 69) Bangor, Wales
- Occupations: Singer, actor, entertainer
- Years active: 1959–2001

Frederick Garrity (14 November 1936 – 20 May 2006) was an English singer and actor. He was best known as the frontman of Freddie and the Dreamers from 1959 until his retirement in 2001.

== Biography ==
The Dreamers and I have always been daft. You couldn't call me a sex-idol, could you? Collectively, we're no glamour boys.

— Freddie Garrity

Born in Crumpsall, Manchester, the eldest son of Frederick Garrity and Elsie Clynes, Freddie worked as a milkman while playing in local skiffle groups: the Red Sox, the John Norman Four and, finally, the Kingfishers, who became Freddie and the Dreamers in 1959.

In the early years of the band, Garrity's official birth-date was given as 14 November 1940 to make him appear younger and, therefore, more appealing to the youth market who bought the majority of records sold in the UK.

Garrity's trademark was his comic dancing (see the Freddie) and his habit of leaping up and down during performances. This, combined with his almost skeletal appearance and horn-rimmed glasses, made him an eccentric figure in the UK rock scene of the early 1960s.

Freddie and the Dreamers began to lose commercial ground in 1966, and disbanded in the late 1960s. Between 1968 and 1973, Garrity and his former bandmate Pete Birrell appeared in the ITV children's television show Little Big Time. Garrity made a solo appearance on the first episode of the Granada Television production The Wheeltappers and Shunters Social Club singing "Try a Little Kindness" and "Good Morning Starshine", broadcast on 13 April 1974; in the sitcom Dear John, he appeared as himself for one episode in both the British original in 1987 and the American version in 1989 (episode: The Return of Ricky S01, E11 (first broadcast: 19 January 1989)); in 1990 he appeared in the final episode of Rowland Rivron's comedy show Set of Six; and, in 1993, he appeared in an episode of Heartbeat as an amateur DJ named Tiny Weedon who in the episode plays the Freddie and the Dreamers record "You Were Made for Me", on the conclusion of which he jokingly credits the artists as "Freda and the Dreamers."

After his television career ended, Garrity formed a new version of Freddie and the Dreamers and toured regularly for the next two decades, but no further records or chart success came their way. He continued to perform until 2001, when he was diagnosed with emphysema after having a heart attack during a flight from America to Britain that forced him to retire.

== Death ==
With his health in decline, Garrity settled in a bungalow called "Dreamers End" in Moreton Avenue, in Newcastle-under-Lyme.

He was married three times and had one daughter from his first marriage, and three children from his second marriage. He died on 20 May 2006, at Bangor in North Wales, at the age of 69, after falling ill on holiday. Garrity was cremated at the Carmountside Crematorium in Abbey Hulton, Stoke-on-Trent, his family collected the ashes and held a private funeral.
