= Freddie and the Dreamers =

English beat band

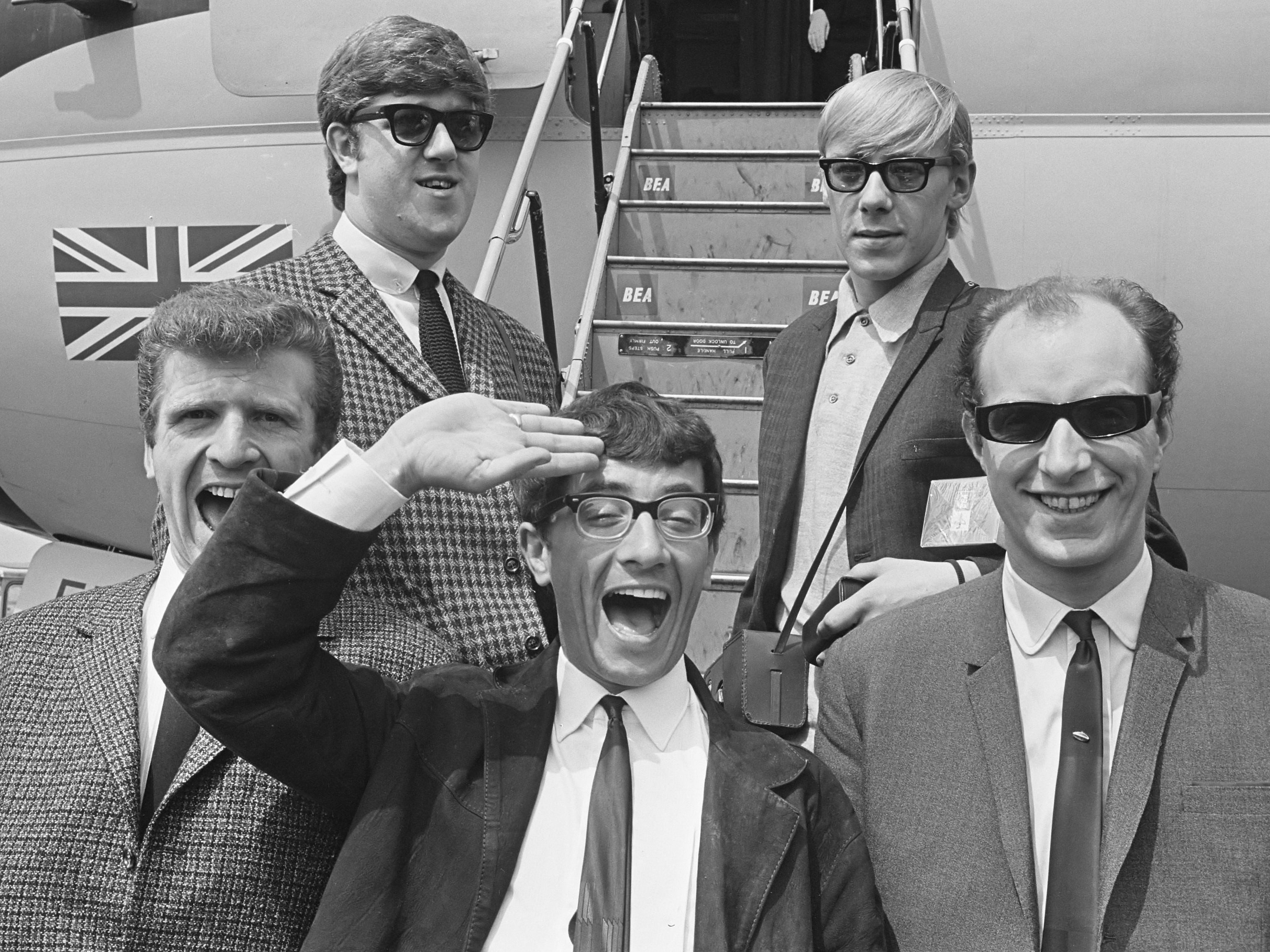
- Freddie and the Dreamers in 1964. From left to right: Bernie Dwyer, Pete Birrell, Freddie Garrity, Derek Quinn, Roy Crewdson.

Background information
- Origin: Manchester, England
- Genres: Beat, novelty
- Years active: 1962–2000
- Labels: Columbia (EMI) (UK); Capitol; Tower; Mercury (US)
- Past members: Freddie Garrity; Roy Crewdson; Derek Quinn; Peter Birrell; Bernie Dwyer

Freddie and the Dreamers were an English beat band that had a number of hit records between 1962 and 1965. The band was well-known for their stage act, which was enhanced by the comic antics of frontman Freddie Garrity.

== History ==
The band, formed in March 1962 in West Didsbury, Manchester, consisted of vocalist Freddie Garrity (1936-2006), guitarist Roy Crewdson (1941-2025), guitarist/harmonica player Derek Quinn (1942-2020), bassist Peter Birrell (born 1941), and drummer Bernie Dwyer (1940-2002). Although the band was grouped as part of the Merseybeat sound phenomenon centred around Liverpool, they came from Manchester. Prior to becoming a singer, Garrity had worked as a milkman in Manchester and bassist Birrell was a shoe salesman.

They had four Top 10 UK hits: a cover of James Ray's hit "If You Gotta Make a Fool of Somebody", which reached number 3 in the UK Singles Chart in mid-1963, "I'm Telling You Now" (number 2 in August), "You Were Made for Me" (number 3 in November) and a cover of The G-Clefs' "I Understand", which hit the number 5 spot in November 1964.

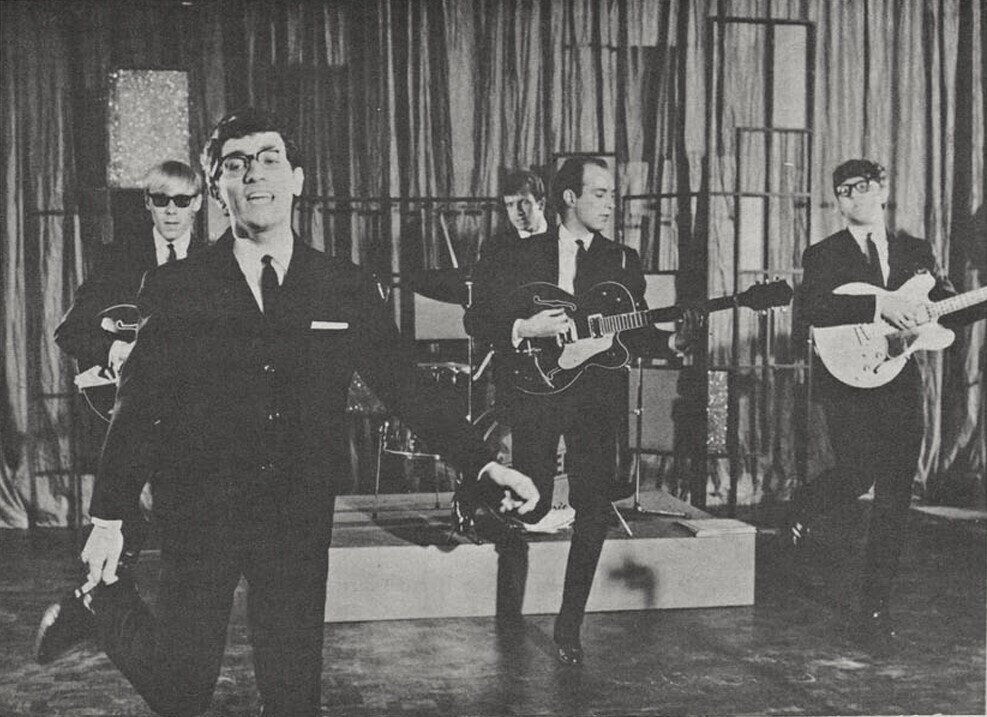
Freddie and the Dreamers "do the Freddie" in 1965

Their eponymous debut album was released in the United Kingdom in 1963, peaking at number five in the UK Albums Chart and reaching number 19 in the US albums chart on 22 May 1965. It was the only LP by the group to chart in America; their subsequent four albums in the UK failed to chart.

On stage, the group performed rehearsed, synchronised comedic dance routines. Their best-known routine was the Freddie, a jumping jack-like dance which they performed onstage at the Ed Sullivan Show and became a short-lived fad. They appeared in four British films: What a Crazy World with Joe Brown, Just for You, Cuckoo Patrol with Kenneth Connor and Victor Maddern and Every Day's A Holiday (US title Seaside Swingers) with Mike Sarne, Ron Moody and John Leyton.

Between 1968 and 1973, Garrity and Birrell appeared in the UK ITV children's show Little Big Time, a zany music/talent/adventure show with audience participation.

Garrity and Birrell formed a new version of Freddie and the Dreamers in the mid-1970s, releasing three albums on the Arny's Shack label in 1976, 1978 and 1983, although Birrell had left before the third release.

== Legacy ==
In the 1980 Rolling Stone History of Rock & Roll, Lester Bangs wrote of the group:

Freddie and the Dreamers [had] no masterpiece but a plenitude of talentless idiocy and enough persistence to get four albums and one film soundtrack released ... the Dreamers looked as thuggish as Freddie looked dippy ... Freddie and the Dreamers represented a triumph of rock as cretinous swill, and as such should be not only respected, but given their place in history.

== Founding members ==
- Freddie Garrity – vocals (1962–2000; died 2006)
- Derek Quinn – lead guitar (1962–1971; died 2020)
- Roy Crewdson – rhythm guitar (1962–1971; died 2025)
- Pete Birrell – bass (1962–1971; 1974–1980s)
- Bernie Dwyer – drums (1962–1971; died 2002)

== See also ==
- Beat music
