= Jim Connolly (illustrator) =

English illustrator, designer, artist

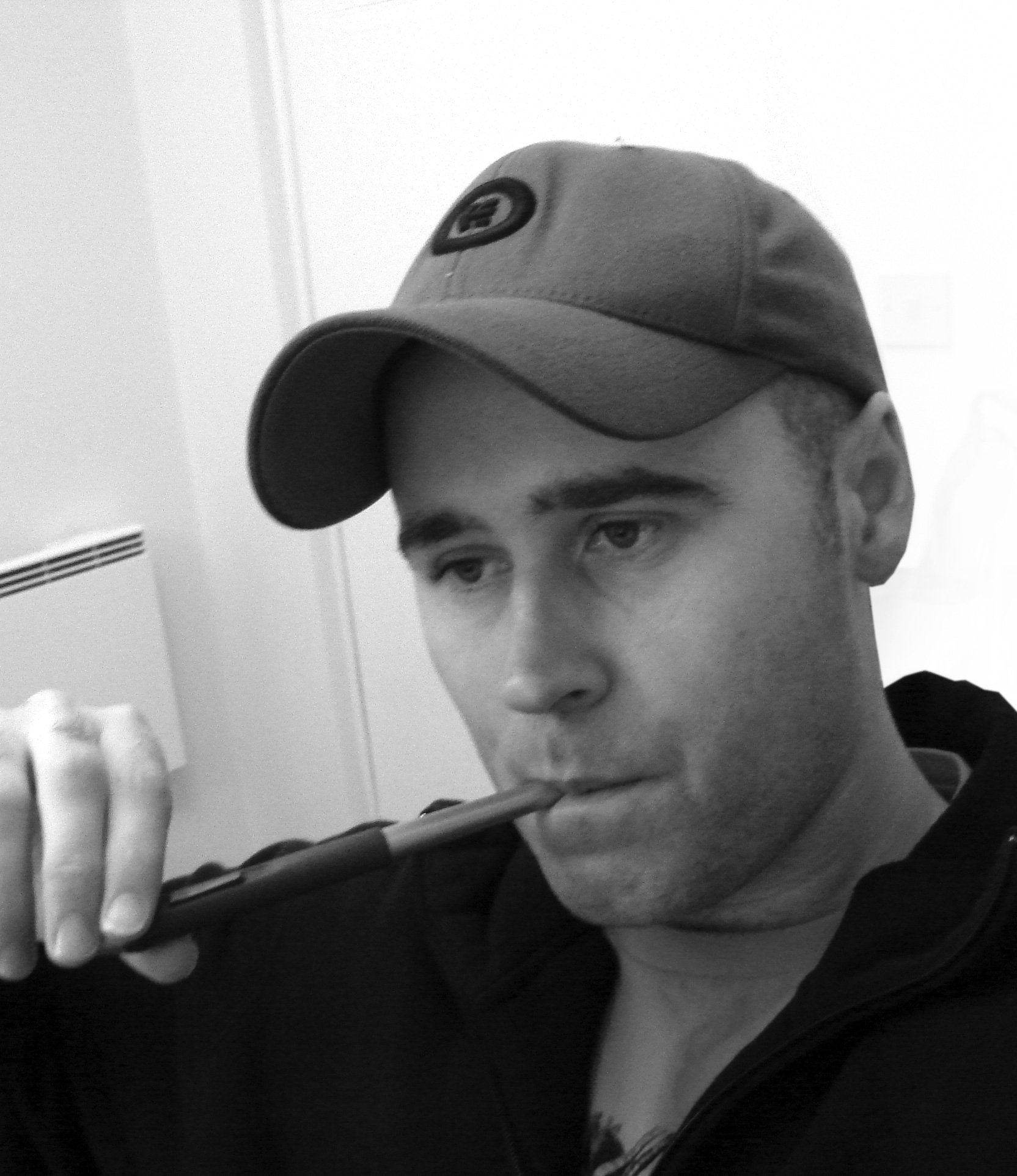
- Jim Connolly at work.
- Born: 1978 (age 47–48); Sheffield, England
- Education: Manchester Metropolitan University
- Known for: Illustration, design, art

Jim Connolly (born 1978) is an English illustrator, designer and commercial artist from Sheffield. He is best known for creating comic book style designs for album/single covers, concert posters, magazine articles and silkscreen prints. His style features loud and brash bubblegum colours and comical characters usually drawn with a sharp vectorized look. The dominant features of his work usually include comic book, science fiction and horror references, often with a UK slant. Beyond his comic book style work he has also worked in a variety of different styles as an illustrator and designer, mainly on outsourced E-Learning games for the BBC and Channel 4 via several E-Learning companies.

== Early work ==
Connolly studied illustration and animation at Manchester Metropolitan University under the tuition of illustrator Ian Whadcock. During his time in Manchester he first began creating and contributing to many underground comics and fanzines. This early work later evolved into the creation of concert posters and album/single artwork for several bands.

== Concert posters and album artwork ==
'Relaxed Muscle' by Jim Connolly.

Having seen Connolly's designs for the Ape Drape Escape, The Barbs commissioned him to work on two singles and an album cover. Their single 'Massive Crush' reached No. 1 in the Philippines music chart in late 2004. In September 2004 Big Cheese Magazine (in issue 55) featured an article about the relationship between the Barb's music and Jim Connolly's artwork.

Relaxed Muscle, a side-project of Jarvis Cocker, Richard Hawley and Jason Buckle, used a Connolly-penned depiction of the band on the digital content on their album A Heavy Night With.... This can be seen alongside the band's quirky music videos.

Connolly's love of punk rock led him also to design posters for appearances by The Buzzcocks, The Damned, The Misfits and Zombina and the Skeletones. Swampy bluesmith Mr David Viner also received the poster treatment on a visit to Sheffield University Students Union. This led to other commissions from Sheffield University Students Union including the consistent logo design for their annual 'Band Comp'.

In 2006 Jim Bob re-worked a gig poster designed by Connolly into the cover of a 'best of' solo album Best of Jim Bob.

== Editorial illustration ==
Exposed Magazine commissioned several designs primarily as profile pictures for their reviewers and then for their film column, where they have used Connolly mainly to visualise the latest comic book film adaptions. Sandman Magazine has also recently used Connolly's work in articles featuring Madchester icon Clint Boon and all-female Manchester punk band Hotpants Romance.

== Art prints ==
Jim Connolly's 'Terror at Tinsley Towers'.

In 2008, The Archipelago Press Company released a silkscreen print by Connolly satirising the destruction of Sheffield's iconic Tinsley cooling towers. In Jim's version of events the towers are destroyed dramatically by UFOs and onlookers are seen fleeing for their lives.

The popularity of the original print led to the release of a Henderson's Relish inspired print titled 'Use the Sauce' in November 2008, again via The Archipelago Press Company which has stated that a further four prints (six in total) will be produced continuing the Sheffield/comic book satirical theme.

In April 2009 a third print was released entitled 'Bargains of the Damned', which features a mock zombie film poster with a parody of South Yorkshire mall Meadowhall shopping centre as the focus. The film Dawn of the Dead is stated as a key influence on the image.

An exhibition will be held (in an as-yet unknown venue) in Sheffield sometime in late 2009 when the series is completed.

== Future work ==
Alongside future art prints Connolly is also collaborating with graphic novelist Anjan Sarkar on a comic project titled 'Moronoid'. Previously the two have collaborated on single covers for the Ape Drape Escape.

== Music and writing ==
Connolly is an original member of the alternative band the Ape Drape Escape and played drums on their debut E.P. 'The Fracture Clinic', which received four 'K's from Kerrang magazine (from reviewer Camilla Pia) on 25 October 2003. He left the band but continues to make music with the comedy punk band the Friends of Batman, in which he is a co-singer/songwriter. They have been labelled 'ramshackle' by Sandman Magazine for their unrehearsed and drunken performances. He is also an occasional magazine article writer and comic book enthusiast. He managed to combine the two by interviewing influential comic artist (and fellow Sheffielder) Paul Grist in July 2008.
