= Coles Corner (disambiguation) =

Coles Corner is the corner of Fargate and Church Street in Sheffield, England.

Coles Corner may also refer to:

- Coles Corner (album), an album by Richard Hawley
- Coles Corner, Washington, a small community in the U.S. state of Washington
- Coles Corner or Cole's Corner (record shop and cafe bar on Abbeydale Road in Sheffield), opened Dec 2019 www.colescorner.co.uk

== See also ==
- Cole Brothers, now John Lewis, a department store in Sheffield, England
