= Fargate =

Street in Sheffield, England

Coordinates: 53.381573°N 1.469116°W

Fargate is a pedestrian precinct and shopping area in Sheffield, England. It runs between Barker's Pool and High Street opposite the cathedral. It was pedestrianised in 1973.

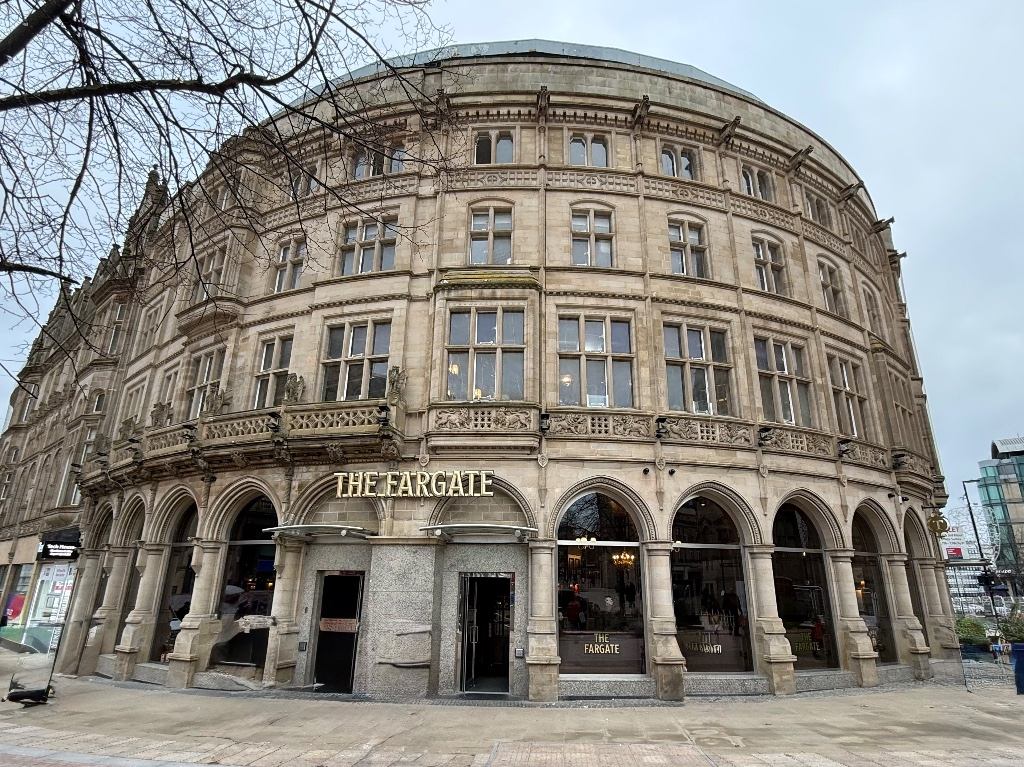
The Fargate

Fargate also holds a Continental Market approximately 4 times a year, which includes European stalls selling cheeses, confectionery, clothing, plants and crafts including jewellery and ornaments.

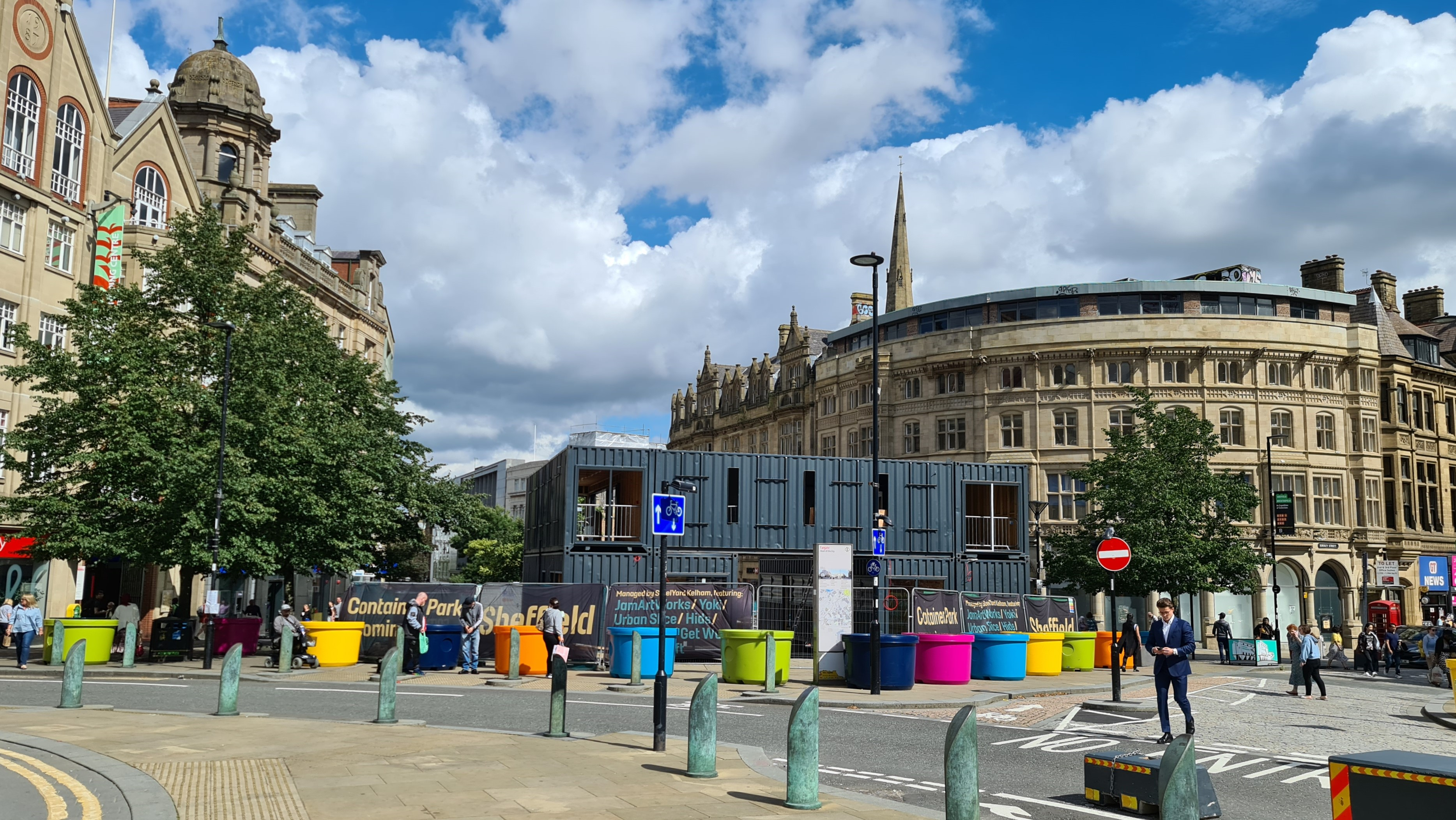
The top of Fargate

== History ==
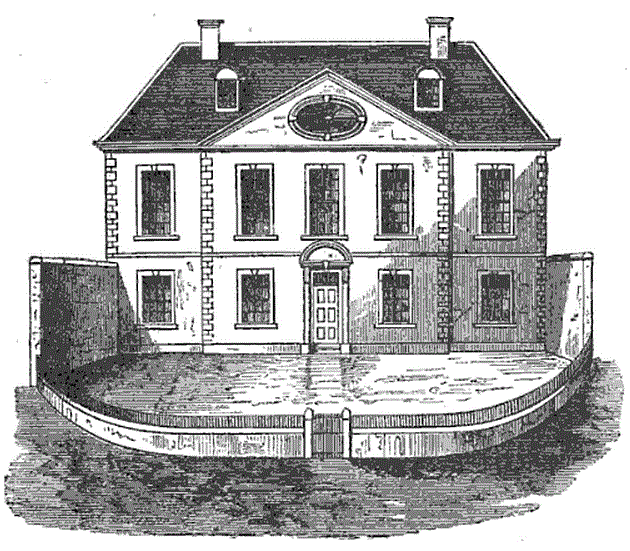
The Lord's House on Fargate, as drawn by Alfred Gatty.

Joseph Woolhouse, in his "A Description of the Town of Sheffield", wrote in 1832 while the cholera was raging in Sheffield:

In going up Fargate there was houses built on both sides. The Lords House stood a little on the North side of the present Norfolk Row. A very elegant old House, it was inclosed by a Wall in a half Circle and Palisaded. The present Duke of Norfolk was born in this house. This I expect is the reason why it was called the Lord's house, he being I.of the Manor.

More recently, the street was home to Sheffield Assay Office. Since 1994, Fargate has been served by Cathedral tram stop on the South Yorkshire Supertram network.

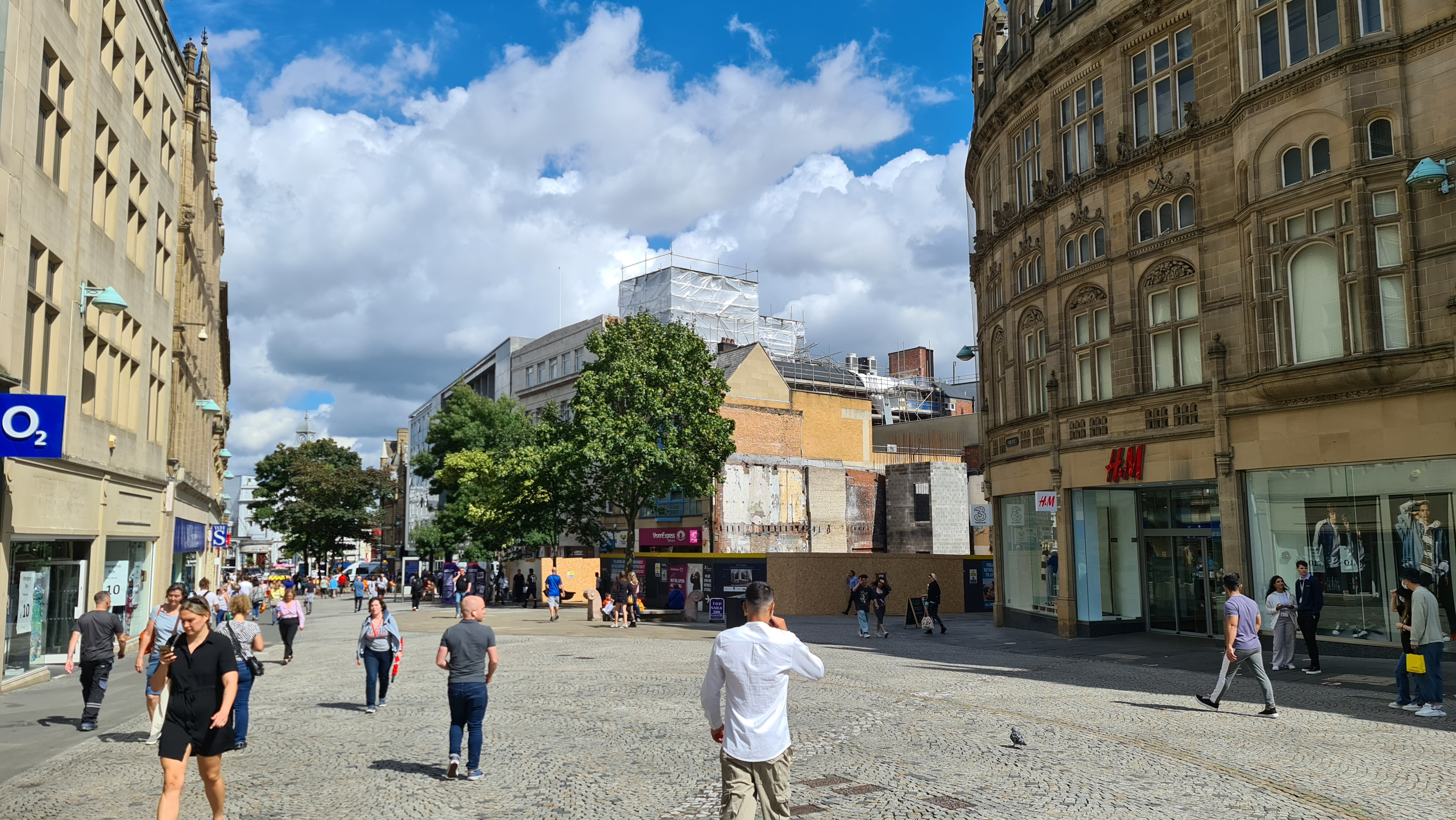
Fargate shopping area

== Coles Corner ==
The corner at bottom the end of Fargate (opposite the cathedral) is known locally as Coles Corner. It was a famous meeting point in the city named after the Cole Brothers department store that occupied the building before it moved in 1963 to Barker's Pool (on the plot originally occupied by the Albert Hall cinema, which burnt down in 1937)

The Fargate site is now home to a modern building, which currently houses Burger King, Starbucks Coffee and Greggs. A plaque has been erected in memory of the old Cole Brothers store. The location was immortalised by Richard Hawley's album and song.

== Carmel House ==
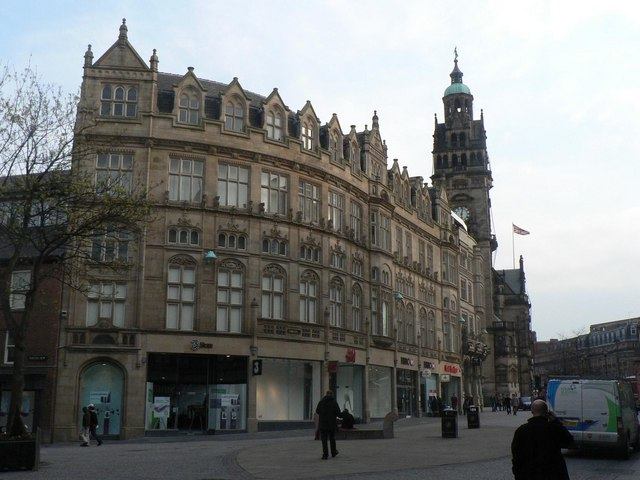
Carmel House

In November 2005, the University of Sheffield´s archaeological consultancy, ARCUS, unearthed a medieval well of over three metres in depth in the sandstone bedrock beneath Carmel House on Fargate. The Sheffield city centre site was being excavated as part of a redevelopment project.

Pottery found in the well suggested that it was in use by 1300 AD, and had been filled in around the time of the English Civil War. Medieval pots included jugs made in the Hallgate area of nearby Doncaster and other items from the Humber Estuary.

This discovery was said to offer significant evidence relating to the medieval town of Sheffield, still a small market town, before its growth during the subsequent Industrial Revolution. Dating of the well indicates that it was probably dug around the time of the rebuilding of Sheffield Castle in stone, in 1270, and the granting of Sheffield's Market Charter by Edward I in 1296.

Due to the conditions in the well, animal bones and plant remains (possibly including microscopic pollen grains) were preserved and analysed by the University's Department of Archaeology laboratories.

In February 2005, Sheffield City Council's Executive Director of Development and Leisure had commented, "Carmel House, at the junction of Fargate and Norfolk Row is an imposing Victorian stone fronted Grade II listed building which, together with the adjoining terrace of attractive Georgian brick properties, is almost completely empty and is in need of refurbishment. Full planning permission was granted in January 2004 for a comprehensive scheme which will involve creating four new modern retail units by demolishing the existing buildings behind the retained façade."

The Council's Conservation Advisory Group "regretted that its advice regarding the development of Carmel House had not been taken into account and it wondered whether Carmel House would be liable to be removed from the List of Buildings of Special Architectural or Historic Interest, in view of the extent of demolition which had taken place."

== Goodwin Fountain ==
The Goodwin Fountain stood on Fargate from 1961 to 1998. It was paid for by a donation by industrialist Sir Stuart Goodwin and his wife, and was originally dedicated to Alderman James Sterling, but the informal name stuck and was eventually made official. It was replaced by a new fountain, bearing the same name, in the nearby Peace Gardens.

== Ferris wheel ==
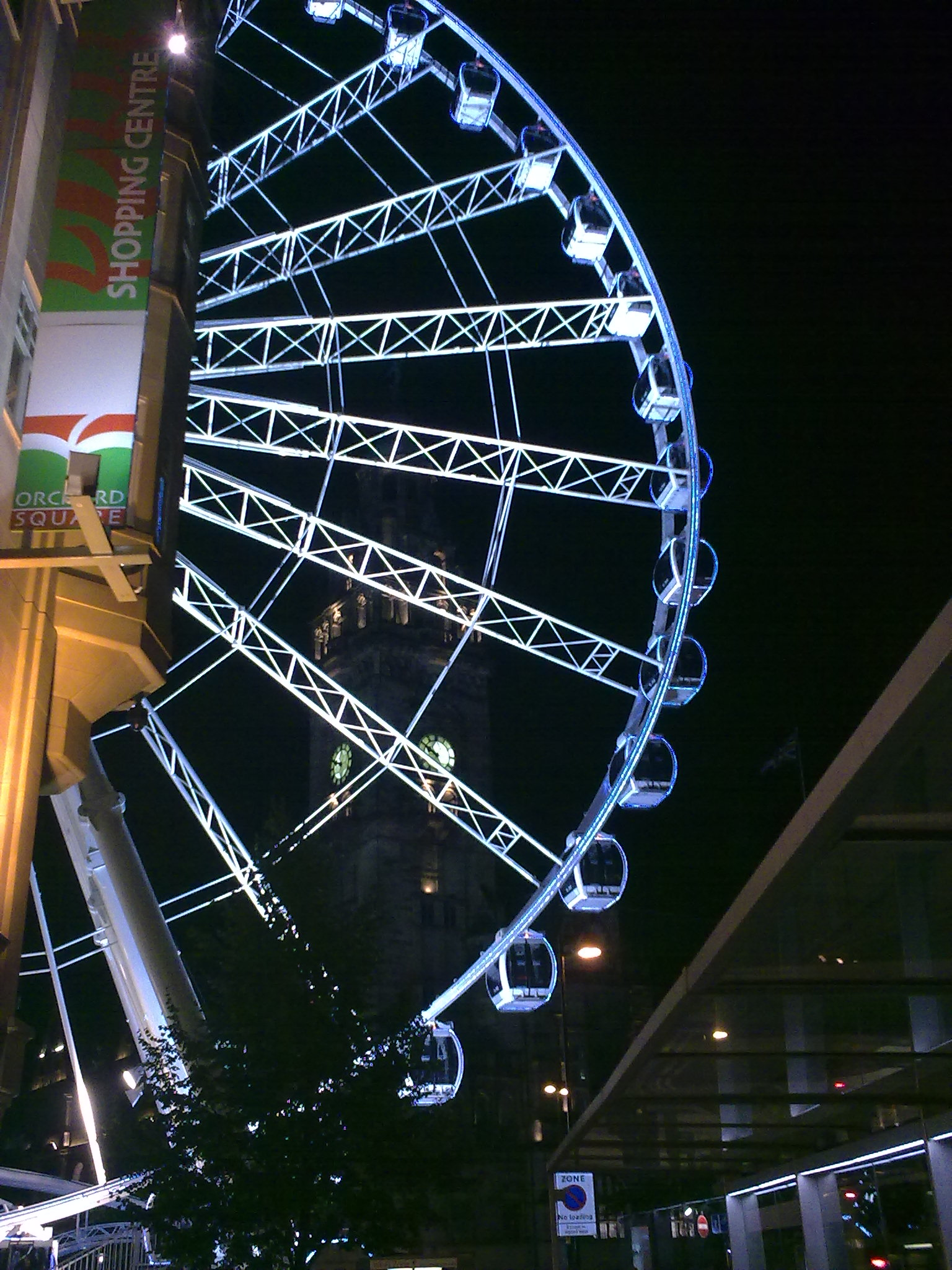
Fargate Ferris wheel

The Wheel of Sheffield was a 173 feet (53 m) tall Ferris wheel assembled on Fargate in mid-July 2009 in ten days and remained at the top of the pedestrian street until November 2010. It had 42 gondolas, each capable of carrying up to eight people.
