= Standing at the Sky's Edge =

Studio album by Richard Hawley
- Released: 7 May 2012
- Recorded: Yellow Arch Studios, Sheffield
- Genres: Alternative rock, chamber pop, neo-psychedelia
- Length: 50:27
- Labels: Parlophone (UK); Mute (US)
- Producers: Richard Hawley and Colin Elliot

Richard Hawley chronology
Truelove's Gutter (2009)	Standing at the Sky's Edge (2012)	Hollow Meadows (2015)

Singles from Standing at the Sky's Edge
- 1. "Leave Your Body Behind You" Released: 23 April 2012; 2. "Down in the Woods" Released: 15 July 2012; 3. "Seek It" Released: 30 September 2012; 4. "Don't Stare at the Sun" Released: 25 February 2013

Standing at the Sky's Edge is the seventh studio album from English musician Richard Hawley, released in the UK on 7 May 2012 and in the US on 28 August 2012. The album is markedly different from Hawley's previous efforts, often relinquishing softer instrumentation in favour of squalling guitars. As with all of Hawley's previous albums, the title obliquely refers to a location in his native city of Sheffield, in this case Skye Edge, a hillside area with views over the city centre and formerly known for its crime-ridden estates but largely redeveloped in the mid-2000s.

On 12 September 2012 the album was nominated for the 2012 Mercury Prize, Hawley's second nomination after 2005's Coles Corner.

== Background ==
According to Hawley the album was written while taking his dog for his daily walks near his home in the western suburbs of Sheffield: "The album was more or less written on those walks. I'd come back with whole songs, melodies and all, on my mobile phone." Hawley has described Standing at the Sky’s Edge as "an angry album... I wanted the music to suit the mood of the songs". Coming from a working-class socialist background, Hawley disagreed with many of the policies of the Conservative Party which became the dominant party in the coalition government following the 2010 general election, saying "I think I started writing when the Tories got in – it influenced a lot of the first song which was 'Down in the Woods'. They were trying to sell off the forest land, and that had me really fucking outraged." In an interview with The Guardian, Hawley stated, "I don't really write political songs but like most right-minded people I'm angry at what's happening here in Britain. It's to do with having kids, to a degree, and watching them grow and wondering what sort of mess we're going to leave them with." Referring to the album's title, he said, "Sky Edge, it's more a metaphor... we are stood on the edge, politically and socially...the album portrays the darkness of the woods being broken by the sun as it shines through... I suppose it's time for us to decide which side of the line do we stand, and I will always stand with the people, always".

Hawley has also described the untimely and tragic death in February 2010 of his close friend, Sheffield guitarist Tim McCall, as the "catalyst for a lot of musical activity" and the reason for the change in musical style on the album, saying "...the thing with Tim passing away... is that it made me kind of think musically is there anything I've left undone... and I thought, I haven't really ever just used the guitar as the only vehicle".

The track "The Wood Collier's Grave" was inspired by the headstone of 17th century collier (professional charcoal-burner) George Yardley, discovered by Hawley on one of his country walks.

== Release and promotion ==
The album was released in the UK as a digital download and on Parlophone Records on CD and double vinyl gatefold LP. In the US the album was made available digitally on 12 June 2012, with a physical release on LP and CD on Mute Records on 28 August 2012.

The first single released from the album was "Leave Your Body Behind You", which was premiered on Radcliffe and Maconie's BBC Radio 6 Music programme: a 10" vinyl version, limited to 750 copies, was released on 23 April 2012 to tie in with Record Store Day in the UK, with the digital download version of the single following on 7 May, the date of the album's release. Hawley's label Parlophone announced that three further singles from the album would be released, also on 10" vinyl, as part of the "Richard Hawley Record Club". The second single released from the album was "Down in the Woods" on 15 July 2012, the third single "Seek It" was released on 30 September 2012, and the fourth and final single "Don't Stare at the Sun" was released on 25 February 2013. Shortly after the announcement of the album's release date, Hawley announced his largest UK concert to date at the Brixton Academy on 3 October 2012.

Standing at the Sky's Edge debuted at number three in the UK albums chart with sales of 16,070 albums in its first week, becoming Hawley's highest charting album to date.

== Critical reception ==
Professional ratings
Aggregate scores
Source	Rating
Metacritic	77/100
Review scores
Source	Rating
AllMusic	4/5 stars
BBC Music	favourable
Clash	9/10
Consequence of Sound	4/5 stars
The Guardian	5/5 stars
The Independent	4/5 stars
NME	8/10
Pitchfork	5.1/10
PopMatters	8/10
Uncut	3.5/5 stars

Critical reviews for the album were generally very positive. BBC Music said that "After a decade of... the Roy Orbison stylings of several critically acclaimed and, latterly, commercially successful albums, Sheffield's most unlikely pop star is back, and this time he's rocking out... Standing at the Sky's Edge is the sound of Hawley cutting loose, and clearly enjoying it". AllMusic said "Hawley's subjects and protagonists are downtrodden, broken, or near despair, but very human, and he never sacrifices people for the sake of sound. By employing hard-rocking, sometimes spacey psychedelia (gloriously) to express the anger he feels as he watches the hard-won gains of history being damaged and destroyed in unsavory ways, Hawley creates an essential listen." The Independent stated that "Richard Hawley has upped his game considerably on his first album for Parlophone, leaving behind his urbane, rockabilly-tinged retro-nuevo style for a full-blooded immersion in ringing psychedelic rock. It's totally unexpected, and completely winning." The Guardian noted that "the musical shift of Standing at the Sky's Edge is a hazardous strategy, not least because it plays against a lot of Hawley's strengths. Smothering his lovely, careworn voice in electronic effects and swamping his lyrics amid waves of guitar could in theory distance him from the listener" but concluded "as it turns out, everything you might have loved about Hawley in the past is here... the same, but different: a tough trick, pulled off in style".

Uncut said of Standing at the Sky's Edge "that's not to say that this record is unrecognisable as the work of Richard Hawley. It is still after all a pretty sophisticated piece of retro music-making – only rather than painstakingly emulating the production values of the late 1950s and early 1960s, he's embraced the echoes, middle eastern modality and wah-wah effects of someone hellbent on creating a heavy psychedelic guitar record." NME felt that "Hawley has always had a telescopic view of rock history, discarding the modern pop frivolities of his guitar work with Longpigs and Pulp to record Mercury-nominated, string-shrouded albums... now he finally feels nostalgia's gotten old, and for this seventh album he's sacked the string section, fired up the psychedelic wah-wah and splurged on the nuclear sunset sounds of early Floyd, The Stooges, and – if we’re to allow him more modern references – early Verve and Spiritualized... It's the psychotropic noise blasts like 'Leave Your Body Behind You' that will make ...Sky's Edge one of 2012's most celebrated albums". PopMatters said "Much has been made of this game-changer of an album in Hawley's native England, where critics have called the release 'dark' and even 'psychedelic'" but "what Standing at the Sky's Edge loses in heartbreak it easily makes up for in depth, and Hawley has just given us something that is truly worth sinking into".

Other critics, however, were not so keen on Hawley's change in direction: The Independent on Sunday gave the record three stars out of five, calling it "a bewildering move... Hawley does psychedelic rock with more style, elegance and panache than most. None of which answers the question: why would he want to?", while Pitchfork considered the album to be "an out-and-out miscalculation by Hawley of his own strengths... an unwelcome return to a less distinguished period in Hawley's career, back before he knew how to make more beguiling music than this." MusicOMH felt that "it's great to hear Richard Hawley expanding his horizons and there's a lot to enjoy in this album" but that "the overall result is not altogether satisfying: some of the tracks seem overlong, as if the temptation to thrown in just a few more special effects has taken over from crafting a coherent piece of music... if some of the sound could be better defined, and the special effects shaken on with a slightly lighter hand, it would be more coherent and ultimately more impressive".

== Track listing ==
All songs written and composed by Richard Hawley.

1. "She Brings the Sunlight" – 7:23
2. "Standing at the Sky's Edge" – 6:39
3. "Time Will Bring You Winter" – 5:26
4. "Down in the Woods" – 5:23
5. "Seek It" – 5:11
6. "Don't Stare at the Sun" – 5:46
7. "The Wood Collier's Grave" – 3:07
8. "Leave Your Body Behind You – 5:19
9. "Before" – 6:13

US bonus track

10. "You Haunt Me" (B-side of 10" vinyl version of "Leave Your Body Behind You" in UK) – 3:08

Apple Music bonus track

10. "There's a Storm A-Comin'" (full version) (The original shorter version was released on 2009's False Lights from the Land EP) – 5:33

=== UK vinyl LP version ===
Disc One, side one

1. "She Brings the Sunlight" – 7:23
2. "Standing at the Sky's Edge" – 6:39

Disc One, side two

1. "Time Will Bring You Winter" – 5:26
2. "Down in the Woods" – 5:23

Disc Two, side one

1. "Seek It" – 5:11
2. "Don't Stare at the Sun" – 5:46

Disc Two, side two

1. "The Wood Collier's Grave" – 3:07
2. "Leave Your Body Behind You" – 5:19
3. "Before" – 6:13

== Charts ==
Chart (2012)	Peak position
Belgian Albums (Ultratop Flanders)	13
Belgian Albums (Ultratop Wallonia)	97
French Albums (SNEP)	49
Irish Albums (IRMA)	6
German Albums (Offizielle Top 100)	93
Norwegian Albums (VG-lista)	28
Spanish Albums (Promusicae)	54
UK Albums (Official Charts)	3

== Certifications ==
Region	Certification	Certified units/sales
United Kingdom (BPI)	Silver	60,000^{^}
^{^} Shipments figures based on certification alone.

== Personnel ==
- Dean Beresford – drums
- Sally Doherty – backing vocals on "Don't Stare at the Sun"
- Colin Elliot – electric bass, percussion, backing vocals
- Richard Hawley – guitar, lead vocals
- Tina Peacock – backing vocals on "Leave Your Body Behind You"
- Simon Robinson – backing vocals on "Leave Your Body Behind You"
- Shez Sheridan – guitar, backing vocals
- Martin Simpson - E-bowed slide guitar on "Before"
- Louise Thompson – backing vocals on "Leave Your Body Behind You"
- Jon Trier – piano, keyboards, synthesizers

== Musical ==
In March 2018, it was announced that a stage musical featuring Hawley's songs and named after the album would open in 2019 at Sheffield's Crucible Theatre. The story follows the lives of three families living on the city's Park Hill estate over a period of 60 years from 1960 to 2022. The musical subsequently transferred to the West End in February 2024.
