= In This City They Call You Love =

Studio album by Richard Hawley
- Released: 31 May 2024
- Length: 42:06
- Label: BMG Rights Management
- Producer: Richard Hawley; Colin Elliot; Mark Sheridan

Richard Hawley chronology
Further (2019)	In This City They Call You Love (2024)

Singles from In This City They Call You Love
- 1. "Two for His Heels" Released: 21 February 2024; 2. "Heavy Rain" Released: 28 March 2024; 3. "Prism in Jeans" Released: 2 May 2024

In This City They Call You Love is the tenth studio album by English singer-songwriter Richard Hawley, released on 31 May 2024 through BMG Rights Management. The album was preceded by the release of the singles "Two for His Heels", "Heavy Rain" and "Prism in Jeans". It received positive reviews from critics.

== Critical reception ==
Professional ratings
Aggregate scores
Source	Rating
Metacritic	84/100
Review scores
Source	Rating
Clash	8/10
Mojo	4/5 stars
MusicOMH	4/5 stars
Uncut	8/10

In This City They Call You Love received a score of 84 out of 100 on review aggregator Metacritic, based on four critics' reviews, which the website categorised as "universal acclaim". Mojo wrote that "Hawley continues to enchant" on the album, while Uncut felt that it "rests on his strengths. His balladeer's voice is a steadying comfort on 'Heavy Rain', adding subtle Orbison shivers on 'I'll Never Get Over You'. Duane Eddy-like twangs judder through murder ballad 'Two for His Heels', and a guitar solo scorches 'Deep Space'. The album's beating heart, though, is 'People', a supernal acoustic tribute to Sheffield".

John Murphy of MusicOMH described the album as "the usual mix of spine-tingling ballads and uproarious rockers. It seems a bit more wistful than his last couple of albums [...] with a return to the luxurious strings that saw Coles Corner become a timeless classic". Clash's Richard Bowes wrote that In This City They Call You Love "bristles with ideas" and called it "an album of universal themes and tones, and one of Richard Hawley's finest".

== Track listing ==
All tracks are written by Richard Hawley.

In This City They Call You Love track listing
No.	Title	Length
1.	"Two for His Heels"	3:02
2.	"Have Love"	4:32
3.	"Prism in Jeans"	2:52
4.	"Heavy Rain"	3:33
5.	"People"	4:04
6.	"Hear That Lonesome Whistle Blow"	3:26
7.	"Deep Space"	3:58
8.	"Deep Waters"	3:23
9.	"I'll Never Get Over You"	3:25
10.	"Do I Really Need to Know?"	3:34
11.	"When the Lights Go Out"	3:05
12.	"'Tis Night"	3:12
Total length:		42:06

== Personnel ==
Musicians

- Richard Hawley – lead vocals (all tracks), bass (track 4)
- Colin Elliot – bass (tracks 1–3, 7, 9–11), backing vocals (2, 3, 5, 8, 12), percussion (2–4, 10, 11), piano (2, 3), double bass (6, 12), keyboards (10)
- Dean Beresford – drums (tracks 1–4, 6, 7, 9–11)
- Mark Sheridan – backing vocals (tracks 2, 3, 5, 8, 10, 12), acoustic guitar (9)
- Paul Brennan – cello (tracks 3, 4, 10, 12)
- Martin Schäfer – viola (tracks 3, 4, 10, 12)
- Steven Proctor – violin (tracks 3, 4, 10, 12)
- Zoe Colman – violin (tracks 3, 4, 10, 12)
- Liz Hanks – cello (tracks 3, 4, 10)
- Ali Vennart – viola (tracks 3, 4, 10)
- Liz Rossi – violin (tracks 3, 4, 10)
- Susannah Simmons – violin (tracks 3, 4, 10)
- Jarvis Cocker – backing vocals (track 10)

Technical

- Richard Hawley – production
- Colin Elliot – production, engineering (all tracks); strings arrangement (tracks 3, 4, 10, 12)
- Mark Sheridan – production (all tracks), engineering (tracks 1, 4, 6, 8, 10, 11)
- Duncan Cowell – engineering

== Charts ==
Chart performance for In This City They Call You Love
Chart (2024)	Peak position
Croatian International Albums (HDU)	27
Belgian Albums (Ultratop Flanders)	12
Belgian Albums (Ultratop Wallonia)	37
Irish Albums (OCC)	44
Scottish Albums (OCC)	5
Swiss Albums (Schweizer Hitparade)	62
UK Albums (OCC)	5
UK Independent Albums (OCC)	2
