= Truelove's Gutter =

Studio album by Richard Hawley
- Released: 21 September 2009
- Studios: Yellow Arch Studios, Sheffield
- Genres: Alternative pop, chamber pop
- Length: 51:05
- Label: Mute
- Producers: Richard Hawley and Colin Elliot

Richard Hawley chronology
Lady's Bridge (2007)	Truelove's Gutter (2009)	Standing at the Sky's Edge (2012)

Singles from Truelove's Gutter
- 1. "For Your Lover Give Some Time" Released: 10 August 2009; 2. "Open Up Your Door" Released: 30 November 2009

Truelove's Gutter is the sixth studio album from musician Richard Hawley, released on 21 September 2009 in the UK and on 22 September 2009 in the US. The album title refers to an ancient street in Hawley's native Sheffield, now thought to be the location of present-day Castle Street, which was allegedly named after 18th-century innkeeper Thomas Truelove, who used to charge local people to dump their rubbish in the gutter in the street that then flowed down to the River Don. Thematically, Truelove's Gutter is Hawley's darkest album to date. Hawley told the BBC that the album was inspired by particularly dark periods in his life and those of others. The album features some uncommon instrumentation, such as the waterphone, megabass, and cristal baschet.

The first single, "For Your Lover Give Some Time," was released as a three-track digital download on 10 August 2009. A second single, "Open Up Your Door", was released on 30 November 2009, also as a three-track digital download. "Remorse Code" was issued as the album's de facto third single on the EP False Lights from the Land on 7 June 2010.

== Critical reception ==
Professional ratings
Aggregate scores
Source	Rating
AnyDecentMusic?	7.1/10
Metacritic	79/100
Review scores
Source	Rating
AllMusic	4.5/5 stars
The Daily Telegraph	4/5 stars
The Guardian	4/5 stars
The Irish Times	4/5 stars
Mojo	4/5 stars
Pitchfork	6.7/10
Q	4/5 stars
Spin	6/10
The Times	4/5 stars
Uncut	3/5 stars

The album was mostly well received by the critics. AllMusic said "The album is more sparse than anything he's released. Its eight songs have a decidedly late-night feel. The grand sweeping orchestral strings of his last two albums have been replaced by a chamber section and odd instrumentation... that add real intimacy to the proceedings... Truelove's Gutter is a singular moment in Hawley's catalog that displays the maturity of all his gifts. It is quietly passionate, graceful, elegant, utterly moving, and unequivocally beautiful in its honesty and sophistication." BBC Music described the album as "a classic flawed masterpiece... Repeated plays reveal some truly sumptuous treasures... His strengths and weakness as a lyricist are laid bare by the sparse, moody atmospheres" but "aside from this, it's the sheer beauty and unity of feel that make this a more than worthy addition to the Hawley discography". The Daily Telegraph believed Hawley "has a strong claim to be the country's most accomplished songwriter" and described the tracks as "grown-up love songs – elevated by hope but weighed down by experience – and they sound all the more beautiful for it". Uncut said "Throughout, his mellowness of tone is the album’s defining feature... Miraculously, thanks to the minutiae of the arrangements, it’s a sound that never becomes one dimensional". Awarding the album eight out of ten, PopMatters called Truelove's Gutter "a beautiful and deceptively simple album" and said "this is a highly recommended album by an artist who seems to keep getting better. From what initially seemed like a limited palette, Richard Hawley has produced a masterpiece of tonal space that demands full concentration." MusicOMH was similarly enthralled, saying "Just looking at the sleeve it's possible to deduce that within lies a much darker, more minimal sound relative to its predecessors... This minimal approach is matched by the sound of the album which rarely breaks its spell of intoxicating intimacy... Truelove's Gutter is yet another showcase for Hawley's subtle genius. Every sound on the album, from the notes to the vocals, is warming and rich with sensations. Six studio albums into his late-starting solo career and Hawley's light shows no signs of dwindling."

While generally positive about the album, The Guardian felt that "it's hard to escape a niggling feeling that Hawley is here polishing a formula, even falling back on cliche, in his continuing quest to make the local and homely sound lushly romantic". Spin was unimpressed, saying Truelove's Gutter "has moments of heartbreaking beauty. Too bad those moments are outnumbered by a reliance on secondhand lyrical conceits and drifting arrangements." Pitchfork said "The gorgeous, backward-looking beauty of past releases like Coles Corner... has shifted toward something more dark, ambient, and withdrawn. It may be too slow for many, but it's more measured than it is mundane... Hawley can sound too stripped down this time out, and the two songs that hover near the 10-minute mark overplay the appeal of minimal compositions and Hawley's sweet croon" but ultimately "Hawley's mined a specific vein of emotion for years, and it's a testament to his skill that his hyper-local focus maintains such a broad appeal". Drowned in Sound noted the bleakness of the record, saying that Hawley "lends his uniquely melancholic voice to a uniquely melancholic album, even by his standards... Truelove's Gutter isn't all blackness, but even at its few hopeful moments there are those tinges of pessimism and cynicism that prevent it from ever being rose coloured. As a whole it's a musically and lyrically a beautiful reflection on the less than smooth course life can take."

== Track listing ==
All tracks written by Richard Hawley.

1. "As the Dawn Breaks" – 4:35
  - Richard Hawley – vocals, Atkin acoustic parlour guitar
  - Shez Sheridan – mandola
  - Thomas Bloch – cristal baschet, glass harmonica
  - Colin Elliot – string organ
2. "Open Up Your Door" – 4:42
  - Richard Hawley – vocals, Gretsch Country Gentleman, Fender Musicmaster, Gibson ES-335, Danelectro baritone guitar, DeArmond "shadowtone" pedal
  - Dean Beresford – drums
  - Colin Elliot – Fender bass, glockenspiel
  - Shez Sheridan – Spanish guitar, 12-string acoustic guitar, lap steel guitar, vibraphone
  - Jon Trier – piano
  - The Red Skies – string section
3. "Ashes on the Fire" – 4:24
  - Richard Hawley – vocals, Gretsch 6196, Atkin acoustic parlour guitar, Baldwin 12-string electric guitar
  - Dean Beresford – drums
  - Colin Elliot – Fender bass, piano, celeste
  - Shez Sheridan – harmony vocals, Spanish guitar, Gretsch "48" synchromatic acoustic guitar, Tremolo mandolas, 12-string guitars
4. "Remorse Code" – 9:51
  - Richard Hawley – vocals, Atkin acoustic parlour guitar, Atkin jumbo guitar, Gretsch 6196, Burns Nu-Sonic, cymbals
  - Dean Beresford – drums
  - Colin Elliot – Fender bass, the enchanted lyre
  - Shez Sheridan – tenor guitar, e-bow lap steel, feedback 12-string drones, dulcimer, Fisherman's lyre
  - Jon Trier – pipe organ
5. "Don't Get Hung Up in Your Soul" – 4:16
  - Richard Hawley – vocals, Atkin acoustic parlour guitar
  - David Coulter – musical saw
  - Colin Elliot – double bass
  - Shez Sheridan – Alpine concert zither
6. "Soldier On" – 6:50
  - Richard Hawley – vocals, Atkin acoustic parlour guitar, Atkin jumbo guitar, Gretsch clipper, Gretsch 12-string, Fender Jaguar, Fender Telecaster, Danelectro baritone, Gibson 120T
  - Dean Beresford – drums
  - Thomas Bloch – Ondes Martenot
  - Colin Elliot – Fender bass, double bass feedback, wind chimes, vibes, gong
  - Shez Sheridan – lap steel
  - The Red Skies – string section
7. "For Your Lover Give Some Time" – 5:38
  - Richard Hawley – vocals
  - Colin Elliot – harpsichord, organ, celeste
  - Donald Grant – solo violin
  - Liz Hanks – solo cello
  - Shez Sheridan – Spanish guitar, Fisherman's lyre
  - The Red Skies – string section
8. "Don't You Cry" – 10:42
  - Richard Hawley – vocals, Atkin acoustic parlour guitar, Gretsch 6120w, Gretsch G6118T-LTV 125th, snare drum
  - Dean Beresford – drums and cymbals
  - Thomas Bloch – cristal baschet, glass harmonica, waterphone
  - David Coulter – musical saw, waterphone
  - Colin Elliot – Fender bass, hi-hat, harpsichord, glockenspiel, organ, synthesizer, steel drum, sleigh bells, Tibetan singing bowls, backing vocals
  - Shez Sheridan – acoustic 12-string guitar, Fisherman's lyre, Gretsch electric 12-string guitar, Baldwin electric 12-string guitar, Selmer lap steel, backing vocals
  - Jon Trier – celeste

== Singles ==
- "For Your Lover Give Some Time" (10 August 2009)
  - Digital download
  1. "For Your Lover Give Some Time"
  2. "Sorry I Lost My Way"
  3. "Born Under a Bad Sign" (Instrumental)
- "Open Up Your Door" (30 November 2009)
  - Digital download
  1. "Open Up Your Door"
  2. "Don't Get Hung Up in Your Soul" (Janice Long BBC Radio 2 Session)
  3. "Run for Me" (Marc Riley BBC Radio 6 Music Session)
- False Lights from the Land EP (7 June 2010)
  - 10" vinyl (also includes CD copy of EP)
  1. "Remorse Code"
  2. "Shallow Brown"
  3. "The Ellan Vannin Tragedy"
  4. "There's a Storm a-Comin'"

== Production credits ==
- Produced by Richard Hawley and Colin Elliot at Yellow Arch Studios, Sheffield
- Engineering and orchestral arrangements by Colin Elliot
- Red Skies string section recorded in Axis Studios, Sheffield; engineered by Mike Timm
- The Red Skies string section:
  - Violins – Donald Grant, Helena Smart, Catrin Morgan, Emma Wragg, Thea Spiers, Kirsty Mangan
  - Violas – Felix Tanner, Natalie Holt
  - Cellos – Lucy Payne, Liz Hanks
  - Double bass on "For Your Lover, Give Some Time" – Richard Pryce
- Mastered by Duncan Cowell at Soundmastering, London
- Sleeve design by Nick Phillips
- Cover and cloud photography by Steve Gullick
- Lyric photography by Julian Holtom

== Certifications ==
Region	Certification	Certified units/sales
United Kingdom (BPI)	Silver	60,000^{^}
^{^} Shipments figures based on certification alone.
