= Hollow Meadows (album) =

Studio album by Richard Hawley
- Released: 11 September 2015
- Genres: Chamber pop, indie rock, alternative rock, folk
- Length: 49:00
- Labels: Parlophone, Warner Bros.
- Producers: Shez Sheridan, Richard Hawley

Richard Hawley chronology
Standing at the Sky's Edge (2012)	Hollow Meadows (2015)	Further (2019)

Singles from Hollow Meadows
- 1. "Heart of Oak" Released: 4 September 2015; 2. "I Still Want You" Released: 6 October 2015

Professional ratings
Aggregate scores
Source	Rating
Metacritic	79/100
Review scores
Source	Rating
AllMusic	4/5 stars
The Line of Best Fit	8/10 stars
NME	8/10 stars
WaxonTape	9/10 stars

Hollow Meadows is the eighth solo album by British singer-songwriter Richard Hawley, released on 11 September 2015. It is his second record on the Parlophone label. As with his previous albums, the title refers to an area of his native Sheffield; Hollow Meadows is a hamlet on the outskirts of the city.

== Development ==
After promotion had completed on his previous record Standing at the Sky's Edge, Hawley worked on the soundtrack for the film Love is All. Hawley wrote much of the album while recovering from a broken leg and slipped disc. Hawley referred to the song "Sometimes I Feel" as a turning point during the album's sessions. Much of what ended up on the album are the raw demos, which Hawley says helped keep the record "small." The vocal tracks sound particularly weary and ragged in comparison to previous albums, Hawley's usual smooth baritone frequently breaking.

== Track listing ==
All tracks are written by Richard Hawley, except where noted.

No.	Title	Writer(s)	Length
1.	"I Still Want You"	Hawley, Shez Sheridan	4:07
2.	"The World Looks Down"		3:34
3.	"Which Way"		2:58
4.	"Serenade of Blue"		4:08
5.	"Long Time Down"		5:39
6.	"Nothing Like a Friend"		5:04
7.	"Sometimes I Feel"		5:35
8.	"Tuesday pm"		3:30
9.	"Welcome the Sun"		6:17
10.	"Heart of Oak"		4:27
11.	"What Love Means"	Hawley, Sheridan	3:41

== Charts ==
=== Weekly charts ===
Chart (2015)	Peak position
Belgian Albums (Ultratop Flanders)	3
Belgian Albums (Ultratop Wallonia)	23
French Albums (SNEP)	42
Dutch Albums (Album Top 100)	26
Spanish Albums (Promusicae)	33
UK Albums (Official Charts)	9

=== Year-end charts ===
Chart (2015)	Position
Belgian Albums (Ultratop Flanders)	110
