= Further (Richard Hawley album) =

Studio album by Richard Hawley
- Released: 31 May 2019
- Length: 35:50
- Label: BMG Rights Management
- Producers: Collin Elliot; Shez Sheridan

Richard Hawley chronology
Hollow Meadows (2015)	Further (2019)	In This City They Call You Love (2024)

Singles from Further
- 1. "Off My Mind" Released: 6 March 2019; 2. "My Little Treasures" Released: 12 April 2019; 3. "Alone" Released: 19 April 2019

Further is the ninth studio album by English singer-songwriter Richard Hawley. It was released on 31 May 2019 by BMG Rights Management. The album is the first by Hawley not to be named after a location or landmark in his local city of Sheffield.

== Critical reception ==
Professional ratings
Aggregate scores
Source	Rating
AnyDecentMusic?	7.2/10
Metacritic	81/100
Review scores
Source	Rating
The Guardian	4/5 stars
Mojo	4/5 stars
Q	4/5 stars
Record Collector	4/5 stars
Uncut	4/5 stars

Reviews of Further were generally positive. Guy Oddy of The Arts Desk described the record as "Roy Orbison fronting Phil Spector's famous Wall of Sound", and stated that "while Richard Hawley has little to say about the stuff that causes a stir in the media, there is plenty about the things that everyone comes across while drifting into middle age and realising that youthful vitality is no longer powering life – and that’s pretty universal". The Guardian's Dave Simpson observed that Hawley "seems to forever find unexpected new themes to inspire him" and that "Hawley certainly isn't tearing up the blueprint, but within the boundaries of his domain, nobody does it better".

== Track listing ==
All tracks are written by Richard Hawley; "Not Lonely" co-written by Mark Sheridan.

Further track listing
No.	Title	Length
1.	"Off My Mind"	2:41
2.	"Alone"	2:48
3.	"My Little Treasures"	3:26
4.	"Further"	3:35
5.	"Emilina Says"	3:03
6.	"Is There a Pill?"	3:21
7.	"Galley Girl"	3:05
8.	"Not Lonely"	3:04
9.	"Time Is"	4:01
10.	"Midnight Train"	3:37
11.	"Doors"	2:58
Total length:		35:50

== Charts ==
Chart performance for Further
Chart (2019)	Peak position
Belgian Albums (Ultratop Flanders)	20
Belgian Albums (Ultratop Wallonia)	126
French Albums (SNEP)	103
Irish Albums (IRMA)	18
Scottish Albums (Official Charts)	3
Spanish Albums (Promusicae)	38
UK Albums (Official Charts)	3
