= Coles Corner =

Street corner in Sheffield, England

Coordinates: 53.3824°N 1.4687°W

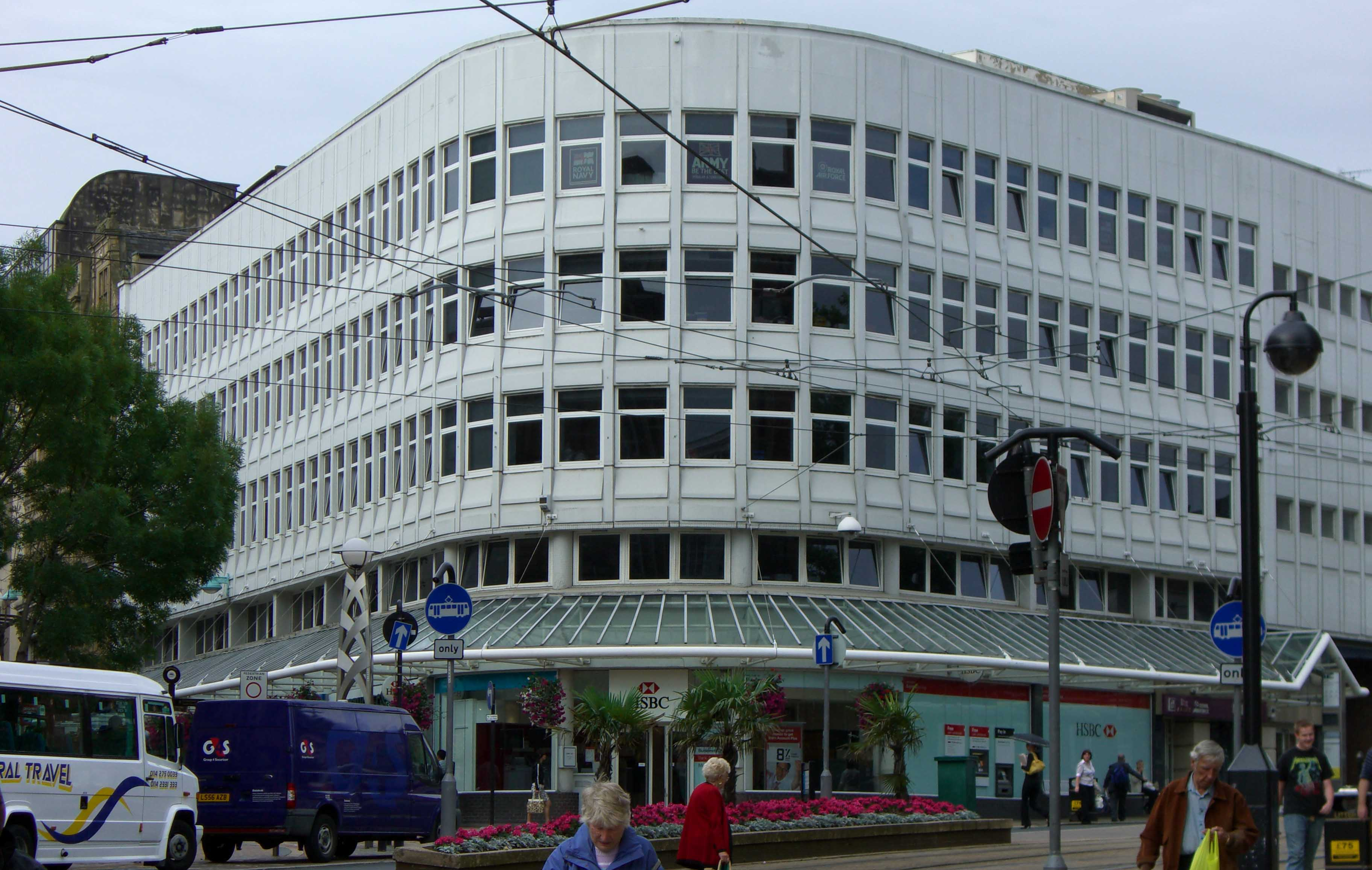
Modern day Coles Corner

Coles Corner is the name given to the corner of Fargate and Church Street in Sheffield, England, in sight of the cathedral. It was the site of the old Cole Brothers department store until it moved to Barker's Pool in 1963.

The modern building was built on the site of Coles Corner and has been occupied by Midland Bank and various retailers over the years, including HSBC, Starbucks Coffee, Vodafone, The Carphone Warehouse, Pret, and most recently Burger King. The top floor has also been occupied by an Armed Forces Careers Office (AFCO), staffed by personnel from all three services of the British Armed Forces.

The corner is famous in Sheffield as a place to meet for a first date. A plaque put up by the Rotary Club now marks the spot and ensures its local history is not forgotten.

A song and album by Sheffield singer Richard Hawley were named after the place.
