= Hoggboy =

English indie rock band

- Origin: Sheffield, England
- Genres: Garage rock, indie rock
- Years active: 2001–2005
- Labels: Sobriety Records
- Past members: Tom Hogg; Hugh Smith; Andrew Bailey; Richy Westley
- Website: www.myspace.com/hoggboymusic

Hoggboy were an English indie rock band, formed in 2001 in Sheffield, England. The band was composed of frontman Tom Hogg, guitarist Hugh Smith, bassist Andrew Bailey and drummer Richy Westley. They released two studio albums before splitting up in 2005. Hogg and Bailey went on to form The Hosts.

== History ==
Formed in 2001 by Sheffield music stalwart, former Seafruit and Chicken Legs Weaver guitarist Tom Hogg, the band set up their own record company "Sobriety Records" and released two albums, the Richard Hawley and Chris Thomas produced debut Or 8? and "Seven Miles Of Love", both of which spawned five singles.

The band received early plaudits from the likes of the NME who described the band as "gloriously cocky and casually brilliant, Hoggboy will steal your heart", Kerrang!, Channel 4 and BBC Radio 1 DJ Steve Lamacq who commented ""I was sent 1 track by this group, then I went to see them live last Saturday and my jaw just hit the floor to be honest. To me, it's like some really old school Sheffield sleaze & arrogance mixed together with an air of American rock'n'roll", and supported bands including The Strokes and The White Stripes before the band found themselves "the official scapegoat of the inevitable garage-rock backlash in England", with one Japan Times journalist suggesting the band were perhaps an easy scapegoat as Hogg came across in interviews as "an insufferable piss-taker who couldn't give a damn whether the British music press likes him or not".

The band split up in 2005 after three years together, with Tom Hogg and bassist Andrew 'Fingers' Bailey going on to form The Hosts in 2007. The Hosts have supported and continued to work with Richard Hawley, who expected the band do great things and described Hoggboy as a "great lost Sheffield band" who he really believed in. Drummer Richy Westley joined Reverend and The Makers before leaving to form Strange And Partner in 2009, who also featured guitarist Hugh Smith until he re-located to Edinburgh.

== Discography ==
=== Singles ===
- "So Young" / "Call Me Suck" (2002)
- "Shouldn't Let the Side Down" (2002) UK #74
- "Upside Down" (2002)
- "Believe" (2004)
- "400 Boys" (2005)

=== Albums ===
- Or 8? (2002)
- Seven Miles Of Love (2004)
