= Lady's Bridge (album) =

Studio album by Richard Hawley
- Released: 20 August 2007
- Recorded: Yellow Arch Studios and Axis Studios, Sheffield
- Genres: Alternative pop, chamber pop
- Length: 48:24
- Label: Mute
- Producers: Richard Hawley, Colin Elliot, Mike Timm

Richard Hawley chronology
Coles Corner (2005)	Lady's Bridge (2007)	Truelove's Gutter (2009)

Singles from Lady's Bridge
- 1. "Tonight the Streets Are Ours" Released: 6 August 2007; 2. "Serious" Released: 15 October 2007; 3. "Valentine" Released: 28 January 2008

Lady's Bridge is the fifth studio album from musician Richard Hawley, released on 20 August 2007 in the UK and on 9 October 2007 in the US. The album follows his 2005 Mercury Music Prize-nominated album Coles Corner. It is named after the landmark location of Lady's Bridge in Hawley's hometown of Sheffield, an old bridge over the River Don that historically connected the rich and poor parts of the town. Hawley told Uncut magazine that "the title is a metaphor too; it's about leaving the past behind". The cover features a photograph, taken by Martin Parr, of Hawley and his guitar at the Club 60 music venue in Sheffield as a tribute to his father Dave who had died of lung cancer earlier that year: Dave Hawley had been a blues guitarist at the club in his youth, playing alongside Muddy Waters and John Lee Hooker.

The song "Dark Road" originally appeared as a B-side to Hawley's "Born Under a Bad Sign" single. "Roll River Roll" is used as the theme song for the dark British sitcom Getting On. A special edition of the album with a bonus DVD was also released.

The album was certified gold for sales of 100,000 copies in the UK on 11 June 2010.

== Critical reception ==
Professional ratings
Review scores
Source	Rating
AllMusic	4/5 stars
BBC Music	very favourable
Drowned in Sound	8/10
The Guardian	4/5 stars
MusicOMH	4/5 stars
NME	8/10
Pitchfork	5.8/10
Uncut	4/5 stars

Lady's Bridge was very favourably received by most critics. AllMusic said the album was "as moving, tender, and literate as its predecessor, without the least bit of formula or pretension applied... Ultimately, Lady's Bridge is a sad kind of record that doesn't leave one depressed... [it] proves that Cole's Corner (sic) was no one-off, and dare it be said, this surpasses the previous album in diversity, depth, and elegance without ever sounding false". BBC Music said that "Lady's Bridge is an utterly lovely, timeless album that Hawley can be proud of, and deserves to further his cause in becoming a proper national treasure". Drowned in Sound was similarly won over, stating that "as a follow-up to a wonderful record in Coles Corner, then, Hawley's latest set more than holds up. It's arguably his most varied collection yet... Nobody was expecting a bad record, but a few people might be surprised by the exceptional pedigree of Richard Hawley's fifth full-length." The Guardian said "this fifth album of easy south Yorkshire nostalgia - stuck in a lush, late-50s groove of twinkly pianos and Disney strings - should rankle. Magically, it doesn't... This is music to connect the generations: beautiful, moving pop at its best." NME stated that "Lady's Bridge is an album that has moments that won't be bettered this year or any other... At worst, some might accuse it of being clever pastiche. But pastiche is hollow, whereas Hawley's the real deal: his heart is all there. Uncut said that the album "sounds as if it has been decanted from a time when disc jockeys wore dinner jackets, and a gentleman in trouble might soothe his troubled heart with a stroll along the banks of the canal. Not that Hawley needs to change. While he still sings like a kinder, sadder Jarvis Cocker would, perhaps after an encounter with his karaoke uncle, he does it with such sincerity that it seems churlish to resist." MusicOMH considered the album to be "a continuation of the Mercury-nominated Coles Corner - lush orchestration, melancholic, wistful ballads - but with an added edge... its this pleasing variety to the songs that make this Hawley's strongest album to date..." and concluding that "Lady's Bridge is a wonderful album that will only confirm and enhance that burgeoning reputation".

Pitchfork was a dissenting voice, believing that "following Coles Corner, it's... a little harder to be totally taken in by [this album]... It begins to feel less like appropriation than note-perfect recreation... There's been no journey, no emotional progress, and little emotional payoff. For an album and artist so otherwise focused, the effect winds up more soporific than satisfying, however stylish and serene."

== In popular culture ==
"Tonight the Streets Are Ours" was featured in both the opening titles of the film Exit Through The Gift Shop and The Simpsons episode "Exit Through the Kwik-E-Mart". It also appeared in the final episode of the 2024 Netflix series Baby Reindeer.

== Track listing ==
All tracks written and composed by Richard Hawley.

1. "Valentine" – 4:27
2. "Roll River Roll" – 5:11
3. "Serious" – 3:24
4. "Tonight the Streets Are Ours" – 3:40
5. "Lady Solitude" – 5:32
6. "Dark Road" – 3:58
7. "The Sea Calls" – 5:54
8. "Lady's Bridge" – 4:00
9. "I'm Looking for Someone to Find Me" – 3:18
10. "Our Darkness" – 4:08
11. "The Sun Refused to Shine" – 4:57

=== Special edition bonus DVD ===
1. "Now Then: A Short Film" – 34:30
2. "Tonight the Streets Are Ours" (video) – 3:42

== Singles ==
- "Tonight the Streets Are Ours" (6 August 2007) - # 40 UK
  - CD1 (CD MUTE 382) b/w: "Vickers Road"
  - CD2 (LCD MUTE 382) b/w: "I Sleep Alone" (Live at Sheffield City Hall) / "Coming Home" (Live at Sheffield City Hall)
  - 7" vinyl (MUTE 382) b/w: "Vickers Road"
- "Serious" (15 October 2007) - # 83 UK
  - CD1 (CD MUTE 385) b/w: "Poor Boy"
  - CD2 (LCD MUTE 385) b/w: "Water Boy" / "Let It Come Slowly Towards You" / "Serious" (enhanced video)
  - 7" vinyl (MUTE 385) b/w: "Poor Boy"
- "Valentine" (28 January 2008) - # 134 UK
  - CD (CD MUTE 388) b/w: "Sheffield on Sea" / "Roll River Roll" (Acoustic) / "Valentine" (enhanced video)
  - 7" vinyl (MUTE 388) b/w: "Lonesome Town"
- Lady's Bridge EP (26 May 2008)
  - Digital download: "Lady's Bridge" / "The Sea Calls" (Live in Sheffield) / "Roll River Roll" (Live in Sheffield) / "Rockabilly Radio"

== Personnel ==
- Dean Beresford – drums on tracks 1 to 5, tracks 7 to 10
- Ellen Brookes – violin on tracks 1 and 9; viola on tracks 2 and 4
- Sally Doherty – vocals on tracks 4 and 11
- Colin Elliot – electric bass on tracks 1, 4, 5, 7, 10 and 11; double bass on tracks 2, 6, 8 and 9; piano on tracks 1 and 4; Rhodes electric piano on tracks 8 and 11; timpani on tracks 1 and 10; cymbal on tracks 4 and 10; tambourine on track 4; castanets on track 4; percussion on tracks 6, 7, 8 and 9; accordion on track 7; theremin on track 7; vibraphone on tracks 7 and 11; congas on tracks 8 and 9; drums on track 11; tom tom on track 11; backing vocals on tracks 1 and 9
- Jen Fawcett – flugelhorn on track 10
- Liz Garside – cello on tracks 1, 2, 4 and 10
- Trevor Goodison – tenor horns on track 10
- Liz Hanks – cello on tracks 1, 2, 4 and 10
- Richard Hawley – lead vocals, acoustic guitar, electric guitars on tracks 1, 3, 4, 7, 8 and 9; Spanish guitar on track 1; lap steel guitar on tracks 7, 8, 9 and 11; backward tremolo guitar on track 10; echo feedback guitar on track 11; bongos on track 6; snare drum on track 6; piano on track 7; vibraphone on track 7; dulcimer on track 7; glockenspiel on tracks 8 and 9; Rhodes electric piano on track 8; cymbal on tracks 8 and 11; lyre on track 8; bass drum on track 11
- Dave Keighley – tenor trombone on track 10
- Naomi Koop – violin on tracks 1 and 9; viola on tracks 2 and 4
- Lizz Lipscombe – violin on tracks 1, 2, 4 and 9
- Clive Mellor – harmonica on track 11
- Charlotte Miles – violin on tracks 1, 2, 4 and 9
- Clare Moore – euphonium on track 10
- Kathleen Ord – violin on tracks 1, 2, 4 and 9
- Rebecca Penn-Critten, Sophia Penn-Critten, Tasmin Penn-Critten – backing vocals on track 3
- John Pullen – E flat bass trumpet on track 10
- Eleanor Radford – cornet on track 10
- Isobel Radford – baritone horns on track 10
- Shez Sheridan – acoustic guitar on tracks 1, 4, 8, 9, 10 and 11; electric guitars on tracks 1, 2, 4, 9, 10 and 11; Spanish guitar on track 7; lyre on tracks 1, 7 and 8; banjo on track 7; lap steel guitar on tracks 8 and 11; backing vocals on track 9
- Susannah Simmons – violin on tracks 1, 2, 4 and 9
- Nick Stokes – bass trombone on track 10
- Jon Trier – piano on tracks 2, 7, 8 and 10; bells on track 4; glockenspiel on track 4; harmonium on track 7; celeste on track 9; Rhodes electric piano on tracks 10 and 11; vibraphone on track 11
- Johnny Wood – double bass on track 3
- The Stocksbridge Brass Band – backing band on track 10

== Certifications ==
Region	Certification	Certified units/sales
United Kingdom (BPI)	Gold	100,000^{^}
^{^} Shipments figures based on certification alone.
