= A Girl Called Eddy =

American singer-songwriter

Erin Moran, known professionally as A Girl Called Eddy, is an American singer and songwriter born in Neptune, New Jersey, U.S. and currently living in England.

Along with Stephen Harris and DJ Sae 1, she was a member of the trip hop act Leomoon who released an eponymous album in 1999.

== Career ==
She is currently signed to Anti Records. She also made an appearance in 2001 on a promotional CD for the Nissan Altima with the track "The Soundtrack of Your Life". In 2001, she released an EP titled, Tears All Over Town on Le Grand Magistery, an independent record label. She started singing background vocals and keyboard playing for Francis Dunnery, a singer-songwriter, providing back-up vocals on his album Man, and toured England. She also toured Europe supporting Josh Ritter.

In August 2004, she released her first, self-titled album in England, working with Richard Hawley.

In 2008, she featured on a free CD with the music magazine Mojo, contributing a version of the Beatles' "Julia" on Mojo Presents the White Album Uncovered CD1.

Moran's influences include Burt Bacharach ("all my life I've been a massive Burt Bacharach fan"), Karen Carpenter, Scott Walker, Carole King, and Paul McCartney.

Moran has been compared with her contemporaries, including Aimee Mann, Beth Orton, and Sarah McLachlan.

In April 2014, The Recoup posted an interview with Erin Moran, where she stated that she was working on a new album.

A record, The Last Detail, with musician Mehdi Zannad, who records as FUGU, was released on November 2, 2018, on Spanish indie label Elefant Records. Moran has stated on Instagram that her second solo record will be released in 2019.

On November 1, 2019, she released a new single "Been Around" from her first album in 15 years, Been Around, released on January 17, 2020.

== Discography ==
=== Albums ===
- Leomoon by Leomoon (1999)
- A Girl Called Eddy (2004)
- The Last Detail (2018)
- Been Around (2020)

Many favorable reviews and listed as Top 10 of 2004 by The Wall Street Journal.

=== Extended plays ===
- Tears All Over Town (2001)
- Somebody Hurt You (2004)
- The Long Goodbye (2004)
