= Late Night Final =

Studio album by Richard Hawley
- Released: 15 October 2001
- Genre: Chamber pop
- Length: 41:24
- Labels: Setanta Records (UK & Europe), Bar/None Records (US)
- Producers: Richard Hawley, Alan Smyth, Colin Elliot

Richard Hawley chronology
Richard Hawley (2001)	Late Night Final (2001)	Lowedges (2003)

Singles from Late Night Final
- 1. "Baby, You're My Light" Released: 4 February 2002

Late Night Final is the second studio album (and first full-length album after the mini-album Richard Hawley released six months earlier) from musician Richard Hawley, released in the UK in October 2001 by Setanta Records. Named after the cry of vendors selling the Sheffield Star evening newspaper on the streets of his home city, it was released to positive reviews. A single, "Baby, You're My Light" was released from the album in February 2002, reaching #81 in the UK Singles Chart.

Scottish band Camera Obscura later covered "The Nights Are Cold" and released it as a single in May 2010. In turn, Hawley remixed their song "The Sweetest Thing" for the single's B-side.

A short clip of the song "Long Black Train" was used in the 2005 film V for Vendetta, but did not feature on the accompanying soundtrack album. The single "Baby, You're My Light" was included in the 2008 film' soundtrack, Nick & Norah's Infinite Playlist.

The album's front cover and inner artwork feature photographs taken in the Castle Market indoor market in Sheffield.

== Release history ==
Country	Date	Format	Label
UK & Europe	15 October 2001	LP, CD	Setanta Records
US	22 January 2002	LP, CD	Bar/None Records
Worldwide (reissue)	2 January 2006	CD	V2 Records

== Reception ==
Professional ratings
Review scores
Source	Rating
AllMusic	4/5 stars
MusicOMH	very favourable
Rock Sound	2/5 stars

AllMusic said that "Richard Hawley creates an album brooding with creativity and charm. With dreamy and ethereal instrumental works throughout, Hawley paints the town psychedelic with spirit and fervent passion. From beginning to end, this Bar None release is chock-full of reflective lyrical statements and stunning, pristine guitar and percussive statements... a fine journey by a singer/songwriter with budding potential". MusicOMH said "It's a terrific showcase for the voice that is rightly being lauded wherever he goes... You need this album almost as much as you needed the first one."

== Track listing ==
All songs written and composed by Richard Hawley.

1. "Something Is...!" – 3:43
2. "Baby, You're My Light" – 2:56
3. "Love of My Life" – 3:21
4. "The Nights Are Cold" – 2:50
5. "Can You Hear the Rain, Love?" – 4:56
6. "Lonely Night" – 2:46
7. "Precious Sight" – 4:16
8. "No Way Home" – 4:15
9. "Cry a Tear for the Man in the Moon" – 3:27
10. "Long Black Train" – 4:14
11. "The Light at the End of the Tunnel (Was a Train Coming the Other Way)" – 4:54

== Personnel ==
- Richard Hawley – vocals, guitar, organ, harmonica, piano, drums, glockenspiel, Hawaiian lap steel guitar
- Saskia Cocker – backing vocals on track 11
- Andy Cook – drums on tracks 1 to 5, track 10
- Colin Elliot – electric bass, upright bass & percussion on tracks 1 to 5, track 10
- Liz Hanks – cello on track 1
- Liz Lipscombe – violin on track 1
- Shez Sheridan – guitar & lap steel guitar on tracks 1 to 4, track 10
- Simon Stafford – keyboards on tracks 1 to 3, track 5, track 10
