= A Girl Called Eddy (album) =

Studio album by A Girl Called Eddy
- Released: August 2004
- Genres: Soul, indie
- Length: 50:37
- Label: ANTI-
- Producers: Richard Hawley & Colin Elliot

A Girl Called Eddy is the self-titled debut album from singer-songwriter A Girl Called Eddy.

== Reception ==
Professional ratings
Review scores
Source	Rating
AllMusic	4/5 stars
The Buffalo News	4/4 stars
Entertainment Weekly	B
The New York Times	favorable
Phoenix New Times	favorable
PopMatters	favorable
Uncut	4/4 stars

The album's release met with multiple favorable reviews and "earned her the No. 1 spot on Amazon.com's 2004 list of customer favorites". Named to Uncut magazine's 2004 Albums of the Year, The Village Voice's Pazz & Jop critic's list of 2004 albums, and The Wall Street Journal's Top 10 of 2004.

== Song use ==
The track "Somebody Hurt You" was used in series 3, episode 1 of the BBC animation show Monkey Dust to link two different sketches in the show. The juxtaposition of the light sounds of a song against the dark dystopian comedy of the program is a feature of Monkey Dust. The song "Heartache" was used in the Polish brothers' film For Lovers Only.

== Track listing ==
All tracks written by Erin Moran except where noted.

1. "Tears All Over Town" – 4:01
2. "Kathleen" – 4:47
3. "Girls Can Really Tear You Up Inside" – 4:48
4. "The Long Goodbye" (E. Moran, C. Shaw) – 3:58
5. "Somebody Hurt You" – 5:07
6. "People Used to Dream About the Future" – 5:33
7. "Heartache" – 4:34
8. "Life Thru the Same Lens" – 4:18
9. "Did You See the Moon Tonight?" – 3:44
10. "Little Bird" – 3:54
11. "Golden" – 5:53
