= Lowedges =

Studio album by Richard Hawley
- Released: 10 February 2003
- Genre: Chamber pop
- Length: 40:56
- Labels: Setanta Records (UK & Europe); XL Recordings (US)
- Producers: Richard Hawley, Colin Elliot

Richard Hawley chronology
Late Night Final (2001)	Lowedges (2003)	Coles Corner (2005)

Singles from Lowedges
- 1. "Run for Me" Released: 12 May 2003

Lowedges is the third studio album from musician Richard Hawley. It was released in the UK in February 2003 by Setanta Records. It is named after a district in Hawley's home city of Sheffield.

== Release history ==
Country	Date	Format	Label
UK & Europe	10 February 2003	LP, CD	Setanta Records
US	20 May 2003	LP, CD	XL Recordings
Japan	30 June 2003	CD	Imperial Records
Worldwide (reissue)	2 January 2006	CD	V2 Records

== Critical reception ==
Professional ratings
Review scores
Source	Rating
AllMusic	4/5 stars
BBC Music	very favourable
Drowned in Sound	9/10
The Guardian	4/5 stars
MusicOMH	average
PopMatters	very favourable
Q	4/5 stars

The album received very favourable reviews from most critics. Drowned in Sound called the album "sublime" and said "this album is up there with the Scott Walkers, Dylans and any other late night songsmith of the last fifty years. Solely, it is about the songs; eleven pure and sophisticated tales of love and lamentation." AllMusic said that Lowedges "retains all the virtues that made his debut long-player... such an out-of-left-field stunner: the late-night atmosphere, the subtle yet dramatic arrangements, Hawley's deep and expressive vocals, and, above all, the low-key and catchy songs that will have you remembering past loves, glory days, and autumn nights... He doesn't make a false step on this album. Most likely it will be overlooked by the masses, but that's OK. They don't deserve to be hip to such a wonderfully intimate and, well, wonderful artist and record." BBC Music described it as "melodic songwriting at its best and a pleasure to listen to". Q stated that Lowedges' "kitsch-free excellence confirms Hawley as a balladeer of the very highest order". PopMatters described Hawley as "a master at crafting melodies so simple, so memorable, it makes your heart melt" and said "rarely does feeling so hopeless and sad ever sound so enticing. Perfect for quiet, rainy nights, this album is easily one of 2003's finest buried treasures."

MusicOMH had some reservations, being "slightly disappointed" and saying "some of these songs could have been better developed... But there are lovely moments".

== Track listing ==
All songs written and composed by Richard Hawley, except where noted.

1. "Run for Me" – 4:07
2. "Darlin'" – 3:33
3. "Oh My Love" – 3:46
4. "The Only Road" – 5:42
5. "On the Ledge" – 3:20
6. "You Don't Miss Your Water (Till Your River Runs Dry)" (William Bell, Richard Hawley) – 4:56
7. "The Motorcycle Song" – 2:57
8. "It's over Love" – 2:46
9. "I'm on Nights" – 3:25
10. "Danny" – 3:50
11. "The Nights Are Made for Us" – 2:42

Bonus tracks (Japanese version)

12. "Sick Pay" – 4:41
13. "Cheap Spanish Whine" – 3:22

== Personnel ==
- Elizabeth Ball – violin
- Ali Heath Cook – backing vocals
- Andy Cook – drums
- Alice Coulam – backing vocals
- Colin Elliot – electric bass, upright bass, piano, Mellotron, glockenspiel, vibraphone, percussion, backing vocals
- Simon Graham – violin
- Liz Hanks - viola
- Richard Hawley – lead vocals, guitars, bass, drums, keyboards, glockenspiel, Fender Rhodes, Omnichord, Hawaiian lap steel guitar, lyre, vibraphone, percussion
- Rachel Jones – viola
- Naomi Koop – viola
- Shez Sheridan – guitars, drones, backing vocals
- Simon Stafford – keyboards
- John Visanji – violin
