= The Barbs =

Band

The Barbs was an indie rock band from Medway, Kent, England and New South Wales, Australia. Though never particularly successful in their home country, the band gained wider recognition in the Philippines in late 2004, with the single "Massive Crush". The UK release of the same record was Single of the Week on Lauren Laverne's XFM show, and was played on BBC Radio 2 several times. The single received critical acclaim, with 4 Ks from Kerrang! and was, according to the NME, "The best song about killing your parents, stealing guitars and humping till dawn ever penned".

They also released an album, Lupine Peroxide and The Importance Of Being Evil.

On 1 December 2004, they were one of the headline acts at the MTV Staying Alive Music Summit, playing to a crowd of over 50,000. They also made several tours of the UK with bands such as The Rocks.

Illustrator Emma Renton initially designed two of the Barbs' single covers. Later, Jim Connolly was commissioned to produce comic book-style artwork for their remaining sleeves.

The members of the band were Amy Casey, Jim Tucker, Simon Hartop and Tim Box. After the group broke up, guitarist Casey and guitarist/vocalist Box married and went on to form What Would Jesus Drive.

== External linkis ==
- The Barbs balks trends | The Manila Bulletin Newspaper Online
- About The Barbs | The Manila Bulletin Newspaper Online
