= Love Is All (2014 film) =

- Directed by: Kim Longinotto
- Produced by: Mark Atkin; Martin Rosenbaum; Crossover; Lone Star Productions
- Edited by: Ollie Huddleston
- Music by: Richard Hawley
- Release date: 11 June 2014 (UK)
- Running time: 70 minutes
- Country: United Kingdom

Love Is All is a 2014 documentary film exploring the depiction of love and courtship on film throughout the 20th century. It is composed of archive material from the BFI National Archive, Yorkshire Film Archive and other sources.

The film is directed by Kim Longinotto with an original soundtrack composed by Sheffield singer/songwriter Richard Hawley, formerly of Pulp. Hawley wrote new material for the film and contributed existing tracks.

From cinema’s very first kisses, through the disruption of war to the birth of youth culture, gay liberation and free love, the film follows courting couples flirting at tea dances, kissing in the back of the movies, couples living together and fighting for the right to love. The archive footage covers same-sex relationships, sexism, interracial relationships and sexual liberation.

"Graham Relton at the Yorkshire Film Archive was amazing," said Kim Longinotto. "I had a long conversation with him about the film and then a couple of weeks later he sent us an absolute feast of archive that was exactly what we needed. The clips he sent us were often very personal and affectionate and had been filmed by the families themselves. They were like early home movies but they were beautifully made. Jan Faull found so many unexpected gems in the BFI Archive for us too. One of my favorite moments is a little girl in a village school being crowned May Queen. Also Piccadilly is an amazing film. It stars Anna May Wong who I’d never even heard of. She is spectacular and the acting is mostly very understated and truthful."

"It was extraordinary to watch archive film coming to life with Richard Hawley’s intimate and emotional songs and often see a new meaning emerge. Richard’s music creates a new kind of reality and suddenly the people looking out at you from the past seem so contemporary and vivid."

The film was commissioned by BBC North, BBC Storyville and the BFI, and produced by Crossover and Lone Star. It was edited by Ollie Huddleston.

The premiere was at Chatsworth House in Derbyshire on Wednesday 11 June 2014 as part of Sheffield Doc/Fest.
