= A Heavy Nite With... =

Studio album by Relaxed Muscle
- Released: October 2003
- Genre: Electronica
- Label: Rough Trade

Professional ratings
Review scores
Source	Rating
AllMusic	3.5/5 stars
The Guardian	2/5 stars
The Independent	3/5 stars

A Heavy Nite With... is the debut album by British band Relaxed Muscle fronted by Pulp's Jarvis Cocker, using the pseudonym Darren Spooner. The other member is Jason Buckle. It has been alleged that Jason Buckle is a pseudonym for Pulp guitarist Richard Hawley, but this is not the case - Hawley does contribute guitar to the album, however, under the pseudonym Wayne Marsden.

Relaxed Muscle recorded three other songs not included on this album: "Branded" and "Year Of The Dog" as B-sides and "This Is As Good As It Gets," on the compilation album The Electronic Bible.

== Track listing ==
All tracks are written by Relaxed Muscle

No.	Title	Length
1.	"The Heavy"	3:55
2.	"3-Way Accumulator" (a/k/a "Let It Ride")	3:48
3.	"Beastmaster"	3:55
4.	"Billy Jack"	4:31
5.	"Rod Of Iron"	3:41
6.	"Tuff It Out"	3:33
7.	"Sexualized"	3:39
8.	"Muscle Music"	3:03
9.	"B-Real"	4:13
10.	"Previous"	2:46
11.	"Battered"	3:53
12.	"Mary"	4:42
13.	"Sexualized" (Music video)
14.	"Billy Jack" (Music video)

== Personnel ==
- Darren Spooner - Vox
- JP Buckle - Music
- Wayne Marsden - Extra Guitars ("Rod Of Iron" and "Battered")
