= Richard Hawley =

English musician (born 1967)

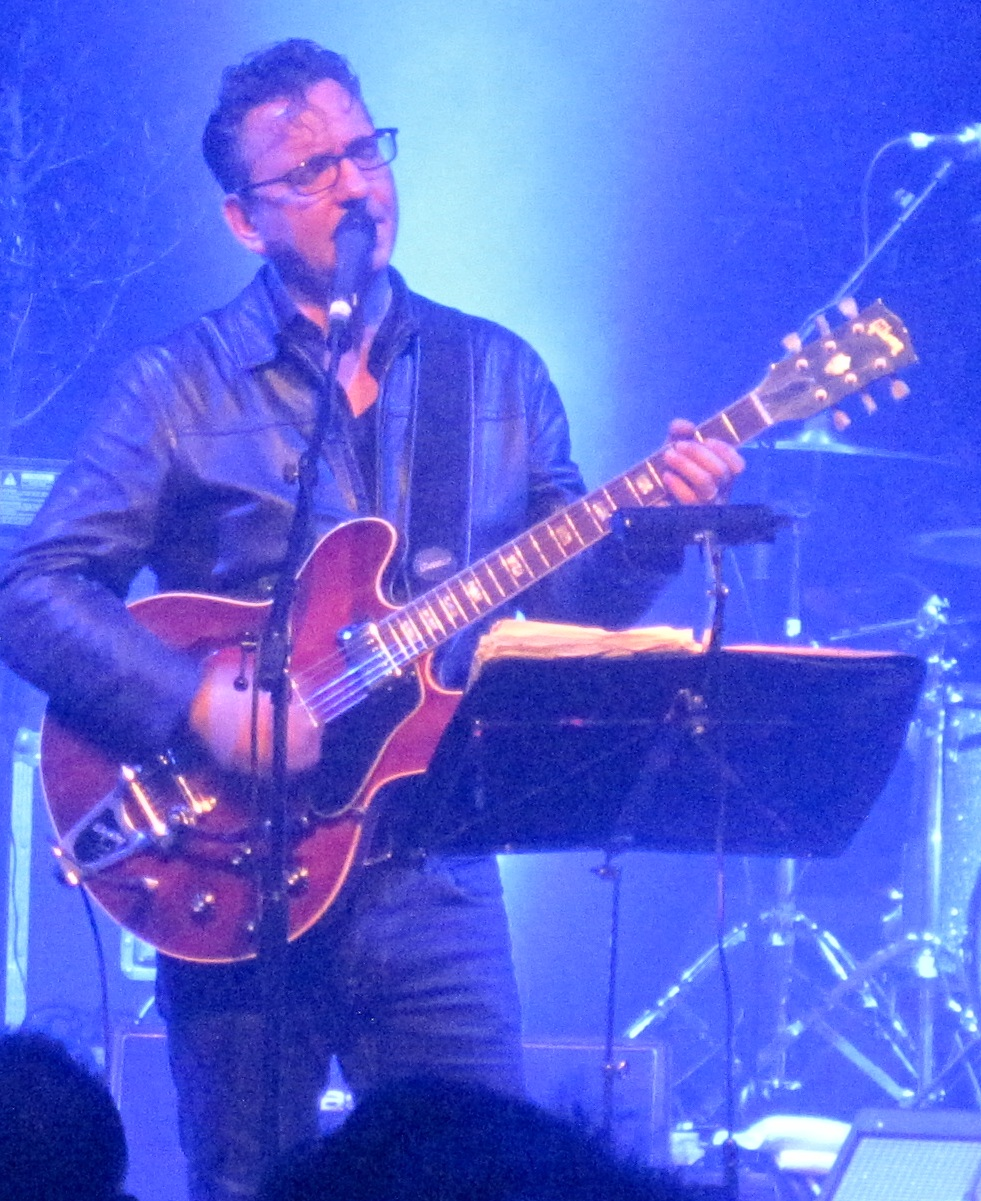
- Hawley performing in 2013

Background information
- Born: Richard Willis Hawley; 17 January 1967 (age 59); Pitsmoor, Sheffield, England
- Genres: Indie pop; baroque pop; rockabilly; easy listening
- Instruments: Vocals; guitar; piano; organ; lyre; drums; percussion
- Years active: 1989–present
- Labels: Setanta, Mute, Parlophone, Live Here Now
- Formerly of: Longpigs; Pulp
- Website: richardhawley.co.uk

Richard Willis Hawley (born 17 January 1967) is an English singer-songwriter, guitarist, and producer. After his first band Treebound Story (formed while he was still at school) broke up, Hawley found success as a member of Britpop band Longpigs in the 1990s. He played with Pulp, led by his friend Jarvis Cocker, as a touring musician for a short time. As a solo musician, Hawley has released ten studio albums. He has been nominated for a Mercury Prize twice and once for a Brit Award. He has also collaborated with Robbie Williams, Nancy Sinatra, Gwen Stefani, Arctic Monkeys, Paul Weller, Duane Eddy, Lisa Marie Presley and Manic Street Preachers.

== Early life ==
Born in Sheffield, Hawley grew up with two sisters in a working-class area of the city. He was born with a cleft palate, which required numerous operations. Both of his parents were musicians; his father Dave Hawley was a guitarist with a number of local bands (on his death, the Sheffield Star called him a "Sheffield music legend"), and his mother Lynne a singer. They divorced when he was 16 years old. He is a lifelong supporter of local football club Sheffield Wednesday. He noted that "I always wrote songs since childhood" and realising that "you could actually make something up of your own was quite a big one then". He attended Hucklow Middle School together with future Pulp bassist Steve Mackey, and passed his O-levels. Hawley briefly worked at the local HMV.

While still at school, Hawley formed the Treebound Story and at the age of 19 recorded a Peel Session together with the band. Following the band's split, Hawley briefly formed the Lovebirds releasing a single record in 1992 before being recruited to be guitarist in the Longpigs in 1993. Hawley was a member of the Longpigs until the end of the decade receiving critical attention and some, but limited, commercial success during the late 1990s Britpop era. As a member of the Longpigs, Hawley released two albums, The Sun Is Often Out and Mobile Home. After the demise of the band, he joined Pulp as a touring guitarist while also working as a session musician. During his time with both bands he was able to "quietly hone" his songwriting skills, citing that "I was never really very good about bleating on about being a songwriter".

== Solo career ==
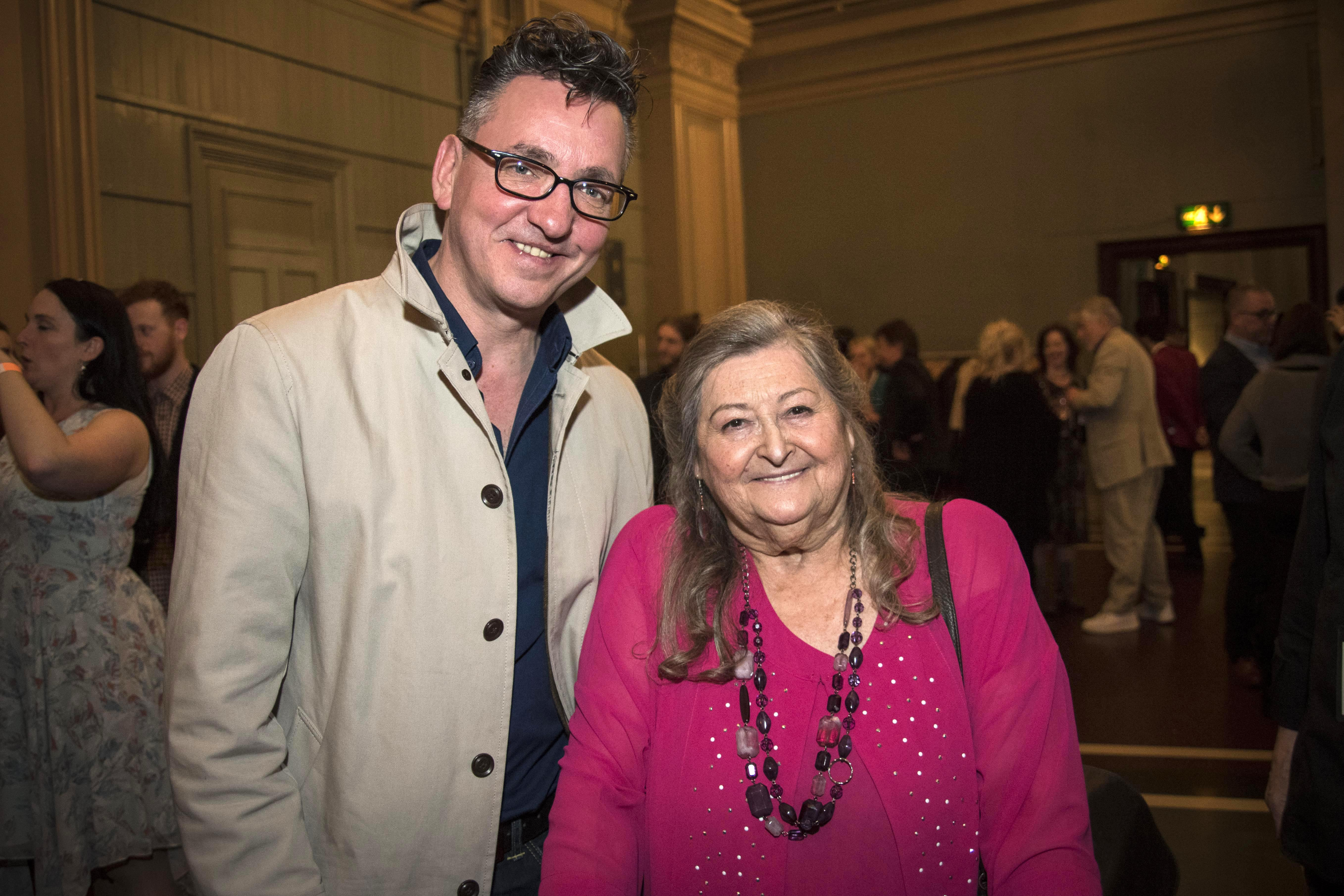
Hawley and Norma Waterson in 2016

=== Setanta (2001–2004) ===
Impressed by a home demo of songs written through the late 1990s, both Jarvis Cocker and Mackey urged Hawley to record the material. He used some left-over studio time to demo material and to experiment. Pointing out that "I just wanted to make something gentle for myself – I never expected it to be released". He recorded a song per day, recording most of the instruments himself "with a boom mike in the middle so I could walk between instruments – I mixed it in my head". His eponymous debut was a mini-album that featured seven songs and released in April 2001 through Setanta Records. It was supported by the single "Coming Home". While Hawley played "90% of the stuff" he was assisted by former Longpigs drummer Andy Cook and Colin Elliot, who became his long-term producer.

Hawley later commented that "I think with anybody's early stuff you can batter it and take things apart. [With] doing those early records I was trying to get back to a way of being creative with recording rather than taking this dogmatic approach to it". He admitted that he did not get "it right every time but I got what I wanted to achieve. It was to try and find something in the song. And also, with those early records, there was no money". Clash Magazine described it as "a rather brief burst of seven mid-paced, ’50s-flecked moments of jangle. Listening back now, it’s easy to spot the early signs of the grandeur that was to come, especially on standout "Sunlight" amongst these tentative 22 and a half minutes". The cover of the album was shot in front of a bingo hall in Cleethorpes.

In 2001, Late Night Final, named after the cry of vendors selling the Sheffield Star evening newspaper on the streets of the city, was released to positive reviews from the press. Hawley later explained that prior to going into the sessions "all I'd got was the riff to "Baby, You're My Light" and that the majority of songs were written during the sessions. As an example he cited "The Nights Are Cold" that was done in one take after Cooke asked "look, we've got a gig tonight, are we doing this or what?". Clash magazine called it "a remarkably assured, often truly gorgeous, collection of warmly evocative lullabies" singling out the songs "Baby, You’re My Light" and "The Nights Are Cold" as "mesmerising". The album was produced by Alan Smythe.

Two years later Hawley released Lowedges, named after a suburb of the city. The NME called Lowedges the "first great album of 2003" and it topped an end-of-the-year poll held by Virgin Radio. Of the two albums, he later stated that "as those three records progressed you can see the band thing taking over more and more. By the time you get to Lowedges there's less of me playing everything and there's more of the guys. I was determined for it to be very ragged-arsed and not to be really polished and produced".

=== Mute (2005–2011) ===
After leaving Setanta Records in 2004, Hawley signed to Mute Records, a division of EMI. Legal wrangling delayed Coles Corner, Hawley's third album, until September 2005. Again, Hawley mined the theme of his home city, this time referencing the location where courting lovers meet. Coles Corner eventually gained a nomination for the Mercury Prize in 2006. Alex Turner of the Arctic Monkeys, whose debut album won the prize, exclaimed "Someone call 999, Richard Hawley's been robbed!"

Hawley's 2007 album Lady's Bridge (again named with a Sheffield reference, after a bridge in the centre of the city) was released in the United Kingdom on 20 August 2007. He performed a 16-date tour during September 2007 to promote the album. Merchandising on the tour included T-shirts and posters, but also special edition bottles of Sheffield-made Henderson's Relish. The same year, Hawley's father died after a long illness. Setanta re-released his self-titled debut in 2007 extending it with five additional tracks. He later commented that the release "altered the flow, there's a track on it called 'Troublesome Waters' which is a cover of a Howard Seratt song and it's the only time me and my dad featured together on a published recording. He plays rhythm guitar".

On 14 January 2008, Hawley was nominated for his first solo Brit Award for Best British Male Performer. Hawley was a headlining act at the 2008 Festival Internacional de Benicàssim in Spain. Hawley produced, with Colin Elliot, and contributed two songs to the album Made in Sheffield, a compilation of songs by the Sheffield-based songwriters for Tony Christie.

Truelove's Gutter, Hawley's fifth studio album, was released on Mute Records on 21 September 2009. The album won the Mojo record of the year.

His song "Don't Get Hung Up in Your Soul" was chosen as the Starbucks iTunes Pick of the Week for 17 November 2009. and "Open Up Your Door" featured as the soundtrack song to the Häagen-Dazs ice cream TV commercial in the UK.

Hawley's track "Tonight The Streets Are Ours" was chosen as the title track for the Oscar nominated 2010 Banksy film Exit Through the Gift Shop which premièred at the Sundance Film Festival on 24 January 2010. This song regained popularity in 2022 when it was featured in an ad for Royal Enfield motorcycles. His 2011 song "There's a Storm Coming" was used at the end of the film Brighton Rock.

"You And I" by Richard Hawley and The Death Ramps (aka Arctic Monkeys), was released as the B-side of the Arctic Monkeys' single "Black Treacle" on 23 January 2012.

=== Parlophone (2012–2015) ===
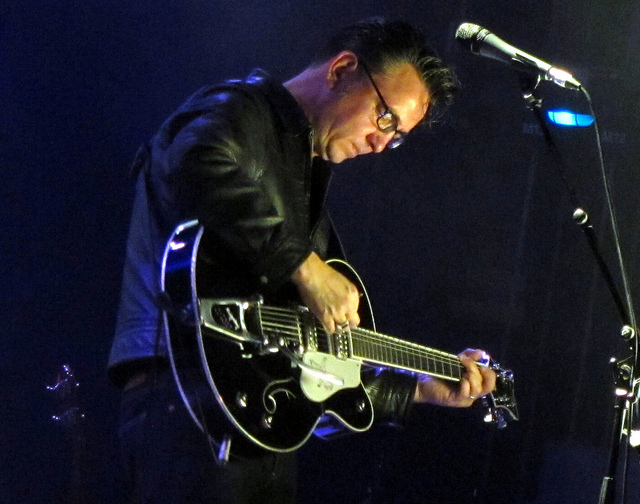
Hawley performing in 2012

Standing at the Sky's Edge, the sixth solo album, was released in the UK on 7 May 2012 through Parlophone. It was supported by the release of four singles, "Leave Your Body Behind You", "Down in the Woods", "Seek It" and "Don't Stare at the Sun". The four singles were collected on vinyl for the Singles Club box set. During the European tour in support of the album, Hawley broke his leg and had to perform in a wheelchair. In September 2012, Standing at the Sky's Edge was nominated for the 2012 Mercury Awards. Hawley also featured in a BBC6 Music live broadcast with the BBC Philharmonic Orchestra, which took place at the Magna Science Park, Rotherham. In October 2013 he joined Cocker and Kami Thompson on the Bright Phoebus Revisited UK Tour. Hawley also provided vocals for the title track of the Manic Street Preachers album, Rewind The Film, released in September 2013.

In October 2014, his previous record company, Setanta, re-released the first three albums both on vinyl and CD. He also contributed a number of songs to the soundtrack of the documentary film Love Is All in 2014. In September 2015, Hawley released his seventh album Hollow Meadows.

=== BMG Rights Management (2019–present) ===
On 31 May 2019, Hawley revealed his eighth studio album Further, released by BMG Rights Management. A cover version of Bob Dylan's "Ballad of a Thin Man" was released as a download alongside three other singles in promotion of this album.

A musical based on the album Standing at the Sky’s Edge premiered at the Sheffield Crucible Theatre in March 2019. It moved to London in February 2023 at the Olivier Theatre and subsequently transferred to the Gillian Lynne Theatre in the West End in February 2024. It won the Laurence Olivier Award for Best New Musical for 2023 and Hawley won award for best original score alongside collaborator Tom Deering.

In 2023 a compilation album, Hawley's first, was announced, titled Now Then. The album was both a 22-track double vinyl and 32-track double CD album featuring Hawley's own selection of key tracks and singles from throughout his solo career, including some songs re-recorded especially for this album.

Hawley's tenth studio album In This City They Call You Love was released in May 2024, and was preceded by three promotional singles: "Two for His Heels", "Heavy Rain", and "Prism in Jeans".

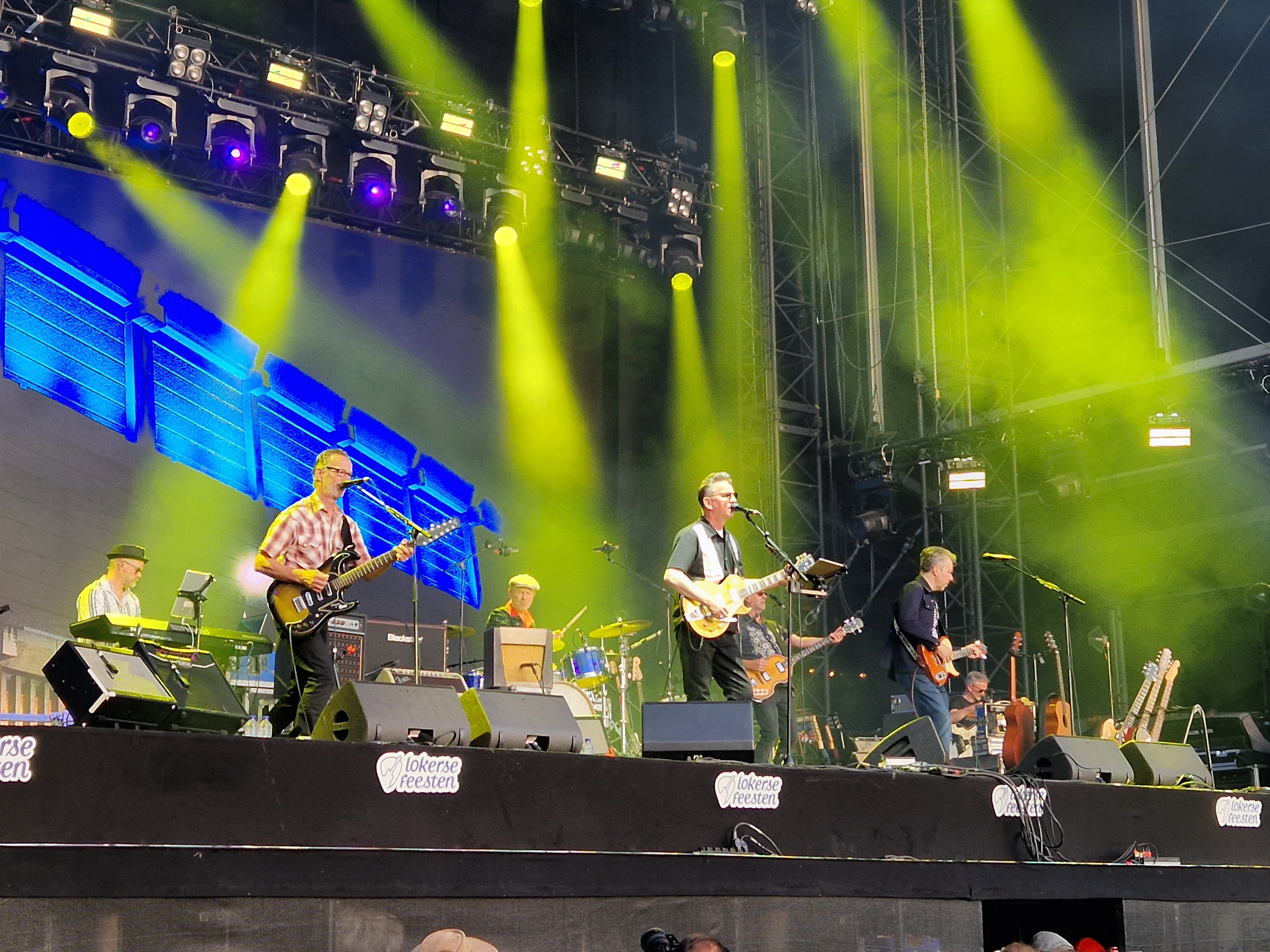
Hawley with band at 2024 Lokerse Feesten, Belgium

== Session work ==
Hawley has also worked with several musicians, including Hank Marvin, A Girl Called Eddy, and Jarvis Cocker (and his Relaxed Muscle project). He played the guitar solo on All Saints' cover version of "Under the Bridge". On working with others, Hawley noted that he has always been asked to and he likes "working with other people because you can get too absorbed in your own little bubble".

In 2002, Hawley produced the debut single "So Young" by Sheffield band Hoggboy, co-produced the band's two albums Or 8? and Seven Miles Of Love, co-wrote second album track "Hello", and also played on a cover version of Little Walter's "Come Back Baby", which was released as a B-side to the single "Believe". Hawley also produced material by lead singer Tom Hogg's next band The Hosts.

Praise from R.E.M.'s Mike Mills led to Hawley being approached to support the group on several concert dates in 2005. After contributing to Nancy Sinatra's 2004 self-titled album, Hawley supported her on a European tour in 2005 and duetted with her on several of the tour's concerts.

Hawley provided vocals for "Bad Woman", a B-side to Arctic Monkeys' single "Teddy Picker", released on 3 December 2007. He also co-wrote and provided vocals and guitar to the song "The Fix" on Elbow's Mercury Prize-winning 2008 album The Seldom Seen Kid. Hawley also performed the song with the band at the Glastonbury Festival in June 2008, on The Culture Show in June 2008, at Elbow's homecoming gigs in Manchester in 2008, Wembley Arena in March 2009, Blackpool's Empress Ballroom in March 2009 and at the MEN Arena in September 2009. He reprised his collaboration with Elbow on 17 January 2009 for a special recording of The Seldom Seen Kid with the BBC Concert Orchestra at Abbey Road Studios, which was subsequently released as a special edition CD and DVD set titled The Seldom Seen Kid Live at Abbey Road in March 2009. He appeared with Elbow on 19 March 2011 while the band were in Sheffield to perform "The Fix" during their UK tour.

Hawley's song "Baby, You're My Light" was included on the CD soundtrack for the 2008 film Nick and Norah's Infinite Playlist. Hawley himself made an appearance in the 2007 film Flick.

In October 2009, Hawley was joined on stage by Lisa Marie Presley in London for an encore; she sang vocals on a song the pair had been working on called "Weary". The two embarked on a song writing partnership in which Presley wrote the lyrics and Hawley the music. Presley's album, Storm & Grace, was released in 2012 and included the track "Weary" featuring Hawley.

Hawley worked again with Sheffield band Arctic Monkeys in January 2012, providing vocals for the "Black Treacle"'s B-side, "You And I", which was released on 23 January that year. The band usually used the alias of the Death Ramps when working in collaboration with Hawley. In 2024, Hawley featured on lap steel guitar on the track "Woke Up", which was written by Paul Weller and appeared on Weller's album 66.

== Style ==
Hawley's inspiration has largely been found in his local Sheffield. He stated that "I've only ever wanted to make music that's soulful, that has some depth and heart in it." From early on in his career he was "really obsessed with things like Chess Records, Sun Records, the Bihari brothers and those records of that time were all done in the blink of an eye and it was about capturing a moment, and there was a degree of musical alchemy in all that." Clash magazine noted the "Orbison and Walker comparisons" attributed to Hawley's early work. He described himself as "a jack of all trades" when commenting on his career as both a (session) musician and a songwriter, describing them as "running parallel". The covers and names of his albums often reference his home-town: "I know what it's like to live here in Sheffield and therefore it seems perfectly logical to write about it."

== Personal life ==
Hawley is married to Helen, a therapist; together they have three grown-up children. Hawley is cousin to Joel White, keyboard player in the Sheffield band Hague & White.

== Discography ==
=== Studio albums ===
- Richard Hawley (2001)
- Late Night Final (2001)
- Lowedges (2003)
- Coles Corner (2005)
- Lady's Bridge (2007)
- Truelove's Gutter (2009)
- Standing at the Sky's Edge (2012)
- Hollow Meadows (2015)
- Further (2019)
- In This City They Call You Love (2024)

=== Live albums ===
- Live at the Devil's Arse (2009)
- Richard Hawley Live at the Devil's Arse 28 April 2017 (2018)
- Richard Hawley Live at Halifax Piece Hall (2021)

=== Compilation albums ===
- Now Then: The Very Best of Richard Hawley (2023)

=== Film scores ===
- Flick (2008)
- Love Is All (2014)
- Funny Cow (2017)
- Urban Myths, episode: "The Dali and The Cooper" (2018)
- Pond Life (2018)
- One Way to Denmark (2020)
- Gang Related (TV series)S01:E04 (2014)

=== EPs ===
- Lady's Bridge EP – "Lady's Bridge", "The Sea Calls (Live in Sheffield)", "Roll River Roll (Live in Sheffield)", "Rockabilly Radio" – (Mute Records, 26 May 2008)
- False Lights from the Land EP, featuring Smoke Fairies – "Remorse Code", "Shallow Brown", "The Ellan Vannin Tragedy", "There's a Storm a Comin' " – (Mute Records, 7 June 2010)

=== Singles ===
- "Coming Home" (16 July 2001)
- "Baby, You're My Light" (4 February 2002) (UK No. 81)
- "That's Alright Mama" (10 June 2002)
- "Run for Me" (12 May 2003) (UK No. 186)
- "The Ocean" (22 August 2005) (UK No. 102)
- "Coles Corner" (31 October 2005) (UK No. 146)
- "Just Like the Rain" (23 January 2006) (UK No. 94)
- "Born Under a Bad Sign" (20 March 2006) (UK No. 81)
- "Coles Corner" (re-issue) (12 June 2006) (UK No. 136)
- "Hotel Room" (4 September 2006) (UK No. 64)
- "Silent Night" (12 December 2006)
- "Tonight the Streets Are Ours" (6 August 2007) (UK No. 40)
- "Serious" (15 October 2007) (UK No. 83)
- "Valentine" (28 January 2008) (UK No. 134)
- "For Your Lover, Give Some Time" (10 August 2009)
- "Open Up Your Door" (30 November 2009)
- "Leave Your Body Behind You" (2 April 2012)
- "Down in the Woods" (15 July 2012)
- "Seek It" (30 September 2012)
- "Don’t Stare at the Sun" (25 February 2013)
- "Rewind the Film" (Manic Street Preachers feat. Richard Hawley) (8 July 2013)
- "Rollin' and Tumblin'" (19 April 2014)
- "Heart of Oak" (4 September 2015)
- "I Still Want You" (6 October 2015)
- "Funny Cow" (20 April 2018)
- "Off My Mind" (6 March 2019)
- "My Little Treasures" (12 April 2019)
- "Alone" (19 April 2019)
- "Ballad of a Thin Man" (20 September 2019)
- "Not the Only Road" (14 June 2023)
- "Two for His Heels" (21 February 2024)
- "Heavy Rain" (28 March 2024)
- "Prism in Jeans" (2 May 2024)

=== Treebound Story singles ===
- "My Life's Example" (1988) (Fon Records)
- "Swimming in the Heart of Jane" (1989) (Native Records 12NTV 40)
- "Take It" (1989) (Native Records 12NTV 43)

=== Credits ===
Year	Album	Artist	Details	Ref.
1996	The Sun Is Often Out	Longpigs	As band member Vocals, guitar	
1997	Life thru a Lens	Robbie Williams	Co-writer of "Clean"	
1998	Manna	The Spokesman	Guitar and harmonica	
1999	Mobile Home	Longpigs	As band member Co-writer, vocals, guitar	
2001	Richard Hawley	Himself	Mini album Writer, producer, vocals, lap steel and twelve-string guitars	
2001	We Love Life	Pulp	Lap steel and twelve-string guitars	
2001	Late Night Final	Himself	Writer, co-producer, vocals, guitars, harmonica, piano, organ, glockenspiel, drums, mixing	
2001	Loud Like Nature	Add N to (X)	Guitar on "Sheez Mine"	
2002	Len Parrot's Memorial Lift	Baxter Dury	Guitar on "Beneath the Underdog"	
2002	"Bad Cover Version"	Pulp	Guitar on "Disco 2000" (Nick Cave version)	
2002	Total Lee! The Songs of Lee Hazlewood	Various artists	Guitar, keyboards on "The Cheat" (with Jarvis Cocker)	
2003	The Last Great Wilderness	The Pastels	Soundtrack album Guitar	
2003	Lowedges	Himself	Writer, co-producer, vocals, guitars, bass, keyboards, glockenspiel, vibraphone, lyre, drums, percussion, mixing	
2003	A Heavy Nite With...	Relaxed Muscle	Credited as "Wayne Marsden"; Guitar	
2004	Neveroddoreven	I Monster	Guitar	
2004	Much More Than Much Love	Finley Quaye	Guitar	
2004	A Girl Called Eddy	A Girl Called Eddy	Co-producer, backing vocals, guitars, keyboards, glockenspiel, vibraphone, lyre	
2004	Nancy Sinatra	Nancy Sinatra	Guitar, harmonica, lyre, vibraphone	
2004	Seven Miles Of Love	Hoggboy	Co-writer, additional producer, guitar	
2005	Coles Corner	Himself	Writer, co-producer, vocals, guitars, keyboards, piano, glockenspiel, vibraphone, lyre, drums, percussion	
2005	The Sweet Escape	Gwen Stefani	Guitar on "Wonderful Life"	
2005	Heights soundtrack	Various artists	Producer	
2006	Poison Sweet Madeira	Sophie Solomon	Vocals, percussion	
2006	Moving Out to the Country	Jools Holland & His Rhythm & Blues Orchestra	Vocals on "I'm So Lonesome I Could Cry"	
2006	Jarvis	Jarvis Cocker	Guitars, background vocals, piano, lyre, celeste	
2006	Stephen Singleton	Stephen Singleton	Harp	
2006	The Silk Ripped Dress	Chicken Legs Weaver	Guitar on "Monday Man"	
2007	Lady's Bridge	Himself	Writer, co-producer, vocals, guitars, keyboards, piano, glockenspiel, vibraphone, lyre, drums, percussion	
2007	Moving Out to the Country	Jools Holland & His Rhythm & Blues Orchestra	Vocals on "I'm So Lonesome I Could Cry"	
2007	"Teddy Picker"	Arctic Monkeys	Vocals on "Bad Woman"	
2008	The Seldom Seen Kid	Elbow	Co-writer, guitar, vocals on "The Fix"	
2008	Made in Sheffield	Tony Christie	Co-producer, guitars, bass, background vocals, piano, lyre, autoharp	
2009	Electric Butterfly	Sally Doherty	Guitar on "Something More", vocals on "Milk And Honey"	
2009	Truelove's Gutter	Himself	Writer, co-producer, vocals, guitars, bass, percussion	
2009	Further Complications	Jarvis Cocker	Guitar	
2009	Live at the Devil's Arse	Himself	Live album	
2009	Broken	Soulsavers	Co-writer, vocals on "Shadows Fall"	
2010	Wake Up the Nation	Paul Weller	Remix of "Andromeda" (deluxe edition)	
2011	Road Trip	Duane Eddy	Co-writer (four tracks), co-producer, mixing	
2012	Storm & Grace	Lisa Marie Presley	Co-writer (three tracks)	
2012	See	Pete Williams	Guitar	
2012	Standing at the Sky's Edge	Himself	Writer, co-producer, vocals, guitars	
2012	"Black Treacle"	Arctic Monkeys	Co-writer, vocals, guitar on "You and I"	
2012	"Time Doesn't Matter"	The Cuckoo Clocks	Co-writer	
2013	Rewind the Film	Manic Street Preachers	Vocals, guitar on "Rewind the Film"	
2013	The Conversation	Texas	Co-writer (seven tracks)	
2013	Vagrant Stanzas	Martin Simpson	Producer	
2014	Love Is All	Himself	Soundtrack; Writer, producer, vocals, instrumentation	
2015	Hollow Meadows	Himself	Writer, co-producer, vocals, guitars, lyre	
2018	Richard Hawley Live at the Devil's; Arse 28 April 2017	Himself	Live album	
2018	Funny Cow	Himself	Soundtrack; Writer, producer, vocals, guitar	
2018	True Meanings	Paul Weller	Remix of "The Soul Searchers" (deluxe edition)	
2019	Further	Himself	Writer, vocals, guitars	
2019	"When She Finds You"	Shakespears Sister	Vocals	
2021	Hi	Texas	Co-writer (five tracks)	
2023	Asteroid City (Original Soundtrack)	Various artists	Co-writer (two tracks)	
