= Coles Corner (album) =

Studio album by Richard Hawley
- Released: 5 September 2005
- Studios: Yellow Arch Studios, Sheffield
- Genres: Chamber pop; soft rock
- Length: 46:09
- Label: Mute
- Producers: Richard Hawley; Colin Elliot; Mike Timm

Richard Hawley chronology
Lowedges (2003)	Coles Corner (2005)	Lady's Bridge (2007)

Singles from Coles Corner
- 1. "The Ocean" Released: 22 August 2005; 2. "Coles Corner" Released: 31 October 2005; 3. "Just Like the Rain" Released: 23 January 2006; 4. "Born Under a Bad Sign" Released: 20 March 2006; 5. "Coles Corner (re-issue)" Released: 12 June 2006; 6. "Hotel Room" Released: 4 September 2006

Coles Corner is the fourth studio album from English pop/rock musician Richard Hawley, released on 5 September 2005 in the UK and the following day in the US. The title immortalises the legendary Sheffield landmark Coles Corner, a popular meeting place of old and new lovers. The album was nominated for the 2006 Mercury Music Prize for best album.

Rather than Coles Corner itself, the cover image shows the Stephen Joseph Theatre in Scarborough, although it has a remarkable resemblance.

== Critical reception ==
Professional ratings
Aggregate scores
Source	Rating
Metacritic	85/100
Review scores
Source	Rating
AllMusic	4/5 stars
The Guardian	4/5 stars
Mojo	4/5 stars
NME	7/10
The Observer	4/5 stars
Pitchfork	8.1/10
PopMatters	8/10
Q	4/5 stars
Stylus Magazine	A
Uncut	4/5 stars

Critics were almost unanimous in their praise for Coles Corner. AllMusic said that "early rock & roll and rockabilly, country, traces of the vintage-'40s pop, jazz, and even some blues, fall together in a seamless, nearly rapturous whole... Coles Corner is glorious, magical, and utterly lovely in its vision, articulation, and execution". PopMatters stated that "Coles Corner heads full-bore into the vintage sounds of five decades ago... It takes a certain flair for a modern-day artist to pull off such a retro sound, and Hawley's complete lack of irony and bombast on this record makes it work... It's certainly not uncommon for contemporary artists to mine the past and successfully corner the ever-growing adult contemporary market... but none of those youngsters can match the style and grace with which Richard Hawley crafts his music. It's achingly beautiful, disarmingly intimate, simply the best-kept secret in popular music today." The Guardian called the tracks "old-fashioned, lovelorn, immaculately produced songs" and said "[Hawley's] third album follows the template of its predecessors... if there is a difference it's in the richness of the emotions and textures". Mojo called it "a glorious melange of love, loss, regret, homesickness and romance". Pitchfork said "Coles Corner is unapologetically retro to the max but it works... Hawley resides deep inside this material, writing songs with the melodic muscle to stand up next to standards... you realize that Hawley's music can go wherever he wants it to go. He's not stuck in the past. He inhabits his record collection because he likes it there and has a feeling we will too. He's right."

MusicOMH felt that if there were any reservations it was that "many Hawley songs are interchangeable" and "apart from the title track itself – which really is a cracker – there isn't anything in this album we didn't hear in the first two. It's still gorgeous, though."

== Legacy ==
The album was included in the book 1001 Albums You Must Hear Before You Die.

== Track listing ==
All tracks written and composed by Richard Hawley, except where noted.

1. "Coles Corner" – 4:49
2. "Just Like the Rain" – 3:17
3. "Hotel Room" – 3:42
4. "Darlin' Wait for Me" (Hawley, Shez Sheridan) – 3:53
5. "The Ocean" – 5:36
6. "Born Under a Bad Sign" – 3:41
7. "I Sleep Alone" – 3:44
8. "Tonight" – 4:32
9. "(Wading Through) the Waters of My Time" – 3:48
10. "Who's Gonna Shoe Your Pretty Little Feet?" (Traditional; arranged by Hawley) – 4:08
11. "Last Orders" – 4:59

== Singles ==
In the UK, six singles were released from the album:

- "The Ocean" (22 August 2005) – # 102 UK
  - CD (CD MUTE 347): "The Ocean" (single version) / "The Ocean" (album version)
  - 7" vinyl (MUTE 347): "The Ocean" (single version) / "Kelham Island"
- "Coles Corner" (31 October 2005) – # 146 UK
  - CD (CD MUTE 352) b/w: "I'm Absolutely Hank Marvin"
  - 7" vinyl (MUTE 352) b/w: "A Bird Never Flew on One Wing"
- "Just Like the Rain" (23 January 2006) – # 94 UK
  - CD (CD MUTE 357): "Just Like the Rain" (single version) / "Room with a View" / "Long Black Veil"
- "Born Under a Bad Sign" (20 March 2006) – # 81 UK
  - CD (CD MUTE 362): "Born Under a Bad Sign" (single version) / "Dark Road" / "Just Like the Rain" (enhanced video)
  - 7" vinyl (MUTE 362): "Born Under a Bad Sign" (single version) / "I'm Just Here to Get My Baby Out of Jail"
- "Coles Corner" (re-issue) (12 June 2006) – # 136 UK
  - CD (CD MUTE 367) b/w: "Long Black Train"
  - 7" vinyl (MUTE 367) b/w: "Can You Hear the Rain, Love?" (Live Acoustic)
- "Hotel Room" (4 September 2006) – # 64 UK
  - CD (CD MUTE 379): "Hotel Room" (single version) / "Young and Beautiful" (Live Acoustic)
  - 7" vinyl (MUTE 379): "Hotel Room" (single version) / "Some Candy Talking"

== Personnel ==
- Richard Hawley – vocals, acoustic guitar, electric guitar, 12-string acoustic guitar, 12-string electric guitar, baritone guitar, Spanish guitar, Hawaiian lap steel, hammer dulcimer, enchanted lyre, Omnichord, piano, drums, steel drum, vibraphone, baby glockenspiel
- Andy Cook – drums
- Colin Elliot – baritone guitar, electric bass, upright bass, piano, percussion, backing vocals, string arrangements
- Shez Sheridan – acoustic guitar, electric guitar, 12-string acoustic guitar, 12-string electric guitar, baritone guitar, reverb tremolo guitar, backing vocals
- Jon Trier – piano, Fender Rhodes, vibraphone, baby glockenspiel
- Johnny Wood – upright slap bass
- Gaynor Sutcliffe, Lizz Lipscombe, Susannah Simmons, Lizzie Ball – violin
- Naomi Koop, Simon Graham – viola
- Liz Hanks – cello

== Charts ==
Chart performance for Coles Corner
Chart (2019–2025)	Peak position
Hungarian Physical Albums (MAHASZ)	14
Scottish Albums (Official Charts)	3
UK Albums (Official Charts)	16
UK Independent Albums (Official Charts)	50

== Certifications ==
Certifications for Coles Corner
Region	Certification	Certified units/sales
United Kingdom (BPI)	Gold	100,000^{^}
^{^} Shipments figures based on certification alone.
