= List of Cash Box Top 100 number-one singles of 1992 =

These are the singles that reached number one on the Top 100 Singles chart in 1992 as published by Cash Box magazine.

Key
†	Indicates best-performing single of 1992

Issue date	Song	Artist
January 4	"Black or White"	Michael Jackson
January 11	"Black or White"	Michael Jackson
January 18	"Black or White"	Michael Jackson
January 25	"Can't Let Go"	Mariah Carey
February 1	"Don't Let The Sun Go Down On Me"	George Michael and Elton John
February 8	"Diamonds and Pearls"	Prince & N.P.G.
February 15	"Diamonds and Pearls"	Prince & N.P.G.
February 22	"To Be With You"	Mr. Big
February 29	"To Be With You"	Mr. Big
March 7	"To Be With You"	Mr. Big
March 14	"To Be With You"	Mr. Big
March 21	"To Be With You"	Mr. Big
March 28	"Remember The Time"	Michael Jackson
April 4	"Save The Best For Last"	Vanessa Williams
April 11	"Save The Best For Last"	Vanessa Williams
April 18	"Save The Best For Last"	Vanessa Williams
April 25	"Tears In Heaven"	Eric Clapton
May 2	"Jump"	Kris Kross
May 9	"Jump"	Kris Kross
May 16	"Bohemian Rhapsody"	Queen
May 23	"My Lovin' (You're Never Gonna Get It)"	En Vogue
May 30	"My Lovin' (You're Never Gonna Get It)"	En Vogue
June 6	"My Lovin' (You're Never Gonna Get It)"	En Vogue
June 13	"Jump"	Kris Kross
June 20	"Under The Bridge"	Red Hot Chili Peppers
June 27	"I'll Be There"	Mariah Carey
July 4	"I'll Be There"	Mariah Carey
July 11	"I'll Be There"	Mariah Carey
July 18	"Baby Got Back"	Sir Mix-A-Lot
July 25	"Baby Got Back"	Sir Mix-A-Lot
August 1	"Baby Got Back"	Sir Mix-A-Lot
August 8	"Baby Got Back"	Sir Mix-A-Lot
August 15	"This Used To Be My Playground"	Madonna
August 22	"November Rain"	Guns N' Roses
August 29	"November Rain"	Guns N' Roses
September 5	"November Rain"	Guns N' Roses
September 12	"End Of The Road" †	Boyz II Men
September 19	"End Of The Road" †	Boyz II Men
September 26	"End Of The Road" †	Boyz II Men
October 3	"End Of The Road" †	Boyz II Men
October 10	"End Of The Road" †	Boyz II Men
October 17	"End Of The Road" †	Boyz II Men
October 24	"End Of The Road" †	Boyz II Men
October 31	"End Of The Road" †	Boyz II Men
November 7	"End Of The Road" †	Boyz II Men
November 14	"End Of The Road" †	Boyz II Men
November 21	"How Do You Talk To An Angel"	The Heights
November 28	"How Do You Talk To An Angel"	The Heights
December 5	"I Will Always Love You"	Whitney Houston
December 12	"The Letter"	Wayne Newton
December 19	"I Will Always Love You"	Whitney Houston
December 26	"I Will Always Love You"	Whitney Houston

== See also ==
- 1992 in music
- List of Hot 100 number-one singles of 1992 (U.S.)
