= Wayne Newton Live in Concert =

1989 concert and pay-per-view telecast

Wayne Newton Live in Concert was a pay-per-view concert special starring Wayne Newton that aired live from the Las Vegas Hilton (now the Westgate Las Vegas) on May 23, 1989. The concert was one of only a handful of times that Newton has starred in a concert special featuring his entire Las Vegas show, and was also a way of promoting his then-new album "Coming Home." The show was directed by Steve Binder, the same man who directed Elvis Presley's '68 Comeback Special. Select pieces of the show were put together in a video cassette titled "Wayne Newton: Live In Concert at the Las Vegas Hilton" & was released in 1998.

== Setlist ==
(Introduction)

1. "Also sprach Zarathustra"
2. "That's All Right"
3. "See See Rider"
4. "Promised Land"
5. "Gone at Last"
6. "Just a Gigolo"
7. "Some of These Days"
8. "You Don't Have to Say You Love Me"
9. "September Morn"
10. "Great Balls of Fire" (Fragment of Intro, Wayne on Piano)
11. "Splish Splash" (Wayne on Piano)
12. "Heartbreak Hotel" (Fragment, Wayne on Electric Guitar)
13. "Jambalaya" (Wayne on Electric Guitar)
14. "Good Hearted Woman" (Wayne on Electric Guitar)
15. "Foggy Mountain Breakdown" / "Rocky Top" (Medley)
16. "Blue Suede Shoes" (Wayne on Acoustic Guitar)
17. "Baby What You Want Me to Do" (Wayne on Acoustic Guitar)
18. "Spanish Eyes" (Instrumental, Wayne on Acoustic Guitar)
19. "Our Wedding Band" (Wayne on Acoustic Guitar)
20. "While The Feeling's Good" (Duet with Jenevi Fitzgerald-Bakch, Wayne on Acoustic Guitar)
21. "If You Love Me, Let Me Know" (Wayne on Acoustic Guitar)
22. "Take Me Home, Country Roads" (First Line)
23. "The Old Songs"
24. "Personality"
25. "Bring it on Home to Me"
26. "You Send Me"
27. "Daddy's Home"
28. "Lost in the Fifties Tonight" / "Unchained Melody" (Medley)
29. "Are You Lonesome Tonight?"
30. "Can't Help Falling in Love"

Encore

1. "Orange Blossom Special" (Wayne on Fiddle)
2. "When the Saints Go Marching In" (Wayne on Trumpet and Banjo)
3. "MacArthur Park"

== Reception ==
Drive in movie critic (and TV personality) Joe Bob Briggs was highly critical of the show in a 1989 newspaper column. Briggs mainly criticized the fact that Wayne seemed to sing too many songs by Elvis Presley (including copying his 1970s stage entrance). Briggs was also critical of the fact that Newton didn't sing any of his signature songs, including "Danke Schoen" (which Briggs jokingly called "Donka Shane"), "Daddy Don't You Walk So Fast", and "Red Roses for a Blue Lady".

However, Briggs still called Newton's show "the best show in the history of civilization." Also, Briggs wrote the review in his signature satirical style, so it is entirely possible that he was mostly joking. Briggs has often spoken of his appreciation of Newton's music, and the two have built a friendship together. Newton even wrote the foreword to Briggs' book "Joe Bob Goes Back to the Drive-In."
