= Mike Clifford =

American actor and singer (born 1943)

Mike Clifford (born November 5, 1943) is an American singer, songwriter, and actor. He is known for his 1962 pop hit “Close to Cathy,” which reached #12 on the US Pop chart.

== Early life ==
Clifford was born in Los Angeles, California, to Cal Clifford, a professional trumpet player. He began performing at school and community events at a young age and, by 15, was entertaining in local nightclubs around Los Angeles.

In 1959, Clifford signed with Liberty Records and recorded his first single, “Should I,” written and produced by Mark McIntyre. The recording featured additional vocals from Patience and Prudence, and guitar by Eddie Cochran.

Helen Noga, known for managing Johnny Mathis early in his career, became Clifford’s personal manager and helped him secure a contract with Columbia Records. Noga also arranged Clifford’s television debut on The Ed Sullivan Show, where he appeared three times in 1961.

== Initial success ==
In 1961, when Clifford was 18, his song "Bombay" gained popularity in Venezuela. He subsequently appeared on the state-owned television channel, Venevisión, in a television special.

Clifford's early recordings for Columbia garnered limited attention. In July 1962, he signed with United Artists. Jerry Leiber and Mike Stoller produced several songs for Clifford, including his most commercially successful single, "Close To Cathy", written by Earl Shuman and composed by Bob Goodman. The song reached #12 in September of that year and charted for 12 weeks. On 29 December, 1962, "What To Do With Laurie" entered the Billboard Hot 100 and peaked at #67. Clifford's last nationally charting single, "One Boy Too Late", entered the Billboard Hot 100 on 11 May, 1963. He later had several songs that were regional hits in the U.S.

Clifford's songs were also popular in Argentina, Brazil, and Canada. He received recognition in Chile, the Philippines, and Japan.

In 1965, United Artists released Clifford's debut album, For The Love Of Mike, which was reviewed in the 13 February, 1965, issue of Billboard.

Clifford appeared in Village of the Giants in 1965, singing the film's love theme, "The Glass Sphinx". In 1967, he sang the title song to Dagmar's Hot Pants. He sang "You Say Love", the love theme for the film Necromancy, in 1971; "The Morning After" for the film The Lord Of The Rings in 1972; and "Love Will Keep Us Together" for the film Sextette in 1978. In Sextette, Clifford sang "Love Will Keep Us Together" with Mae West while actor Timothy Dalton lip-synced the words.

== Subsequent career ==
Clifford appeared and sang on American Bandstand and Where the Action Is (ABC-TV). He made multiple appearances on Baltimore's Buddy Deane Show in 1962.

Clifford toured over 100 cities during 1964 and 1965 with the Dick Clark Caravan of Stars. He performed in Canada, France, Puerto Rico, Hawaii, and Mexico. He appeared in commercials for Black Cow and Slo Poke suckers, Ortho Mattress, and MJB coffee. American International Pictures purchased cartoon films from Japan and translated the dialogue and songs into English; Clifford recorded the Guy Hemric-produced song "Rose Color Sky" and another song for the soundtracks, which were released to movie theaters and television.

In 1967, Clifford began a two-week engagement at the Ye Little Club in Beverly Hills, California. Judy Garland attended his opening night. In the 1970's, Clifford played the dual role of Teen Angel and Johnny Casino in the first national tour of the Broadway musical Grease. In 1975, he appeared with operatic tenor Jan Peerce in the Broadway production of Fiddler On the Roof as Motel, the timid tailor. In 1976, he traveled to Paris, France, to co-star with Line Renaud in a show titled Paris Line at the Casino de Paris; a cast album of the show was recorded in Paris, featuring Clifford in several solo performances.

== Songs ==
Clifford recorded songs for several films and television productions, including:

- "Joanna" for the television series Peter Gunn (1961)
- "At Last" for the United Artists release The Last Time I Saw Archie (1961)
- "It Had Better Be Tonight" for the Mirisch-G&E Production The Pink Panther (1963)
- "Barbara's Theme" for the film Diary of a Bachelor (1964)
- "How to Murder Your Wife" and "Here's to My Lover" for the film How to Murder Your Wife (1965)
- "Magic Night" for the soundtrack of Mondo Hollywood (1967)
- "It's a Dream Away" for the American International Pictures film The Glass Sphinx (1967)
- "The Golden Breed" for the Hollywood International Production film The Golden Breed (1968)
- "Mary Jane", the title song for the American International Pictures film Mary Jane (1968)
- The theme for the film Those Fantastic Flying Fools (year unknown)
- "You Say Love" for the Trans-American film Dagmar's Hot Pants, Inc. (1971)
- "The Morning After", the theme for Necromancy (1972), a Cinerama–Zenith International Production

In the early 1970s, Clifford and Lu Ann Simms recorded a new version of the Beach Party album music after Frankie and Annette recorded the final versions for the films. These recordings were released as Summer Fun by the Columbia House mail order division as a bonus gift.

Clifford continued performing, beginning his nightclub and concert career at the Elegantin Club in Brooklyn, New York, alongside Totie Fields.

He has toured with his singing partner, Sandy Zacky. The two released a collaborative album in 2007 titled Love Is Everything. In 2010, Clifford recorded "Mack The Knife", released as an MP3 by Hired Gun Records.

In 2015, Clifford traveled to Long Island, New York, for the annual doo-wop show, where he headlined with Jimmy Clanton, Johnny Tillotson, and Chuck Jackson, among others. In 2017, Clifford released a dance mix version of "What a Wonderful World", which included his first music video, which he starred in, co-produced, and directed. He also recorded a ballad version of the song with piano accompaniment by Ben DiTosti. Both songs were made available for download. In late 2017, Clifford produced his second music video, a remake of Nat King Cole's "The Christmas Song", arranged by Ben DiTosti and co-produced by Maurice Gainen for Clifford's label, Grover Stew Music.

On the 50th anniversary of Judy Garland's passing, Clifford released a new recording and video of "Over The Rainbow".

In December 2021, Clifford released a new recording of "Ave Maria", sung in Latin, arranged by Ben DiTosti, and produced by Maurice Gainen.

In September 2026, Mike released a new version of the 60’s hit by Peter Noone and Herman’s Hermits, “There’s a Kind of Hush.” The new audio and video both received universal critical acclaim.

== Discography ==
=== Singles ===
Year	Title	Peak chart positions		Record Label	B-side	Album
Year	Title	US Pop	US AC	Record Label	B-side	Album
1959	"Should I"	—	—	Liberty	"Whisper Whisper"	
1959	"I'm Afraid to Say I Love You"	—	—	Liberty	"I Don't Know Why"	
1960	"Poor Little Girl"	—	—	Columbia	"Stranger"	
1961	"Uh Huh"	—	—	Columbia	"Look in Any Window"	
1961	"Pretty Little Girl in the Yellow Dress"	—	—	Columbia	"At Last"	
1961	"Bombay"	—	—	Columbia	"When We Marry"	
1962	"Joanna"	—	—	Columbia	"Mary, Mary"	
1962	"Close to Cathy"	12	4	United Artists	"She's Just Another Girl"	For the Love of Mike
1962	"What to Do With Laurie"	68	—	United Artists	"That's What They Said"	For the Love of Mike
1963	"One Boy Too Late"	96	—	United Artists	"Danny's Dream"	
1963	"Gee, I Don't Remember"	—	—	United Artists	"Cotton Dresses"	
1964	"All the Colors of the Rainbow (Turn to Blue)"	—	—	United Artists	"It Had Better Be Tonight (Meglio Stasera)"	For the Love of Mike
1964	"One by One the Roses Died"	—	—	United Artists	"See You in September"	For the Love of Mike
1964	"Don't Make Her Cry"	—	—	United Artists	"Barbara's Theme"	For the Love of Mike
1965	"How to Murder Your Wife"	—	—	United Artists	"Here's to My Lover"	
1965	"Before I Loved Her"	—	—	Cameo	"Shirl Girl"	
1965	"Out in the Country"	—	—	Cameo	"Counting'"	
1967	"Send Her Flowers"	—	—	Sidewalk	"This Time, Time May Be Wrong"	
1970	"Broken Hearted Man"	—	—	American International	"When Cindy When"	
1970	"You Better Start Singing Soon"	—	—	American International	"Do Your Own Thing"	
