= The Letter (Wayne Newton song) =

Single by Wayne Newton

from the album Moods & Moments
- Released: 1992
- Genre: Country
- Length: 4:29
- Label: Curb
- Songwriters: Rick Goodman, John Minick, Kathleen McCrone, Wayne Newton
- Producers: Johnny Minick, Rick Goodman, Wayne Newton

Wayne Newton singles chronology
"I Know So" (1991)	"The Letter" (1992)

"The Letter" is a 1992 single by American singer Wayne Newton from his album Moods & Moments. The song peaked at number one on Cashbox's Top 100 Country Singles chart in July 1992 and took an additional five months to reach number one on the Cashbox Top 100 Pop Singles chart in December 1992. Although the song peaked at number one in Cashbox, "The Letter" did not appear on any of Billboard's charts.

== Background ==
In a 1991 interview with Ralph Emery on Nashville Now, Newton revealed that "The Letter" was based on a discarded note written by Elvis Presley in 1976 during his final stay at the Las Vegas Hilton. Years after Presley's death, Newton bought Presley's note in June 1991 at a Sotheby's auction for $13,200. Newton wrote "The Letter" after receiving requests to provide copies of Presley's note to his fans. In the lyrics for "The Letter", Newton sings about Presley's loneliness and includes a word for word reading of Presley's note that he bought at Sotheby's.

== Reception ==
Cashbox said Newton transformed "The Letter" from a fan favorite to a religious awakening. Billboard′s review of the single (as a promotional CD) stated, "A letter written by Elvis Presley is the subject matter in Newton's co-written number. Newton's talent and the quality of production speak strongly for themselves, but the commercial appeal on the country radio level is at question."

== Chart performance ==
On July 11, 1992, "The Letter" peaked at number one on the Cashbox Top 100 Country Singles chart. After remaining on the Cashbox Top 100 Pop Singles chart for almost six months, "The Letter" reached number one on December 12, 1992. Despite peaking at number one in Cashbox, "The Letter" did not chart on any Billboard chart, though it was reviewed by the magazine and did appear on Billboard's music videos chart, "The Clip List", for a few months, as TNN (The Nashville Network) listed it among its rotation of videos. The circumstances of the song's sole performance on Cashbox and not on Billboard or local station charts led to widespread accusations of chart fixing at the time. No official finding was ever released.

== Music video ==
In 1992, Newton released a music video for "The Letter". In the music video, Newton performs at the Hilton and reads out Presley's note.

== See also ==
- List of Cash Box Top 100 number-one singles of 1992
- Payola
