= Shirl Girl =

Single by Wayne Newton
- B-side: "Someone's Ahead of You"
- Released: October 14, 1963
- Genre: Pop
- Length: 2:30
- Label: Capitol Records 5058
- Songwriter(s): Rudy Clark, Bobby Darin

Wayne Newton singles chronology
"Danke Schoen" (1963)	"Shirl Girl" (1963)	"I Still Love You" (1964)

"Shirl Girl" is a song written by Rudy Clark and Bobby Darin and performed by Wayne Newton. The song was arranged by Bert Keyes.

== Chart performance ==
"Shirl Girl" reached #18 on the U.S. adult contemporary chart and #58 on the Billboard Hot 100 in 1963.

== Other versions ==
- Mike Clifford released a version as the B-side to his 1965 single "Before I Loved Her".
