= Wayne Newton =

American singer and entertainer (born 1942)

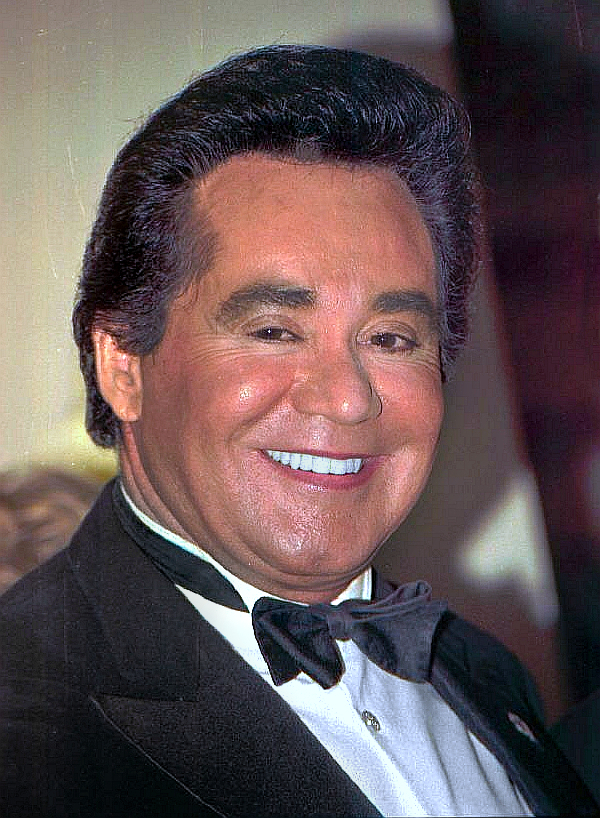
- Newton in 2002
- Born: Carson Wayne Newton; April 3, 1942 (age 84); Norfolk, Virginia, U.S.
- Other names: Mr. Las Vegas, The Midnight Idol, Mr. Entertainment
- Years active: 1959–present
- Spouses: Elaine Okamura (m. 1968; div. 1985) Kathleen McCrone (m. 1994)
- Children: 2
- Musical career
- Genres: Jazz, traditional pop, lounge
- Occupations: Singer, actor
- Instruments: Vocals; guitar; violin; banjo; piano
- Labels: Capitol; Chelsea; Curb; MGM
- Website: waynenewton.com

Carson Wayne Newton (born April 3, 1942), also known as Mr. Las Vegas, is an American singer and actor. One of the most popular singers in the United States from the mid-to-late 20th century, Newton remains one of the best-known entertainers in Las Vegas and has performed there since 1958, headlining since 1963. He is known by other nicknames such as "The Midnight Idol" and "Mr. Entertainment".

One of the city's most popular performers and at his peak more prominent in Las Vegas than both Sinatra and Presley, Newton has been called by The Washington Post "America's number one night club act." Newton is the highest-grossing entertainer in Las Vegas history. Newton has also appeared in a number of movies and television shows, quite often playing himself or a character associated with Las Vegas.

His well known songs include "Danke Schoen" (1963), "Summer Wind" (1965), "Red Roses for a Blue Lady" (1965), "Daddy, Don't You Walk So Fast" (1972) and "Years" (1980). "Danke Schoen" is Newton's signature song and was notably used in the 1986 movie Ferris Bueller's Day Off.

== Early years ==
Newton was born Carson Wayne Newton in Norfolk, Virginia, to Patrick Newton (1915–1990), an auto mechanic, and his wife, Evelyn Marie Smith (1921–1985). He is of English, Irish, Scottish, Welsh, and German ancestry. He told his audience at a concert in Ocean City, NJ, on August 26, 2025, that 50 percent of his heritage is Native American. His father served in the U.S. Navy during World War II. Newton spent his early years in Fredericksburg, Virginia, learning the piano, guitar, and steel guitar at age six. He has perfect pitch. He performed in a local music radio show, playing steel guitar and singing country music, before school. On the weekends, he performed in a traveling road show of the Grand Ole Opry.

While he was a child, his family moved near Newark, Ohio. He began singing in local clubs, theaters, and fairs with his older brother, Jerry. Due to Newton's severe asthma, his family moved to Phoenix in 1952, at his doctor's suggestion. Soon after arriving in Phoenix, the brothers competed in a local television talent show, Lew King Rangers, and won. As a result, the owner of KOOL-TV, Tom Chauncey, who also televised the talent show, gave the brothers their own television show, Rascals in Rhythm, and served as a mentor to them. The brothers, as the Rascals in Rhythm, appeared with the Grand Ole Opry roadshows and on ABC-TV's Ozark Jubilee, performed in front of then-president Dwight D. Eisenhower and auditioned unsuccessfully for Ted Mack's Original Amateur Hour.

Newton attended North High School where he was the Sophomore Class President. He was also a member of the Junior Reserve Officers' Training Corps. In the spring of 1958, near the end of his junior year of high school, a Las Vegas booking agent saw the two Newton brothers performing on their local TV show and took them back for an audition. Impressed with their audition, the booking agent signed Newton, then age 17, and his brother, as part of a two-week contract to perform in Las Vegas at the Fremont Hotel. On closing night, Newton and his brother were offered a one-year contract to continue performing in Las Vegas. To pursue his music career, Newton left North High School just before finishing his junior year.

At age 18, Newton intended to join the US military, but because of his asthma he was given a 1-Y rejection meaning he was qualified to serve only in the event of a major emergency. Instead, Newton volunteered his time performing shows for troops overseas.

== Career as an entertainer ==
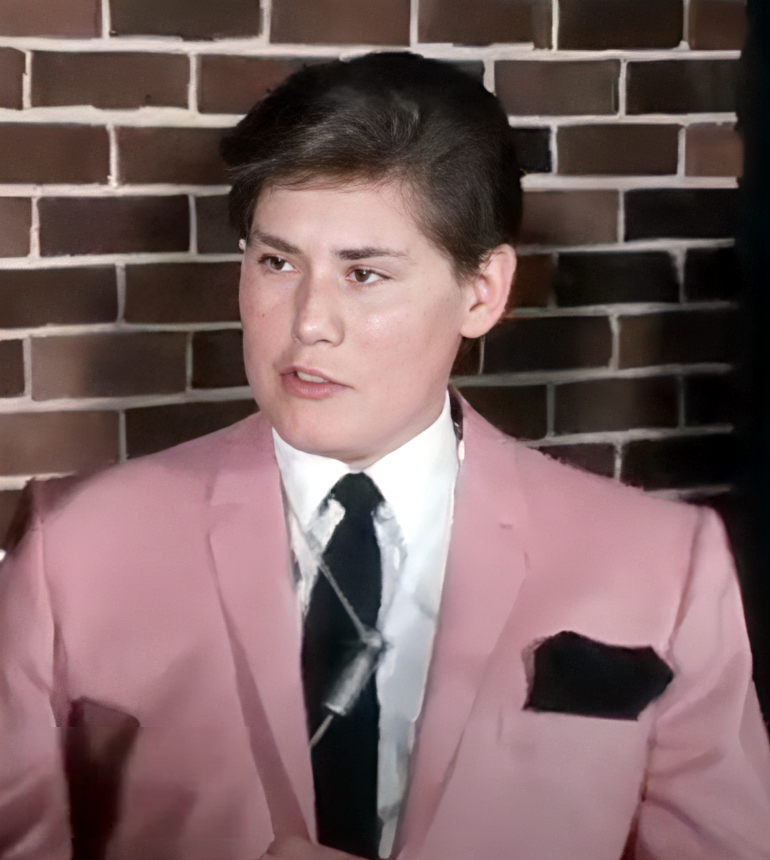
Newton in 1968

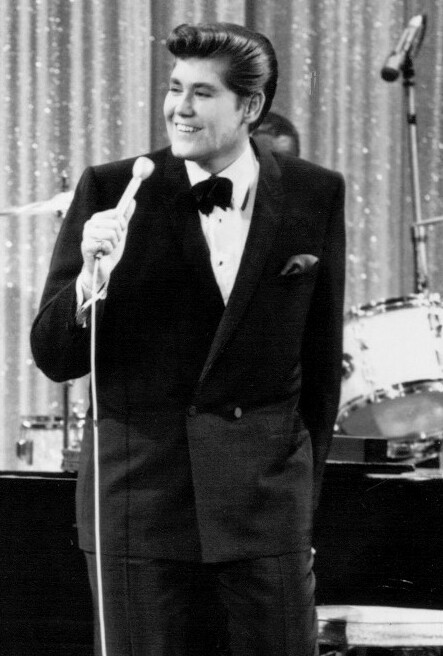
Newton performing in 1968 in the television music special One More Time

=== Early career ===
Wayne Newton and his brother performed at the Fremont Hotel for five years, doing six shows daily six days a week. Newton credits his ability to base his performances on what the crowd wanted to hear for his early success in Las Vegas. In 1962, Newton performed the Irish folk song "Danny Boy" for Jackie Gleason in Phoenix. Impressed by Newton's performance, Gleason told Newton "don't go on any other television show before you go on mine."

On September 29, 1962, the brothers first performed on The Jackie Gleason Show. Over the next two years, Newton would perform on Gleason's show 12 times, which were his first appearances on national television. In the early to mid-1960s, Newton also acted and sang as "Andy", the baby-faced Ponderosa ranchhand, on the classic western TV series Bonanza. During the filming of Bonanza, Newton first met Elvis Presley (who was filming another show on the same set) and they went on to become good friends.

In 1962, Jackie Gleason organized an engagement between Newton and the Copacabana. There Newton first met Bobby Darin. Darin, who was impressed by Newton, agreed to produce Newton's records. By 1963 Newton had been signed to Capitol Records, and his first album was released on the label. Newton's hit song "Danke Schoen" was originally written for Darin to sing, however Darin was intent on Newton having a hit song of his own and gave it to him. "Danke Schoen" went on to reach No. 13 on the Hot 100.

Many other prominent entertainment icons such as Lucille Ball, Danny Thomas, George Burns, and Jack Benny lent Newton their support. For example, after Benny saw Newton performing at a nightclub in Sydney, he hired him to perform an opening act for a booking he had at Harrah's Reno. Benny then hired Newton as an opening act for his comedy show in Las Vegas and to perform on The Jack Benny Program, which Newton did for five years. After his job with Benny ended, Newton was offered a job to open for another comic at the Flamingo, but Newton asked for, and was given, a headline act in 1963.

In 1965, Newton performed on The Lucy Show as a country boy singing to animals. Impressed with Newton's performance, CBS offered Newton his own TV show around this character. Newton declined the offer, at the urging of Lucille Ball, who told Newton unless "you want to be this country boy the rest of your life, turn this series down..."

Newton was known for his distinctive high-pitched voice, which stayed with him for most of his career, although his voice did lower somewhat in the 1970s and 1980s. In the 1970s, Newton began focusing on primarily performing in Las Vegas.

=== Mr. Las Vegas ===
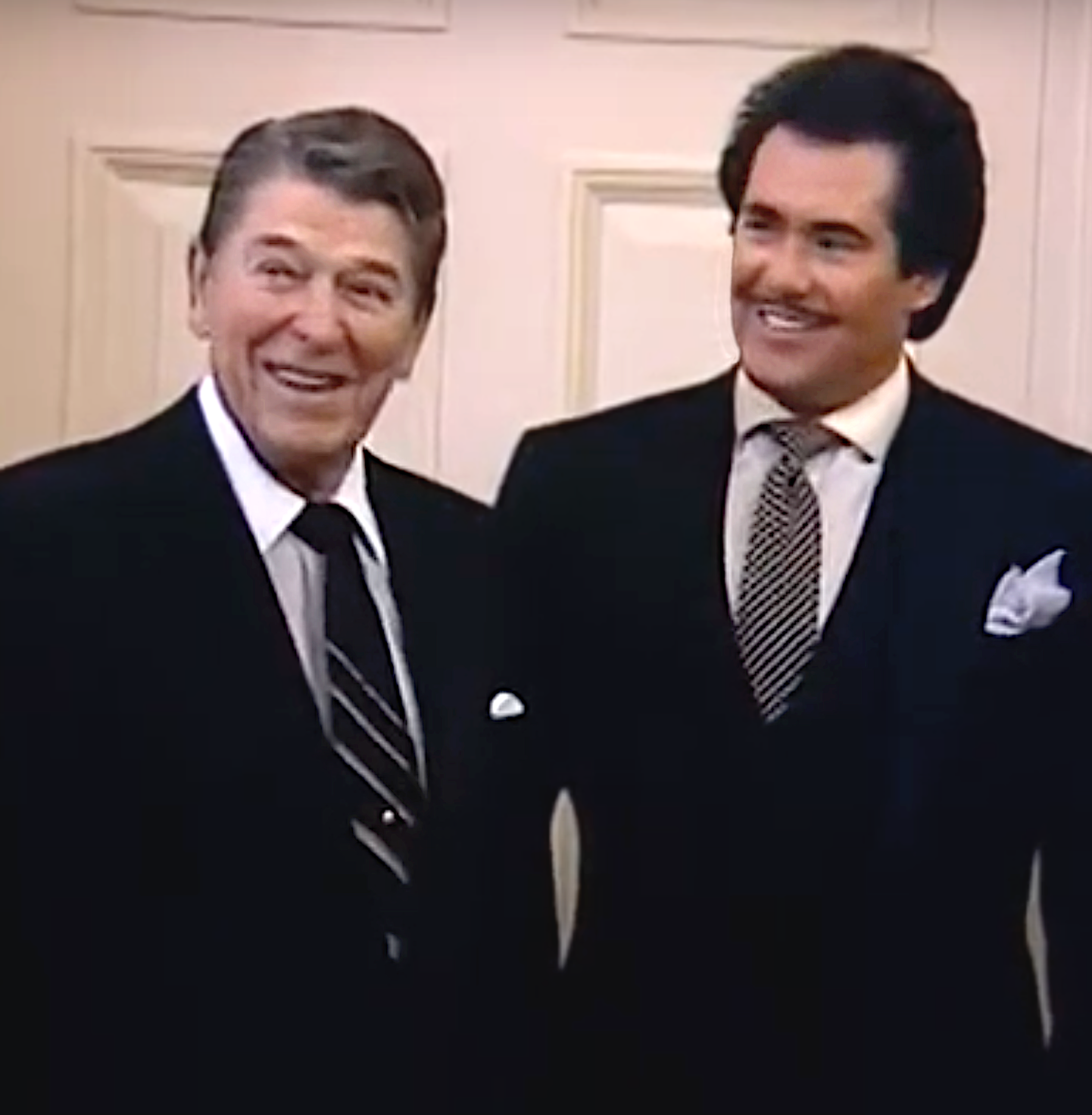
Newton with President Ronald Reagan in 1988

Following the death of Elvis Presley and the aging of many members of the Rat Pack, Newton emerged as the biggest entertainer in Las Vegas. In the 1970s, Newton performed primarily at the Desert Inn, The Frontier and Sands Hotel and Casino. Newton holds the record for total crowd counts during his peak.

Esquire described Newton as "the biggest moneymaker in the history of Vegas. Nobody has drawn like that week in, week out. Not Elvis, not Sinatra. There's just no comparison." Newton's shows were especially popular in Las Vegas because of their length - often lasting up to three hours - which stood out in comparison to the short length of many headliners' shows at the time in Las Vegas.

In 1972, his recording of "Daddy, Don't You Walk So Fast" sold more than one million copies and was awarded a gold disc by the RIAA in July 1972. The song peaked at No. 4 in the United States and No. 1 in Australia and Canada, while the album of the same name peaked at No. 25 on the album charts.

In 1975, Newton was featured in Glen Campbell Live in London, a TV special for the BBC. Campbell and Newton sang three songs together.

From 1980 to 1982, The Beach Boys and The Grass Roots performed Independence Day concerts on the National Mall in Washington, D.C., attracting large crowds. In April 1983, James G. Watt, President Reagan's Secretary of the Interior, banned Independence Day concerts on the Mall by such groups. Watt said that "rock bands" that had performed on the Mall on Independence Day in 1981 and 1982 had encouraged drug use and alcoholism and had attracted "the wrong element" who would threaten individuals and families attending any similar events in the future. Watt then announced that Newton, a friend and supporter of President Reagan, would perform at the Mall's 1983 Independence Day celebration. Newton entered the Independence Day stage on the Mall on July 4, 1983, to mostly cheering members of the audience, but some members booed.

On May 23, 1989, Newton's live stage show was broadcast as a pay-per-view event called Wayne Newton Live in Concert. Newton did not perform his trademark songs "Danke Schoen" or "Red Roses for a Blue Lady"; however, he closed the show with a special finale of "MacArthur Park" which culminated with an onstage rainfall.

On December 12, 1992, Newton hit No. 1 on the Cashbox Pop and Country charts with an Elvis-inspired song "The Letter." Controversy swirled around this chart feat as "The Letter" did not chart at all on Billboard's authoritative Hot 100 chart, Adult Contemporary chart, or "Bubbling Under" chart. It did not make the Radio & Records chart either. This marked the first and only time in history that a record hit No. 1 on the Cashbox Top 100 chart yet failed to chart on Billboard's Hot 100.

In May 1993, Newton created a $10 million theater in Branson, Missouri named "The Wayne Newton Theater." After construction completed, The Family Channel had a TV special hosted on their network. Following contract disputes with the parent company, Shenandoah South, and a lawsuit between them and Wayne Newton, the theater was renamed to "The Mansion Theater of Performing Arts." It is still operating and hosts a variety of artists.

In the late 1990s, Newton began performing at other casinos as their headliner, including Bally's, Caesars Palace, and MGM Grand Las Vegas. Newton performed his 25,000th solo show in Las Vegas in 1994. In 1999, Newton signed a 10-year-deal with the Stardust, calling for Newton to perform there 40 weeks out of the year for six shows a week in a showroom named after him. The "headliner-in-residence" deal was the first of its kind. In 2005, in preparation for the eventual demolition of the Stardust Casino, the deal was amicably terminated. His last show at the Stardust was on April 20, 2005. In his final performance at the Stardust, Newton sang nearly his entire repertoire and songs of other Vegas mainstays as well. During the summer of 2005, Newton began a 30-show stint that summer at the Las Vegas Hilton.

=== Later and current career ===
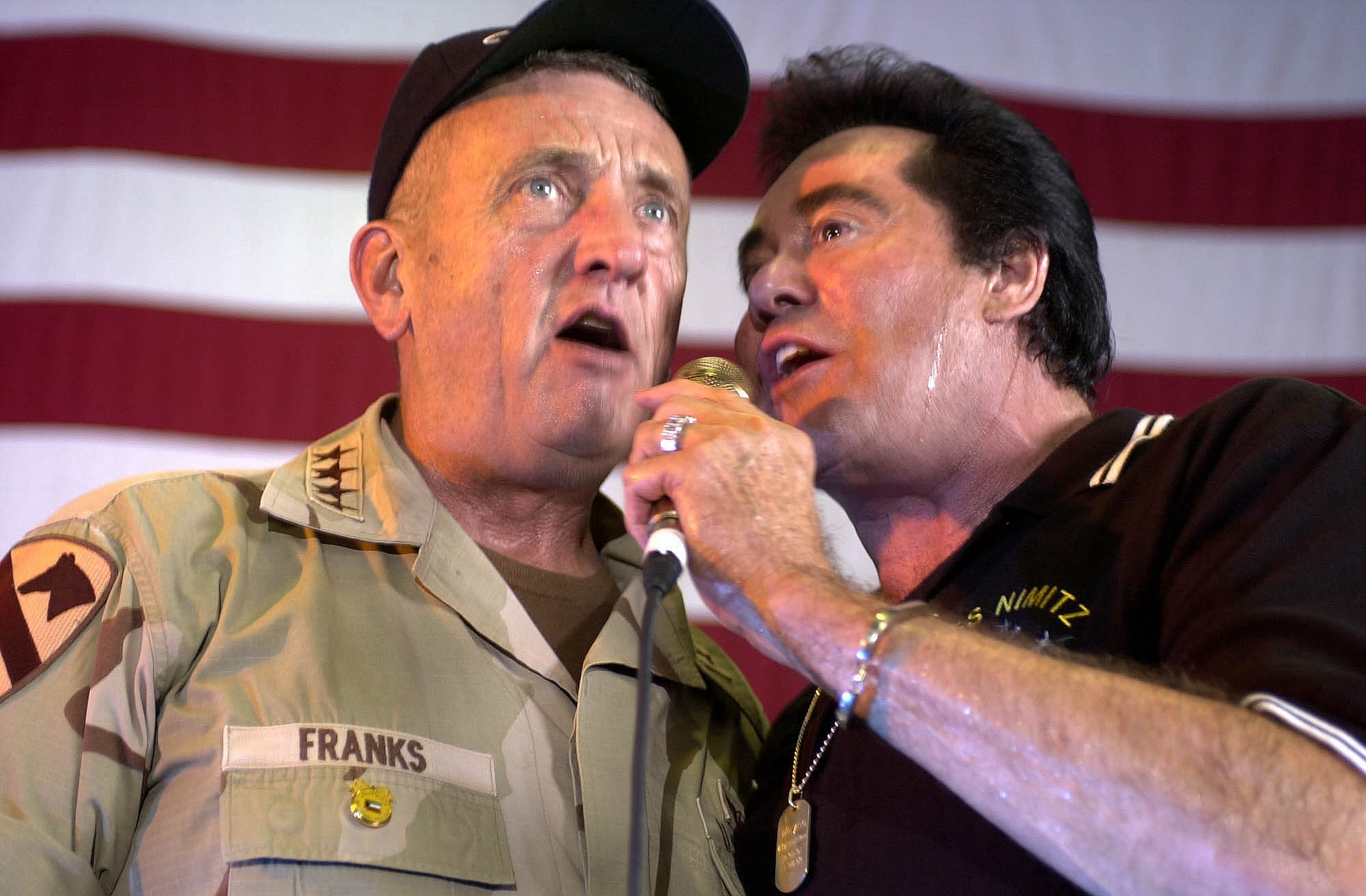
Gen. Tommy Franks, Commander, U.S. Forces Central Command (CENTCOM) sings a duet with Wayne Newton aboard the USS Nimitz during a USO show. At the time, the USS Nimitz was deployed to the Persian Gulf in support of Operation Iraqi Freedom. June 2003.

Going into the 2000s, Newton continued to perform shows in Las Vegas and took a larger role serving as the face of Las Vegas.

In January 2005 Newton started a reality television show on E! called The Entertainer. The winner got a spot in his act plus a headlining act of their own for a year. During player introductions at the 2007 NBA All-Star Weekend in Las Vegas, Newton sang Presley's "Viva Las Vegas."

Newton was featured on the 2007 fall season of Dancing with the Stars partnered with two-time champion Cheryl Burke. He became the third contestant to be eliminated from the contest. During the taping (which takes place at CBS Television City), he also became the first guest on The Price Is Right, which tapes on the same lot, under host Drew Carey, who began adding guests to the show, especially to present prizes. Newton appeared after a trip to Las Vegas was shown.

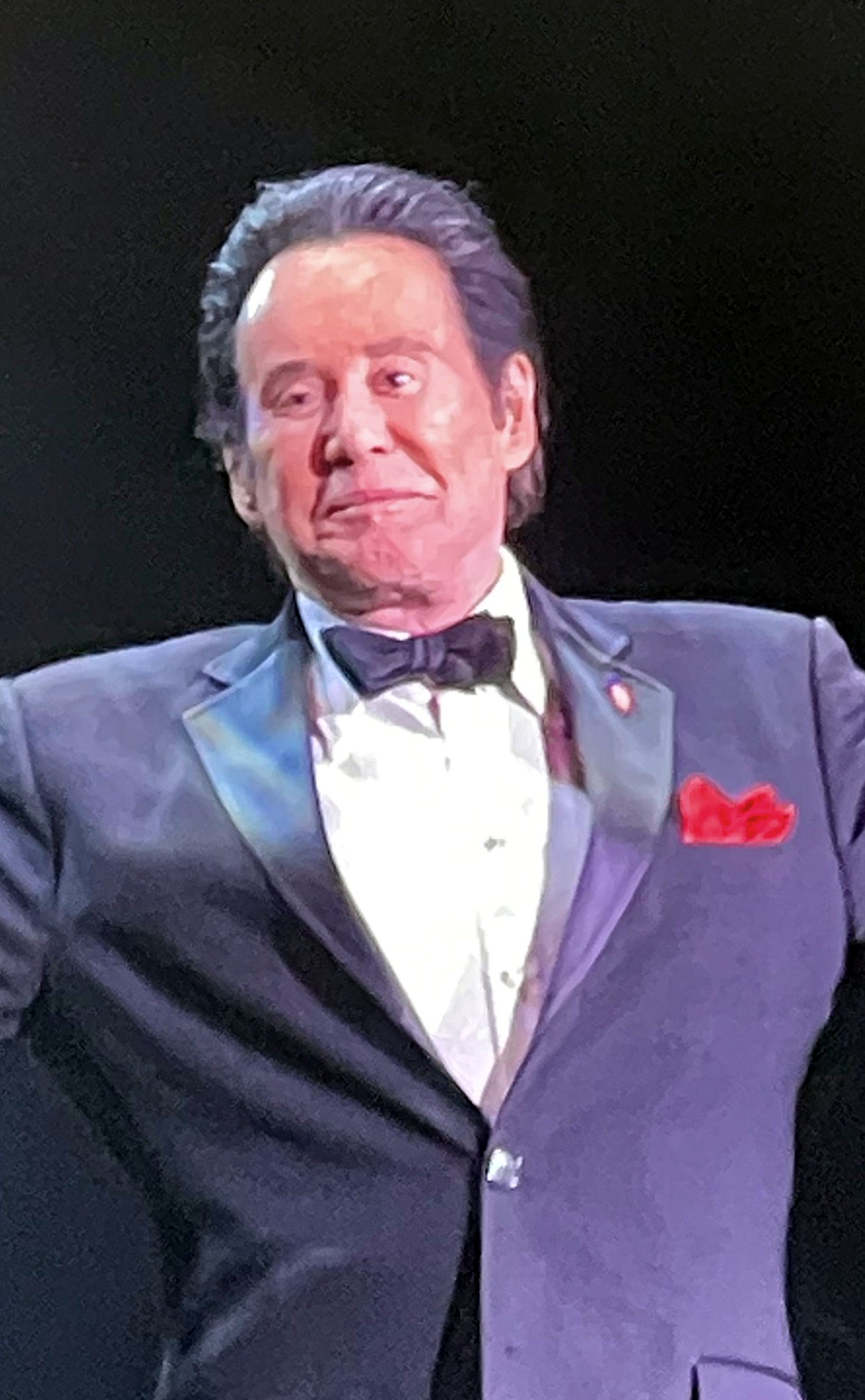
Newton performing in Atlantic City in 2023

Beginning October 14, 2009, Newton began performing his then newest show "Once Before I Go" at the Tropicana in Las Vegas. In 2010, Newton took a five-year hiatus to spend time with his family and prepare his voice for later shows in Las Vegas.

In 2016, Newton returned to the stage at Bally's Hotel in the form of a lounge show called "Up Close & Personal," a combination of live singing, playing some of the 13 self-taught instruments (having learned in the past to give his voice a rest when performing six shows a night at the Fremont Hotel), and showing movie and TV clips of himself on screen. In 2010, Newton played the role of a radio DJ named "Mr. New Vegas" in the video game Fallout: New Vegas, a role that was created for him.

After performing more than 30,000 shows on the Las Vegas Strip, Newton celebrated his 60th year on stage with a show entitled "Mr. Las Vegas" at Caesars Palace that ran from January to May 2019. Referring to his 60th year on stage, Newton said "It's hard for me to articulate, much less think about it...I was here when Caesars (Palace) was built. This hotel for me has always represented the flagship of the Strip."

In June 2020, Newton was seen on television commercials in North America as a spokesperson for Caesars Entertainment to promote the reopening of Caesars Entertainment resorts during the COVID-19 pandemic.

In January 2022, Wayne, in partnership with Caesars Entertainment, began performing his show, "Wayne: Up Close and Personal" in the Flamingo Las Vegas, receiving a theater shared with X Burlesque named the "Wayne Newton Theater."

During the 2022 NFL draft, which was held in Las Vegas, Newton announced, alongside Hall of Fame running back Marcus Allen, the Las Vegas Raiders' third round pick selection of Dylan Parham from the University of Memphis.

== Personal life ==
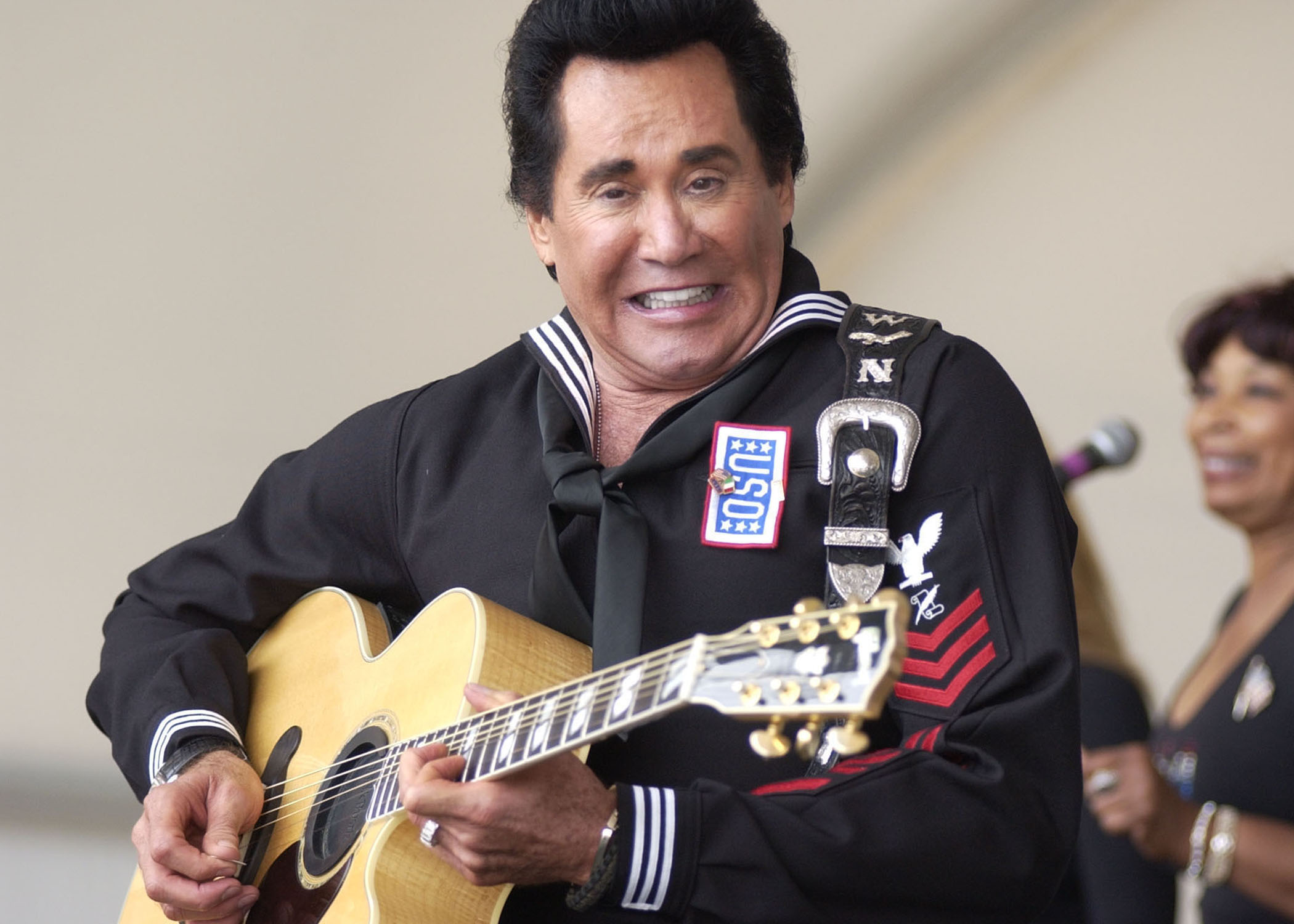
Wayne Newton strums the guitar during his USO show at the Patriotic Festival held on the Virginia Beach Oceanfront in May 2005.

On June 1, 1968, Newton married Elaine Okamura. They divorced in 1985. They have one daughter named Erin, born in 1976.

On April 9, 1994, Newton married Kathleen McCrone, a lawyer from North Olmsted, Ohio. Together they have one daughter named Lauren, born in 2002.

Newton was floated as a potential candidate for United States Senate by Frank Fahrenkopf, the former Republican State Chairman of Nevada, but Newton declined to run.

A street near Harry Reid International Airport is named Wayne Newton Boulevard. Newton was elected to the Gaming Hall of Fame in 2000. In 2010, Newton testified in front of the Rules Committee of the Virginia House of Delegates where he appealed for the state to recognize the Patawomeck Indian Tribe of Virginia. Newton has stated that his father and grandfather have Patawomeck ancestry.

=== Arabian horse breeding ===
Newton has stated, "My two loves in life, from the time I can remember, were music and horses, and I couldn't decide which I loved more." His Arabian horse breeding program, located at his Casa de Shenandoah ranch, is called Aramus Arabians, and has produced six generations of horses, breeding over 700 foals, with 96 champions as of 2014.

Newton's first experience with horses was at his uncle's farm, where he visited frequently. He bought his first horse when he sold his bicycle and his parents' movie camera to buy a foal when he was a sixth-grader. Originally owning Thoroughbreds and American Quarter Horses, he "fell in love" with the Arabian breed via his ownership of the Champion stallion Aramus, after whom he named his horse ranch.

He first came to the attention of Arabian breeders in 1969 when he partnered with Tom Chauncey, an Arabian breeder and television station owner, to purchase the stallion Naborr from the estate of Anne McCormick. They paid $150,000, which at the time was the highest price ever paid for an Arabian horse at auction. Shortly thereafter, Newton formed a partnership with other Arabian breeders to purchase Aramus, who was a son of Naborr. He became the sole owner of Aramus in 1972.

Newton was given the Arabian Horse Breeders' Alliance (AHBA) Lifetime Achievement Award in 2007 during the first Arabian Breeder's World Cup in Las Vegas. He continues to be directly involved in management of his horses, planning the breeding program for his horses, determining which to keep and which to sell, and even assisting his ranch staff during foaling season. He was awarded the Arabian Professional and Amateur Horseman's Association Breeder of the Year award in 1996.

=== Charitable causes ===
Newton was featured in the production of "You Can't Say Love Enough" (1996), an all-star single, also featuring Dolly Parton, Heidi Newfield and several other artist-celebrities; this production served to raise funds for diabetes research. Concurrently, the Wayne Newton Research Grant awarded by the American Diabetes Association was created. It has been awarded to several researchers including Jose F. Caro and Peter J. Roach.

In 2001, Newton succeeded Bob Hope as chairman of the United Service Organizations Celebrity Circle, a nonprofit-charitable corporation that provides live entertainment to members of the United States Armed Forces and their families. Newton was the grand marshal of the 80th Annual Shenandoah Apple Blossom Festival in Winchester, Virginia from May 1–7, 2007. He canceled a sold-out show to join the Festival. In 2008, Newton received a Woodrow Wilson Award for Public Service. The Woodrow Wilson International Center for Scholars, a national memorial to President Wilson, commemorates "the ideals and concerns of Woodrow Wilson." The award honors leaders who have given back to their communities.

=== Finances and legal problems ===
From 1980 to 1982, Newton was part owner of the Aladdin Hotel, in a partnership that led to a number of lawsuits and a failed attempt by Newton to purchase the entire hotel in 1983.

In 1992, Newton filed for Chapter 11 bankruptcy to reorganize an estimated $20 million in debts, much of which was accumulated while suing NBC for libel; he claimed the network had reported that he partnered with the Mafia to buy the Aladdin. His bankruptcy declaration included a $341,000 Internal Revenue Service tax lien. By 1999, he was financially well off again.

In August 2005, the IRS filed a lawsuit against Newton alleging that he and his wife owed more than $1.8 million in taxes and penalties. One of Newton's tax lawyers disputed that, saying, "We believe the IRS owes him money."

In late 2009, officials at Oakland County International Airport in Waterford, Michigan, claimed Newton owed the airport more than $60,000 for unpaid parking fees, which they claimed he owed after having abandoned a $2 million Fokker F28 plane there more than three years before. The plane was originally flown in for renovations in 2005. After they were completed in 2007, the plane was moved to an outside parking area. The monthly parking fees were $5,000. An aircraft of this type needs to have its engines run at least once a month to retain its airworthiness. The plane has since been disassembled, transported, and reassembled on his estate grounds.

In February 2010, Bruton Smith sued Newton, claiming he was delinquent on a loan he had personally guaranteed, then bought from Bank of America. Smith sought foreclosure of Newton's Las Vegas ranch Casa de Shenandoah. That same month, Clark County sheriff's deputies were refused entry to Newton's ranch. The officers attempted to serve civil papers and seize property as part of a $501,388 judgment against Newton awarded to Monty Ward, his former personal pilot, but security personnel employed by Newton refused to accept the papers. Ward, who filed suit in 2006, won the judgment for past-due wages in January 2009.

Newton was enmeshed in another lawsuit over a stalled project to convert his 40-acre home into a museum. In this lawsuit, a developer claimed he purchased Newton's home and paid the singer $19.5 million, with the understanding that Newton would move out and allow the property to be converted into a museum. The developer claimed that he had invested $50 million on the project, but that Newton had failed to move out and had deliberately thwarted construction efforts.

In December 2012, U.S. Bankruptcy Court Judge Bruce Markell approved the sale of Wayne Newton's estate, Casa de Shenandoah, to be listed for sale by Nathan and Associates, a Las Vegas brokerage firm. Bankruptcy papers placed the value of the property at $50.8 million. The property remained on the market, until 2015, when Newton reached an accord with Lacy Harber, the businessman who owned 70% of the corporation that had purchased Casa de Shenandoah to turn it into a museum. Newton and his family moved back into the property, and in September 2015, after construction of a museum to house memorabilia, it was opened for public tours. On April 26, 2018, the property hosted its last public event before closing indefinitely for renovations.

== Discography ==
=== Albums ===
Year	Album	Peak positions		Label
Year	Album	US 200	US CB	Label
1963	Danke Schoen	55	25	Capitol
1964	Sings Hit Songs	—	—	Capitol
1964	In Person!	—	—	Capitol
1965	Red Roses for a Blue Lady	17	21	Capitol
1965	Summer Wind	114	72	Capitol
1966	Now!	80	59	Capitol
1966	The Old Rugged Cross	—	—	Capitol
1966	Songs for a Merry Christmas	—	—	Capitol
1967	It's Only the Good Times	131	—	Capitol
1967	Song of the Year – Wayne Newton Style	—	—	Capitol
1967	Best of Wayne Newton	194	—	Capitol
1967	Michelle	—	—	Capitol
1968	Wow!: Live Hollywood Concert	—	—	Capitol
1968	God Is Alive	—	—	Capitol
1968	The Greatest!	—	—	Capitol
1968	Somewhere My Love	—	—	Capitol
1968	Best of Wayne Newton, Vol. 2	—	—	Capitol
1968	"Dreams of the Everyday Housewife" and "Town & Country"	—	—	MGM
1968	One More Time	—	—	MGM
1968	Walking on New Grass	—	—	MGM
1968	Wayne Newton's Songs of Faith	—	—	MGM
1968	Christmas Isn't Christmas Without You	—	—	MGM
1969	Live at the Frontier, Las Vegas	—	—	MGM
1969	Everything's in Love Today	—	—	MGM
1970	Wayne Newton	—	—	MGM
1970	The Long and Winding Road	—	—	Capitol
1970	Merry Christmas to You	—	—	Capitol
1971	How I Got This Way	—	—	Capitol
1972	Daddy Don't You Walk So Fast	34	17	Chelsea
1972	Can't You Hear the Song?	164	135	Chelsea
1972	Only Believe	—	—	Word
1973	While We're Still Young	—	—	Chelsea
1973	Pour Me a Little More Wine	—	—	Chelsea
1973	Just a Closer Walk	—	—	Word
1974	Everybody Knows	—	—	RCA Camden
1974	The Best of Wayne Newton Live	—	—	Chelsea
1975	The Midnight Idol	—	—	Chelsea
1976	Tomorrow	—	—	Chelsea
1976	Christmas Everywhere	—	—	Chelsea
1978	Change of Heart	—	—	20th Century Fox
1978	Wayne Newton Live!	—	—	Musicor
1979	She Believes in Me	—	—	Aries II
1979	Night Eagle I	—	—	Aries II
1979	Wayne Newton Christmas	—	—	Aries II
1984	A Merry Little Christmas	—	—	Capitol
1989	Coming Home	—	—	Curb
1989	Collector Series	—	—	Capitol
1990	The Best of Wayne Newton Now	—	—	Curb
1990	Merry Christmas from Wayne Newton	—	—	Curb
1992	Moods & Moments	—	—	Curb
1994	Best of Wayne Newton	—	—	EMI Australia
1999	Wild, Cool & Swingin': Wayne Newton	—	—	Capitol
1999	Sings the Hits of the '70s	—	—	Varese Sarabande
1999	36 All Time Greatest Hits	—	—	GSC Music
2003	Danke Schoen/Red Roses for a Blue Lady	—	—	Collectables
2004	Wayne Newton featuring Newton Brothers	—	—	Bear Family
2004	In Person + 3	—	—	DRG
2005	Mr. Las Vegas	—	—	Capitol
2007	Wayne Newton: Dynasty Collection	—	—	Aries II

=== Singles ===
Year	Single	Chart positions					
Year	Single	US Hot 100	US Cashbox	US AC	US Country	CAN RPM	CAN AC
1963	"Heart! (I Hear You Beating)" (with the Newton Brothers)	82	64	—	—	—	—
1963	"Danke Schoen" (with the Newton Brothers)	13	12	3	—	—	—
1963	"Shirl Girl" (with the Newton Brothers)	58	74	18	—	—	—
1964	"I'm Looking Over a Four Leaf Clover"	123	—	—	—	—	—
1964	"The Little White Cloud That Cried"	99	—	—	—	—	—
1964	"Only You"	122	119	—	—	—	—
1965	"Coming On Too Strong"	65	114	—	—	—	—
1965	"Red Roses for a Blue Lady"	23	18	4	—	—	3
1965	"(I'll Be with You) In Apple Blossom Time"	52	76	17	—	—	—
1965	"Summer Wind"	78	86	9	—	16	6
1965	"Remember When (We Made These Memories)"	69	87	15	—	—	—
1965	"Some Sunday Morning"	123	96	23	—	—	15
1966	"After the Laughter"	—	123	—	—	—	—
1966	"Laura Lee"	—	144	—	—	—	—
1966	"Stagecoach to Cheyenne"	113	148	23	—	60	—
1966	"Games That Lovers Play"	86	97	22	—	—	—
1967	"Sunny Day Girl"	—	—	23	—	—	—
1967	"If I Only Had a Song to Sing"	—	132	—	—	—	—
1967	"Summer Colors"	—	—	20	—	—	—
1967	"Through the Eyes of Love"	—	—	26	—	—	—
1967	"Love of the Common People"	106	—	33	—	—	—
1968	"All the Time"	—	134	26	—	—	—
1968	"Remembering"	—	128	—	—	—	—
1968	"Dreams of the Everyday Housewife"	60	58	14	—	28	—
1968	"Husbands and Wives"	—	97	28	—	—	—
1969	"(I Guess) The Lord Must Be in New York City"	—	—	28	—	—	—
1972	"Daddy Don't You Walk So Fast" (gold record)	4	1	3	55	1	1
1972	"Can't You Hear the Song?"	48	38	3	—	32	8
1972	"Anthem"	65	45	—	—	53	—
1973	"Pour Me a Little More Wine"	—	107	26	—	—	—
1973	"While We're Still Young"	107	—	—	—	—	—
1974	"Help Me Help You"	—	—	—	—	—	67
1974	"Lady Lay"	101	83	47	—	—	37
1976	"The Hungry Years"	82	81	11	—	—	—
1979	"You Stepped into My Life"	90	91	—	—	—	—
1979	"I Apologize"	—	—	45	—	—	—
1980	"Years"	35	32	40	—	—	—
1989	"While the Feeling's Good" (with Tammy Wynette)	—	—	—	63	—	—
1991	"I Know So"	—	—	—	—	—	—
1992	"The Letter"	—	1	—	—	—	—
"—" denotes a recording that did not chart or was not released in that territory.

== Filmography ==
=== Film ===
- 80 Steps to Jonah (1969) - Mark Jonah Winters
- Rocky III - Himself (uncredited)
- Ferris Bueller's Day Off (1986) - Voice, archival
- Licence to Kill (1989) - Professor Joe Butcher
- The Adventures of Ford Fairlane (1990) - Julian Grendel
- The Dark Backward (1991) - Jackie Chrome
- Best of the Best 2 (1993) - Weldon
- Night of the Running Man (1995) - August Gurino
- Vegas Vacation (1997) - Wayne Newton
- Elvis Meets Nixon (1997) - Himself
- Ocean's Eleven (2001) - Boxing Spectator (cameo)
- Who's Your Daddy? (2004) - Peter Mack
- Elvis Has Left the Building (2004) - Himself (cameo, uncredited)
- Smokin' Aces (2006) - Wayne Newton (cameo)
- The Hangover (2009) - Himself (cameo)
- Hoodwinked Too! Hood vs. Evil (2011) - Jimmy 10-Strings (voice)
- 40 West (2011) - Sankey (cameo)
- Getting Back to Zero (2013) - Bruce
- Sharknado: The 4th Awakens (2016) - Himself
- Puppy Love (2021) - Marshall

=== Television ===
- American Bandstand (June 20, 1964) - Sings "Only You"
- The Jack Benny Program (December 4, 1964) - Sings two songs and plays multiple instruments
- The Ed Sullivan Show (May 3, 1965) - Sings "Hello Dolly"
- The Ed Sullivan Show (October 10, 1965) Sings "Remember When"
- The Lucy Show (December 27, 1965) - Sings 4 songs in the half-hour episode: "Side by Side", "Bessie the Heifer", "You're Nobody till Somebody Loves You", and "Danke Schoen".
- Bonanza (1966) - Plays the character "Andy Walker" in two episodes of the TV series
- The Ed Sullivan Show (April 13, 1966) - Sings "April Showers"
- The Danny Kaye Show (December 22, 1966) - Guest stars on Danny's Christmas show
- Here's Lucy (Season 1, Episode 9, November 25, 1968) - "Lucy sells Craig to Wayne Newton"
- Here's Lucy (Season 2, Episode 22, February 16, 1970) - "Lucy and Wayne Newton"
- Vega$ ("The Classic Connection", 1979) - Appears as Justin Marsh, a race car driver mixed up in crime and friend of Dan Tanna
- Vega$ ("Dead Ringer", 1981) - Appears as himself and hires Dan Tanna after receiving threatening phone calls that accuse him of being an imposter
- Pimp My Ride ("Robert's Chevrolet Van", 1984) - Appears as himself on the MTV reality show
- North and South, Book II (1986) - Appears as CSA Capt. Thomas Turner
- Full House ("Viva Las Joey", 1990) - Appears as himself
- Roseanne ("Vegas, Vegas", 1991) - Appears as himself
- L.A. Law (1991) - Plays the role of the opposing counsel
- Perfect Strangers ("Wayne Man", 1992) - Appears as himself; plot of the episode is for Balki to get tickets to Newton's sold-out concert
- Tales from the Crypt ("The Pit", 1994) - Plays the role of fight promoter, Wink Barnum
- The Fresh Prince of Bel-Air ("Viva Lost Wages", 1995) - Plays the role of the manager of a Las Vegas casino
- Ally McBeal ("They Eat Horses, Don't They?", 1998)
- The Pretender ("Cold Dick", 2000) - Appears as himself
- My Wife and Kids ("Fantasy Camp", 2004) - Appears as himself
- 7th Heaven ("Wayne's World", 2004) - Appears as himself
- Kingdom Hospital ("On the Third Day", 2004) - Plays the role of maintenance man, Jack Handlemann
- According to Jim ("Vegas Baby", 2003) - Appears as himself
- Las Vegas ("Pros and Cons", 2003; "Meatball Montecito", 2006) - Appears as himself
- The Entertainer (2005) - Newton hosts the reality competition series hosted that aired on the E! network
- Dancing with the Stars (Season 5, 2007) - Appears as a contestant, performing with Cheryl Burke
- The Price Is Right (Season 36, 2007) - Makes a guest appearance and participates for a contestant to win a trip to Las Vegas
- Celebrity Family Feud (Season 1, 2008) - Appears as a contestant
- The Amazing Race ("Amazing Grace, How Sweet the Sound", 2009) - Appears as himself
- The Apprentice ("One of Us Will Win, But Not by Much", 2013)
- Who Wants to Be a Millionaire (Season 15, 2015; Season 16, 2018) - Appeared as a celebrity guest and raised $10,000 for charity, in his case the USO
- 46th Academy of Country Music Awards (2011) - Appeared as a member of Toby Keith's entourage as Keith performed the song Red Solo Cup
- The Bachelorette ("Week 5", 2018) - Guest appearance where he teaches Bachlorette contestants how to write a song and perform live in Las Vegas
- Always Late with Katie Nolan ("Advice for the Las Vegas Raiders", 2018) - Guest appearance where he speaks about the Las Vegas Raiders
- 2022 NFL draft (Day 2, 2022) - Announces the 90th overall selection for the Raiders
- Hacks ("There Will Be Blood", 2022) - Guest appearance
- Fallout: The Ghoul Log (TV special, 2025) - Serves as the voice of Mr. New Vegas, the DJ of Radio New Vegas
- American Dad! ("Donkey Shame", 2026) - Appears as himself

=== Video games ===
- Fallout: New Vegas (2010) - Serves as the voice of Mr. New Vegas, the DJ of Radio New Vegas, an in-game radio station

=== Bibliography ===
- Newton, Wayne (1989). Once Before I Go. With Dick Maurice. William Morrow and Company. ISBN 0-688-07973-3.
