= Cashbox (magazine) =

Music industry trade magazine

- Cover of the September 1971 issue featuring Led Zeppelin
- Categories: Music industry, trade magazine
- Frequency: Weekly
- First issue: July 1942; 84 years ago (original version); 2006 (revival)
- Final issue: November 16, 1996; 29 years ago (original version)
- Country: United States
- Based in: New York City
- ISSN: 0008-7289

Cashbox, also known as Cash Box, is an American music-industry trade magazine, originally published weekly from July 1942 to November 1996. Ten years after its dissolution, it was revived and continues as Cashbox Magazine, an online magazine with weekly charts and occasional special print issues. In addition to the music industry, the magazine covered the amusement arcade industry, including jukebox machines and arcade games.

== History ==
=== Print edition charts (1942–1996) ===
Cashbox was one of several magazines that published record charts in the United States. Its most prominent competitors were Billboard and Record World (known as Music Vendor prior to April 18, 1964). Unlike Billboard, Cashbox combined all currently available recordings of a song into one chart position with artist and label information shown for each version, alphabetized by label. Originally, no indication of which version was the biggest seller was given, but from October 25, 1952, a star was placed next to the names of the most important artists. Cashbox also printed shorter jukebox charts that included specific artist data beginning in spring 1950. Separate charts were presented for jukebox popularity, record sales, and radio airplay. This process was similar to Billboard's methodology prior to August 1958, when Billboard debuted its "Hot 100", which attempted to combine all measures of popularity into one all-encompassing chart. In addition, Cashbox published chart data for specific genres, such as country music and rhythm and blues (R&B) music. In 1960, Cashbox discontinued its R&B chart after the March 5 issue; it was reinstated in the December 17 issue due to popular demand. The chart was originally dropped because it became dominated by pop records.

Cashbox was a competitor to Billboard through the 1950s and 1960s, but two factors spelled its decline in the 1970s. Archivist and record historian Joel Whitburn published his first research book based on the Billboard Hot 100, which made those data the "Bible" for official historic chart positions. In addition, the syndicated radio series American Top 40 with Casey Kasem used Billboard chart statistics, cementing Billboard as the dominant chart data for current and historic reference. Magazine publisher George Albert compiled Cashbox chart data for a reference book more than a decade later, and Dick Clark used Cashbox information for a time on his National Music Survey, beginning in 1981, but by that time, the trend was set.

Perhaps the final straw for Cashbox came on December 12, 1992, when the Top 100 chart reported the number-one song as "The Letter" by Wayne Newton. The song failed to reach any Billboard chart, and local radio charts or sales reports did not place it in the top 10. This called the magazine's integrity into question. Cashbox lost considerable credibility within the industry after this, with accusations of chart fixing. No official findings of the Newton incident were ever revealed. Cashbox subsequently printed its final consecutive chart of this era in November 1996.

In 2003, the former Cashbox Magazine became involved in a murder trial after police in Nashville, Tennessee, made an arrest in a 1989 cold case. Kevin Hughes was a small-town boy from southeastern Illinois, who spent his childhood focused on music and creating his own country music charts. As a young man of 22, Hughes thought he had landed his dream job in Nashville as the chart director for Cashbox's country music chart for up-and-coming artists. He compiled data from jukebox plays, record sales, and radio play to determine the Cashbox chart positions of various country music records. He reportedly was looking to introduce more scientific and transparent methods of determining chart positions, when a year into his job, he was gunned down in the street late one night on Nashville's famous Music Row. After years of investigation, police arrested his former Cashbox coworker, Richard D'Antonio, for the murder. Prosecutors maintained the killing was in connection with a payola scheme where record promoter Chuck Dixon paid Cashbox employees for favorable chart positions and other publicity. A Dixon client was once named Cashbox's "Male Vocalist of the Year" without having sold a single record. Hughes was reportedly killed for not going along with the chart-fixing scheme. D'Antonio, a Cashbox employee associated with Dixon, was convicted of first-degree murder in 2003 and died in prison in 2014. Dixon had already died a few years prior to D'Antonio's arrest.

The Top 10 of the Cash Box singles and albums charts were also published in British magazine Melody Maker in the 1980s.

=== Revived magazine (2006–present) ===
Cash Box was reinvented as the monthly online Cashbox Magazine in 2006, with the consent and cooperation of the family of Albert, the late president and publisher of the original edition. Cashbox has bimonthly print editions available by mail subscription.

As of April 2015, Cashbox Magazine has added the following music charts: Roots Music, Bluegrass Singles, Bluegrass Gospel Singles, Beach Music Top 40, Roadhouse Blues and Boogie Top 40, Country Christian Top 100 Singles, and Southern Gospel Singles. The online magazine also relaunched the Looking Ahead Charts on March 1, 2015, covering all genres of music. The Cashbox Top 100 has been expanded to the Top 200. All chart data for the main Cashbox charts are provided by Digital Radio Tracker.

Sandy Graham is the owner, editor-in-chief, and CEO of Cashbox Canada, an independent music trade publication in Toronto, Canada. Shane and Robert Bartosh control the Roots data. Bruce Elrod is the owner and remains the registered agent for Cashbox, which is now operated from Ridgeway, South Carolina.

The current owners of Cashbox met with Wilds & Associates co-founder and CEO Randall Wilds in 2018 to discuss business relations. Wilds acquired an interest in Cashbox Magazine, leading to the formation of a partnership. As a result, Wilds & Associates became the publisher for Cashbox. While the digital/online edition remains intact, Cashbox returned to a printed edition as a bimonthly publication beginning with their November/December 2018 issue, featuring country music artist Blake Shelton on the cover. In addition to being the publisher for Cashbox, Wilds & Associates also serves as the distributor of the publication. Since returning to a print edition, a new website was unveiled in late 2021. The new site offers readers a preview of each issue, music news, and subscription information.

=== Archives ===
In 2014, Whitburn's Record Research Inc. published a history of the Cash Box singles chart data covering October 1952 through the 1996 demise of the original magazine. Randy Price maintains the original Cash Box data for the online archives.

The Swem Library at the College of William and Mary maintains the archive of the original print editions of Cash Box magazine. The print editions were digitized in collaboration with the Internet Archive, via a grant from the Council on Library and Information Resources.

== Charts described ==
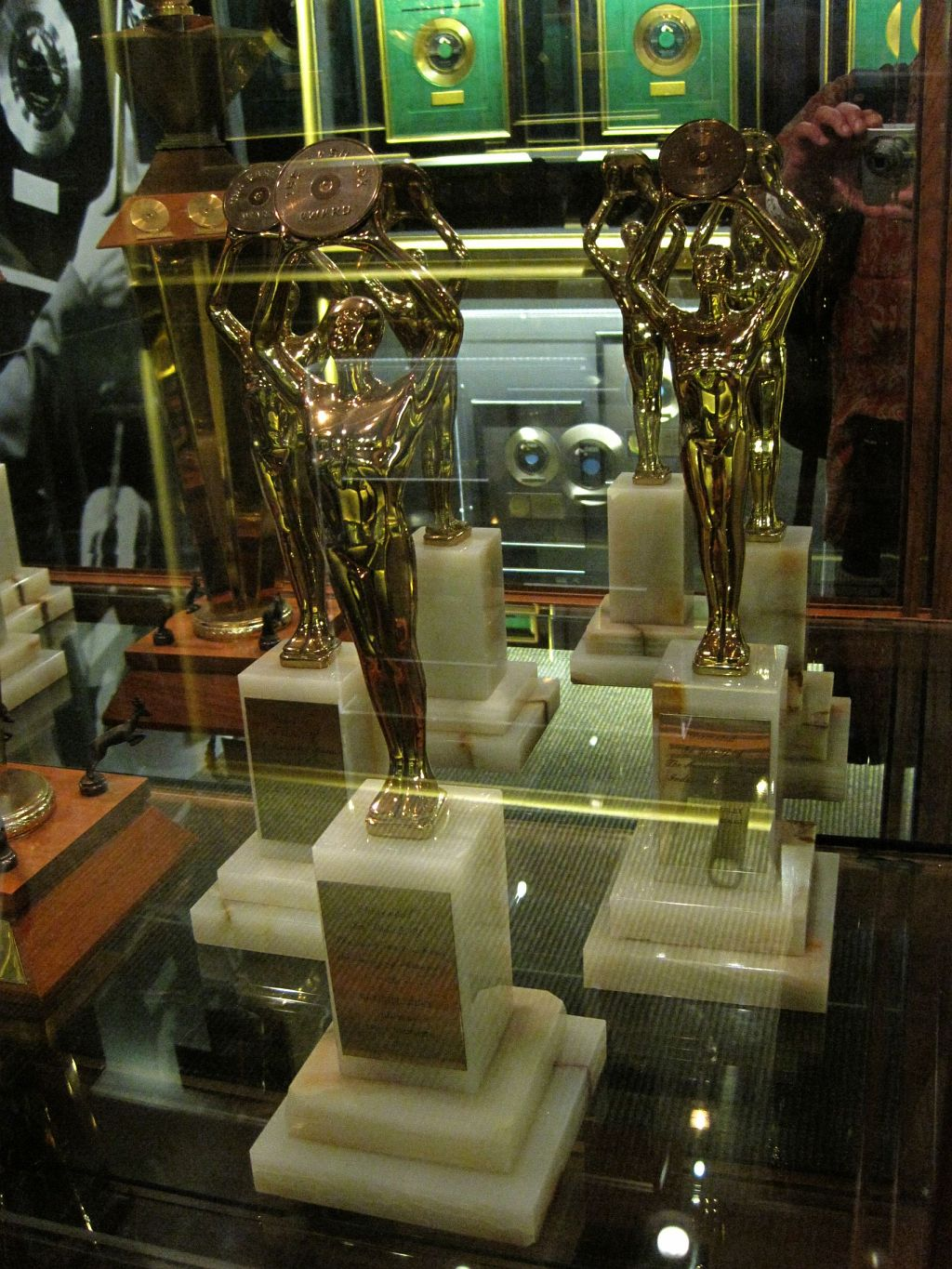
Cash Box also presented awards recognizing the top-selling artists on its charts.

=== Looking Ahead chart ===
The Looking Ahead chart was the Cash Box equivalent to the Bubbling Under charts of Billboard. It commenced on October 3, 1959, with 20 positions. By April 29, 1961, the magazine had 50 positions and maintained that format during the 1960s. It was in the 20–30 position format during the 1970s until February 27, 1982, when it was discontinued. It recommenced on August 4, 1990, with 15 positions until its final cessation on March 27, 1993.

=== Top 100 Country Singles chart ===
This was a chart that was based on what Cash Box called a "quantitative analysis" of playlist reports. The magazine's March 14, 1981, issue revealed the use of 102 country radio stations nationwide. The magazine would receive reports from the stations. It was not based only on radio station reports. Sales data were used, as well. These could come from retailers, rack jobbers, and one-stops.

== Bibliography ==
- Hoffmann, Frank (1983). The Cash Box Singles Chart, 1950-1981. Metuchen, New Jersey: The Scarecrow Press. ISBN 0810815958.
- Hoffmann, Frank; Albert, George (1988). The Cash Box Album Charts, 1955-1974. Metuchen, New Jersey: Scarecrow Press. ISBN 0810820056.

== See also ==
- Category:Cashbox number-one singles
