= Danke Schoen =

Single by Wayne Newton

from the album Danke Schoen
- B-side: "Better Now Than Later"
- Released: June 17, 1963
- Recorded: May 6, 1963
- Genre: Traditional Pop, swing
- Length: 2:35
- Label: Capitol
- Songwriters: Bert Kaempfert, Kurt Schwabach, Milt Gabler
- Producers: T.M. Music, Inc.

Wayne Newton singles chronology
"Heart! (I Hear You Beating)" (1963)	"Danke Schoen" (1963)	"Shirl Girl" (1963)

"Danke Schoen" (/ˈdɑːŋkə ʃeɪn/ DAHNG-kə shayn, German: [ˈdaŋkə ʃøːn]) is a song of German origin, whose title translates to English as "Thank you very much". Bert Kaempfert, who composed the melody, recorded it as an instrumental, in 1959 and later in 1962, under the title "Candlelight Cafe". Kurt Schwabach wrote the German lyrics. The song gained international fame in 1963 when singer Wayne Newton recorded an American version, with English lyrics by Milt Gabler.

== Newton's version ==
Wayne Newton's first version was released when he was 21 years old. The song was originally intended for singer Bobby Darin as a follow-up to his hit single "18 Yellow Roses" in the spring of 1963, but after seeing Newton perform at the Copacabana, Darin decided to give the song to Newton and transposed the key of the recording to fit Newton's voice.

The song was featured in the 1986 American comedy film Ferris Bueller's Day Off, lip-synced by the main character, Ferris Bueller (Matthew Broderick). It has also been featured in many television commercials and motion pictures, such as Meet the Parents, Matchstick Men, Vegas Vacation, Fools Rush In as well as the French-American comedy Crime Spree. In 2015 it was used in a television commercial for Bank of America, and in 2017 in a trailer for the video game Wolfenstein II: The New Colossus. In 2016 the song was used in a series of commercials for Australian insurer AAMI. The Newton version peaked at number 13 on Billboard's pop chart, and number 3 on its easy listening chart.

In the song, Newton pronounces the words as "dunke shane", rather than "danke schön", and it has been postulated that this is a regional accent variation that may have been prevalent in communities of German immigrants to the USA.

=== Personnel ===
According to the AFM contract sheet, the following musicians appeared at the recording session.

- Jimmie Haskell - session leader, arrangements
- Leon Russell
- Jimmy Bond
- Hal Blaine
- Carol Kaye
- Glen Campbell
- Tommy Tedesco
- Louis Blackburn
- Kenneth Shroyer
- Roy Caton
- Virgil Evans
- Donald “Ritchie” Frost
- Emil Richards
- Tibor Zelig
- Jerome Reisler
- Harold Dicterow
- William Kurasch
