= Ortho Mattress =

American mattress and bedding company

- Company type: Private company
- Founded: 1957; 69 years ago
- Headquarters: La Mirada, California
- Number of locations: 70 (2012)
- Area served: Southern California
- Owner: High Street Holdings
- Number of employees: 240 (2011)
- Website: orthomattress.com

Ortho Mattress is an American mattress and bedding company with retail and manufacturing headquarters in La Mirada, California. Ortho Mattress has more than 70 stores throughout the Southern California region.

The mattress maker employs approximately 240 people. Brands like Avant, Cool Quilt, Entice, Doctor Preferred, Doctor Preferred Reserve and The Club Collection are all manufactured under the Ortho Mattress, Inc. brand. They also carry top name mattress brands like Tempur-Pedic, Stearns and Foster, and Aireloom.

== History ==
Ortho Mattress was founded in 1957 in Gardena, California. In 1991, Ortho Mattress filed for Chapter 11 bankruptcy protection with plans to close 40 locations. In 1996, Ortho merged with W. Simmons Industries and was renamed W.E. Bedding in 1997. In 1998, High Street Holdings, owned by the Karmin family, acquired Ortho Mattress.

In 2002, the mattress company reopened their own factory in Cerritos, California where they began making their own mattress components in-house. The name WE Bedding was officially named Ortho Mattress by 2004. In 2007, it moved all manufacturing of its products back to Southern California from China and the following year moved its headquarters to La Mirada, California.

In 2012, Ortho Mattress was named "Best Mattress Store" in the Valley/Ventura area of Los Angeles by Los Angeles Times readers in its inaugural Readers’ Choice.

In June 2026, Ortho Mattress filed for Chapter 11 bankruptcy again, reporting over $14.1 million in debt, as well as assets between $1 million and $10 million and liabilities between $10 million and $50 million.
